= Tampa, Kansas =

City in Marion County, Kansas

- City
- Location within Marion County and Kansas

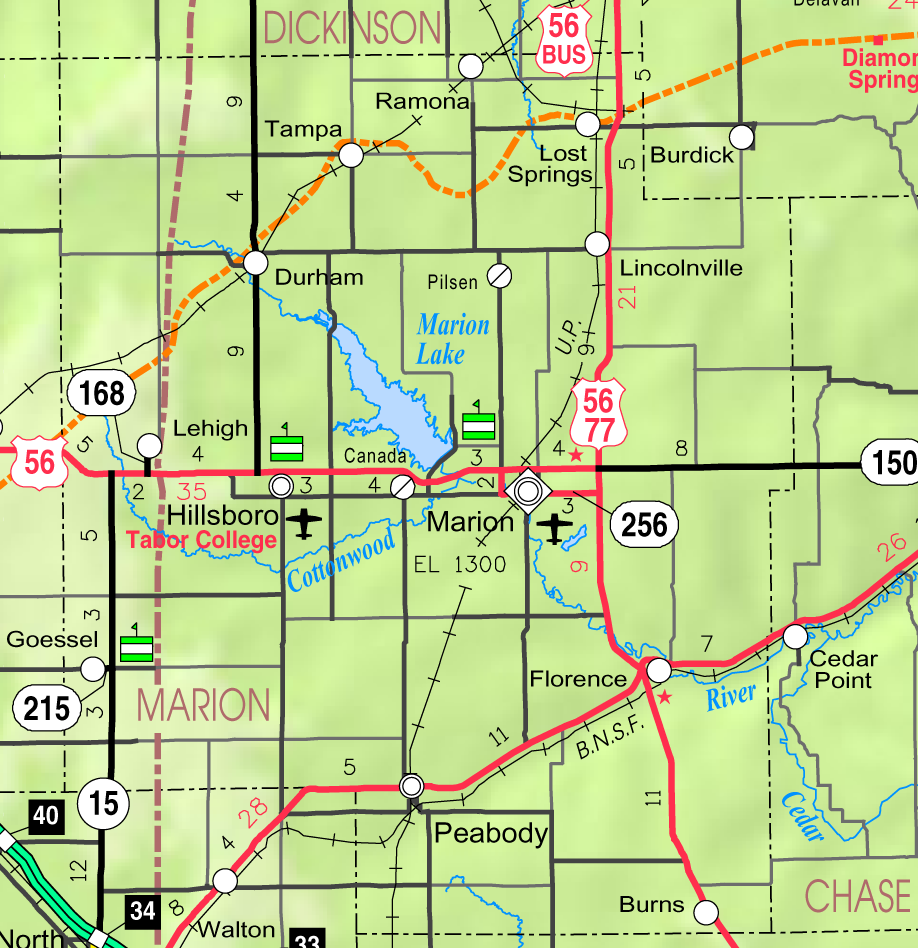
- KDOT map of Marion County (legend)
- Coordinates: 38°32′53″N 97°09′15″W
- Country: United States
- State: Kansas
- County: Marion
- Township: Blaine
- Platted: 1887
- Incorporated: 1908

Government
  - Type: Mayor–Council
  - Mayor: Timothy Svoboda

Area
  - Total: 0.18 sq mi (0.46 km^{2})
  - Land: 0.18 sq mi (0.46 km^{2})
  - Water: 0 sq mi (0.00 km^{2})
- Elevation: 1,427 ft (435 m)

Population (2020)
  - Total: 105
  - Density: 590/sq mi (230/km^{2})
- Time zone: UTC-6 (CST)
  - Summer (DST): UTC-5 (CDT)
- ZIP Code: 67483
- Area code: 785
- FIPS code: 20-70000
- GNIS ID: 2396029

Tampa is a city in Marion County, Kansas, United States. As of the 2020 census the population of the city was 105. It is located between Durham and Ramona and is next to a railroad.

== History ==
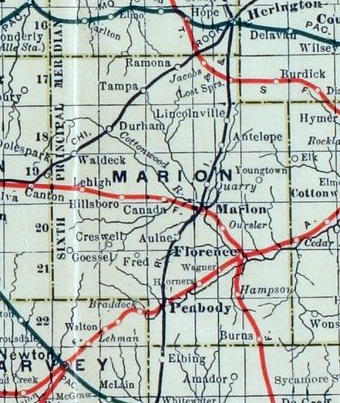
1915 railroad map of Marion County

=== Early history ===
For many millennia, the Great Plains of North America was inhabited by nomadic Native Americans. From the 16th century to 18th century, the Kingdom of France claimed ownership of large parts of North America. In 1762, after the French and Indian War, France secretly ceded New France to Spain, per the Treaty of Fontainebleau.

=== 19th century ===
In 1802, Spain returned most of the land to France. In 1803, most of the land for modern day Kansas was acquired by the United States from France as part of the 828,000 square mile Louisiana Purchase for 2.83 cents per acre.

From the 1820s to the 1870s, one of the most significant land routes in the United States was the Santa Fe Trail. It was located along the edge of what would become Tampa. Two Santa Fe Trail markers were located on the trail near Tampa. The trail was active across Marion County from 1821 to 1866.

In 1854, the Kansas Territory was organized, then in 1861 Kansas became the 34th U.S. state. In 1855, Marion County was established within the Kansas Territory, which included the land for modern day Tampa.

In 1887, the Chicago, Kansas and Nebraska Railway built a main line from Herington through Tampa to Pratt. In 1888, this line was extended to Liberal. Later it was extended to Tucumcari, New Mexico and El Paso, Texas. It foreclosed in 1891 and was taken over by Chicago, Rock Island and Pacific Railway, which shut down in 1980 and reorganized as Oklahoma, Kansas and Texas Railroad. The company merged in 1988 with Missouri Pacific Railroad, and merged again in 1997 with Union Pacific Railroad. Most locals still refer to this railroad as the "Rock Island".

The Golden Belt Town Company filed the plat for Tampa in 1887. The source of the city name is said to have been suggested by a railroad engineer who rode one of the first trains through Tampa. Tampa was incorporated as a city in 1908.

A post office was established in Tampa on April 17, 1888.

== Geography ==
Tampa is located in the scenic Flint Hills and Great Plains of the state of Kansas. According to the United States Census Bureau, the city has a total area of 0.18 square miles (0.47 km^{2}), all land.

== Demographics ==
Historical population
Census	Pop.	Note	%±
1910	256		—
1920	262		2.3%
1930	275		5.0%
1940	222		−19.3%
1950	216		−2.7%
1960	145		−32.9%
1970	154		6.2%
1980	113		−26.6%
1990	113		0.0%
2000	144		27.4%
2010	112		−22.2%
2020	105		−6.2%
U.S. Decennial Census

=== 2010 census ===
As of the census of 2010, there were 112 people, 48 households, and 27 families residing in the city. The population density was 622.2 inhabitants per square mile (240.2/km^{2}). There were 67 housing units at an average density of 372.2 per square mile (143.7/km^{2}). The racial makeup of the city was 98.2% White and 1.8% Native American. Hispanic or Latino of any race were 0.9% of the population.

There were 48 households, of which 22.9% had children under the age of 18 living with them, 50.0% were married couples living together, 6.3% had a female householder with no husband present, and 43.8% were non-families. 43.8% of all households were made up of individuals, and 23% had someone living alone who was 65 years of age or older. The average household size was 2.33 and the average family size was 3.19.

The median age in the city was 45 years. 28.6% of residents were under the age of 18; 5.4% were between the ages of 18 and 24; 16.1% were from 25 to 44; 23.2% were from 45 to 64; and 26.8% were 65 years of age or older. The gender makeup of the city was 58.9% male and 41.1% female.

=== 2000 census ===
As of the census of 2000, there were 144 people, 59 households, and 37 families residing in the city. The population density was 736.5 inhabitants per square mile (284.4/km^{2}). There were 69 housing units at an average density of 352.9 per square mile (136.3/km^{2}). The racial makeup of the city was 93.06% White, and 6.94% from two or more races. Hispanic or Latino of any race were 9.03% of the population.

There were 59 households, out of which 30.5% had children under the age of 18 living with them, 50.8% were married couples living together, 11.9% had a female householder with no husband present, and 35.6% were non-families. 33.9% of all households were made up of individuals, and 25.4% had someone living alone who was 65 years of age or older. The average household size was 2.44 and the average family size was 3.21.

In the city, the population was spread out, with 30.6% under the age of 18, 6.9% from 18 to 24, 21.5% from 25 to 44, 16.7% from 45 to 64, and 24.3% who were 65 years of age or older. The median age was 36 years. For every 100 females, there were 105.7 males. For every 100 females age 18 and over, there were 88.7 males.

As of 2000 the median income for a household in the city was $18,125, and the median income for a family was $42,083. Males had a median income of $25,000 versus $23,125 for females. The per capita income for the city was $12,677. There were 6.9% of families and 15.6% of the population living below the poverty line, including 25.7% of under eighteens and 11.1% of those over 64.

== Area attractions ==
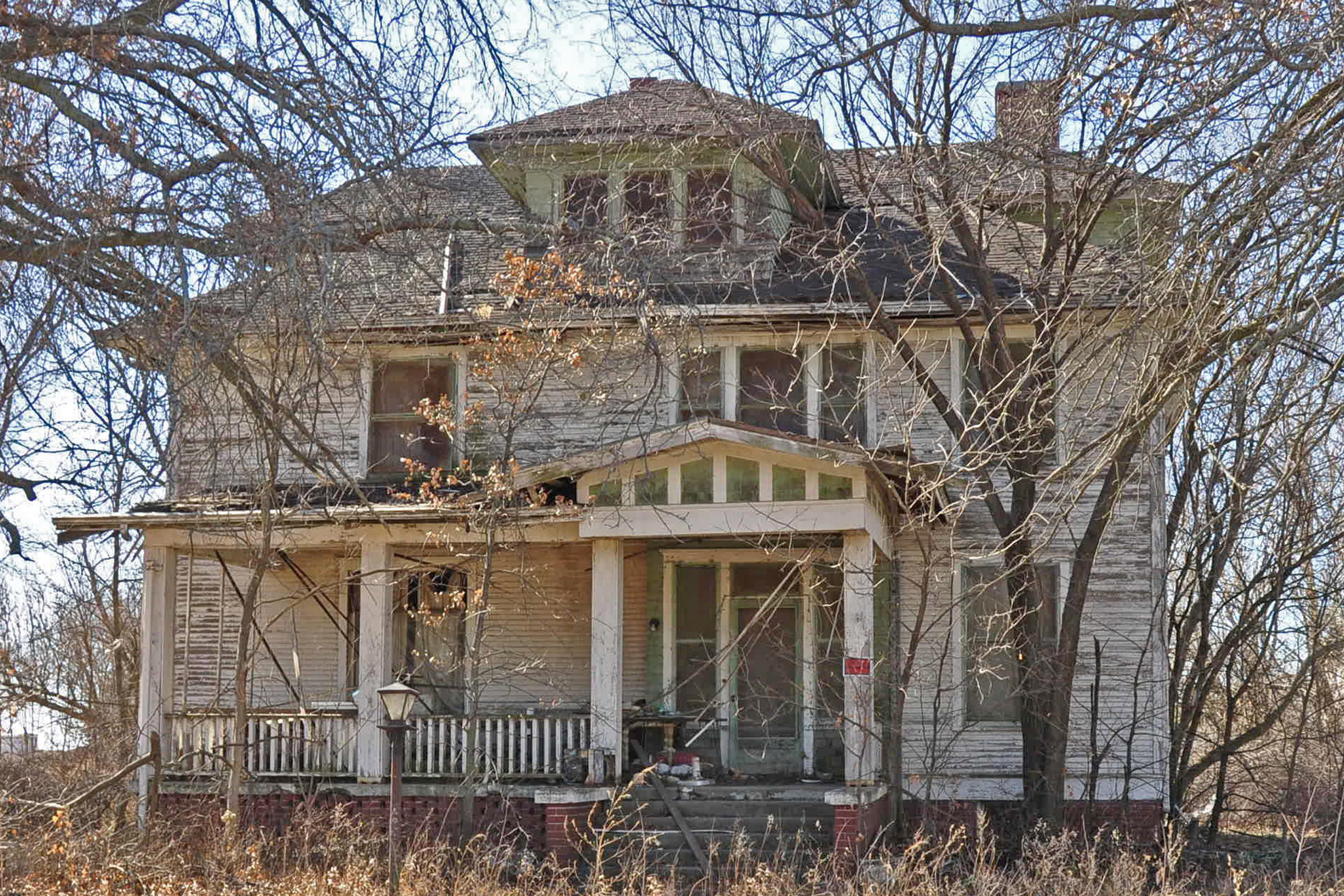
P. H. Meehan House in 2022

Tampa has one building listed on the National Register of Historic Places (NRHP), the 1910 P. H. Meehan House (NRHP) at 401 North Columbus Street. It is not open to public. Patrick Henry Meehan (March 12, 1868-February 4, 1944) served as president of Tampa State Bank. The house was demolished in June of 2025. "401 Columbus St. Tampa, KS" (Map). Google Maps.

Other historic sites include:

- Santa Fe Trail
  - Santa Fe Trail Markers, numerous markers in the area
  - Santa Fe Trail Self-Guided Auto Tour.

== Economy ==
Tampa is home to Tampa State Bank among other establishments.

== Government ==
The Tampa government consists of a mayor and five council members. The council meets the 1st Monday of each month at 7pm (winter) or 8pm (summer).

- City Hall, 113 W 3rd.
- Fire Department, 302 N Main St.

== Education ==
The community is served by Centre USD 397 public school district. The high school is a member of T.E.E.N., a shared video teaching network between five area high schools.

- Centre School; 2374 310th St, Lost Springs, KS; between Lost Springs and Lincolnville, east of the U.S. 77 highway

Tampa High School was closed through school unification. The Tampa High School mascot was Tampa Tigers.

== Media ==
=== Print ===
- The Herington Times, newspaper from Herington.
- Marion County Record, newspaper from Marion.
- Hillsboro Free Press, free newspaper for greater Marion County area.

== Infrastructure ==
=== Transportation ===
The K-15 highway passes 3.75 mi west of the city. Tampa is served by the Union Pacific Railroad, formerly the Southern Pacific, and formerly the Chicago, Rock Island and Pacific Railroad. Tampa is located on UP's Golden State main line to El Paso, Texas and still serves the Tampa Elevator during summer harvests.

=== Utilities ===
- Electricity: Rural is provided by Flint Hills RECA.
- Water: Rural is provided by Marion County RWD #1.

== See also ==
- National Register of Historic Places listings in Marion County, Kansas
- Historical Maps of Marion County, Kansas
- 1953 Flint–Worcester tornado outbreak sequence
