= Township 8, Morris County, Kansas =

Township in Morris County, Kansas, U.S.

Township 8
- Township
- Location within Morris County
- Coordinates: 38.565068°N 96.808864°W
- Country: United States
- State: Kansas
- County: Morris

Area
  - Total: 71.963 sq mi (186.38 km^{2})
  - Land: 71.677 sq mi (185.64 km^{2})
  - Water: 0.286 sq mi (0.74 km^{2}) 0.40%

Population (2020)
  - Total: 180
  - Density: 2.5/sq mi (0.97/km^{2})
- Time zone: UTC-6 (CST)
  - Summer (DST): UTC-5 (CDT)
- Area code: 785

Township 8 is a township in Morris County, Kansas, United States. As of the 2020 census, its population was 180.

== Geography ==
Township 8 covers an area of 71.963 square miles (186.38 square kilometers).

=== Communities ===
- Burdick

=== Adjacent townships ===
- Township 7, Morris County (north)
- Township 9, Morris County (east)
- Diamond Creek Township, Chase County (southeast)
- Clear Creek Township, Marion County (southwest)
- Lost Springs Township, Marion County (west)
- Lyon Township, Dickinson County (northwest)
