= Pilsen, Kansas =

Unincorporated community in Marion County, Kansas

- Unincorporated community and CDP
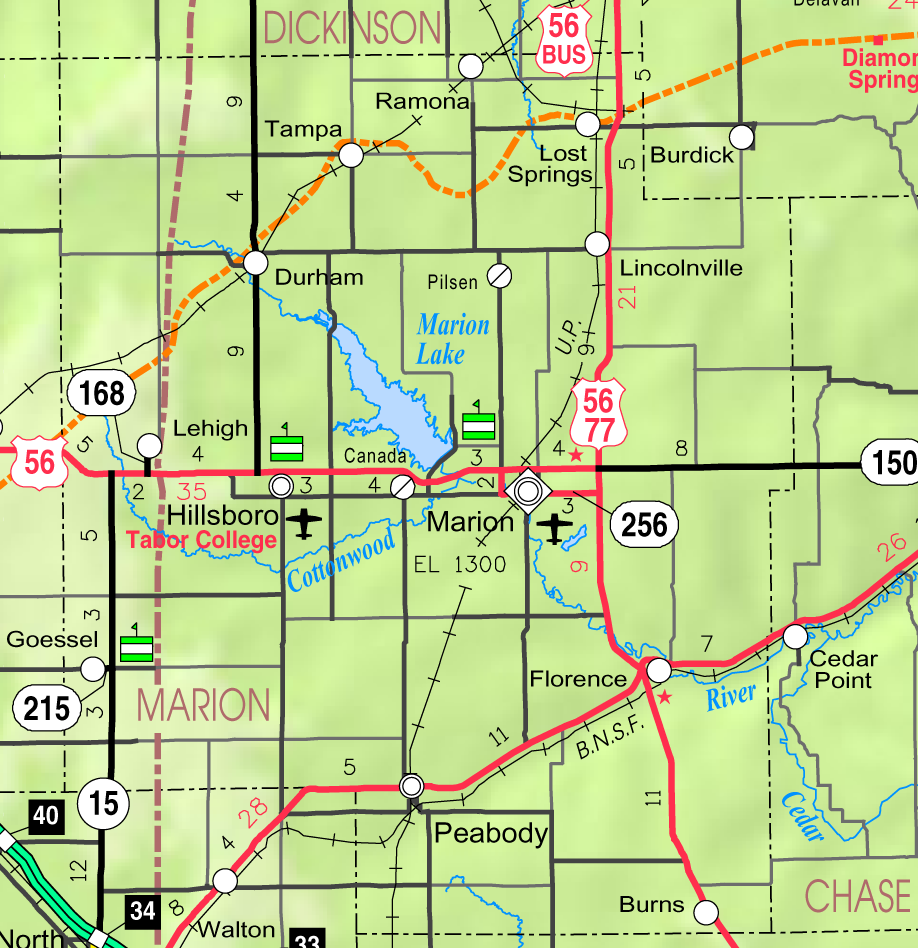
- KDOT map of Marion County (legend)

- Location within Kansas Location within the United States
- Coordinates: 38°28′17″N 97°02′25″W
- Country: United States
- State: Kansas
- County: Marion
- Township: Clark, Clear Creek
- Founded: 1874
- Named for: Plzeň
- Elevation: 1,434 ft (437 m)

Population (2020)
  - Total: 65
- Time zone: UTC-6 (CST)
  - Summer (DST): UTC-5 (CDT)
- ZIP Code: 66861
- Area code: 620
- FIPS code: 20-55875
- GNIS ID: 477246

Pilsen is an unincorporated community and census-designated place (CDP) in Marion County, Kansas, United States. As of the 2020 census, the population of the community and nearby areas was 65. The community is named after the city Plzeň (German: Pilsen) in Czech Republic, formerly Bohemia. It is located north of Marion and west of Lincolnville at the intersection of Remington Road and 275th Street.

== History ==
=== Early history ===
For many millennia, the Great Plains of North America was inhabited by nomadic Native Americans. From the 16th century to 18th century, the Kingdom of France claimed ownership of large parts of North America. In 1762, after the French and Indian War, France secretly ceded New France to Spain, per the Treaty of Fontainebleau.

=== 19th century ===
In 1802, Spain returned most of the land to France. In 1803, most of the land for modern day Kansas was acquired by the United States from France as part of the 828,000 square mile Louisiana Purchase for 2.83 cents per acre.

In 1854, the Kansas Territory was organized, then in 1861 Kansas became the 34th U.S. state. In 1855, Marion County was established within the Kansas Territory, which included the land for modern day Pilsen.

Pilsen was founded in 1874 and named to honor the city of Plzeň of Bohemia by Bohemian immigrants. The area was settled in the 1870s and 1880s by 46 Bohemian families of Czech and German descent who purchased their land from the Atchison, Topeka and Santa Fe Railway.

In 1888, the first Catholic church was built. It was a two-story frame building; the upper floor was the church and the lower floor was the rectory. The building was converted into a convent after the second church was built.

Up until about 1902, the community was centered around a General Store that was located approximately 1.5 miles (2.4 km) south of the current Pilsen site.

=== 20th century ===
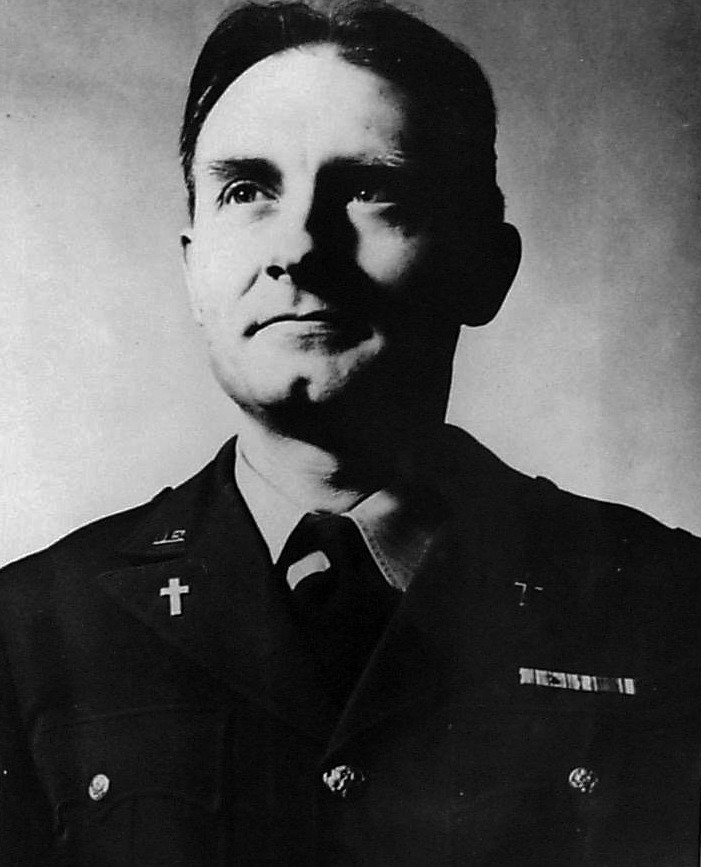
Captain Chaplain Emil Kapaun

After the General Store closed in 1902, Mr and Mrs Cerny built a new two-story store at the current Pilsen site, and continued to operate it until 1944, then later it was torn down in 1970.

The current St. John Nepomucene Catholic church as built in 1914–1915. Train carloads of brick were ordered from Kansas City then delivered to the closest station in Lincolnville. The pile of bricks in Pilsen was so large that people often joked "how many churches are you going to build?" The church cost approximately $30,000, but the cost would have been higher if it had not been for the local volunteer labor. In 1924, an eleven-room rectory was built. In the early 1940s, Emil Kapaun was pastor at the church and assisted Father Sklenar.

A post office existed in Pilsen from March 17, 1917 to March 8, 1957.

=== 21st century ===
On June 3, 2001, volunteers dedicated a statue honoring Chaplain Emil Kapaun at St. John Nepomucene Church.

In 2010, the Keystone-Cushing Pipeline (Phase II) was constructed near Pilsen, north to south through Marion County, with much controversy over road damage, tax exemption, and environmental concerns (if a leak ever occurs).

== Geography ==
Pilsen is located at coordinates 38.4714024, −97.0402972 in the scenic Flint Hills and Great Plains of the state of Kansas. It is approximately 7.5 miles (12.1 km) north of Marion.

== Demographics ==
Historical population
Census	Pop.	Note	%±
2020	65		—
U.S. Decennial Census

For statistical purposes, the United States Census Bureau has defined this community and nearby area as a census-designated place (CDP).

The 2020 United States census counted 65 people, 21 households, and 15 families in Pilsen. The population density was 46.4 per square mile (17.9/km^{2}). There were 34 housing units at an average density of 24.3 per square mile (9.4/km^{2}). The racial makeup was 92.31% (60) white or European American (92.31% non-Hispanic white), 0.0% (0) black or African-American, 1.54% (1) Native American or Alaska Native, 0.0% (0) Asian, 0.0% (0) Pacific Islander or Native Hawaiian, 3.08% (2) from other races, and 3.08% (2) from two or more races. Hispanic or Latino of any race was 4.62% (3) of the population.

Of the 21 households, 14.3% had children under the age of 18; 61.9% were married couples living together; 14.3% had a female householder with no spouse or partner present. 28.6% of households consisted of individuals and 9.5% had someone living alone who was 65 years of age or older. The average household size was 4.8 and the average family size was 4.8. The percent of those with a bachelor's degree or higher was estimated to be 7.7% of the population.

21.5% of the population was under the age of 18, 6.2% from 18 to 24, 23.1% from 25 to 44, 23.1% from 45 to 64, and 26.2% who were 65 years of age or older. The median age was 44.5 years. For every 100 females, there were 182.6 males. For every 100 females ages 18 and older, there were 240.0 males.

The 2016–2020 5-year American Community Survey estimates show that the median household income was $43,750 (with a margin of error of +/- $18,486) and the median family income was $43,750 (+/- $18,486). Females had a median income of $22,841 (+/- $1,830). The median income for those above 16 years old was $18,125 (+/- $11,369). Approximately, 12.5% of families and 13.0% of the population were below the poverty line, including 12.8% of those under the age of 18 and 0.0% of those ages 65 or over.

== Area events ==
- Father Kapaun Day on first Sunday in June
- Military Pilgrimage in November

== Area attractions ==
- St John Nepomucene Catholic Church. The highlight of the small community of Pilsen is St John Nepomucene Catholic Church. The cornerstone was laid in 1914 by Father John Sklenar, the first parish priest. The church can be seen for miles around the flat farming community of Pilsen. The church itself is 120 feet tall, topped by a silver-colored neo-Gothic dome. St John Nepomucene, for whom the church was named is the patron saint of Bohemia and Christian martyr of the 14th Century.
- Marion Reservoir, approximately 7 miles (11 km) southwest of Pilsen.

== Education ==
The community is served by Centre USD 397 public school district. The high school is a member of T.E.E.N., a shared video teaching network between five area high schools.

- Centre School; 2374 310th St, Lost Springs, KS; between Lost Springs and Lincolnville, east of U.S. 77 highway.

== Media ==
=== Print ===
- Marion County Record, official county newspaper and city newspaper for Marion.
- Hillsboro Free Press, free newspaper for greater Marion County area.

== Infrastructure ==
=== Transportation ===
U.S. Route 77 is 4.5 miles (7.2 km) east, and U.S. Route 56 is 7.5 miles (12.1 km) south of the community.

=== Utilities ===
- Internet
  - Satellite is provided by HughesNet, StarBand, WildBlue.
- TV
  - Satellite is provided by DirecTV, Dish Network.
  - Terrestrial is provided by regional digital TV stations.
- Electricity
  - Community and Rural areas provided by Flint Hills RECA.

== Notable people ==
- Emil Kapaun, (1916–1951), Roman Catholic priest, United States Army chaplain, candidate for sainthood and recipient of the Medal of Honor.
