= Overland Township, Kansas =

Township in Morris County, Kansas, U.S.

Overland Township
- Township
- Location within Morris County
- Coordinates: 38.822456°N 96.861309°W
- Country: United States
- State: Kansas
- County: Morris

Area
  - Total: 34.035 sq mi (88.15 km^{2})
  - Land: 33.927 sq mi (87.87 km^{2})
  - Water: 0.108 sq mi (0.28 km^{2}) 0.32%

Population (2020)
  - Total: 85
  - Density: 2.5/sq mi (0.97/km^{2})
- Time zone: UTC-6 (CST)
  - Summer (DST): UTC-5 (CDT)
- Area code: 785

Overland Township is a township in Morris County, Kansas, United States. As of the 2020 census, its population was 85.

== Geography ==
Overland Township covers an area of 34.035 square miles (88.15 square kilometers).

=== Adjacent townships ===
- Lyon Township, Geary County (north)
- Blakely Township, Geary County (northeast)
- Township 5, Morris County (east)
- Highland Township, Morris County (southeast)
- Township 6, Morris County (south)
- Union Township, Dickinson County (southwest)
- Liberty Township, Dickinson County (west)

=== Major highways ===
- US-77
- K-209
