= Antelope, Kansas =

Unincorporated community in Marion County, Kansas

- Unincorporated community
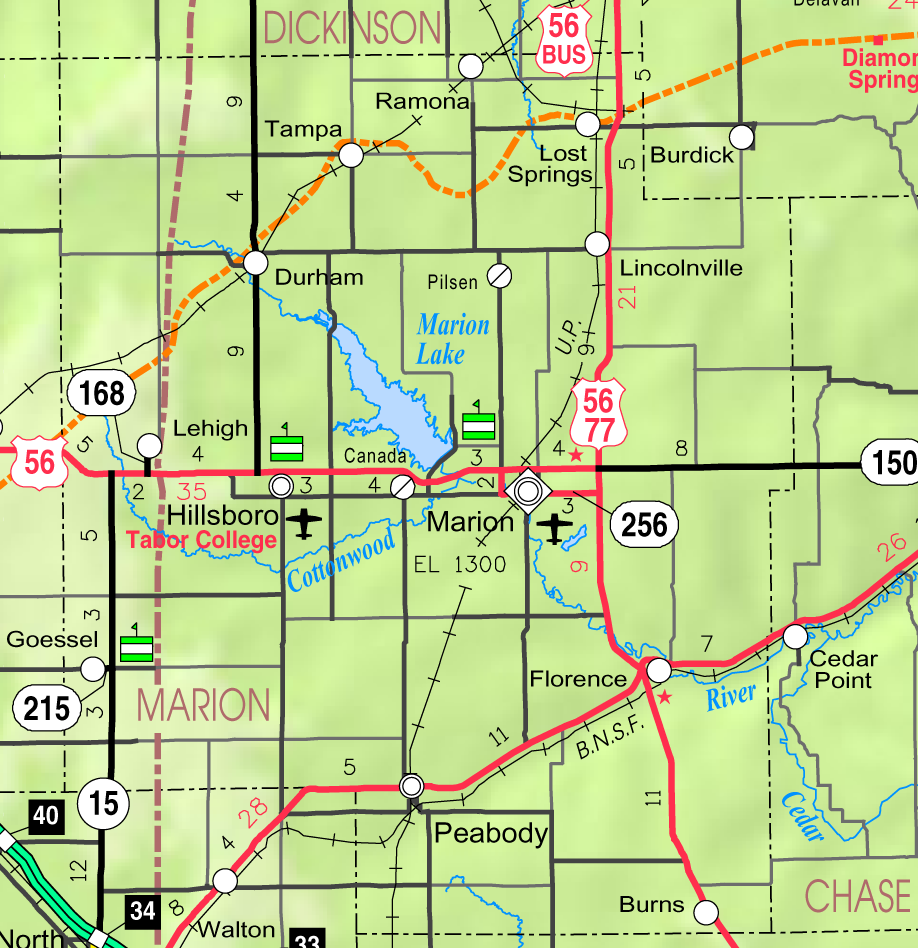
- KDOT map of Marion County (legend)

- Location within Kansas Location within the United States
- Coordinates: 38°26′10″N 96°58′26″W
- Country: United States
- State: Kansas
- County: Marion
- Township: Clear Creek
- Founded: 1870
- Named after: antelope
- Elevation: 1,368 ft (417 m)
- Time zone: UTC-6 (CST)
  - Summer (DST): UTC-5 (CDT)
- Area code: 620
- FIPS code: 20-01950
- GNIS ID: 477249

Antelope is an unincorporated community in Marion County, Kansas, United States. Antelope got its name from antelope grazing near where the first school was being built. It is located northeast of Marion, about 0.9 miles west of the intersection of U.S. Route 77 (aka U.S. Route 56) highway and 250th Street along the Union Pacific Railroad.

== History ==
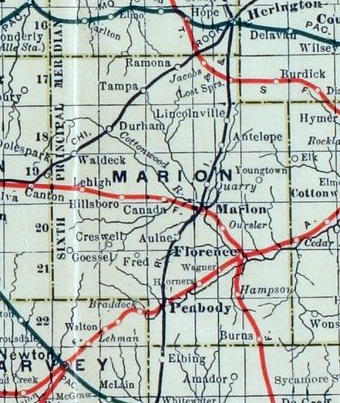
1915 railroad map of Marion County

=== Early history ===
For many millennia, the Great Plains of North America was inhabited by nomadic Native Americans. From the 16th century to 18th century, the Kingdom of France claimed ownership of large parts of North America. In 1762, after the French and Indian War, France secretly ceded New France to Spain, per the Treaty of Fontainebleau.

=== 19th century ===
In 1802, Spain returned most of the land to France. In 1803, most of the land for modern day Kansas was acquired by the United States from France as part of the 828,000 square mile Louisiana Purchase for 2.83 cents per acre.

In 1854, the Kansas Territory was organized, then in 1861 Kansas became the 34th U.S. state. In 1855, Marion County was established within the Kansas Territory, which included the land for modern day Antelope.

In 1887, the Chicago, Kansas and Nebraska Railway built a branch line north–south from Herington through Antelope to Caldwell. It foreclosed in 1891 and was taken over by Chicago, Rock Island and Pacific Railway, which shut down in 1980 and reorganized as Oklahoma, Kansas and Texas Railroad, merged in 1988 with Missouri Pacific Railroad, and finally merged in 1997 with Union Pacific Railroad. Most locals still refer to this railroad as the "Rock Island".

A post office existed in Antelope from July 25, 1870, to June 20, 1988.

== Geography ==
Antelope is located in the scenic Flint Hills and Great Plains of the state of Kansas. between Marion and Lincolnville next to the Union Pacific Railroad.

== Area attractions ==
Antelope has one listing on the National Register of Historic Places (NRHP).

- Amelia Park Bridge (NRHP), 1 mile north-east of Antelope on 260th Street.
- Island Field Ranch House (NRHP), 1 mile east of Antelope on U.S. Route 77. Childhood home of Alvin Silas Wight.

== Education ==
The community is served by Centre USD 397 public school district. The high school is a member of T.E.E.N., a shared video teaching network between five area high schools.

- Centre School; 2374 310th St, Lost Springs, KS; between Lost Springs and Lincolnville, east of U.S. 77 highway.

== Media ==
=== Print ===
- Marion County Record, newspaper from Marion.
- Hillsboro Free Press, free newspaper for greater Marion County area.

== Infrastructure ==
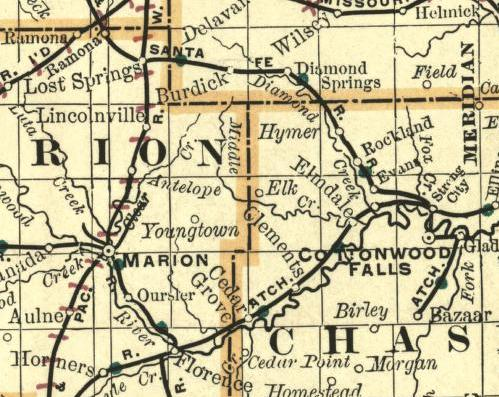
1893 railroad map

=== Transportation ===
U.S. Route 77 is 1 mile (1.6 km) east of Antelope. The Oklahoma Kansas Texas (OKT) line of the Union Pacific Railroad runs through the community.

The Chicago, Rock Island and Pacific Railroad formerly provided passenger rail service to Antelope on their mainline from Minneapolis to Houston until at least 1951. As of 2025, the nearest passenger rail station is located in Newton, where Amtrak's Southwest Chief stops once daily on a route from Chicago to Los Angeles.

=== Utilities ===
- Internet
  - Satellite is provided by HughesNet, StarBand, WildBlue.
- TV
  - Satellite is provided by DirecTV, Dish Network.
  - Terrestrial is provided by regional digital TV stations.
- Electricity
  - Community and Rural areas provided by Flint Hills RECA.

== Notable people ==
- Alvin Silas Wight, (1887–1949), Kansas House of Representatives, Educator, Farmer, his childhood home was the Island Field Ranch (NRHP), see above.

== See also ==
- National Register of Historic Places listings in Marion County, Kansas
