= Township 7, Morris County, Kansas =

Township in Morris County, Kansas, U.S.

Township 7
- Township
- Location within Morris County
- Coordinates: 38.647548°N 96.830785°W
- Country: United States
- State: Kansas
- County: Morris

Area
  - Total: 64.664 sq mi (167.48 km^{2})
  - Land: 64.487 sq mi (167.02 km^{2})
  - Water: 0.177 sq mi (0.46 km^{2}) 0.27%

Population (2020)
  - Total: 223
  - Density: 3.46/sq mi (1.34/km^{2})
- Time zone: UTC-6 (CST)
  - Summer (DST): UTC-5 (CDT)
- Area code: 785

Township 7 is a township in Morris County, Kansas, United States. As of the 2020 census, its population was 223.

== Geography ==
Township 7 covers an area of 64.664 square miles (167.48 square kilometers).

=== Communities ===
- Delavan

=== Adjacent townships ===
- Township 6, Morris County (north)
- Highland Township, Morris County (northeast)
- Township 9, Morris County (east)
- Township 8, Morris County (south)
- Lost Springs Township, Marion County (southwest)
- Lyon Township, Dickinson County (west)
- Union Township, Dickinson County (northwest)

=== Major highways ===
- US-56
- US-77
- K-4
- K-149
