= Caldwell Airport =

Caldwell Airport may refer to:

- Caldwell Industrial Airport, near Caldwell, Idaho, United States (FAA: EUL)
- Caldwell Municipal Airport (Kansas) in Caldwell, Kansas, United States (FAA: 01K)
- Caldwell Municipal Airport (Texas) in Caldwell, Texas, United States (FAA: RWV)
- Essex County Airport in Fairfield, New Jersey, United States; near Caldwell, NJ (FAA: CDW)
