= Township 5, Morris County, Kansas =

Township in Morris County, Kansas, U.S.

Township 5
- Township
- Location within Morris County
- Coordinates: 38.826948°N 96.75986°W
- Country: United States
- State: Kansas
- County: Morris

Area
  - Total: 35.94 sq mi (93.1 km^{2})
  - Land: 35.825 sq mi (92.79 km^{2})
  - Water: 0.115 sq mi (0.30 km^{2}) 0.32%

Population (2020)
  - Total: 581
  - Density: 16.2/sq mi (6.26/km^{2})
- Time zone: UTC-6 (CST)
  - Summer (DST): UTC-5 (CDT)
- Area code: 785

Township 5 is a township in Morris County, Kansas, United States. As of the 2020 census, its population was 581.

== Geography ==
Township 5 covers an area of 35.94 square miles (93.1 square kilometers).

=== Communities ===
- White City

=== Adjacent townships ===
- Blakely Township, Geary County (north)
- Liberty Township, Geary County (northeast)
- Township 4, Morris County (east)
- Highland Township, Morris County (south)
- Overland Township, Morris County (west)
- Lyon Township, Geary County (northwest)

=== Major highways ===
- K-4
