= Ramona, Kansas =

City in Marion County, Kansas

- City
- Location within Marion County and Kansas

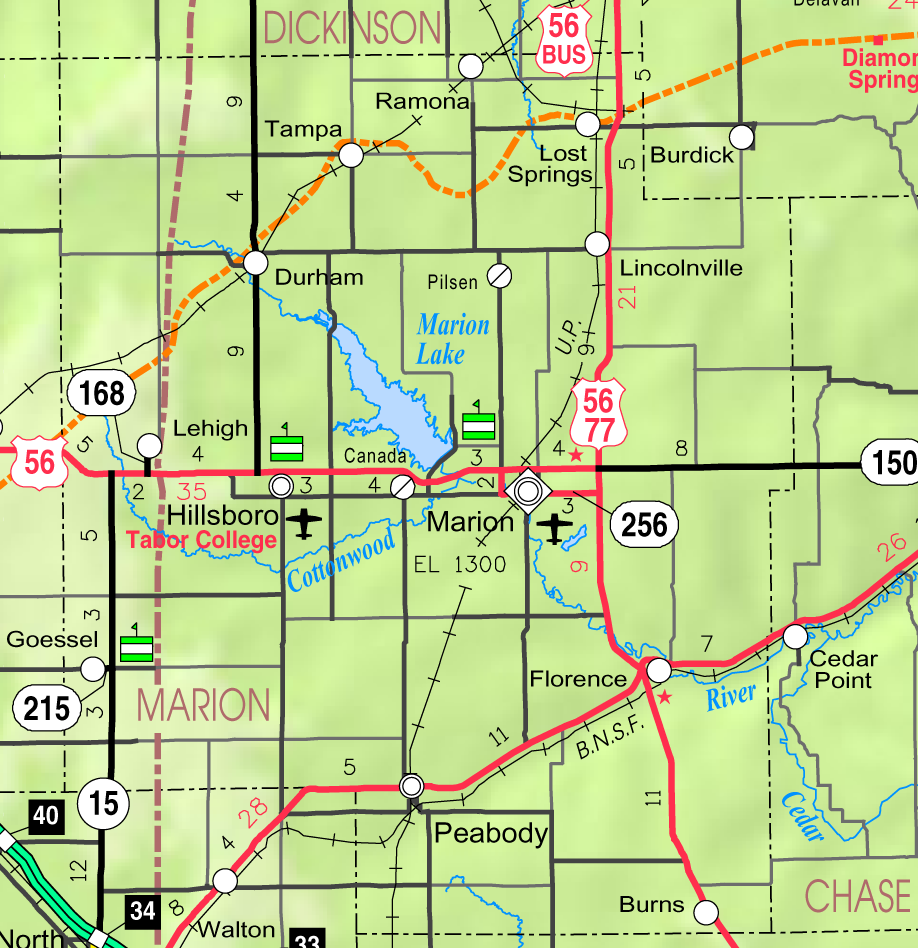
- KDOT map of Marion County (legend)
- Coordinates: 38°35′52″N 97°03′49″W
- Country: United States
- State: Kansas
- County: Marion
- Township: Colfax
- Platted: 1887
- Incorporated: 1909

Government
  - Type: Mayor–Council
  - Mayor: Byron Noeth

Area
  - Total: 0.29 sq mi (0.75 km^{2})
  - Land: 0.29 sq mi (0.75 km^{2})
  - Water: 0 sq mi (0.00 km^{2})
- Elevation: 1,421 ft (433 m)

Population (2020)
  - Total: 78
  - Density: 270/sq mi (100/km^{2})
- Time zone: UTC-6 (CST)
  - Summer (DST): UTC-5 (CDT)
- ZIP Code: 67475
- Area code: 785
- FIPS code: 20-58375
- GNIS ID: 2396310
- Website: ramonaks.com

Ramona is a city in Marion County, Kansas, United States. As of the 2020 census, the population of the city was 78. The city name is a Spanish name. It is located southwest of Herington next to a railroad.

== History ==
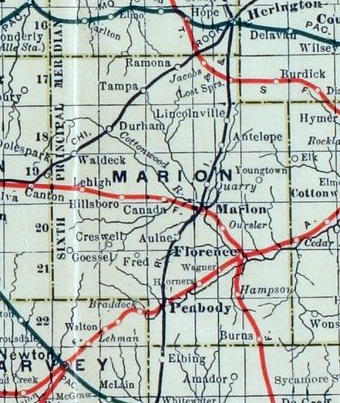
1915 railroad map of Marion County

=== Early history ===
For many millennia, the Great Plains of North America was inhabited by nomadic Native Americans. From the 16th century to 18th century, the Kingdom of France claimed ownership of large parts of North America. In 1762, after the French and Indian War, France secretly ceded New France to Spain, per the Treaty of Fontainebleau.

=== 19th century ===
In 1802, Spain returned most of the land to France. In 1803, most of the land for modern day Kansas was acquired by the United States from France as part of the 828,000 square mile Louisiana Purchase for 2.83 cents per acre.

In 1854, the Kansas Territory was organized, then in 1861 Kansas became the 34th U.S. state. In 1855, Marion County was established within the Kansas Territory, which included the land for modern day Ramona.

The city name Ramona is a Spanish name. Land ownership of the Ramona area dates back when the area belonged to Spain. Manuel De Lisa, a New Orleans merchant, petitioned his government for a large land grant in the Ramona area on July 16, 1799.

In 1887, the Chicago, Kansas and Nebraska Railway built a main line from Herington through Ramona to Pratt. In 1888, this line was extended to Liberal. Later, it was extended to Tucumcari, New Mexico and El Paso, Texas. It foreclosed in 1891 and taken over by Chicago, Rock Island and Pacific Railway, which shut down in 1980 and reorganized as Oklahoma, Kansas and Texas Railroad, merged in 1988 with Missouri Pacific Railroad, and finally merged in 1997 with Union Pacific Railroad. Most locals still refer to this railroad as the "Rock Island".

A post office was established in Ramona on August 9, 1887.

=== 21st century ===
In 2010, the Keystone-Cushing Pipeline (Phase II) was constructed near Ramona, north to south through Marion County, with much controversy over road damage, tax exemption, and environmental concerns (if a leak ever occurs).

== Geography ==
Ramona is located in the scenic Flint Hills and Great Plains of the state of Kansas.

According to the United States Census Bureau, the city has a total area of 0.31 square miles (0.80 km^{2}), all land. The county line lies 0.5 mile north of Ramona.

== Demographics ==
Historical population
Census	Pop.	Note	%±
1910	265		—
1920	303		14.3%
1930	240		−20.8%
1940	236		−1.7%
1950	190		−19.5%
1960	132		−30.5%
1970	121		−8.3%
1980	116		−4.1%
1990	106		−8.6%
2000	94		−11.3%
2010	187		98.9%
2020	78		−58.3%
U.S. Decennial Census

=== 2020 census ===
The 2020 United States census counted 78 people, 39 households, and 27 families in Ramona. The population density was 268.0 per square mile (103.5/km^{2}). There were 54 housing units at an average density of 185.6 per square mile (71.6/km^{2}). The racial makeup was 94.87% (74) white or European American (94.87% non-Hispanic white), 0.0% (0) black or African-American, 3.85% (3) Native American or Alaska Native, 0.0% (0) Asian, 0.0% (0) Pacific Islander or Native Hawaiian, 0.0% (0) from other races, and 1.28% (1) from two or more races. Hispanic or Latino of any race was 1.28% (1) of the population.

Of the 39 households, 43.6% had children under the age of 18; 33.3% were married couples living together; 17.9% had a female householder with no spouse or partner present. 20.5% of households consisted of individuals and 15.4% had someone living alone who was 65 years of age or older. The average household size was 2.4 and the average family size was 3.0. The percent of those with a bachelor's degree or higher was estimated to be 5.1% of the population.

21.8% of the population was under the age of 18, 3.8% from 18 to 24, 14.1% from 25 to 44, 46.2% from 45 to 64, and 14.1% who were 65 years of age or older. The median age was 51.0 years. For every 100 females, there were 85.7 males. For every 100 females ages 18 and older, there were 96.8 males.

The 2016–2020 5-year American Community Survey estimates show that the median household income was $41,750 (with a margin of error of +/- $15,924) and the median family income was $48,750 (+/- $11,319). Approximately, 27.3% of families and 39.8% of the population were below the poverty line, including 66.7% of those under the age of 18 and 6.7% of those ages 65 or over.

=== 2010 census ===
As of the census of 2010, there were 187 people, 66 households, and 45 families residing in the city. The population density was 603.2 inhabitants per square mile (232.9/km^{2}). There were 90 housing units at an average density of 290.3 per square mile (112.1/km^{2}). The racial makeup of the city was 93.0% White, 2.1% Native American, and 4.8% from two or more races. Hispanic or Latino of any race were 1.6% of the population.

There were 66 households, of which 36.4% had children under the age of 18 living with them, 47.0% were married couples living together, 9.1% had a female householder with no husband present, 12.1% had a male householder with no wife present, and 31.8% were non-families. 19.7% of all households were made up of individuals, and 7.5% had someone living alone who was 65 years of age or older. The average household size was 2.83 and the average family size was 3.36.

The median age in the city was 33.5 years. 35.3% of residents were under the age of 18; 2.2% were between the ages of 18 and 24; 21.9% were from 25 to 44; 27.8% were from 45 to 64; and 12.8% were 65 years of age or older. The gender makeup of the city was 54.5% male and 45.5% female.

== Government ==
The Ramona government consists of a mayor and five council members. The council meets the second and last Mondays of each month at 7PM.

- City Hall, 311 "D" Street.
- U.S. Post Office, 215 "D" Street.

== Education ==
The community is served by Centre USD 397 public school district. The high school is a member of T.E.E.N., a shared video teaching network between five area high schools.

- Centre School; 2374 310th St, Lost Springs, KS; between Lost Springs and Lincolnville, east of U.S. 77 highway.

== Media ==
=== Print ===
- The Herington Times, newspaper from Herington.
- Marion County Record, newspaper from Marion.
- Hillsboro Free Press, free newspaper for greater Marion County area.

== Infrastructure ==
=== Transportation ===
Ramona is served by the Union Pacific Railroad, formerly the Southern Pacific, and prior, the Chicago, Rock Island and Pacific Railroad. Ramona is located on UP's Golden State main line to El Paso, Texas, and has a rail siding for train meets before entering UP's Herington, Kansas Yard. The line was originally built by the Chicago, Kansas and Nebraska Railroad.

=== Utilities ===
- Internet
  - Fiber Optics is provided by TCT.
  - Satellite is provided by HughesNet, StarBand, WildBlue.
- TV
  - Fiber Optics is provided by TCT.
  - Satellite is provided by DirecTV, Dish Network.
  - Terrestrial is provided by regional digital TV stations.
- Telephone
  - Fiber Optics is provided by TCT.
- Electricity
  - City is provided by Westar Energy.
  - Rural is provided by Flint Hills RECA.
- Natural Gas is provided by Atmos Energy.
- Water
  - City is provided by Marion County RWD #1, billed by City of Ramona.
  - Rural is provided by Marion County RWD #1.
- Sewer
  - Service is provided by City of Ramona.
- Trash
  - Service is provided by M&K Trash.

== See also ==
- Historical Maps of Marion County, Kansas
- Centre High School
