= Township 6, Morris County, Kansas =

Township in Morris County, Kansas, U.S.

Township 6
- Township
- Location within Morris County
- Coordinates: 38.734026°N 96.863802°W
- Country: United States
- State: Kansas
- County: Morris

Area
  - Total: 30.225 sq mi (78.28 km^{2})
  - Land: 30.177 sq mi (78.16 km^{2})
  - Water: 0.048 sq mi (0.12 km^{2}) 0.16%

Population (2020)
  - Total: 114
  - Density: 3.78/sq mi (1.46/km^{2})
- Time zone: UTC-6 (CST)
  - Summer (DST): UTC-5 (CDT)
- Area code: 785

Township 6 is a township in Morris County, Kansas, United States. As of the 2020 census, its population was 114.

== Geography ==
Township 6 covers an area of 30.225 square miles (78.28 square kilometers).

=== Communities ===
- Latimer

=== Adjacent townships ===
- Overland Township, Morris County (north)
- Highland Township, Morris County (east)
- Township 7, Morris County (south)
- Lyon Township, Dickinson County (southwest)
- Union Township, Dickinson County (west)

=== Major highways ===
- US-77
- K-4
