= Buresh =

Buresh is a family name of Central European origin:

- Ivan Buresh (1885-1980), Bulgarian zoologist and entomologist, also known as Ivan Buresch (Bulgarian: Иван Буреш)
- Mike Buresh, chief meteorologist on Action News at WJAX-TV/WFOX-TV in Jacksonville, Florida.

== Places ==
- Buresh Archeological Site, in Kansas
- Buresh Farm, in Iowa, listed on the National Register of Historic Places.

== See also ==
- Bureš, the original Czech and Slovak family name
- Buresch (the German form of the name)
  - a reference to Bulgarian zoologist Ivan Buresh or Buresch (in zoological nomenclature taxonomy)
  - Karl Buresch (1878–1936), Austrian politician and Chancellor.
