= Centre High School =

Location
- 2374 - 310th Street; Lost Springs, Kansas 66859; United States; 38.523251°N 96.952038°W

Information
- School type: Public, High School
- Established: 1958
- School board: Board Website
- School district: Centre USD 397
- CEEB code: 171835
- Principal: Trevor Siebert
- Grades: PK-12
- Gender: coed
- Enrollment: 196 (2023-2024)
- Campus type: rural
- Colors: Red; Blue; White
- Athletics: Class 8-Man II, District 3
- Athletics conference: Wheat State
- Mascot: Cougar
- Communities served: Lost Springs, Lincolnville, Pilsen, Tampa, Ramona, Antelope, Burdick
- Website: School District

Centre High School is a rural public secondary school located 5 miles south of Lost Springs and 2 miles north of Lincolnville along U.S. Highway 77 in Marion County, Kansas. It is operated by Centre USD 397 school district. It is the sole public high school for the communities of Lincolnville, Lost Springs, Pilsen, Tampa, Ramona, Antelope, Burdick, and nearby rural areas of Marion / Morris / Dickinson / Chase Counties.

== History ==
Centre High School was established in 1958 as the result of the consolidation of several smaller high schools. High schools from Lincolnville, Lost Springs, Pilsen, Burdick, Tampa and Ramona consolidated into Centre Rural High School.

== Campus ==
The front of the building houses the administration offices. Other notable details include:

- A gymnasium on the southern side of the main building and another gym on the east side.
- A football field is located on the north Side.
- To the west is the Centre Middle School that houses grades 5 and 6.
- A machine shop and wood shop are detached and located on the east side.

== Academics ==
The high school is a member of T.E.E.N., a shared video teaching network, started in 1993, between five area high schools.

== Extracurricular activities ==
The mascot of Centre High is the Cougar.

Sports Offered Include:

- Football
- Volleyball
- Basketball
- Track
- Golf
- Baseball

Organizations Offered Include:

- FFA
- FBLA
- Honors Society
- NHS
- Student Council

== See also ==
- List of high schools in Kansas
- List of unified school districts in Kansas
