= Burdick, Kansas =

Unincorporated community in Morris County, Kansas

- Unincorporated community and CDP
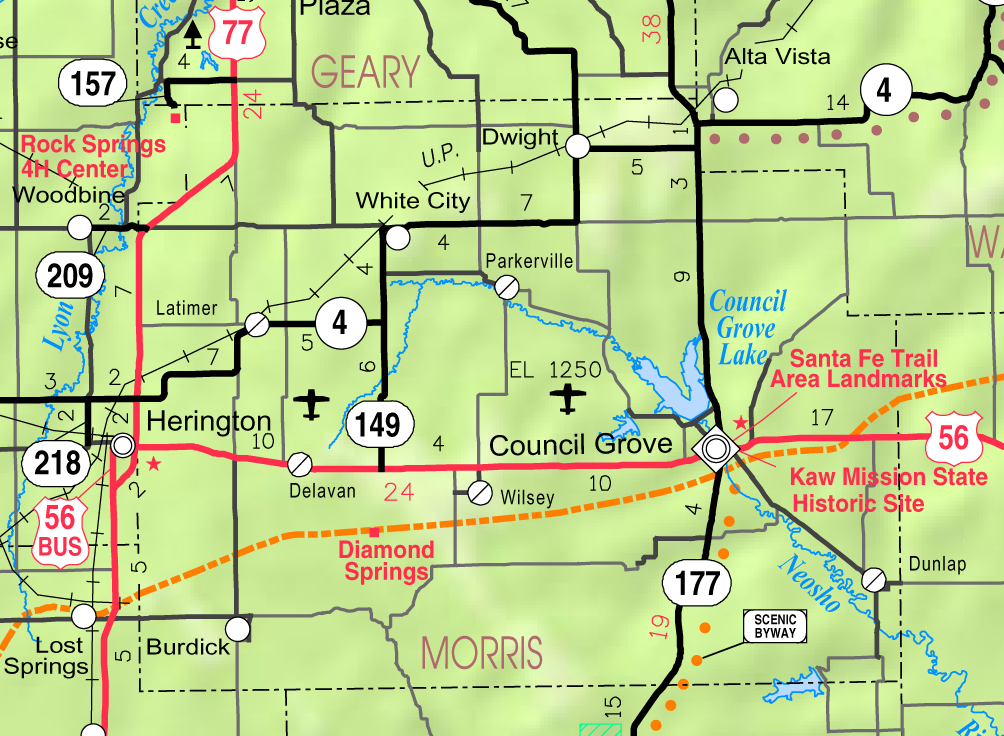
- KDOT map of Morris County (legend)

- Location within Kansas Location within the United States
- Coordinates: 38°33′49″N 96°50′44″W
- Country: United States
- State: Kansas
- County: Morris
- Founded: 1880s
- Named for: Ms Burdick
- Elevation: 1,453 ft (443 m)

Population (2020)
  - Total: 62
- Time zone: UTC-6 (CST)
  - Summer (DST): UTC-5 (CDT)
- ZIP Code: 66838
- Area code: 785
- FIPS code: 20-09300
- GNIS ID: 477148

Burdick is an unincorporated community and census-designated place (CDP) in Morris County, Kansas, United States. As of the 2020 census, the population was 62. It is located southeast of Herington, approximately 5.6 miles (9.0 km) east of the intersection of U.S. Route 77 (aka U.S. Route 56) highway and 340th Street, or about 6.5 miles (10.5 km) east of Lost Springs.

== History ==
=== Early history ===
For many millennia, the Great Plains of North America was inhabited by nomadic Native Americans. From the 16th century to 18th century, the Kingdom of France claimed ownership of large parts of North America. In 1762, after the French and Indian War, France secretly ceded New France to Spain, per the Treaty of Fontainebleau.

=== 19th century ===
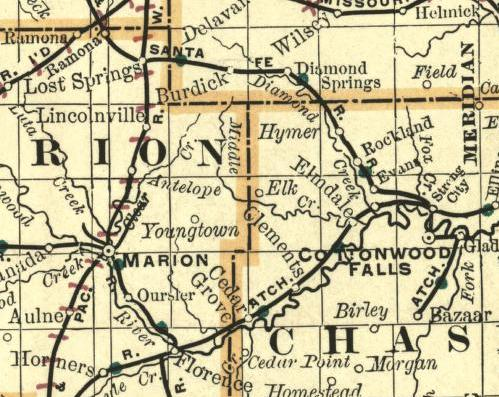
1893 railroad map

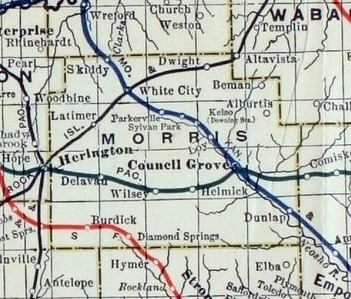
1915 railroad map of Morris County

In 1802, Spain returned most of the land to France. In 1803, most of the land for modern day Kansas was acquired by the United States from France as part of the 828,000 square mile Louisiana Purchase for 2.83 cents per acre.

From the 1820s to the 1870s, one of the most significant land routes in the United States was the Santa Fe Trail. It was located approximately 3 miles (4.8 km) north of Burdick. A large stone stage station, named "Six Mile Stage Station" was built at this location as a rest stop. In 1863, Charles Atkinson witnessed a raid on this station conducted by approximately 600 Cheyenne Indians. DAR Marker #29 was dedicated on October 9, 1908, at this location.

In 1854, the Kansas Territory was organized, then in 1861 Kansas became the 34th U.S. state. In 1859, Morris County was established within the Kansas Territory, which included the land for modern day Burdick.

In 1880, a Swedish settlement called Linsdale was created, consisting of Swedish immigrants from Henry and Mercer counties of Illinois. In 1887, the community name was changed to Burdick, in honor of Miss Burdick, the sweetheart of a Santa Fe Railroad official.

In 1887, Atchison, Topeka and Santa Fe Railway built a branch line from Neva (3 miles west of Strong City) to Superior, Nebraska. This branch line connects Strong City, Neva, Rockland, Diamond Springs, Burdick, Lost Springs, Jacobs, Hope, Navarre, Enterprise, Abilene, Talmage, Manchester, Longford, Oak Hill, Miltonvale, Aurora, Huscher, Concordia, Kackley, Courtland, Webber, Superior. In 2006, the line from Neva to Lost Springs was pulled but the right of way has not been abandoned. This branch line was originally called "Strong City and Superior line" but later the name was shortened to the "Strong City line". In 1996, the Atchison, Topeka and Santa Fe Railway merged with Burlington Northern Railroad and renamed to the current BNSF Railway. Most locals still refer to this railroad as the "Santa Fe".

A post office was established in Burdick on August 29, 1887.

== Geography ==
Burdick is located at 38°33′49″N 96°50′44″W (38.5636222, -96.8455682) at an elevation of 1,453 feet (443 m). It is approximately 6 miles (9.7 km) east of Lost Springs.

=== Climate ===
The climate in this area is characterized by hot, humid summers and generally mild to cool winters. According to the Köppen Climate Classification system, Burdick has a humid subtropical climate, abbreviated "Cfa" on climate maps.

== Demographics ==
Historical population
Census	Pop.	Note	%±
2020	62		—
U.S. Decennial Census

The 2020 United States census counted 62 people, 27 households, and 21 families in Burdick. The population density was 61.6 per square mile (23.8/km^{2}). There were 37 housing units at an average density of 36.8 per square mile (14.2/km^{2}). The racial makeup was 90.32% (56) white or European American (88.71% non-Hispanic white), 0.0% (0) black or African-American, 0.0% (0) Native American or Alaska Native, 0.0% (0) Asian, 0.0% (0) Pacific Islander or Native Hawaiian, 0.0% (0) from other races, and 9.68% (6) from two or more races. Hispanic or Latino of any race was 3.23% (2) of the population.

Of the 27 households, 25.9% had children under the age of 18; 77.8% were married couples living together; 22.2% had a female householder with no spouse or partner present. 18.5% of households consisted of individuals and 14.8% had someone living alone who was 65 years of age or older. The average household size was 1.8 and the average family size was 1.8. The percent of those with a bachelor's degree or higher was estimated to be 4.8% of the population.

19.4% of the population was under the age of 18, 1.6% from 18 to 24, 16.1% from 25 to 44, 25.8% from 45 to 64, and 37.1% who were 65 years of age or older. The median age was 57.0 years. For every 100 females, there were 121.4 males. For every 100 females ages 18 and older, there were 127.3 males.

The 2016–2020 5-year American Community Survey estimates show that the median household income was $23,919 (with a margin of error of +/- $326) and the median family income was $23,929 (+/- $364). The median income for those above 16 years old was $5,882 (+/- $2,285).

== Economy ==
Although Burdick is unincorporated, it has a post office with the ZIP Code of 66838.

== Area events ==
- Annual Burdick Labor Day Weekend Festival

== Education ==
The community is served by Centre USD 397 public school district. The high school is a member of T.E.E.N., a shared video teaching network between five area high schools.

- Centre School; 2374 310th St, Lost Springs, KS; between Lost Springs and Lincolnville, east of U.S. 77 highway.

History

In the 1910s, Burdick and Diamond Springs formed a high school district. In 1921, Diamond Valley High School was completed. The first class graduated in 1923 with three students. Due to decreasing attendance, the high school closed its doors in 1957.

== Films ==
- Bill's Run: A Political Journey in Rural Kansas, a 2004 feature documentary about William Kassebaum running for State Congress, which includes video of the local area.

== Media ==
=== Print ===
- The Herington Times, newspaper from Herington.
- Hillsboro Free Press, free newspaper for greater Marion County area.
- The Salina Journal, regional newspaper from Salina.

== Infrastructure ==
=== Transportation ===
U.S. Route 77 is 5.0 miles (8.0 km) west, and U.S. Route 56 is 6.5 miles (10.5 km) north of the community.

== Notable people ==
- Nancy Kassebaum (1932–2026), United States Senator from 1978 to 1997, lives on a ranch near Burdick.
- William Kassebaum (1962), lawyer, rancher, former member of the Kansas House of Representatives, son of Nancy Kassebaum.

== See also ==
- National Register of Historic Places listings in Morris County, Kansas
- Santa Fe Trail
