= Bures =

The following places are called Bures:

- Bures, Orne, a commune of France in the department of Orne
- Bures, Meurthe-et-Moselle, a commune of France in the department of Meurthe-et-Moselle
- Bures-en-Bray, a commune of France in the department of Seine-Maritime
- Bures-les-Monts, a commune of France in the department of Calvados
- Bures-sur-Yvette, a commune of France in the department of Essonne
- Bures, England, a village that straddles the county border between Suffolk and Essex
  - Bures Hamlet, the portion of the village in Essex
  - Bures St. Mary, the portion of the village in Suffolk
- Bures, Saskatchewan, a hamlet in Saskatchewan, Canada

== See also ==
- Bureš, a Czech surname
- Mount Bures, Essex, England
