= KRWV =

KRWV may refer to:

- Caldwell Municipal Airport (Texas) (ICAO code KRWV)
- KRWV-LP, a low-power radio station (99.3 FM) licensed to serve Gold Canyon, Arizona, United States
