= Township 4, Morris County, Kansas =

Township in Morris County, Kansas, U.S.

Township 4
- Township
- Location within Morris County
- Coordinates: 38.773556°N 96.658754°W
- Country: United States
- State: Kansas
- County: Morris

Area
  - Total: 59.784 sq mi (154.84 km^{2})
  - Land: 59.561 sq mi (154.26 km^{2})
  - Water: 0.223 sq mi (0.58 km^{2}) 0.37%

Population (2020)
  - Total: 204
  - Density: 3.43/sq mi (1.32/km^{2})
- Time zone: UTC-6 (CST)
  - Summer (DST): UTC-5 (CDT)
- Area code: 785

Township 4 is a township in Morris County, Kansas, United States. As of the 2020 census, its population was 204.

== Geography ==
Township 4 covers an area of 59.784 square miles (154.84 square kilometers). The Neosho River flows through it.

=== Communities ===
- Parkerville

=== Adjacent townships ===
- Liberty Township, Geary County (north)
- Township 3, Morris County (northeast)
- Township 2, Morris County (east)
- Township 9, Morris County (south)
- Highland Township, Morris County (southwest)
- Township 5, Morris County (west)
- Blakely Township, Geary County (northwest)

=== Major highways ===
- K-4
