= Centre USD 397 =

Public school district near Lost Springs, Kansas

Address
- 2382 310th St. Lost Springs, Kansas, 66859; United States
- Coordinates: 38.5235°N 96.9524°W

District information
- Type: Public
- Grades: K to 12
- Superintendent: Daniel Acklund
- Schools: 1

Other information
- Website: usd397.com

Centre USD 397 is a public unified school district headquartered in a rural area between Lost Springs and Lincolnville in Kansas. The district includes the communities of Lincolnville, Lost Springs, Pilsen, Tampa, Ramona, Antelope, Burdick, and nearby rural areas of Marion / Morris / Dickinson / Chase Counties.

== History ==
The number of students in rural communities dropped significantly across the 20th century. As farming technology progressed from animal power to small tractors towards large tractors over time, it allowed a farmer to support significantly more farm land. In turn, this led to fewer farm families, which led to fewer rural students. In combination with a loss of young men during foreign wars and rural flight, all of these caused an incremental population shrinkage of rural communities over time.

In 1945 (after World War II), the School Reorganization Act in Kansas caused the consolidation of thousands of rural school districts in Kansas.

In 1963, the School Unification Act in Kansas caused the further consolidatation of thousands of tiny school districts into hundreds of larger Unified School Districts.

In 1956, a school district was formed with the consolidation of the Lincolnville, Burdick, Lost Springs, and Ramona school districts. The Tampa school district was added later.

In 1965, the school district was approved by the state to become Unified School District (USD) 397.

=== Current schools ===
The school district operates the following school:

- Centre School in rural area between Lost Springs and Lincolnville. It is located east of 310th St and U.S. 77 highway.

=== Closed schools ===
- Centre Elementary School in Lost Springs at northeast corner of Crane and Berry. It was closed.
- Burdick High School in Burdick at north corner of Reed and Edwards. It was closed.
- Pilsen Elementary School in Pilsen at northwest corner of 275th Street and Robin Street. It was closed, and now the Pilsen Community Center.
- Ramona High School in Ramona at 607 D Street. It was closed, and now a business.
- Tampa High School in Tampa. It was closed, then demolished.

== See also ==
- Kansas State Department of Education
- Kansas State High School Activities Association
- List of high schools in Kansas
- List of unified school districts in Kansas
