= Clark Township, Kansas =

Clark Township Marion County, Kansas
- Township
- Location within Marion County

- Location within the state of Kansas
- Coordinates: 38.4785817°N 97.0957811°W
- Country: United States
- State: Kansas
- County: Marion

Area
  - Total: 36 sq mi (93 km^{2})

Dimensions
  - Length: 6.0 mi (9.7 km)
  - Width: 6.0 mi (9.7 km)
- Elevation: 1,394 ft (425 m)

Population (2020)
  - Total: 144
  - Density: 4.0/sq mi (1.5/km^{2})
- Time zone: UTC-6 (CST)
  - Summer (DST): UTC-5 (CDT)
- Area code: 620
- FIPS code: 20-13500
- GNIS ID: 477130
- Website: County website

Clark Township is a township in Marion County, Kansas, United States. As of the 2020 census, the township population was 144, including the west side of Pilsen.

== Geography ==
Clark Township covers an area of 36 square miles (93.2 km^{2}).

== Communities ==
The township contains the following settlements:

- Unincorporated community of Pilsen (west of Remington Road). The east side is located in Clear Creek Township.

== Cemeteries ==
The township contains no cemeteries.
