= Highland Township, Morris County, Kansas =

Township in Morris County, Kansas, U.S.

Highland Township
- Township
- Location within Morris County
- Coordinates: 38.745878°N 96.767165°W
- Country: United States
- State: Kansas
- County: Morris

Area
  - Total: 34.61 sq mi (89.6 km^{2})
  - Land: 34.53 sq mi (89.4 km^{2})
  - Water: 0.08 sq mi (0.21 km^{2}) 0.23%

Population (2020)
  - Total: 74
  - Density: 2.1/sq mi (0.83/km^{2})
- Time zone: UTC-6 (CST)
  - Summer (DST): UTC-5 (CDT)
- Area code: 785

Highland Township is a township in Morris County, Kansas, United States. As of the 2020 census, its population was 74.

== Geography ==
Highland Township covers an area of 34.61 square miles (89.6 square kilometers).

=== Adjacent townships ===
- Township 5, Morris County (north)
- Township 4, Morris County (east)
- Township 9, Morris County (southeast)
- Township 7, Morris County (south)
- Township 6, Morris County (west)
- Overland Township, Morris County (northwest)

=== Major highways ===
- K-4
- K-149
