= Blaine Township, Marion County, Kansas =

Blaine Township Marion County, Kansas
- Township
- Location within Marion County

- Location within state of Kansas
- Coordinates: 38.5658084°N 97.2058448°W
- Country: United States
- State: Kansas
- County: Marion

Area
  - Total: 36 sq mi (93 km^{2})

Dimensions
  - Length: 6.0 mi (9.7 km)
  - Width: 6.0 mi (9.7 km)
- Elevation: 1,381 ft (421 m)

Population (2020)
  - Total: 187
  - Density: 5.2/sq mi (2.0/km^{2})
- Time zone: UTC−6 (CST)
  - Summer (DST): UTC−5 (CDT)
- Area code: 620
- FIPS code: 20-07125
- GNIS ID: 477120
- Website: County website

Blaine Township is a township in Marion County, Kansas, United States. As of the 2020 census, the township population was 187, including the city of Tampa.

== Geography ==
Blaine Township covers an area of 36 square miles (93.2 km^{2}).

== Communities ==
The township contains the following settlements:

- City of Tampa.

== Cemeteries ==
The township contains the following cemeteries:

- Hackler Cemetery (aka Tampa Cemetery), located in Section 24 T17S R2E.

There are nearby cemeteries north in Banner Township, Dickinson County, Kansas:

- College Hill Cemetery.

== Transportation ==
K-15 highway passes north to south through the township.
