= Caldwell, Kansas =

City in Sumner County, Kansas

- City
- Flag

- Location within Sumner County and Kansas

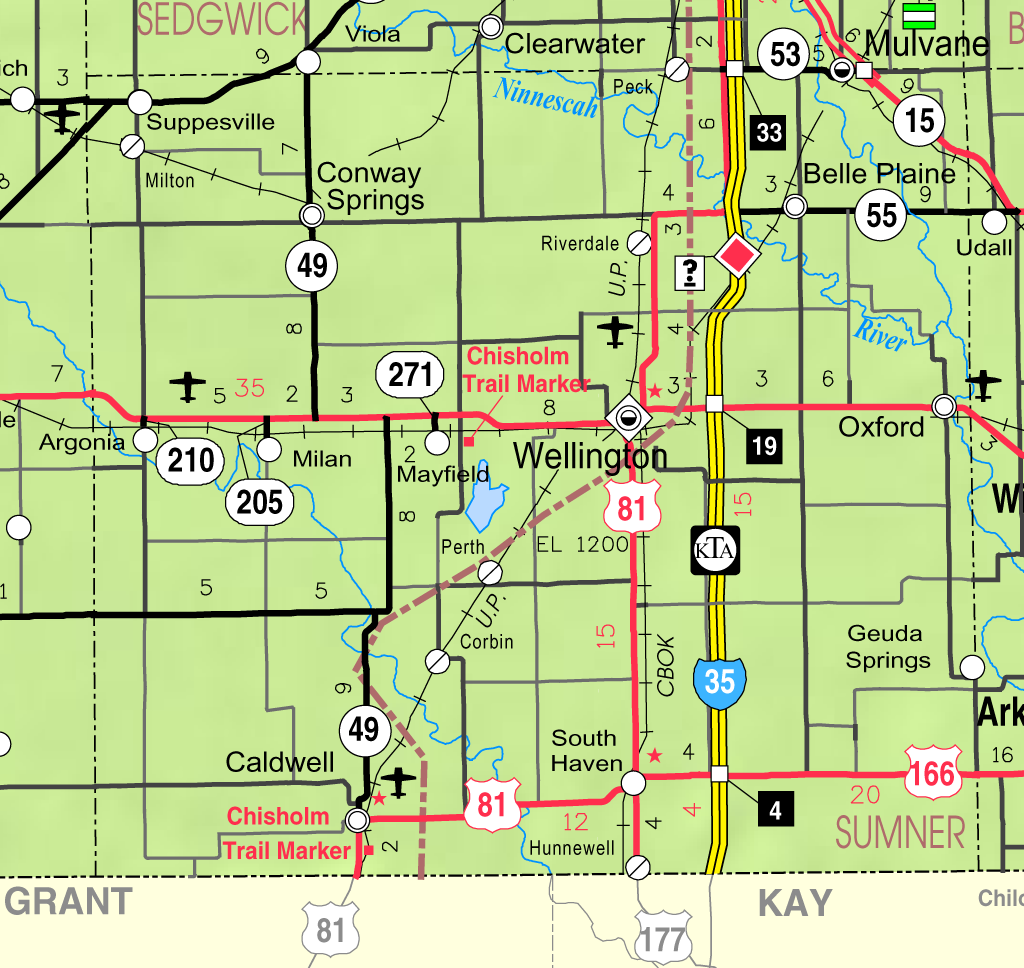
- KDOT map of Sumner County (legend)
- Coordinates: 37°02′06″N 97°36′32″W
- Country: United States
- State: Kansas
- County: Sumner
- Founded: 1871
- Incorporated: 1879
- Named for: Alexander Caldwell

Area
  - Total: 1.07 sq mi (2.77 km^{2})
  - Land: 1.07 sq mi (2.77 km^{2})
  - Water: 0 sq mi (0.00 km^{2})
- Elevation: 1,152 ft (351 m)

Population (2020)
  - Total: 1,025
  - Density: 958/sq mi (370/km^{2})
- Time zone: UTC-6 (CST)
  - Summer (DST): UTC-5 (CDT)
- ZIP Code: 67022
- Area code: 620
- FIPS code: 20-09900
- GNIS ID: 485550
- Website: cityofcaldwellks.com

Caldwell is a city in Sumner County, Kansas, United States. As of the 2020 census, the population of the city was 1,025.

== History ==
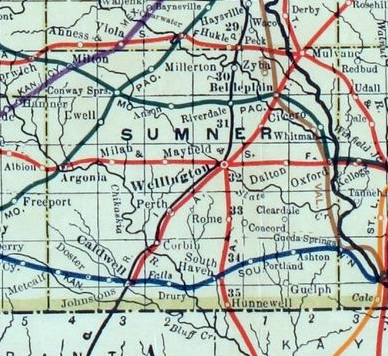
1915 railroad map of Sumner County

Near Caldwell is a precontact Plains Village period settlement called the Buresh site, which has yielded clues about Native American lifeways prior to the arrival of people of European and African descent.

Caldwell was founded in 1871. It is named for Senator Alexander Caldwell. Caldwell was incorporated as a city in 1879. The first post office in Caldwell was established in May 1871. The Chisholm Trail ran along the east side of the community from 1867 to 1871.

In 1887, the Chicago, Kansas and Nebraska Railway built a branch line north–south from Herington to Caldwell. This branch line connected Herington, Lost Springs, Lincolnville, Antelope, Marion, Aulne, Peabody, Elbing, Whitewater, Furley, Kechi, Wichita, Peck, Corbin, Wellington and Caldwell. This branch line was extended to Pond Creek, Oklahoma in 1888, and connected Caldwell, Renfrow, Medford and Jefferson (the original Pond Creek). By 1893, it was incrementally built to Fort Worth, Texas. This railroad foreclosed in 1891 and was taken over by Chicago, Rock Island and Pacific Railway, which shut down in 1980 and reorganized as Oklahoma, Kansas and Texas Railroad, merged in 1988 with Missouri Pacific Railroad, merged in 1997 with Union Pacific Railroad. Most locals still refer to this railroad as the "Rock Island."

In 1985, the Caldwell sixth grade class under the direction of their teacher Larry Miller started a successful campaign to have the ornate box turtle named the state reptile of Kansas. They gained support from around the country and on April 14, 1986, the governor of Kansas came to their school and signed the official bill, adding a new official symbol to the state of Kansas.

During the annual Homecoming celebration in the fall of 1986, the Mayor of Caldwell signed a proclamation declaring that Caldwell would forever be known as the "Ornate Box Turtle Capital of the World" and a couple of years later a professional wildlife artist was hired to paint a portrait of an ornate box turtle on the side of a downtown building on Main Street.

== Geography ==
According to the United States Census Bureau, the city has a total area of 1.09 square miles (2.82 km^{2}), all land.

=== Climate ===
The climate in this area is characterized by hot, humid summers and generally mild to cool winters. According to the Köppen Climate Classification system, Caldwell has a humid subtropical climate, abbreviated "Cfa" on climate maps.

== Demographics ==
Historical population
| Census | Pop. | Note | %± |
|---|---|---|---|
| 1880 | 1,005 | | — |
| 1890 | 1,642 | | 63.4% |
| 1900 | 1,574 | | −4.1% |
| 1910 | 2,205 | | 40.1% |
| 1920 | 2,191 | | −0.6% |
| 1930 | 2,046 | | −6.6% |
| 1940 | 1,962 | | −4.1% |
| 1950 | 2,000 | | 1.9% |
| 1960 | 1,788 | | −10.6% |
| 1970 | 1,540 | | −13.9% |
| 1980 | 1,401 | | −9.0% |
| 1990 | 1,351 | | −3.6% |
| 2000 | 1,284 | | −5.0% |
| 2010 | 1,068 | | −16.8% |
| 2020 | 1,025 | | −4.0% |
U.S. Decennial Census

=== 2020 census ===
The 2020 United States census counted 1,025 people, 469 households, and 255 families in Caldwell. The population density was 958.8 per square mile (370.2/km^{2}). There were 574 housing units at an average density of 537.0 units per square mile (207.3 units/km^{2}). The racial makeup was 90.54% (928) white or European American (88.98% non-Hispanic white), 0.2% (2) black or African-American, 1.27% (13) Native American or Alaska Native, 0.49% (5) Asian, 0.0% (0) Pacific Islander or Native Hawaiian, 1.76% (18) from other races, and 5.76% (59) from two or more races. Hispanic or Latino of any race was 4.49% (46) of the population.

Of the 469 households, 21.1% had children under the age of 18; 40.7% were married couples living together; 30.9% had a female householder with no spouse or partner present. 40.1% of households consisted of individuals and 21.1% had someone living alone who was 65 years of age or older. The average household size was 1.8 and the average family size was 2.5. The percent of those with a bachelor's degree or higher was estimated to be 11.6% of the population.

22.3% of the population was under the age of 18, 6.3% from 18 to 24, 23.2% from 25 to 44, 23.6% from 45 to 64, and 24.5% who were 65 years of age or older. The median age was 42.8 years. For every 100 females, there were 105.0 males. For every 100 females ages 18 and older, there were 110.6 males.

The 2016–2020 5-year American Community Survey estimates show that the median household income was $36,103 (with a margin of error of +/- $10,480) and the median family income was $56,500 (+/- $20,841). Males had a median income of $31,250 (+/- $14,454) versus $20,972 (+/- $8,269) for females. The median income for those above 16 years old was $26,458 (+/- $5,333). Approximately, 16.1% of families and 23.9% of the population were below the poverty line, including 31.9% of those under the age of 18 and 15.9% of those ages 65 or over.

=== 2010 census ===
As of the census of 2010, there were 1,068 people, 495 households, and 277 families living in the city. The population density was 979.8 inhabitants per square mile (378.3/km^{2}). There were 642 housing units at an average density of 589.0 units per square mile (227.4 units/km^{2}). The racial makeup of the city was 95.2% White, 0.8% African American, 1.7% Native American, 0.1% Asian, 1.1% from other races, and 1.0% from two or more races. Hispanic or Latino of any race were 3.1% of the population.

There were 495 households, of which 23.6% had children under the age of 18 living with them, 45.5% were married couples living together, 7.3% had a female householder with no husband present, 3.2% had a male householder with no wife present, and 44.0% were non-families. 40.0% of all households were made up of individuals, and 22.1% had someone living alone who was 65 years of age or older. The average household size was 2.14 and the average family size was 2.85.

The median age in the city was 47.1 years. 21.1% of residents were under the age of 18; 6.5% were between the ages of 18 and 24; 19.7% were from 25 to 44; 28.6% were from 45 to 64; and 24% were 65 years of age or older. The gender makeup of the city was 48.0% male and 52.0% female.

=== 2000 census ===
As of the census of 2000, there were 1,284 people, 574 households, and 328 families living in the city. The population density was 1,169.3 inhabitants per square mile (451.5/km^{2}). There were 668 housing units at an average density of 608.3 units per square mile (234.9 units/km^{2}). The racial makeup of the city was 96.50% White, 0.08% African American, 1.32% Native American, 0.47% Asian, 0.08% from other races, and 1.56% from two or more races. Hispanic or Latino of any race were 1.17% of the population.

There were 574 households, out of which 25.8% had children under the age of 18 living with them, 48.8% were married couples living together, 6.4% had a female householder with no husband present, and 42.7% were non-families. 40.6% of all households were made up of individuals, and 23.0% had someone living alone who was 65 years of age or older. The average household size was 2.14 and the average family size was 2.88.

In the city, the population was spread out, with 21.7% under the age of 18, 6.1% from 18 to 24, 20.8% from 25 to 44, 22.7% from 45 to 64, and 28.7% who were 65 years of age or older. The median age was 46 years. For every 100 females, there were 88.8 males. For every 100 females age 18 and over, there were 81.6 males.

The median income for a household in the city was $26,991, and the median income for a family was $39,931. Males had a median income of $31,346 versus $19,453 for females. The per capita income for the city was $17,340. About 9.3% of families and 15.5% of the population were below the poverty line, including 17.8% of those under age 18 and 8.9% of those age 65 or over.

== Education ==
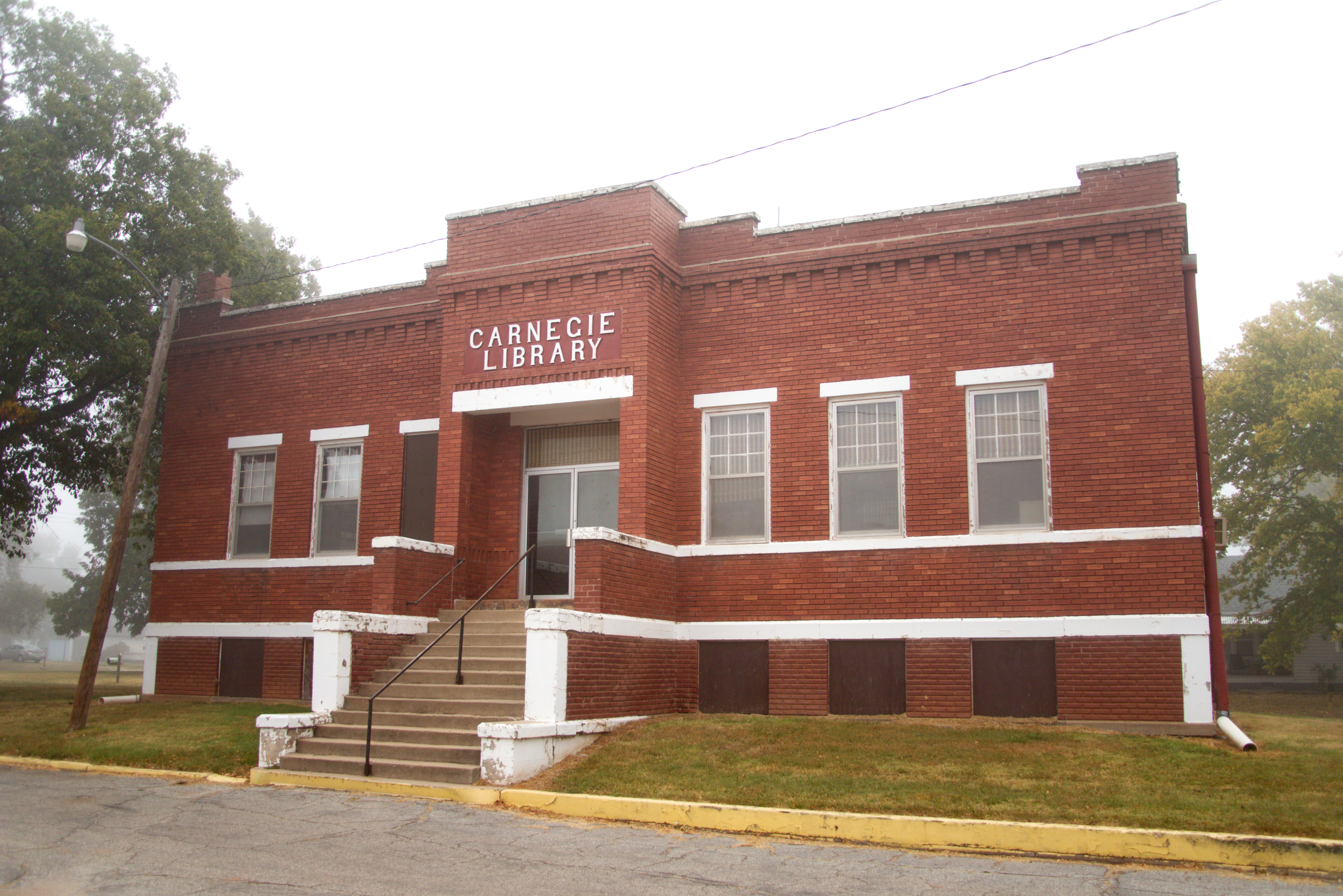
Caldwell Carnegie Library (2020)

The community is served by Caldwell USD 360 public school district.

== Transportation ==
The Caldwell Municipal Airport is a city-owned public-use airport located one nautical mile (1.2 mi; 1.9 km) east of Caldwell's central business district.

== Area attractions ==
- Chisholm Trail Markers
- Ghost Rider Silhouettes
- Caldwell Carnegie Library

== Area events ==
- Community Calendar
- Lighted Christmas Parade
- Oktoberfest
- Chisholm Trail Festival

== Notable people ==
- Gladys Anderson Emerson, scientist, educator, and historian
- Byron Berline, famous fiddle player
- The Dinning Sisters, singers and recording artists
- Max Showalter, film, television actor, musician

== See also ==
- Chisholm Trail and Route of the Trail in Kansas
- Abilene Trail
