= Township 9, Morris County, Kansas =

Township in Morris County, Kansas, U.S.

Township 9
- Township
- Location within Morris County
- Coordinates: 38.617983°N 96.660255°W
- Country: United States
- State: Kansas
- County: Morris

Area
  - Total: 78.087 sq mi (202.24 km^{2})
  - Land: 77.827 sq mi (201.57 km^{2})
  - Water: 0.26 sq mi (0.67 km^{2}) 0.33%

Population (2020)
  - Total: 300
  - Density: 3.9/sq mi (1.5/km^{2})
- Time zone: UTC-6 (CST)
  - Summer (DST): UTC-5 (CDT)
- Area code: 785

Township 9 is a township in Morris County, Kansas, United States. As of the 2020 census, its population was 300.

== Geography ==
Township 9 covers an area of 78.087 square miles (202.24 square kilometers).

=== Communities ===
- Wilsey

=== Adjacent townships ===
- Township 4, Morris County (north)
- Township 2, Morris County (northeast)
- Township 1, Morris County (east)
- Strong Township, Chase County (southeast)
- Diamond Creek Township, Chase County (south)
- Township 8, Morris County (southwest)
- Township 7, Morris County (west)
- Highland Township, Morris County (northwest)

=== Major highways ===
- US-56
