= Buresh site =

Archaeological site in Kansas, US

- Buresh Site (14SR303)
- U.S. National Register of Historic Places
- Nearest city: Caldwell, Kansas
- Area: 9 acres (3.6 ha)
- NRHP reference No.: 71000333
- Added to NRHP: May 14, 1971

The Buresh Archeological Site (14SR303), near Caldwell in Sumner County, Kansas, was listed on the National Register of Historic Places in on May 14, 1971.

The Buresh Site is part of here Bluff Creek complex, defined by archaeologist Tom Witty, part of the Middle Ceramic period and possibly related to the Washita focus of Oklahoma. Witty excavated the remains of four houses here. Two houses are square, one is oval, and one is rectangular.

The site yielded rounded ceramic jars and bowls, mainly tempered with sand or bone.

Radiocarbon dating estimated AD 1050 as the date of the site, but the dating method was deemed unreliable.
