= Buresh Farm =

- U.S. National Register of Historic Places
- Location within Iowa Location within the United States
- Location: West of Solon off Iowa Highway 382
- Coordinates: 41°48′37″N 91°33′46″W
- Area: 12 acres (4.9 ha)
- Built: c. 1894
- NRHP reference No.: 77000533
- Added to NRHP: April 29, 1977

The Buresh Farm is located west of Solon, Iowa, United States, along the north shore of Lake McBride. Its historic designation includes five frame structures, the farmhouse and four agricultural buildings. All except one of the buildings is thought to have been built around 1894. The house features a gable roof and wide eaves. It has a root cellar beneath it. The barn, granary and wash house all feature board-and-batten construction. The barn has a wide gable roof that slopes to a shed roof on its north elevation. The granary has a saltbox roof. The wash house was originally built as a summer kitchen. Although its construction date is unknown, the hog house appears to be newer than the rest based on its nonconforming shape. While not particularly unique, the farm buildings are largely unaltered and reflect a late 19th-century agricultural operation that is disappearing from Iowa. The farm was listed on the National Register of Historic Places in 1977.
