= Bureš =

Bureš (feminine: Burešová) is a Czech and Slovak surname, which originated as a shortened form of the name Burian. The surname was first documented in 1563. A germanized form of the surname is Buresch and an anglicized form is Buresh. Notable people with the surname include:

- Charlotta Burešová (1904–1983), Czech painter and Holocaust survivor
- Dagmar Burešová (1929–2018), Czech lawyer and politician
- Jakub Bureš (born 1981), Czech footballer
- Jan Bureš (1926–2012), Czech neurophysiologist and electrophysiologist
- Jaroslav Bureš (born 1954), Czech politician
- Ondřej Bureš (born 1966), Czech swimmer
- Tomáš Bureš (born 1978), Czech footballer

== See also ==
- Doris Bures (born 1962), Austrian politician
- Karl Buresch (1878–1936), Austrian politician and lawyer
