= Clear Creek Township, Marion County, Kansas =

Clear Creek Township Marion County, Kansas
- Township
- Location within Marion County

- Location within the state of Kansas
- Coordinates: 38.4740889°N 96.9405006°W
- Country: United States
- State: Kansas
- County: Marion

Area
  - Total: 76 sq mi (200 km^{2})

Dimensions
  - Length: 8.0 mi (12.9 km)
  - Width: 12.0 mi (19.3 km)
- Elevation: 1,424 ft (434 m)

Population (2020)
  - Total: 450
  - Density: 5.9/sq mi (2.3/km^{2})
- Time zone: UTC-6 (CST)
  - Summer (DST): UTC-5 (CDT)
- Area code: 620
- FIPS code: 20-13750
- GNIS ID: 477143
- Website: County website

Clear Creek Township is a township in Marion County, Kansas, United States. As of the 2020 census, the township population was 450, including the city of Lincolnville, and unincorporated communities of Antelope and the eastern side of Pilsen.

== Geography ==
Clear Creek Township covers an area of 76 square miles (196.8 km^{2}).

== Communities ==
The township contains the following settlements:

- City of Lincolnville.
- Unincorporated community of Antelope.
- Unincorporated community of Pilsen (east of Remington Road). The west side is located in Clark Township.

== Cemeteries ==
The township contains the following cemeteries:

- Evangelical Lutheran Cemetery (aka Lincolnville Cemetery), located in Section 1 T18S R4E.
- Lincolnville Cemetery (aka Evangelical Luther Church Cemetery), located in Section 11 T18S R4E.
- Pilsen Cemetery (aka St. John Nepomocene Catholic Church Cemetery), located in Section 19 T18S R4E.

== Transportation ==
U.S. Route 77 passes through the township.
