= Lyon Township, Geary County, Kansas =

Lyon Township
- Township
- Location in Geary County
- Coordinates: 38°55′20″N 096°52′21″W
- Country: United States
- State: Kansas
- County: Geary

Area
  - Total: 43.98 sq mi (113.91 km^{2})
  - Land: 43.45 sq mi (112.54 km^{2})
  - Water: 0.53 sq mi (1.37 km^{2}) 1.2%
- Elevation: 1,142 ft (348 m)

Population (2020)
  - Total: 250
  - Density: 5.8/sq mi (2.2/km^{2})
- GNIS feature ID: 0476700

Lyon Township is a township in Geary County, Kansas, United States. As of the 2020 census, its population was 250.

== History ==
Lyon Township was established in 1877. It was named for Gen. Nathaniel Lyon.

== Geography ==
Lyon Township covers an area of 43.98 square miles (113.9 km^{2}) and contains no incorporated settlements.

The streams of Carry Creek, Lyon Creek, Otter Creek and Schuler Branch run through this township.
