= Caldwell Municipal Airport (Kansas) =

- IATA: none; ICAO: none; FAA LID: 01K

Summary
- Airport type: Public
- Owner: City of Caldwell
- Serves: Caldwell, Kansas
- Elevation AMSL: 1,157 ft (353 m)
- Coordinates: 37°02′12″N 097°35′08″W
- Interactive map of Caldwell Municipal Airport

Runways
Direction	Length		Surface
Direction	ft	m	Surface
17/35	2,460	750	Turf

Statistics (2008)
- Aircraft operations: 900
- Source: Federal Aviation Administration

Caldwell Municipal Airport (FAA LID: 01K) is a city-owned public-use airport located one nautical mile (1.2 mi; 1.9 km) east of the central business district of Caldwell, a city in Sumner County, Kansas, United States.

== Facilities and aircraft ==
Caldwell Municipal Airport covers an area of 80 acres (32 ha) at an elevation of 1,157 feet (353 m) above mean sea level. It has one runway designated 17/35 with a turf surface measuring 2,460 by 110 feet (750 by 34 m). For the 12-month period ending November 19, 2008, the airport had 900 general aviation aircraft operations, an average of 75 per month.

== See also ==
- List of airports in Kansas
