= Lost Springs Township, Kansas =

Lost Springs Township Marion County, Kansas
- Township
- Location within Marion County

- Location within the state of Kansas
- Coordinates: 38.5657369°N 96.9853574°W
- Country: United States
- State: Kansas
- County: Marion

Area
  - Total: 36 sq mi (93 km^{2})

Dimensions
  - Length: 6.0 mi (9.7 km)
  - Width: 6.0 mi (9.7 km)
- Elevation: 1,457 ft (444 m)

Population (2020)
  - Total: 150
  - Density: 4.2/sq mi (1.6/km^{2})
- Time zone: UTC-6 (CST)
  - Summer (DST): UTC-5 (CDT)
- Area code: 620
- FIPS code: 20-42850
- GNIS ID: 477137
- Website: County website

Lost Springs Township is a township in Marion County, Kansas, United States. As of the 2020 census, the township population was 150, including the city of Lost Springs.

== Geography ==
Lost Springs Township covers an area of 36 square miles (93.2 km^{2}).

== Communities ==
The township contains the following settlements:

- City of Lost Springs.

== Cemeteries ==
The township contains the following cemeteries:

- Lost Springs Cemetery, located in Section 23 T17S R4E.
- Lost Springs Station Cemetery (records no longer available, cemetery no longer exists), located in Section 20 T17S R4E.
- Pleasant Hill Cemetery, located in Section 32 T17S R4E.
- St. Pauls Lutheran Church Cemetery, located in Section 6 T17S R4E.

== Transportation ==
U.S. Route 77 highway passes north to south through the township.
