= Blakely Township, Kansas =

Blakely Township
- Township
- Location in Geary County
- Coordinates: 38°54′50″N 096°45′41″W
- Country: United States
- State: Kansas
- County: Geary

Area
  - Total: 35.84 sq mi (92.82 km^{2})
  - Land: 35.83 sq mi (92.81 km^{2})
  - Water: 0.0039 sq mi (0.01 km^{2}) 0.01%
- Elevation: 1,300 ft (400 m)

Population (2020)
  - Total: 113
  - Density: 3.1/sq mi (1.2/km^{2})
- GNIS ID: 485529

Blakely Township is a township in Geary County, Kansas, United States. As of the 2020 census, its population was 113.

== Geography ==
Blakely Township covers an area of 35.84 square miles (92.8 km^{2}) and contains no incorporated settlements. According to the USGS, it contains three cemeteries: Salchow, Skiddy and Wetzel.

The stream of Thomas Creek runs through this township.
