= Caldwell Municipal Airport (Texas) =

- IATA: none; ICAO: KRWV; FAA LID: RWV

Summary
- Airport type: Public
- Owner: City of Caldwell
- Serves: Caldwell, Texas
- Elevation AMSL: 391 ft (119 m)
- Coordinates: 30°30′56″N 096°42′15″W

Map
- Location within Texas

Runways
Direction	Length		Surface
Direction	ft	m	Surface
15/33	3,252	991	Asphalt

Statistics (2006)
- Aircraft operations: 2,700
- Source: Federal Aviation Administration

Caldwell Municipal Airport (ICAO: KRWV, FAA LID: RWV, formerly 14R) is a city-owned, public-use airport located 1 nautical mile (2 km) southwest of the central business district of Caldwell, a city in Burleson County, Texas, United States.

Although most U.S. airports use the same three-letter location identifier for the FAA and IATA, this airport is assigned RWV by the FAA but has no designation from the IATA.

== Facilities and aircraft ==
Caldwell Municipal Airport covers an area of 49 acres (20 ha) and has one runway (15/33) with an asphalt surface measuring 3,252 x 50 feet (991 x 15 m). For the 12-month period ending March 24, 2006, the airport had 2,700 general aviation aircraft operations, an average of 225 per month.

== See also ==
- List of airports in Texas
