= Union Township, Dickinson County, Kansas =

Union Township
- Township
- Location in Dickinson County
- Coordinates: 38°44′25″N 096°59′01″W
- Country: United States
- State: Kansas
- County: Dickinson

Area
  - Total: 36.2 sq mi (93.7 km^{2})
  - Land: 36.11 sq mi (93.52 km^{2})
  - Water: 0.073 sq mi (0.19 km^{2}) 0.2%
- Elevation: 1,296 ft (395 m)

Population (2020)
  - Total: 158
  - Density: 4.38/sq mi (1.69/km^{2})
- GNIS feature ID: 0476862

Union Township is a township in Dickinson County, Kansas, United States. As of the 2020 census, its population was 158.

== Geography ==
Union Township covers an area of 36.18 square miles (93.7 km^{2}) and contains no incorporated settlements. According to the USGS, it contains one cemetery, Saint Paul.

The streams of Lime Creek and West Branch Lyon Creek run through this township.
