= Lyon Township, Dickinson County, Kansas =

Lyon Township
- Township
- Location in Dickinson County
- Coordinates: 38°39′10″N 096°59′06″W
- Country: United States
- State: Kansas
- County: Dickinson

Area
  - Total: 33.66 sq mi (87.17 km^{2})
  - Land: 33.32 sq mi (86.31 km^{2})
  - Water: 0.33 sq mi (0.86 km^{2}) 0.99%
- Elevation: 1,385 ft (422 m)

Population (2020)
  - Total: 221
  - Density: 6.63/sq mi (2.56/km^{2})
- GNIS feature ID: 0476984

Lyon Township is a township in Dickinson County, Kansas, United States. As of the 2020 census, its population was 221.

== Geography ==
Lyon Township covers an area of 33.66 square miles (87.2 km^{2}) and surrounds the incorporated settlement of Herington. According to the USGS, it contains one cemetery, Saint Johns.

The stream of Kohls Creek runs through this township.
