= Lincolnville, Kansas =

City in Marion County, Kansas

- City
- Location within Marion County and Kansas

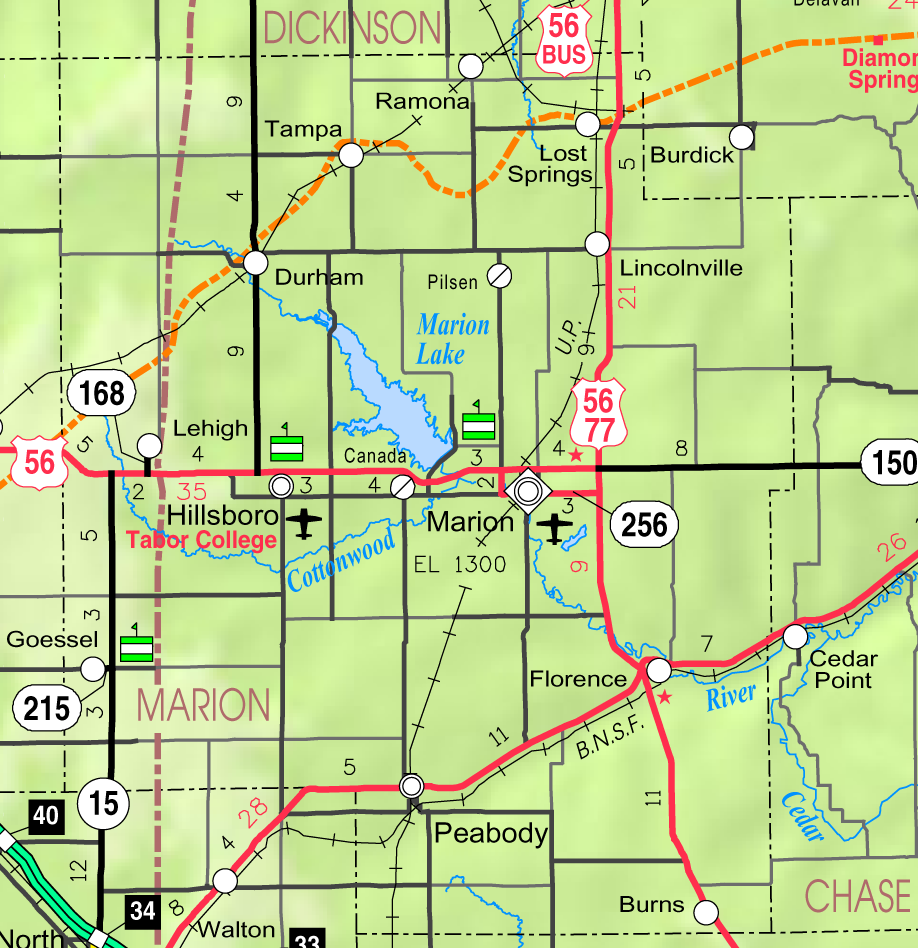
- KDOT map of Marion County (legend)
- Coordinates: 38°29′39″N 96°57′41″W
- Country: United States
- State: Kansas
- County: Marion
- Township: Clear Creek
- Platted: 1872, 1887
- Incorporated: 1910
- Named for: Abraham Lincoln

Government
  - Type: Mayor–Council
  - Mayor: Barbara Kaiser

Area
  - Total: 0.22 sq mi (0.58 km^{2})
  - Land: 0.22 sq mi (0.58 km^{2})
  - Water: 0 sq mi (0.00 km^{2})
- Elevation: 1,424 ft (434 m)

Population (2020)
  - Total: 168
  - Density: 750/sq mi (290/km^{2})
- Time zone: UTC-6 (CST)
  - Summer (DST): UTC-5 (CDT)
- ZIP Code: 66858
- Area code: 620
- FIPS code: 20-41325
- GNIS ID: 2395715

Lincolnville is a city in Marion County, Kansas, United States. As of the 2020 census, the population of the city was 168. The city was named after Abraham Lincoln, the 16th president of the United States. It is located northeast of Marion, west of the intersection of U.S. Route 77 (aka U.S. Route 56) highway and 290th Street, adjacent to the Union Pacific Railroad.

== History ==
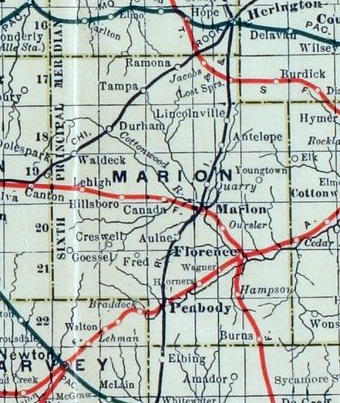
1915 railroad map of Marion County

=== Early history ===
For many millennia, the Great Plains of North America was inhabited by nomadic Native Americans. From the 16th century to 18th century, the Kingdom of France claimed ownership of large parts of North America. In 1762, after the French and Indian War, France secretly ceded New France to Spain, per the Treaty of Fontainebleau.

=== 19th century ===
In 1802, Spain returned most of the land to France. In 1803, most of the land for modern day Kansas was acquired by the United States from France as part of the 828,000 square mile Louisiana Purchase for 2.83 cents per acre.

In 1854, the Kansas Territory was organized, then in 1861 Kansas became the 34th U.S. state. In 1855, Marion County was established within the Kansas Territory, which included the land for modern day Lincolnville.

The first settlers to the area were Heman Deal (1860) and Thomas Wise, Jr (1863). A post office was established in Lincolnville on December 31, 1868.

The first Lincolnville plat was filed by Robert C McAllister on May 18, 1872, but the patent from the United States government was not granted until August 23, 1878. President Abraham Lincoln is the city's namesake.

In 1887, the Chicago, Kansas and Nebraska Railway built a branch line north-south from Herington through Lincolnville to Caldwell. It foreclosed in 1891 and was taken over by Chicago, Rock Island and Pacific Railway, which shut down in 1980 and reorganized as Oklahoma, Kansas and Texas Railroad, merged in 1988 with Missouri Pacific Railroad, and finally merged in 1997 with Union Pacific Railroad. Most locals still refer to this railroad as the "Rock Island".

== Geography ==
Lincolnville is located in the scenic Flint Hills and Great Plains of the state of Kansas. According to the United States Census Bureau, the city has a total area of 0.22 square miles (0.57 km^{2}), all land.

=== Climate ===
The climate in this area is characterized by hot, humid summers and generally mild to cool winters. According to the Köppen Climate Classification system, Lincolnville has a humid subtropical climate, abbreviated "Cfa" on climate maps.

== Demographics ==
Historical population
Census	Pop.	Note	%±
1920	260		—
1930	270		3.8%
1940	255		−5.6%
1950	228		−10.6%
1960	244		7.0%
1970	218		−10.7%
1980	235		7.8%
1990	197		−16.2%
2000	225		14.2%
2010	203		−9.8%
2020	168		−17.2%
U.S. Decennial Census

=== 2020 census ===
The 2020 United States census counted 168 people, 78 households, and 47 families in Lincolnville. The population density was 746.7 per square mile (288.3/km^{2}). There were 93 housing units at an average density of 413.3 per square mile (159.6/km^{2}). The racial makeup was 88.1% (148) white or European American (86.31% non-Hispanic white), 0.0% (0) black or African-American, 0.0% (0) Native American or Alaska Native, 0.0% (0) Asian, 0.0% (0) Pacific Islander or Native Hawaiian, 0.6% (1) from other races, and 11.31% (19) from two or more races. Hispanic or Latino of any race was 10.71% (18) of the population.

Of the 78 households, 23.1% had children under the age of 18; 47.4% were married couples living together; 20.5% had a female householder with no spouse or partner present. 35.9% of households consisted of individuals and 21.8% had someone living alone who was 65 years of age or older. The average household size was 1.9 and the average family size was 2.5. The percent of those with a bachelor's degree or higher was estimated to be 10.7% of the population.

19.6% of the population was under the age of 18, 8.9% from 18 to 24, 20.2% from 25 to 44, 33.9% from 45 to 64, and 17.3% who were 65 years of age or older. The median age was 47.0 years. For every 100 females, there were 95.3 males. For every 100 females ages 18 and older, there were 92.9 males.

The 2016–2020 5-year American Community Survey estimates show that the median household income was $39,737 (with a margin of error of +/- $4,939) and the median family income was $53,750 (+/- $41,726). Males had a median income of $33,333 (+/- $8,504) versus $25,625 (+/- $24,843) for females. The median income for those above 16 years old was $31,875 (+/- $8,655). Approximately, 10.2% of families and 9.8% of the population were below the poverty line, including 0.0% of those under the age of 18 and 8.6% of those ages 65 or over.

=== 2010 census ===
As of the census of 2010, there were 203 people, 81 households, and 54 families residing in the city. The population density was 922.7 inhabitants per square mile (356.3/km^{2}). There were 102 housing units at an average density of 463.6 per square mile (179.0/km^{2}). The racial makeup of the city was 95.6% White, 2.5% Native American, 1.5% from other races, and 0.5% from two or more races. Hispanic or Latino of any race were 5.4% of the population.

There were 81 households, of which 39.5% had children under the age of 18 living with them, 44.4% were married couples living together, 16.0% had a female householder with no husband present, 6.2% had a male householder with no wife present, and 33.3% were non-families. 27.2% of all households were made up of individuals, and 13.6% had someone living alone who was 65 years of age or older. The average household size was 2.51 and the average family size was 3.11.

The median age in the city was 36.8 years. 30.5% of residents were under the age of 18; 7.5% were between the ages of 18 and 24; 24.6% were from 25 to 44; 23.2% were from 45 to 64; and 14.3% were 65 years of age or older. The gender makeup of the city was 52.2% male and 47.8% female.

== Area events ==
- Octoberfest, first Saturday in October.

== Area attractions ==
Lincolnville has two buildings listed on the National Register of Historic Places (NRHP).

- Bethel School (NRHP), 5.25 miles east of Lincolnville on 290th Street.
- Island Field Ranch House (NRHP), 3.5 miles south of Lincolnville on U.S. Route 77.

== Government ==
The Lincolnville government consists of a mayor and five council members. The council meets the 1st Monday of each month at 7PM.

- City Hall, 218 W Main St.
- Fire Department, 307 W Main St.
- Police Department.
- U.S. Post Office, 319 S Adams St.

== Education ==
The community is served by Centre USD 397 public school district. The Centre High School is a member of T.E.E.N., a shared video teaching network between five area high schools.

- Centre School; 2374 310th St, Lost Springs, KS; between Lost Springs and Lincolnville, east of U.S. 77 highway.

== Media ==
=== Print ===
- Marion County Record, local newspaper from Marion.
- Hillsboro Free Press, free newspaper for greater Marion County area.

== Infrastructure ==
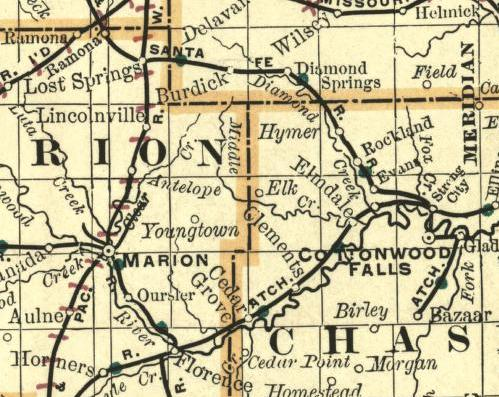
1893 railroad map

=== Transportation ===
The U.S. Route 77 highway runs through the east side of Lincolnville and almost parallel to the Union Pacific Railroad, which is approximately five blocks west of the highway.

The Chicago, Rock Island and Pacific Railroad formerly provided passenger rail service to Lincolnville on their mainline from Minneapolis to Houston until at least 1951. As of 2025, the nearest passenger rail station is located in Newton, where Amtrak's Southwest Chief stops once daily on a route from Chicago to Los Angeles.

=== Utilities ===
- Electricity: Rural is provided by Flint Hills RECA.

== See also ==
- Centre High School
- National Register of Historic Places listings in Marion County, Kansas
- Historical Maps of Marion County, Kansas
