= U.S. Route 77 =

Highway in the United States

U.S. Route 77
- US 77 highlighted in red

Route information
- Length: 1,305 mi (2,100 km)
- Existed: 1926–present

Major junctions
- South end: Fed. 101 / Fed. 180 at the Mexican Border in Brownsville, TX
- I-37 near Corpus Christi, TX; I-10 at Schulenburg, TX; I-35 near Waco, TX; I-35E at Red Oak, TX; I-20 / I-30 / I-35E at Dallas, TX; I-40 at Oklahoma City, OK; I-44 at Oklahoma City, OK; I-35 at El Dorado, KS; I-70 / US 40 at Junction City, KS; I-80 at Lincoln, NE
- North end: I-29 at Sioux City, IA

Location
- Country: United States
- States: Texas, Oklahoma, Kansas, Nebraska, Iowa

Highway system
- United States Numbered Highway System; List; Special; Divided
← US 76	→ US 78

U.S. Route 77 (US 77) is a major north–south United States Numbered Highway which extends for 1,305 miles (2,100 km) in the central United States. As of 2005, Its southern terminus is in Brownsville, Texas, at Veteran's International Bridge on the Mexican border, where it connects with both Mexican Federal Highway 101 and Mexican Federal Highway 180, and the highway's northern terminus is in Sioux City, Iowa, at an interchange with Interstate 29 (I-29), less than 1/2 mile (800 m) north of the Nebraska state line.

It is unsigned in and around Dallas, Texas. Its historic segment through South Dakota and Minnesota was decommissioned with the advent of I-29 but otherwise the route has been spared the decommissioning that has shortened other US Highways. The route has major freeway sections in Oklahoma City including the Broadway Extension connecting suburban Edmond to downtown Oklahoma City.

== Route description ==
=== Texas ===
Lengths
	mi	km
TX	471	758
OK	268	431
KS	234	377
NE	190	310
IA	0.3	0.48
Total	1,305	2,100

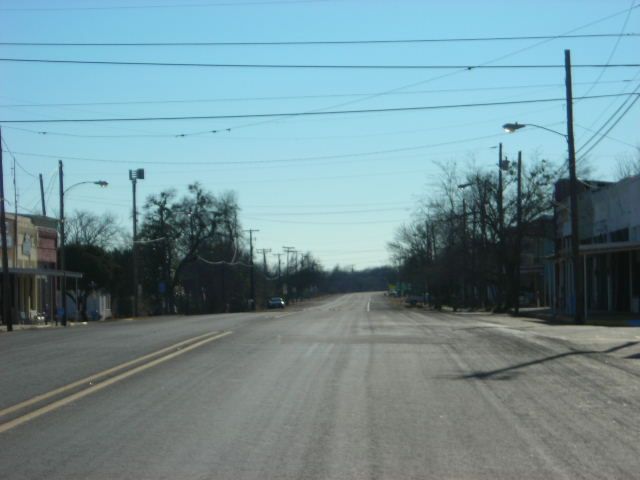
Looking south along US 77 in Milford, Texas

The section between the Oklahoma–Texas state line and Waco is mostly co-located with I-35 and the I-35E branch through Dallas, and where it is co-located, it is not signed.

The two stretches in Texas that are not co-located are a stretch wholly within the city of Denton and a longer stretch from near Red Oak, to Hillsboro, the reason being that US 77 is a separate road between the two, serving the town of Waxahachie.

As of 2004, US 77 Alternate has a northern terminus in Hallettsville, Texas. It rejoins US 77 at Refugio, Texas. While the main line of US 77 passes through Victoria, Alternate US 77 veers to the west to serve Yoakum and Cuero.

The southern end extends from I-37 near Corpus Christi to Harlingen, where it merges with US 83 and runs through the cities of Harlingen, San Benito and Brownsville to its southern terminus at the United States/Mexico border.

A section of US 77 located in the Giddings, Texas area is known as the Martin Luther King Jr. Memorial Highway.

Another section of US 77, from I-37 to SH 44 in Nueces County, was redesignated I-69/US 77 in 2011.

As of 2017, US 77 is being co-signed with I-35E as part of the reconstruction co-signed between Denton and I-635.

=== Oklahoma ===
In Oklahoma, US 77 runs north–south, paralleling I-35, connecting Texas to Kansas and running for 268 miles (431 km) through the central part of the state. It passes through many major cities, including Ardmore, Oklahoma City and Norman, Guthrie, and Ponca City. It has a freeway section, the Broadway Extension, connecting Oklahoma City to its northern suburb Edmond, in addition to sections that are co-flagged with I-35 and I-235.

=== Kansas ===
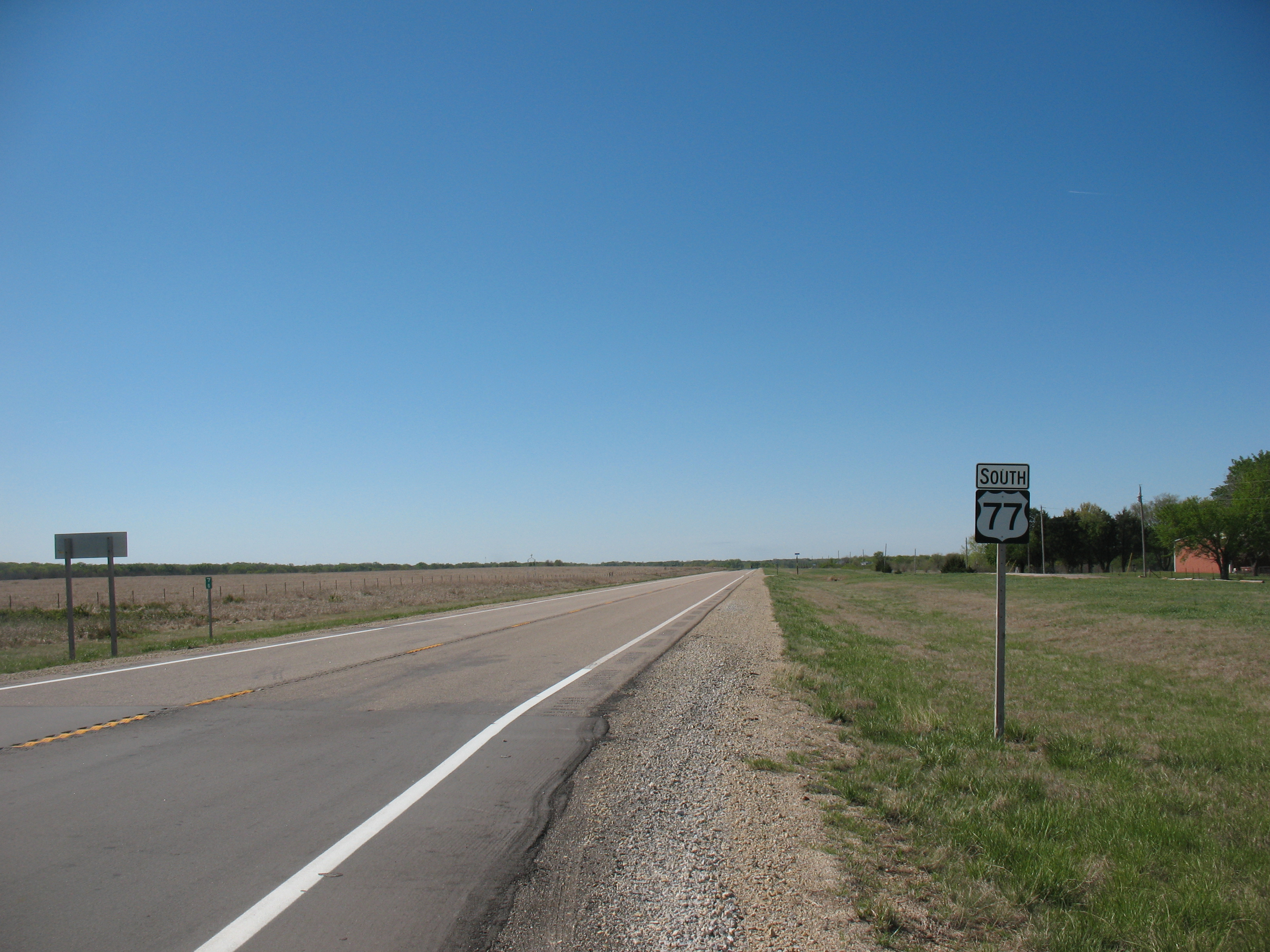
US 77, 7.7 miles north of the KTA

US 77 runs for 234 miles (377 km) in Kansas. Between the US 40 junction and the Cowley County line is designated as a Blue Star Memorial Highway. In Cowley County, it is the Robert B. Docking Memorial Highway. Near Arkansas City it is the Walnut Valley Greenway.

From Nebraska to US 24 and from K-15 to Arkansas City, it is part of the National Highway System.

=== Nebraska ===
In Nebraska, US 77 is a major north–south artery connecting the capital city of Lincoln with outlying areas to the north and south. The highway is designated as the Homestead Expressway from Beatrice to I-80 at Lincoln. In Lincoln, US 77 becomes a full controlled-access expressway before it overlaps with I-80 for about eight miles (13 km). North of I-80, US 77 continues as an expressway to Wahoo, where it becomes a two-lane undivided road. It remains a two-lane highway except for two sections near Fremont, which are four-lane divided highways. The expressway north of Fremont is shared with US 275 and Nebraska Highway 91. US 275 and NE 91 separate from US 77 just south of Winslow, and US 77 continues north as a two-lane highway until it meets US 75 at Winnebago. The two highways run together to the junction of I-129 and US 20 at Dakota City, where US 75 breaks off and US 77 continues northward as a divided highway through South Sioux City before exiting the state via the Siouxland Veterans Memorial Bridge.

=== Iowa ===
US 77 barely enters Iowa. After crossing the Missouri River via the Veteran's Bridge at Sioux City, the highway ends at a diamond interchange with I-29. Its total length in Iowa is slightly more than four-tenths mile (640 m).

== History ==
US 77 previously extended north through South Dakota to Ortonville, Minnesota. It followed the current I-29 corridor up to the Toronto, South Dakota area, and then followed current South Dakota Highway 15 north to Milbank, South Dakota. After reaching Milbank, it traveled to the east, concurrently with US 12 to Ortonville, where it ended at an intersection with US 75. The segment between Milbank and Ortonville was decommissioned in 1966; the remaining South Dakota portion along with most of the highway's length in Iowa section was removed in October 1981. Portions of the old highway in the Sioux Falls, South Dakota area exist today as South Dakota Highway 115, and further north, as Moody County Road 77 and Brookings County Road 77.

== Future ==
US 77 is currently being upgraded between the Mexican border in Brownsville to Victoria, Texas, as I-69E.

== Major intersections ==
Texas
I-69E / US 83 at the Veterans International Bridge at Los Tomates at the Mexico–United States border in Brownsville. US 77/US 83 travels concurrently to Harlingen. I-69E/US 77 travels concurrently to north of Raymondville.
I-169 in Brownsville
I-2 / US 83 in Harlingen
I-69E in Kingsville. The highways travel concurrently to Corpus Christi.
I-37 / I-69E in Corpus Christi. I-37/US 77 travels concurrently to west-northwest of Corpus Christi.
US 181 north of Sinton
US 183 in Refugio
Future I-69 / Future I-69E / Future I-69W / US 59 south-southwest of Victoria. US 59/US 77 travels concurrently to southwest of Victoria.
US 87 in Victoria
US 90 in Schulenburg
I-10 in Schulenburg
US 290 in Giddings
US 79 in Rockdale
US 190 southeast of Cameron. The highways travel concurrently to Cameron.
I-35 in Waco. The highways travel concurrently to northeast of Hillsboro.
US 84 in Bellmead
I-35 in Waxahachie
US 287 in Waxahachie
I-35E in Red Oak. The highways travel concurrently to Denton.
I-20 in Dallas
US 67 in Dallas. The highways travel concurrently through Dallas.
I-30 / US 67 in Dallas
I-635 in Dallas
US 377 in Denton. The highways travel concurrently through Denton.
US 377 / US 380 in Denton
I-35 in Denton. The highways travel concurrently to south of Thackerville, Oklahoma.
US 82 in Gainesville
Oklahoma
US 70 in Ardmore
I-35 north of Springer
I-35 in Davis
I-35 in Norman. The highways travel concurrently to Oklahoma City.
I-240 / US 62 in Oklahoma City. US-62/US-77 travels concurrently through Oklahoma City.
I-35 / I-40 / I-235 / US 62 / US 270 in Oklahoma City. I-235/US-77 travels concurrently through Oklahoma City.
I-44 / I-235 in Oklahoma City
I-35 in Edmond. The highways travel concurrently to Guthrie.
I-35 in Perry
US 64 in Perry. The highways travel concurrently through Perry.
US 412 north of Perry
US 60 in Tonkawa. The highways travel concurrently to Ponca City.
US 177 east-northeast of Tonkawa. The highways travel concurrently to Ponca City.
Kansas
US 166 in Arkansas City. The highways travel concurrently through Arkansas City.
US 160 in Winfield
US 54 / US 400 in Augusta. US-54/U-77 travels concurrently to El Dorado. US 77/US 400 travels concurrently to Pickrell Corner.
I-35 north of El Dorado
US 50 in Florence. The highways travel concurrently around a roundabout in Florence.
US 56 east-northeast of Marion. The highways travel concurrently to east of Herington.
I-70 / US 40 in Junction City.
US 24 north of Riley. The highways travel concurrently to east of Riley.
US 36 in Marysville. The highways travel concurrently through Marysville.
Nebraska
US 136 in Beatrice
US 6 in Lincoln
I-80 in Lincoln. The highways travel concurrently to north-northeast of Lincoln.
I-180 / US 34 in Lincoln
US 30 / US 275 north of Fremont. US 77/US 275 travels concurrently to south of Winslow.
US 75 in Winnebago. The highways travel concurrently to South Sioux City.
I-129 / US 20 / US 75 in South Sioux City
Iowa
I-29 in Sioux City

== See also ==
=== Related U.S. Routes ===
- U.S. Route 177
- U.S. Route 277
- U.S. Route 377

=== Bannered and suffixed routes ===
- U.S. Route 77 Alternate
  - U.S. Route 77 Alternate Business (Yoakum, Texas)
- U.S. Route 77 Business (Waco, Texas)

Browse numbered routes
← K-76	KS	→ K-78
