= National Register of Historic Places listings in Grant County, Oklahoma =

Location of Grant County in Oklahoma

This is a list of the National Register of Historic Places listings in Grant County, Oklahoma.

This is intended to be a complete list of the properties on the National Register of Historic Places in Grant County, Oklahoma, United States. The locations of National Register properties for which the latitude and longitude coordinates are included below, may be seen in a map.

There are 6 properties listed on the National Register in the county.

This National Park Service list is complete through NPS recent listings posted March 14, 2025.

== Current listings ==
	Name on the Register	Image	Date listed	Location	City or town	Description
1	Bank of Nashville		June 20, 2002 (#02000655)	Junction of U.S. Route 64 and Main Ave. 36°39′57″N 98°03′02″W	Nash	
2	Dayton School		September 8, 1988 (#88001369)	Southeast of Lamont; 36°36′44″N 97°29′53″W	Lamont	
3	Deer Creek General Merchandise Store	Deer Creek General Merchandise Store	March 8, 1984 (#84003024)	S. Main St. 36°48′19″N 97°31′11″W	Deer Creek	
4	Grant County Courthouse	Grant County Courthouse	August 23, 1984 (#84003027)	112 E. Guthrie St. 36°48′31″N 97°44′03″W	Medford	
5	Medford Bathhouse and Swimming Pool		September 8, 1988 (#88001368)	Guthrie and 5th Sts. 36°48′24″N 97°44′20″W	Medford	
6	Pond Creek Masonic Lodge No. 125	Pond Creek Masonic Lodge No. 125	September 3, 2010 (#10000622)	126 Broadway Ave. 36°40′10″N 97°47′53″W	Pond Creek	

== See also ==
- List of National Historic Landmarks in Oklahoma
- National Register of Historic Places listings in Oklahoma
