= U.S. Route 81 in Oklahoma =

Segment of American highway

U.S. Highway 81
- Chisholm Trail Historic Route
- US 81 highlighted in red

Route information
- Maintained by ODOT
- Length: 229.28 mi (368.99 km)
- Existed: December 7, 1926–present

Major junctions
- South end: US 81 south of Terral
- US 70 in Waurika; US 277 from Ninnekah to Chickasha; I-44 / H.E. Bailey Turnpike in Chickasha; US 62 in Chickasha; I-40 in El Reno; US 412 in Enid; US 60 / US 64 from Enid to Pond Creek
- North end: US-81 south of Caldwell, KS

Location
- Country: United States
- State: Oklahoma
- Counties: Jefferson, Stephens, Grady, Canadian, Kingfisher, Garfield, Grant

Highway system
- United States Numbered Highway System; List; Special; Divided; Oklahoma State Highway System; Interstate; US; State; Turnpikes
← SH-80	→ SH-82

U.S. Route 81 (US-81) is a north–south U.S. highway running through the central United States' Great Plains region, from Fort Worth, Texas to the U.S.–Canadian border at Pembina, North Dakota. A 229.28-mile (368.99 km) segment of the highway lies within the state of Oklahoma. US-81 crosses the Red River from Texas south of Terral, passing through several Oklahoma cities, such as Chickasha, El Reno, Kingfisher, and Enid, before entering Kansas north of Renfrow.

The route of US-81 was originally served by the Chisholm Trail, which was used to drive cattle from Texas to Abilene, Kansas. US-81 was established as a primary route of the U.S. highway system at the time of the system's original designation. US-81 was established through Oklahoma on December 7, 1926.

== Route description ==
US-81 enters the state of Oklahoma from Montague County, Texas by crossing a bridge across the Red River into Jefferson County. Just north of the river, the highway passes through Terral, its first Oklahoma town. The route takes a due north course north of Terral, with a Union Pacific rail line, which US-81 will parallel throughout its time in Oklahoma, lying just to the west of the highway, and the Red River running to the west of that. US-81 has its first highway junction in Oklahoma in Ryan, where it serves as the western terminus of State Highway 32 (SH-32). North of Ryan, the highway begins paralleling Beaver Creek, a tributary of the Red River, and bypasses Sugden to the east. US-81 intersects US-70 on the southeastern outskirts of Waurika, the county seat of Jefferson County. As US-81 passes north of the town, it begins roughly following the course of Cow Creek, which spills into Beaver Creek in Waurika. The highway curves northeast to bisect Addington before returning to a due north course as it enters Stephens County.

From the Jefferson–Stephens county line, US-81 takes a due north course to Comanche, where it meets SH-53. Upon leaving Comanche, US-81 curves northwest before resuming its course to the north, passing through the gap between Sunray and Empire City. The highway then enters Duncan, the Stephens County seat, where US-81 passes through town. Further north, an interchange offers travelers an opportunity to join the Duncan Bypass, which parallels US-81 to the west. At this same interchange, eastbound SH-7 toward Davis can be accessed, while westbound SH-7 forms a concurrency with the Duncan Bypass proceeding west of 16th Street. US-81 continues north through Duncan to the city's northern limit, where SH-7 is to the west, bound for Lawton. US-81 continues north, entering Marlow. In Marlow, the route serves as the western terminus of SH-29. US-81 then continues north out of Stephens County.

The next county that US-81 serves is Grady County. The highway heads due north from the county line to the outskirts of Rush Springs, where its only business route continues north to serve the town. Mainline US-81 veers away to the west, bypassing Rush Springs. Along this bypass, the highway intersects SH-17. US-81 then reunites with its business loop as it leaves the Rush Springs area. The road runs just west of Agawam before coming to Ninnekah, where US-277 and SH-19 join US-81 in a concurrency. SH-19 splits away from US-81 further north in Ninnekah, while US-277 follows US-81 north into the city of Chickasha. On the south end of Chickasha, US-81/US-277 have an interchange with Interstate 44 (I-44), which at this point is following the H.E. Bailey Turnpike, a toll road serving southwestern Oklahoma. The two highways follow 4th Street north to downtown, where they split ways at Choctaw Avenue, which carries US-62 and SH-9; US-277 turns east along Choctaw, while US-81 turns west. US-81, accompanied by US-62 and SH-9, proceeds west, crossing over the Stillwater Central Railroad as well as Line Creek. On the west edge of Chickasha, US-81 splits away from US-62/SH-9, turning north as a two-lane highway. The route then crosses the Washita River and continues north through the incorporated town of Pocasset. Further north, in Minco, the highway begins a brief concurrency with SH-37. After one mile (1.6 km) following US-81, SH-37 splits away to the west, while SH-152 joins US-81 at the same intersection. The two highways then cross the Canadian River, the northern boundary of Grady County.

Upon landing on the north shore of the Canadian River, US-81 and SH-152 enter Canadian County. The first Canadian County town they encounter is Union City, where SH-152 turns east toward Oklahoma City. US-81 continues due north, passing from Union City into the Canadian County seat, El Reno, where it comes to an interchange with I-40/US-270. This is also the beginning of Interstate 40 Business, which proceeds north along US-81. The two routes serve as the western terminus of SH-66, the successor route to the celebrated US-66. US-81 and I-40 Business turn northwest, heading into downtown El Reno along Rock Island Boulevard. Downtown, the highways turn west along Wade Street before turning back to the north on Choctaw Avenue. I-40 Business turns west onto Sunset Drive, while US-81 continues due north along Choctaw out of town. As the highway continues north, it passes east of unincorporated Concho, and eleven miles (18 km) north of El Reno, the highway has an interchange with SH-3, forming the northwestern terminus of Oklahoma City's Northwest Expressway. SH-3 joins US-81, and the two highways head north into the town of Okarche.

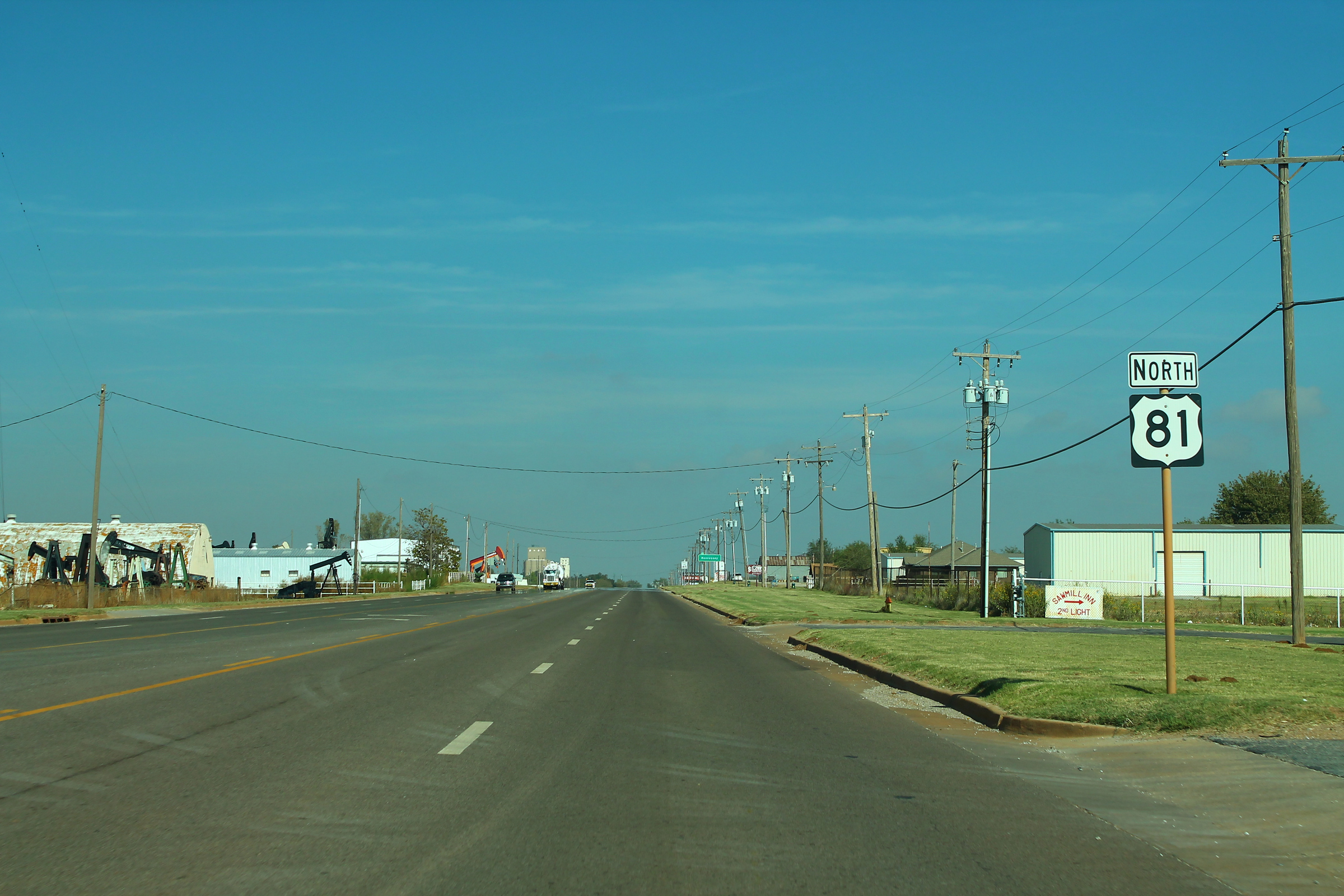
US 81 in Hennessey, Oklahoma

Okarche straddles the Canadian–Kingfisher county line, and it is in Okarche that US-81 and SH-3 enter Kingfisher County. After passing through the town, the two routes take a northeastern tack. As they approach the southern limits of the county seat, Kingfisher, they curve back to a due north course. In Kingfisher, the two highways intersect SH-33; SH-3 splits away from US-81 to turn west along SH-33 toward Watonga. US-81 continues north alone. Approximately five miles (8.0 km) north of Kingfisher, the road turns east, returning to a northerly course after about one mile (1.6 km). The highway then crosses the Cimarron River. North of the river, the route runs along the west edge of Dover. It then continues north to Hennessey, where it intersects SH-51. From Hennessey, US-81 continues north into Garfield County.

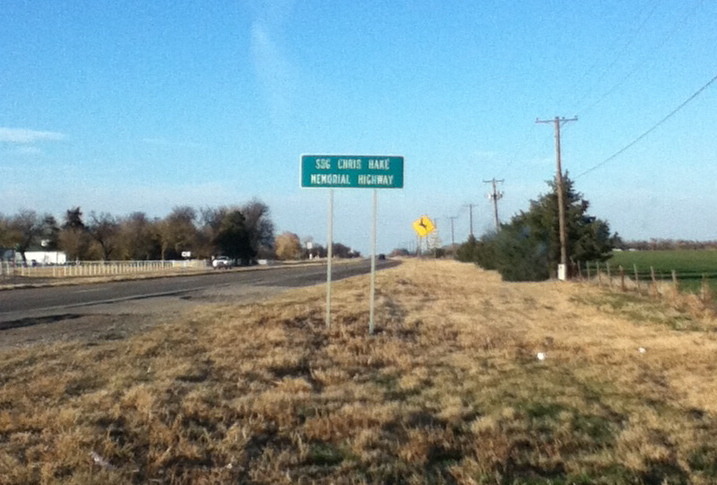
SSG Chris Hake Memorial Highway in Enid on US Highway 81

The first town that US-81 serves in Garfield County is Bison, an unincorporated place; the first incorporated town in the county is Waukomis, twenty miles (32 km) north of Hennessey. From Waukomis, the highway proceeds north to Vance Air Force Base, which it passes just east of. The highway then enters the city of Enid, running along Van Buren Street. At its intersection with Owen K. Garriott Road, US-81 also intersects US-60 and US-412. While US-412 continues straight through the intersection, US-60 forms a concurrency with US-81. The two highways continue north, then curve northeast and begin following North 4th Street, which carries US-64, creating a three-route concurrency. US-60/US-64/US-81 head due north through the northern reaches of Enid, serving as the eastern terminus of SH-45. They then leave Enid and Garfield County.

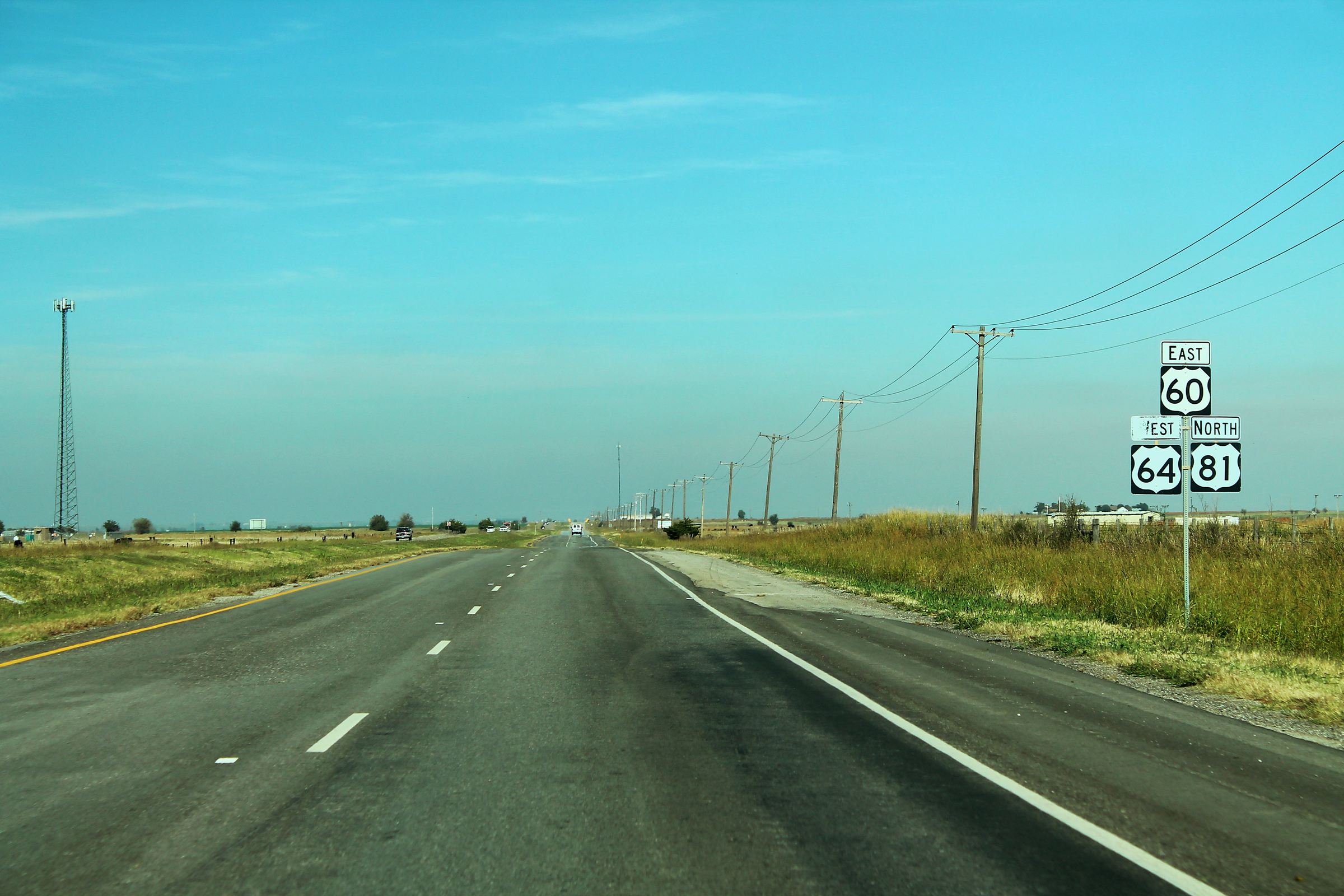
US 81, US 60, and US 64 Concurrency

The northernmost county US-81 serves in Oklahoma is Grant County. Still accompanied by US-60 and US-64, the route heads north from the county line for approximately 5 miles (8.0 km) before coming to a T intersection. Here, US-64 turns west, while US-81 turns east. After four miles (6.4 km), the highways come to the town of Pond Creek; here US-60 splits off toward Lamont, while US-81 heads north. US-81 crosses the Salt Fork of the Arkansas River north of Pond Creek, then turns northeast, bypassing the town of Jefferson to the north. The highway then comes to the town of Medford, county seat of Grant County. In Medford, the road intersects SH-11. From here, US-81 continues angling northeast across northern Grant County, passing the town of Renfrow, the northernmost town in Oklahoma along US-81. The route then exits the state of Oklahoma, passing into Sumner County, Kansas, heading north toward Caldwell.

== History ==
US-81's immediate predecessor was the original State Highway 2.

Prior to the establishment of the U.S. Highway System, US-81's general corridor through Oklahoma was the site of the Chisholm Trail, a principal route used on cattle drives from Texas to stockyards in Kansas. With the introduction of the auto trails, this corridor was served by the Meridian Highway. When the Oklahoma numbered highway system was established in 1925, the route that would eventually become US-81 was designated as State Highway 2. The US-81 designation was applied the following year, on December 7, 1926.

== SH-81A ==
State Highway 81A
- Location: Duncan, Oklahoma
- Length: 0.71 mi (1,140 m)

State Highway 81A is a short loop off of US-81 in the city of Duncan. This route is 0.71 miles (1.14 km) long. The highway begins at the intersection of US-81 and 13th Street, following 13th Street north to SH-7. SH-81A then turns east along SH-7 to 9th Street, where it turns north again. SH-81A forms the western terminus of SH-7A at Main Street. It then turns west along Main Street until it intersects US-81 again at 16th Street. This is the northern terminus of SH-81A. The entire highway is unsigned.

== Junction list ==
County	Location	mi	km	Destinations	Notes
Red River		0.00	0.00	US 81 south – Ringgold, Bowie	Continuation into Texas
Red River		0.00	0.00	Texas–Oklahoma state line at the southern bank of the river	
Jefferson	Ryan	10.3	16.6	SH-32 east (Washington Street)	Western terminus of SH-32
Jefferson	Waurika	20.2	32.5	US 70	
Stephens	Comanche	35.2	56.6	SH-53	
Stephens	Duncan	43.4	69.8	SH-81A	Southern terminus of SH-81A
Stephens	Duncan	44.0	70.8	SH-7 / Duncan Bypass	Interchange
Stephens	Duncan	44.9	72.3	SH-81A	Northern terminus of SH-81A
Stephens	Marlow	55.1	88.7	SH-29	Western terminus of SH-29
Grady	Rush Springs	63.3	101.9	US 81 Bus. north	Southern terminus of US-81 Bus.
Grady	Rush Springs	64.5	103.8	SH-17	
Grady	Rush Springs	65.9	106.1	US 81 Bus. south	Northern terminus of US-81 Bus.
Grady	Ninnekah	76.8	123.6	US 277 south / SH-19 west	Southern end of US-277/SH-19 concurrency
Grady	Ninnekah	79.7	128.3	SH-19 east	Northern end of SH-19 concurrency
Grady	Chickasha	81.9	131.8	I-44 / H.E. Bailey Turnpike – Oklahoma City, Lawton	Interchange; I-44 exit 80
Grady	Chickasha	83.8	134.9	US 277 north / US 62 / SH-9 east (Choctaw Avenue east)	Northern end of US-277 concurrency, Southern end of US-62/SH-9 concurrency
Grady	Chickasha	85.5	137.6	US 62 / SH-9 west	Northern end of US-62/SH-9 concurrency
Grady	Minco	103.3	166.2	SH-37 east	Southern end of SH-37 concurrency
Grady	Minco	104.7	168.5	SH-37 / SH-152 west	Northern end of SH-37 concurrency, southern end of SH-152 concurrency
Canadian	Union City	109.0	175.4	SH-152	Northern end of SH-152 concurrency
Canadian	El Reno	116.6	187.6	I-40 BL begins / I-40 – Oklahoma City, Amarillo	Interchange; I-40 exit 125; southern end of I-40 Bus. concurrency; eastern terminus of I-40 Bus.
Canadian	El Reno	117.1	188.5	SH-66 east	Western terminus of SH-66; former US 66 east
Canadian	El Reno	119.4	192.2	I-40 BL west (Sunset Drive)	Northern end of I-40 Bus. concurrency; former US 66 west
Canadian		130.6	210.2	SH-3 east (Northwest Expressway) – Oklahoma City	Interchange; southern end of SH-3 concurrency
Kingfisher	Kingfisher	143.0	230.1	SH-3 west / SH-33	Northern end of SH-3 concurrency
Kingfisher	Hennessey	161.5	259.9	SH-51	
Garfield	Enid	180.6	290.6	US 60 west / US 412 (Owen K. Garriott Road) – Cherokee Strip Regional Heritage Center, Welcome Center	Southern end of US-60 concurrency; access to INTEGRIS Bass Baptist Health Center
Garfield	Enid			Chestnut Road west	Interchange
Garfield	Enid	184.6	297.1	US 64 east (4th Street) / US 60 west / US 81 south (Van Buren Bypass)	Interchange; northbound access to US-64 east via U-turn north of exit; southern end of US-64 concurrency
Garfield	Enid	186.0	299.3	SH-45	Eastern terminus of SH-45
Grant		200.0	321.9	US 64 west	Northern end of US-64 concurrency
Grant	Pond Creek	204.1	328.5	US 60 east	Northern end of US-60 concurrency
Grant	Medford	215.2	346.3	SH-11	
Grant		230.0	370.1	US-81 north – South Haven	Continuation into Kansas
1.000 mi = 1.609 km; 1.000 km = 0.621 mi: Concurrency terminus; Tolled

U.S. Route 81
Previous state: Texas	Oklahoma	Next state: Kansas
