= Medford Public Schools (Oklahoma) =

School district in Oklahoma, United States

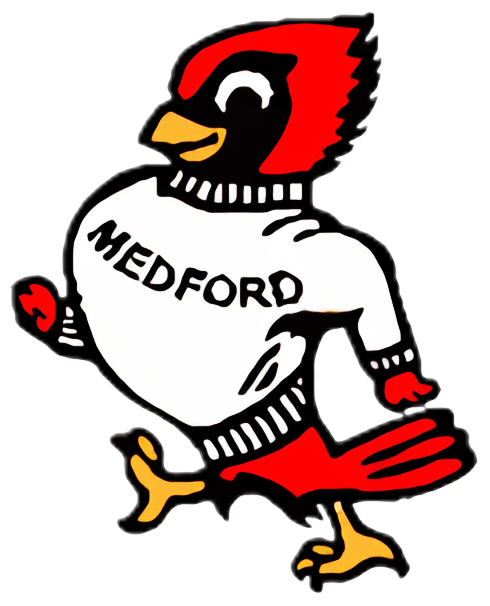

Location
- Medford, Oklahoma Grant County, Oklahoma United States of America

District information
- Grades: Pre-K — 12th Grade
- Established: February 23, 1894
- Superintendent: Tyler Locke (2019 - present)
- Schools: 1 conjoined school building
- NCES District ID: 4019620

Students and staff
- Students: 272
- Teachers: 27
- Student–teacher ratio: 10.2:1
- Athletic conference: Cherokee Strip Conference
- District mascot: Cardinals
- Colors: Red and White

Other information
- Website: Homepage

The Medford Public School District is a public U.S. school district based in Medford, Oklahoma.

The district, mostly in Grant County, includes Medford, Manchester, Renfrow, and Wakita, as well as portions of Jefferson. It also includes the unincorporated areas of Numa and Clyde. The district's territory extends into Alfalfa County.

== History ==
The school district was established on February 23, 1894. The Encyclopedia of Oklahoma History and Culture stated it was "apparently the first in Grant County".

In 1919 a one story school building with 17 classrooms opened.

In 1950, voters approved a bond, on a 181-59 basis, for the district to issue bonds to establish a school bus service. Previously, the district did not have any school buses. There had been parents at a school board meeting who had requested school buses.

In 1960 a bond election occurred for a building that would replace the 1919 facility. The voters voted in favor of the bond. The new school building was to have a cost of $330,000, with $285,000 of it to be raised from the bond.

In 2011, the Wakita school district, which was facing a decreasing population, consolidated into the Medford district. The Medford district was to have a seven seat school board instead of a five seat school board, and it was expected to receive 40 more students.

== Athletics ==
Medford Public Schools compete in Classes C and B of Oklahoma School Athletics. Athletic programs hosted by the school include softball, basketball, baseball, football, track and field, cross country, and golf.

State Academic Championships
Year	Sport	Class
1945	Football	Class C
1946	Football	Class C
1983	Girls’ Track	Class B
1984	Boys’ Basketball	Class A
1988	Boys’ Track	Class B
1990	Girls’ Track	Class B
1992	Girls’ Track	Class B
1999	Football	Class C

== Area Served ==
The Medford Public School System is one of three school districts to be centered in Grant County, Oklahoma. The other two schools being Pond Creek-Hunter and Deer Creek-Lamont.

Medford Schools’ influence has grown over time as districts such as Wakita, Jefferson, and Renfrow high schools have been absorbed due to population decrease.

== Notable alumni ==
- James Kilian, former professional football player, who won the high school a state championship in 1999.
- Page Belcher, an Oklahoma representative who served from 1953 - 1973.
- Cindy Ross, first female president of Cameron University.
