= Noel Loomis =

American journalist

- Born: Noel Miller Loomis; April 3, 1905; Wakita, Grant, Oklahoma
- Died: September 7, 1969 (aged 64); San Diego, California
- Education: University of Oklahoma
- Occupations: Writer; editor; teacher
- Spouse: Elizabeth Moore Green

Noel Loomis (April 3, 1905 – September 7, 1969) was an American writer, principally of western, mystery and science-fiction. Born and raised in the American West, he was sufficiently familiar with that territory to write a useful history of the Wells Fargo company.

== Personal life ==
Noel Loomis was born Noel Miller Loomis on April 3, 1905, in the Oklahoma Territory town of Wakita, in the Cherokee Strip, and raised in Texico, in the New Mexico Territory, and in the West Texas town of Slaton. In later life he lived in Decanso, in the San Diego, California, Back Country from 1956.

He married Dorothy Moore Green, who was also a writer, in 1945. There is evidence that he had a first wife named Johnie or Jonie, who was the mother of his children. Records indicate he had at least two children: James L. Loomis (1928–2013) and Mary Nell Loomis (1935–2011)

== Career and honors ==
- 1921 Attended Clarendon College
- 1929–1979 Freelance writer
- 1930 Attended University of Oklahoma
- 1953 National survey of writers' incomes and terms in writers' contracts
- 1954–1955 President of Western Writers of America
- 1955–1956 President of Hulburd Grove Improvement Association
- 1958 Spur Award Novel: Short Cut to Red River by Noel Loomis (Macmillan)
- 1958–1969 Instructor in English, San Diego State College, San Diego, California
- 1959 Spur Award Short Story: Grandfather Out of the Past by Noel Loomis (Frontiers West)
- 1963–1969 Director of Writers Workshop
- American Academy of Political and Social Science
- American Association of University Professors
- American Historical Association
- PEN International

He also worked variously as a printer, newspaperman and editor.

== Writings ==
Selected works.

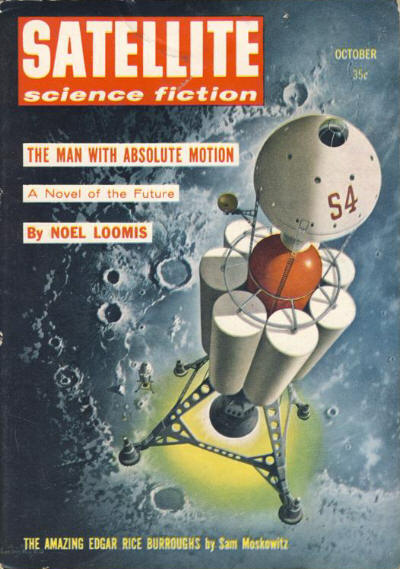
Loomis's 1955 novel The Man with Absolute Motion saw its first American publication as the cover story on the October 1958 issue of Satellite Science Fiction

=== Fiction ===
- Murder Goes to Press (1937)
- City of Glass (1942, Startling Stories, exp. 1955 by Columbia Publications)
- Iron Men (1945, Startling Stories)
- Electron Eat Electron (1946, Planet Stories)
- Mr. Zytztz Goes to Mars (1948, Pulp Magazine)
- Turnover Time (1949, Startling Stories)
- Rim of the Caprock (1952)
- The Buscadero (1953, bath gunsmoke)
- We Breathe For You (1953, Startling Stories)
- The Ultimate Planet (1949, Thrilling Wonder Stories)
- The Man With the Absolute Motion (1955, as by Silas Water)
- Short Cut to Red River (1958)
- Grandfather Out of the Past (1959)

=== Non-fiction ===
- Pedro Vial and the Roads to Santa Fe, a description of Pedro Vial's exploratory expeditions (1967) (with Abraham P Nasatir)
- The Texan Santa Fe Pioneers (1958)
- Wells Fargo, a history of the Wells Fargo company (1968)

=== Media work ===
- Bonanza TV series, various episodes
- Have Gun, Will Travel TV series, various episodes
- Cheyenne (TV series), 1956 episode: "Mustang Trail"
- Johnny Concho (film directed by Don McGuire), United Artists, 1956

This production, starring Frank Sinatra and other well-known actors, by accounts an unusual production, has to date (2014) never been released on any of the usual portable media, e.g. VHS or DVD.

== Other ==
=== Editing ===
- Linecasting Operator-Machinist, Harding, Edwin B.; Noel M. Loomis, ed.

=== Teaching ===
- 1958–1969 Assistant professor of English at San Diego State College in Southern California
