= Gulf Railroad =

The Gulf Railroad
Overview
- Locale: Oklahoma
- Dates of operation: 1896–1899

Technical
- Track gauge: 4 ft 8 1/2 in (1,435 mm) standard gauge
- Length: 36.7 miles (59.1 km)

The Gulf Railroad was incorporated under the laws of Oklahoma Territory on June 2, 1896. In 1897 it built 10.1 miles of track from Wakita, Oklahoma to Medford, Oklahoma. In the 1897-1898 timeframe, it built 26.6 miles of track from Medford to Blackwell, Oklahoma. The President of the railroad, W.A. Bradford, Jr., purchased 160 acres of land and established the town of Deer Creek, Oklahoma along that section of the line on March 14, 1898.

The railroad was sold to the Hutchinson and Southern Railway Company, with the property conveyed by two deeds dated March 22, 1898 and November 13, 1899. That company in turn was sold to the Atchison, Topeka and Santa Fe Railway on December 20, 1899. The trackage has since been abandoned.
