= Numa, Oklahoma =

Ghost Town in Oklahoma, United States

- Ghost town
- Location within Oklahoma Location within the United States
- Coordinates: 36°48′12.11″N 97°36′22.18″W
- Country: United States
- State: Oklahoma
- County: Grant
- Established: 1893
- Elevation: 1,120 ft (340 m)
- Time zone: UTC-6 (Central (CST))
  - Summer (DST): UTC-5 (CDT)
- Area code: 580

Numa was a farming community that was established early on in what was then "L" County in the Oklahoma Territory. This area was part of the Cherokee Strip Outlet which was opened for settlement on September 16, 1893.

It is located in modern-day Grant County, between Medford and Deer Creek. It was located seven miles east and one-half mile south of Medford. It was located along the Gulf Railroad (later the Atchison, Topeka, and Santa Fe) that connected the towns of Manchester, Wakita, Medford, and Deer Creek.

The Numa Post Office was established on April 20, 1898. Numa had amenities such as a community hall, granary, weigh station, and a rail spur. Many members of the settler community made the run from Caldwell, Kansas and continued their relationships (economic and familial) with contacts from that entry point.

Much of the initial amenities were abandoned as members of the community moved to more favorable living locations such as Medford, Ponca City, and Enid.

The post office officially closed in 1943. The last post master was Mrs. Laura (Fredrick) Fitzgerald Rogers, who along with her first husband, Earl Jesse Fitzgerald, ran a general store in Numa for many years.

The Santa Fe Railroad ceased operation in 1972. The tracks have since been removed and the railroad right-of-way has been abandoned.

The grain elevator operated by Fuquay Grain was the last surviving business left from the original town.

Much of the history of Numa was explained to the author by his father (oral in 1994 upon the death of Juanita Feagan/Cote/Gates). During the visit to Numa, all that remained of Numa was a sign along the side of the road, debris and overgrown bushes where the community hall had once existed, and the derelict (but perhaps still functional) granary that was next to the rail spur.

== 21st century ==
In 2001, most of the remnants had been cleared and a new granary had been established.

The current grain elevator is operated by the W.B. Johnston Grain Company, Johnston Enterprises, Inc., of Enid, Oklahoma. Johnston's build a new office and bins across the road east from the site of the original elevator to accommodate the larger trucks used to move grain today.

On the evening of April 30, 2012, there was an outbreak of severe thunderstorms that spawned several tornadoes. The bins for the W.B. Johnston elevator were destroyed.

In July 2013, a wood-framed house as well as numerous outbuildings were moved to Numa from a nearby farm. This is the first permanent building in Numa in decades. A family moved in. The town is once again inhabited.
