= Pond Creek Masonic Lodge No. 125 =

- U.S. National Register of Historic Places
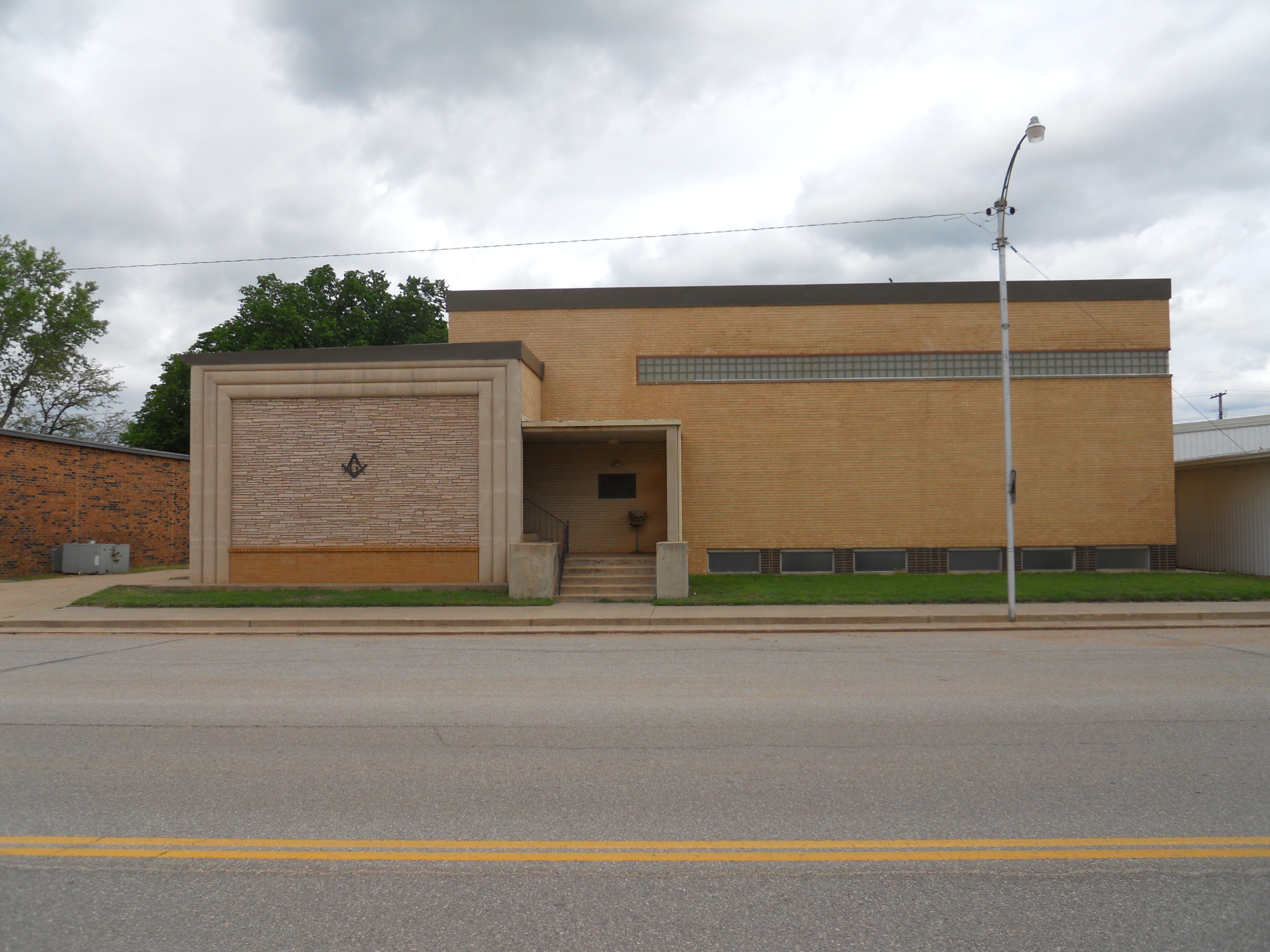

- Location within Oklahoma
- Location: 126 Broadway Avenue; Pond Creek, Oklahoma
- Coordinates: 36°40′10″N 97°47′53″W
- Built: 1953
- NRHP reference No.: 10000622
- Added to NRHP: September 3, 2010

The Pond Creek Masonic Lodge #125 is a National Register of Historic Places-listed building in Pond Creek, Grant County, Oklahoma. According to its NRHP listing, it is an exceptional example of modern architecture in a town whose architecture is otherwise traditional. Built in 1953, the architect was Dow Gumerson, who also designed the 1959 federal courthouse for the United States District Court for the Western District of Oklahoma in Oklahoma City.
