= Sand Creek, Oklahoma =

- Unincorporated community
- Location within Oklahoma Location within the United States
- Coordinates: 36°50′25″N 98°01′11″W
- Country: United States
- State: Oklahoma
- County: Grant
- Elevation: 1,129 ft (344 m)
- Time zone: UTC-6 (Central (CST))
  - Summer (DST): UTC-5 (CDT)
- Area code: 580
- GNIS feature ID: 1097728

Sand Creek is an unincorporated community in western Grant County, Oklahoma, United States. Sand Creek is located in the western part of the county, 6.2 miles (10.0 km) west-southwest of Wakita.

== Geography ==
The stream Sand Creek flows past the east side of the community.
