= Cindy Ross =

President of Cameron University
- In office 2002–2013

Personal details
- Born: December 7, 1950 Wakita, Oklahoma
- Children: 2
- Education: Oklahoma State University

Dr. Cynthia S. Ross (born December 7, 1950), better known as Cindy Ross, is a fifth generation Oklahoman whose work in higher education and administration lead to her pioneering roles for women. She is known primarily for her service as the first female president of Cameron University.

== Personal life ==
Dr. Cynthia Ross was born in Wakita, Oklahoma—one of three daughters. She was raised in Wakita through elementary school and attended junior high and high school in Medford, Oklahoma. Ross has two children, Garrett and Jordan.

== Education ==
Neither of Dr. Ross' parents had a college education, so college was not something regularly discussed by the family. Immediately out of high school, Ross went to Oklahoma State University (OSU) and dropped out after a year to be married. After seven years, Ross went back to OSU and attended college part-time while working full-time. Ross earned her baccalaureate, master's, and doctoral degrees from OSU in 1983, 1986, and 1989 respectively. Her undergraduate degree was in university studies while her master's and doctoral degrees were in higher education administration.

== Career ==
Dr. Ross started out her career at Oklahoma State as an administrative assistant under Academic Vice President Dr. Bogg. While working for OSU, Ross developed several policies in areas such as sexual harassment, as well as "family-friendly policies in dependent care leave and child care for working parents." In 1990, Ross went to the Oklahoma State Regents for Higher Education (OSRHE) in Oklahoma City. She started out there as Associate Vice Chancellor until she was promoted to Executive Vice Chancellor for Academic Affairs four years later. She is the first and only woman (thus far) to hold the position of Executive Vice Chancellor for Academic Affairs. Ross held this position until 2002. In 2002, Ross was chosen by Cameron University to serve as their first woman president—and only the third female college president in the state of Oklahoma. At Cameron University, she served for 11 years, retiring in 2013. In 2011, Dr. Ross was elected to BancFirst's board of directors.

== Achievements ==
- Inducted into the Oklahoma Women’s Hall of Fame (2011)
- Oklahoma State University College of Education Hall of Fame (2005)
- Stillwater Business and Professional Women of the Year (1983)
- Inducted in The Order of Saint Barbara for her support of the Army and Marine Corps
- OSU Distinguished Alumni Award (2014)
- Received the Martin Luther King, Jr. Humanitarian of the Year Award (2007)
- OU Board of Regents named an academic building on Cameron’s campus in her honor
- Higher Education Hall of Fame (2013)
- Elected to BancFirst Board of Directors (2011)
