= Ninnekah, Oklahoma =

- Town
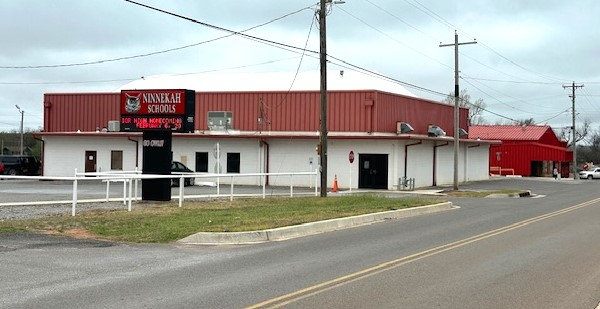
- School at Ninnekah in March 2025

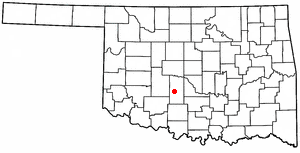
- Location of Ninnekah, Oklahoma
- Coordinates: 34°57′50″N 97°56′41″W
- Country: United States
- State: Oklahoma
- County: Grady

Area
  - Total: 10.18 sq mi (26.36 km^{2})
  - Land: 10.18 sq mi (26.36 km^{2})
  - Water: 0 sq mi (0.00 km^{2})
- Elevation: 1,155 ft (352 m)

Population (2020)
  - Total: 775
  - Density: 76/sq mi (29.4/km^{2})
- Time zone: UTC-6 (Central (CST))
  - Summer (DST): UTC-5 (CDT)
- ZIP code: 73067
- Area code: 405
- FIPS code: 40-52100
- GNIS feature ID: 2413050
- Website: ninnekahok.gov

Ninnekah is a town in Grady County, Oklahoma, United States. The population was 775 at the 2020 census, a 22.7% decrease from 2010.

== History ==
A post office was established at Ninnekah, Indian Territory on July 28, 1892. The name is from the Choctaw word, ninek, meaning "night" or "darkness."

At the time of its founding, Ninnekah was located in Pickens County, Chickasaw Nation.

== Geography ==
Ninnekah is located in west-central Grady County. It is bordered to the north by the city of Chickasha, the county seat. U.S. Route 81 passes through the town, leading north 7 miles (11 km) into Chickasha and south 32 miles (51 km) to Duncan. U.S. Route 277 splits west from US 81 in Ninnekah and leads 11 miles (18 km) to Cement, Oklahoma City is 49 miles (79 km) to the northeast via US 81 and Interstate 44.

According to the United States Census Bureau, the town has a total area of 10.2 square miles (26.4 km^{2}), all land.

== Demographics ==
Historical population
Census	Pop.	Note	%±
2000	994		—
2010	1,002		0.8%
2020	775		−22.7%
U.S. Decennial Census

=== 2020 census ===
As of the 2020 census, Ninnekah had a population of 775. The median age was 47.4 years. 19.7% of residents were under the age of 18 and 24.5% of residents were 65 years of age or older. For every 100 females there were 96.7 males, and for every 100 females age 18 and over there were 93.8 males age 18 and over.

0.8% of residents lived in urban areas, while 99.2% lived in rural areas.

There were 309 households in Ninnekah, of which 25.9% had children under the age of 18 living in them. Of all households, 54.0% were married-couple households, 15.9% were households with a male householder and no spouse or partner present, and 23.3% were households with a female householder and no spouse or partner present. About 22.3% of all households were made up of individuals and 14.9% had someone living alone who was 65 years of age or older.

There were 365 housing units, of which 15.3% were vacant. The homeowner vacancy rate was 4.3% and the rental vacancy rate was 19.0%.

Racial composition as of the 2020 census
Race	Number	Percent
White	645	83.2%
Black or African American	5	0.6%
American Indian and Alaska Native	54	7.0%
Asian	0	0.0%
Native Hawaiian and Other Pacific Islander	0	0.0%
Some other race	13	1.7%
Two or more races	58	7.5%
Hispanic or Latino (of any race)	32	4.1%

=== 2010 census ===
As of the 2010 census, Ninnekah had a population of 1,002.

=== 2000 census ===
As of the 2000 census, there were 994 people, 400 households, and 304 families residing in the town. The population density was 97.7 inhabitants per square mile (37.7/km^{2}). There were 440 housing units at an average density of 43.3 per square mile (16.7/km^{2}). The racial makeup of the town was 89.44% White, 0.60% African American, 3.82% Native American, 0.40% Asian, 0.50% from other races, and 5.23% from two or more races. Hispanic or Latino of any race were 1.91% of the population.

There were 400 households, out of which 31.0% had children under the age of 18 living with them, 62.0% were married couples living together, 10.3% had a female householder with no husband present, and 24.0% were non-families. 20.8% of all households were made up of individuals, and 7.3% had someone living alone who was 65 years of age or older. The average household size was 2.49 and the average family size was 2.85.

In the town, the population was spread out, with 23.5% under the age of 18, 9.2% from 18 to 24, 27.7% from 25 to 44, 28.7% from 45 to 64, and 11.0% who were 65 years of age or older. The median age was 39 years. For every 100 females, there were 98.8 males. For every 100 females age 18 and over, there were 94.9 males.

The median income for a household in the town was $31,181, and the median income for a family was $37,656. Males had a median income of $29,659 versus $21,328 for females. The per capita income for the town was $16,434. About 14.1% of families and 19.5% of the population were below the poverty line, including 30.3% of those under age 18 and 13.5% of those age 65 or over.
