= James Kilian =

American gridiron football player and coach (born 1980)

St. Olaf Oles
- Title: Head coach

Personal information
- Born: October 24, 1980 (age 46); Caldwell, Kansas, U.S.
- Listed height: 6 ft 4 in (1.93 m)
- Listed weight: 215 lb (98 kg)

Career information
- High school: Medford (Medford, Oklahoma)
- College: Tulsa
- NFL draft: 2005: 7th round, 229th overall pick

Career history

Playing
- Kansas City Chiefs (2005–2006)*; Atlanta Falcons (2007)*; Indianapolis Colts (2007); Nashville Kats (2008); Winnipeg Blue Bombers (2009)
- * Offseason or practice squad member only

Coaching
- Del City HS (OK) (2009) Offensive coordinator & quarterbacks coach; Tulsa (2010) Graduate assistant; LSU (2011) Offensive analyst; Carleton (2012) Wide receivers coach; Carleton (2013) Offensive coordinator & quarterbacks coach; St. Thomas (MN) (2014) Wide receivers coach; St. Thomas (MN) (2015–2016) Offensive coordinator & quarterbacks coach; St. Olaf (2017–present) Head coach

Head coaching record
- Career: 41–46 (.471)

See also, James Rhyne Killian, 10th president of MIT.

James Kilian (born October 24, 1980) is an American college football coach and former professional quarterback. He is the head football coach for St. Olaf College, a position he has held since 2017. Kilian played football and basketball at Medford High School in Medford, Oklahoma, making him one of the few 8-man or 6-man athletes to be drafted to the NFL in recent years. He played college football for the Tulsa Golden Hurricane and started at quarterback for the 2001 and 2002 seasons. He placed himself for draft eligibility as a junior. Kilian was selected in the seventh round of the 2005 NFL draft by the Kansas City Chiefs.

Kilian was also a member of the Atlanta Falcons, Indianapolis Colts, Nashville Kats and Winnipeg Blue Bombers. Previously, he coached at the University of St. Thomas, University of Tulsa, and Louisiana State University.

== Head coaching record ==
Year	Team	Overall	Conference	Standing	Bowl/playoffs
St. Olaf Oles (Minnesota Intercollegiate Athletic Conference) (2017–present)
2017	St. Olaf	4–6	3–5	6th	
2018	St. Olaf	5–5	3–5	6th	
2019	St. Olaf	5–5	3–5	6th	
2020–21	No team—COVID-19				
2021	St. Olaf	5–5	4–4	3rd (Northwoods)	
2022	St. Olaf	4–6	3–5	4th (Northwoods)	
2023	St. Olaf	5–5	3–4	4th (Northwoods)	
2024	St. Olaf	7–3	5–3	T–2nd (Northwoods)	
2025	St. Olaf	4–6	3–6	7th	
2026	St. Olaf	2–5	2–4		
St. Olaf:		41–46	29–41		
Total:		41–46			
