= Terral, Oklahoma =

- Town
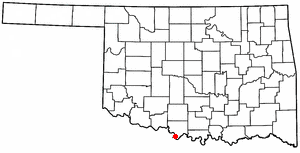
- Location of Terral, Oklahoma
- Coordinates: 33°53′46″N 97°56′15″W
- Country: United States
- State: Oklahoma
- County: Jefferson
- Post office: 1892

Government
  - Mayor: Megan Rainey

Area
  - Total: 0.42 sq mi (1.10 km^{2})
  - Land: 0.42 sq mi (1.10 km^{2})
  - Water: 0 sq mi (0.00 km^{2}) 0.0%
- Elevation: 846 ft (258 m)

Population (2020)
  - Total: 280
  - Density: 657.5/sq mi (253.88/km^{2})
- Time zone: UTC-6 (CST)
  - Summer (DST): UTC-5 (CDT)
- ZIP codes: 73561, 73569
- Area code: 580
- FIPS code: 40-72900
- GNIS feature ID: 2413376

Terral is an agricultural town in Jefferson County, Oklahoma, United States. As of the 2020 census, Terral had a population of 280.

== History ==
Terral was founded in 1892 by John Heidelberg Dace Terral, a Texan who leased the land from a Chickasaw woman, Emily Colbert Fleetwood, He and Hugh Schoolfield platted the townsite and began selling lots in May 1892. A post office was established August 8, 1892, with Terral himself serving as the first postmaster.

The town has remained an agricultural community since its establishment. The most important crops are watermelons, cantaloupes and cotton. Cattle and hog raising are also important. Livestock are usually sold in Fort Worth, Texas, 90 miles (140 km) to the south of Terral. The town began celebrating an annual Terral Watermelon Jubilee in July 1965.

== Geography ==
Terral is located in southern Jefferson County at 33°53′46″N 97°56′15″W (33.896235, -97.937538), along U.S. Route 81. It is 20 miles (32 km) south of Waurika, the county seat, and 1 mile (1.6 km) north of the Red River, the Oklahoma–Texas border.

According to the United States Census Bureau, the town has a total area of 0.42 square miles (1.1 km^{2}), all land.

== Highways ==
- US 81

== Demographics ==
Historical population
| Census | Pop. | Note | %± |
|---|---|---|---|
| 1910 | 573 | | — |
| 1920 | 506 | | −11.7% |
| 1930 | 593 | | 17.2% |
| 1940 | 521 | | −12.1% |
| 1950 | 616 | | 18.2% |
| 1960 | 585 | | −5.0% |
| 1970 | 636 | | 8.7% |
| 1980 | 604 | | −5.0% |
| 1990 | 469 | | −22.4% |
| 2000 | 386 | | −17.7% |
| 2010 | 382 | | −1.0% |
| 2020 | 280 | | −26.7% |
U.S. Decennial Census

=== 2020 census ===
As of the 2020 census, Terral had a population of 280. The median age was 54.3 years. 16.4% of residents were under the age of 18 and 31.8% of residents were 65 years of age or older. For every 100 females there were 83.0 males, and for every 100 females age 18 and over there were 85.7 males age 18 and over.

0.0% of residents lived in urban areas, while 100.0% lived in rural areas.

There were 142 households in Terral, of which 28.2% had children under the age of 18 living in them. Of all households, 40.8% were married-couple households, 14.8% were households with a male householder and no spouse or partner present, and 37.3% were households with a female householder and no spouse or partner present. About 35.3% of all households were made up of individuals and 14.1% had someone living alone who was 65 years of age or older.

There were 174 housing units, of which 18.4% were vacant. The homeowner vacancy rate was 0.0% and the rental vacancy rate was 0.0%.

Racial composition as of the 2020 census
| Race | Number | Percent |
|---|---|---|
| White | 210 | 75.0% |
| Black or African American | 0 | 0.0% |
| American Indian and Alaska Native | 6 | 2.1% |
| Asian | 1 | 0.4% |
| Native Hawaiian and Other Pacific Islander | 1 | 0.4% |
| Some other race | 28 | 10.0% |
| Two or more races | 34 | 12.1% |
| Hispanic or Latino (of any race) | 57 | 20.4% |

=== 2000 census ===
As of the census of 2000, there were 386 people, 173 households, and 102 families residing in the town. The population density was 923.3 inhabitants per square mile (356.5/km^{2}). There were 226 housing units at an average density of 540.6 per square mile (208.7/km^{2}). The racial makeup of the town was 89.90% White, 2.85% Native American, 3.89% from other races, and 3.37% from two or more races. Hispanic or Latino of any race were 16.32% of the population.

There were 173 households, out of which 28.9% had children under the age of 18 living with them, 48.6% were married couples living together, 7.5% had a female householder with no husband present, and 40.5% were non-families. 38.7% of all households were made up of individuals, and 19.7% had someone living alone who was 65 years of age or older. The average household size was 2.23 and the average family size was 2.97.

In the town, the population was spread out, with 25.9% under the age of 18, 8.3% from 18 to 24, 21.2% from 25 to 44, 21.5% from 45 to 64, and 23.1% who were 65 years of age or older. The median age was 40 years. For every 100 females, there were 90.1 males. For every 100 females age 18 and over, there were 90.7 males.

The median income for a household in the town was $15,972, and the median income for a family was $21,563. Males had a median income of $20,893 versus $18,750 for females. The per capita income for the town was $9,486. About 24.5% of families and 27.7% of the population were below the poverty line, including 40.4% of those under age 18 and 26.6% of those age 65 or over.
