= Adrian Wiggins =

American basketball coach (born 1973)

Current position
- Title: Head coach
- Team: Clovis East HS

Biographical details
- Born: October 15, 1973 (age 53); Lawton, Oklahoma, U.S.

Playing career

Baseball
- 1992–1995: Cameron
- Position: Pitcher/outfielder

Coaching career (HC unless noted)

Basketball
- 1996–1997: Lawton HS (boys' asst.)
- 1997–1999: Lawton HS (boys')
- 1999–2000: Cameron (women's asst.)
- 2000–2002: Cameron (women's)
- 2002–2005: Fresno State (women's asst.)
- 2005–2012: Fresno State (women's)
- 2013–present: Clovis East HS (boys')

Head coaching record
- Overall: 215–83 (college); 53–33 (high school)
- Tournaments: 0–5 (NCAA D-I); 2–2 (WNIT); 0–1 (NCAA D-II)

Adrian Michael Wiggins (born October 15, 1973) is an American basketball coach who is currently head boys' basketball coach at Clovis East High School. Prior to that, he was the head women's basketball coach at Fresno State.

== Early life and education ==
Born and raised in Lawton, Oklahoma, Wiggins graduated from MacArthur High School in 1991. At MacArthur, Wiggins was an all-state pitcher on the baseball team in addition to playing basketball.

After high school, Wiggins attended Cameron University, a Division II school in Lawton, and played on the baseball team for four years at pitcher and outfielder. As a senior in 1995, Wiggins had a 4–4 record with a 4.84 ERA and 35 strikeouts in 14 pitching appearances with 12 starts. He also had a .265 batting average with eight home runs, eight doubles, and 33 RBI in 49 games. Wiggins graduated from Cameron in 1995 with a bachelor's degree in psychology.

== Coaching career ==
=== YMCA and Lawton High ===
From 1992 to 1996, Wiggins helped organize a midnight basketball league at the Lawton YMCA, in addition to being a camp counselor. In 1996, he was a boys' varsity basketball assistant coach at Lawton High School, then was promoted to head coach a year later and stayed for two years.

=== Cameron ===
In 1999, Wiggins returned to Cameron to be a women's basketball assistant coach, before being promoted to head coach on May 31, 2000. In the 2001–02 season, he led Cameron to a 25–5 record, the Lone Star Conference North Division title, and first-ever NCAA Division II Tournament appearance.

=== Fresno State ===
Wiggins moved up to the Division I level in 2002 as an assistant coach at Fresno State, first under Britt King in 2002–03 and Stacy Johnson-Klein in the next season. On February 9, 2005, Wiggins became interim head coach while Johnson-Klein was suspended and subsequently fired. Wiggins had a 7–4 record in his time as interim head coach at the end of the 2004–05 season, including an appearance in the WNIT. Wiggins continued to be interim head coach during the 2005–06 season as Fresno State conducted a national search for a long-term head coach. After completing a historically best 24–8 season and second straight WNIT appearance, Wiggins was promoted to the head coaching position long term on April 7, 2006. In the subsequent seasons, Wiggins led the team to six straight winning seasons, including five straight NCAA Tournament appearances from 2008 to 2012.

=== Ole Miss ===
On March 26, 2012, Wiggins was hired at the University of Mississippi (Ole Miss). However, on October 20, prior to the season, the university placed Wiggins on administrative leave and fired two of his assistant coaches due to NCAA violations, namely improper academic and recruiting conduct. Two days later, Mississippi fired Wiggins.

=== Clovis East High School ===
In January 2013, Wiggins was hired at Clovis East High School as boys' varsity basketball head coach, effective in the following school year. In his first three seasons, Wiggins went 53–33 at Clovis East.

== Head coaching record ==
Record table
Season	Team	Overall	Conference	Standing	Postseason
Cameron Aggies (Lone Star Conference) (2000–2002)
2000–01	Cameron	15–12	7–5	T–3rd (North)	
2001–02	Cameron	25–5	10–2	1st (North)	NCAA Division II First Round
Cameron:		40–17	17–7		
Fresno State Bulldogs (Western Athletic Conference) (2005–2012)
2004–05	Fresno State	7–4	7–2	T–4th*	WNIT First Round
2005–06	Fresno State	24–8	14–2	2nd	WNIT Third Round
2006–07	Fresno State	18–13	10–6	T–3rd	
2007–08	Fresno State	22–11	14–2	T–1st	NCAA First Round
2008–09	Fresno State	24–9	12–4	T–1st	NCAA First Round
2009–10	Fresno State	27–7	16–0	1st	NCAA First Round
2010–11	Fresno State	25–8	14–2	2nd	NCAA First Round
2011–12	Fresno State	28–6	13–1	1st	NCAA First Round
Fresno State:		175–66	100–19		
Total:		215–83			
National champion Postseason invitational champion Conference regular season champion Conference regular season and conference tournament champion Division regular season champion Division regular season and conference tournament champion Conference tournament champion

*Wiggins took over as interim head coach on February 9, 2005, after the suspension of Stacy Johnson-Klein. Their cumulative record for the season was 20–11 (10–8 WAC).
