= Renfrow, Oklahoma =

- Town
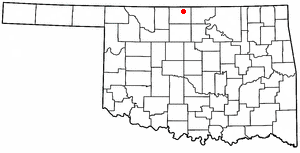
- Location of Renfrow, Oklahoma
- Coordinates: 36°55′29″N 97°39′25″W
- Country: United States
- State: Oklahoma
- County: Grant

Area
  - Total: 0.097 sq mi (0.25 km^{2})
  - Land: 0.097 sq mi (0.25 km^{2})
  - Water: 0 sq mi (0.00 km^{2})
- Elevation: 1,211 ft (369 m)

Population (2020)
  - Total: 15
  - Density: 156.2/sq mi (60.31/km^{2})
- Time zone: UTC-6 (Central (CST))
  - Summer (DST): UTC-5 (CDT)
- FIPS code: 40-62900
- GNIS feature ID: 2412542

Renfrow is a town in Grant County, Oklahoma, United States. The eastern boundary of the town is U.S. Route 81, and Renfrow is located about 9.5 miles along that highway north-northeast of Medford, the county seat. As of the 2020 census, Renfrow had a population of 15.

== Geography ==
According to the United States Census Bureau, the town has a total area of 0.1 square miles (0.26 km^{2}), all land.

== Demographics ==
Historical population
Census	Pop.	Note	%±
1900	129		—
1910	207		60.5%
1920	132		−36.2%
1930	125		−5.3%
1940	115		−8.0%
1950	68		−40.9%
1960	38		−44.1%
1970	39		2.6%
1980	27		−30.8%
1990	19		−29.6%
2000	16		−15.8%
2010	12		−25.0%
2020	15		25.0%
U.S. Decennial Census

=== 2020 census ===
As of the 2020 census, Renfrow had a population of 15. The median age was 56.5 years. 6.7% of residents were under the age of 18 and 40.0% of residents were 65 years of age or older. For every 100 females there were 114.3 males, and for every 100 females age 18 and over there were 100.0 males age 18 and over.

0.0% of residents lived in urban areas, while 100.0% lived in rural areas.

There were 12 households in Renfrow, of which 58.3% had children under the age of 18 living in them. Of all households, 58.3% were married-couple households, 25.0% were households with a male householder and no spouse or partner present, and 8.3% were households with a female householder and no spouse or partner present. About 0.0% of all households were made up of individuals and 0.0% had someone living alone who was 65 years of age or older.

There were 12 housing units, of which 0.0% were vacant. The homeowner vacancy rate was 0.0% and the rental vacancy rate was 0.0%.

Racial composition as of the 2020 census
Race	Number	Percent
White	15	100.0%
Black or African American	0	0.0%
American Indian and Alaska Native	0	0.0%
Asian	0	0.0%
Native Hawaiian and Other Pacific Islander	0	0.0%
Some other race	0	0.0%
Two or more races	0	0.0%
Hispanic or Latino (of any race)	0	0.0%

=== 2000 census ===
As of the 2000 census, there were 16 people, 8 households, and 4 families residing in the town. The population density was 162.9 inhabitants per square mile (62.9/km^{2}). There were 10 housing units at an average density of 101.8 per square mile (39.3/km^{2}). The racial makeup of the town was 100.00% White.

There were 8 households, out of which none had children under the age of 18 living with them, 50.0% were married couples living together, and 50.0% were non-families. 37.5% of all households were made up of individuals, and 12.5% had someone living alone who was 65 years of age or older. The average household size was 2.00 and the average family size was 2.75.

In the town, the population was spread out, with 31.3% from 25 to 44, 37.5% from 45 to 64, and 31.3% who were 65 years of age or older. The median age was 64 years. For every 100 females, there were 100.0 males. For every 100 females age 18 and over, there were 100.0 males.

The median income for a household in the town was $53,750, and the median income for a family was $53,750. Males had a median income of $80,488 versus $11,875 for females. The per capita income for the town was $20,674. None of the population and none of the families were below the poverty line.

== Education ==
The school district is Medford Public Schools.

The community previously had its own elementary school, closed in 1968, and its own secondary school, closed in 1927.
