= Deer Creek, Oklahoma =

- Town
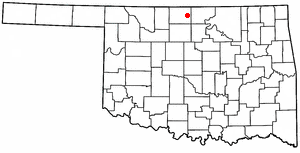
- Location of Deer Creek, Oklahoma
- Coordinates: 36°48′24″N 97°31′10″W
- Country: United States
- State: Oklahoma
- County: Grant

Area
  - Total: 0.14 sq mi (0.37 km^{2})
  - Land: 0.14 sq mi (0.37 km^{2})
  - Water: 0 sq mi (0.00 km^{2})
- Elevation: 1,089 ft (332 m)

Population (2020)
  - Total: 78
  - Density: 547.4/sq mi (211.35/km^{2})
- Time zone: UTC-6 (Central (CST))
  - Summer (DST): UTC-5 (CDT)
- ZIP code: 74636
- Area code: 580
- FIPS code: 40-19650
- GNIS feature ID: 2412414

Deer Creek is an incorporated community in Grant County, Oklahoma, United States. As of the 2020 census, Deer Creek had a population of 78. It is named after a nearby stream, itself a tributary of the Salt Fork of the Arkansas River.

== History ==
The community began on March 14, 1898, when W. A. Bradford, president of the Gulf Railroad, bought 160 acres (0.65 km^{2}) of land to establish a town along the route his railroad planned to use for a rail line between Medford and Blackwell, Oklahoma. The line was constructed between 1897-1898. On February 27, 1899, the post office at the nearby community of Orie was moved to Deer Creek. (Note: Gulf Railroad was later acquired by the Atchison, Topeka and Santa Fe Railway (Santa Fe Railroad).)

The Deer Creek Mennonites organized on August 27, 1899, and opened a church in 1902. Soon, other denominations began meeting in the home of Elijah Franklin Webster, with a Methodist minister leading the service. The Christian and Methodist church buildings were constructed by 1909.

The first producing oil and gas wells in the area were drilled in the early 1920s, causing a brief boom. Deer Creek's population peaked at 312 in 1930. A prolonged population decline reached 124 in 1990. Except for one co-operative, most businesses had closed by 1998. There has been a small population increase in the 21st century.

== Geography ==
Deer Creek is located 12 miles (19 km) east of Medford on Oklahoma State Highway 11. The town's namesake, Deer Creek, runs approximately one mile east of the community.

According to the United States Census Bureau, the town has a total area of 0.1 square miles (0.26 km^{2}), all land.

== Demographics ==
Historical population
Census	Pop.	Note	%±
1910	166		—
1920	218		31.3%
1930	312		43.1%
1940	250		−19.9%
1950	209		−16.4%
1960	215		2.9%
1970	203		−5.6%
1980	174		−14.3%
1990	124		−28.7%
2000	147		18.5%
2010	130		−11.6%
2020	78		−40.0%
U.S. Decennial Census

=== 2020 census ===
As of the 2020 census, Deer Creek had a population of 78. The median age was 37.5 years. 28.2% of residents were under the age of 18 and 19.2% of residents were 65 years of age or older. For every 100 females there were 105.3 males, and for every 100 females age 18 and over there were 124.0 males age 18 and over.

0.0% of residents lived in urban areas, while 100.0% lived in rural areas.

There were 29 households in Deer Creek, of which 34.5% had children under the age of 18 living in them. Of all households, 44.8% were married-couple households, 20.7% were households with a male householder and no spouse or partner present, and 34.5% were households with a female householder and no spouse or partner present. About 31.0% of all households were made up of individuals and 6.8% had someone living alone who was 65 years of age or older.

There were 47 housing units, of which 38.3% were vacant. The homeowner vacancy rate was 0.0% and the rental vacancy rate was 50.0%.

Racial composition as of the 2020 census
Race	Number	Percent
White	65	83.3%
Black or African American	3	3.8%
American Indian and Alaska Native	0	0.0%
Asian	1	1.3%
Native Hawaiian and Other Pacific Islander	0	0.0%
Some other race	5	6.4%
Two or more races	4	5.1%
Hispanic or Latino (of any race)	8	10.3%

=== 2000 census ===
As of the census of 2000, there were 148 people, 57 households, and 40 families residing in the town. The population density was 1,059.4 inhabitants per square mile (409.0/km^{2}). There were 76 housing units at an average density of 547.7 per square mile (211.5/km^{2}). The racial makeup of the town was 86.39% White, 6.80% Native American, 4.76% from other races, and 2.04% from two or more races. Hispanic or Latino of any race were 6.12% of the population.

There were 56 households, out of which 32.1% had children under the age of 18 living with them, 66.1% were married couples living together, 3.6% had a female householder with no husband present, and 26.8% were non-families. 26.8% of all households were made up of individuals, and 16.1% had someone living alone who was 65 years of age or older. The average household size was 2.63 and the average family size was 3.20.

In the town, the population was spread out, with 31.3% under the age of 18, 7.5% from 18 to 24, 22.4% from 25 to 44, 19.7% from 45 to 64, and 19.0% who were 65 years of age or older. The median age was 38 years. For every 100 females, there were 98.6 males. For every 100 females age 18 and over, there were 98.0 males.

The median income for a household in the town was $36,563, and the median income for a family was $40,625. Males had a median income of $33,750 versus $25,625 for females. The per capita income for the town was $15,618. There were 8.9% of families and 14.0% of the population living below the poverty line, including 32.1% of under eighteens and none of those over 64.

== Economy ==
The economy of the community relies largely on nearby wheat farms. According to the Encyclopedia of Oklahoma History and Culture, most businesses in town had closed by 1998, and nearly three quarters of the people who are employed commute elsewhere to work.
