= Short Cut to Red River =

- Cover of the 1958 Macmillan edition
- Author: Noel Loomis
- Language: English
- Publisher: Macmillan
- Publication date: 1958
- LC Class: PZ3.L8733 Sh

Short Cut to Red River is a 1958 western novel by Noel Loomis that won the Spur Award for Best Western Novel.

== Plot summary ==
During an expedition to expand to establish a new trade route, Ross Phillips comes across white women captives that were taken by a Comanche chief. One of the captives had once saved Phillips' life.
