= Wakita, Oklahoma =

- Town
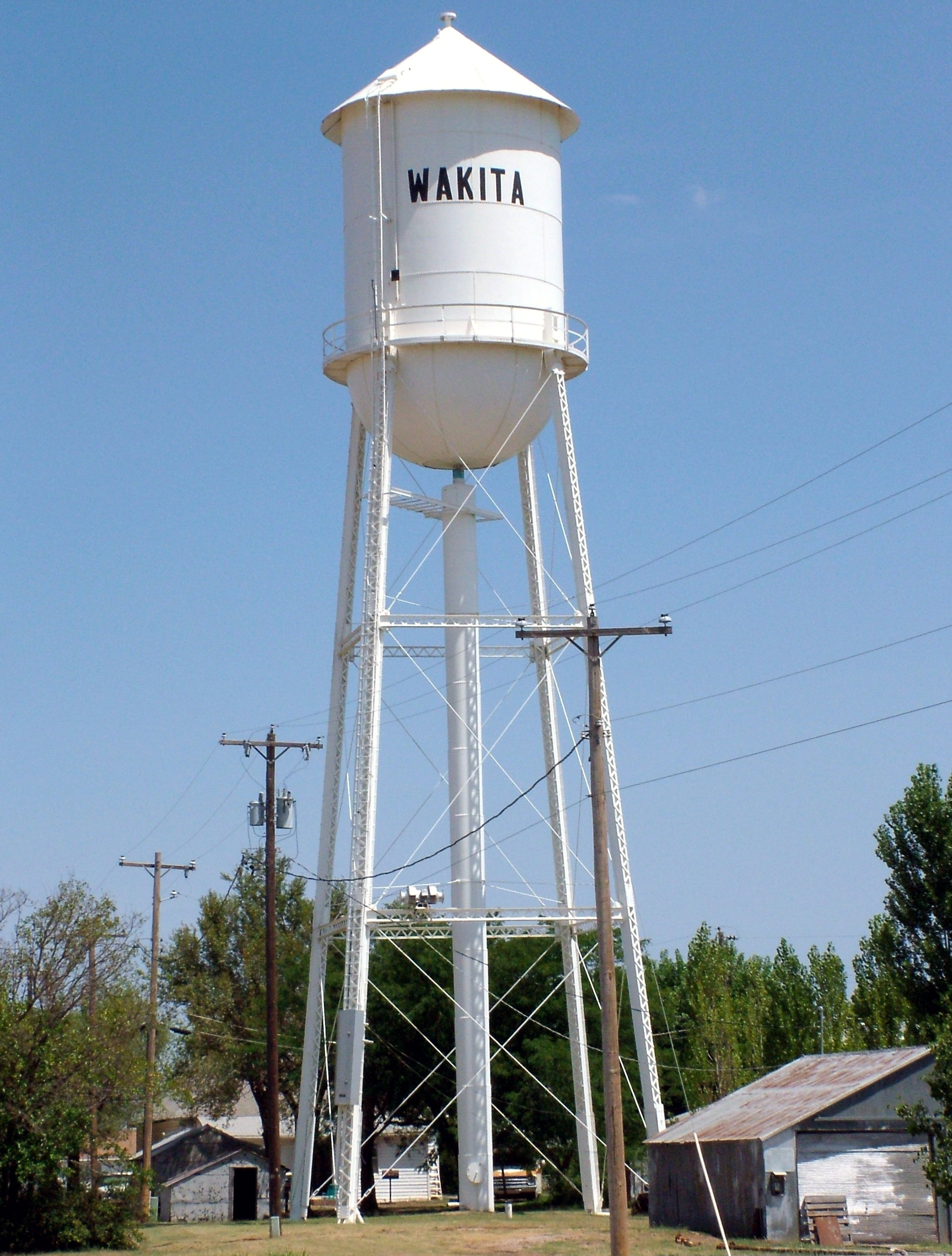
- Wakita's water tower with a tornado siren mounted on it

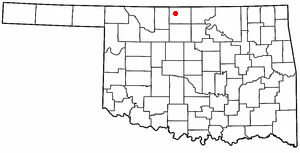
- Location of Wakita, Oklahoma
- Coordinates: 36°52′55″N 97°55′26″W
- Country: United States
- State: Oklahoma
- County: Grant

Area
  - Total: 0.31 sq mi (0.81 km^{2})
  - Land: 0.31 sq mi (0.81 km^{2})
  - Water: 0 sq mi (0.00 km^{2})
- Elevation: 1,178 ft (359 m)

Population (2020)
  - Total: 311
  - Density: 999/sq mi (385.7/km^{2})
- Time zone: UTC-6 (Central (CST))
  - Summer (DST): UTC-5 (CDT)
- ZIP code: 73771
- Area code: 580
- FIPS code: 40-77950
- GNIS feature ID: 2413439

Wakita is a town in Grant County, Oklahoma, United States, approximately 8 miles (13 km) south of the Kansas border. Wakita was founded on September 16, 1893. Its population was 311 at the 2020 census.

== History ==
Before the town's founding in 1893, there was a dispute over the right to name it. The town's postmaster and the owner of the first general store believed it should be named Whiteville. Local Deputy U.S. Marshall Herbert John Green motioned for the town be named after a Cherokee chief of local significance named Wakita (pronounced Wok-ih-taw). It was believed that Green wanted the town to be named after the chief because the chief's tribe supposedly cast a spell on the area around the town to protect it from tornadoes for a hundred years, but this has no evidence of being true. Citing historian George Shirk, the Encyclopedia of Oklahoma History and Culture states that Wakita is a Cherokee word for water collected in a small depression, such as a buffalo wallow. The same source states that Charles N. Gould, the organizer of the Oklahoma Geological Survey and well-traveled petroleum geologist across the state, claimed it was probably a Greek word meaning "to cry" or "to lament".

The town was founded when the Cherokee Outlet was opened to non-Native American settlement on September 16, 1893. A post office opened November 14, 1893. The population grew when the Hutchinson and Southern Railroad (later the Atchison, Topeka and Santa Fe Railway), built a line through the area in 1897. The trackage has since been abandoned. At statehood in 1907, Wakita had 388 residents; by 1910, it had grown to 405.

Wakita was selected as a filming location for the Hollywood blockbuster Twister (1996). In the film, the town is referred to by name, and the water tower bearing its name is shown.

On May 10, 2010, numerous tornadoes touched down in Grant County, causing significant damage near the Wakita area. However, the town itself was not destroyed or affected.

== Geography ==
Wakita is 12 miles (19 km) northwest of Medford, the county seat, on State Highway 11A.

According to the United States Census Bureau, it has a total area of 0.3 square miles (0.78 km^{2}), all land.

== Demographics ==
Historical population
Census	Pop.	Note	%±
1910	405		—
1920	338		−16.5%
1930	317		−6.2%
1940	444		40.1%
1950	440		−0.9%
1960	452		2.7%
1970	545		20.6%
1980	526		−3.5%
1990	453		−13.9%
2000	420		−7.3%
2010	344		−18.1%
2020	311		−9.6%
U.S. Decennial Census

=== 2020 census ===
As of the 2020 census, Wakita had a population of 311. The median age was 46.1 years. 19.6% of residents were under the age of 18 and 27.7% of residents were 65 years of age or older. For every 100 females there were 78.7 males, and for every 100 females age 18 and over there were 77.3 males age 18 and over.

0.0% of residents lived in urban areas, while 100.0% lived in rural areas.

There were 132 households in Wakita, of which 31.1% had children under the age of 18 living in them. Of all households, 34.8% were married-couple households, 22.7% were households with a male householder and no spouse or partner present, and 31.8% were households with a female householder and no spouse or partner present. About 42.4% of all households were made up of individuals and 23.4% had someone living alone who was 65 years of age or older.

There were 170 housing units, of which 22.4% were vacant. The homeowner vacancy rate was 2.9% and the rental vacancy rate was 9.5%.

Racial composition as of the 2020 census
Race	Number	Percent
White	278	89.4%
Black or African American	4	1.3%
American Indian and Alaska Native	9	2.9%
Asian	0	0.0%
Native Hawaiian and Other Pacific Islander	2	0.6%
Some other race	1	0.3%
Two or more races	17	5.5%
Hispanic or Latino (of any race)	10	3.2%

=== 2010 census ===
As of the census of 2010, there were 344 people, 165 households, and 102 families residing in the town. The population density was 1,275.4 inhabitants per square mile (492.4/km^{2}). There were 205 housing units at an average density of 622.5 per square mile (240.3/km^{2}). The racial makeup of the town was 96.67% White, 0.24% African American, 2.38% Native American, and 0.71% from two or more races. Hispanic or Latino of any race were 0.24% of the population.

There were 165 households, out of which 27.3% had children under the age of 18 living with them, 53.3% were married couples living together, 6.1% had a female householder with no spouse present, and 37.6% were non-families. 32.7% of all households were made up of individuals, and 16.4% had someone living alone who was 65 years of age or older. The average household size was 2.30 and the average family size was 2.94.

In the town, the population was spread out, with 20.0% under the age of 18, 8.1% from 18 to 24, 21.0% from 25 to 44, 21.7% from 45 to 64, and 29.3% who were 65 years of age or older. The median age was 46 years. For every 100 females, there were 85.8 males. For every 100 females age 18 and over, there were 87.7 males.

The median income for a household in the town was $30,096, and the median income for a family was $34,792. Males had a median income of $22,361 versus $21,500 for females. The per capita income for the town was $17,302. About 11.4% of families and 11.9% of the population were below the poverty line, including 12.3% of those under age 18 and 22.2% of those age 65 or over.

== Education ==
The school district is Medford Public Schools.

Students in Wakita went to school at Wakita Public School K-12 through the 2010–2011 school year, after which the school closed due to low enrollment (30 students) and lack of necessary funding. Wakita Schools merged with Medford Public Schools, although many Wakita students also attend Pond Creek-Hunter High School.

== Notable people ==
- Virgil A. Richard, retired brigadier general in the United States Army and gay rights activist
- Cindy Ross, first female president of Cameron University

== Popular culture ==
Wakita was the setting of a 1984 television commercial about DuPont's subsidiary Conoco using seismograph technology to search for oil. It was aired during the 1984 World Series. The voice over starts with, "Nothing much changes in Wakita, Oklahoma."

Wakita was featured in the 1996 blockbuster film Twister starring Helen Hunt and Bill Paxton in which Wakita was destroyed by an F4 tornado that was part of a storm system later spawning an F5 tornado. False fronts were built onto the existing store fronts for some shots and then were removed and replaced with rubble in the streets after the tornadic storm hit and the rest of the building was removed using CGI. Some original buildings were demolished and never replaced, with some of the bricks from the demolished buildings used to construct Twister Park. The Twister Museum, dedicated to movie memorabilia from Twister, opened a few months before the movie was released and remains a town attraction.

In 2021, Jane Remover released their debut album "Frailty", which features a Google Street View screenshot of a house in Wakita as the cover. In 2026, five years after the release of the original album, Remover used a photograph of themselves in front of the same house for the cover art of "Frailty (Deluxe)".

There's also yearly events in Wakita featuring tornado interceptors such as the SRV Dominator and the Tornado Intercept Vehicle, along with many storm chasers and their chasing vehicles.
