= Pond Creek, Oklahoma =

- City
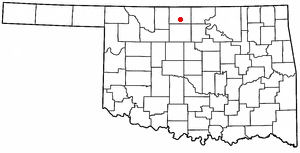
- Location of Pond Creek, Oklahoma
- Coordinates: 36°40′04″N 97°48′09″W
- Country: United States
- State: Oklahoma
- County: Grant

Area
  - Total: 0.85 sq mi (2.20 km^{2})
  - Land: 0.85 sq mi (2.20 km^{2})
  - Water: 0 sq mi (0.00 km^{2})
- Elevation: 1,047 ft (319 m)

Population (2020)
  - Total: 885
  - Density: 1,042.4/sq mi (402.48/km^{2})
- Time zone: UTC-6 (Central (CST))
  - Summer (DST): UTC-5 (CDT)
- ZIP code: 73766
- Area code: 580
- FIPS code: 40-59950
- GNIS feature ID: 2411456
- Website: pondcreekok.com

Pond Creek is a city in Grant County, Oklahoma, United States, along the Salt Fork Arkansas River. As of the 2020 census, Pond Creek had a population of 885.

== History ==
Before people of European descent came on the scene, the region around the present town of Pond Creek was traversed by many of the nomadic Native Americans of the Great Plains. Although the land is now heavily agricultural there are still traces of campsites along the numerous creeks of the drainage of the Salt Fork of the Arkansas River. When many of the Native American groups were moved onto reservations in what is now Oklahoma, towns and trading posts were established. Eventually the present-day Oklahoma was divided into Oklahoma Territory and Indian Territory. The history of Pond Creek and the surrounding area can be easily confused with other streams called Pond Creek (see e.g.). The present community of Pond Creek is located in what is called the Cherokee Strip, more properly known as the Cherokee Outlet. The land at the confluence of Osage Creek and Pond Creek was known as the Pond Creek Stockade on the original Chisholm Trail used by cattle drivers bringing herds of Texas longhorns north to the railroad head first at Abilene, Kansas then later to Wichita and Caldwell. This location is about 4 miles north of the present town of Pond Creek near the present village of Jefferson. Two markers have been placed in this area commemorating the untimely demise of two cowboys. There are two granite markers placed near Pond Creek on the old Chisholm Trail.

In 1887, the Chicago, Kansas and Nebraska Railway built a branch line north–south from Caldwell, Kansas to Pond Creek in 1888. By 1893, it was incrementally built to Fort Worth, Texas. It was foreclosed on in 1891 and taken over by Chicago, Rock Island and Pacific Railway, which shut-down in 1980. The Kansas-Texas mainline was sold to a subsidiary of the Missouri-Kansas-Texas Railroad as the Oklahoma, Kansas and Texas Railroad, merging in 1988 with Missouri Pacific Railroad, which merged in 1997 with Union Pacific Railroad. Most locals still refer to this railroad as the "Rock Island."

Pond Creek was settled as a town during the Cherokee Strip Land Run in 1893. According to the Chronicles of Oklahoma, "The government townsite of Pond Creek was first entered at 2:10 on the day of the run. By evening, it contained some 8,000 inhabitants, and boasted a good hotel, several restaurants, a dozen law offices, two general stores and six or seven grocery stores." The settlers soon found that there was not enough water to support the new town; the government had dug wells for all of the government townsites, including Pond Creek, but all the water in Pond Creek's well was quickly used up. Soldiers dug a new well but found only salt water. Water from the Salt Fork River was brought to Pond Creek and sold for five cents a cup, but it was not fit for human or animal consumption. Beer became a precious commodity, selling for fifty to seventy-five cents a bottle. Water from stagnant creek pools was given to animals. The area also experienced a violent sand storm and wildfires.

In addition to these tribulations, the citizens of Pond Creek had to do battle with the powerful railroad interests, in this case the "Rock Island Line" or CRI&P railroad, to get a coveted depot. This conflict has been called the Enid-Pond Creek Railroad War. Briefly, the railroad had established a station for Pond Creek and the federal government established a different station about 4 miles south of the railroad town. The railroad refused to stop at the government Pond Creek until a combination of citizen action and congressional action forced them to change. Pond Creek legend has it that the railroad specified a mail stop at Pond Creek so to keep face they merely changed the name of railroad Pond Creek to Jefferson and made government Pond Creek the Pond Creek station. This story doesn't quite correspond with most personal histories of the controversy but it makes a colorful tale.

== Geography ==
Pond Creek is located on the west side of the Salt Fork Arkansas River. The city lies at the intersection of U.S. routes 60 and 81.

According to the United States Census Bureau, the city has a total area of 0.8 square miles (2.1 km^{2}), all land.

== Demographics ==
Historical population
Census	Pop.	Note	%±
1900	822		—
1910	1,113		35.4%
1920	965		−13.3%
1930	857		−11.2%
1940	1,019		18.9%
1950	1,066		4.6%
1960	935		−12.3%
1970	903		−3.4%
1980	949		5.1%
1990	982		3.5%
2000	896		−8.8%
2010	856		−4.5%
2020	885		3.4%
U.S. Decennial Census

=== 2020 census ===
As of the 2020 census, Pond Creek had a population of 885. The median age was 37.4 years, 30.2% of residents were under the age of 18, and 15.3% of residents were 65 years of age or older. For every 100 females there were 93.7 males, and for every 100 females age 18 and over there were 95.6 males age 18 and over.

0% of residents lived in urban areas, while 100.0% lived in rural areas.

There were 338 households in Pond Creek, of which 38.8% had children under the age of 18 living in them. Of all households, 53.0% were married-couple households, 20.1% were households with a male householder and no spouse or partner present, and 24.6% were households with a female householder and no spouse or partner present. About 28.1% of all households were made up of individuals and 12.7% had someone living alone who was 65 years of age or older.

There were 399 housing units, of which 15.3% were vacant. Among occupied housing units, 68.3% were owner-occupied and 31.7% were renter-occupied. The homeowner vacancy rate was 2.4% and the rental vacancy rate was 7.8%.

Racial composition as of the 2020 census
Race	Percent
White	86.0%
Black or African American	1.8%
American Indian and Alaska Native	1.6%
Asian	0%
Native Hawaiian and Other Pacific Islander	0.3%
Some other race	1.6%
Two or more races	8.7%
Hispanic or Latino (of any race)	4.6%

=== 2000 census ===
As of the census of 2000, there were 896 people, 364 households, and 263 families residing in the city. The population density was 1,072.4 inhabitants per square mile (414.1/km^{2}). There were 437 housing units at an average density of 523.1 per square mile (202.0/km^{2}). The racial makeup of the city was 93.53% White, 3.57% Native American, 0.22% Asian, 0.11% Pacific Islander, 0.11% from other races, and 2.46% from two or more races. Hispanic or Latino of any race were 1.00% of the population.

There were 364 households, out of which 32.7% had children under the age of 18 living with them, 60.7% were married couples living together, 8.0% had a female householder with no husband present, and 27.7% were non-families. 25.3% of all households were made up of individuals, and 12.9% had someone living alone who was 65 years of age or older. The average household size was 2.46 and the average family size was 2.94.

In the city, the population was spread out, with 27.3% under the age of 18, 6.9% from 18 to 24, 27.0% from 25 to 44, 22.7% from 45 to 64, and 16.1% who were 65 years of age or older. The median age was 38 years. For every 100 females, there were 90.2 males. For every 100 females age 18 and over, there were 89.8 males.

The median income for a household in the city was $30,515, and the median income for a family was $36,346. Males had a median income of $30,682 versus $19,097 for females. The per capita income for the city was $17,456. About 13.6% of families and 17.3% of the population were below the poverty line, including 27.5% of those under age 18 and 14.3% of those age 65 or over.

== See also ==
- Enid–Pond Creek Railroad War
