= Nash, Oklahoma =

- Town
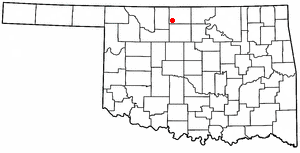
- Location of Nash, Oklahoma
- Coordinates: 36°39′54″N 98°03′07″W
- Country: United States
- State: Oklahoma
- County: Grant

Area
  - Total: 0.33 sq mi (0.86 km^{2})
  - Land: 0.33 sq mi (0.86 km^{2})
  - Water: 0 sq mi (0.00 km^{2})
- Elevation: 1,122 ft (342 m)

Population (2020)
  - Total: 192
  - Density: 579.2/sq mi (223.62/km^{2})
- Time zone: UTC-6 (Central (CST))
  - Summer (DST): UTC-5 (CDT)
- ZIP code: 73761
- Area code: 580
- FIPS code: 40-50300
- GNIS feature ID: 2413033

Nash is a town in Grant County, Oklahoma, United States. As of the 2020 census, Nash had a population of 192.

== Geography ==
According to the United States Census Bureau, the town has a total area of 0.3 square miles (0.78 km^{2}), all land.

== Demographics ==
Historical population
Census	Pop.	Note	%±
1910	348		—
1920	439		26.1%
1930	412		−6.2%
1940	348		−15.5%
1950	290		−16.7%
1960	230		−20.7%
1970	294		27.8%
1980	301		2.4%
1990	281		−6.6%
2000	224		−20.3%
2010	204		−8.9%
2020	192		−5.9%
U.S. Decennial Census

=== 2020 census ===
As of the 2020 census, Nash had a population of 192. The median age was 45.4 years. 24.0% of residents were under the age of 18 and 26.0% of residents were 65 years of age or older. For every 100 females there were 86.4 males, and for every 100 females age 18 and over there were 80.2 males age 18 and over.

0.0% of residents lived in urban areas, while 100.0% lived in rural areas.

There were 87 households in Nash, of which 31.0% had children under the age of 18 living in them. Of all households, 44.8% were married-couple households, 23.0% were households with a male householder and no spouse or partner present, and 26.4% were households with a female householder and no spouse or partner present. About 28.7% of all households were made up of individuals and 16.0% had someone living alone who was 65 years of age or older.

There were 97 housing units, of which 10.3% were vacant. The homeowner vacancy rate was 2.6% and the rental vacancy rate was 0.0%.

Racial composition as of the 2020 census
Race	Number	Percent
White	184	95.8%
Black or African American	0	0.0%
American Indian and Alaska Native	3	1.6%
Asian	0	0.0%
Native Hawaiian and Other Pacific Islander	0	0.0%
Some other race	2	1.0%
Two or more races	3	1.6%
Hispanic or Latino (of any race)	1	0.5%

=== 2000 census ===
As of the census of 2000, there were 224 people, 95 households, and 66 families residing in the town. The population density was 697.3 inhabitants per square mile (269.2/km^{2}). There were 128 housing units at an average density of 398.5 per square mile (153.9/km^{2}). The racial makeup of the town was 95.54% White, 3.12% Native American, 0.89% Asian, and 0.45% from two or more races.

There were 95 households, out of which 31.6% had children under the age of 18 living with them, 64.2% were married couples living together, 5.3% had a female householder with no husband present, and 29.5% were non-families. 28.4% of all households were made up of individuals, and 17.9% had someone living alone who was 65 years of age or older. The average household size was 2.36 and the average family size was 2.90.

In the town, the population was spread out, with 22.8% under the age of 18, 5.8% from 18 to 24, 28.1% from 25 to 44, 23.7% from 45 to 64, and 19.6% who were 65 years of age or older. The median age was 40 years. For every 100 females, there were 82.1 males. For every 100 females age 18 and over, there were 88.0 males.

The median income for a household in the town was $24,063, and the median income for a family was $39,375. Males had a median income of $30,714 versus $16,667 for females. The per capita income for the town was $13,864. None of the families and 3.8% of the population were living below the poverty line, including none of those under the age of 18 and 8.9% of those 65 or older.

== Education ==
Nash once shared a school district with the town of Jet, several miles away along U.S. Route 64, but the school folded in 2013 and high school students now attend schools which comprise part of the Timberlake Regional School District, based in Helena. The elementary school is still located in Jet.
