= Grant County Courthouse (Oklahoma) =

- U.S. National Register of Historic Places
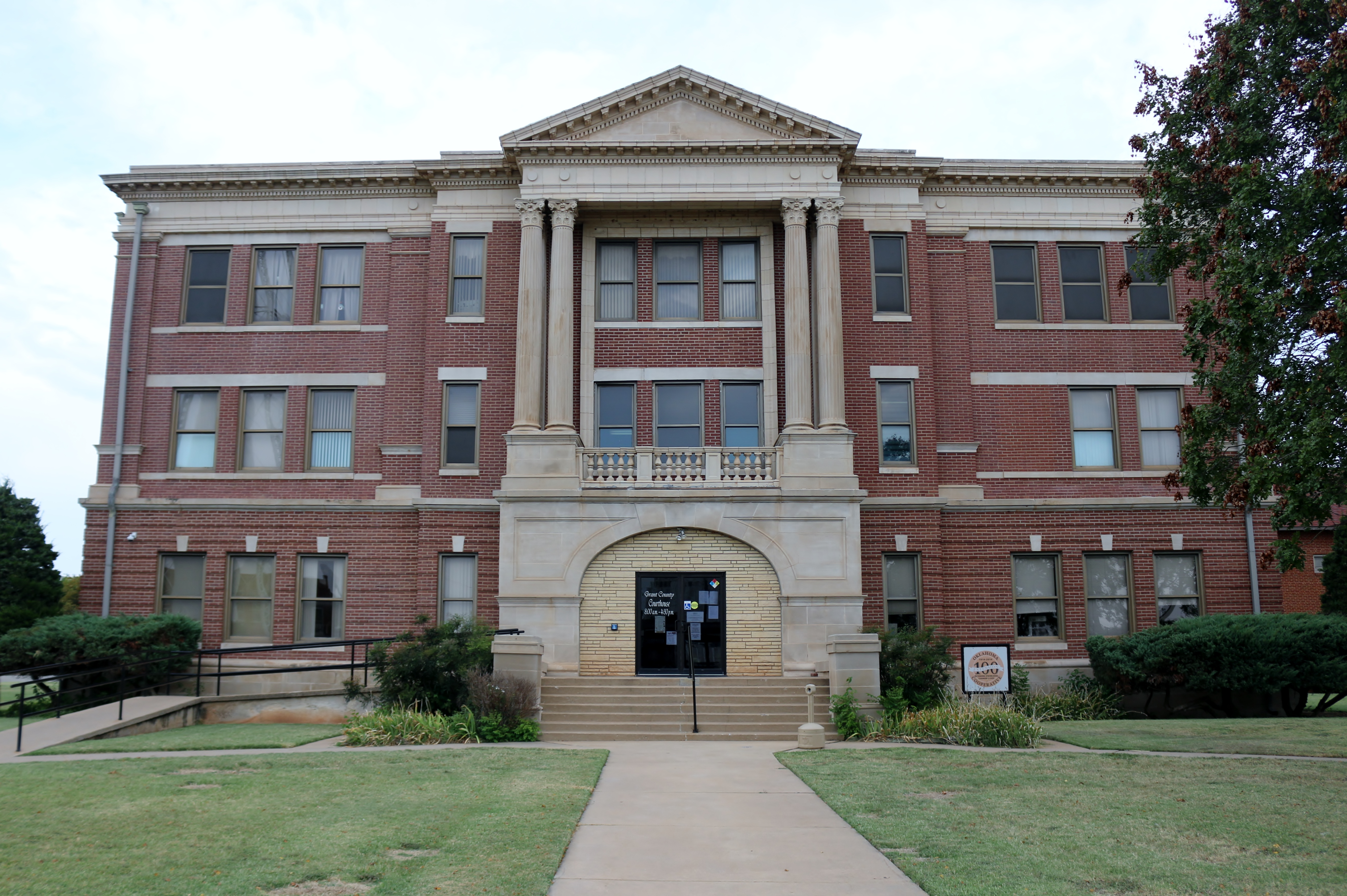

- Location within Oklahoma Location within the United States
- Location: 112 E. Guthrie St., Medford, Oklahoma
- Coordinates: 36°48′31″N 97°44′3″W
- Built: 1909
- Architect: Rowles & Bailey, Albert A. Traver
- Architectural style: Late 19th And 20th Century Revivals, Classical Revival
- MPS: County Courthouses of Oklahoma TR
- NRHP reference No.: 84003027
- Added to NRHP: August 23, 1984

The Grant County Courthouse is an historic 3-story redbrick building located in Medford, Oklahoma. It was built in 1909 in the Classical Revival style. On August 23, 1984, it was added to the National Register of Historic Places.
