= Lamont, Oklahoma =

- Town
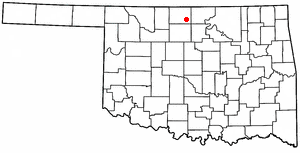
- Location of Lamont, Oklahoma
- Coordinates: 36°41′29″N 97°33′30″W
- Country: United States
- State: Oklahoma
- County: Grant

Area
  - Total: 0.34 sq mi (0.88 km^{2})
  - Land: 0.34 sq mi (0.88 km^{2})
  - Water: 0 sq mi (0.00 km^{2})
- Elevation: 1,011 ft (308 m)

Population (2020)
  - Total: 301
  - Density: 888.7/sq mi (343.14/km^{2})
- Time zone: UTC-6 (Central (CST))
  - Summer (DST): UTC-5 (CDT)
- ZIP code: 74643
- Area code: 580
- FIPS code: 40-41350
- GNIS feature ID: 2412874
- Website: www.townoflamont.com

Lamont is a town in Grant County, Oklahoma, United States, situated along the Salt Fork Arkansas River. As of the 2020 census, Lamont had a population of 301.

== Geography ==
According to the United States Census Bureau, the town has a total area of 0.3 square miles (0.78 km^{2}), all land.

== Demographics ==
Historical population
Census	Pop.	Note	%±
1910	593		—
1920	586		−1.2%
1930	554		−5.5%
1940	577		4.2%
1950	594		2.9%
1960	543		−8.6%
1970	478		−12.0%
1980	571		19.5%
1990	454		−20.5%
2000	465		2.4%
2010	417		−10.3%
2020	301		−27.8%
U.S. Decennial Census

=== 2020 census ===
As of the 2020 census, Lamont had a population of 301. The median age was 38.9 years. 23.3% of residents were under the age of 18 and 16.3% of residents were 65 years of age or older. For every 100 females there were 100.7 males, and for every 100 females age 18 and over there were 89.3 males age 18 and over.

0.0% of residents lived in urban areas, while 100.0% lived in rural areas.

There were 134 households in Lamont, of which 33.6% had children under the age of 18 living in them. Of all households, 44.8% were married-couple households, 24.6% were households with a male householder and no spouse or partner present, and 24.6% were households with a female householder and no spouse or partner present. About 30.6% of all households were made up of individuals and 12.7% had someone living alone who was 65 years of age or older.

There were 185 housing units, of which 27.6% were vacant. The homeowner vacancy rate was 2.1% and the rental vacancy rate was 24.1%.

Racial composition as of the 2020 census
Race	Number	Percent
White	264	87.7%
Black or African American	0	0.0%
American Indian and Alaska Native	11	3.7%
Asian	1	0.3%
Native Hawaiian and Other Pacific Islander	0	0.0%
Some other race	11	3.7%
Two or more races	14	4.7%
Hispanic or Latino (of any race)	22	7.3%

=== 2000 census ===
As of the 2000 census, the median income for a household in the town was $21,917, and the median income for a family was $26,250. Males had a median income of $37,500 versus $14,107 for females. The per capita income for the town was $11,466. About 16.7% of families and 19.4% of the population were below the poverty line, including 30.5% of those under age 18 and 12.3% of those age 65 or over.
