= Jefferson, Oklahoma =

- Town
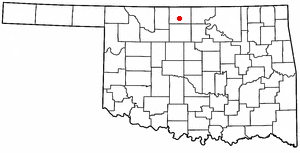
- Location of Jefferson, Oklahoma
- Coordinates: 36°43′13″N 97°47′27″W
- Country: United States
- State: Oklahoma
- County: Grant

Area
  - Total: 0.27 sq mi (0.71 km^{2})
  - Land: 0.27 sq mi (0.71 km^{2})
  - Water: 0 sq mi (0.00 km^{2})
- Elevation: 1,047 ft (319 m)

Population (2020)
  - Total: 9
  - Density: 32.9/sq mi (12.71/km^{2})
- Time zone: UTC-6 (Central (CST))
  - Summer (DST): UTC-5 (CDT)
- FIPS code: 40-37750
- GNIS feature ID: 2412802
- Website: www.ghosttowns.com/states/ok/jeffersoncity.html

Jefferson is a town in Grant County, Oklahoma, United States. The population was nine at the time of the 2020 census, down from twelve in 2010

== History ==
Under its former name of Pond Creek, Jefferson was one of the participating towns in the Enid-Pond Creek Railroad War.

== Geography ==
According to the United States Census Bureau, the town has a total area of 0.3 square miles (0.78 km^{2}), all land.

=== Climate ===
Climate data for Jefferson, Oklahoma
Month	Jan	Feb	Mar	Apr	May	Jun	Jul	Aug	Sep	Oct	Nov	Dec	Year
Mean daily maximum °F (°C)	46 (8)	50 (10)	60 (16)	71 (22)	78 (26)	89 (32)	95 (35)	95 (35)	86 (30)	75 (24)	59 (15)	48 (9)	71 (22)
Mean daily minimum °F (°C)	23 (−5)	26 (−3)	33 (1)	44 (7)	53 (12)	64 (18)	68 (20)	68 (20)	59 (15)	46 (8)	33 (1)	26 (−3)	45 (8)
Average precipitation inches (mm)	0.9 (23)	1.1 (28)	1.9 (48)	2.9 (74)	4.3 (110)	4.1 (100)	3.2 (81)	3.2 (81)	3.2 (81)	2.6 (66)	1.9 (48)	1.2 (30)	30.6 (780)
Source 1: weather.com
Source 2: Weatherbase.com

== Demographics ==
Historical population
Census	Pop.	Note	%±
1900	300		—
1910	281		−6.3%
1920	322		14.6%
1930	269		−16.5%
1940	229		−14.9%
1950	179		−21.8%
1960	119		−33.5%
1970	128		7.6%
1980	92		−28.1%
1990	36		−60.9%
2000	37		2.8%
2010	12		−67.6%
2020	9		−25.0%
U.S. Decennial Census

=== 2020 census ===
As of the 2020 census, Jefferson had a population of 9. The median age was 68.5 years. 0.0% of residents were under the age of 18 and 55.6% of residents were 65 years of age or older. For every 100 females there were 125.0 males, and for every 100 females age 18 and over there were 125.0 males age 18 and over.

0.0% of residents lived in urban areas, while 100.0% lived in rural areas.

There were 7 households in Jefferson, of which 57.1% had children under the age of 18 living in them. Of all households, 71.4% were married-couple households, 0.0% were households with a male householder and no spouse or partner present, and 14.3% were households with a female householder and no spouse or partner present. About 14.3% of all households were made up of individuals and 14.3% had someone living alone who was 65 years of age or older.

There were 8 housing units, of which 12.5% were vacant. The homeowner vacancy rate was 0.0% and the rental vacancy rate was 33.3%.

Racial composition as of the 2020 census
Race	Number	Percent
White	8	88.9%
Black or African American	0	0.0%
American Indian and Alaska Native	0	0.0%
Asian	0	0.0%
Native Hawaiian and Other Pacific Islander	1	11.1%
Some other race	0	0.0%
Two or more races	0	0.0%
Hispanic or Latino (of any race)	0	0.0%

=== 2000 census ===
As of the census of 2000, there were 37 people, 16 households, and 11 families residing in the town. The population density was 136.2 inhabitants per square mile (52.6/km^{2}). There were 25 housing units at an average density of 92.0 per square mile (35.5/km^{2}). The racial makeup of the town was 89.19% White, 2.70% Native American, 8.11% from other races. Hispanic or Latino of any race were 8.11% of the population.

There were 16 households, out of which 31.3% had children under the age of 18 living with them, 56.3% were married couples living together, 12.5% had a female householder with no husband present, and 31.3% were non-families. 31.3% of all households were made up of individuals, and 6.3% had someone living alone who was 65 years of age or older. The average household size was 2.31 and the average family size was 2.91.

In the town, the population was spread out, with 18.9% under the age of 18, 10.8% from 18 to 24, 24.3% from 25 to 44, 29.7% from 45 to 64, and 16.2% who were 65 years of age or older. The median age was 42 years. For every 100 females, there were 131.3 males. For every 100 females age 18 and over, there were 150.0 males.

The median income for a household in the town was $30,000, and the median income for a family was $43,000. Males had a median income of $30,417 versus $28,750 for females. The per capita income for the town was $16,292. There were 20.0% of families and 18.9% of the population living below the poverty line, including no under eighteens and 66.7% of those over 64.

== Education ==
Jefferson is divided between Medford Public Schools and Pond Creek-Hunter Schools.

== See also ==
- Chisholm Trail
