= Salt Fork Arkansas River =

River in Kansas and Oklahoma, U.S.

Salt Fork Arkansas River Grand Saline River, Kicpahaatihariʾ, Little Arkansas River, Nesuketonga River, Red Fork Arkansas River
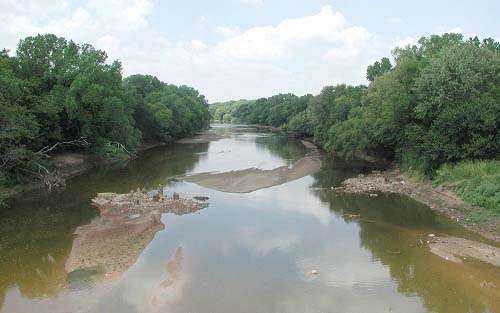
- The Salt Fork at Tonkawa, Oklahoma

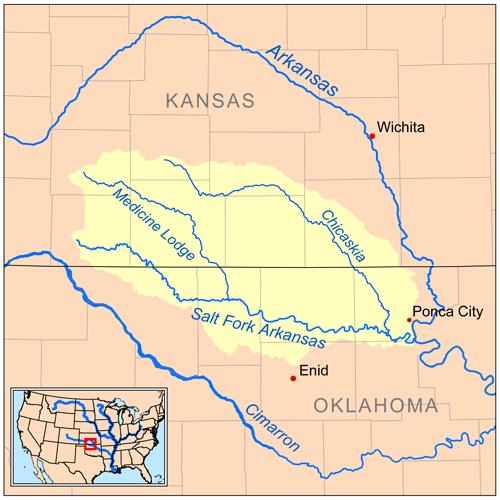
- Map of the Salt Fork Arkansas watershed

Location
- Country: United States
- State: Kansas, Oklahoma
- Cities: Alva, OK, Pond Creek, OK, Lamont, OK, Tonkawa, OK

Physical characteristics
- Source
  - location: Comanche County, Kansas
  - coordinates: 37°10′40″N 99°21′48″W
  - elevation: 2,042 ft (622 m)
- Mouth: Arkansas River
  - location: Kay County, Oklahoma
  - coordinates: 36°35′58″N 97°03′11″W
  - elevation: 896 ft (273 m)
- Length: 239 mi (385 km)
- Discharge
  - location: USGS 07151000 at Tonkawa, OK
  - average: 927 cu ft/s (26.2 m^{3}/s)
  - minimum: 0 cu ft/s (0 m^{3}/s)
  - maximum: 57,800 cu ft/s (1,640 m^{3}/s)

Basin features
- Tributaries
  - left: Medicine Lodge River, Chikaskia River
- Waterbodies: Great Salt Plains Lake
- Watersheds: Salt Fork Arkansas-Arkansas- Mississippi

The Salt Fork of the Arkansas River is a 239-mile-long (385 km) tributary of the Arkansas River in southern Kansas and northern Oklahoma in the United States. Via the Arkansas River, it is part of the watershed of the Mississippi River.

== Course ==
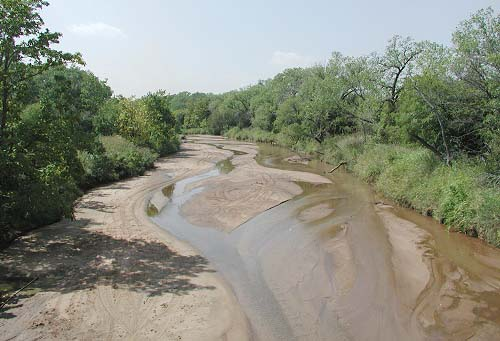
The Salt Fork near Alva, Oklahoma

The Salt Fork rises in Comanche County, Kansas, and flows initially southeastwardly through Barber County, Kansas, and Woods County, Oklahoma, to the town of Alva, where it turns eastwardly for the remainder of its course through Alfalfa, Grant, Kay and Noble counties in Oklahoma, past the towns of Pond Creek, Lamont and Tonkawa. It flows into the Arkansas River in southern Kay County, 7 miles (11 km) south of Ponca City.

In Alfalfa County a dam on the river impounds Great Salt Plains Lake, which is lined with salt flats and is the site of Salt Plains National Wildlife Refuge and a state park.

The Salt Fork's largest tributaries are the Medicine Lodge River, which joins it in Alfalfa County and the Chikaskia River, which joins it in Kay County. Smaller tributaries include Bois d'Arc Creek which meets it in Kay County, and Pond Creek and Sand Creek, which meet it in Grant County.

== Variant names ==
According to the Geographic Names Information System, the Salt Fork Arkansas River has also been known as:

- Grand Sabine River
- Grand Saline River
- Kai it tu
- Kits Kait
- Kiz pahuti hoddi
- Little Arkansas River
- Little River
- Ne Shudse Shunga
- Nesuketonga River
- Red Fork Arkansas River
- Red Fork of Arkansas River
- Salt Fork
- Salt Fork Creek
- Salt Fork of Arkansas River
- Salt Fork of the Arkansas
- Salt Fork of the Arkansas River
- Salt Fork River

== See also ==
- List of Kansas rivers
- List of Oklahoma rivers
