= Cameron University =

Public university in Lawton, Oklahoma, U.S.

- Former names: Cameron State School of Agriculture (1908–1927); Cameron State Agricultural College (1927–1971); Cameron College (1971–1974)
- Type: Public university
- Established: 1908
- Academic affiliations: Space-grant
- President: C. Shane Hunt
- Students: 3,696 (fall 2024)
- Undergraduates: 3,307 (fall 2024)
- Postgraduates: 389 (fall 2024)
- Location: Lawton, Oklahoma, U.S. 34.6087°N 98.4345°W
- Colors: Gold and black
- Nickname: Aggies
- Sporting affiliations: NCAA Division II – Lone Star
- Website: www.cameron.edu

Cameron University is a public university in Lawton, Oklahoma, United States. It offers more than 50 degrees through both undergraduate and graduate programs. The degree programs emphasize the liberal arts, science and technology, and graduate and professional studies. It was founded in 1908, soon after Oklahoma was admitted as a state, as one of six agricultural high schools in the largely rural region.

== History ==
The Oklahoma Legislature created six agricultural high schools in each judicial district in 1908, a year after statehood. Lawton was chosen over Anadarko in April 1909 to receive a high school; the town had already set aside a portion of land to develop a higher educational institution. The University Improvement Association, under the auspices of the Lawton Chamber of Commerce, organized the effort to acquire 220 acres (89 ha) of land two miles (three kilometers) west of the town. Its original goal was to secure a private Baptist college. Arrangements with the Baptists fell through in the summer of 1908. The Catholic Church approached the Association with an offer to found an all-male institution on the site. This plan was rejected by the town leaders, who were predominantly Protestant.

What was known as the Cameron State School of Agriculture was named for Rev. Evan Dhu Cameron, a Baptist minister and Oklahoma's first State Superintendent of Schools. The first classes were held on Statehood Day, November 16, 1909, in the basement of a bank building, while a new campus building was being constructed.

In 1927 Cameron added junior college-level classes to the school's offerings, when local higher education needs exceeded what was available in southwest Oklahoma. With this expansion, the institution was renamed as Cameron State Agricultural College. By 1941, the high school preparatory classes were dropped. Cameron was classified solely as a junior college that year, when the Oklahoma State System of Higher Education was formed and joined the group of institutions governed by the Board of Regents of Oklahoma A&M Colleges.

Based on additional development of programs and curriculum, in 1966 the Legislature passed a bill authorizing the Oklahoma State Regents for Higher Education to allow the college to award Baccalaureate degrees. The institution's name was shortened to Cameron College in 1971 and, with more program expansion, changed to Cameron University in 1974. As the 1970s continued, Cameron demonstrated its dedication to expanded academic offerings through the construction of a fine arts facility designed to serve students in theatre, music, broadcasting, and speech communication.

Dr. Donald J. Owen served as Cameron's president from 1969 to 1980. A Cameron graduate, Owen worked to build academic programs and develop relationships with the Lawton community, as well as the Oklahoma State University system, under which CU fell during his tenure. Cameron's sports teams, particularly football and basketball, excelled during that time. A new President's residence was constructed on Gore Boulevard, west of the campus.

In 1988, State Regents expanded Cameron's functions to include graduate offerings at the master's degree level. This was the first change granted to an Oklahoma institution since Cameron was given the authority to offer bachelor's degrees more than 20 years earlier. In the 1990s, Cameron University came under the Board of Regents of the University of Oklahoma.

Don Davis was President of Cameron University from 1980 to 2002. His father, Clarence L. Davis, was President of Cameron from 1957 to 1960. As a child, Davis lived in the President's house on campus with his parents and sister. As a former legislator from Lawton, Davis was able to secure funding for Cameron that supported it in developing as the premier institute for higher education in southwestern Oklahoma. Also during Davis' tenure, a classical radio station, KCCU 89.3, was founded. Numerous renowned scholars, including Richard Leakey and Cornel West, have spoken at Cameron's annual Academic Festival.

In May 2004, Cameron took over the Duncan Higher Education Center in Duncan, Oklahoma. It was renamed as Cameron University - Duncan.

=== Presidents ===
Since its founding in 1908, Cameron University has had 17 presidents.

- J. A. Liner, 1908–1912
- Ralph K. Robertson, 1912–1913
- E. M. Frost, 1913
- Robert P. Short, 1913–1914
- A. C. Farley, 1914–1920
- A. E. Wickizer, 1920–1923
- John G. March, 1923–1927
- John Coffey, 1927–1931
- Charles M. Conwill, 1931–1946
- Clarence H. Breedlove, 1946–1947
- C. Vernon Howell, 1947–1957
- Clarence L. Davis, 1957–1960
- Richard B. Burch, 1960–1969
- Don J. Owen, 1969–1980
- Don C. Davis, 1980–2002
- Cindy Ross, 2002–2013
- John M. McArthur, 2013–2024
- Jari Askins, 2024--2025
- C. Shane Hunt, 2025-present

== Accreditation ==
Cameron University is accredited by the Higher Learning Commission. The Bachelor of Accounting, Bachelor of Business Administration, and Master of Business Administration degrees offered by the School of Graduate and Professional Studies are accredited by the Accreditation Council for Business Schools and Programs.

== Campus life ==
Undergraduate demographics as of Fall 2023
Race and ethnicity	Total
White	47%
Hispanic	17%
Two or more races	11%
Black	10%
American Indian/Alaska Native	5%
Unknown	4%
International student	3%
Asian	2%
Native Hawaiian/Pacific Islander	1%
Economic diversity
Low-income (Note: The percentage of students who received an income-based federal Pell grant intended for low-income students.)	49%
Affluent (Note: The percentage of students who are a part of the American middle class at the bare minimum.)	51%

Most courses are offered during weekdays and evenings. Cameron uses television, the internet, and a statewide fiber-optics network to deliver classes around the world. Students may participate in independent study, cooperative education, pre-professional studies, teacher certification, and the Army ROTC program. In addition, Cameron offers an honors program, early admission, advanced standing, and college-level examination programs. Some 58% of entering students require remedial work, as their median ACT scores are at the ninth percentile.

A wide range of organizations and interest groups are located on campus, including departmental, minority, professional, political, and religious organizations, and various honorary and recognition societies. Students can also become involved in student government, choral groups, a jazz ensemble, theater, or Greek life.

== Athletics ==
Cameron's athletic teams, known as the Aggies, are a member of Division II of the National Collegiate Athletic Association (NCAA), primarily competing in the Lone Star Conference. Sports offered are men's and women's basketball, baseball, volleyball, softball, spirit team, men's and women's golf, men's and women's tennis, men's and women's cross country, men's and women's track and field.

== Notable alumni ==
- Billy Paultz – Played 15 seasons of professional basketball in the ABA and the NBA. Made 3 ABA All-Star teams, leading the league in blocked shots in 1975–76. Won an ABA championship with the New York Nets in 1973-74
- Hillbilly Jim - Professional wrestler known as "Hillbilly" Jim Morris
- William C. Bilo – United States Army Brigadier General who served as deputy director of the Army National Guard
- John Brandes – National Football League special teams player
- Doug Brown – US Army General and former Commanding General, US Special Operations Command
- Mark Cotney – Tampa Bay Buccaneers defensive back
- Jason Christiansen – Major League Baseball pitcher
- Avery Johnson – Basketball player in NBA and former head coach of the University of Alabama men's basketball team. He formerly coached the Brooklyn Nets and Dallas Mavericks teams of the NBA
- Gary Jones – politician, appointed as Oklahoma State Auditor and Inspector
- Nate Miller – American football player
- Hope C. Rampy - United States Army Major General who serves as Commanding General, U.S. Army Human Resources Command
- Gary M. Rose - Medal of Honor recipient for gallantry during the Vietnam War
- T.W. Shannon – politician and first African-American Speaker of the Oklahoma House of Representatives
- Ray Gene Smith – NFL player
- Charles Washington – NFL and CFL player
- Adrian Wiggins – Former Fresno State women's basketball coach, and former women's basketball program head coach at the University of Mississippi
- Thomas Toth – Canadian runner
