= Grant County, Oklahoma =

County in Oklahoma, United States

- County
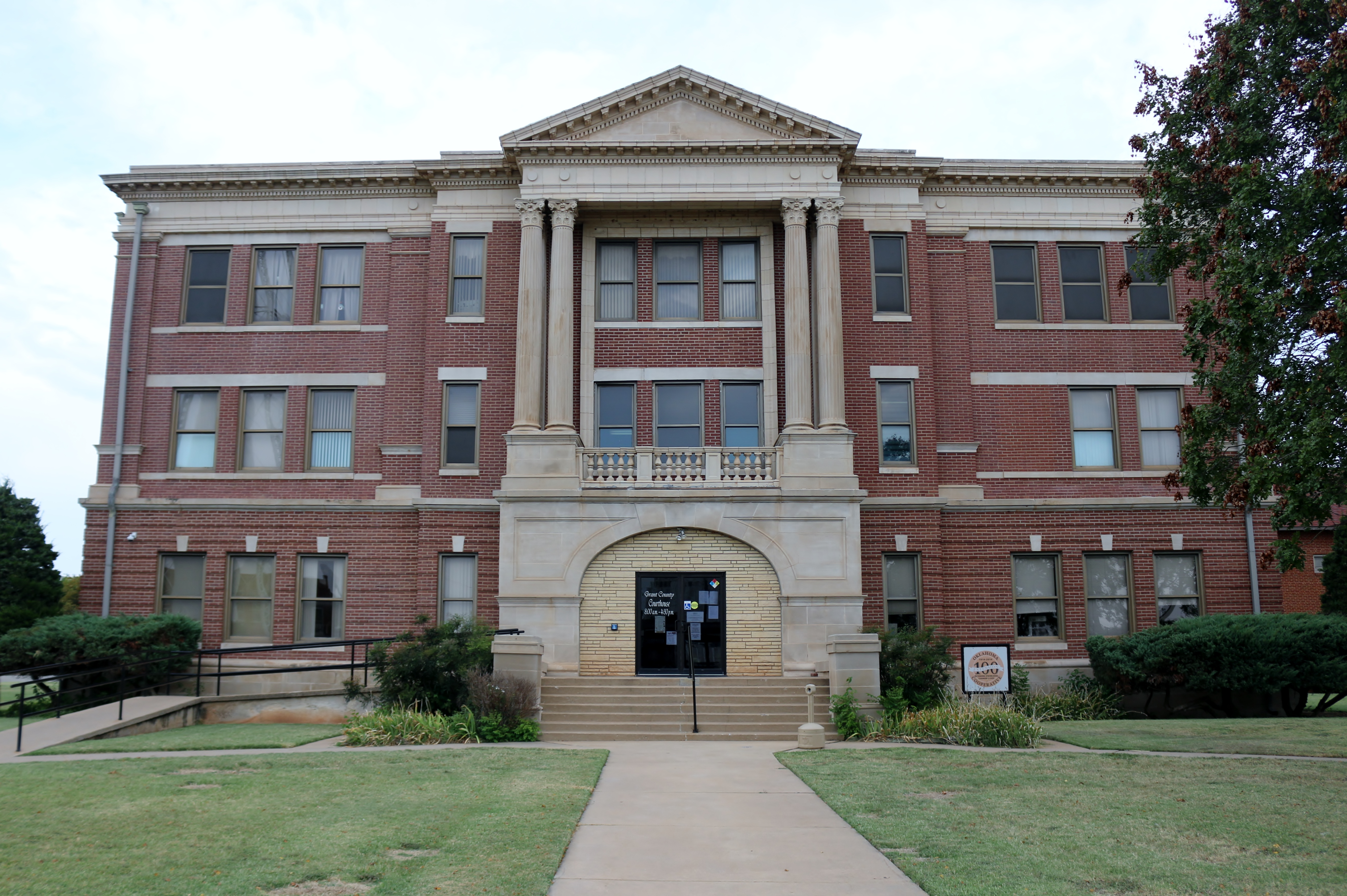
- Grant County Courthouse in Medford (2017)

- Location within the U.S. state of Oklahoma
- Coordinates: 36°48′N 97°47′W
- Country: United States
- State: Oklahoma
- Founded: 1893
- Named for: Ulysses S. Grant
- Seat: Medford
- Largest city: Medford

Area
  - Total: 1,004 sq mi (2,600 km^{2})
  - Land: 1,001 sq mi (2,590 km^{2})
  - Water: 2.7 sq mi (7.0 km^{2}) 0.3%

Population (2020)
  - Estimate (2025): 4,067 ▼
  - Density: 4.2/sq mi (1.6/km^{2})
- Time zone: UTC−6 (Central)
  - Summer (DST): UTC−5 (CDT)
- Congressional district: 3rd

Grant County is a county located on the northern border of the U.S. state of Oklahoma. As of the 2020 census, the population was 4,169. Its county seat is Medford. Originally designated as part of the Cherokee Outlet, it was named County L in Oklahoma Territory at the time of its opening to non-Indian settlement. A county election renamed it for U.S. President Ulysses S. Grant.

== History ==
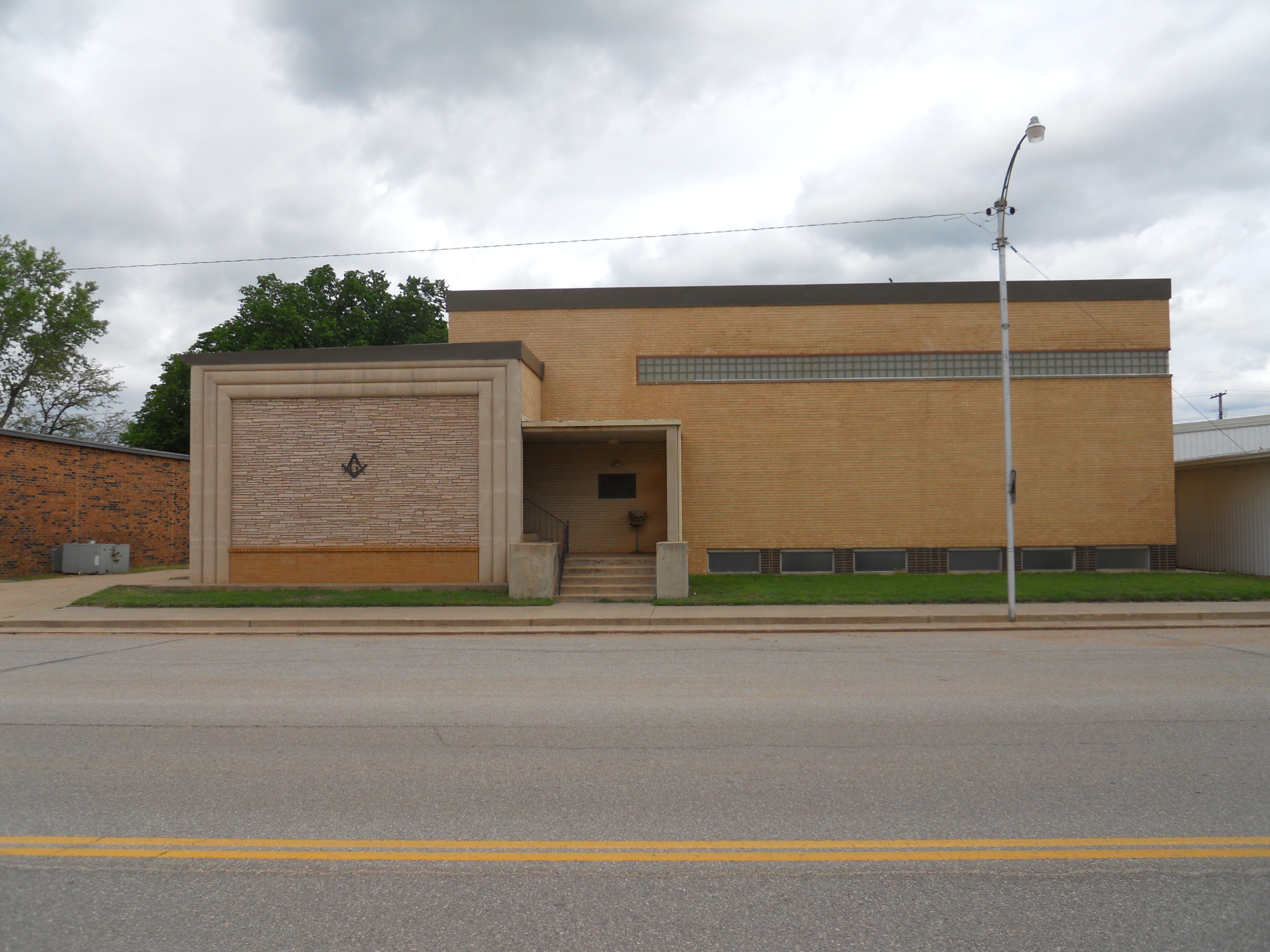
Pond Creek Masonic Lodge No. 125

Grant County was part of the Cherokee Nation's Cherokee Outlet until it was opened to non-Indian settlers in response to public demand on September 16, 1893. Settlers named the county after President Ulysses S. Grant in a general election held November 6, 1894. Congress originally designated this area as County L in Oklahoma Territory, with the county seat at Pond Creek. Medford became the county seat through an election held on May 27, 1908.

The Chicago, Kansas and Nebraska Railway (later the Chicago, Rock Island and Pacific Railway) built a railroad from northern Kansas through Grant County in 1889 and 1890. In 1897, the Gulf Railroad (later the Atchison, Topeka and Santa Fe Railway, AT&SF) linked Manchester, Wakita, Medford, and Deer Creek. At the start of the 20th century, the Blackwell, Enid and Southwestern Railroad (later the St. Louis and San Francisco Railway) passed through Lamont. Still later, the Denver, Enid and Gulf Railroad (later the AT&SF) reached Nash (Nashville).

The railroads gave the county access to markets in the northern and eastern U.S., helping turn the county into a major agriculture and cattle producer. At statehood, the principal crops were wheat, corn, oats, alfalfa, and forage sorghum. The county also had more than fourteen thousand each of hogs and cattle as well as almost thirteen thousand horses.

Bethel was the site of a post office in Grant County that existed from March 12, 1895, until November 2, 1895.

Florence was the site of a post office in Grant Co. that existed prior to 1908 but ceased to exist circa 1920, after the post office closed, per information acquired in researching an ancestor, Isaac Arnold, who was postmaster in Florence from August 1908 to 1920.

In October 2024, four of the sheriff's department deputies resigned at the same time. This left the sheriff's office with one deputy.

== Geography ==
According to the U.S. Census Bureau, the county has a total area of 1,004 square miles (2,600 km^{2}), of which 1,001 square miles (2,590 km^{2}) is land and 2.7 square miles (7.0 km^{2}) (0.3%) is water. Most of the county is drained by the Salt Fork of the Arkansas River and its tributaries (Pond, Deer, Osage, and Crooked creeks). The Chikaskia River flows southeast from Kansas into the county's northeastern corner, then crosses east into Kay County.

The county is by the U.S. state of Kansas on the north, specifically Sumner and Harper counties. Adjacent counties in Oklahoma are Kay County to the east, Garfield County to the south, and Alfalfa County to the west.

=== Major highways ===
- U.S. Route 60
- U.S. Route 64
- U.S. Route 81
- State Highway 11
- State Highway 11A
- State Highway 74
- State Highway 132

=== Adjacent counties ===
- Alfalfa County (west)
- Garfield County (south)
- Harper County, Kansas (northwest)
- Kay County (east)
- Noble County (southeast)
- Sumner County, Kansas (northeast)

== Demographics ==
Historical population
| Census | Pop. | Note | %± |
|---|---|---|---|
| 1900 | 17,373 | | — |
| 1910 | 18,760 | | 8.0% |
| 1920 | 16,072 | | −14.3% |
| 1930 | 14,150 | | −12.0% |
| 1940 | 13,128 | | −7.2% |
| 1950 | 10,461 | | −20.3% |
| 1960 | 8,140 | | −22.2% |
| 1970 | 7,117 | | −12.6% |
| 1980 | 6,518 | | −8.4% |
| 1990 | 5,684 | | −12.8% |
| 2000 | 5,144 | | −9.5% |
| 2010 | 4,527 | | −12.0% |
| 2020 | 4,169 | | −7.9% |
| 2025 (est.) | 4,067 | ▼ | −2.4% |
U.S. Decennial Census; 1790-1960 1900-1990; 1990-2000 2010

=== 2020 census ===
As of the 2020 United States census, the county had a population of 4,169. Of the residents, 23.5% were under the age of 18 and 22.6% were 65 years of age or older; the median age was 44.4 years. For every 100 females there were 100.3 males, and for every 100 females age 18 and over there were 98.8 males.

The racial makeup of the county was 88.8% White, 1.1% Black or African American, 1.9% American Indian and Alaska Native, 0.3% Asian, 1.8% from some other race, and 6.0% from two or more races. Hispanic or Latino residents of any race comprised 4.4% of the population.

There were 1,762 households in the county, of which 30.8% had children under the age of 18 living with them and 22.8% had a female householder with no spouse or partner present. About 31.1% of all households were made up of individuals and 15.7% had someone living alone who was 65 years of age or older.

There were 2,160 housing units, of which 18.4% were vacant. Among occupied housing units, 76.6% were owner-occupied and 23.4% were renter-occupied. The homeowner vacancy rate was 2.4% and the rental vacancy rate was 10.8%.

=== 2010 census ===
As of the 2010 census, the county's population was 4,527, a 12 percent decline from 5,144 at the 2000 census. The population density was 4.5 people per square mile (1.7 people/km^{2}). There were 2,622 housing units at an average density of 3 units per square mile (1.2/km^{2}). More than 90 percent of residents self-identified as white. Less than 3 percent of residents self-identified as Native American and less than 2 percent self-identified as Hispanic or Latino of any race. Less than 1 percent of the population self-identified as Black or African American, Asian, or Pacific Islander. Less than 2 percent of the population self-identified as of a race not listed or as from two or more races.

=== 2000 census ===
There were 2,089 households, out of which 30.7% had children under the age of 18 living with them, 60.4% were married couples living together, 6.3% had a female householder with no husband present, and 30.30% were non-families. 28.40% of households were made up of individuals, and 15.8% had someone living alone who was 65 years of age or older. The average household size was 2.42 and the average family size was 2.95.

In the county, the population was spread out, with 25.2% under the age of 18, 6.50% from 18 to 24, 24.10% from 25 to 44, 22.80% from 45 to 64, and 21.40% who were 65 years of age or older. The median age was 41 years. For every 100 females there were 94.40 males. For every 100 females age 18 and over, there were 94.80 males.

The median income for a household in the county was $28,977, and the median income for a family was $35,833. Males had a median income of $26,837 versus $19,036 for females. The per capita income for the county was $15,709. About 10.50% of families and 13.70% of the population were below the poverty line, including 19.60% of those under age 18 and 11.90% of those age 65 or over.

== Politics ==
Voter Registration and Party Enrollment as of June 30, 2023
| Party | Number of Voters | Percentage |
|---|---|---|
| Democratic | 416 | 14.59% |
| Republican | 2,120 | 74.36% |
| Others | 315 | 11.05% |
| Total | 2,851 | 100% |

=== Political culture ===
United States presidential election results for Grant County, Oklahoma
| Year | Republican | | Democratic | | Third party(ies) | |
| Year | No. | % | No. | % | No. | % |
|---|---|---|---|---|---|---|
| 1908 | 1,796 | 47.50% | 1,866 | 49.35% | 119 | 3.15% |
| 1912 | 1,729 | 47.23% | 1,559 | 42.58% | 373 | 10.19% |
| 1916 | 1,517 | 42.32% | 1,700 | 47.42% | 368 | 10.26% |
| 1920 | 3,210 | 60.58% | 1,883 | 35.54% | 206 | 3.89% |
| 1924 | 2,800 | 51.74% | 1,990 | 36.77% | 622 | 11.49% |
| 1928 | 4,371 | 74.30% | 1,449 | 24.63% | 63 | 1.07% |
| 1932 | 1,902 | 30.03% | 4,432 | 69.97% | 0 | 0.00% |
| 1936 | 2,307 | 36.65% | 3,955 | 62.84% | 32 | 0.51% |
| 1940 | 3,394 | 53.01% | 2,970 | 46.39% | 38 | 0.59% |
| 1944 | 3,021 | 59.48% | 2,045 | 40.26% | 13 | 0.26% |
| 1948 | 2,471 | 53.75% | 2,126 | 46.25% | 0 | 0.00% |
| 1952 | 3,996 | 72.43% | 1,521 | 27.57% | 0 | 0.00% |
| 1956 | 2,788 | 58.81% | 1,953 | 41.19% | 0 | 0.00% |
| 1960 | 2,810 | 61.99% | 1,723 | 38.01% | 0 | 0.00% |
| 1964 | 1,992 | 48.44% | 2,120 | 51.56% | 0 | 0.00% |
| 1968 | 2,403 | 61.82% | 1,047 | 26.94% | 437 | 11.24% |
| 1972 | 2,829 | 75.34% | 805 | 21.44% | 121 | 3.22% |
| 1976 | 1,685 | 46.96% | 1,853 | 51.64% | 50 | 1.39% |
| 1980 | 2,411 | 69.44% | 927 | 26.70% | 134 | 3.86% |
| 1984 | 2,470 | 74.31% | 825 | 24.82% | 29 | 0.87% |
| 1988 | 1,690 | 56.71% | 1,249 | 41.91% | 41 | 1.38% |
| 1992 | 1,311 | 42.90% | 864 | 28.27% | 881 | 28.83% |
| 1996 | 1,382 | 52.09% | 867 | 32.68% | 404 | 15.23% |
| 2000 | 1,762 | 70.40% | 709 | 28.33% | 32 | 1.28% |
| 2004 | 1,950 | 77.35% | 571 | 22.65% | 0 | 0.00% |
| 2008 | 1,836 | 78.13% | 514 | 21.87% | 0 | 0.00% |
| 2012 | 1,675 | 81.00% | 393 | 19.00% | 0 | 0.00% |
| 2016 | 1,827 | 83.01% | 288 | 13.08% | 86 | 3.91% |
| 2020 | 1,916 | 86.07% | 280 | 12.58% | 30 | 1.35% |
| 2024 | 1,794 | 84.42% | 295 | 13.88% | 36 | 1.69% |

== Economy ==
The county economy has largely been based on agriculture since before statehood. At statehood the principal crops included wheat, corn, oats, alfalfa, and forage sorghum with estimated value of $3.5 million. Farmers and ranchers had more than fourteen thousand each of hogs and cattle as well as almost thirteen thousand horses.

Oil and gas were discovered In the early 1920s in the eastern part of the county near the Blackwell Field. On April 24, 1921, the first oil well in Grant County, was drilled near Deer Creek.

== Government and infrastructure ==
Circa early October 2024, the Grant County Sheriff's Department had four deputies.

== Communities ==
| Rank | City/Town/ | Municipal type | Population (2020 Census) |
|---|---|---|---|
| 1 | † Medford | City | 936 |
| 2 | Pond Creek | City | 852 |
| 3 | Lamont | Town | 392 |
| 4 | Wakita | Town | 329 |
| 5 | Nash | Town | 197 |
| 6 | Deer Creek | Town | 125 |
| 7 | Manchester | Town | 99 |
| 8 | Renfrow | Town | 12 |
| 9 | Jefferson | Town | 8 |

=== Cities ===
- Medford
- Pond Creek

=== Towns ===
- Deer Creek
- Jefferson
- Lamont
- Manchester
- Nash
- Renfrow
- Wakita

=== Unincorporated communities ===
- Clyde
- Sand Creek
- Gibbon

== Education ==
School districts include:

- Billings Public Schools
- Deer Creek-Lamont Schools
- Kremlin-Hillsdale Schools
- Medford Public Schools
- Pond Creek-Hunter Schools
- Timberlake Public Schools

Former school districts:

- Wakita Public Schools - Merged into Medford Public Schools in 2011.

== NRHP sites ==
The following sites in Grant County are listed on the National Register of Historic Places:

- Bank of Nashville, Nash
- Dayton School, Lamont
- Deer Creek General Merchandise Store, Deer Creek
- Grant County Courthouse, Medford
- Medford Bathhouse and Swimming Pool, Medford
