= Medford, Oklahoma =

- City
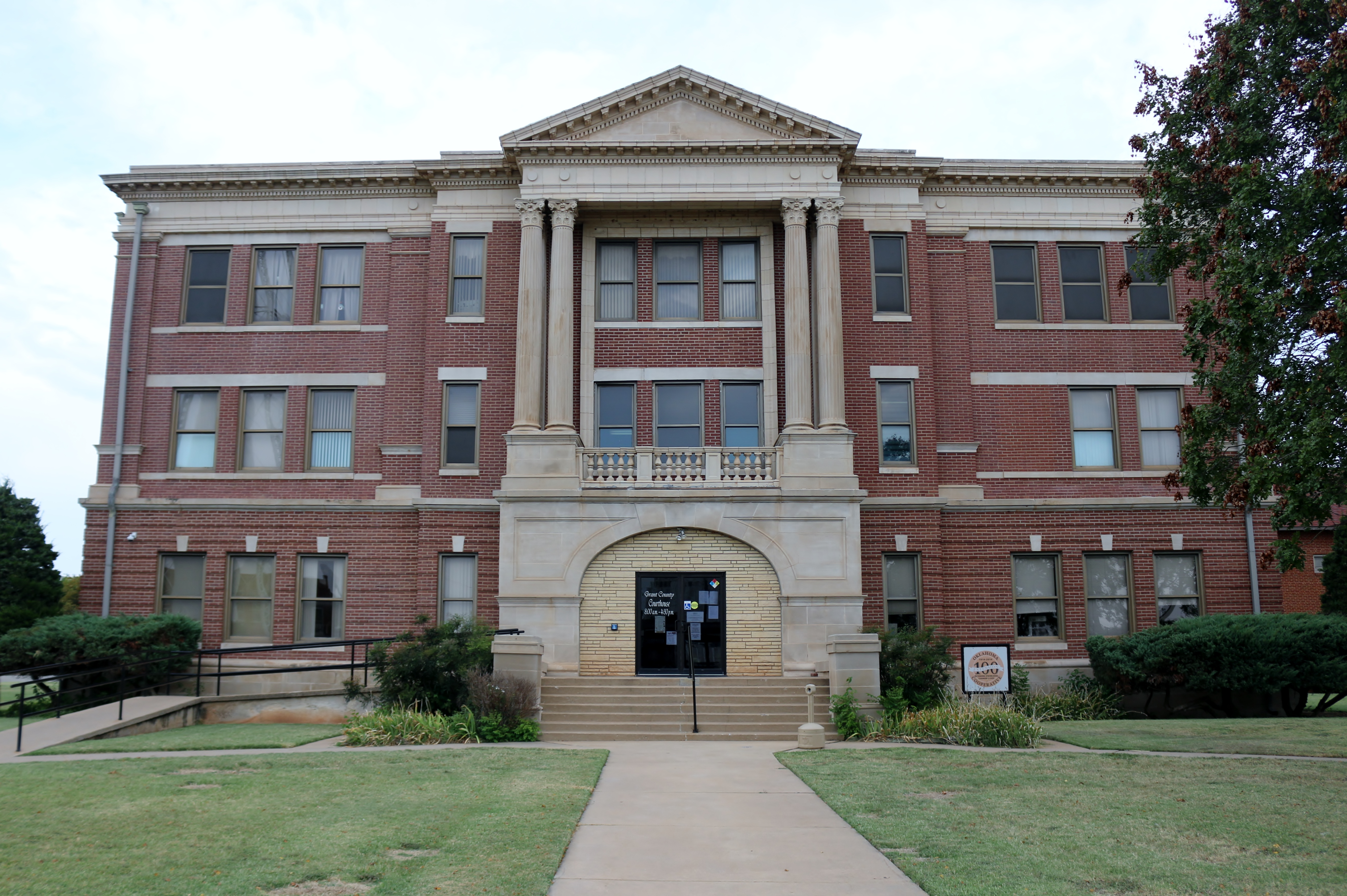
- Grant County Courthouse (2017)

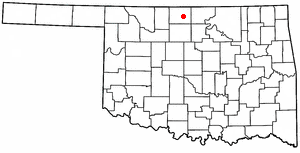
- Location of Medford within Oklahoma
- Coordinates: 36°48′12″N 97°44′17″W
- Country: United States
- State: Oklahoma
- County: Grant

Area
  - Total: 1.08 sq mi (2.80 km^{2})
  - Land: 1.08 sq mi (2.80 km^{2})
  - Water: 0 sq mi (0.00 km^{2})
- Elevation: 1,089 ft (332 m)

Population (2020)
  - Total: 932
  - Density: 864/sq mi (333.4/km^{2})
- Time zone: UTC−6 (Central (CST))
  - Summer (DST): UTC−5 (CDT)
- ZIP Code: 73759
- Area code: 580
- FIPS code: 40-47300
- GNIS feature ID: 2411068
- Website: medfordoklahoma.org

Medford is a city in and the county seat of Grant County, Oklahoma, United States. As of the 2020 census, Medford had a population of 932.

== History ==
The Encyclopedia of Oklahoma History and Culture states only that the town name was for Medford, Massachusetts, which it says was the home town of a railroad official.

Before the opening of the Cherokee Outlet to non-Indian settlement on September 16, 1893, the Chicago, Kansas and Nebraska Railway (later the Chicago, Rock Island and Pacific Railroad) built a line from southern Kansas that passed through the future Medford townsite in a north–south direction. A post office was established October 31, 1893. The townsfolk voted to incorporate on March 10, 1894. In 1897 the Gulf Railroad (later the Atchison, Topeka and Santa Fe Railway) built a line that passed through Medford from northwest to southeast. Located in a wheat-growing region, Medford served as an agricultural trade center with a flour mill and several grain elevators. By 1909 the local economy supported three banks and three weekly newspapers.

Voters in Grant County chose Medford as the county seat by an election on May 27, 1908. A courthouse was dedicated July 4, 1910. A fire destroyed five blocks of businesses and residences on June 25, 1911.

On July 9, 2022 at about 2:30 PM an explosion and fire in the ONEOK plant one mile south of the city caused an evacuation of a two mile radius around the plant. On July 11, the evacuation zone was decreased to one mile around the plant.

== Geography ==
Medford is situated at the intersection of U.S. Highway 81 (Chisholm Trail Highway) and State Highway 11. According to the United States Census Bureau, the city has a total area of 1.1 square miles (2.8 km^{2}), all land.

== Demographics ==
Historical population
Census	Pop.	Note	%±
1900	551		—
1910	1,110		101.5%
1920	1,050		−5.4%
1930	1,084		3.2%
1940	1,121		3.4%
1950	1,350		20.4%
1960	1,223		−9.4%
1970	1,304		6.6%
1980	1,419		8.8%
1990	1,172		−17.4%
2000	1,172		0.0%
2010	996		−15.0%
2020	932		−6.4%
U.S. Decennial Census

=== 2020 census ===
As of the 2020 census, Medford had a population of 932. The median age was 46.2 years. 21.5% of residents were under the age of 18 and 25.1% of residents were 65 years of age or older. For every 100 females there were 100.4 males, and for every 100 females age 18 and over there were 97.8 males age 18 and over.

0% of residents lived in urban areas, while 100.0% lived in rural areas.

There were 403 households in Medford, of which 28.3% had children under the age of 18 living in them. Of all households, 41.4% were married-couple households, 23.8% were households with a male householder and no spouse or partner present, and 29.3% were households with a female householder and no spouse or partner present. About 36.7% of all households were made up of individuals and 20.1% had someone living alone who was 65 years of age or older.

There were 477 housing units, of which 15.5% were vacant. Among occupied housing units, 75.9% were owner-occupied and 24.1% were renter-occupied. The homeowner vacancy rate was 3.8% and the rental vacancy rate was 14.2%.

Racial composition as of the 2020 census
Race	Percent
White	84.7%
Black or African American	1.2%
American Indian and Alaska Native	3.5%
Asian	0.4%
Native Hawaiian and Other Pacific Islander	0%
Some other race	3.3%
Two or more races	6.9%
Hispanic or Latino (of any race)	7.8%

=== 2000 census ===
As of the 2000 census, there were 1,172 people, 480 households, and 304 families residing in the city. The population density was 1,099.1 inhabitants per square mile (424.4/km^{2}). There were 591 housing units at an average density of 554.3 per square mile (214.0/km^{2}).

There were 480 households, out of which 30.4% had children under the age of 18 living with them, 53.5% were married couples living together, 7.1% had a female householder with no husband present, and 36.5% were non-families. Of all households, 35.0% were made up of individuals, and 20.4% had someone living alone who was 65 years of age or older. The average household size was 2.32 and the average family size was 3.01.

In the city, the population was spread out, with 24.7% under the age of 18, 6.7% from 18 to 24, 23.7% from 25 to 44, 20.7% from 45 to 64, and 24.1% who were 65 years of age or older. The median age was 41 years. For every 100 females, there were 91.5 males. For every 100 females age 18 and over, there were 90.5 males.

The median income for a household in the city was $27,708, and the median income for a family was $38,571. Males had a median income of $29,167 versus $18,667 for females. The per capita income for the city was $15,848. About 10.4% of families and 13.8% of the population were below the poverty line, including 15.9% of those under age 18 and 12.4% of those age 65 or over.

== Government ==
Medford has a council-manager form of government.

== Education ==
The school district is Medford Public Schools.

== Notable people ==
- James Kilian, professional football player
- Dennis Reimer, U.S. Army general and former Army Chief of Staff
- Apollo Soucek (1897–1955), test pilot and vice admiral in the U.S. Navy

== See also ==
- National Register of Historic Places listings in Grant County, Oklahoma
