= List of United States tornadoes from January to March 2026 =

United States tornadoes from January to March 2026
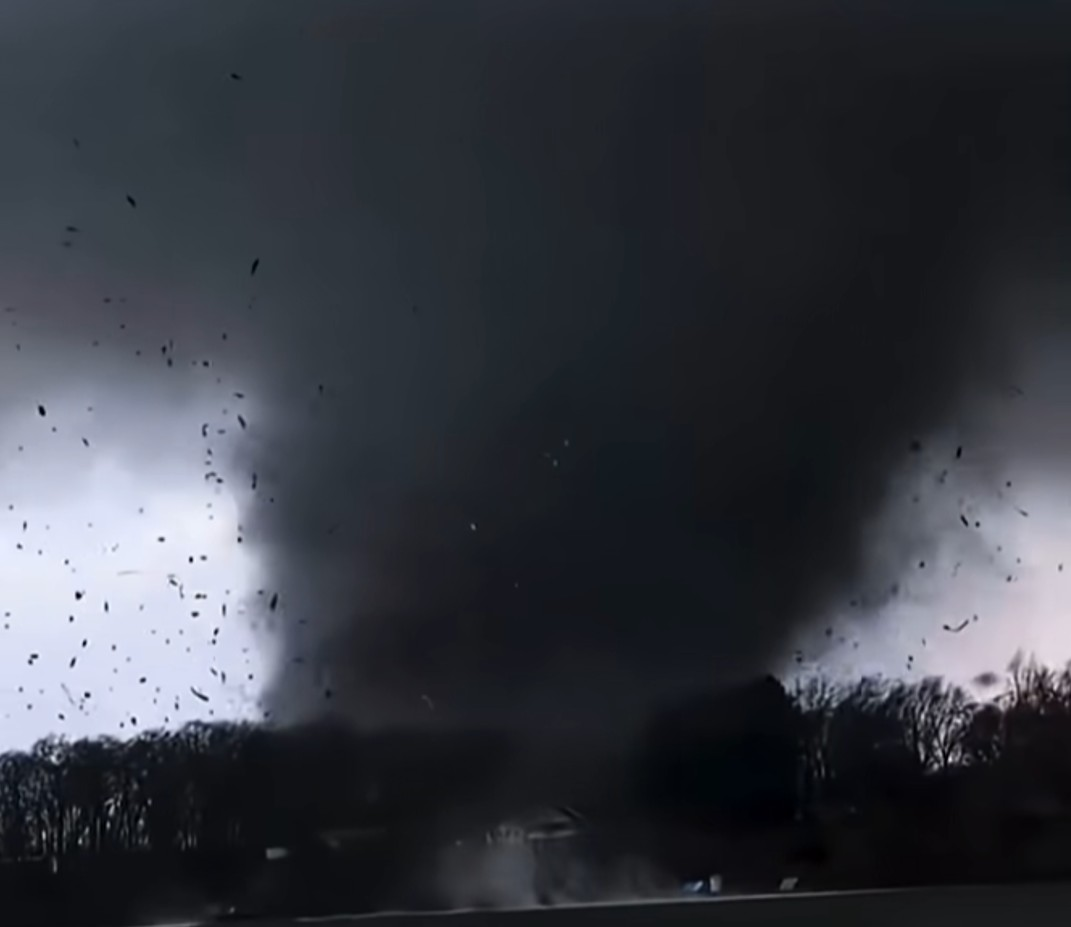
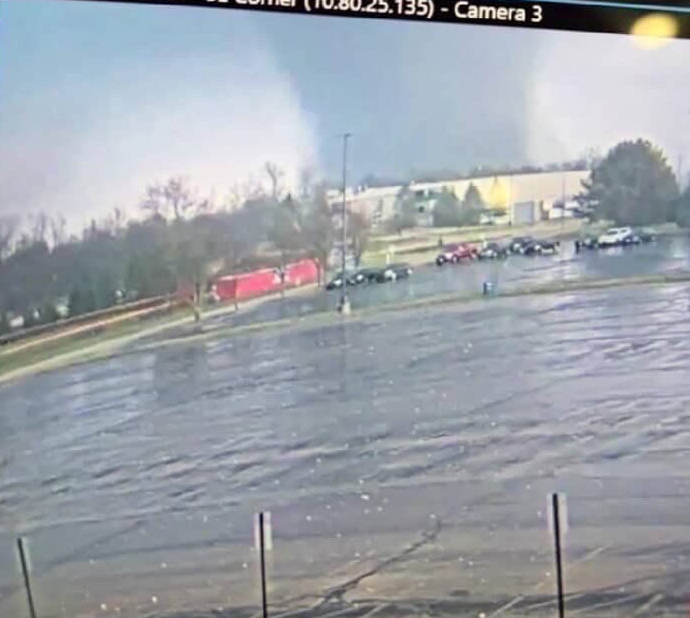
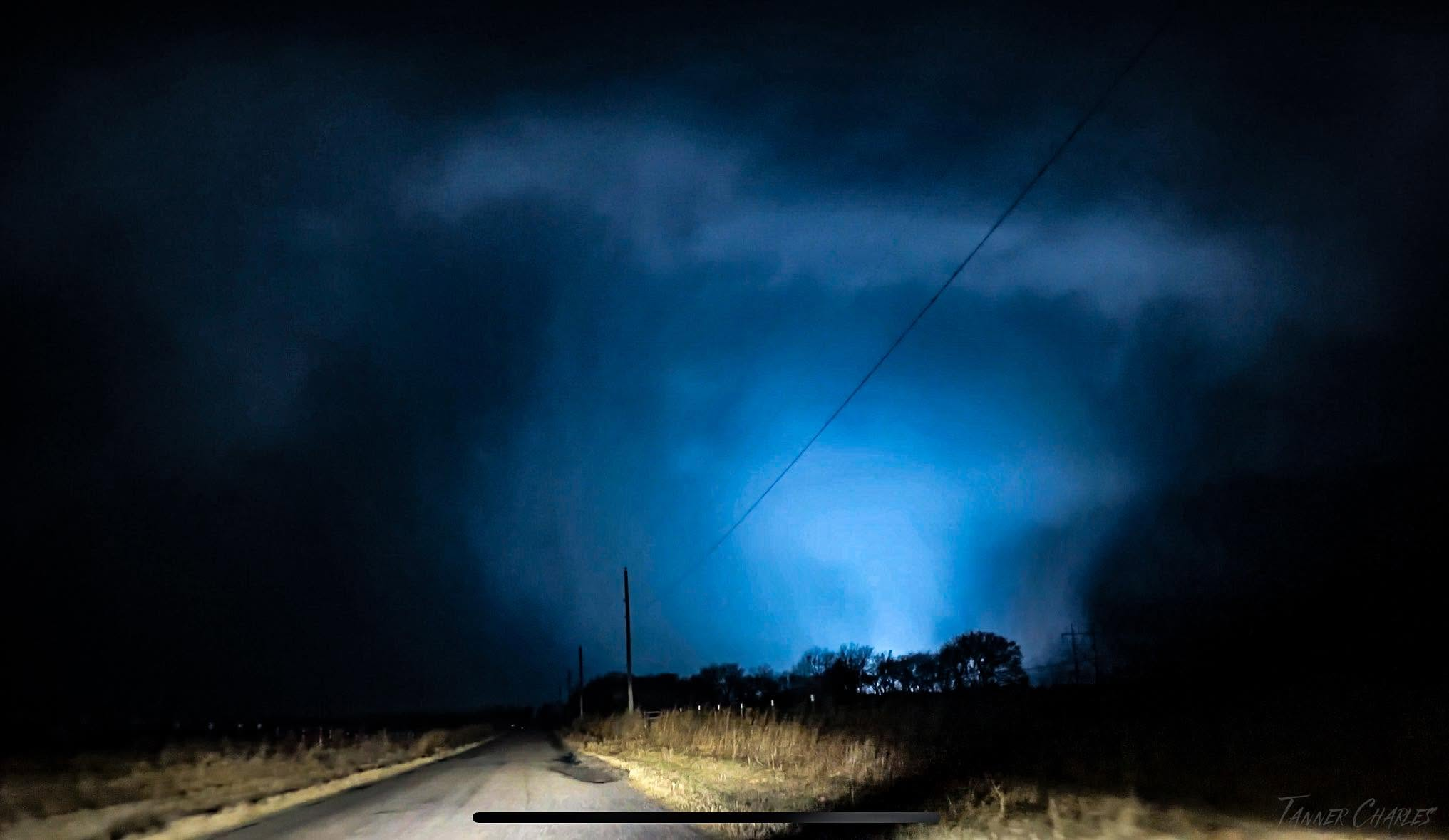
- Clockwise from top: An EF3 tornado near Union City, Michigan on March 6; an EF3 tornado near Beggs, Oklahoma on March 6; an EF3 tornado near Kankakee, Illinois on March 10
- Timespan: January 1–March 31
- Maximum rated tornado: EF3 tornado: Union City, Michigan on March 6; Beggs, Oklahoma on March 6; Kankakee, Illinois–Lake Village, Indiana on March 10
- Tornadoes: 278
- Fatalities: 11
- Injuries: 45

This page documents all tornadoes confirmed by various weather forecast offices of the National Weather Service in the United States in January to March, 2026. Tornado counts are considered preliminary until final publication in the database of the National Centers for Environmental Information. Based on the 1991–2020 average, about 35 tornadoes are typically recorded across the United States during both January and February, with the average increasing to about 80 in March. These tornadoes are commonly focused across the Southern United States due to their proximity to the unstable air mass and warm waters of the Gulf of Mexico, as well as California in association with winter storms in those three months. With the arrival of spring, tornadic activity begins to spread northward, especially late in the month.

Despite a small outbreak from January 8–10, and another small tornado event on January 25, the month finished below average with just 21 confirmed tornadoes as arctic air largely dominated the month and few winter storms affected California during the month. February likewise saw arctic air dominate through the first half of the month with very little tornadic activity until halfway through the month, when an outbreak of weak QLCS tornadoes occurred in states along the Gulf Coast on February 14–15. This was followed less than a week later by small outbreak in southern Illinois and southern Indiana on the 19th as unseasonably moist gulf moisture surged north as a pronounced low-pressure system moved across the area. Activity was limited thereafter for the rest of the month as arctic air once again took hold over the eastern part of the US. February finished with an above average total of 49 tornadoes confirmed during the month. Despite no violent tornadoes occurring in March, the month was still well above average, mainly due to three major outbreaks that occurred in the middle of the month. March also continued the recent trend of very active March's in recent years, ranking as the third most active of all time behind 2022 and 2025, finishing with 208 confirmed tornadoes during the month.

== January ==
Confirmed tornadoes by Enhanced Fujita rating
EFU	EF0	EF1	EF2	EF3	EF4	EF5	Total
1	7	11	2	0	0	0	21

=== January 1 event ===
List of confirmed tornadoes – Thursday, January 1, 2026 (Note: All dates are based on the local time zone where the tornado touched down; however, all times are in Coordinated Universal Time for consistency.)
EF#	Location	County / Parish	State	Start Coord.	Time (UTC)	Path length	Max width
EFU	ENE of Three Points	Pima	AZ	32.109°N 111.2361°W	20:05–20:06	0.38 mi (0.61 km)	1 yd (0.91 m)
EFU	A landspout was observed. No damage occurred.						

=== January 8 event ===
List of confirmed tornadoes – Thursday, January 8, 2026
EF#	Location	County / Parish	State	Start Coord.	Time (UTC)	Path length	Max width
EF2	SW of Purcell to NNE of Lexington	McClain, Cleveland	OK	34.967°N 97.443°W	13:24–13:34	9.4 mi (15.1 km)	150 yd (140 m)
EF2	This unwarned, fast-moving, and strong tornado touched down southwest of Purcell and moved northeastward, damaging homes, trees, and outbuildings, and snapping wooden powere poles. A new house sustained low-end EF2 damage when its roof was removed. The tornado then crossed SH-39 and I-35, damaging more homes, trees, and outbuildings, and injuring a person on the latter route when it overturned a semi-truck. The tornado then struck Purcell, damaging roofs, utility poles, and trees near and along SH-74. The tornado then crossed the BNSF's Red Rock Subdivision and the Canadian River into Cleveland County, significantly damaging an outbuilding north of Lexington and damaging more trees before dissipating shortly after crossing US-77.						
EF0	E of Norman	Cleveland	OK	35.241°N 97.229°W	13:44–13:45	1.8 mi (2.9 km)	50 yd (46 m)
EF0	This tornado likely developed as a waterspout over Lake Thunderbird before moving ashore, damaging trees as it traveled to the northeast.						
EF1	N of Pink to NNW of Bethel Acres	Cleveland, Pottawatomie	OK	35.319°N 97.145°W	13:52–13:57	3.95 mi (6.36 km)	75 yd (69 m)
EF1	A tornado damaged trees and a flagpole before crossing into Pottawatomie County, damaging more trees and an outbuilding. At least two houses between the Shawnee Lakes sustained roof damage.						
EF1	NNW of Shawnee to S of Aydelotte	Pottawatomie	OK	35.369°N 96.94°W	14:06–14:09	2.6 mi (4.2 km)	40 yd (37 m)
EF1	This tornado developed north of the Shawnee Regional Airport and moved northeast, damaging a couple of homes before crossing I-40/SH-3E and damaging a hotel. The tornado then crossed over the Arkansas–Oklahoma Railroad and damaged another business before dissipating just west of SH-18.						
EF1	Wynona	Osage	OK	36.538°N 96.327°W	14:41–14:42	0.8 mi (1.3 km)	100 yd (91 m)
EF1	A brief tornado damaged the roofs of several homes, destroyed a large outbuilding, snapped power poles, and downed trees.						

=== January 9 event ===
List of confirmed tornadoes – Friday, January 9, 2026
EF#	Location	County / Parish	State	Start Coord.	Time (UTC)	Path length	Max width
EF1	E of Tylertown to E of Kokomo	Walthall, Marion	MS	31.11°N 90.04°W	12:23–12:40	6.81 mi (10.96 km)	125 yd (114 m)
EF1	This tornado touched down, uprooting several trees and causing minor roof damage. Additional light tree damage was observed along the path as the tornado crossed into Marion County. It then damaged the roof of a restaurant as it crossed US 98 damaged at least one other tree before dissipating.						
EF0	N of Ofahoma	Madison, Leake	MS	32.7595°N 89.7519°W	12:29–12:38	4.61 mi (7.42 km)	75 yd (69 m)
EF0	This weak tornado touched down near MS 43, uprooting trees and snapping tree limbs, including one that downed a power line. It dissipated after crossing the Natchez Trace Parkway.						
EF0	Northern Laurel	Jones	MS	31.7369°N 89.1478°W	14:47–14:48	0.32 mi (0.51 km)	50 yd (46 m)
EF0	A brief and weak tornado was caught on surveillance cameras damaging a sign and tree limbs. An adult care facility and several apartment buildings had their shingles damaged as the tornado crossed MS 15 and dissipated.						

=== January 10 event ===
List of confirmed tornadoes – Saturday, January 10, 2026
EF#	Location	County / Parish	State	Start Coord.	Time (UTC)	Path length	Max width
EF1	SE of Coushatta	Red River	LA	31.999°N 93.2911°W	06:04–06:06	0.41 mi (0.66 km)	84 yd (77 m)
EF1	A brief tornado touched down near US 71 and snapped large tree branches and uprooted or snapped several trees.						
EF0	E of Sontag	Lawrence	MS	31.6431°N 90.1325°W	07:58–07:59	0.72 mi (1.16 km)	60 yd (55 m)
EF0	A weak tornado caused minor tree damage in Wanilla.						
EF0	SW of Stringer	Jasper	MS	31.8392°N 89.3138°W	10:06–10:07	0.6 mi (0.97 km)	50 yd (46 m)
EF0	A barn had tin peeled off its roof, a tree was snapped, and multiple other large tree limbs were broken.						
EF1	Carson to N of Bassfield	Jefferson Davis	MS	31.5307°N 89.796°W	10:21–10:31	5.35 mi (8.61 km)	350 yd (320 m)
EF1	This tornado touched down just south of Carson and moved northeast into Carson. As the tornado crossed MS 42 on the east side of Carson, it produced widespread tree and vegetation damage with numerous trees uprooted or snapped. A chicken farm along the path sustained substantial damage while most nearby homes experienced little to no structural impact. Continuing northeast, the tornado crossed MS 35 and caused further tree damage. It went on to damage another chicken farm before ending shortly afterward in a wooded area, where tree damage gradually diminished.						
EF1	SE of Heidelberg to Vossburg to SE of Barnett	Jasper, Clarke	MS	31.8682°N 88.971°W	11:41–11:56	10.42 mi (16.77 km)	300 yd (270 m)
EF1	This tornado began near the intersection of US 11 and MS 528, initially causing minor damage such as broken tree limbs as it moved across southeastern Jasper County. As it progressed, the roof of a mobile home was damaged and several trees were uprooted. After passing through Vossburg and crossing into Clarke County, the tornado intensified, producing a more concentrated path of snapped trees west of the Goodwater community. Additional tree limb damage occurred farther along the path before the tornado lifted near Nancy.						
EF0	N of Fruithurst	Cleburne	AL	33.7984°N 85.4927°W	14:41–14:42	7.4 mi (11.9 km)	75 yd (69 m)
EF0	A weak tornado began in a heavily forested area where pine trees were uprooted and large limbs were snapped. The tornado crossed a broad stretch of inaccessible terrain, continuing to cause scattered tree damage before emerging with additional snapped and uprooted pines. Minor damage occurred to a few homes as the tornado progressed while tree damage gradually increased approaching the Mars Hill area. The most notable impacts there included four chicken houses being struck, with roofing peeled off three of them. A nearby home sustained minor roof damage, a detached garage was damaged by a falling tree, and a shed was destroyed at another residence. Beyond this point, the damage became increasingly sparse, consisting mainly of additional pine tree damage, before the tornado dissipated just short of the Georgia state line.						
EF1	E of Roopville	Carroll	GA	33.4539°N 85.048°W	15:54–16:01	1.03 mi (1.66 km)	150 yd (140 m)
EF1	A tornado touched down just south of Lowell, initially causing damage at a residence where a two-story home lost a significant portion of its roof covering and suffered severe damage to a wall, though the structure remained standing. Nearby, a barn was nearly destroyed, with large posts anchored in concrete ripped out of the ground and debris thrown more than 300 yards (270 m). As the tornado tracked east, it damaged another barn and uprooted several trees. Farther along the path, an older barn was heavily damaged, losing most of its metal roof and experiencing wall collapse, while additional trees were snapped or uprooted in adjacent wooded areas as the tornado ultimately dissipated.						

=== January 25 event ===
List of confirmed tornadoes – Sunday, January 25, 2026
EF#	Location	County / Parish	State	Start Coord.	Time (UTC)	Path length	Max width
EF1	SSW of Montgomery	Lowndes, Montgomery	AL	32.2218°N 86.4555°W	17:16–17:20	3.31 mi (5.33 km)	65 yd (59 m)
EF1	This tornado first caused minor tree damage with several snapped and uprooted trees, then continued east producing additional scattered timber damage. It struck a small residential area where a manufactured home lost its entire sheet-metal roof and two site-built homes sustained notable roof and carport damage, with insulation and debris scattered in different directions, while nearby trees were also snapped or uprooted. The tornado weakened afterward, causing lighter tree damage before reaching the shoulder of I-65 and dissipating.						
EF1	NW of Defuniak Springs	Walton	FL	30.7907°N 86.2036°W	19:23–19:25	1.09 mi (1.75 km)	800 yd (730 m)
EF1	A brief tornado touched down in a residential area and moved east, causing mostly weak damage as it snapped limbs and downed trees through neighborhoods and near Kings Lake. Near the start of the path, two large trees were uprooted, and toward the end the storm intensified briefly, tearing away a significant portion of roofing and heavily damaging a home's porch. Just before crossing US 331, the tornado quickly lifted with no additional damage observed beyond that point.						
EF2	Geneva to Eunola	Geneva	AL	31.0369°N 85.8784°W	19:29–19:33	3.61 mi (5.81 km)	900 yd (820 m)
EF2	This strong tornado touched down in western Geneva along SR 196 and produced moderate damage, including scattered roof and tree damage to homes. It briefly intensified in downtown Geneva, where roofing was peeled off three adjacent low-rise building along SR 27. After crossing a swampy area, numerous trees were snapped near SR 52 at the Choctawhatchee River, and the storm continued east through Eunola with intermittent tree and minor structural damage before lifting after crossing over Spring Creek.						
EF1	WSW of Pleasant Plains to SE of Columbia	Houston	AL	31.3001°N 85.2439°W	19:52–20:09	8.6 mi (13.8 km)	300 yd (270 m)
EF1	This low-end EF1 tornado began by snapping large tree branches and peeling shingles from a manufactured home. It then tracked east-southeast causing additional softwood trees to snap. After crossing SR 52, it bent a street sign and continued to break tree limbs and produce scattered tree damage. Farther along, a tin RV carport was partially collapsed and more trees were snapped as the tornado crossed SR 52 before the it lifted along the Chattahoochee River right before crossing the Georgia state line.						
EF0	SE of Madrid	Houston	AL	31.0227°N 85.3718°W	20:02–20:03	0.09 mi (0.14 km)	50 yd (46 m)
EF0	This very brief, weak tornado lifted the roof off of a manufactured home.						

== February ==
Confirmed tornadoes by Enhanced Fujita rating
EFU	EF0	EF1	EF2	EF3	EF4	EF5	Total
5	20	23	1	0	0	0	49

=== February 3 event ===
List of confirmed tornadoes – Tuesday, February 3, 2026
EF#	Location	County / Parish	State	Start Coord.	Time (UTC)	Path length	Max width
EF0	NNW of Plum Grove	Liberty	TX	30.2531°N 95.1018°W	21:24–21:25	0.28 mi (0.45 km)	65 yd (59 m)
EF0	This weak tornado briefly touched down in a wooded area and tracked east for a short distance before lifting. Damage was mainly limited to snapped pine trunks, broken branches, and sections of fencing blown down, with some power lines knocked down though poles remained standing.						
EF0	N of Plum Grove	Liberty	TX	30.255°N 95.0865°W	21:27–21:33	1.76 mi (2.83 km)	120 yd (110 m)
EF0	A high-end EF0 tornado began near FM 1010, where an uprooted tree and broken wooden signage marked the initial touchdown. It intensified as it struck a metal structure and then moved through open fields with intermittent tree damage. Entering a nearby subdivision, the tornado snapped trees, damaged fences, and bent or damaged additional metal structures before weakening and dissipating.						

=== February 14 event ===
List of confirmed tornadoes – Saturday, February 14, 2026
EF#	Location	County / Parish	State	Start Coord.	Time (UTC)	Path length	Max width
EF1	NE of Center	Shelby	TX	31.8731°N 94.1195°W	00:03–00:05	1.08 mi (1.74 km)	275 yd (251 m)
EF1	This tornado produced mainly tree damage as it tracked southeast, with numerous trees downed early in its path. As it crossed SH 7, damage became more concentrated, including a swath of snapped softwood trees. Farther southeast, one outbuilding was destroyed, with only minor additional damage to nearby structures. Localized snapping of tree trunks was also evident near a pond shortly before the tornado dissipated.						
EFU	Southern Fort Polk	Vernon	LA	31.029°N 93.108°W	02:10–02:14	2.62 mi (4.22 km)	1 yd (0.91 m)
EFU	A tornado occurred within Fort Polk and likely caused damage, however the tornado tracked entire over inaccessible area.						
EF0	Southern Carlyss to Southern Prien	Calcasieu	LA	30.141°N 93.364°W	02:38–02:45	6.01 mi (9.67 km)	50 yd (46 m)
EF0	A high-end EF0 tornado moved through the area near an elementary school, producing mainly tree damage and minor siding damage as it crossed near Moss Lake. It then crossed the Calcasieu River and moved through the northern portion of Gray Plantation neighborhood, where additional trees were damaged and a shed was overturned. Near the end of its path, the tornado caused more significant shingle damage to homes before dissipating.						
EF1	N of Elizabeth	Rapides	LA	30.97°N 92.8°W	02:41–02:42	0.23 mi (0.37 km)	50 yd (46 m)
EF1	A brief tornado completely destroyed four outbuildings.						
EF0	N of Boyce	Grant	LA	31.4101°N 92.6689°W	02:45–02:46	0.42 mi (0.68 km)	150 yd (140 m)
EF0	This brief tornado touched down near LA 8 and downed branches from a hardwood tree before removing metal roofing from a barn, scattering this debris east of the highway before lifting.						
EF0	SSW of Calcasieu	Rapides	LA	30.991°N 92.748°W	02:47–02:51	1.55 mi (2.49 km)	40 yd (37 m)
EF0	A weak tornado damaged and uprooted pine trees. Large tree branches were also snapped.						
EF1	S of Lake Charles	Calcasieu	LA	30.168°N 93.186°W	02:55–02:59	1 mi (1.6 km)	50 yd (46 m)
EF1	A tornado damaged mobile homes, large hardwood trees, and a home's roof along LA 14. Several additional homes and outbuildings were damaged as the tornado traveled southeast.						
EF1	SSW of Oberlin	Allen	LA	30.5902°N 92.7847°W	03:05–03:06	0.21 mi (0.34 km)	50 yd (46 m)
EF1	A brief, low-end EF1 tornado snapped and damaged numerous trees on either side of US 165.						
EF1	S of Turkey Creek to NW of Bayou Chicot	Evangeline	LA	30.831°N 92.42°W	03:11–03:15	3.28 mi (5.28 km)	100 yd (91 m)
EF1	This tornado touched down in a wooded area west of LA 13 and tracked northeast before dissipating near US 167. Along its path, several pine trees were snapped at the trunks, multiple outbuildings were destroyed or had roofs peeled away, and a canopy was lifted and thrown a distance from its original location.						
EF1	NW of Pine Prairie	Evangeline	LA	30.825°N 92.474°W	03:12–03:15	0.42 mi (0.68 km)	75 yd (69 m)
EF1	Six outbuildings were damaged and several trees were snapped.						
EF0	NW of Cheneyville	Rapides	LA	31.021°N 92.322°W	03:20–03:25	2.03 mi (3.27 km)	50 yd (46 m)
EF0	This tornado touched down east of US 71 and moved northeast, causing damage to several outbuildings, including one that was heavily damaged. Along the path, trees were snapped or uprooted, and a mobile home sustained significant damage when its roof was peeled off.						
EF0	NW of Bunkie	Avoyelles	LA	30.969°N 92.205°W	03:28–03:30	0.31 mi (0.50 km)	50 yd (46 m)
EF0	Trees and fences had minor damage.						
EF0	SE of Crowley	Acadia	LA	30.175°N 92.345°W	04:03–04:05	0.12 mi (0.19 km)	30 yd (27 m)
EF0	A tornado damaged an outbuilding and a canopy.						
EF1	SE of Crowley	Acadia	LA	30.168°N 92.317°W	04:06–04:08	0.31 mi (0.50 km)	70 yd (64 m)
EF1	This brief tornado touched down along a road where it damaged and snapped trees before destroying an outbuilding.						
EF1	S of Port Barre	St. Landry	LA	30.533°N 91.953°W	04:11–04:13	0.68 mi (1.09 km)	10 yd (9.1 m)
EF1	This tornado touched down along LA 741, lifting sheet metal roofing from a home. Several outbuildings were destroyed or damaged, with additional tree damage. A pontoon boat and horse trailer were flipped before the tornado continued northeast across a field and lifted south of US 190.						
EF1	NNW of Norwood, LA to Southern Centreville	Wilkinson, Amite	MS	31.04°N 91.16°W	04:54–05:04	8.45 mi (13.60 km)	100 yd (91 m)
EF1	A tornado touched down, initially downing a few trees, including one that brought down a powerline. As it tracked northeast, damage intensified briefly where roughly a dozen trees were uprooted or snapped. Farther along the path, damage became more sporadic and consisted mainly of broken limbs and isolated tree damage. Near Centreville Academy, minor impacts were observed, including a toppled light pole, partial roof uplift on a metal building, and a baseball pitching backstop that was thrown about 250 feet (76 m) into a chain-link fence.						
EF0	NE of Port Hudson to W of Slaughter	East Feliciana	LA	30.71°N 91.24°W	05:09–05:15	3.56 mi (5.73 km)	100 yd (91 m)
EF0	Sporadic minor tree damage occurred.						
EF1	W of Liberty	Amite	MS	31.14°N 90.93°W	05:12–05:19	5.48 mi (8.82 km)	175 yd (160 m)
EF1	A manufactured home received minor roof damage and numerous trees were snapped or uprooted.						
EF1	E of Liberty to W of Summit	Amite	MS	31.15°N 90.71°W	05:27–05:41	12.62 mi (20.31 km)	200 yd (180 m)
EF1	This tornado snapped or uprooted numerous trees as it tracked through predominantly forested terrain.						
EF1	NW of Summit to N of Norfield	Amite, Pike, Lincoln	MS	31.33°N 90.56°W	05:44–05:54	8.57 mi (13.79 km)	800 yd (730 m)
EF1	This multi-vortex tornado began on US 98, causing minor damage to trees and removing a few metal panels from an outbuilding. The tornado then moved into Pike County and continued tracking northeast, causing tree damage, before entering Lincoln County. The tornado continued uprooting numerous trees along its path and eventually reached high-end EF1 intensity as it was hitting structures. A house sustained shingle damage, several outbuildings were damaged, and a mobile home was also affected as the tornado moved through rural areas. The tornado crossed I-55 a few miles south of the Bogue Chitto exit, then weakened and lifted as it moved through the Norfield community, with tree damage diminishing near the end of the path.						

=== February 15 event ===
List of confirmed tornadoes – Sunday, February 15, 2026
EF#	Location	County / Parish	State	Start Coord.	Time (UTC)	Path length	Max width
EF1	ESE of White Castle to SSE of Sorrento	Ascension	LA	30.14°N 91.09°W	06:01–06:20	15.55 mi (25.03 km)	150 yd (140 m)
EF1	This long-tracked QLCS tornado touched down along LA 1 in far western Ascension Parish, initially snapping large branches and small tree trunks. It moved eastward across LA 405 and crossed the Mississippi River, producing continued tree damage near Darrow, then tracked east-southeast toward LA 22 with additional snapped branches. The tornado crossed the Mississippi River a second time, briefly intensified near LA 70 where a few tree trunks were snapped, and then weakened and lifted over marshland near the Ascension–St. James Parish line.						
EF1	NNE of Bogue Chitto to SE of Brookhaven	Lincoln	MS	31.49°N 90.41°W	06:02–06:05	2.26 mi (3.64 km)	200 yd (180 m)
EF1	The roof of an outbuilding was damaged, a house near MS 583 sustained roof damage, and several trees were snapped or uprooted.						
EF1	Southern Donaldsonville to SE of Sorrento	Ascension, St. James	LA	30.07°N 91.04°W	06:06–06:28	18.01 mi (28.98 km)	200 yd (180 m)
EF1	This long-tracked QLCS tornado touched down near the Ascension–Assumption Parish line, initially snapping large branches and uprooting trees before strengthening near LA 70, where a power pole and tree trunk were broken. It continued east-northeast through open fields into St. James Parish, snapping multiple power lines near industrial facilities and again along LA 18. After being on the ground for over 20 minutes, the tornado weakened as it crossed the Mississippi River, causing additional minor power line and tree damage near Airline Highway and I-10 and eventually lifted.						
EF1	N of East Lincoln to SSW of Sontag	Lincoln, Lawrence	MS	31.51°N 90.28°W	06:10–06:20	6.97 mi (11.22 km)	250 yd (230 m)
EF1	A tornado began with minor tree damage, breaking large branches and snapping several trees as it tracked northeast. It caused additional tree damage and removed portions of roofing from a home, then crossed US 84, where more trees were uprooted. After entering Lawrence County, the tornado damaged the roof of an outbuilding before dissipating shortly thereafter.						
EF1	SE of Monticello	Lawrence	MS	31.51°N 90.11°W	06:22–06:29	3.85 mi (6.20 km)	200 yd (180 m)
EF1	This tornado inflicted minor roof damage to a home and then intensified as it moved northeast, uprooting trees and damaging a manufactured home. It crossed MS 587, snapping additional trees along its path, then continued across the Pearl River. The tornado weakened near MS 184, where it snapped large tree branches before dissipating.						
EF0	E of Monticello	Lawrence	MS	31.53°N 90.05°W	06:27–06:30	1.99 mi (3.20 km)	200 yd (180 m)
EF0	A high-end EF0 tornado uprooted several trees and snapped tree branches.						
EF1	ENE of Arm to SW of Prentiss	Jefferson Davis	MS	31.52°N 89.95°W	06:32–06:35	3.8 mi (6.1 km)	350 yd (320 m)
EF1	A utility wire was downed, a mobile home was damaged, and numerous trees were uprooted or had their branches snapped.						
EF1	Western Prentiss	Jefferson Davis	MS	31.58°N 89.89°W	06:38–06:45	5.86 mi (9.43 km)	200 yd (180 m)
EF1	This low-end EF1 tornado began on the west side of Prentiss, uprooting and damaging trees as it crossed MS 184. As it moved across US 84 on the northwest side of town, it tore off a large portion of the roof of a house. The tornado then continued northeast, crossing MS 42, where it caused additional tree damage and damaged the roof of an outbuilding. Near the end of its path, it damaged several older poultry houses along MS 13 before lifting.						
EF1	SW of Uneedus to WNW of Blond	Tangipahoa, St. Tammany	LA	30.59°N 90.29°W	06:42–06:56	9.08 mi (14.61 km)	75 yd (69 m)
EF1	A tornado touched down near a residential area, damaging a home primarily by removing portions of its roof. As it moved east, sporadic tree damage occurred, with the most severe impacts found where more than a dozen large, mature trees were uprooted or snapped. Farther along the path, periodic damage to trees and large limbs continued until the tornado dissipated in a subdivision.						
EF0	SE of Stoney Point to NE of Zona	Washington	LA	30.76°N 90.21°W	06:45–07:00	11.8 mi (19.0 km)	75 yd (69 m)
EF0	This tornado initially snapped a large hardwood tree and inflicted minor damage to a manufactured home. As it moved east-northeast, tree damage became more widespread, with snapped trunks and branches. After crossing the Bogue Chitto River, the tornado continued to produce mostly minor tree damage near LA 25 and LA 16. Damage gradually became less concentrated before the tornado dissipated, with only scattered tree damage noted near the end of its path.						
EF0	Southern Thibodaux to NW of Raceland	Lafourche, Terrebonne	LA	29.78°N 90.84°W	06:45–06:56	7.29 mi (11.73 km)	50 yd (46 m)
EF0	This high-end EF0 tornado touched down on the southern side of Thibodaux, initially causing minor damage as it partially flipped a trailer RV. The tornado then reached its peak intensity when it struck a church, lifting and shifting a large portion of the roof eastward. As it continued east-southeast, damage became more sporadic and mostly limited to snapped large tree branches and the uplift of a backyard awning. The tornado weakened further, producing mainly minor vegetation damage before lifting north of Rousseau over marshland.						
EF1	NNW of Prentiss	Jefferson Davis	MS	31.67°N 89.85°W	06:47–06:50	2.07 mi (3.33 km)	150 yd (140 m)
EF1	Minor tree damage occurred.						
EF1	NNE of Ora	Covington	MS	31.7°N 89.55°W	07:11–07:12	0.59 mi (0.95 km)	75 yd (69 m)
EF1	Three chicken houses were damaged and a couple of trees were uprooted.						
EF0	S of Taylorsville	Covington	MS	31.79°N 89.44°W	07:24–07:25	0.3 mi (0.48 km)	25 yd (23 m)
EF0	A weak tornado inflicted minor damage to trees.						
EF0	NW of McNeill	Pearl River	MS	30.73°N 89.71°W	07:32–07:35	3.05 mi (4.91 km)	70 yd (64 m)
EF0	This tornado occurred entirely within forested terrain, damaging and displacing trees.						

=== February 19 event ===
List of confirmed tornadoes – Thursday, February 19, 2026
EF#	Location	County / Parish	State	Start Coord.	Time (UTC)	Path length	Max width
EFU	ESE of Mason	Effingham	IL	38.943°N 88.58°W	21:16–21:17	0.18 mi (0.29 km)	20 yd (18 m)
EFU	A brief tornado was documented by a storm chaser.						
EF0	SE of Wheeler	Jasper	IL	39.03°N 88.3°W	21:42–21:44	1.46 mi (2.35 km)	30 yd (27 m)
EF0	Minor tree damage occurred.						
EF0	SW of Yale	Jasper	IL	39.09°N 88.07°W	22:02–22:04	0.55 mi (0.89 km)	30 yd (27 m)
EF0	A short-lived tornado occurred in an open field, matting down grass.						
EFU	NE of Landes	Crawford	IL	38.872°N 87.877°W	22:09–22:10	0.28 mi (0.45 km)	20 yd (18 m)
EFU	This brief tornado occurred in an open field.						
EF1	ESE of Hardinville to SE of Duncanville	Crawford	IL	38.904°N 87.787°W	22:20–22:34	6.86 mi (11.04 km)	400 yd (370 m)
EF1	A high-end EF1 tornado touched down, initially causing tree damage before intensifying as it moved northeast. At peak strength, it severely damaged multiple homes, including a mobile home that was thrown off its foundation and wrapped around a tree, seriously injuring an elderly woman. The tornado continued northeast, crossing several tree lines and damaging additional homes and farm buildings. Damage then weakened to mostly minor tree damage before the tornado dissipated northwest of Flat Rock.						
EFU	NNE of Annapolis	Crawford	IL	39.164°N 87.809°W	22:32–22:33	0.11 mi (0.18 km)	10 yd (9.1 m)
EFU	This brief tornado was recorded over an open field.						
EF0	NW of Carlisle to ESE of Paxton	Sullivan	IN	38.99°N 87.44°W	22:52–22:59	4.1 mi (6.6 km)	300 yd (270 m)
EF0	A high-end EF0 tornado first moved east-northeast across farmland, where it snapped a mix of hardwood and softwood trees and damaged several small outbuildings northwest of Carlisle. The strongest damage occurred after the tornado crossed US 41 just south of Paxton, where an outbuilding was completely destroyed, multiple large trees were knocked down, and a nearby home sustained tree-related damage. The tornado then weakened, leaving only minor tree damage as it lifted near the Sullivan–Greene County line.						
EF2	Western Bloomington	Monroe	IN	39.14°N 86.64°W	23:57–00:06	3.73 mi (6.00 km)	440 yd (400 m)
EF2	This strong tornado formed in wooded areas west of the Monroe County Airport and quickly intensified as it moved into a nearby residential area, where extensive tree damage and significant structural damage to homes occurred. It then struck the airport, damaging an airplane hangar, before continuing east and damaging numerous more homes. As the tornado entered a newly constructed neighborhood, additional significant damage was observed, followed by weaker damage at an apartment complex to the northeast. The tornado dissipated near the business district west of I-69, where it damaged a bank overhang and caused roof damage to multiple warehouse buildings.						
EF0	N of Bible Grove to SW of Latona	Clay, Effingham	IL	38.912°N 88.467°W	00:15–00:26	4.01 mi (6.45 km)	125 yd (114 m)
EF0	A weak tornado blew metal off of the top of a silo and damaged a barn.						
EF0	E of Edgewood	Clay, Effingham	IL	38.911°N 88.66°W	00:18–00:21	1.78 mi (2.86 km)	25 yd (23 m)
EF0	Several tree branches were damaged.						
EFU	W of Greensburg	Decatur	IN	39.34°N 85.54°W	01:35–01:37	0.92 mi (1.48 km)	25 yd (23 m)
EFU	This small tornado caused no damage.						

=== February 26 event ===
List of confirmed tornadoes – Thursday, February 26, 2026
EF#	Location	County / Parish	State	Start Coord.	Time (UTC)	Path length	Max width
EF0	Southwestern Trussville	Jefferson	AL	33.6106°N 86.6297°W	21:41–21:45	1.63 mi (2.62 km)	65 yd (59 m)
EF0	This high-end EF0 tornado first caused damage where a construction trailer was flipped, metal roofing was peeled back, storage unit doors were blown in, and a tight cluster of trees were uprooted. After crossing US 11, minor roof damage occurred at a car wash and a restaurant. The tornado then damaged a warehouse, partially blowing in large doors, removing sections of roofing, and damaging fencing at a nearby business, while several flatbed semi-trailers were shifted in a lot. After crossing a railroad, additional warehouse damage occurred with large doors blown in and substantial metal roofing torn away. Moving upslope into a residential area, the tornado produced widespread shingle loss, fence damage, downed trees and limbs, and damage to at least one garage door. A large piece of metal roofing from the earlier warehouse was carried into the neighborhood, striking a home, causing significant roof damage before sliding off and coming to rest against another house. Minor tree and shingle damage continued farther along the path, including a small cluster of uprooted trees, before the tornado dissipated with only very light damage observed near a nearby lake.						

== March ==
Confirmed tornadoes by Enhanced Fujita rating
EFU	EF0	EF1	EF2	EF3	EF4	EF5	Total
16	79	100	10	3	0	0	208

=== March 5 event ===
List of confirmed tornadoes – Thursday, March 5, 2026
EF#	Location	County / Parish	State	Start Coord.	Time (UTC)	Path length	Max width
EF0	W of Putnam	Dewey	OK		01:22–01:23	0.5 mi (0.80 km)	50 yd (46 m)
EF0	This tornado was documented by a storm chaser and produced no damage.						
EF2	W of Fairview	Major	OK		02:08–02:26	7.1 mi (11.4 km)	300 yd (270 m)
EF2	2 deaths – A strong tornado initially caused tree and power pole damage and twisted. As it approached US 60, it rolled a car approximately 520 yards (480 m) northeast, killing the two occupants in the car, while wooden transmission and utility poles were broken along and north of the highway. The tornado continued northeast through rural areas, causing additional tree damage before dissipating.						
EF1	W of Orienta to NNW of Cleo Springs	Major	OK		02:41–02:55	6.4 mi (10.3 km)	300 yd (270 m)
EF1	This tornado heavily damaged outbuildings at its touchdown point along US 412. Damage to trees and power poles occurred along the remainder of the tornado's path with a residence also sustaining minor damage before the tornado dissipated.						
EF2	WSW of Helena to NW of Nash	Alfalfa, Grant	OK		03:12–03:51	19.14 mi (30.80 km)	880 yd (800 m)
EF2	The tornado developed and damaged power poles and trees as it moved northeastward, including near SH-45. It strengthened north of Helena along SH-58, where numerous power poles were broken along a mile-long stretch and at least three barns were destroyed. The tornado continued northeastward, causing additional tree and power pole damage, including broken poles east of Jet and along US 64 on both sides of the Alfalfa-Grant County line. After entering Grant County west of Nash, it continued damaging trees and power poles while turning more north-northeastward before dissipating.						
EF1	S of Wakita	Grant	OK		04:22–04:35	6.1 mi (9.8 km)	150 yd (140 m)
EF1	This EF1 tornado unroofed a mobile home, destroyed two outbuildings, snapped tree branches, and damaged or snapped wooden power poles.						
EF0	NNW of Renfrow	Grant	OK		04:50–04:53	1.85 mi (2.98 km)	30 yd (27 m)
EF0	Tree damage occurred.						
EFU	SSE of Cheyenne	Roger Mills	OK		04:57–04:59	1 mi (1.6 km)	200 yd (180 m)
EFU	This tornado was observed by a storm chaser and produced no damage.						
EF1	NW of Wakita	Grant	OK		05:09–05:11	1.75 mi (2.82 km)	50 yd (46 m)
EF1	A barn was damaged.						
EF2	E of Bluff City	Sumner	KS		05:34–05:37	1 mi (1.6 km)	120 yd (110 m)
EF2	A high-end EF2 tornado overturned an oil pumpjack, damaged an oil tank battery and several outbuildings, and snapped a few power poles and cedar trees.						
EF1	ESE of Freeport	Sumner	KS		05:48–05:52	1.77 mi (2.85 km)	60 yd (55 m)
EF1	A few outbuildings were damaged, several hay bales were tossed, and some headstones in a cemetery were knocked over.						

=== March 6 event ===
List of confirmed tornadoes – Friday, March 6, 2026
EF#	Location	County / Parish	State	Start Coord.	Time (UTC)	Path length	Max width
EF1	NW of Edwardsburg to Williamsville	Cass	MI		20:09–20:35	13.35 mi (21.48 km)	350 yd (320 m)
EF1	1 death – This tornado touched down in a residential area, destroying an attached garage and damaging the front of a nearby home, killing an occupant in the home. The tornado moved northeast, producing mainly tree damage along with minor roof damage to a few homes as it continued through the area. The tornado then widened and intensified, snapping and uprooting numerous trees while causing roof damage to several homes and pole barns before crossing M-62. Continuing northeast, it produced additional tree damage around several nearby lakes before lifting shortly afterward. This was the first tornado to be produced by the Southwest Michigan supercell.						
EF2	Three Rivers to NW of Wasepi	St. Joseph	MI		20:47–21:07	10.75 mi (17.30 km)	450 yd (410 m)
EF2	See section on this tornado – Ten people were injured. This was the second tornado to be produced by the Southwest Michigan supercell.						
EF3	SSE of Athens to Union City	Branch	MI		21:33–21:42	5.23 mi (8.42 km)	500 yd (460 m)
EF3	3 deaths – See article on this tornado – Twelve people were injured. This was the third and strongest tornado to be produced by the Southwest Michigan supercell.						
EF0	NE of Tekonsha to W of Homer	Calhoun	MI		21:58–22:03	2.75 mi (4.43 km)	125 yd (114 m)
EF0	This tornado began in a rural area, uprooting several trees and snapping some weakened trunks. Minor structural damage occurred along the path, including a chicken coop that lost its roof and a farm outbuilding that had some walls collapse, with metal roofing scattered downwind. Tree damage continued intermittently as the tornado moved along, with additional uprooted trees near the end of the path before the tornado dissipated. This was the fourth and final tornado produced by the Southwest Michigan supercell.						
EF1	N of Bristow	Creek	OK		23:18–23:32	6.2 mi (10.0 km)	270 yd (250 m)
EF1	This tornado touched down northwest of Bristow, destroying a single-wide mobile home and an outbuilding shortly after forming. As it moved northeast, it uprooted trees and snapped large limbs while crossing SH-16. The tornado then struck an industrial site near SH-48, collapsing overhead doors and tearing sections of roofing from two metal buildings. Continuing northeast, it caused additional tree damage before dissipating north of SH-66.						
EF0	ENE of Little	Seminole	OK		00:19	0.2 mi (0.32 km)	20 yd (18 m)
EF0	A storm chaser observed this brief tornado that caused no damage.						
EF1	Northern Tulsa	Osage, Tulsa	OK		00:24–00:34	6 mi (9.7 km)	600 yd (550 m)
EF1	This tornado developed in a residential area and moved northeast, damaging numerous homes, tearing portions of roofing from an apartment complex, and uprooting trees while it also snapped many large tree limbs. As it continued through neighborhoods, additional homes were damaged, and tree damage remained widespread. After crossing into Tulsa County, the tornado caused further residential damage and continued snapping large limbs before moving across the Gilcrease Expressway. The tornado intensified as it approached a commercial area, where an office building and the Tulsa Technology Center were severely damaged, and many trees were snapped or uprooted. The tornado then moved north-northeast, damaging additional homes and mobile homes while continuing to snap large tree limbs before dissipating shortly afterward.						
EF1	W of Owasso	Tulsa	OK		00:38–00:41	2 mi (3.2 km)	180 yd (160 m)
EF1	This tornado developed and uprooted a tree as it crossed a street before moving through a neighborhood. Several homes sustained damage, while light poles were blown down, and large tree limbs were snapped. The tornado continued along its path, knocking down power poles and causing additional tree damage. It also damaged several outbuildings before lifting.						
EF0	NW of IXL to N of Mason	Okfuskee	OK		00:38–00:45	5 mi (8.0 km)	160 yd (150 m)
EF0	This weak tornado damaged the roofs of two mobile homes and downed tree branches in the vicinity of SH-48.						
EF2	E of Collinsville to S of Oologah	Rogers	OK		00:55–01:02	4.7 mi (7.6 km)	150 yd (140 m)
EF2	This strong, high-end EF2 tornado developed over a heavily wooded area and moved east-northeast. The tornado crossed the Caney River, destroying one home and damaging several others south of the river while rolling and severely damaging a large RV. Numerous trees were snapped, and several outbuildings were damaged in the area. The tornado then continued through additional wooded terrain, crossing the Caney River again before snapping large tree limbs and power poles before eventually dissipating.						
EF3	Western Beggs to N of Winchester	Okmulgee	OK		01:17–01:29	6.8 mi (10.9 km)	950 yd (870 m)
EF3	2 deaths – This intense and deadly tornado first touched down in western portions of Beggs, and tracked northeastward before impacting the Beggs Public Schools campus. Beggs Middle School and Beggs High School suffered severe roof damage and the bus barn suffered significant damage to its roof and garage doors. The tornado continued northeast, snapping and uprooting trees as it approached US 75-ALT. After crossing US 75-ALT, the tornado destroyed several outbuildings before making a brief northward jog. After jogging back east-northeastward, the tornado reached its peak intensity and maximum width destroying a double-wide mobile home at a homestead, killing two people and injuring two others. A single-wide manufactured home was also destroyed, several single-family homes nearby sustained severe roof and window damage, and several vehicles were moved or tossed 20 yards (18 m) to 30 yards (27 m) from their original positions. A barn in the same area was completely destroyed, and several trees suffered extreme limb loss. The tornado then continued northeastward, tracking over US 75, lofting a metal shipping container across the highway and uprooting trees before dissipating a few miles south of the Okmulgee-Tulsa County line.						
EF0	Eastern Broken Arrow	Wagoner	OK		02:03–02:06	1.5 mi (2.4 km)	130 yd (120 m)
EF0	This tornado developed just south of the Muskogee Turnpike (SH-351) and moved northeast through nearby residential areas. Along its path, it uprooted several trees, snapped large limbs, and blew down large sections of privacy fencing. Several homes also sustained roof damage before the tornado dissipated.						
EF1	E of Broken Arrow	Wagoner	OK		02:05–02:08	1.6 mi (2.6 km)	300 yd (270 m)
EF1	This anticyclonic tornado moved through a residential area, damaging numerous homes and breaking windows while causing additional roof damage to houses farther along its path. Several outbuildings were also damaged, and many trees were snapped or uprooted with large limbs broken off before the tornado eventually lifted.						
EF0	NE of Iantha	Barton	MO		02:17–02:19	1.78 mi (2.86 km)	50 yd (46 m)
EF0	This tornado first touched down and overturned portions of irrigation pivots. It then destroyed an outbuilding, scattering roofing debris more than a mile downwind and embedding some rafters in nearby fields up to 200 yd (180 m) away. Several power poles were broken as the tornado continued along its path. The tornado then weakened and damaged another outbuilding, damaged some irrigation pivots and snapped a few tree branches before dissipating.						
EFU	SW of Inola	Rogers	OK		01:24–01:26	1.3 mi (2.1 km)	150 yd (140 m)
EFU	This tornado was documented by a storm chaser as it remained over open country.						
EF1	Inola to W of Chouteau	Rogers, Mayes	OK		01:29–01:41	6.6 mi (10.6 km)	350 yd (320 m)
EF1	This tornado developed over the southern portion of Inola and moved northeast across the east side of town, tearing part of the roof from one home, causing minor damage to several others, and snapping many large tree limbs. Continuing northeast, it damaged another home’s roof and blew down trees before uprooting additional trees as it progressed through nearby rural areas. The tornado then crossed US 412, where it removed part of the roof from another home. After moving into Mayes County, it snapped large tree limbs and blew down several power poles before continuing across open countryside and eventually lifting.						
EFU	SE of Grove	Delaware	OK		02:55–02:56	0.5 mi (0.80 km)	150 yd (140 m)
EFU	A tornado was observed that caused no known damage.						
EF0	Northern Shawnee, KS to Western Kansas City, MO	Johnson (KS), Wyandotte (KS), Jackson (MO)	KS, MO		05:34–05:45	7.87 mi (12.67 km)	50 yd (46 m)
EF0	This weak tornado, which was embedded in a squall line, caused primarily tree damage with some structural damage also being noted.						

=== March 7 event ===
List of confirmed tornadoes – Saturday, March 7, 2026
EF#	Location	County / Parish	State	Start Coord.	Time (UTC)	Path length	Max width
EF2	N of Prospect	Marion	TX		09:09–09:14	3.02 mi (4.86 km)	233 yd (213 m)
EF2	This strong, low-end EF2 tornado touched down just west of US 59, initially snapping several hardwood tree trunks. As it moved east, a home was damaged by a fallen tree, and a nearby barn was completely destroyed, leaving only its wooden frame, while debris was scattered onto the highway. Just east of US 59, another home was shifted several feet from its foundation, and large hardwood trees were uprooted onto a nearby shed. As the tornado continued northeast, another residence sustained damage, a backyard shed was destroyed, vehicles were damaged, and a camper was tossed into another shed, injuring two occupants. The tornado continued east-northeast, snapping and uprooting numerous trees before entering another residential area where several roofs were damaged, outbuildings and barns were heavily damaged, and powerlines were downed. The tornado weakened as it moved away from the area, crossing Scotts Bayou and causing additional tree damage before dissipating shortly afterward.						
EF2	W of Willisville to SW of Rosston	Nevada	AR		11:37–11:45	2.73 mi (4.39 km)	345 yd (315 m)
EF2	A strong, mid-range EF2 tornado first caused damage just south of AR 32, where multiple large trees were brought down near an open field. After briefly moving through the field, the tornado crossed AR 32, where more widespread tree damage was noted. More significant damage occurred in a nearby rural area where numerous structures were impacted, including a single-wide residence that was lifted from its foundation, thrown approximately 100 ft (30 m), and completely destroyed. One injury occurred there. The tornado then continued through another wooded area, destroying a small garage or storage unit while also downing several large trees. As it moved farther along its path, the tornado caused additional tree damage before weakening, with only sporadic damage noted in open terrain before it lifted.						
EF0	NE of Symsonia	Graves	KY		15:47–15:50	0.67 mi (1.08 km)	10 yd (9.1 m)
EF0	This very narrow, high-end EF0 tornado damaged the roofs of metal outbuildings and inflicted some other minor structural damage.						
EF0	S of Stella	Calloway	KY		16:24–16:25	0.86 mi (1.38 km)	85 yd (78 m)
EF0	A brief tornado caused minor damage to trees and tree limbs. A wide section of vinyl fencing was heavily damaged, with wooden stakes pulled from the ground. A large goat shed was tossed, and shingles were also removed from a home.						

=== March 8 event ===
List of confirmed tornadoes – Sunday, March 8, 2026
EF#	Location	County / Parish	State	Start Coord.	Time (UTC)	Path length	Max width
EFU	ESE of Lyford	Willacy	TX	26.41°N 97.79°W	20:35	0.01 mi (0.016 km)	10 yd (9.1 m)
EFU	A landspout was documented by local media. No damage occurred.						

=== March 9 event ===
List of confirmed tornadoes – Monday, March 9, 2026
EF#	Location	County / Parish	State	Start Coord.	Time (UTC)	Path length	Max width
EF0	NW of North Johns	Jefferson	AL	33.4362°N 87.2483°W	00:40–00:47	5.83 mi (9.38 km)	200 yd (180 m)
EF0	This weak tornado initially uprooted several softwood trees and knocked down power lines before continuing through wooded areas where numerous more trees uprooted and smaller ones were snapped. Additional minor tree damage occurred farther along the path with a few uprooted trees and downed limbs before the tornado ultimately dissipated.						

=== March 10 event ===
List of confirmed tornadoes – Tuesday, March 10, 2026
EF#	Location	County / Parish	State	Start Coord.	Time (UTC)	Path length	Max width
EF0	N of Pontiac	Livingston	IL		21:49–21:51	1.07 mi (1.72 km)	175 yd (160 m)
EF0	This weak tornado removed the roof of a boathouse and damaged a garage and a fence. This was the first tornado produced by the Kankakee Valley supercell.						
EFU	E of Cayuga	Livingston	IL		21:57–21:58	0.25 mi (0.40 km)	10 yd (9.1 m)
EFU	A law enforcement officer reported this brief tornado, which was the second one produced by the Kankakee Valley supercell. No damage was reported.						
EFU	Potosi	Taylor	TX		22:00–22:02	0.25 mi (0.40 km)	200 yd (180 m)
EFU	A brief tornado was reported by a storm chaser.						
EFU	ENE of Dudley	Callahan	TX		22:18–22:23	0.96 mi (1.54 km)	200 yd (180 m)
EFU	A tornado remained over open land causing no damage.						
EFU	E of Dudley	Callahan	TX		22:30–22:33	0.93 mi (1.50 km)	200 yd (180 m)
EFU	This tornado was documented on video by a storm chaser.						
EFU	ENE of Val Verde Park	Kinney	TX		22:40	0.01 mi (0.016 km)	10 yd (9.1 m)
EFU	This brief tornado was photographed over open country. No damage was noted.						
EFU	Southern Kankakee	Kankakee	IL		23:18–23:19	0.54 mi (0.87 km)	10 yd (9.1 m)
EFU	The third tornado produced by the Kankakee Valley supercell crossed over trees and powerlines but inflicted no damage.						
EFU	SSW of Kankakee	Kankakee	IL		23:19–23:20	0.48 mi (0.77 km)	60 yd (55 m)
EFU	Three storm chasers observed this brief tornado that caused no damage. This was fourth tornado produced by the Kankakee Valley supercell.						
EF3	Southern Kankakee, IL to Lake Village, IN to W of DeMotte, IN	Kankakee (IL), Newton (IN), Jasper (IN)	IL, IN		23:21–00:39	34.22 mi (55.07 km)	1,550 yd (1,420 m)
EF3	3 deaths – See section on this tornado – This was the fifth tornado produced by the Kankakee Valley supercell; 19 people were injured.						
EF1	SW of Sun River Terrace	Kankakee	IL		23:33–23:38	1.31 mi (2.11 km)	150 yd (140 m)
EF1	This satellite tornado to the Aroma Park EF3 tornado formed in a field, producing swirl marks as it looped twice and tracked erratically southward. As it continued, sporadic tree damage occurred north of the Kankakee River before it crossed the river, made landfall on an island where it uprooted some more trees, moved off the island, and then made landfall back onto the south shore of the river, damaging more trees. The tornado then turned due south before eventually dissipating after uprooting a few more trees. This was the sixth tornado produced by the Kankakee Valley supercell.						
EF0	NW of Tuttle	Grady	OK		23:36	0.2 mi (0.32 km)	30 yd (27 m)
EF0	Chicken coops were damaged.						
EFU	S of Sun River Terrace	Kankakee	IL		23:36–23:37	0.09 mi (0.14 km)	20 yd (18 m)
EFU	Another satellite tornado to the Aroma Park EF3 tornado produced swirl marks in an open field, but caused no damage. This was the seventh tornado produced by the Kankakee Valley supercell.						
EFU	S of Momence	Kankakee	IL		23:43–23:44	0.15 mi (0.24 km)	20 yd (18 m)
EFU	Storm chasers recorded this brief anticyclonic satellite tornado to the Aroma Park EF3 tornado moving over an open field. No damage occurred. This was the eighth tornado produced by the Kankakee Valley supercell.						
EFU	N of Hopkins Park	Kankakee	IL		23:51–23:55	1.76 mi (2.83 km)	80 yd (73 m)
EFU	Another anticyclonic satellite tornado to the Aroma Park EF3 tornado took a unique track where it initially moved erratically north-northeastward over open farmland. The tornado then stopped, did a loop, and moved westward before gradually turning southward and ending just north of a residence less than 300 yd (270 m) southwest of where it had touched down. It left swirl marks in the fields, but no damage was reported. This was the ninth tornado produced by the Kankakee Valley supercell.						
EF1	SE of Centerville to SW of Toulon	Knox, Stark	IL		00:22–00:29	4.96 mi (7.98 km)	100 yd (91 m)
EF1	This tornado touched down and toppled a shipping container and caused tree damage near its starting point. As it moved eastward and intensified, it snapped additional trees and damaged several homes and outbuildings. The tornado continued east and crossed IL 78, where it damaged the roof of a home, broke windows, and caused extensive siding damage before dissipating.						
EF0	NW of Toulon to S of Modena	Stark	IL		00:30–00:37	6.09 mi (9.80 km)	50 yd (46 m)
EF0	A tornado caused sporadic tree damage.						
EF1	NE of Kniman to ENE of Tefft	Jasper	IN		00:43–01:06	10.46 mi (16.83 km)	900 yd (820 m)
EF1	This large high-end EF1 tornado touched down four minutes after the Aroma Park EF3 tornado dissipated. It first caused damage to a solar panel field and several power poles. As it moved east-northeast, it damaged a nearby farmstead before intensifying just south of Wheatfield near SR 49, where numerous homes sustained considerable damage, and many trees and power poles were downed. Continuing east-northeast across SR 49, the tornado damaged additional solar panel fields, farmsteads, trees, and power poles as it crossed SR 10 and passed through Tefft. The tornado weakened afterward and dissipated before reaching the Jasper-Starke county line. This was the tenth tornado produced by the Kankakee Valley supercell. 3 people were injured.						
EF0	N of Sparland to SSE of Magnolia	Marshall	IL		01:01–01:18	12.57 mi (20.23 km)	50 yd (46 m)
EF0	This weak tornado caused tree damage on both sides of the Illinois River.						
EF2	SW of Riverside to NW of Knox	Starke	IN		01:07–01:43	15.52 mi (24.98 km)	1,200 yd (1,100 m)
EF2	This large and strong multi-vortex tornado, which formed five minutes after the Wheatland EF1 tornado dissipated and prompted the issuance of a tornado emergency for Knox, developed west of US 421 and moved east-northeastward. As it crossed US 421, the tornado reached its peak intensity of low-end EF2, heavily damaging two large pole barns and destroying three empty grain bins with debris carried up to 1/2 mi (0.80 km) downwind. As it continued east-northeast, it damaged trees, center pivot irrigation systems, and several additional barns and homes. The tornado then crossed SR 39 just south of Jackson, producing further damage before moving across mostly open, unplanted fields. Additional damage occurred as the tornado crossed SR 8, where more structures and trees were impacted, as the tornado continued east-northeast before lifting just southeast of the Starke County Airport. This was the eleventh tornado produced by the Kankakee Valley supercell.						
EF0	S of Jackson	Starke	IN		01:35–01:36	0.7 mi (1.1 km)	150 yd (140 m)
EF0	This satellite tornado to the Knox EF2 tornado was confirmed by storm chaser video after the damage assessment uncovered an unusual damage path on the south side of the main larger tornado. It partially collapsed an outbuilding and sporadically uprooted trees as it approached SR 39 before dissipating just after crossing the highway. This was the twelfth and final tornado produced by the Kankakee Valley supercell.						
EF1	SW of Donnellson	Lee	IA		02:05–02:08	1.51 mi (2.43 km)	50 yd (46 m)
EF1	This tornado downed tree branches before strengthening enough to damage the door of a farm outbuilding and additional nearby agricultural structures. As it continued east, it continued to cause intermittent tree damage. The tornado then intensified further, destroying two farm outbuildings and snapping numerous tree trunks at the point of peak strength. After this, it quickly weakened, producing lighter damage before dissipating shortly afterward.						
EF1	SSE of Franklin	Lee	IA		02:26–02:31	2.12 mi (3.41 km)	50 yd (46 m)
EF1	A tornado began by downing tree branches before causing minor structural damage to a home, including fascia damage. As it moved into Wilson Lake Park, additional trees were downed, with some uprooted and a few trunks snapped. Farther along its path, the damage became more sporadic, consisting mainly of minor tree damage until the tornado lifted.						
EF1	W of Wever	Lee	IA		02:38–02:40	1.16 mi (1.87 km)	50 yd (46 m)
EF1	This tornado damaged a home by tearing large sections of shingles from the roof and blowing in the soffit on two sides, while nearby residences sustained minor roof damage. As it continued along its path, about 10 to 15 trees were snapped and an additional five to eight trees were uprooted. A power pole was also snapped before the tornado dissipated.						
EF1	Eastern Havana to NW of Topeka	Mason	IL		04:52–04:58	5.57 mi (8.96 km)	200 yd (180 m)
EF1	This tornado touched down on the far eastern edge of Havana near a cemetery, where it began snapping tree trunks. As it moved northeast, additional trees were snapped and several power poles were broken before the tornado approached the area near Topeka. The most significant damage occurred there when a horse barn was partially destroyed, killing a horse, before the tornado dissipated.						

=== March 11 event ===
List of confirmed tornadoes – Wednesday, March 11, 2026
EF#	Location	County / Parish	State	Start Coord.	Time (UTC)	Path length	Max width
EF1	S of Forest City to W of Green Valley	Mason, Tazewell	IL		05:06–05:15	10.06 mi (16.19 km)	50 yd (46 m)
EF1	This tornado caused damage to several irrigation pivots early in its path, overturning sections of the equipment and breaking branches from nearby trees. As it continued northeast, the tornado intensified, snapping eight power poles before quickly weakening and dissipating.						
EF2	ENE of Golden	McCurtain	OK		05:30–05:37	2.35 mi (3.78 km)	240 yd (220 m)
EF2	A strong tornado touched down and began by initially snapping trees and tearing shingles from a nearby home. As it moved east, additional trees were snapped or uprooted and a barn or shed sustained roof damage. The tornado then intensified, snapping and uprooting numerous trees before striking a residence where most exterior walls collapsed, injuring the occupant, while additional trees fell onto the structure causing further damage. Nearby properties also sustained damage to structures and trees, and another residence along the path lost portions of its roof while a neighboring barn suffered significant roof damage. Farther along, the tornado pushed a small outbuilding off its foundation and continued snapping and uprooting trees before crossing SH-3 and dissipating.						
EF1	SSE of Gilham	Sevier	AR		06:12–06:14	0.52 mi (0.84 km)	85 yd (78 m)
EF1	This brief tornado began east of US 59, damaging several large barns and snapping or uprooting multiple trees.						
EF1	Western Grafton	Jersey	IL		08:24–08:25	0.13 mi (0.21 km)	100 yd (91 m)
EF1	A very brief tornado caused significant roof damage to a local restaurant. The tornado then crossed IL 100 and caused more damage to a hotel and a hotel. The tornado uprooted a small tree and broke several tree branches before dissipating.						
EF1	SE of Moro to Midway	Madison	IL		08:50–08:52	1.64 mi (2.64 km)	25 yd (23 m)
EF1	A high-end EF1 tornado damaged several homes, grain bins and trees. One injury occurred.						
EF1	E of Williamson to N of Binney	Madison, Macoupin	IL		09:08–09:13	1.61 mi (2.59 km)	10 yd (9.1 m)
EF1	This tornado struck a solar farm, causing damage in and around the farm. It also inflicted minor roof damage to a home, leaned power poles and uprooted trees.						
EF1	NW of Darmstadt to SW of St. Libory	St. Clair	IL		10:05–10:08	2.63 mi (4.23 km)	300 yd (270 m)
EF1	This tornado damaged multiple outbuildings and trees.						
EF0	N of Yale	Jasper	IL		11:10–11:12	1.7 mi (2.7 km)	50 yd (46 m)
EF0	A barn was destroyed and some tree damage occurred.						
EF0	SW of Riverside to NE of Vera Cruz	Wells	IN		11:35–11:38	2.59 mi (4.17 km)	30 yd (27 m)
EF0	A weak tornado touched down in an open field and moved northeast, damaging a pole barn by removing its roof and leaving its walls leaning while debris from the structure was carried downwind, striking another nearby pole barn before being scattered into a nearby yard. As the tornado continued across mostly unplanted fields, drone imagery showed a narrow area of very light ground scouring and inflow patterns in the soil. The tornado then reached SR 116, where a tree was blown down across the roadway and struck by a vehicle, before continuing northeast. Near the end of its path, a small garage was shifted off its foundation when winds impacted the garage door, and the tornado dissipated shortly afterward near the Wells-Adams county line.						
EF1	E of Thornton to ENE of Kingsland	Calhoun, Dallas, Cleveland	AR		11:57–12:16	14.58 mi (23.46 km)	200 yd (180 m)
EF1	A tornado touched down east of US 167 southwest of Fordyce, where it began by snapping and uprooting pine trees. As it moved northeast it crossed AR 274 and AR 205, continuing to cause extensive damage to pine and some hardwood trees while a few outbuildings were damaged and several homes sustained minor roof damage. The tornado then crossed AR 8, snapping at least three wooden power poles. Farther along, trees were blown down onto AR 97, leading to a two-vehicle accident which resulted in no injuries. The tornado continued northeast across AR 189, producing additional tree damage before dissipating near the Saline River.						
EF0	S of Redkey to NE of Powers	Jay	IN		13:16–13:19	3.9 mi (6.3 km)	200 yd (180 m)
EF0	This tornado touched down west of SR 1, where it crossed the highway and snapped three power poles. Along the northern edge of the path, a barn sustained door damage while nearby trees were downed and a greenhouse was damaged. As the tornado moved northeast, it caused roof damage to a home and additional tree damage across several properties. Farther along, the roof of a pole barn was damaged and debris was carried about 350 yards (320 m) to the east. Near the end of the path, two animal barns lost portions of their roofs, with metal roofing from one structure blown into an adjacent field, before the tornado dissipated.						
EF0	NW of Anna	Shelby	OH		14:17–14:20	1.9 mi (3.1 km)	60 yd (55 m)
EF0	A tornado first caused damage where two barns were destroyed. Numerous trees in the area were uprooted or snapped, and a nearby residence sustained minor roof damage. As the tornado continued east, the roof was lifted from another barn, and several more trees were uprooted. Farther along, additional trees were uprooted, and a garage was damaged before the tornado approached I-75 and dissipated shortly beforehand.						
EF0	N of Anna	Shelby	OH		14:18–14:22	3 mi (4.8 km)	50 yd (46 m)
EF0	This tornado began by overturning an RV and damaging siding on two nearby properties before downing a pair of trees. It then crossed I-75, where two semi-trailers were blown over. Continuing east, the tornado blew down a tree, destroyed a shed, and tore shingles from a residence and garage. After moving across a field, it destroyed a large outbuilding and scattered debris widely across the property before dissipating.						
EF0	W of Saint Johns	Auglaize	OH		14:22–14:23	0.57 mi (0.92 km)	40 yd (37 m)
EF0	A brief tornado inflicted heavy damaged to three outbuildings along US 33.						
EF1	S of Gaither	Howard	MD		23:06–23:08	0.75 mi (1.21 km)	100 yd (91 m)
EF1	Approximately fifty trees were snapped or uprooted.						
EF0	Southeastern Eldersburg	Carroll	MD		23:14–23:15	0.26 mi (0.42 km)	75 yd (69 m)
EF0	A weak tornado occurred in Patapsco Valley State Park, snapping and uprooting numerous trees.						
EF0	SW of Rosetta	Wilkinson	MS		23:55–00:01	4.1 mi (6.6 km)	100 yd (91 m)
EF0	A high-end EF0 tornado damaged numerous trees.						
EF1	S of Coles	Amite	MS		00:09–00:12	2.39 mi (3.85 km)	200 yd (180 m)
EF1	Several trees were snapped or uprooted across heavily forested areas.						
EF0	N of Liberty	Amite	MS		00:27–00:37	6.52 mi (10.49 km)	150 yd (140 m)
EF0	This weak tornado displaced and damaged numerous trees.						
EF1	WNW of McComb	Pike	MS		00:48–00:50	1.77 mi (2.85 km)	375 yd (343 m)
EF1	This high-end EF1 tornado touched down south of MS 570, where it quickly intensified while moving east-northeast, destroying a wood-frame farm outbuilding and causing increasingly heavy tree damage. Numerous trees were snapped or uprooted as the tornado strengthened, producing a broad area of significant treefall before crossing MS 570, where extensive deforestation continued for a short distance. After this point the damage quickly became less severe, with fewer trees downed as the tornado ended.						
EF1	N of Summit	Pike	MS		00:48–01:00	7.88 mi (12.68 km)	250 yd (230 m)
EF1	A tornado touched down in a wooded area where a broad swath of trees was uprooted or damaged before it moved east-southeast and crossed I-55. As the tornado strengthened and grew in size, numerous trees were snapped or uprooted along US 51 and nearby areas. Continuing east, additional tree damage occurred near the Southwest Mississippi Community College campus before the tornado destroyed a cinderblock dugout at North Pike High School. The tornado then continued eastward causing more tree damage before weakening and lifting.						
EF1	Western McComb	Pike	MS		00:51-00:53	1.37 mi (2.20 km)	175 yd (160 m)
EF1	This tornado rapidly developed along MS 570, where it uprooted several trees, snapped the tops of tree trunks, tossed a golf cart approximately 70 yards (64 m), and caused minor roof damage to a couple of homes as it tracked along the state highway. As it continued southeastward along MS 570, additional trees were snapped or uprooted, and a convergent pattern of damage was observed in a nearby residential area before the tornado dissipated.						
EF1	ESE of Norfield to NW of Jayess	Lincoln, Lawrence	MS		00:57–01:08	10.46 mi (16.83 km)	700 yd (640 m)
EF1	This tornado caused widespread damage along its path, snapping or uprooting countless trees in some areas, damaging multiple outbuildings and utility poles, and inflicting minor to moderate damage to a mobile home and a site-built residence.						
EF1	E of Norfield to NW of Jayess	Lincoln	MS		00:57–01:01	8.01 mi (12.89 km)	700 yd (640 m)
EF1	This tornado caused widespread damage to trees and powerlines.						
EF1	Jayess	Lincoln, Lawrence	MS		01:04–01:12	6.17 mi (9.93 km)	1,000 yd (910 m)
EF1	Numerous trees were uprooted or snapped in large swaths by this high-end EF1 tornado. Multiple utility poles were either snapped or leaning, along with power lines downed. Several homes and outbuildings sustained roof and siding damage, while a single business and a poultry farm also had their roofs damaged.						
EF1	W of Liverpool to WSW of Fluker	St. Helena, Tangipahoa	LA		01:17–01:33	12.15 mi (19.55 km)	200 yd (180 m)
EF1	A tornado snapped and uprooted numerous trees before lifting just before crossing I-55.						
EF0	N of Kedron to S of Chesbrough	St. Helena, Tangipahoa	LA		01:29–01:42	8.94 mi (14.39 km)	175 yd (160 m)
EF0	A weak tornado snapped tree limbs and uprooted trees.						
EF0	S of Georgeville to W of Natalbany	Livingston, Tangipahoa	LA		01:31–01:38	7.51 mi (12.09 km)	50 yd (46 m)
EF0	Numerous large tree branches were broken.						
EF1	SSW of Prentiss to Bassfield	Jefferson Davis	MS		01:31–01:45	10.02 mi (16.13 km)	500 yd (460 m)
EF1	Several trees were snapped or uprooted, a few of which fell onto buildings and homes. Skirting was blown away from a mobile and some sheds had tin damage.						
EF1	SE of Lewiston to W of Franklinton	Tangipahoa, Washington	LA		01:38–02:02	15.29 mi (24.61 km)	200 yd (180 m)
EF1	This tornado snapped a power poles and snapped and uprooted several trees.						
EF1	SSW of Bassfield	Jefferson Davis	MS		01:41–01:44	3.06 mi (4.92 km)	400 yd (370 m)
EF1	A few trees were snapped with several more trees being uprooted. A few power lines were downed as well.						
EF1	S of Carson to Bassfield	Jefferson Davis	MS		01:41–01:44	2.9 mi (4.7 km)	250 yd (230 m)
EF1	A tornado began and moved east-southeast into Bassfield, producing damage that included numerous snapped and uprooted trees, downed power lines, and damage to a wooden building. A mobile home sustained heavy roof damage, and a vehicle was struck by a fallen tree. The tornado then weakened and dissipated shortly after crossing MS 35.						
EF0	N of Bunker Hill	Marion	MS		01:43–01:45	1.12 mi (1.80 km)	75 yd (69 m)
EF0	A couple of trees were uprooted before the tornado lifted just before reaching MS 35.						
EF1	E of Bassfield to SSW of Seminary	Jefferson Davis, Covington	MS		01:46–02:03	11.96 mi (19.25 km)	700 yd (640 m)
EF1	A tornado touched down just east of MS 42 and moved east, initially causing scattered tree damage as it progressed through rural areas. The damage intensified as the tornado continued, snapping and uprooting hundreds of trees while also causing minor damage to a few structures. After crossing into Covington County, additional trees were uprooted as the tornado tracked northeast before reaching MS 589, where a tree was uprooted and several large branches were snapped before the tornado dissipated.						
EF1	NE of Bassfield	Jefferson Davis	MS		01:48–01:52	3.16 mi (5.09 km)	400 yd (370 m)
EF1	A few trees were downed onto sheds. Several more trees were snapped and uprooted throughout the tornado's path.						
EF0	E of Loranger to SW of Osceola	Tangipahoa	LA		01:55–01:58	2.38 mi (3.83 km)	25 yd (23 m)
EF0	A weak tornado tracked through forested terrain, causing damage to trees.						
EF1	Southern Franklinton to NNW of Zona	Washington	LA		02:04–02:13	4.99 mi (8.03 km)	300 yd (270 m)
EF1	This tornado developed just west of Franklinton and moved southeast through the southern part of town, where it caused moderate roof damage to a floral shop and damaged a nearby business sign. As it crossed LA 16, the tornado caused minor roof damage to several homes and an apartment building while also blowing trees onto a house and a shed. Continuing southeast, the tornado produced its most intense damage after crossing south of LA 1072, where approximately forty to fifty small to medium pine trees were snapped within a forested area. Additional trees were snapped or uprooted as the tornado continued along its path before dissipating shortly afterward east of LA 1072.						
EF1	SE of Seminary	Covington	MS		02:10–02:11	1.09 mi (1.75 km)	400 yd (370 m)
EF1	A few trees were uprooted.						
EF0	Southern Blond	St. Tammany	LA		02:21–02:24	1.91 mi (3.07 km)	50 yd (46 m)
EF0	Tree branches were downed, rotted tree trunks were damaged and a few trees were uprooted.						
EF0	E of Blond to NNE of Waldheim	St. Tammany	LA		02:28–02:31	2.48 mi (3.99 km)	50 yd (46 m)
EF0	Minor tree damage occurred.						
EF1	SSE of Laurel	Jones	MS		02:33–02:39	4.22 mi (6.79 km)	400 yd (370 m)
EF1	This high-end EF1 tornado began west of MS 15, where multiple trees were snapped and uprooted before causing roof damage to two single-story homes and destroying a metal shed. As it moved east and crossed MS 15, it damaged a gas storage tank, destroyed another metal shed, and continued snapping and uprooting trees along its path. Farther east, additional trees were snapped and uprooted in rural areas before the tornado weakened and dissipated.						
EF1	SE of Sandersville to SSW of Eucutta	Jones, Wayne	MS		02:47–02:50	1.64 mi (2.64 km)	150 yd (140 m)
EF1	High-resolution satellite imagery showed a tornado track that caused damage to several trees.						
EF1	SSW of Eucutta (1st tornado)	Wayne	MS		02:50–02:52	1.38 mi (2.22 km)	250 yd (230 m)
EF1	A high-end EF1 tornado began north of US 84 within Pleasant Grove, where several trees were uprooted around a pond. As it moved east, it continued snapping and uprooting trees before merging with the other 0250 UTC tornado, producing a broader swath of significant tree damage where numerous trees were snapped and uprooted across a wide area. The tornado then continued northeast as the dominant circulation and struck several chicken farms, tearing away large sections of roof paneling from the buildings. After impacting the farm structures, the tornado weakened and lifted shortly afterward, with no additional damage observed beyond that point.						
EF1	SSW of Eucutta (2nd tornado)	Wayne	MS		02:50–02:51	0.94 mi (1.51 km)	50 yd (46 m)
EF1	This tornado began just north of US 84, initially causing sporadic minor tree damage before strengthening and producing more concentrated areas of snapped and uprooted trees. As it tracked northeast, a clearer damage corridor developed with more significant tree damage visible across wooded areas. The tornado then continued northeast and merged with the previous 0250 UTC tornado, with the track likely ending shortly after the merger as the combined continued on.						
EF1	SE of Matherville, MS	Choctaw	AL		03:28–03:30	1.47 mi (2.37 km)	320 yd (290 m)
EF1	This tornado began south of US 84 near Isney, where it uprooted and snapped several trees as it moved across a rural area. As the tornado continued, it strengthened and reached peak intensity, snapping numerous softwood trees, uprooting additional trees, and damaging several buildings at a nearby chicken farm. The tornado then began to weaken as it moved back toward US 84, producing additional tree damage before crossing the highway and lifting.						
EF0	NNE of Janice	Perry	MS		03:32–03:33	0.36 mi (0.58 km)	150 yd (140 m)
EF0	A brief tornado caused minor tree damage in forested areas.						
EF1	SSW of Gilbertown	Choctaw	AL		03:38–03:39	0.12 mi (0.19 km)	30 yd (27 m)
EF1	An outbuilding was destroyed and several trees were snapped or uprooted.						
EF1	S of Gilbertown	Choctaw	AL		03:42–03:43	0.16 mi (0.26 km)	35 yd (32 m)
EF1	This very brief tornado crossed SR 17, uprooting and snapping trees.						
EF0	NNE of Merrill	Greene	MS		04:08–04:09	0.22 mi (0.35 km)	30 yd (27 m)
EF0	A weak tornado snapped some branches and uprooted a few trees within a forest.						
EF0	SSE of Bexley to W of Lucedale	George	MS		04:17–04:18	0.86 mi (1.38 km)	30 yd (27 m)
EF0	This tornado remained entirely within forested terrain, damaging numerous trees.						
EF0	E of Vernal	Greene	MS		04:23–04:24	0.22 mi (0.35 km)	30 yd (27 m)
EF0	A weak tornado snapped a few large tree branches and uprooted a tree as it crossed MS 63.						
EF0	N of Wilmer to W of Chunchula	Mobile	AL		04:49–04:53	2.39 mi (3.85 km)	30 yd (27 m)
EF0	This high-end EF0 tornado uprooted a tree and snapped several tree branches.						
EF1	WSW of Chunchula	Mobile	AL		04:53–04:56	1.55 mi (2.49 km)	110 yd (100 m)
EF1	Multiple trees were snapped or uprooted.						

=== March 12 event ===
List of confirmed tornadoes – Thursday, March 12, 2026
EF#	Location	County / Parish	State	Start Coord.	Time (UTC)	Path length	Max width
EF0	ENE of Chunchula	Mobile	AL		05:07–05:08	0.51 mi (0.82 km)	100 yd (91 m)
EF0	Minor tree damage occurred.						
EF0	W of Tillmans Corner	Mobile	AL		05:20–05:22	1.11 mi (1.79 km)	200 yd (180 m)
EF0	This weak tornado caused only tree damage.						
EF0	N of Grand Bay	Mobile	AL		05:24–05:25	3.34 mi (5.38 km)	140 yd (130 m)
EF0	A high-end EF0 tornado tracked north of I-10, inflicting damage only to trees.						
EF0	Irvington to S of Mobile	Mobile	AL		05:36–05:47	5.92 mi (9.53 km)	50 yd (46 m)
EF0	This weak tornado caused sporadic damage to trees along its entire track.						
EF1	NW of Atmore	Escambia	AL		05:53–05:55	0.62 mi (1.00 km)	80 yd (73 m)
EF1	This brief tornado touched down on the Poarch Creek Indian Reservation in a field near a gym, where it ripped apart a scoreboard, throwing the heavier half about 200 yards (180 m) while the lighter half was carried roughly 500 yards (460 m) into another nearby field. The tornado then struck the gym, lifting a significant portion of roofing from the west side while snapping a short power pole and depositing much of the roofing material into nearby netting. The tornado tracked east-southeast, snapping numerous small trees and knocking over several road signs. The tornado then weakened as it continued eastward, causing minor roofing and siding damage to buildings before uprooting a large oak tree and dissipating.						
EF0	S of Troy	Pike	AL		08:03–08:04	0.28 mi (0.45 km)	100 yd (91 m)
EF0	A very brief high-end EF0 tornado struck a housing area north of Spring Hill, where several duplex buildings sustained significant roof damage and insulation from one structure was splattered against an exterior wall. As the tornado crossed SR 87, additional duplexes sustained minor roof damage and a couple of trees were uprooted before the tornado dissipated.						
EF0	SW of Clayton	Barbour	AL		08:36–08:37	0.53 mi (0.85 km)	150 yd (140 m)
EF0	A tornado touched down and immediately damaged the roof of a metal outbuilding. It then crossed a nearby road and snapped or uprooted multiple trees. A nearby house lost several shingles and had most of the windows blown out on its front side along with trees on the home's property being snapped or uprooted. The tornado then weakened as it continued into an open field, where several large branches were broken along a tree line before the tornado lifted.						
EF0	ENE of Hatchechubbee	Russell	AL		08:46–08:48	1.53 mi (2.46 km)	100 yd (91 m)
EF0	Several trees were uprooted and some large tree branches were snapped.						
EF1	SW of Abbeville	Henry	AL		09:07–09:09	1.39 mi (2.24 km)	200 yd (180 m)
EF1	An outbuilding was overturned, the roof of a mobile home was significantly damaged, another mobile home was shifted off its base and a large swath of trees were snapped or uprooted.						
EF1	Newville	Henry	AL		09:09–09:17	1.97 mi (3.17 km)	387 yd (354 m)
EF1	A tornado touched down northwest of Newville and damaged the roof of a two-story business before moving through downtown Newville, where numerous trees were snapped or uprooted and several businesses sustained roof damage near the Seaboard Coast Line Railroad tracks. As it continued eastward through the town, additional trees were snapped before the tornado weakened and dissipated near US 431.						
EF1	Kinsey to S of Pleasant Plains	Houston	AL		09:18–09:28	7.1 mi (11.4 km)	200 yd (180 m)
EF1	This high-end EF1 tornado touched down in Kinsey, where a home sustained minor shingle damage. As it moved east, the tornado tore the roof off a small shed and snapped a nearby tree. Continuing into a nearby residential area, it strengthened, snapping and uprooting several trees. Near peak strength, the tornado lifted an outbuilding from its moorings and tossed it into a tree. The tornado then weakened, damaging an awning and later snapping the support posts of a large outbuilding, including repurposed telephone poles, which allowed the structure to shift several feet and topple a concrete structure inside before the tornado dissipated.						
EF1	S of Blakely to NE of Cuba	Early	GA		09:43–09:48	6.41 mi (10.32 km)	50 yd (46 m)
EF1	A tornado touched down and initially caused damage to oak and pine trees before flipping a storage shed and damaging a well-constructed farm equipment shelter. As it continued east-southeast, it severely damaged the roof of a business building that housed several large trucks when overhead doors failed and allowed the roof and part of the wall structure to be lifted and flipped over the rest of the building. Farther along the path the tornado produced scattered tree damage and then damaged the porch of a manufactured home while debris struck another nearby manufactured home. After another brief stretch of lighter damage, the tornado caused more notable tree damage in a wooded area before eventually dissipating.						
EF1	Forsyth	Monroe	GA		10:20–10:23	1.42 mi (2.29 km)	300 yd (270 m)
EF1	A tornado began in a neighborhood where two large trees were uprooted, bringing down power lines and causing outages, then continued east-southeast snapping and uprooting additional trees in nearby yards. As it approached SR 42, more trees were damaged and large branches were snapped before the tornado intensified and moved between residential areas and an orchard, where about ten pecan trees were uprooted and several others were snapped. Continuing southeast, the tornado uprooted or snapped additional trees throughout nearby neighborhoods, including several large trees in residential yards, while narrowly missing Mary Persons High School. The tornado then caused a few more instances of tree damage before entering a wooded area and dissipating.						
EF2	WNW of Marshallville to S of Fort Valley	Macon	GA		10:40–10:45	4.81 mi (7.74 km)	600 yd (550 m)
EF2	This strong tornado first touched down west of a pecan orchard, where numerous trees were snapped and uprooted as it moved through the grove. As it intensified approaching a nearby mobile home community, it destroyed four mobile homes, overturned another, and damaged several others while snapping many surrounding trees. One resident was thrown about 40 feet (12 m) from a destroyed home and two others were injured when another home was flipped and destroyed. The tornado then continued east toward SR 49, snapping and uprooting additional trees and ripping the tops off two large silos, scattering bricks and debris around the area. After crossing SR 49, the tornado continued through another pecan orchard where more trees were snapped or uprooted and three sections of a center pivot irrigation system were flipped. Farther east the tornado began to weaken, producing mainly sporadic tree damage before lifting.						
EF1	W of Macon	Bibb	GA		10:46–10:50	3.39 mi (5.46 km)	200 yd (180 m)
EF1	This tornado developed just west of SR 74 where several trees were snapped and uprooted before it crossed SR 74 and moved into a nearby neighborhood, damaging numerous homes with broken windows, blown-in garage doors, partial roof loss, and large sections of shingles removed. Continuing east, the tornado snapped and uprooted additional trees and knocked over a large electrical transmission pole after a falling tree struck it. The tornado then crossed I-475 and moved into a wooded area where more trees were snapped and uprooted as it continued east-northeast. The tornado then weakened and lifted as it approached another residential area.						
EF1	WSW of Warner Robins	Peach, Houston	GA		10:56–11:00	3.28 mi (5.28 km)	350 yd (320 m)
EF1	A tornado first touched down south of SR 96, snapping and uprooting trees before moving into a nearby residential area where several homes were damaged by falling trees, and one home had its garage door blown in along with siding and shingle damage. The tornado then moved east and crossed I-75, continuing to snap and uproot trees before damaging several metal buildings just east of the interstate as it tracked east-northeast across SR 96. Along the state route, numerous power poles were snapped on the south side while many trees were snapped or uprooted on the north side, and several nearby structures sustained roof damage, broken windows, and blown-in doors. The tornado continued east along SR 96, causing additional tree damage before weakening and dissipating.						
EF0	ENE of Pinehurst to SE of Unadilla	Dooly	GA		11:00–11:04	2.41 mi (3.88 km)	100 yd (91 m)
EF0	A small house had sections of its metal roof blown off and a center irrigation pivot was flipped.						
EF0	NNE of Calvary to SSW of Reno	Grady	GA		11:03–11:05	1.78 mi (2.86 km)	300 yd (270 m)
EF0	This tornado touched down just southeast of SR 111, downing and uprooting a couple of trees before quickly dissipating.						
EF0	Milledgeville	Baldwin	GA		11:25–11:28	3.56 mi (5.73 km)	100 yd (91 m)
EF0	A tornado developed just west of Milledgeville and initially downed several trees, including one that fell onto a vehicle. As it moved east, additional trees were blown down in a wooded area between a local elementary school and nearby athletic fields. The tornado then crossed US 441, where it damaged a canopy at a city public works building before continuing into Milledgeville and downing more trees, including one that fell onto a house. The tornado quickly weakened and dissipated before reaching the Oconee River.						
EF1	SE of Marion to S of Jeffersonville	Twiggs	GA		11:25–11:29	3.24 mi (5.21 km)	400 yd (370 m)
EF1	Numerous trees were snapped or uprooted.						
EF1	E of Rentz	Laurens	GA		12:00–12:02	0.83 mi (1.34 km)	250 yd (230 m)
EF1	A tornado first caused damage where a pine tree was knocked over into a roadway before it moved northeast and produced minor roof shingle damage to a home and broke large tree branches nearby. As it continued, the tornado snapped or uprooted around ten pine trees before striking a residence, pushing walls outward, pulling a wall loose from its nails, and throwing debris and cinderblocks more than 50 feet (15 m) while also uprooting a hardwood tree. A large chicken coop was destroyed and displaced about 30 feet (9.1 m) as the tornado moved through the property. The tornado then continued northeast across a field, damaging additional tree limbs and uprooting another tree near a reservoir before lifting.						
EF0	S of Dublin	Laurens	GA		12:01–12:04	2.57 mi (4.14 km)	350 yd (320 m)
EF0	A metal road sign was bent and numerous trees were either snapped or uprooted.						
EF0	NNW of Ridge Spring	Saluda	SC		13:18–13:19	0.45 mi (0.72 km)	100 yd (91 m)
EF0	A small suffered partial loss of its metal roofing and multiple trees were uprooted.						
EF0	NW of Martin	Allendale	SC		13:44–13:48	3.72 mi (5.99 km)	30 yd (27 m)
EF0	This weak tornado first caused damage near a church, where a few trees were uprooted before it moved northeast across a large field. As it reached another rural property, a well-built outbuilding had its roof torn off and several large pine trees nearby were snapped or uprooted. Continuing toward SC 125, the tornado struck a family farm, peeling tin roofing from four to five pole barns and garages while additional trees were damaged in the area. The tornado then reached a nearby residence where two very large trees were uprooted in the front yard and more tree damage occurred behind the home. The damage path ended shortly afterward in a wooded area where numerous hardwood trees were snapped or uprooted before the tornado dissipated.						
EF0	Northern Irmo	Richland	SC		13:52–13:54	2.22 mi (3.57 km)	100 yd (91 m)
EF0	A tornado produced minor damage as it moved east through residential areas, snapping tree limbs and causing siding and shingle loss on several homes. Continuing along its path, additional trees were damaged and more residences sustained similar minor roof and siding damage. The tornado maintained this pattern of scattered tree damage and light structural impacts through nearby neighborhoods before dissipating a park.						
EFU	SW of Irmo	Lexington	SC		13:53–13:55	0.54 mi (0.87 km)	25 yd (23 m)
EFU	A waterspout on Lake Murray made landfall and caused no damage.						
EF0	S of Bamberg	Bamberg	SC		14:24–14:25	0.21 mi (0.34 km)	25 yd (23 m)
EF0	One large pine tree was snapped and multiple other trees were downed.						
EF0	Western Jacksonville	Onslow	NC		18:16–18:17	0.14 mi (0.23 km)	20 yd (18 m)
EF0	This brief tornado caused damage to the roof and door of an American Legion building.						
EF1	W of Maysville	Onslow	NC		18:26–18:27	0.26 mi (0.42 km)	50 yd (46 m)
EF1	A tornado touched down near a farm where it heavily damaged a farm building, tearing away much of the roof, collapsing and removing barn doors, and peeling off siding while debris was blown into a nearby field, including a 2×4 that was driven into the ground. As the tornado continued along its path, it damaged a row of trees with several snapped in half before the tornado weakened and dissipated.						
EF1	Fairfield Harbour	Craven	NC		18:45–18:47	0.6 mi (0.97 km)	150 yd (140 m)
EF1	This tornado began along the shoreline of the Neuse River, where a large section of a well-built roof was torn away and thrown more than 100 yards (91 m) to the east-southeast while a nearby pine tree was snapped at its base and minor siding and trim damage occurred on nearby buildings. As it continued east, the tornado snapped a large pine tree roughly 30 feet (9.1 m) above the ground and uprooted several smaller trees while also removing shingles and causing minor siding damage to nearby homes. The tornado then moved through the surrounding neighborhood producing sporadic damage that mainly consisted of snapped trees and scattered loss of roofing shingles, with occasional minor siding damage, before the tornado weakened and dissipated shortly afterward.						
EF1	S of Vandemere	Pamlico	NC		18:56–19:06	1.57 mi (2.53 km)	150 yd (140 m)
EF1	This tornado began near the Bay River where several pine trees were snapped or uprooted and multiple small campers were overturned, with some trees partially debarked. As it moved east, additional clusters of trees were snapped or uprooted and a clear convergent damage pattern was observed through wooded areas. Continuing along its path, the tornado damaged three power poles by breaking their crossarms while snapping and uprooting more trees nearby. Farther along, the tornado caused significant damage to a residence when a brick exterior wall was blown inward and a sun porch was heavily damaged, injuring an occupant inside, while several additional trees were snapped in the surrounding area. The tornado then continued into a nearby field where minor siding and trim damage was noted on another home before the tornado dissipated shortly afterward.						
EF1	NE of Oriental	Pamlico	NC		19:03–19:05	0.32 mi (0.51 km)	150 yd (140 m)
EF1	A tornado began east of Whortonsville in a wooded area, where several trees were snapped or uprooted. As it moved east, it struck a residence where a large porch and a small portion of the roof were torn off and thrown roughly 60 yards (55 m), while nearby large pine trees were snapped or uprooted and minor siding damage occurred on the opposite sides of homes. The tornado then continued eastward, snapping additional trees before the tornado moved over inaccessible terrain where it likely dissipated.						

=== March 15 event ===
List of confirmed tornadoes – Sunday, March 15, 2026
EF#	Location	County / Parish	State	Start Coord.	Time (UTC)	Path length	Max width
EF1	NNE of Cabool	Texas	MO		20:37–20:39	0.26 mi (0.42 km)	100 yd (91 m)
EF1	Several trees were uprooted and two barns were destroyed.						
EF0	SE of Sterling	Howell	MO		20:48–20:52	1.95 mi (3.14 km)	75 yd (69 m)
EF0	This high-end EF0 lifted a donkey barn and snapped or uprooted multiple trees.						
EF1	Eunice	Texas	MO		20:55–20:59	2.43 mi (3.91 km)	100 yd (91 m)
EF1	A tornado damaged the roof of a barn and uprooted or snapped numerous trees.						
EF0	NNW of Hartshorn	Texas	MO		21:00–21:02	0.85 mi (1.37 km)	100 yd (91 m)
EF0	Numerous large trees were uprooted and some trees were snapped.						
EF1	NNE of Hartshorn to SW of Akers	Shannon	MO		21:03–21:04	1.43 mi (2.30 km)	250 yd (230 m)
EF1	The roof of a mobile home was torn off and large trees were snapped or uprooted.						
EF0	Southern Summersville	Texas, Shannon	MO		21:08–21:12	0.47 mi (0.76 km)	75 yd (69 m)
EF0	This tornado touched down south of Summersville, where multiple trees and large limbs were snapped or uprooted along its path. As it moved across the area and into extreme southern portion of Summersville, several structures sustained roof damage, including a barn that lost part of its roof and a building that had a metal roof torn off and blown away. Other nearby buildings experienced shingle damage before the tornado dissipated.						
EF1	N of Staunton to Mount Olive	Macoupin, Montgomery	IL		22:29–22:36	6.32 mi (10.17 km)	300 yd (270 m)
EF1	This tornado touched down, uprooting trees and causing minor damage to barns. The tornado then crossed I-55 destroying a barn and uprooting more trees. As the tornado entered Mount Olive it caused roof damage to multiple structures and additional tree damage before dissipating.						
EF0	E of Ames to WNW of Baldwin	Monroe, Randolph	IL		22:35–22:43	8.71 mi (14.02 km)	160 yd (150 m)
EF0	The roofs of several farm outbuildings were damaged and one large outbuilding was collapsed. A church's roof was torn off and several trees were damaged as well.						
EF1	NW of Walshville to W of Hillsboro	Montgomery	IL		22:38–22:43	7.06 mi (11.36 km)	300 yd (270 m)
EF1	A tornado snapped wooden power poles, inflicted minor damage to farm outbuildings, and snapped or uprooted trees.						
EF1	Minturn to WNW of Sedgwick	Lawrence	AR		22:43–22:53	10.41 mi (16.75 km)	200 yd (180 m)
EF1	This tornado touched down, damaging several power poles before moving northeast across farmland where additional power infrastructure was impacted. As it entered Minturn, numerous trees were snapped or uprooted and a few mobile homes sustained roof damage. The tornado then crossed AR 367, uprooting more trees before continuing across open farmland where it caused minor roof damage to a barn. Farther along its path, additional trees and power poles were downed on both sides of I-57 before the tornado weakened and lifted.						
EF1	Northeastern Hillsboro to W of Irving	Montgomery	IL		22:47–22:51	3.64 mi (5.86 km)	300 yd (270 m)
EF1	This tornado caused heavy damage to a barn and uprooted trees.						
EF1	New Athens	St. Clair	IL		22:47–22:48	0.58 mi (0.93 km)	225 yd (206 m)
EF1	This tornado touched down in New Athens, initially breaking windows at a local shop and damaging the roof of a warehouse. It then tracked east-northeast through town, causing varying degrees of roof damage to multiple homes before weakening and dissipating just east of the Canadian National Railway.						
EF1	Lodi	Wayne	MO		22:51–22:53	1.65 mi (2.66 km)	125 yd (114 m)
EF1	This brief tornado damaged several trees and barns in and east of Lodi.						
EF1	SW of Witt to Colaton to Western Nokomis	Montgomery	IL		22:55–23:02	7.84 mi (12.62 km)	500 yd (460 m)
EF1	The tornado began by blowing over a farm auger and lofted debris nearly a half mile before striking Witt, where it damaged multiple roofs and trees and carried away a carport. It continued along IL 16 into Coalton, where it nearly completely removed the roof of a mobile home. The tornado then turned north and entered the western portions of Nokomis, where damage was primarily to trees, although an outdoor football scoreboard was blown over and portions of the Nokomis High School roof were torn away. The tornado lifted on the northwest side of the city.						
EF0	N of Walnut Corner to NNE of Light	Greene	AR		22:58–23:03	4.48 mi (7.21 km)	100 yd (91 m)
EF0	A tornado began just south of US 412, where it damaged a grain bin and snapped a few trees before continuing east-northeast and damaging a camper. As it continued to moved along, it caused damage to an outbuilding and produced additional tree damage at a nearby intersection. The tornado then continued a short distance farther, causing a few more instances of tree damage before lifting shortly afterward.						
EFU	SW of Stuttgart	Arkansas	AR		23:02–23:09	2.36 mi (3.80 km)	50 yd (46 m)
EFU	Multiple storm spotters recorded a tornado that occurred in an open field, causing no damage.						
EF1	Eastern Nokomis to Rosamond to Pana	Montgomery, Christian	IL		23:02–23:16	13.13 mi (21.13 km)	225 yd (206 m)
EF1	A tornado began on the east side of Nokomis, producing widespread tree damage before tracking northeast along IL 16 past Ohlman, where older farm outbuildings were collapsed and debris was lofted well downstream. After entering Christian County, the tornado caused additional roof and tree damage in Rosamond before curving east into Pana, where several large trees were snapped and uprooted before it dissipated.						
EF0	Beech Grove	Greene	AR		23:07–23:10	2.19 mi (3.52 km)	100 yd (91 m)
EF0	A weak tornado began along AR 34, where it damaged the roof of a metal outbuilding and a nearby residence while also causing some tree branch damage. As it moved east, it produced additional tree damage and caused minor damage to a barn before entering a wooded area and dissipating.						
EF1	Southern Lafe	Greene	AR		23:12–23:15	2.99 mi (4.81 km)	150 yd (140 m)
EF1	A tornado touched down southwest of Lafe in a wooded area, where it initially caused tree damage before continuing northeast and snapping or damaging additional trees. As it moved along, a residence sustained minor roof damage and a small barn was destroyed before the tornado approached AR 135. After crossing AR 135, it damaged another barn just south of AR 34, with additional tree damage noted along the path. The tornado then continued a short distance into a wooded area north of AR 34 before lifting.						
EF1	Assumption	Christian	IL		23:18–23:20	1.41 mi (2.27 km)	80 yd (73 m)
EF1	A tornado touched down just southwest of Assumption and moved into town, where it uprooted and snapped numerous trees and knocked over a couple of power poles. As it continued through the town center, additional trees were snapped and roofing material was torn from a downtown building and blown into a nearby alley. The tornado then moved northeast out of town, causing a few more trees to be damaged before dissipating shortly before reaching US 51.						
EF1	WSW of Sedgewickville to W of Daisy	Bollinger, Cape Girardeau	MO		23:19–23:27	7.81 mi (12.57 km)	100 yd (91 m)
EF1	This tornado began just north of Route 72, where several barns and outbuildings were damaged, including structures that lost roofs, had walls blown over, and one that was completely destroyed. Numerous trees were uprooted and many large limbs were broken as the tornado moved east. After crossing into Cape Girardeau County, the tornado flipped a livestock trailer before continuing east, where additional tree damage occurred before the tornado lifted.						
EF1	NW of Rector	Clay	AR		23:24–23:26	2.04 mi (3.28 km)	130 yd (120 m)
EF1	A tornado touched down and initially caused tree damage by snapping and damaging several trees. As it moved northeast, it produced minor roof damage to a nearby residence and lifted portions of the roof on a metal outbuilding. The tornado then continued a short distance, causing additional tree damage before lifting.						
EF1	N of Ferrin to NW of Sandoval	Clinton	IL		23:29–23:31	4.18 mi (6.73 km)	50 yd (46 m)
EF1	A grain bin, a farm outbuilding and trees were all damaged.						
EF1	W of Shawneetown	Cape Girardeau	MO		23:32–23:33	0.5 mi (0.80 km)	50 yd (46 m)
EF1	A few mobile homes suffered significant damage to their roofs, including one mobile home which was shifted off of its foundation. A couple outbuildings were also damaged.						
EF0	NW of Bethany	Moultrie	IL		23:37–23:40	2.04 mi (3.28 km)	50 yd (46 m)
EF0	An outbuilding was destroyed and trees were damaged.						
EF1	W of Lovington to SSW of Hammond	Moultrie	IL		23:42–23:48	5.3 mi (8.5 km)	50 yd (46 m)
EF1	A power pole was snapped, a tree was uprooted, a home and an outbuilding suffered roof damage and several large tree branches were snapped.						
EF0	E of Baird to Clarkton to W of Gideon	Dunklin, New Madrid	MO		23:44–23:50	2.94 mi (4.73 km)	75 yd (69 m)
EF0	A tornado touched down just east of Baird, where it overturned multiple center pivot irrigation systems before moving into Clarkton and causing roof damage to a state school, a convenience store, and several homes just south of Route 162. As it continued east, an outbuilding sustained damage and debris was scattered into a nearby field. The tornado then weakened and lifted shortly before reaching Gideon.						
EF1	Grand Tower	Jackson	IL		23:46–23:47	0.25 mi (0.40 km)	100 yd (91 m)
EF1	This brief tornado damaged roofs and awnings in Grand Tower. A few trees were uprooted and several tree branches were snapped as well.						
EF0	SE of Arthur to W of Chesterville	Douglas	IL		23:54–23:57	2 mi (3.2 km)	80 yd (73 m)
EF0	This high-end EF0 tornado damaged several outbuildings, one of which was lofted and tossed into a field, destroying it. Tree damage also occurred.						
EF0	Southern Reeds Station	Jackson	IL		00:02–00:03	0.25 mi (0.40 km)	50 yd (46 m)
EF0	A wooden fence was damaged and several trees were snapped.						
EF1	NE of Bourbon to SW of Tuscola	Douglas	IL		00:03–00:06	2.24 mi (3.60 km)	70 yd (64 m)
EF1	Numerous large pine trees were snapped and an outbuilding was damaged.						
EF1	SE of Ficklin to Tuscola to Northern Villa Grove	Douglas	IL		00:06–00:16	11.34 mi (18.25 km)	70 yd (64 m)
EF1	This tornado snapped branches off of trees before it crossed US 36 into Tuscola, where it would blow down fences and destroy a carport. The tornado later snapped power poles near Villa Grove, lifting shortly afterwards.						
EF0	Olney	Richland	IL		01:05–05:07	1.91 mi (3.07 km)	40 yd (37 m)
EF0	A weak tornado caused damage to trees and fencing throughout Olney.						
EF1	NNE of Kossuth to WSW of Corinth	Alcorn	MS		01:17–01:20	2.5 mi (4.0 km)	100 yd (91 m)
EF1	A tornado snapped and uprooted several trees, damaged power lines, fences, and caused minor roof damage to structures west of MS 2 before causing its most intense damage at a church along the highway, where the roof was partially removed and a few windows were blown out. It then moved east of the highway and dissipated over open fields.						
EF0	Northwestern Clarksville	Montgomery	TN		02:35–02:40	4.82 mi (7.76 km)	200 yd (180 m)
EF0	This weak tornado began in a neighborhood in Fort Campbell, where it removed shingles from roofs and snapped small tree limbs before moving east toward US 41, where it blew down an overhang at a car wash. Continuing northeast through additional neighborhoods and across Outlaw Airfield, the tornado caused scattered damage including downed trees, snapped branches, damaged fences, and minor impacts to homes such as shingle loss, siding damage, and bent metal fascia. After crossing the airfield, it uprooted a few trees on a nearby farm and continued into another residential area, producing additional minor roof and structural damage along with more snapped limbs. The tornado then moved toward the Tennessee-Kentucky state line and dissipated in an open field south of I-24, with no further damage observed beyond that point.						
EF0	W of Lewisburg	Logan	KY		02:45–02:46	0.78 mi (1.26 km)	40 yd (37 m)
EF0	A tornado began by uprooting and snapping several large trees before continuing northeast and causing additional tree damage. As it moved east, more trees were uprooted and a nearby residence sustained minor shingle damage. Farther along the path, the tornado intensified slightly, tearing the roof from a storage outbuilding and scattering debris, including wood planks that were driven into the ground in multiple directions. Additional trees were damaged beyond this point before the tornado rapidly weakened and lifted.						
EF0	SSW of Dimple to W of Needmore	Butler	KY		02:59–03:04	4.64 mi (7.47 km)	50 yd (46 m)
EF0	A tornado first caused damage south of Dimple where it lifted the roof off a storage outbuilding and lofted it into nearby trees while also snapping and twisting trees in multiple directions. As it moved northeast, it crossed KY 79, where additional tree damage occurred on either side of the route. Continuing onward, the tornado damaged several mobile homes, destroying a shed that was carried into a nearby field, shifting one mobile home on its foundation, and tearing the roof from another and depositing it roughly a 0.1 miles (0.16 km). The tornado then struck a farm where another outbuilding lost its roof, which was split apart and scattered in different directions over nearby equipment and fields, while isolated trees were also uprooted. After crossing a creek, the tornado snapped several large tree branches before the damage quickly diminished and the tornado lifted.						
EF1	N of Caneyville to NNE of Hardin Springs	Grayson, Breckinridge, Hardin	KY		03:04–03:22	17.22 mi (27.71 km)	300 yd (270 m)
EF1	This tornado began near Caneyville, where it produced tree damage near KY 79 before moving northeast and causing damage to farmsteads, including multiple outbuildings with roofs peeled off and debris driven into nearby homes, along with minor roof damage to residences. As it continued, it crossed KY 54, producing additional tree damage and destroying rooftops of farm structures, with debris lofted into nearby trees and fields. Farther along, the tornado intensified and caused complete destruction of several hilltop outbuildings, drove wood planks into the ground, and produced significant tree damage. The tornado then continued northeast, uprooting more trees and crossing Rough River Lake multiple times, causing additional structural and tree damage along the Grayson-Breckinridge county line. Near the end of its path, it snapped several branches off of trees before lifting.						
EF1	W of Riverside	Warren	KY		03:06–03:09	2.22 mi (3.57 km)	40 yd (37 m)
EF1	A tornado first caused damage in a rural area where a residence had minor shingle damage while several farm outbuildings sustained significant roof damage, including one barn whose roof was lofted away and debris such as wooden planks was driven into the ground. As it moved northeast, additional outbuildings on higher terrain lost roofing. The tornado then impacted another residence, lifting a carport awning while nearby trees were damaged. Continuing northeast, several trees were snapped and a barn lost roofing material and was shifted and left leaning, with its debris scattered. Farther along, the tornado caused more substantial damage at another property where a home and outbuildings were damaged, a barn was destroyed, and a zero-turn mower was lifted and placed onto a shed roof, while debris was thrown into a nearby field and wood pieces were embedded in the ground. The tornado then moved into open land where it ultimately ended.						
EF1	Mount Pleasant to Columbia to S of Spring Hill	Maury	TN		03:06–03:25	16.28 mi (26.20 km)	500 yd (460 m)
EF1	This tornado began along US 43 in Mount Pleasant, where numerous trees were uprooted or had limbs broken and several homes and barns lost sections of metal roofing. As it moved northeast, additional tree damage occurred before the tornado entered Columbia, where neighborhoods and the campus of Columbia State Community College experienced frequent tree damage along with minor structural damage to homes including siding, shingles, and metal fascia. On the college campus, one building sustained roof damage and fencing around the ball fields was damaged. Continuing northeast into an industrial area near the Duck River, the tornado uprooted or snapped many trees while several buildings lost metal roofing and one large metal building had part of its south-facing wall collapse. The tornado then moved back into residential areas where scattered trees were downed and additional minor damage to roofing and siding occurred before the tornado weakened and dissipated just before reaching Spring Hill.						
EF1	E of Constantine	Hardin	KY		03:24–03:28	3.85 mi (6.20 km)	100 yd (91 m)
EF1	A tornado began in a wooded area south of Garfield and quickly produced significant damage to a residence, where part of the roof was removed above the garage and living space, debris was driven back into the structure, and wood pieces were impaled into the ground, with mud splatter. As it moved north-northeast, it caused additional damage through forested areas and into a cemetery, then produced further structural damage to buildings along its path. The tornado continued through wooded terrain, leaving a visible damage path before it dissipated.						
EF1	WNW of Howe Valley to W of Radcliff	Hardin, Meade	KY		03:29–03:42	13.05 mi (21.00 km)	200 yd (180 m)
EF1	A tornado started in a heavily forested area, where initial damage was limited to trees before it crossed into open areas and caused its first structural impacts by damaging barns, including one that lost its roof which was thrown into a nearby wooded area. As it continued, additional structural damage occurred before it crossed into Meade County, where a large tree fell onto a house. The tornado then made a leftward turn to the north and caused further damage to buildings and trees near KY 313, followed by additional tree and minor residential damage. Continuing across open fields, it caused significant damage to a farm where multiple buildings were heavily impacted and roofs were lofted across the area before the tornado dissipated just before tracking into Fort Knox.						
EF1	Lexington, AL to Southern Minor Hill, TN	Lauderdale (AL), Lawrence (TN), Giles (TN)	AL, TN		03:48–04:04	14.53 mi (23.38 km)	400 yd (370 m)
EF1	This tornado touched down in an open field south of SR 64 in Lexington, where it slid an outdoor structure off its cinder blocks while snapping support posts and uprooting trees. As it moved northeast toward the city center, it caused minor roof damage to several buildings before uprooting numerous trees along SR 64. Continuing northeast, the tornado crossed a county highway, snapping additional trees, damaging home siding, collapsing small open structures, and blowing in a garage door as it moved toward the Alabama-Tennessee state line. After crossing into Tennessee, the tornado intensified as it struck Bonnertown, where many residences were damaged, several homes were heavily damaged, manufactured homes were shifted off their piers, and a couple of mobile homes were lofted or slid while remaining largely intact. Additional damage included removed shingles, missing awnings, carports thrown, and trees falling onto structures, while several farm outbuildings were destroyed and many trees were snapped or uprooted. Farther along the path, the tornado destroyed the roof of a chicken farm and continued causing widespread tree damage before weakening, where additional trees were downed, a few structures were damaged by falling trees, and some metal farm outbuildings collapsed before the tornado dissipated in southern Minor Hill.						

=== March 16 event ===
List of confirmed tornadoes – Monday, March 16, 2026
EF#	Location	County / Parish	State	Start Coord.	Time (UTC)	Path length	Max width
EF1	SW of Albany	Clinton	KY		05:35–05:37	1.26 mi (2.03 km)	200 yd (180 m)
EF1	This tornado first caused damage to a line of cedar trees, with treetops and branches twisted and thrown in multiple directions. As it moved uphill to a nearby farmstead, it intensified and completely shifted a barn off its foundation while lofting roof material into nearby fields. A nearby residence also sustained awning damage and wood planks were driven into the ground. Continuing northeast, the tornado snapped additional trees and leveled another barn while producing a clear convergent pattern in the damage. Farther along, a residence sustained roof and siding damage and the debris field extended up to US 127, beyond which no further damage was observed as the tornado dissipated.						
EF1	NW of Waynesboro	Wayne	MS		06:43–06:46	2.01 mi (3.23 km)	200 yd (180 m)
EF1	Numerous trees were uprooted and a few older outbuildings were either damaged or destroyed.						
EF0	S of Snapfinger	DeKalb	GA		10:11–10:15	2.77 mi (4.46 km)	135 yd (123 m)
EF0	A weak tornado downed, snapped and uprooted several of trees, one of which trapped a person inside their home.						
EF0	NW of Sunset Village	Upson	GA		11:00–11:03	3.02 mi (4.86 km)	360 yd (330 m)
EF0	This tornado began by snapping a few small pine trees before moving east and intensifying as it crossed a creek, where approximately twenty to thirty trees were knocked down or uprooted across farmland. Continuing along its path, it damaged a small outbuilding and produced additional tree damage before approaching SR 74, where more trees were damaged and a nearby home sustained minor structural impacts. The tornado then crossed another creek and uprooted more trees before continuing east, causing minor damage to trees and a small outbuilding, and then lifted.						
EF0	SSE of Mars Hill	Madison	NC		11:11–11:12	0.44 mi (0.71 km)	50 yd (46 m)
EF0	Several tree branches were snapped and a few trees were uprooted on either side of I-26.						
EF0	E of Mars Hill	Madison	NC		11:15–11:18	2.18 mi (3.51 km)	50 yd (46 m)
EF0	Numerous trees were downed, snapped or uprooted.						
EF0	SW of Yatesville	Upson	GA		11:20–11:26	1.65 mi (2.66 km)	100 yd (91 m)
EF0	A few trees were uprooted and multiple trees were snapped.						
EF0	Macon	Bibb	GA		11:58–12:05	1.94 mi (3.12 km)	320 yd (290 m)
EF0	This tornado developed in a residential area north of Payne within Macon, where it uprooted trees and caused minor damage to siding, carports, and gutters as it moved east-northeast through nearby neighborhoods. Several trees fell onto homes and vehicles, and a U-Haul truck was overturned, while scattered leaf debris and snapped tree limbs marked the path. The tornado continued intermittently until reaching the Ocmulgee River just east of I-75, where it dissipated and no further damage was observed.						
EF0	Charlotte	Mecklenburg	NC		13:39–13:42	1.44 mi (2.32 km)	25 yd (23 m)
EF0	A tornado touched down in a residential area where several small trees were snapped before it moved northeast and snapped additional large tree limbs. As it strengthened, the tornado peeled sheet metal back from a large industrial building and removed a significant section of roofing from a nearby warehouse while snapping several large pine trees behind the structure. The tornado then weakened as it moved into another residential area, where only a few small limbs were downed before the tornado dissipated.						
EF0	Northeastern Martinsville	City of Martinsville	VA		14:42–14:45	0.53 mi (0.85 km)	125 yd (114 m)
EF0	This tornado blew down two power poles and several trees were either snapped or uprooted. This is the first tornado to touch down in Martinsville since the NOAA started keeping track in 1950.						
EF0	W of New Windsor	Carroll	MD		16:02–16:05	1.68 mi (2.70 km)	150 yd (140 m)
EF0	A tornado touched down, initially snapping a small cluster of trees before moving northeast across open fields where it lifted and rolled part of an irrigation system about 100 feet (30 m). As it continued, it crossed MD 75 and MD 84, where its strongest damage occurred, toppling a couple dozen trees, shearing the tops off large pines, downing a power pole onto lines that briefly trapped a motorist, and causing near-total roof collapse of a nearby outbuilding. After this, the tornado weakened, snapping a few more tree tops northeast of MD 84 before the damage quickly ended and the tornado dissipated.						
EF1	SSE of Ridgley	Caroline	MD		02:26–02:29	0.9 mi (1.4 km)	250 yd (230 m)
EF1	A tornado began just east of MD 404, where it first caused minor roof damage to a residence while a nearby barn was completely destroyed with its roof blown off and walls collapsed, sending debris over a quarter mile into open fields. The tornado also flipped a horse trailer multiple times across a yard while also blowing out several windows of the home. As it moved east, the tornado produced significant tree damage, uprooting multiple large trees and snapping large branches. Continuing farther along its path, additional large branches were broken in a wooded area before a heavier section of tree damage occurred with several trees being snapped or uprooted. The tornado dissipated shortly afterwards.						
EF1	SW of Frederica	Kent	DE		02:48–02:49	0.7 mi (1.1 km)	75 yd (69 m)
EF1	Several trees were snapped or uprooted, one of which fell onto a shed, destroying it.						

=== March 26 event ===
List of confirmed tornadoes – Thursday, March 26, 2026
EF#	Location	County / Parish	State	Start Coord.	Time (UTC)	Path length	Max width
EF0	E of La Fontaine	Wabash	IN	40.6671°N 85.6698°W	23:05–23:06	0.27 mi (0.43 km)	30 yd (27 m)
EF0	This weak tornado touched down in a rural area and quickly moved toward a home, where it removed a portion of the roof and threw it to the northeast. A small outbuilding was tipped over and rolled northward before the tornado lifted.						
EF0	S of Banquo	Huntington, Grant	IN	40.6566°N 85.6373°W	23:06–23:08	1.51 mi (2.43 km)	200 yd (180 m)
EF0	A tornado touched down and moved southeast, where it caused extensive damage to an animal barn and a grain elevator while also damaging nearby trees and driving debris into the roofs of structures. As it continued, the tornado produced additional tree damage at a residence and caused more tree damage east of SR 9 before dissipating.						
EF1	ENE of Mount Gilead	Morrow	OH	40.5586°N 82.8073°W	00:43–00:45	1.53 mi (2.46 km)	75 yd (69 m)
EF1	This tornado began along US 42, where it caused extensive tree damage with numerous trees snapped and uprooted before moving southeast and producing more sporadic tree damage. As it continued, the tornado crossed SR 95, where it destroyed a large outbuilding and scattered debris 100 yards (91 m) to 200 yards (180 m) away. The tornado lifted shortly afterward.						
EF1	S of Kenton	Hardin	OH	40.6314°N 83.6109°W	00:46–00:47	0.13 mi (0.21 km)	75 yd (69 m)
EF1	A tornado touched down at the Hardin County Fairgrounds, where it first caused minor roof damage before snapping several wooden power poles and completely breaking a tree. As it moved across the fairgrounds, it intensified and tore large sections of metal roofing from one building while another structure had its concrete block siding blown out, leading to a partial roof collapse. An open-ended barn also experienced uplift, with large support poles shifted from the ground. The tornado then continued across the eastern side of the fairgrounds, snapping additional power poles and causing minor roof damage to more buildings before dissipating.						
EF0	SSW of Fredericktown	Knox	OH	40.4348°N 82.5922°W	00:58–00:59	0.07 mi (0.11 km)	20 yd (18 m)
EF0	A very brief tornado tore a portion of the metal roof of a barn off and lofted it southeast.						

=== March 31 event ===
List of confirmed tornadoes – Tuesday, March 31, 2026
EF#	Location	County / Parish	State	Start Coord.	Time (UTC)	Path length	Max width
EF1	SW of Machias	Cattaraugus	NY	42.396°N 78.547°W	19:43–19:46	1.4 mi (2.3 km)	150 yd (140 m)
EF1	Numerous trees were snapped or uprooted.						
EF1	SE of Chesterland	Geauga	OH	41.4926°N 81.3085°W	21:49–21:51	1.5 mi (2.4 km)	120 yd (110 m)
EF1	This tornado touched down and immediately inflicted significant damage to a large barn where the roof collapsed. The tornado then moved eastward and downed several large pine trees, including some that fell onto homes, causing minor roof and gutter damage. A power pole was also snapped in half along its path, and additional trees were knocked down as the tornado continued. The damage remained relatively localized and primarily consisted of tree and minor structural impacts up until the tornado lifted.						
EF1	SE of Hicksville to SW of Rosedale	Defiance	OH	41.2757°N 84.745°W	23:09–23:11	2.71 mi (4.36 km)	25 yd (23 m)
EF1	A large pole barn was destroyed, a roof was ripped off a newly constructed home and minor tree damage occurred.						
EF0	SW of Apple Creek	Wayne	OH	40.7293°N 81.8781°W	01:55–01:56	0.11 mi (0.18 km)	75 yd (69 m)
EF0	This high-end EF0 tornado caused localized damage along its path, including several trees that were uprooted or snapped, with some large branches driven into the ground. A carport awning was lifted and pushed across a home, knocking down a TV antenna and causing a chimney to collapse onto the roof, while additional damage included a blown-down fence and roof damage at another residence. An external propane tank was also damaged before the tornado lifted.						

== See also ==
- Tornadoes of 2026
- List of United States tornadoes from August to December 2025
- List of United States tornadoes in April 2026
