= Bogue Flower =

Bogue Flower may refer to:

- Bogue Flower (Eucutta Creek tributary), a stream in Mississippi
- Bogue Flower (Tallahatta Creek tributary), a stream in Mississippi
