= Matt Tolbert =

American baseball player (born 1982)

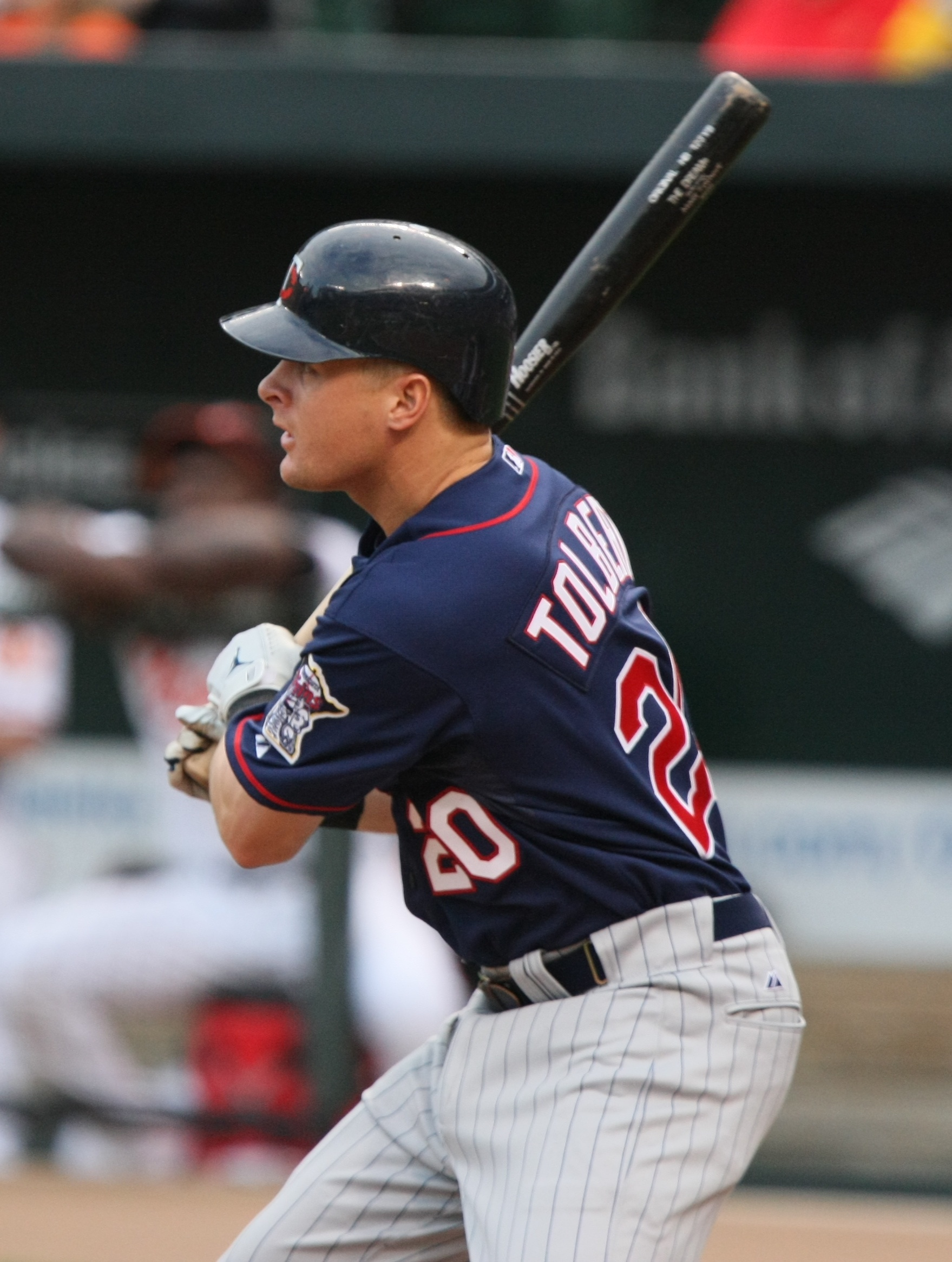
- Tolbert with the Minnesota Twins
- Infielder
- Born: May 4, 1982 (age 43); McComb, Mississippi, U.S.
- Batted: Switch Threw: Right

MLB debut
- April 1, 2008, for the Minnesota Twins

Last MLB appearance
- September 27, 2011, for the Minnesota Twins

MLB statistics
- Batting average: .230
- Home runs: 3
- Runs batted in: 54
- Stats at Baseball Reference

Teams
- Minnesota Twins (2008–2011)

Christopher Matthew Tolbert (born May 4, 1982) is an American former professional baseball infielder. He played in Major League Baseball (MLB) for the Minnesota Twins from 2008 to 2011. After graduating from Centreville Academy in 2000, Tolbert attended University of Mississippi for four years; he was later drafted by the Baltimore Orioles in 2003 and the Twins in 2004.

== Early life ==
Tolbert was born on May 4, 1982, in McComb, Mississippi, and grew up in Woodville, Mississippi, about one hour north of Baton Rouge. Tolbert attended high school at Centreville Academy, where he played football and track and field in addition to baseball. In 1998 and 1999, Tolbert's football team won back-to-back state football championships. During his senior season, Tolbert played running back and rushed for 2,561 yards on 326 carries. After graduation in 2000, Tolbert played baseball at the University of Mississippi in Oxford, Mississippi, for the Ole Miss Rebels. Tolbert spent his collegiate career playing shortstop and second base. He was named a Freshman All-American in 2002. The following season, Tolbert was drafted by the Baltimore Orioles in the 19th round (554th overall) of the 2003 Major League Baseball draft, but did not sign with the team. In 2003 and 2004, he played collegiate summer baseball with the Bourne Braves of the Cape Cod Baseball League.

== Professional career ==
=== Minnesota Twins ===
Tolbert was selected by the Minnesota Twins in the 16th round (481st overall) of the 2004 Major League Baseball draft. On March 24, 2008, it was announced that Tolbert had made the team's Opening Day roster, earning the team's last roster spot. He made his major league debut on April 1, 2008 against the Los Angeles Angels of Anaheim, appearing as a pinch hitter in the eighth inning and grounding out to third. Tolbert got his first major league hit, a single, on April 2, 2008, in the third inning off Angels pitcher Joe Saunders. On April 11, 2008, Tolbert had his first career major league RBI against Kansas City Royals pitcher Gil Meche. He played in 41 games for the Twins in 2008, batting .283 with six doubles, three triples, 6 RBI, and seven stolen bases.

Following the Twins' 2009 spring training camp, Tolbert was optioned to the Triple-A Rochester Red Wings. On May 6, 2009, Tolbert was called up from Rochester and became the starting second baseman.

Tolbert hit his first major league home run on May 21, 2009, against Chicago White Sox pitcher Jimmy Gobble. In the game, Tolbert went 3-for-6, scoring two runs and collecting 4 RBI. Tolbert hit his second home run on September 22, 2009 against White Sox starter John Danks.

After continuing to split time between the Twins and the minor leagues, Tolbert became a free agent on October 14, 2011.

=== Chicago Cubs ===
On January 30, 2012, Tolbert signed a minor league deal with the Chicago Cubs. He spent the entire season with the Triple-A Iowa Cubs, batting .240 with a home run and 13 RBI in 113 games.

=== Philadelphia Phillies ===
On February 6, 2013, Tolbert signed with the Philadelphia Phillies on a minor league deal. He played in 46 minor league games while spending most of his time with the Double-A Reading Fightin Phils. In those games, he hit .327 with 13 RBI. After returning to the Phillies organization in 2014, Tolbert ended his playing career during the season and transitioned to coaching. He was added to the coaching staff of the Williamsport Crosscutters, Single-A affiliate of the Phillies, in July 2014.
