= Bogue Flower (Eucutta Creek tributary) =

Stream in Mississippi, U.S.

Coordinates: 31.8201571°N 88.8108789°W

Bogue Flower is a stream in the U.S. state of Mississippi. It is a tributary to Eucutta Creek.

Bogue Flower is a name derived from the Choctaw language meaning "long creek" (the element "flower" in this context is a corruption of an Indian word). Variant names are "Bogue Flowers Creek" and "Little Flower Creek".
