= Eucutta, Mississippi =

Unincorporated community in Mississippi, US

Coordinates: 31°48′19″N 88°52′20″W

Eucutta is an unincorporated community in Wayne County, in the U.S. state of Mississippi.

== History ==
The community takes its name from Eucutta Creek, which flows near the site. A post office called Eucutta was established in 1835, and remained in operation until 1911.
