= Dudley, Texas =

- Unincorporated community
- Location within Texas Location within the United States
- Coordinates: 32°15′29″N 99°36′18″W
- Country: United States
- State: Texas
- County: Callahan
- Elevation: 2,021 ft (616 m)
- Time zone: UTC-6 (Central (CST))
  - Summer (DST): UTC-5 (CDT)
- Area code: 325
- GNIS feature ID: 1378232

Dudley is an unincorporated community in Callahan County, in the U.S. state of Texas. According to the Handbook of Texas, the community had a population of 25 in 2000. It is located within the Abilene metropolitan area.

== History ==
Dudley was founded in 1893. It was named for Nicholas M. Dudley, its first postmaster and storekeeper. The post office closed in 1912 due to a lack of growth in the area. The community had three stores and a church serving 35 residents in 1940. The local grocery store also served as a community center where locals played dominoes, croquet, and softball. The community once had three churches. Its population was listed as 25 from 1980 through 2000.

== Geography ==
Dudley is located on Farm to Market Road 1178 in western Callahan County.

== Education ==
Dudley had its own school in 1940. Today, the community is served by the Eula Independent School District.
