= Chunchula, Alabama =

- Census-designated place
- Location in Mobile County, Alabama
- Coordinates: 30°55′25″N 88°12′26″W
- Country: United States
- State: Alabama
- County: Mobile

Area
  - Total: 1.81 sq mi (4.69 km^{2})
  - Land: 1.80 sq mi (4.67 km^{2})
  - Water: 0.0077 sq mi (0.02 km^{2})
- Elevation: 174 ft (53 m)

Population (2020)
  - Total: 195
  - Density: 108.1/sq mi (41.75/km^{2})
- Time zone: UTC-6 (Central (CST))
  - Summer (DST): UTC-5 (CDT)
- ZIP code: 36521
- Area code: 251
- FIPS code: 01-14968
- GNIS feature ID: 2628585

Chunchula is an unincorporated community and census-designated place (CDP) in Mobile County, Alabama, United States. As of the 2020 census, its population was 195. It has a post office with the 36521 ZIP code. The community has one site listed on the Alabama Register of Landmarks and Heritage, the Chunchula School.

== Geography ==
Chunchula is located in northern Mobile County. U.S. Route 45 passes through the community, leading south 20 miles (32 km) to Mobile and north 12 miles (19 km) to Citronelle.

== Demographics ==
Historical population
Census	Pop.	Note	%±
1880	214		—
1890	258		20.6%
2010	210		—
2020	195		−7.1%
U.S. Decennial Census

Chunchula was listed on the 1880 and 1890 U.S. Censuses as a village. It did not reappear on the U.S. Census until 2010 when it was listed as a census designated place in the 2010 U.S. census.

Chunchula CDP, Alabama – Racial and ethnic composition Note: the US Census treats Hispanic/Latino as an ethnic category. This table excludes Latinos from the racial categories and assigns them to a separate category. Hispanics/Latinos may be of any race.
Race / Ethnicity (NH = Non-Hispanic)	Pop 2010	Pop 2020	% 2010	% 2020
White alone (NH)	96	89	45.71%	45.64%
Black or African American alone (NH)	109	99	51.90%	50.77%
Native American or Alaska Native alone (NH)	0	0	0.00%	0.00%
Asian alone (NH)	0	0	0.00%	0.00%
Native Hawaiian or Pacific Islander alone (NH)	0	0	0.00%	0.00%
Other race alone (NH)	0	0	0.00%	0.00%
Mixed race or Multiracial (NH)	4	4	1.90%	2.05%
Hispanic or Latino (any race)	1	3	0.48%	1.54%
Total	210	195	100.00%	100.00%

== Education ==
Residents are zoned to Mobile County Public School System campuses. Residents are zoned to McDavid-Jones Elementary School (K-5), Lott Middle School (6-8), and Citronelle High School (9-12).
