= Centreville Academy =

Segregation academy in Mississippi

Location
- Centreville, Mississippi; 31.0768351°N 91.0611015°W

Information
- Established: 19 January 1970; 56 years ago
- NCES School ID: 00736221
- Faculty: 24.3
- Enrollment: 357 (2016)
- Nickname: Tigers
- Website: www.catigers.com

Centreville Academy is a private PK-12 school in Centreville, Mississippi established in 1970 as a segregation academy. It serves 357 students from Amite County and adjacent Wilkinson County.

== History ==
At the end of the 1950s, as part of the Massive resistance to the desegregation of the educational system ordered by the Supreme Court in Brown v. Board of Education many white students were enrolled in newly-established segregation academies which included Centreville Academy. In the rush to open the school, classes were initially held at Centreville Baptist Church, along with other local White churches. As segregation faded in popularity most of these institutions changed their openly discriminatory policies and in 2016, the school had one black student.

== Athletics ==
The school offers the following sports:

- Football — MAIS class AA champions in 1976, 1979, 1989, 1991, 1998, 1999, 2007, and 2008. Class AAA 2010, 2015, 2018, 2019, 2020, 2023, 2023. under Bill Hurst, who has been coach at Centreville for more than forty years.
- Softball
- Track
- Basketball
- Baseball
- Tennis
- Archery

== Alumni ==
- Matt Tolbert - baseball player
