= Norfield, Mississippi =

- Unincorporated community
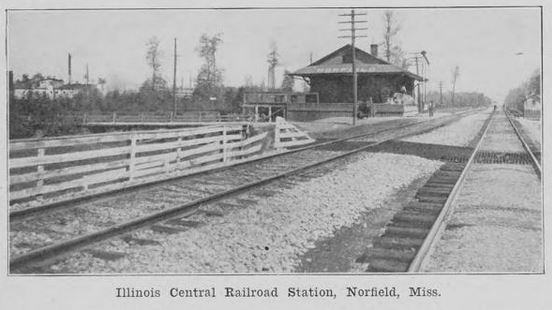
- Illinois Central Railroad depot in Norfield

- Location within Mississippi Location within the United States
- Coordinates: 31°24′28″N 90°28′02″W
- Country: United States
- State: Mississippi
- County: Lincoln
- Elevation: 407 ft (124 m)
- Time zone: UTC-6 (Central (CST))
  - Summer (DST): UTC-5 (CDT)
- Area codes: 601 & 769
- GNIS feature ID: 674932

Norfield is an unincorporated community in Lincoln County, Mississippi, United States.

== History ==
The community was founded in 1886 as a sawmill town. Norfield's name is a portmanteau of the surnames of Frederick Norwood and John S. Butterfield, who founded the Norwood-Butterfield Lumber Company. The sawmill in Norfield was the first sawmill in the southern United States to use a bandsaw to cut yellow pine. In 1900, the community had a population of 347 and was estimated to have a population of 700 six years later. By 1930, the community had the second-largest population in Lincoln County and had a theater, hotel, and golf course.

Norfield is located on the Canadian National Railway. The Norwood-Butterfield Company operated the Natchez, Columbia & Mobile Railroad, a standard gauge logging railroad that ran 30 miles east from Norfield. The railroad operated six locomotives.

A post office operated under the name Norfield from 1891 to 1953.

== Notable people ==
- Little Brother Montgomery, blues pianist, lived in Norfield as a young man

== Gallery ==
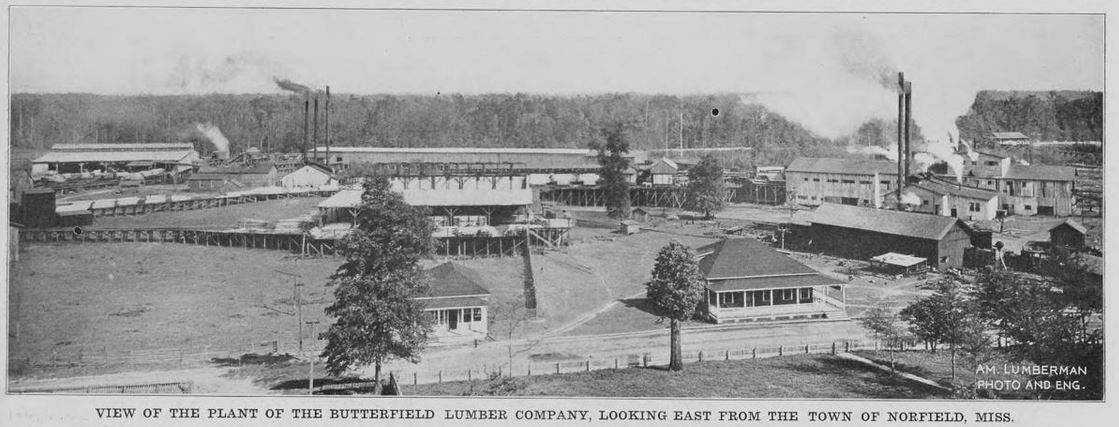
Aerial view of Butterfield Lumber Company mill

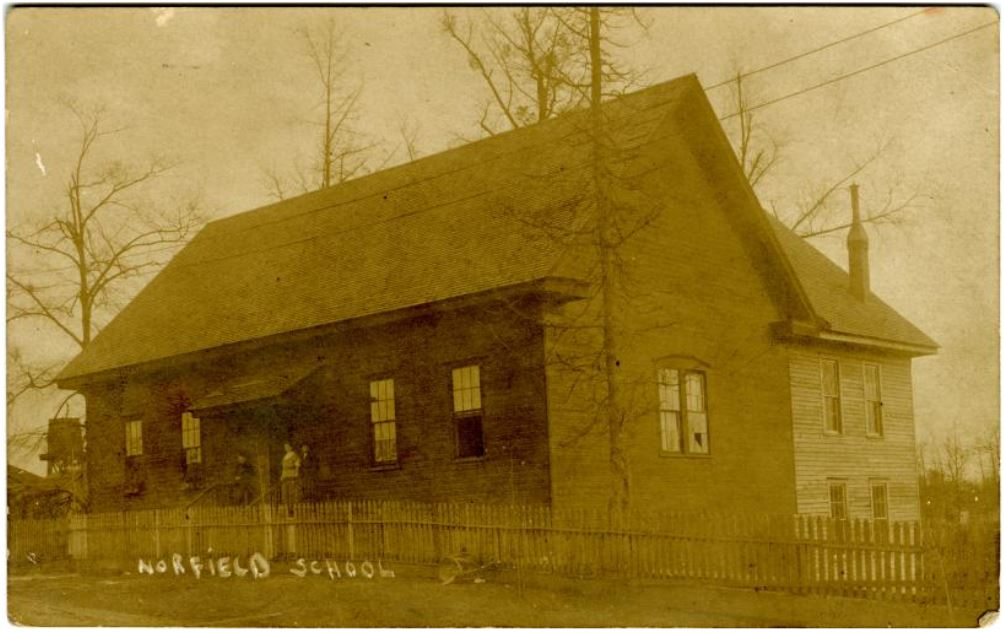
School in Norfield

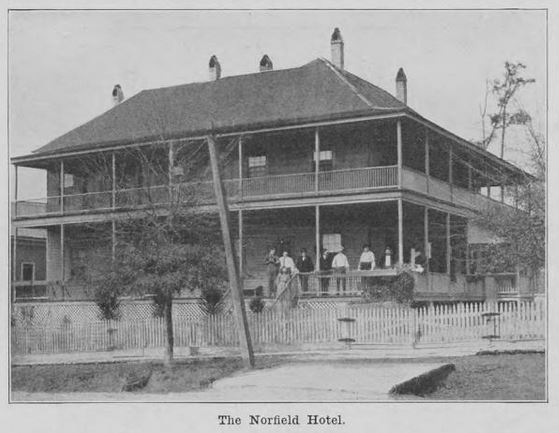
The Norfield Hotel in 1907
