= Reno, Georgia =

Unincorporated community in the United States

Coordinates: 30°46′26″N 84°17′32″W

Reno is an unincorporated community in Grady County, in the U.S. state of Georgia.

== History ==
A post office called Reno was established in 1911, and remained in operation until 1933. The community most likely was named after a local resident.

The Georgia General Assembly incorporated Reno as a town in 1913. The town's municipal charter was repealed in 1995.
