= Pleasant Plains, Alabama =

Unincorporated community in Alabama, United States

- Unincorporated community
- Location within Alabama Location within the United States
- Coordinates: 31°18′16″N 85°13′47″W
- Country: United States
- State: Alabama
- County: Houston
- Elevation: 282 ft (86 m)
- Time zone: UTC-6 (Central (CST))
  - Summer (DST): UTC-5 (CDT)
- Area code: 334
- GNIS feature ID: 125024

Pleasant Plains is an unincorporated community in Houston County, Alabama, United States.

== History ==
A post office operated under the name Pleasant Plains from 1885 to 1903.
