= Blond, Louisiana =

Unincorporated community in Louisiana

- Unincorporated community
- Location within Louisiana Location within the United States
- Coordinates: 30°35′51″N 90°06′04″W
- Country: United States
- State: Louisiana
- Parish: St. Tammany
- Elevation: 135 ft (41 m)
- Time zone: UTC-6 (Central (CST))
  - Summer (DST): UTC-5 (CDT)
- ZIP code: 70435
- Area code: 985
- GNIS feature ID: 560226
- FIPS code: 22-07905

Blond is an unincorporated community in St. Tammany Parish, Louisiana, United States. The community is located on Louisiana Highway 40 approximately 8 mi (13 km) north of Covington and six miles southeast of Folsom.
