= Prospect, Marion County, Texas =

Unincorporated community in Texas, US

Prospect
- Unincorporated community
- Location in Texas
- Coordinates: 32°50′29″N 94°21′59″W
- Country: United States
- State: Texas
- County: Marion
- Elevation: 322 ft (98 m)
- USGS Feature ID: 1378911

Prospect is an unincorporated community in Marion County, Texas, United States. It is situated on U.S. Route 59. By 1983, it had a church, a cemetery and a school.
