= Zona, Louisiana =

- Unincorporated community
- Location within Louisiana Location within the United States
- Coordinates: 30°44′54″N 90°04′52″W
- Country: United States
- State: Louisiana
- Parish: Washington
- Elevation: 125 ft (38 m)
- Time zone: UTC-6 (Central (CST))
  - Summer (DST): UTC-5 (CDT)
- Area code: 985
- GNIS feature ID: 541221
- FIPS code: 22-83650

Zona is an unincorporated community in Washington Parish, Louisiana, United States. The community is located about 13 miles (20.92 kilometres) west of Bogalusa, Louisiana, and near Enon and Willis.

== History ==
Zona was listed in 1917 as a Washington Parish community on the New Orleans Great Northern Railroad. Zona had a population of 250 where F. L. Sanford was operating a sawmill with a daily capacity of 50,000 board feet (120 cubic metres). The Zona School was a former white school located about 4 miles (6.4 km) west of Franklinton, off Louisiana Highway 16.
