= Rosedale, Defiance County, Ohio =

Unincorporated community in Ohio, U.S.

Coordinates: 41°17′28″N 84°41′25″W

Rosedale is an unincorporated community in Defiance County, in the U.S. state of Ohio.

The GNIS classifies Rosedale as a populated place. However, Rosedale was described as a ghost town by the Toledo Blade, as little remains of the original community.
