= Bogue Flower (Tallahatta Creek tributary) =

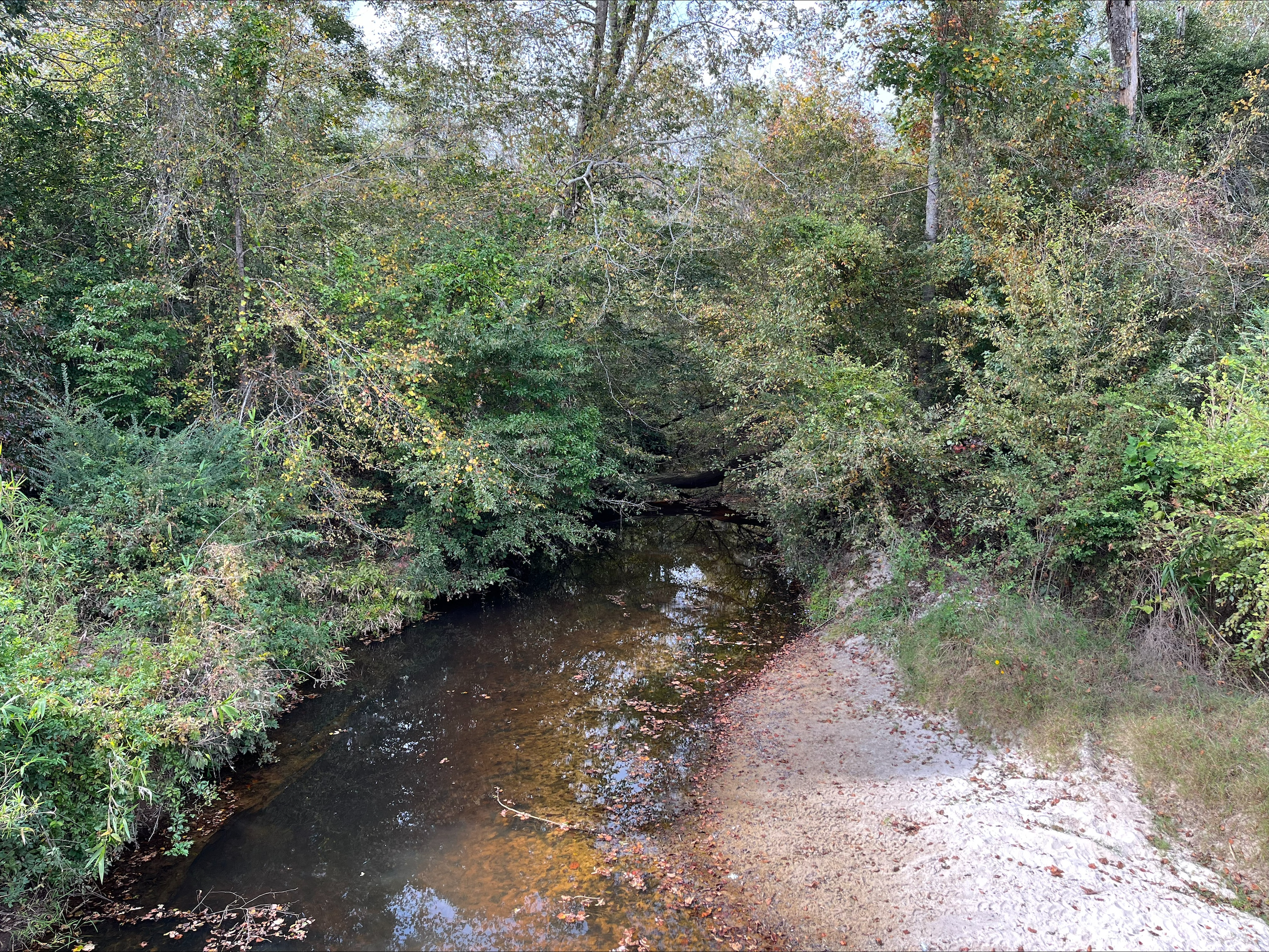
- Bogue Flower

Location
- Country: United States
- State: Mississippi

Physical characteristics
- Source
  - coordinates: 32.467641°N 88.8881068°W
- Mouth
  - coordinates: 32.3695875°N 88.9019961°W
- Length: 8.16 mi (13.13 km)

Bogue Flower is a stream in the U.S. state of Mississippi. It is a tributary to Tallahatta Creek.

Bogue Flower is a name derived from the Choctaw language meaning "long creek" (the element "flower" in this context is a corruption of an Indian word). A variant name is "Bogue Flower Creek".

During the Meridian campaign in February 1864, General William Sherman camped alongside Bogue Flower.

The Bogue Flower Boys is a bluegrass group from Suqualena, Mississippi.
