= Uneedus, Louisiana =

Unincorporated community in Louisiana

- Unincorporated community
- Motto(s): Home of the needy, and needed by none.
- Location within Louisiana Location within the United States
- Coordinates: 30°37′03″N 90°15′40″W
- Country: United States
- State: Louisiana
- Parish: Tangipahoa
- Elevation: 29 ft (8.8 m)

Population (2023)
  - Total: 25−50 People
- Time zone: UTC-6 (Central (CST))
  - Summer (DST): UTC-5 (CDT)
- Area code: 985
- GNIS feature ID: 543746
- FIPS code: 22-76980

Uneedus is an unincorporated community in Tangipahoa Parish, in the U.S. state of Louisiana.

== History ==
The community's name is derived from shortening and alteration of "You need us", the motto of a local lumber company. A post office called Uneedus was established in 1912, and remained in operation until 1928.
