= Lewiston, Louisiana =

- Unincorporated community
- Location within Louisiana Location within the United States
- Coordinates: 30°56′29″N 90°25′20″W
- Country: United States
- State: Louisiana
- Parish: Tangipahoa
- Elevation: 3 ft (0.91 m)
- Time zone: UTC-6 (Central (CST))
  - Summer (DST): UTC-5 (CDT)
- Area code: 985
- GNIS feature ID: 556664
- FIPS code: 22-43675

Lewiston is an unincorporated community in Tangipahoa Parish, Louisiana, United States. The community is located 15 miles (24.14 kilometres) N of Amite City, Louisiana.
