= Eucutta Creek =

Stream in Mississippi, U.S.

Coordinates: 31.8296008°N 88.7111520°W

Eucutta Creek is a stream in the U.S. state of Mississippi. It is a tributary to the Chickasawhay River. Eucutta is a name derived from the Choctaw language, most likely meaning "large pond".

In 2014, a pipeline near Eucutta sprung a leak, discharging about 50 barrels of oil and 40 barrels of brine into the Eucutta creek. Many Wayne County environmental agencies have cleaned up the spill since then.
