= National Register of Historic Places listings in Harper County, Kansas =

Location of Harper County in Kansas

This is a list of the National Register of Historic Places listings in Harper County, Kansas. It is intended to be a complete list of the properties and districts on the National Register of Historic Places in Harper County, Kansas, United States. The locations of National Register properties and districts for which the latitude and longitude coordinates are included below, may be seen in an online map.

There are 9 properties and districts listed on the National Register in the county, and one former listing.

This National Park Service list is complete through NPS recent listings posted October 30, 2026.

== Current listings ==
	Name on the Register	Image	Date listed	Location	City or town	Description
1	Anthony Public Carnegie Library	Anthony Public Carnegie Library	June 25, 1987 (#87000954)	104 N. Springfield; 37°09′10″N 98°00′07″W	Anthony	
2	Anthony Theater	Anthony Theater	April 18, 1991 (#91000464)	220 W. Main St. 37°09′08″N 98°01′53″W	Anthony	
3	I.P. Campbell Building	I.P. Campbell Building	July 12, 2006 (#06000600)	116 W. Main St. 37°17′13″N 98°01′26″W	Harper	
4	First Congregational Church	First Congregational Church	June 27, 2014 (#14000349)	202 N. Bluff Ave. 37°09′12″N 98°01′53″W	Anthony	
5	Harper County Courthouse	Harper County Courthouse	November 22, 1978 (#78001282)	201 N. Jennings Ave. 37°09′14″N 98°01′46″W	Anthony	
6	Harper Standpipe	Harper Standpipe	July 10, 2017 (#100001288)	1012 Ash St. 37°17′10″N 98°01′51″W	Harper	
7	Old Runnymede Church	Old Runnymede Church	February 6, 1973 (#73000758)	11th and Pine Sts. 37°17′25″N 98°01′49″W	Harper	
8	Transcontinental Airway Beacon		July 29, 2024 (#100010565)	15 Northwest 20 Avenue; 37°09′14″N 98°04′45″W	Anthony	
9	US Post Office-Anthony	US Post Office-Anthony	October 17, 1989 (#89001631)	121 W. Steadman; 37°09′14″N 98°01′08″W	Anthony	

== Former listings ==
	Name on the Register	Image	Date listed	Date removed	Location	City or town	Description
1	Thompson-Wohlschlegel Round Barn		February 21, 1985 (#85000315)	December 28, 2020	Off U.S. Route 160, south on County Road 1485; 37°16′33″N 97°58′04″W	Harper	

== See also ==
- List of National Historic Landmarks in Kansas
- National Register of Historic Places listings in Kansas
