= K-179 (Kansas highway) =

State highway in Kansas, U.S.

K-179
- K-179 highlighted in red

Route information
- Maintained by KDOT and the city of Anthony
- Length: 11.588 mi (18.649 km)
- Existed: c. 1956–present

Major junctions
- South end: SH-132 at the Oklahoma state line in Manchester, OK
- North end: K-44 in Anthony

Location
- Country: United States
- State: Kansas
- Counties: Harper

Highway system
- Kansas State Highway System; Interstate; US; State; Spurs
← K-178	→ K-180

K-179 is an 11.588-mile-long (18.649 km) state highway in Harper County, Kansas. It runs from Oklahoma State Highway 132 (SH-132) the Oklahoma state line north to the city of Anthony, where it ends at K-44. The route was designated around 1956, and is not part of the National Highway System.

== Route description ==
Just north of Manchester, Oklahoma, K-179 begins running west along the Oklahoma state line as a continuation of SH-132. The route then turns due north and continues through flat farm fields. A series of curves take the highway slightly to the northeast before it enters the city of Anthony, where it becomes known as Jennings Avenue. Just more than 0.5 miles (0.80 km) north of the Anthony city limits, K-179 meets its northern terminus at an intersection with K-44, also known as Main Street.

All but .503 miles (1 km) of K-179's alignment is maintained by the Kansas Department of Transportation (KDOT). The entire section of K-179 within Anthony is maintained by the city. Every year, KDOT measures traffic on each of its state highways in terms of average annual daily traffic (AADT). In 2012, K-179 was found to have AADT counts of 303 on the first five miles (8.0 km) of the route and 433 just south of Anthony, the route's lowest and highest counts, respectively. The highway is not a part of the United States National Highway System.

== History ==
The road that would become K-179 first appeared on the 1936 state highway map as a paved county road connection. This roadway was designated as K-179 around 1956. The routing of the highway has not been modified since its designation.

== Major intersections ==
County	Location	mi	km	Destinations	Notes
Kansas–Oklahoma line		0.000	0.000	SH-132 south	Continuation into Manchester, Oklahoma
Harper	Anthony	11.588	18.649	K-44 (Main Street) to K-2 / K-14 – Harper, Caldwell	Northern terminus; road continues as Jennings Avenue; K-44 east serves Anthony Medical Center
1.000 mi = 1.609 km; 1.000 km = 0.621 mi
