= K-44 (Kansas highway) =

State highway in Kansas, U.S.

K-44
- K-44 highlighted in red

Route information
- Maintained by KDOT and the city of Anthony
- Length: 24.674 mi (39.709 km)
- Existed: c. 1927–present

Major junctions
- West end: K-2 in Anthony
- East end: K-49 north of Caldwell

Location
- Country: United States
- State: Kansas
- Counties: Harper, Sumner

Highway system
- Kansas State Highway System; Interstate; US; State; Spurs
← K-43	→ K-46

K-44 is a state highway in the U.S. state of Kansas. It begins at K-2 in Anthony and passes through Harper and Sumner counties in the south-central portion of the state, ending at K-49 north of Caldwell. The highway is 24.674 miles (39.709 km) long, and it was designated around 1932. Its alignment has not undergone a major change since then.

== Route description ==
K-44 begins at a junction with K-2 in Anthony, the county seat of Harper County; within the city limits of Anthony, K-44 is known as Main Street. From its western terminus, the route heads east as a two-lane road, coming to another highway junction, the northern terminus of K-179, approximately 1/2 mile (0.80 km) east of K-2. K-44 then leaves Anthony, continuing east through hilly farmland in eastern Harper County, before crossing into Sumner County approximately thirteen miles (21 km) east of Anthony. The highway crosses the Chikaskia River north of Caldwell. Just east of the river crossing, the route curves slightly to the southeast and comes to an intersection with K-49, where it ends.

All but 1.291 miles (2 km) of K-44's alignment is maintained by the Kansas Department of Transportation (KDOT). The entire section within Anthony is maintained by the city. In 2013, KDOT measured traffic counts in terms of average annual daily traffic (AADT) on K-44 ranging from a high of 729 vehicles in Anthony to a low of 313 vehicles in western Sumner County.

== History ==
K-44 first appeared on the 1927 Kansas state highway map. Its alignment when it was designated is identical to that which it follows today; however, the road was not yet paved. This did not happen until sometime between 1948 and 1950, and the highway has not been majorly modified since then.

== Junction list ==
County	Location	mi	km	Destinations	Notes
Harper	Anthony	0.000	0.000	K-2 – Kiowa, Harper	Western terminus; former K-14; highway continues as K-2 south (Main Street west)
Harper	Anthony	0.505	0.813	K-179 south (Jennings Avenue) – Manchester OK	Northern terminus of K-179
Sumner	Chikaskia Township	24.674	39.709	K-49 – Wellington, Caldwell	Eastern terminus
1.000 mi = 1.609 km; 1.000 km = 0.621 mi
