= K-2 (Kansas highway) =

Highway in Kansas, U.S.

K-2
- K-2 highlighted in red

Route information
- Maintained by KDOT and the cities of Anthony and Harper
- Length: 61.516 mi (99.000 km)
- Existed: January 7, 1937–present

Major junctions
- South end: US-281 east of Hardtner
- US-160 from Anthony to Harper
- North end: K-42 west of Viola

Location
- Country: United States
- State: Kansas
- Counties: Barber, Harper, Kingman, Sumner

Highway system
- Kansas State Highway System; Interstate; US; State; Spurs
← K-1	→ K-3

K-2 is a 61.516-mile-long (99.000 km) state highway in the south-central portion of the U.S. state of Kansas. Its southern terminus is at an intersection with U.S. Route 281 (US-281) east of Hardtner and its northern terminus is at an intersection with K-42 west of the town of Viola. Along the way K-2 passes through the cities of Kiowa, Hazelton, Anthony and Harper. Between the latter two, it has an overlap with US-160.

Before state highways were numbered in Kansas, there were auto trails. A short section of K-2 west of Kiowa follows the former Oklahoma-Kansas-Colorado Highway. K-2 was designated on January 7, 1937, and went from US-160 north to K-42 in Norwich. Between 1961 and 1963, K-2 was extended in both directions, eastward to overlap with K-14 to US-281 and westward to overlap K-42 to US-54. On December 24, 1994, the overlaps with K-42 and K-14 were eliminated.

== Route description ==
K-2's southern terminus is at US-281 east of Hardtner in Barber County. The highway proceeds east, just 1.5 miles (2.4 km) north of Kansas-Oklahoma border, through flat rural farmland. The highway crosses Little Mule Creek before intersecting Coates Street, where it curves south. K-2 then quickly curves back east at Bare Road, then enters Kiowa as Main Street. The highway has an at-grade crossing with a BNSF Railway track. K-2 then intersects the northern terminus of the southern leg of K-8 (4th Street), before turning north onto 7th Street. K-2 begins to curve northeast at Hardtner Street and soon exits the city as it passes by a school. K-2 continues northeast, parallel to the railroad track and after a short distance crosses Medicine Lodge River. The highway continues through rural farmland for another 1.6 miles (2.6 km) then crosses Lone Tree Canyon. It continues northeast along the railroad track and briefly passes through the northwest corner of Hazelton. The highway passes just north of Spicer Lake before crossing over Salty Creek. K-2 then enters into Harper County. The highway crosses Little Sandy Creek then curves east away from the railroad. The highway continues east through flat farmland and soon crosses Sandy Creek, then Camp Creek 2.3 miles (3.7 km) later. K-2 continues east to an intersection with 80 Avenue, which travels south to Waldron.

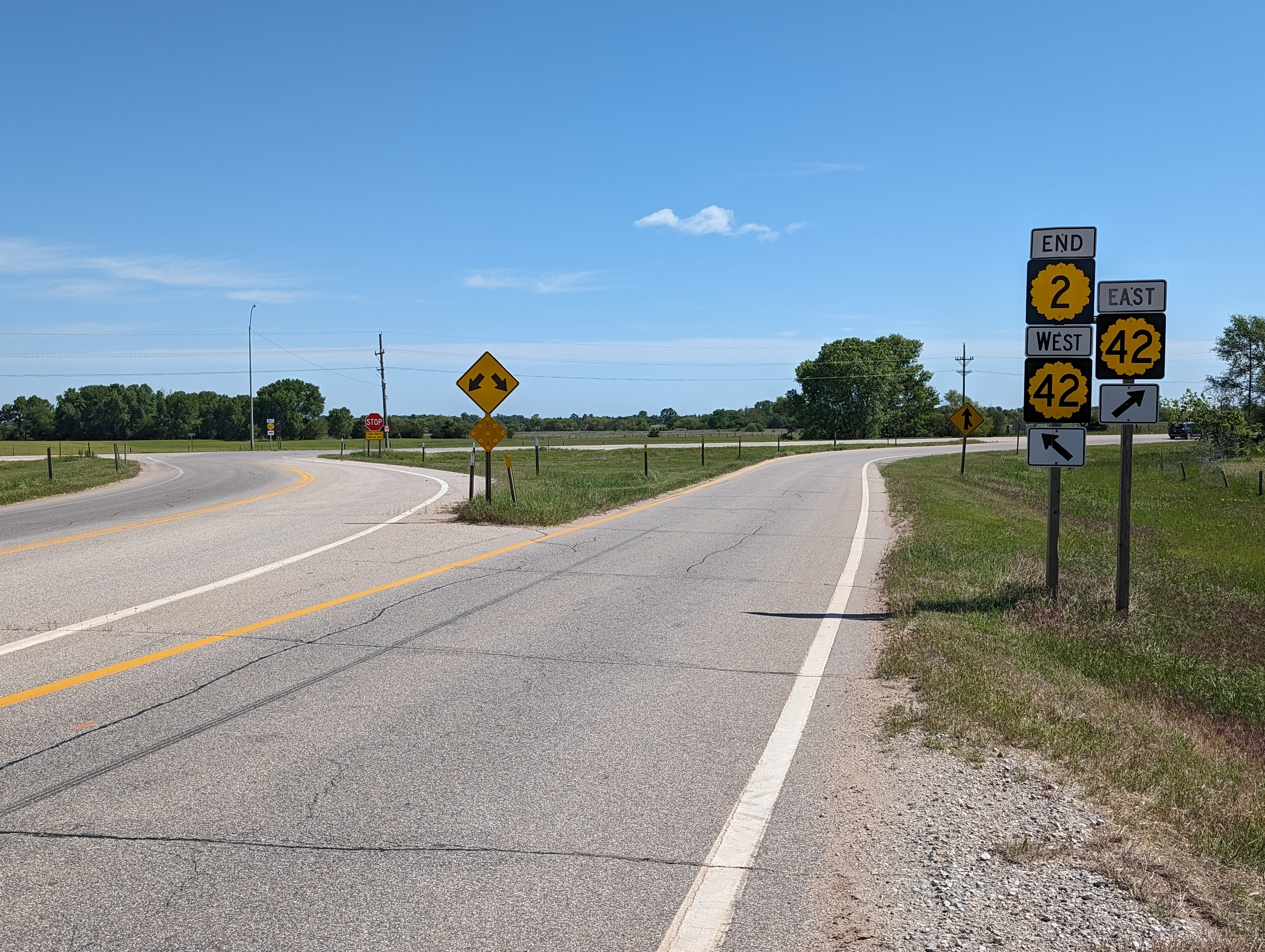
The northern terminus of K-2 at K-42

K-2 crosses Beaver Creek, then Bluff Creek before reaching Anthony Municipal Airport. The roadway crosses over Spring Creek, and then enters Anthony as Main Street. K-2 turns north onto LL&G Avenue, at the western terminus of K-44. The highway exits the city and passes to the east of Anthony Municipal Lake. The highway continues through flat rural farmland to an intersection with US-160, which it begins to overlap. The two routes continue north for about 2.3 miles (3.7 km) before entering Harper. The highway continues past the Harper Municipal Airport then turns east onto 14th Street, at the southern terminus of K-14. K-2 and US-160 continue through the city for 1.1 miles (1.8 km) then K-2 turns north and US-160 continues east. K-2 heads north for a short distance then curves northeast and exits the city. The highway then crosses over a BNSF Railway track before crossing Sand Creek. It continues northeast through more farmland for 3.9 miles (6.3 km) then crosses Spring Creek. K-2 continues northeast, passing through Runnymede, before crossing over Chikaskia River and entering into Kingman County. K-2 continues northeast through farmland to a junction with SE 150th Avenue, which travels north to Norwich. The highway continues to an at-grade crossing with a Kansas and Oklahoma Railway track then enters into Sumner County. It then reaches its northern terminus at K-42 west of Viola.

The Kansas Department of Transportation (KDOT) tracks the traffic levels on its highways, and in 2024, they determined that on average the traffic varied from 605 vehicles per day slightly northeast of Hazelton to 3895 vehicles per day slightly north of Anthony. K-2 is not included in the National Highway System. The National Highway System is a system of highways important to the nation's defense, economy, and mobility. The 1.128-mile (1.815 km) section of K-2's alignment within Anthony is maintained by the city. The section of K-2 in Harper from K-14 to the north city line is maintained by the city.

== History ==
Prior to the formation of the Kansas state highway system, there were auto trails, which were an informal network of marked routes that existed in the United States and Canada in the early part of the 20th century. A short section of K-2 west of Kiowa follows the former Oklahoma-Kansas-Colorado Highway.

K-2 was originally designated in 1927, from Norton west to the Colorado border. Then between 1930 and 1931, K-2 became part of US-36 when it was extended west into Colorado. The current K-2 was designated on January 7, 1937, and went from US-160 in Harper to K-42 in Norwich. Until 1950, K-2 turned northward onto current SE 150th Avenue south of Norwich and ended at K-42 in Norwich. Then in a January 1, 1950 resolution, the turn was eliminated and it continued northeastward to end at K-42 east of Norwich. Between 1961 and 1963, K-2 was extended in both directions, eastward to overlap with K-14 to US-281 and westward to overlap K-42 to US-54. In mid May 1967, the SHC approved a bid of $88,694 (equivalent to $634,873 in 2024 dollars) to rebuild the junction with K-42 east of Norwich. Then in two separate December 24, 1994 resolutions, the concurrency with K-42 became K-42 only, and the concurrency with K-14 became K-2 only.

== Major intersections ==
County	Location	mi	km	Destinations	Notes
Barber	Kiowa Township	0.000	0.000	US-281 – Alva Okla., Medicine Lodge	Southern terminus
Barber	Kiowa	4.511	7.260	K-8 south (4th Street) – Cherokee OK	Northern terminus of K-8; serves Kiowa District Hospital
Harper	Anthony	33.666	54.180	K-44 east (Main Street) to K-49 / K-179	Western terminus of K-44
Harper	Township 5	39.700	63.891	US-160 west – Attica, Medicine Lodge	Southern end of US-160 concurrency
Harper	Harper	42.715	68.743	K-14 north – Kingman	Southern terminus of K-14
Harper	Harper	43.827	70.533	US-160 east (14th Street east) – Wellington	Northern end of US-160 concurrency
Kingman	No major junctions				
Sumner	Eden Township	61.516	99.000	K-42 – Norwich, Wichita	Northern terminus; K-42 east is former K-2 north
1.000 mi = 1.609 km; 1.000 km = 0.621 mi: Concurrency terminus
