= Gibbon, Oklahoma =

Gibbon
- Location within Oklahoma
- Coordinates: 36°56′34″N 97°58′56″W
- Country: United States
- State: Oklahoma
- County: Grant

Gibbon is a populated place in Grant County, Oklahoma. It is southeast of Manchester and northwest of Wakita.

While never formally incorporated, the town was given a post office on March 26, 1896 by early settler William M. McGibbon, to which he attached the “Gibbon” name. Located on a rail line, the town had two grain elevators, two general stores, a railroad depot, a lumber yard, a cheese factory, a stockyard and a hotel by 1915. Unfortunately, the highway (Oklahoma State Highway 132) bypassed the town, and the drought in the 1930s was hard on the farmers in the area. Businesses left, and the post office closed in 1945. Few vestiges of a town remain.
