= Runnymede, Kansas =

Unincorporated community in Harper County, Kansas

Coordinates: 37°21′23″N 97°55′47″W

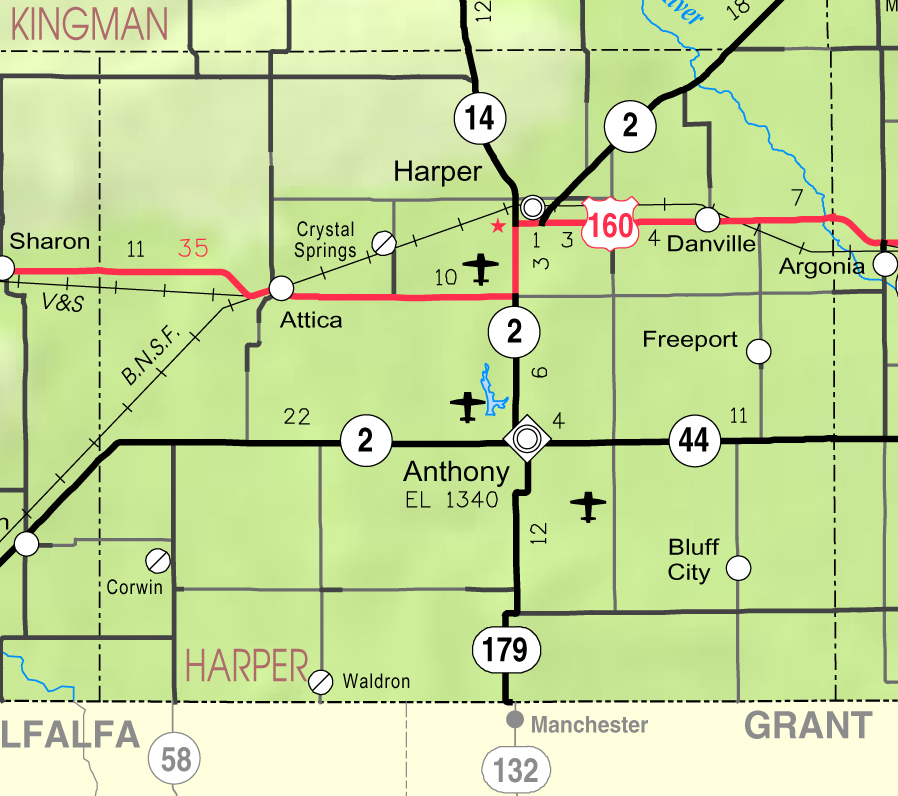
KDOT map of Harper County (legend)

Runnymede is an unincorporated community in Harper County, Kansas, United States. It is located northeast of Harper along K-2 state highway at the intersection of NE 140 Rd and NE 60 Ave.

== History ==
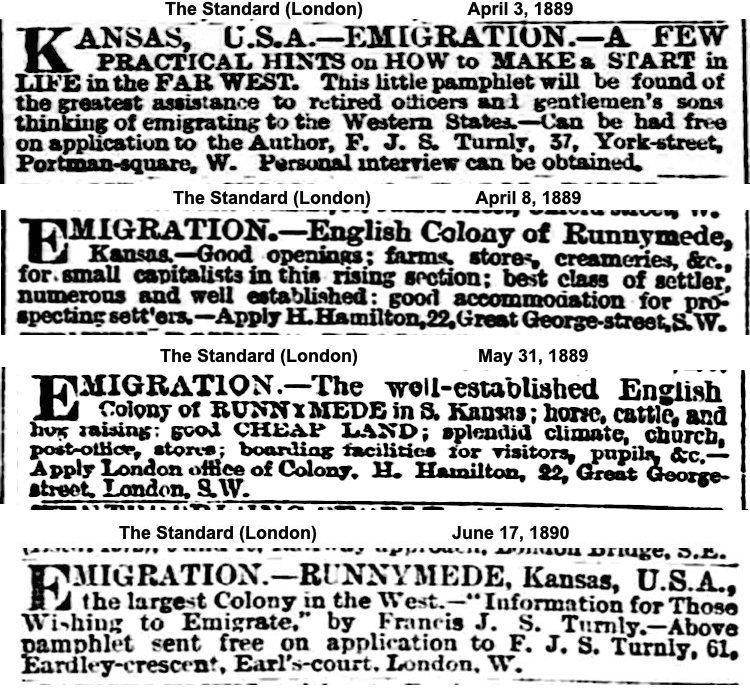
Four newspaper advertisements (1889-1890) from The Standard for the settlement of Runnymede, Kansas.

Runnymede was touted by an Irish promoter as a planned community in Kansas to wealthy Irish and Great British families in the United Kingdom as a place in a "dry" state where their sons could come to begin a career as gentlemen farmers. Begun in 1888, the speculative though impressive scheme essentially collapsed within four years. The livery stable burned down in 1890. Other buildings were moved two miles (3.2 km) south close to the new constructed rail line. In 1891, the centerpiece of the town, a hotel, was partly disassembled and moved into the recently opened Cherokee Strip in Alva, Oklahoma in 1893. It remains in use there today, thanks to a successful local effort at restoration. Runnymede's church was moved to Harper, Kansas in 1893, where it now serves as a museum.

A post office was opened in Runnymede in 1879, and remained in operation until it was discontinued in 1944.

The community was named after Runnymede in England.

William Desmond Taylor joined the Runnymede community in August 1891.

== Area attractions ==
- Kansas Historical Marker - Old Runnymede.
- Old Runnymede Church, located in Harper, Kansas.

== Education ==
The community is served by Chaparral USD 361 public school district.
