= Chaparral High School (Kansas) =

Location
- 467 North State Highway 14; Anthony, Kansas 67003; United States; 37°13′07″N 98°02′28″W

Information
- School type: Public, High School
- Established: 1971
- School board: Board Website
- School district: Chaparral USD 361
- CEEB code: 170095
- Principal: Justin Hill
- Grades: 7 to 12
- Gender: coed
- Enrollment: 360 (2023-2024)
- Hours in school day: 7 hours, 26 minutes
- Campus type: Rural
- Colors: Blue; Gold
- Athletics: Class 3A; District 12
- Athletics conference: Central Plains
- Sports: tennis, baseball, basketball cheerleading cross country, football, golf, softball, volleyball, track, and wrestling
- Mascot: Road Runner
- Team name: Chaparral Roadrunners
- Rival: Kingman High School
- Communities served: Anthony, Harper
- Website: School Website

Chaparral High School is a public secondary school in rural Harper County, Kansas, United States, and located approximately halfway between the cities of Anthony and Harper. The school is operated by Chaparral USD 361 school district, and serves students of grades 7 to 12.

== Overview ==
The school was established in 1971. Its building was designed by Schaefer, Schirmer & Eflin of Wichita.

== Students ==
Chaparral High School made Adequate Yearly Progress (AYP) in 2009. (Under No Child Left Behind, a school makes AYP if it achieves the minimum levels of improvement determined by the state of Kansas in terms of student performance and other accountability measures.)

In 2008, Chaparral High School had 13 students for every full-time equivalent teacher. The Kansas average is 13 students per full-time equivalent teacher. The Anthony-Harper School District spends $11,031 per pupil in current expenditures. The district spent 59% on instruction, 15% on administration, instructional, and student support services, 11% on operations and maintenance, 7% on transportation, 4% on food services, and 4% on debt service in the 2014-15 school year.

As of 2023 there are 350 students enrolled at this high school with 79% being white, 15% being Hispanic, 5% being multiracial,1% being American Indian, and .5% being Asian.

== Extracurricular activities ==
Chaparral High School also offers various extracurricular activities other than athletics including: Chess team, Debate and Forensics, Distinguished Graduates, Future Business Leaders of America, Fellowship of Christian Athletes, Future Farmers of America, Key Club, National Honor Society, Pep Club, Roadrunner Bands, Student Counsel, Teens as Teachers, Scholars Bowl, and Technology Student Association.

== See also ==
- List of high schools in Kansas
- List of unified school districts in Kansas
