= List of Carnegie libraries in Kansas =

The following list of Carnegie libraries in Kansas provides detailed information on United States Carnegie libraries in Kansas, where 59 public libraries were built from 58 grants (totaling $874,996) awarded by the Carnegie Corporation of New York from 1900 to 1916. In addition, academic libraries were built at 7 institutions (totaling $195,500).

== Key ==
Building still operating as a library
Building standing, but now serving another purpose
Building no longer standing
Building listed on the National Register of Historic Places
Building contributes to a historic district on the National Register of Historic Places

== Public libraries ==
	Library	City or town	Image	Date granted	Grant amount	Location	Notes
1	Abilene	Abilene		Dec 8, 1905	$12,500	209 NW 4th St.	
2	Anthony	Anthony		Dec 14, 1908	$10,000	104 N. Springfield Ave. 37°09′10″N 98°00′07″W	
3	Arkansas City	Arkansas City		Apr 10, 1906	$18,400	215 W. 5th Ave.	
4	Burlington	Burlington		Apr 25, 1911	$9,656	201 N. 3rd St. 38°11′46″N 95°44′01″W	
5	Caldwell	Caldwell		Dec 2, 1909	$7,000	13 N. Osage St. 37°01′58″N 97°36′34″W	
6	Canton	Canton	Public Library of Canton, KS funded by Andrew Carnegie	Nov 9, 1916	$6,000	300 N. Main St. 38°23′17″N 97°25′35″W	Built in 1921, the last-built Carnegie library in the United States. Continues to be used as a public library. (2013)
7	Chanute	Chanute		Dec 30, 1904	$14,500	102 S. Lincoln Ave.	
8	Cherryvale	Cherryvale		Apr 30, 1912	$10,000	329 E. Main St. 37°16′01″N 95°32′55″W	Continues to be used as a public library. (2013)
9	Clay Center	Clay Center		Dec 2, 1909	$10,000	706 6th St. 39°22′36″N 97°07′26″W	
10	Coffeyville	Coffeyville		Jan 6, 1911	$25,000	415 W. 8th St. 37°02′09″N 95°37′23″W	No longer a public library. (2013)
11	Columbus	Columbus		Jul 13, 1912	$10,000	205 N. Kansas Ave. 37°10′22″N 94°50′36″W	Continues to be used as a public library. (2013)
12	Concordia	Concordia		Dec 13, 1907	$10,000	635 Broadway	Replaced by Frank Carlson Library, building is used for Cloud County Historical Museum
13	Council Grove	Council Grove		Mar 27, 1903	$10,000	303 W. Main St. 38°39′35″N 96°29′37″W	Currently is the Morris County Historical Society
14	Dodge City	Dodge City		Feb 1, 1905	$8,500	701 N. 2nd Ave. 37°45′17″N 100°01′08″W	Currently is the Carnegie Art Center
15	Downs	Downs		Jan 19, 1905	$6,140	504 S. Morgan Ave. 39°30′14″N 98°32′40″W	
16	El Dorado	El Dorado		Nov 30, 1910	$10,000	101 S. Star St. 37°49′00″N 96°51′17″W	No longer used as a public library building. (2013)
17	Emporia	Emporia		Apr 26, 1902	$22,000	118 E. 6th St. 38°24′19″N 96°10′40″W	
18	Eureka	Eureka		May 21, 1913	$9,000	520 N. Main St. 37°49′29″N 96°17′23″W	
19	Fort Scott	Fort Scott		Mar 14, 1901	$18,000	201 S. National Ave. 37°50′25″N 94°42′23″W	Continues to be used as a public library. (2013)
20	Garden City	Garden City		Apr 17, 1909	$10,000	702 N. Main St.	
21	Girard	Girard		Nov 24, 1905	$9,000	128 W. Prairie St. 37°30′37″N 94°50′42″W	Continues to be used as a public library. (2013)
22	Goodland	Goodland		Dec 14, 1908	$10,000	120 W. 12th St. 39°20′50″N 101°42′46″W	
23	Great Bend	Great Bend		Nov 14, 1906	$12,500		
24	Halstead	Halstead		Jan 23, 1909	$7,500		
25	Hays	Hays		Apr 28, 1910	$9,000		By 1964, all space was crammed. The building was replaced on December 8, 1968, to allow to the growing collection. The current Hays Public Library, built in 2004, stands in the same location and the exterior is a replication of the original Carnegie Library.
26	Herington	Herington		Jul 9, 1913	$10,000	102 S. Broadway; 38°40′05″N 96°56′30″W	
27	Hiawatha	Hiawatha		Apr 10, 1906	$10,000	431 Oregon St.	
28	Hutchinson	Hutchinson		Apr 11, 1902	$32,000	427 N. Main St. 38°03′35″N 97°55′51″W	
29	Independence	Independence		Nov 24, 1905	$22,500	220 E. Maple St. 37°13′25″N 95°42′12″W	Continues to be used as a public library. (2013)
30	Iola	Iola		Dec 20, 1904	$15,000		
31	Kansas City Main	Kansas City		Jul 4, 1901	$100,000		
32	Kansas City Argentine	Kansas City		1914	$25,000	2800 Metropolitan Ave. 39°04′27″N 94°39′39″W	
33	Kingman	Kingman		May 21, 1913	$10,000	455 N. Main St. 37°38′45″N 98°06′47″W	
34	Lawrence	Lawrence		May 31, 1902	$27,500	200 W. 9th St. 38°58′04″N 95°14′15″W	
35	Leavenworth	Leavenworth		Jan 16, 1900	$30,000	601 S. 5th St. 39°18′48″N 94°54′55″W	
36	Lincoln	Lincoln	Lincoln, KS public library funded by Andrew Carnegie.	Mar 14, 1913	$6,000	203 S. 3rd St. 39°02′21″N 98°08′41″W	Continues to be used as a public library. (2013)
37	Lyndon	Lyndon		Dec 2, 1909	$8,000	127 E. 6th St. 38°36′27″N 95°40′58″W	
38	Lyons	Lyons		Jan 5, 1909	$6,000	105 W. Lyon St.	
39	Manhattan	Manhattan		Jan 22, 1903	$10,000	105 Courthouse Plaza; 39°10′43″N 96°33′55″W	
40	McPherson	McPherson		Mar 16, 1915	$12,500		
41	Newton	Newton		Mar 14, 1902	$160,000	203 Main St. 38°02′39″N 97°20′42″W	Currently is the Harvey County Historical Museum
42	Olathe	Olathe		Dec 24, 1909	$10,000		
43	Osawatomie	Osawatomie		Apr 16, 1910	$7,500		
44	Osborne	Osborne		Jan 27, 1912	$6,000	307 N. Main St. 39°26′16″N 98°41′55″W	
45	Oswego	Oswego		Dec 2, 1909	$5,000	701 4th St. 37°10′01″N 95°06′27″W	Continues to be used as a public library. (2013)
46	Ottawa	Ottawa		Jan 9, 1902	$15,000	515 S. Main St. 38°36′15″N 95°15′43″W	No longer used as a public library. (2013)
47	Parsons	Parsons		Nov 14, 1907	$22,500	117 S. 17th St. 37°20′23″N 95°15′39″W	No longer used as a public library. (2013)
48	Peabody	Peabody		Mar 20, 1913	$10,000	214 N. Walnut St. 38°10′02″N 97°06′24″W	Continues to be used as a public library (as of 2022). NRHP Application
49	Pittsburg	Pittsburg		Jun 25, 1909	$40,000	308 N. Walnut St. 37°24′40″N 94°42′26″W	
50	Plainville	Plainville		Feb 20, 1911	$5,000		
51	Russell	Russell		Jun 8, 1905	$5,800		
52	Salina	Salina		Feb 15, 1902	$15,000		
53	Sterling	Sterling		Nov 9, 1916	$10,000	138 N. Broadway Ave. 38°12′38″N 98°12′25″W	
54	Stockton	Stockton		Dec 24, 1909	$5,000	124 N. Cedar St.	
55	Washington	Washington		Apr 23, 1908	$5,000		
56	Wellington	Wellington		Apr 19, 1915	$17,500	121 W. 7th St. 37°16′03″N 97°23′56″W	
57	Wichita	Wichita		Jul 13, 1912	$75,000	220 S. Main St. 37°41′14″N 97°20′21″W	For half a century, the building was a library. It later became a municipal court building and then the Wichita Omnisphere and Science Center. As of 2015 it is the commercial bankers division of Fidelity Bank. It is not open to the public.
58	Winfield	Winfield		Feb 15, 1902	$15,000	1001 Millington St. 37°14′19″N 96°59′47″W	
59	Yates Center	Yates Center		Jan 31, 1910	$7,500	218 N. Main St. 37°53′00″N 95°43′54″W	

== Academic libraries ==
	Institution	Locality	Image	Year granted	Grant amount	Location	Notes
1	Baker University	Baldwin City		Mar 12, 1906	$37,000	604 8th St. 38°46′39″N 95°11′20″W	
2	Bethany College	Lindsborg		Apr 4, 1905	$20,000		
3	College of Emporia (defunct)	Emporia		Jan 3, 1900	$30,000	1300 W. 12th Ave. 38°24′46″N 96°11′38″W	Andrew Carnegie provided funds to build this Anderson Memorial Library in memory of John Anderson, a former board of trustee of this college. When Anderson lived in Allegheny, Pennsylvania, he opened his book collection to working boys, including a young Andrew Carnegie. Carnegie publicly credited Anderson with instilling a love of books and self-education that later enabled Carnegie to build an empire and inspired him to establish an endowment to build libraries throughout the nation. This building was the first Carnegie grant in Kansas, though the Leavenworth library was the first dedicated in Kansas.
4	Fairmount College (Wichita State University)	Wichita		Feb 7, 1905	$40,000	West of Fiske Hall; 37.71705°N 97.29669°W	Library 1909–1939, Art and Journalism 1939–1964, fire destroyed this building in 1964. Three columns from the former building currently sit next to a 17th street entrance at WSU. The Ulrich Museum of Art currently sits on the former site of this building.
5	McPherson College	McPherson		Apr 18, 1905	$13,500		Library 1907–1972, now Beeghly Hall
6	Midland College	Atchison		Feb 27, 1906	$15,000		
7	Washburn College	Topeka		Mar 10, 1904	$40,000	1675 SW 18th St. 39°02′08″N 95°42′03″W	

== See also ==
- List of libraries in the United States
