= KS-2 =

KS2 or KS-2 may refer to:

- Kansas's 2nd congressional district, to the United States House of Representatives
- K-2 (Kansas highway), an American road
- Key Stage 2, a British term in primary education
