= Freeport, Kansas =

Unincorporated community in Harper County, Kansas

- Unincorporated community
- Location within Harper County and Kansas

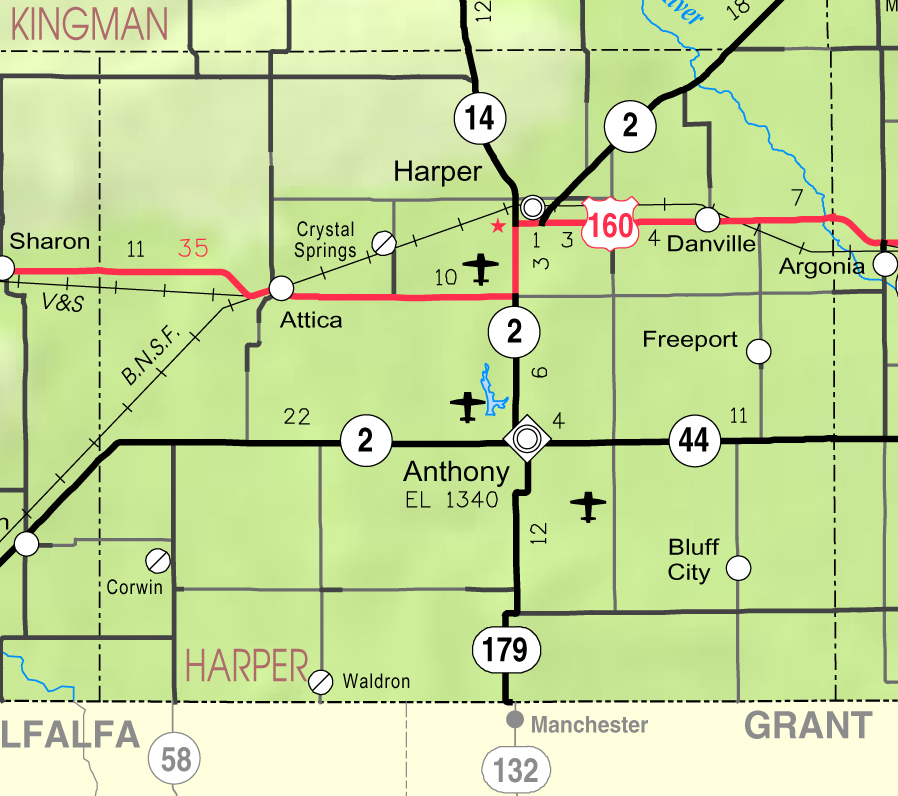
- KDOT map of Harper County (legend)
- Coordinates: 37°11′50″N 97°51′23″W
- Country: United States
- State: Kansas
- County: Harper
- Founded: 1885

Area
  - Total: 0.20 sq mi (0.52 km^{2})
  - Land: 0.20 sq mi (0.52 km^{2})
  - Water: 0 sq mi (0 km^{2})
- Elevation: 1,339 ft (408 m)

Population (2010)
  - Total: 5
  - Density: 25/sq mi (9.6/km^{2})
- Time zone: UTC-6 (CST)
  - Summer (DST): UTC-5 (CDT)
- ZIP Code: 67049
- Area code: 620
- FIPS code: 20-24725
- GNIS ID: 470290

Freeport is an unincorporated community in Harper County, Kansas, United States. As of the 2010 census, the population of the community was 5. It was an incorporated city until 2017, at which time it dissolved.

== History ==
Before officially being established as a city, Freeport was preceded by a settlement called Midlothian, which was located a few miles from Freeport's current location. Midlothian is the Scottish word for Midland.

Midlothian had a few amenities including a post office established in 1879, as well as a local school and church.

Freeport was founded in 1885. It was located on the Missouri Pacific Railway.

In the late 19th century Freeport was a growing town. Freeport boasted three lumberyards, two grain elevators, nine grocery stores, five dry goods stores, two meat markets, two hardware stores, three drug stores, four blacksmiths, one bank and two hotels. In 1892, the population of Freeport reached its peak at 700.

The Midlothian post office was renamed after the founding of Freeport. The post office was in operation at Freeport since 1885. The community has a grain elevator and a church.

Until November 2017, when the population had risen to eight, it was the smallest incorporated city in the state of Kansas. The city was dissolved by a vote of 4–0 in the November 2017 election.

== Geography ==
According to the United States Census Bureau, the community has a total area of 0.20 square miles (0.52 km^{2}), all land.

Freeport is surrounded by plains and farmland on all sides. There are no bodies of water and little tree coverage.

== Demographics ==
Historical population
Census	Pop.	Note	%±
1890	138		—
1900	83		−39.9%
1910	161		94.0%
1920	56		−65.2%
1930	105		87.5%
1940	67		−36.2%
1950	30		−55.2%
1960	31		3.3%
1970	21		−32.3%
1980	12		−42.9%
1990	8		−33.3%
2000	6		−25.0%
2010	5		−16.7%
2017 (est.)	8		60.0%
U.S. Decennial Census

=== 2010 census ===
As of the census of 2010, there were 5 people, 3 households, and 2 families residing in the community. The population density was 25.0 inhabitants per square mile (9.7/km^{2}). There were 4 housing units at an average density of 20.0 per square mile (7.7/km^{2}). The racial makeup of the community was 80.0% White and 20.0% Native American.

There were 3 households, of which 66.7% were married couples living together and 33.3% were non-families. 33.3% of all households were made up of individuals. The average household size was 1.67 and the average family size was 2.00.

The median age in the community was 66.5 years. 0.0% of residents were under the age of 18; 20% were between the ages of 18 and 24; 0.0% were from 25 to 44; 20% were from 45 to 64; and 60% were 65 years of age or older. The gender makeup of the community was 60.0% male and 40.0% female.

=== 2000 census ===
As of the census of 2000, there were 6 people, 3 households, and 3 families residing in the community. The population density was 31.5 inhabitants per square mile (12.2/km^{2}). There were 5 housing units at an average density of 26.3 per square mile (10.2/km^{2}). The racial makeup of the community was 100.00% White.

There were 3 households, out of which none had persons under the age of 18 living with them, 66.7% were married couples living together, and 33.3% had a female householder with no husband present. The average household size was 2.00 and the average family size was 2.00.

In the community, the population was spread out, with 33.3% from 45 to 64, and 66.7% who were 65 years of age or older. The median age was 66 years. For every 100 females, there were 100 males. For every 100 females age 18 and over, there were 100 males.

The median income for a household in the community was $31,250, and the median income for a family was $31,250. The per capita income for the community was $14,590. None of the population and none of the families were below the poverty line.

== Education ==
The community is served by Chaparral USD 361 public school district.
