= Bluff City, Kansas =

City in Harper County, Kansas

- City
- Location within Harper County and Kansas

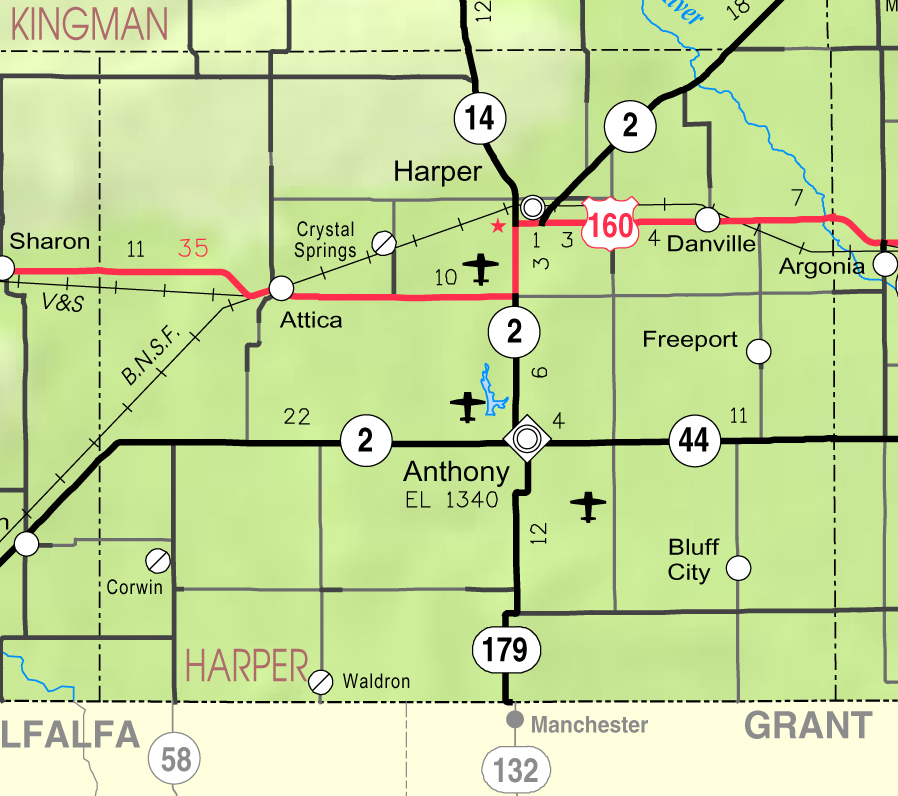
- KDOT map of Harper County (legend)
- Coordinates: 37°04′34″N 97°52′31″W
- Country: United States
- State: Kansas
- County: Harper
- Founded: 1879 (approx)
- Incorporated: 1887
- Named for: Bluff Creek

Area
  - Total: 0.51 sq mi (1.31 km^{2})
  - Land: 0.51 sq mi (1.31 km^{2})
  - Water: 0 sq mi (0.00 km^{2})
- Elevation: 1,240 ft (380 m)

Population (2020)
  - Total: 45
  - Density: 89/sq mi (34/km^{2})
- Time zone: UTC-6 (CST)
  - Summer (DST): UTC-5 (CDT)
- ZIP Code: 67018
- Area code: 620
- FIPS code: 20-07775
- GNIS ID: 2394208

Bluff City is a city in Harper County, Kansas, United States. As of the 2020 census, the population of the city was 45.

== History ==
Bluff City was founded about 1879. The community took its name from Bluff Creek, which flows past it.

Bluff City was a station and shipping point on the Kansas Southwestern Railway.

== Geography ==
According to the United States Census Bureau, the city has a total area of 0.54 square miles (1.40 km^{2}), all land.

=== Climate ===
The climate in this area is characterized by hot, humid summers and generally mild to cool winters. According to the Köppen Climate Classification system, Bluff City has a humid subtropical climate, abbreviated "Cfa" on climate maps.

== Demographics ==
Historical population
Census	Pop.	Note	%±
1890	194		—
1900	200		3.1%
1910	307		53.5%
1920	272		−11.4%
1930	233		−14.3%
1940	252		8.2%
1950	172		−31.7%
1960	152		−11.6%
1970	109		−28.3%
1980	95		−12.8%
1990	69		−27.4%
2000	80		15.9%
2010	65		−18.7%
2020	45		−30.8%
U.S. Decennial Census

=== 2020 census ===
The 2020 United States census counted 45 people, 21 households, and 11 families in Bluff City. The population density was 88.9 per square mile (34.3/km^{2}). There were 31 housing units at an average density of 61.3 per square mile (23.7/km^{2}). The racial makeup was 88.89% (40) white or European American (84.44% non-Hispanic white), 0.0% (0) black or African-American, 0.0% (0) Native American or Alaska Native, 0.0% (0) Asian, 0.0% (0) Pacific Islander or Native Hawaiian, 0.0% (0) from other races, and 11.11% (5) from two or more races. Hispanic or Latino of any race was 8.89% (4) of the population.

Of the 21 households, 33.3% had children under the age of 18; 23.8% were married couples living together; 14.3% had a female householder with no spouse or partner present. 42.9% of households consisted of individuals and 23.8% had someone living alone who was 65 years of age or older. The average household size was 4.6 and the average family size was 5.2. The percent of those with a bachelor's degree or higher was estimated to be 0.0% of the population.

20.0% of the population was under the age of 18, 2.2% from 18 to 24, 17.8% from 25 to 44, 35.6% from 45 to 64, and 24.4% who were 65 years of age or older. The median age was 53.3 years. For every 100 females, there were 66.7 males. For every 100 females ages 18 and older, there were 71.4 males.

=== 2010 census ===
As of the census of 2010, there were 65 people, 29 households, and 13 families residing in the city. The population density was 120.4 inhabitants per square mile (46.5/km^{2}). There were 42 housing units at an average density of 77.8 per square mile (30.0/km^{2}). The racial makeup of the city was 100.0% White.

There were 29 households, of which 24.1% had children under the age of 18 living with them, 37.9% were married couples living together, 3.4% had a female householder with no husband present, 3.4% had a male householder with no wife present, and 55.2% were non-families. 37.9% of all households were made up of individuals, and 10.3% had someone living alone who was 65 years of age or older. The average household size was 2.24 and the average family size was 3.15.

The median age in the city was 42.8 years. 23.1% of residents were under the age of 18; 3% were between the ages of 18 and 24; 32.2% were from 25 to 44; 27.7% were from 45 to 64; and 13.8% were 65 years of age or older. The gender makeup of the city was 55.4% male and 44.6% female.

== Education ==
The community is served by Chaparral USD 361 public school district.

Bluff City High School was closed through school unification. The Bluff City High School mascot was Tigers.

== External list ==
- Bluff City - Directory of Public Officials
