= Corwin, Kansas =

Unincorporated community in Harper County, Kansas

Coordinates: 37°05′03″N 98°18′16″W

Corwin is an unincorporated community in Blaine Township, Harper County, Kansas, United States.

== History ==
Corwin was a station and shipping point on the Missouri Pacific Railroad.

A post office was opened in Corwin in 1883, and remained in operation until it was discontinued in 1957.

== Education ==
The community is served by South Barber USD 255 public school district.
