= I.P. Campbell Building =

- U.S. National Register of Historic Places
- The I.P. Campbell Building in 2026

- Location within Kansas Location within the United States
- Location: 116 W. Main St., Harper, Kansas
- Coordinates: 37°17′13″N 98°01′26″W
- Area: less than one acre
- Built: 1881
- Architectural style: Gothic Revival
- NRHP reference No.: 06000600
- Added to NRHP: July 12, 2006

The I.P. Campbell Building, located at 116 W. Main St. in Harper, Kansas, was built in 1881. It was listed on the National Register of Historic Places in 2006.

It includes Gothic Revival architecture. It is a two-story slab-on-grade structure with native red sandstone walls. Its facade is trimmed with limestone. It is about 22 by 50 feet (6.7 m × 15.2 m) in plan. Its rear wall was replaced in 2001 after the stone wall collapsed.
