= Attica USD 511 =

Public school district in Attica, Kansas

Address
- 718 N Main St. Attica, Kansas, 67009; United States
- Coordinates: 37°14′45″N 98°13′38″W

District information
- Type: Public
- Grades: K to 12
- Schools: 2

Other information
- Website: usd511.net

Attica Junior/Senior High School

Location
- 718 North Main Street; Attica, (Harper County), Kansas 67009; United States

Information
- Type: Public high school
- Principal: Wyatt Williams
- Staff: 6.67 (FTE)
- Enrollment: 37 (2023-24)
- Student to teacher ratio: 5.55
- Colors: Black and gold
- Nickname: Bulldogs
- Website: Attica High School

Attica USD 511 is a public unified school district headquartered in Attica, Kansas, United States. The district includes the community of Attica and nearby rural areas.

== Schools ==
The school district operates the following schools:

- Attica Jr/Sr High School
- Puls Elementary

== See also ==
- Kansas State Department of Education
- Kansas State High School Activities Association
- List of high schools in Kansas
- List of unified school districts in Kansas
