= Crystal Springs, Kansas =

Unincorporated community in Harper County, Kansas

Coordinates: 37°15′43″N 98°08′05″W

Crystal Springs is an unincorporated community in Harper County, Kansas, United States.

== History ==
A post office was opened in Crystal Springs in 1885, and remained in operation until it was discontinued in 1976.

== Education ==
The community is served by Chaparral USD 361 public school district.
