= Albion, Kansas =

Coordinates: 37°15′45″N 97°48′16″W

Albion is a ghost town in Harper County, Kansas, United States.

== History ==
Albion was laid out in 1882. A post office called Albion was in operation from 1883 until 1902.

== See also ==
- List of ghost towns in Kansas
