= Cloud County Historical Museum =

History museum in Concordia, Kansas

Coordinates: 39°34′15″N 97°39′31″W

Cloud County Historical Museum, September 2007

The Cloud County Historical Museum is located in Concordia, Kansas. The Museum preserves and exhibits objects and documents of historical items representing early-day Kansas. It is housed in the former 1908 Carnegie library building and an annex.

== Exhibits ==
=== Martha Washington letter ===
On February 2, 2011, the museum announced that it had found in a drawer a letter from Martha Washington to her husband George Washington. The letter was authenticated in 1920 but then forgotten in storage for nearly a century.

=== Camp Concordia ===
Records are on display of Camp Concordia, the World War II military prisoner of war camp located in Cloud County. There are also original paintings of former prisoners of war on display and many other items of interest about Camp Concordia.

=== Hand-carved brick mural ===
The museum is now home to one of the largest hand-carved brick murals, located outdoors on the side of the museum annex building. The mural, named "The Whole Wall Mural", depicts various events and places in Cloud County history. It was designed and carved by Catharine Magel, with the assistance of Mara Smith, Jane Saunders and others.

=== Other records ===
Other records, churches, organizations, schools, and businesses. Displays of glass cutting, rare coins and books, rock and gem shop, micro-film of county newspapers and many others too numerous to list.

== See also ==
- List of Carnegie libraries in Kansas
- List of museums in Kansas
