= Township 3, Harper County, Kansas =

Township 3
- Township
- Location within Harper County
- Coordinates: 37°04′18″N 098°03′31″W
- Country: United States
- State: Kansas
- County: Harper

Area
  - Total: 148.41 sq mi (384.37 km^{2})
  - Land: 147.75 sq mi (382.67 km^{2})
  - Water: 0.65 sq mi (1.69 km^{2}) 0.44%
- Elevation: 1,352 ft (412 m)

Population (2020)
  - Total: 273
  - Density: 1.85/sq mi (0.713/km^{2})
- GNIS ID: 470501

Township 3 is a township in Harper County, Kansas, United States. As of the 2020 census, the population is 273.

== History ==
The township was officially designated "Township Number 3" until late 2007, when "Number" was dropped.

== Geography ==
Township 3 covers an area of 148.4 square miles (384 km^{2}) and contains no incorporated settlements.
