= Danville, Kansas =

City in Harper County, Kansas

- City
- Location within Harper County and Kansas

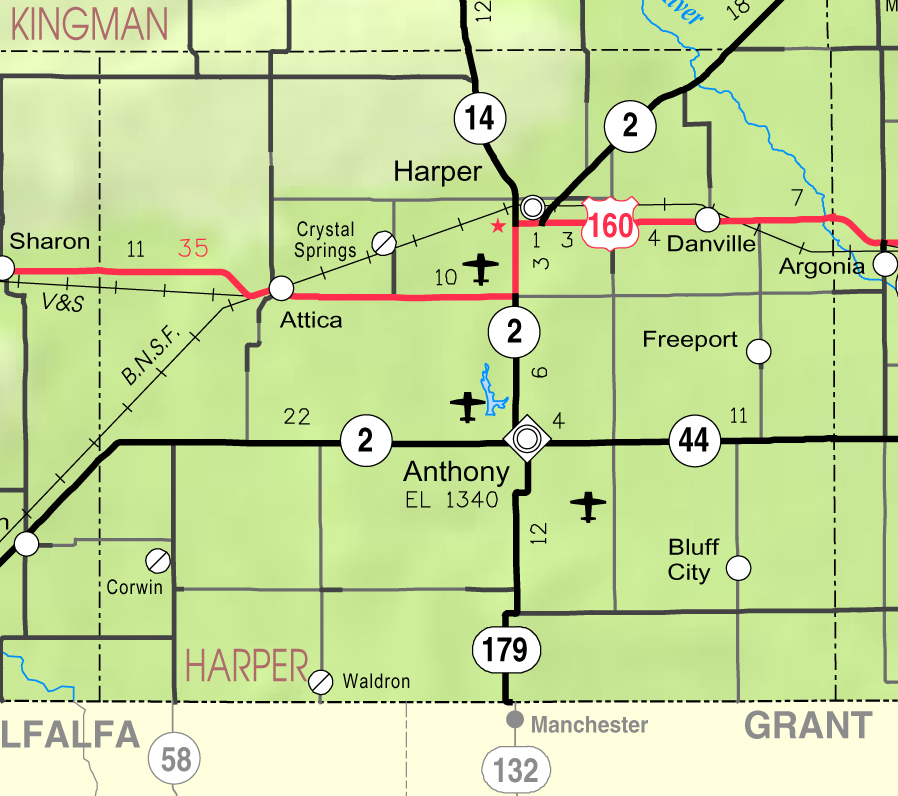
- KDOT map of Harper County (legend)
- Coordinates: 37°17′09″N 97°53′31″W
- Country: United States
- State: Kansas
- County: Harper
- Founded: 1880s
- Platted: 1880
- Incorporated: 1926
- Named for: Danville, Ohio

Area
  - Total: 0.081 sq mi (0.21 km^{2})
  - Land: 0.081 sq mi (0.21 km^{2})
  - Water: 0 sq mi (0.00 km^{2})
- Elevation: 1,342 ft (409 m)

Population (2020)
  - Total: 29
  - Density: 360/sq mi (140/km^{2})
- Time zone: UTC-6 (CST)
  - Summer (DST): UTC-5 (CDT)
- ZIP Code: 67036
- Area code: 620
- FIPS code: 20-17000
- GNIS ID: 2393717

Danville is a city in Harper County, Kansas, United States. As of the 2020 census, the population of the city was 29.

== History ==
Danville was originally known as Odell. It was change to Coleville in 1881 and platted in 1880 by Mrs. J. E. Cole. When Mrs. Cole later sold the town site, the name was changed to Danville, after Danville, Ohio.

== Geography ==
According to the United States Census Bureau, the city has a total area of 0.08 square miles (0.21 km^{2}), all land.

== Demographics ==
Historical population
Census	Pop.	Note	%±
1930	130		—
1940	134		3.1%
1950	122		−9.0%
1960	118		−3.3%
1970	80		−32.2%
1980	71		−11.2%
1990	56		−21.1%
2000	59		5.4%
2010	38		−35.6%
2020	29		−23.7%
U.S. Decennial Census

=== 2020 census ===
The 2020 United States census counted 29 people, 13 households, and 11 families in Danville. The population density was 349.4 per square mile (134.9/km^{2}). There were 19 housing units at an average density of 228.9 per square mile (88.4/km^{2}). The racial makeup was 82.76% (24) white or European American (75.86% non-Hispanic white), 0.0% (0) black or African-American, 0.0% (0) Native American or Alaska Native, 0.0% (0) Asian, 0.0% (0) Pacific Islander or Native Hawaiian, 0.0% (0) from other races, and 17.24% (5) from two or more races. Hispanic or Latino of any race was 10.34% (3) of the population.

Of the 13 households, 61.5% had children under the age of 18; 76.9% were married couples living together; 7.7% had a female householder with no spouse or partner present. 15.4% of households consisted of individuals and 7.7% had someone living alone who was 65 years of age or older. The average household size was 2.1 and the average family size was 2.3.

34.5% of the population was under the age of 18, 0.0% from 18 to 24, 10.3% from 25 to 44, 34.5% from 45 to 64, and 20.7% who were 65 years of age or older. The median age was 50.5 years. For every 100 females, there were 123.1 males. For every 100 females ages 18 and older, there were 90.0 males.

The 2016–2020 5-year American Community Survey estimates show that the median family income was $96,250 (+/- $87,780). The median income for those above 16 years old was $33,750 (+/- $33,344).

=== 2010 census ===
As of the census of 2010, there were 38 people, 19 households, and 8 families residing in the city. The population density was 475.0 inhabitants per square mile (183.4/km^{2}). There were 26 housing units at an average density of 325.0 per square mile (125.5/km^{2}). The racial makeup of the city was 100.0% White.

There were 19 households, of which 15.8% had children under the age of 18 living with them, 31.6% were married couples living together, 10.5% had a female householder with no husband present, and 57.9% were non-families. 42.1% of all households were made up of individuals, and 10.5% had someone living alone who was 65 years of age or older. The average household size was 2.00 and the average family size was 2.88.

The median age in the city was 47.5 years. 21.1% of residents were under the age of 18; 2.5% were between the ages of 18 and 24; 23.8% were from 25 to 44; 36.9% were from 45 to 64; and 15.8% were 65 years of age or older. The gender makeup of the city was 47.4% male and 52.6% female.

== Education ==
The community is served by Chaparral USD 361 public school district.

== External list ==
- Danville - Directory of Public Officials
