= Drummond, Oklahoma =

- Town
- Location in Garfield County and the state of Oklahoma
- Coordinates: 36°18′06″N 98°02′09″W
- Country: United States
- State: Oklahoma
- County: Garfield

Area
  - Total: 0.27 sq mi (0.71 km^{2})
  - Land: 0.27 sq mi (0.71 km^{2})
  - Water: 0 sq mi (0.00 km^{2})
- Elevation: 1,224 ft (373 m)

Population (2020)
  - Total: 455
  - Density: 1,659.1/sq mi (640.57/km^{2})
- Time zone: UTC-6 (Central (CST))
  - Summer (DST): UTC-5 (CDT)
- ZIP code: 73735
- Area code: 580
- FIPS code: 40-21700
- GNIS feature ID: 2412448

Drummond is a town in Garfield County, Oklahoma, United States. As of the 2020 census, Drummond had a population of 455.

== Geography ==
Drummond is located in southwestern Garfield County. Oklahoma State Highway 132 (Kansas Avenue) runs along the eastern edge of the town, leading north 6 miles (10 km) to U.S. Route 412 at a point 9 miles (14 km) west of Enid, the county seat. OK-132 leads south from Drummond 12 miles (19 km) to OK-51 at a point 7.5 miles (12.1 km) west of Hennessey.

According to the United States Census Bureau, Drummond has a total area of 0.2 square miles (0.6 km^{2}), all land.

== Demographics ==
Historical population
Census	Pop.	Note	%±
1900	637		—
1920	292		—
1930	254		−13.0%
1940	245		−3.5%
1950	314		28.2%
1960	281		−10.5%
1970	326		16.0%
1980	482		47.9%
1990	408		−15.4%
2000	405		−0.7%
2010	455		12.3%
2020	455		0.0%

=== 2020 census ===
As of the 2020 census, Drummond had a population of 455. The median age was 34.8 years. 26.4% of residents were under the age of 18 and 13.0% of residents were 65 years of age or older. For every 100 females there were 88.0 males, and for every 100 females age 18 and over there were 91.4 males age 18 and over.

0.0% of residents lived in urban areas, while 100.0% lived in rural areas.

There were 170 households in Drummond, of which 35.3% had children under the age of 18 living in them. Of all households, 47.6% were married-couple households, 22.9% were households with a male householder and no spouse or partner present, and 20.6% were households with a female householder and no spouse or partner present. About 22.4% of all households were made up of individuals and 10.6% had someone living alone who was 65 years of age or older.

There were 197 housing units, of which 13.7% were vacant. The homeowner vacancy rate was 2.3% and the rental vacancy rate was 19.4%.

Racial composition as of the 2020 census
Race	Number	Percent
White	324	71.2%
Black or African American	2	0.4%
American Indian and Alaska Native	7	1.5%
Asian	1	0.2%
Native Hawaiian and Other Pacific Islander	0	0.0%
Some other race	50	11.0%
Two or more races	71	15.6%
Hispanic or Latino (of any race)	107	23.5%

=== 2000 census ===
The median income for a household in the town was $37,188, and the median income for a family was $45,313. Males had a median income of $28,594 versus $19,750 for females. The per capita income for the town was $14,733. About 8.5% of families and 13.8% of the population were below the poverty line, including 20.3% of those under age 18 and 10.0% of those age 65 or over.

== Education ==
Its school district is Drummond Public Schools.
