= Duquoin, Kansas =

Unincorporated community in Harper County, Kansas

Coordinates: 37°22′58″N 98°04′25″W

Duquoin is an unincorporated community in Harper County, Kansas, United States.

== History ==
A post office was opened in Duquoin in 1883, and remained in operation until it was discontinued in 1975.

== Education ==
The community is served by Chaparral USD 361 public school district.

== Transportation ==
The Atchison, Topeka and Santa Fe Railway formerly provided passenger rail service to Duquoin on a line between Hutchinson and Ponca City. Dedicated passenger service was provided until at least 1954, while mixed trains continued until at least 1961. As of 2025, the nearest passenger rail station is located in Hutchinson, where Amtrak's Southwest Chief stops once daily on a route from Chicago to Los Angeles.
