= Camp Concordia =

World War II POW camp in Kansas, US

Coordinates: 39.61°N 97.6428°W

- Concordia, Kansas
- Camp Concordia Circa 1945 (Courtesy Cloud County Historical Society)

Site information
- Open to the public: museum built inside building T-9

Location
- Location within Kansas
- Area: 640 acres

Site history
- Built: 1943
- Built for: US Army
- In use: 1945
- Materials: wood frame, Celotex, asphalt roll roofing

Camp Concordia was a prisoner-of-war camp operating from May 1943 to November 1945, located two miles north and one mile east of Concordia, Kansas. The camp was used primarily for German Army prisoners during World War II who had been captured in battles that took place in Africa.

Camp Concordia was the largest POW camp in Kansas, holding over 4,000 prisoners at its peak. It consisted of a complex of 300 buildings and was staffed by 800 United States soldiers. Uniquely it had a self-initiated reeducation program, the Prisoner of War University, later supported by the Special Projects Division. A few of the remaining structures form the core of a museum, opened in 2015.

== Geography ==
Camp Concordia is located in rural north-central Kansas, two miles north and one mile east of Concordia, Kansas, now 1557 Union Rd, Concordia, KS 66901. It stretches across 640 acres and lies at the junction of the Chicago Burlington & Quincy, the Union Pacific, and the Missouri Pacific Railroad.

== History ==
Camp Concordia was the first and largest of sixteen POW camps to be built in Kansas. Construction began in February, 1943. The camp was turned over to the US Army on May 1, 1943 and officially closed on November 8, 1945.

The camp consisted of 304 buildings including a 177 bed hospital, fire department, 5 warehouses, cold storage, and officers club, and barracks, mess halls and administrative buildings for both the German POWs and American soldiers. The camp cost $1,808,860, running $40,000 over budget. Warehouses were one story, wood frames, with a concrete foundation and floor, sided with Asbestos insulation called Celotex and roof covered with wood sheathing and asphalt roll roofing.

The camp held over 4,000 prisoners at its peak (one hear say source cites as high as 8,000 prisoners). It was staffed by 800 US soldiers.

The German prisoners of war in the United States arrived at Camp Concordia by train.

=== Activities ===
The Geneva Convention on Prisoners of War from 1929, which had never been put into action before, foresaw farm labor program only for enlisted soldiers at Camp Concordia and voluntary labor of officer POWs. However, very few officers volunteered for anything. Dedicated Nazis organized the camp mobbing those expressing anti-Nazi sentiments.

Initially violent episodes occurred as 50 of the first prisoners were Nazi leaders, so the Army transferred 44 out. At least two reported cases of executions are recorded, both were made by prisoners on fellow prisoners some of whom were Gestapo agents. When conclusive evidence arose, the offenders were tried and sentenced to the federal penitentiary at Leavenworth.

Early in 1944, representatives of the War Department and the State Department agreed to embark on a re-education program, Special Projects Division (SPD).(see German prisoners of war in the United States#Special Projects Division) On December 2, 1944, Captain Carl. C. Teufel arrived at Camp Concordia as designated Assistant to find that the German POW s had already self-initiated post- secondary school and that Anti-Nazis were highly educated, lawyers, teachers, ministers, teaching about 300 subjects, including English, twelve additional languages, electronics, theology, history, geography, government, engineering, medicine, arts, sciences, and vocational subjects. They created a partnership with the University of Kansas. Even the German Reich’s Ministry of Education approved the university concept and fifteen German and Austrian universities agreed to honor any courses. However, in the spring of 1945 more than 100 hard core Nazis had to be transferred out to Alva, Oklahoma. Overall the re-education program was deemed successful with a 88% participation in the summer of 1945.

=== Interaction between locals ===
Authorities believed the soldiers could provide useful labor for agriculture, and, almost immediately, some started working with local farmers.

According to Lowell May, president of the camp's preservation society, "Difficulties between POWs and local residents were few, and in fact friendships formed","Only a handful of escape attempts occurred, none successful." Life at the camp was easy compared with the war in Europe: Prisoners played outdoor sports, listened to band performances and took courses offered by the University of Kansas. One POW wrote home, that there were many people of German descent in Kansas, with whom one could converse easily.

=== Famous prisoners ===
- Karl Bracher, historian
- Harald Deilmann, architect and author
- Reinhard Mohn, owner of the transnational media corporation Bertelsmann AG

=== Return to Germany ===
The prisoners headed back to Germany in the autumn of 1945, some of them harboring pleasant memories of Kansas. Franz Kramer of Gundelfingen, Germany, said: "There was no reason to criticize American authorities. The prisoners felt that they were well treated. We learned a little of the American way of life and saw part of the vast country."

=== Later years ===
Once the POW camp closed, one of the buildings, Building T-9, was on a list acquired by the Federal Land Bank on June 7, 1947. In October 1947, the City of Concordia purchased 166.7 acres of camp acreage, including buildings, with the intent of establishing a park and re-locating the Cloud County fairgrounds to the site. Plans for the park never came to pass and the city eventually sold Building T-9 as well as other buildings and acreage. T-9 was subsequently used as a skating rink, hog farm, canoe factory, and during the 1960s, as storage for a horse racetrack called Thundercloud Park located on the camp property.

== The camp today ==
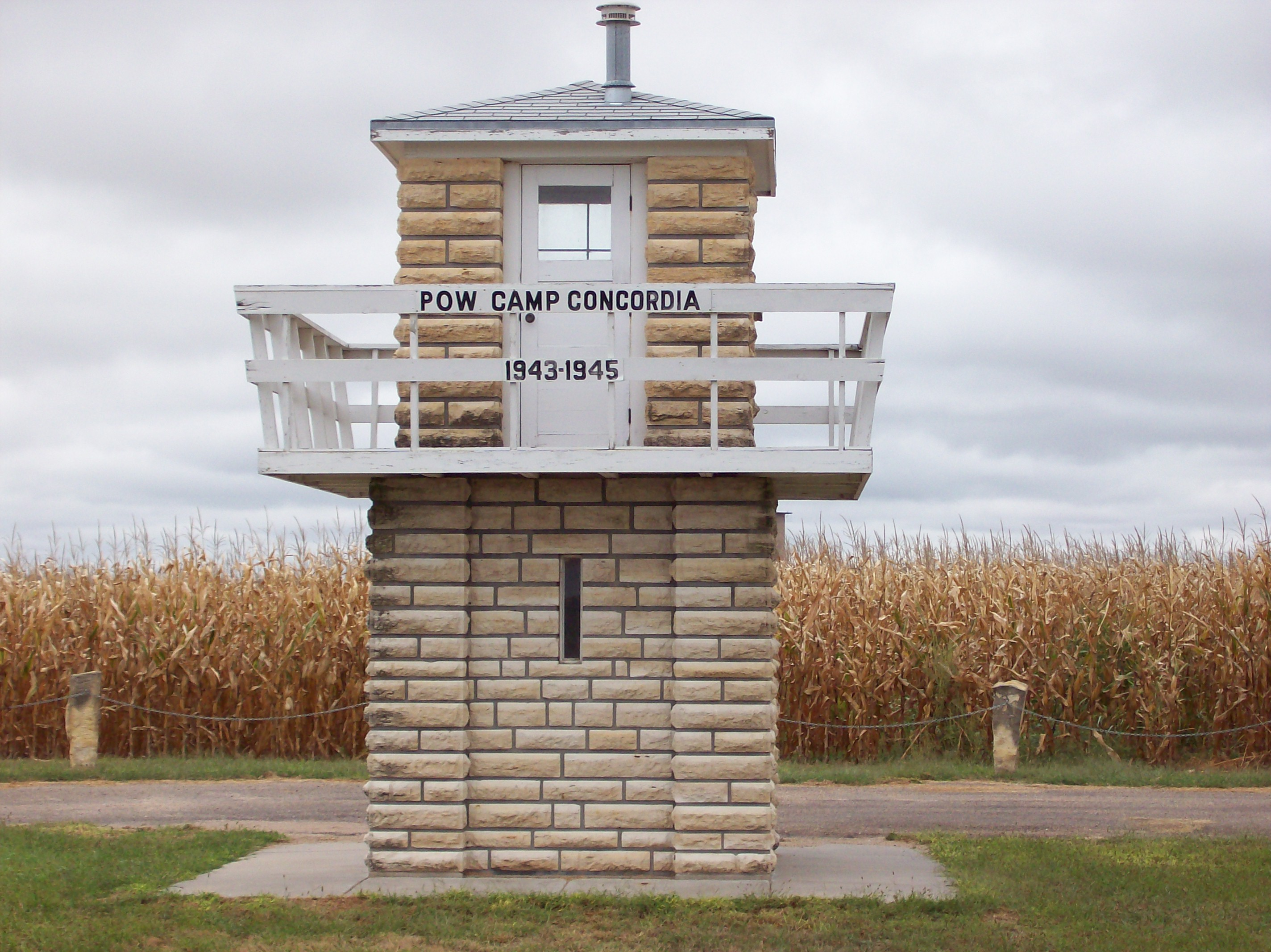
Restored Camp Concordia Guard Tower

Several structures of the camp remain, including a prison warehouse used for storage, an officers club, and a restored guard tower. Only the guard tower is easily accessible to the public. The original guardhouse remains and has been restored. Land is used primarily for farming, although some houses have been built on the land as well.

Camp records have been transferred and maintained at the Cloud County Historical Museum in Concordia. On display at the museum are also many items of interest about Camp Concordia including several original paintings created by prisoners at Camp Concordia.

In 2015, a museum was opened on site.

Today, correspondence continues between former POWs, their relatives and Concordia residents.
