= Oklahoma State Highway 132 =

Highway in Oklahoma

State Highway 132

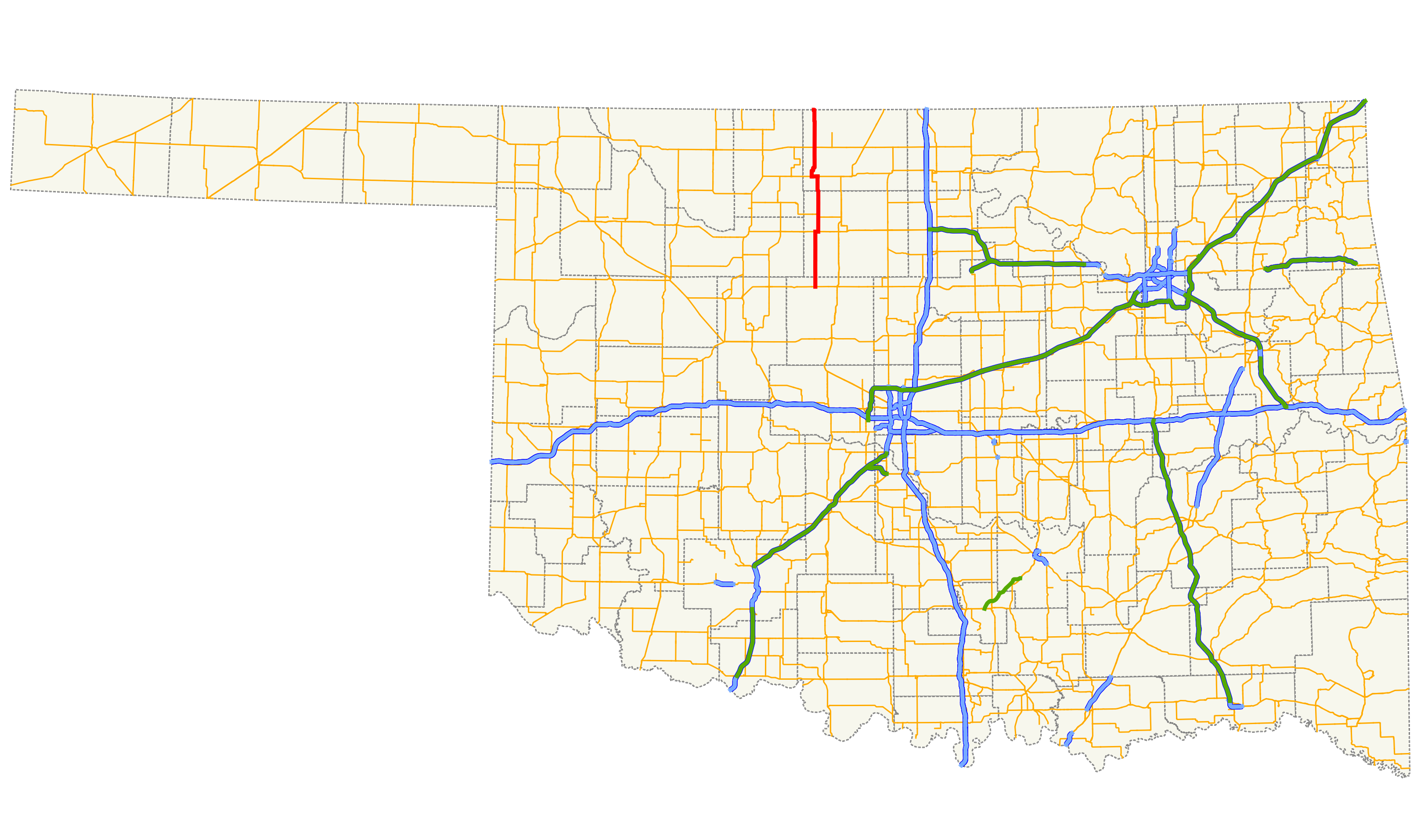

Route information
- Maintained by ODOT
- Length: 65.3 mi (105.1 km)
- Existed: July 14, 1956–present

Major junctions
- South end: SH-51 west of Hennessey
- US 60 / US 412 near Lahoma; US 64 in Nash
- North end: K-179 at the Kansas state line in Manchester

Location
- Country: United States
- State: Oklahoma

Highway system
- Oklahoma State Highway System; Interstate; US; State; Turnpikes
← SH-131	→ SH-133

State Highway 132, also known as SH-132, is a state highway in north-central Oklahoma. It connects State Highway 51 west of Hennessey to the Kansas state line near Manchester, and is 65.3 miles (105.1 km) long. It has no lettered spur routes.

SH-132 was originally added to the state highway system in 1956, when it ran between Carrier and U.S. Route 64 (US-64) east of Nash. It was extended further northward to the Kansas state line in 1958, and southward, to its current southern terminus, in 1962.

== Route description ==
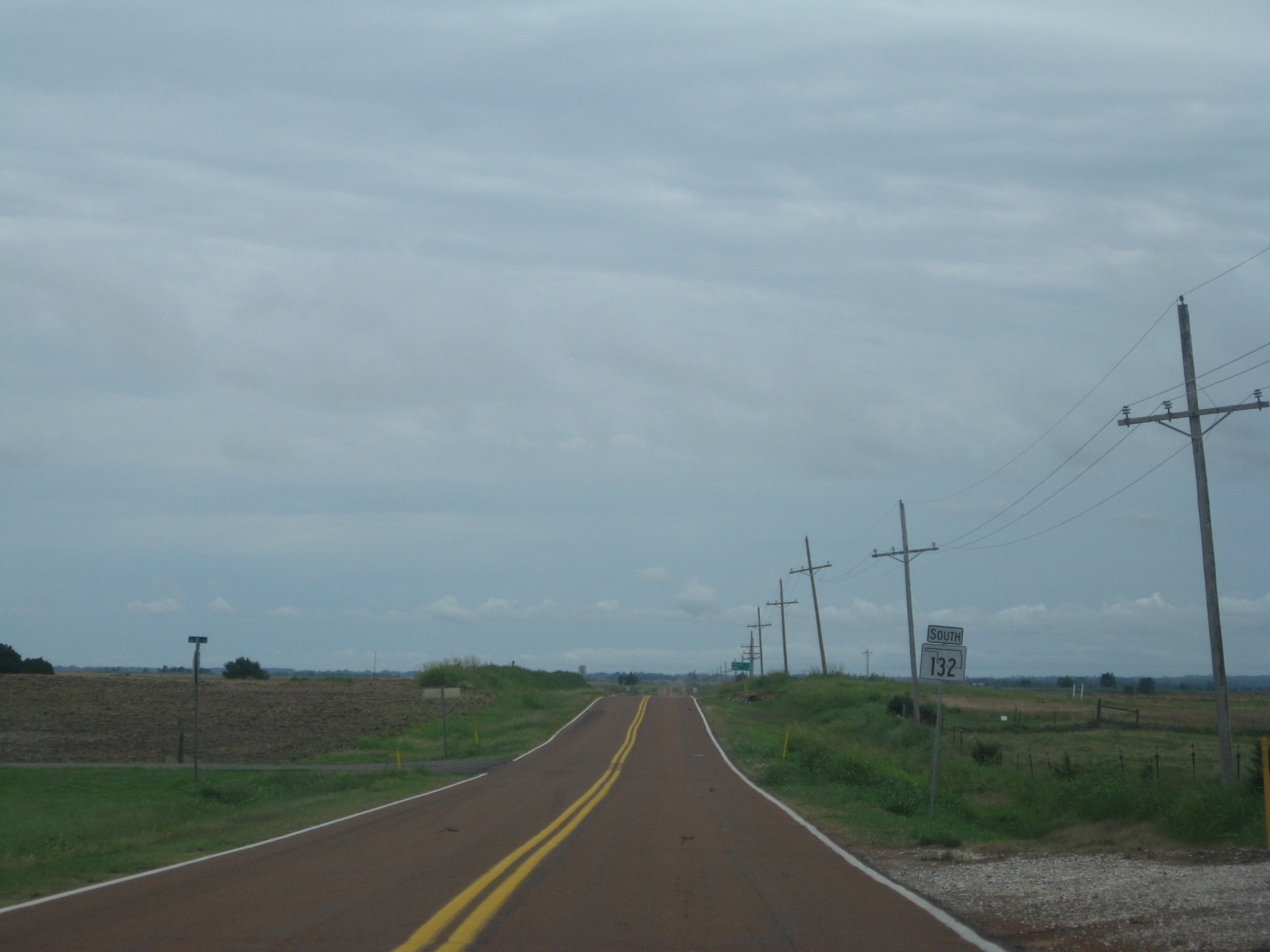
Southbound SH-132 in Grant County, just south of Manchester

SH-132 begins at State Highway 51 in rural Kingfisher County three miles (4.8 km) east of the unincorporated community of Lacey. It heads north from there, passing through unincorporated Cato before crossing into Garfield County. Approximately 4.5 miles (7.2 km) north of the county line, the highway cuts through Barr. Five miles (8.0 km) north of Barr, the road skirts the east edge of Drummond, where it crosses a Grainbelt Corporation railroad track. The highway then meets U.S. Highway 60/412 west of Enid.

SH-132 turns east and overlaps the U.S. routes for one mile (1.6 km), before splitting back off to the north. In Carrier, it briefly overlaps State Highway 45. North of Carrier, the highway crosses another railroad track, this one operated by Burlington Northern Santa Fe, before running to the west of Hillsdale. At the Garfield–Grant County line, the highway curves to the northwest before turning back to a due north heading in order to line up with Grant County's road grid.

SH-132's first numbered highway junction in Grant County is with US-64. SH-132 turns to the west, overlapping US-64 for two miles (3.2 km) before splitting off to the north in Nash. North of Nash, the highway passes through two sharp curves before crossing over the Salt Fork of the Arkansas River, and through two more sharp curves after the crossing. SH-132 then passes one mile (1.6 km) to the west of unincorporated Hawley. Its final highway junction in Oklahoma is with State Highway 11. From here, the highway continues due north, passing west of Sand Creek, Wakita, and Gibbon en route to Manchester. After passing through Manchester, the highway turns west along the Oklahoma–Kansas state line. The road then curves back to the north, fully entering the state of Kansas, and becomes K-179.

== History ==
SH-132 was first designated on July 14, 1956. Initially, the highway began at what was then SH-38 (present-day SH-45) in Carrier, proceeding north along its present-day route to end at US-64 east of Nash. On May 8, 1958, the portion of the route concurrent with US-64 into Nash, and from Nash to the Kansas state line north of Manchester, was added. The route did not appear on the official state highway map until the 1959 edition. At this time, portions of the route in Grant County, including from the Garfield–Grant county line to US-64 and a segment between Nash and Manchester, were unpaved. By 1961, the segment of highway north of SH-11 had been paved.

On July 2, 1962, SH-132 was extended to the south, reaching its present-day southern terminus. A minor realignment to the highway occurred in southern Grant County on January 7, 1963, the final change to SH-132's route. By 1963, the portion of highway in Grant County south of US-64 was paved, leaving only a section extending from north of Nash to SH-11 as unpaved. This section was paved by 1967.

== Junction list ==
County	Location	mi	km	Destinations	Notes
Kingfisher		0.00	0.00	SH-51 – Hennessey, Okeene	Southern terminus; road continues unpaved as 2790 Road
Garfield		19.0	30.6	US 60 / US 412 west – Fairview	Southern end of US-60/US-412 concurrency
Garfield		20.0	32.2	US 60 / US 412 east – Enid	Northern end of US-60/US-412 concurrency
Garfield		25.0	40.2	SH-45 east	Southern end of SH-45 concurrency
Garfield	Carrier	25.8	41.5	SH-45 west – Carrier	Northern end of SH-45 concurrency
Grant		39.1	62.9	US 64 east – Enid	Southern end of US-64 concurrency
Grant	Nash	41.1	66.1	US 64 west – Cherokee	Northern end of US-64 concurrency
Grant		52.0	83.7	SH-11 – Alva, Medford	
37th parallel north		65.3	105.1	K-179 north	Oklahoma–Kansas line; continuation into Kansas
1.000 mi = 1.609 km; 1.000 km = 0.621 mi: Concurrency terminus
