= Old Runnymede Church =

Historic church in Kansas, United States

- U.S. National Register of Historic Places
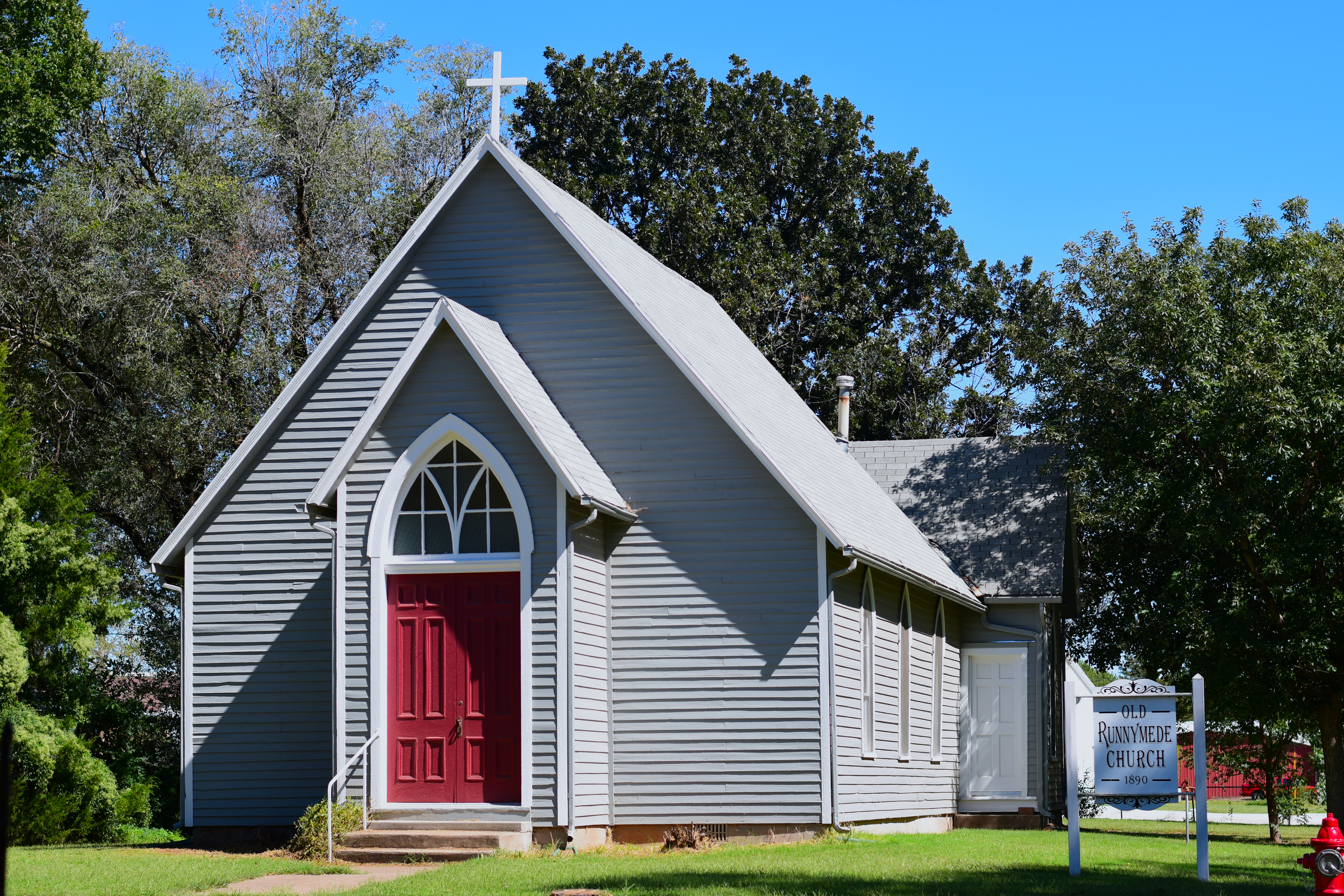

- Location within Kansas Location within the United States
- Location: 11th and Pine St., Harper, Kansas
- Coordinates: 37°17′25″N 98°1′49″W
- Area: 1 acre (0.40 ha)
- Built: 1890
- NRHP reference No.: 73000758
- Added to NRHP: February 6, 1973

The Old Runnymede Church, also known as St. Patrick's Episcopal Church, is a historic church at 11th and Pine Streets in Harper, Kansas. It was built in 1890 and added to the National Register in 1973.

It is significant as the church of "The Lost Town of Runnymede, Kas., Where Merry English Gentlemen Played at Farming". It was moved to its current location in 1893.
