= Harper Standpipe =

- U.S. National Register of Historic Places
- The Harper Standpipe in 2026

- Location within Kansas Location within the United States
- Location: 1012 Ash St., Harper, Kansas
- Coordinates: 37°17′10″N 98°01′50″W
- Area: Less than one acre
- Built: 1886–87
- NRHP reference No.: 100001288
- Added to NRHP: July 10, 2017

The Harper Standpipe is a standpipe built during 1886–87 in Harper, Kansas. It was listed on the National Register of Historic Places in 2017.

It was deemed notable "for its association with community planning and development and ... for its engineering method of construction. It is a unique example of a late 19th century standpipe with a base constructed of local materials and a standpipe constructed of riveted iron plates. The fish wind direction indicator on top still moves, and the standpipe is in current use as a part of the city water system."
