= Anthony Public Library =

- Anthony Public Carnegie Library
- U.S. National Register of Historic Places
- Location within Kansas Location within the United States
- Location: 104 N. Springfield, Anthony, Kansas
- Coordinates: 37°09′10″N 98°00′07″W
- Area: Less than one acre
- Built: 1911
- Built by: J.A. Mathien
- Architects: Mauran, John Lawrence; Anderson, Edwin A.
- Architectural style: Tudor Revival, Jacobethan
- MPS: Carnegie Libraries of Kansas TR
- NRHP reference No.: 87000954
- Added to NRHP: June 25, 1987

The current Anthony Public Library is located at 624 E. Main Street in Anthony, Kansas.

== History ==
Its former building located at 104 N. Springfield in Anthony, Kansas, is a Carnegie library which was built in 1911. It was listed on the National Register of Historic Places in 1987 as "Anthony Public (Carnegie) Library". It was funded by a $10,000 Carnegie grant received in 1908.

== Gallery ==
Old Anthony Public Library – b. 1911; pictured in 2026

New Anthony Public Library – b. 1995; pictured in 2026
