= Chaparral USD 361 =

Public school district in Kansas, United States

Address
- 124 N. Jennings Ave. Anthony, Kansas, 67003; United States
- Coordinates: 37°9′10″N 98°1′49″W

District information
- Type: Public
- Grades: K to 12
- Superintendent: Josh Swartz
- Schools: 3

Other information
- Website: usd361.org

Chaparral USD 361 is a public unified school district headquartered in Anthony, Kansas, United States. The district includes the communities of Anthony, Harper, Bluff City, Danville, Waldron, Crystal Springs, Duquoin, Freeport, Runnymede, and nearby rural areas.

== Schools ==
The school district operates the following schools:

- Chaparral Jr/Sr High, located between Anthony and Harper
- Anthony Elementary, located in Anthony
- Harper Elementary, located in Harper

== See also ==
- Kansas State Department of Education
- Kansas State High School Activities Association
- List of high schools in Kansas
- List of unified school districts in Kansas
