= Attica, Kansas =

City in Harper County, Kansas

- City
- Location within Harper County and Kansas

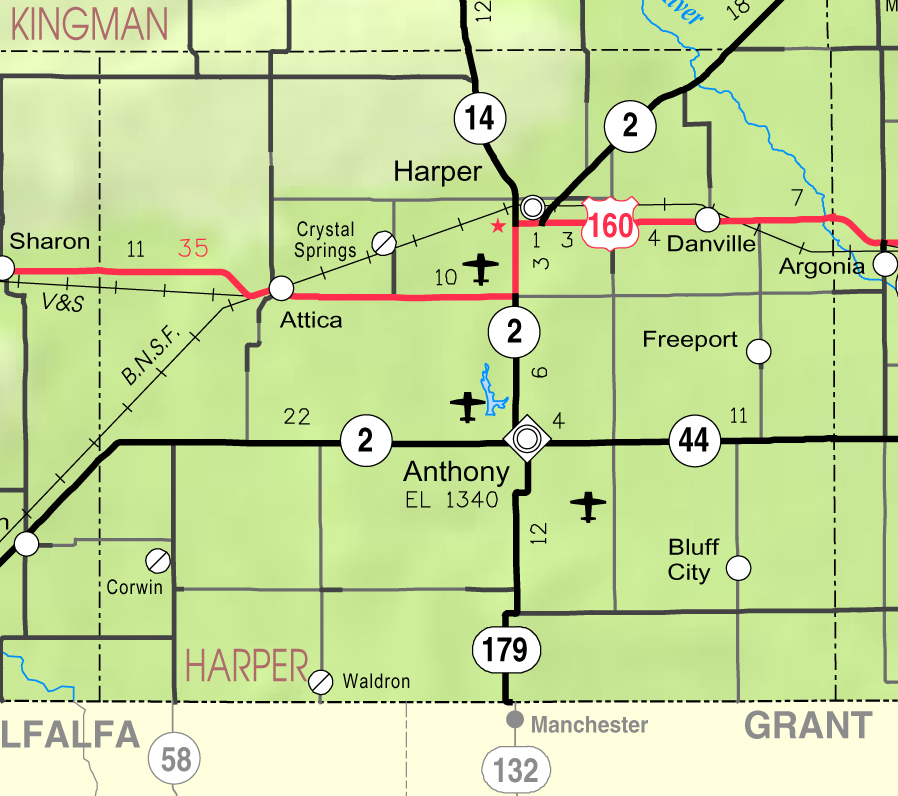
- KDOT map of Harper County (legend)
- Coordinates: 37°14′33″N 98°13′39″W
- Country: United States
- State: Kansas
- County: Harper
- Founded: 1884
- Incorporated: 1885
- Named for: Attica

Area
  - Total: 0.63 sq mi (1.64 km^{2})
  - Land: 0.63 sq mi (1.64 km^{2})
  - Water: 0 sq mi (0.00 km^{2})
- Elevation: 1,453 ft (443 m)

Population (2020)
  - Total: 516
  - Density: 815/sq mi (315/km^{2})
- Time zone: UTC-6 (CST)
  - Summer (DST): UTC-5 (CDT)
- ZIP Code: 67009
- Area code: 620
- FIPS code: 20-03100
- GNIS ID: 2394019
- Website: cityofatticaks.com

Attica is a city in Harper County, Kansas, United States. As of the 2020 census, the population of the city was 516. The town was named after the historical region of Attica, in Greece.

== History ==
Land for the community was purchased in late June 1884 and became the end of the Atchison, Topeka, and Santa Fe Railway. The town was incorporated on February 16, 1885, with a population of 1,500 people. The population grew further until the Cherokee Outlet in northern Oklahoma was opened by a Land run in 1893, at which point many people moved south to that territory.

Most of Attica is in Section 3 of Township 32 South of Range 9 West (S3-T32S-R9W) of the 6th Principal Meridian. The land for Attica was purchased from the Osage Land Trust, which also held the surrounding farmland. According to documents from Attica, the Osage Land Trust was held by the US government for the Osage tribe. Settlers could buy tracts of 160 acres (quarter-sections) for $1.25 / acre, and the money would go to the tribe. For reference, some of that land sold in 1909 for $12/acre.

On May 12, 2004, the town was damaged by an F2 tornado that received widespread coverage on local and national television.

== Geography ==
According to the United States Census Bureau, the city has a total area of 0.64 square miles (1.66 km^{2}), all land.

=== Climate ===
The climate in this area is characterized by hot, humid summers and generally mild to cool winters. According to the Köppen Climate Classification system, Attica has a humid subtropical climate, abbreviated "Cfa" on climate maps.

== Demographics ==
Historical population
Census	Pop.	Note	%±
1890	553		—
1900	311		−43.8%
1910	737		137.0%
1920	744		0.9%
1930	756		1.6%
1940	708		−6.3%
1950	622		−12.1%
1960	845		35.9%
1970	639		−24.4%
1980	730		14.2%
1990	716		−1.9%
2000	636		−11.2%
2010	626		−1.6%
2020	516		−17.6%
U.S. Decennial Census

=== 2020 census ===
The 2020 United States census counted 516 people, 218 households, and 127 families in Attica. The population density was 813.9 per square mile (314.2/km^{2}). There were 280 housing units at an average density of 441.6 per square mile (170.5/km^{2}). The racial makeup was 90.12% (465) white or European American (87.02% non-Hispanic white), 0.0% (0) black or African-American, 2.13% (11) Native American or Alaska Native, 0.39% (2) Asian, 0.0% (0) Pacific Islander or Native Hawaiian, 1.55% (8) from other races, and 5.81% (30) from two or more races. Hispanic or Latino of any race was 5.81% (30) of the population.

Of the 218 households, 31.7% had children under the age of 18; 39.9% were married couples living together; 28.4% had a female householder with no spouse or partner present. 38.5% of households consisted of individuals and 18.8% had someone living alone who was 65 years of age or older. The average household size was 2.5 and the average family size was 3.0. The percent of those with a bachelor's degree or higher was estimated to be 9.9% of the population.

23.1% of the population was under the age of 18, 6.6% from 18 to 24, 17.2% from 25 to 44, 24.0% from 45 to 64, and 29.1% who were 65 years of age or older. The median age was 47.6 years. For every 100 females, there were 106.4 males. For every 100 females ages 18 and older, there were 113.4 males.

The 2016–2020 5-year American Community Survey estimates show that the median household income was $36,359 (with a margin of error of +/- $3,984) and the median family income was $42,083 (+/- $10,067). Males had a median income of $40,938 (+/- $8,912) versus $21,750 (+/- $1,364) for females. The median income for those above 16 years old was $26,167 (+/- $3,414). Approximately, 14.7% of families and 18.1% of the population were below the poverty line, including 17.8% of those under the age of 18 and 17.4% of those ages 65 or over.

=== 2010 census ===
As of the census of 2010, there were 626 people, 246 households, and 155 families residing in the city. The population density was 978.1 inhabitants per square mile (377.6/km^{2}). There were 298 housing units at an average density of 465.6 per square mile (179.8/km^{2}). The racial makeup of the city was 95.7% White, 0.8% African American, 1.4% Native American, 1.3% from other races, and 0.8% from two or more races. Hispanic or Latino of any race were 4.2% of the population.

There were 246 households, of which 27.6% had children under the age of 18 living with them, 49.2% were married couples living together, 7.3% had a female householder with no husband present, 6.5% had a male householder with no wife present, and 37.0% were non-families. 32.9% of all households were made up of individuals, and 18.7% had someone living alone who was 65 years of age or older. The average household size was 2.36 and the average family size was 2.98.

The median age in the city was 42 years. 24.6% of residents were under the age of 18; 7.4% were between the ages of 18 and 24; 20.1% were from 25 to 44; 22.7% were from 45 to 64; and 25.2% were 65 years of age or older. The gender makeup of the city was 48.1% male and 51.9% female.

== Education ==
The community is served by Attica USD 511 public school district. The Attica High School mascot is Bulldogs.

== External list ==
- Attica - Official website
- Attica - Directory of Public Officials
