= Harper County, Kansas =

County in Kansas, United States

- County
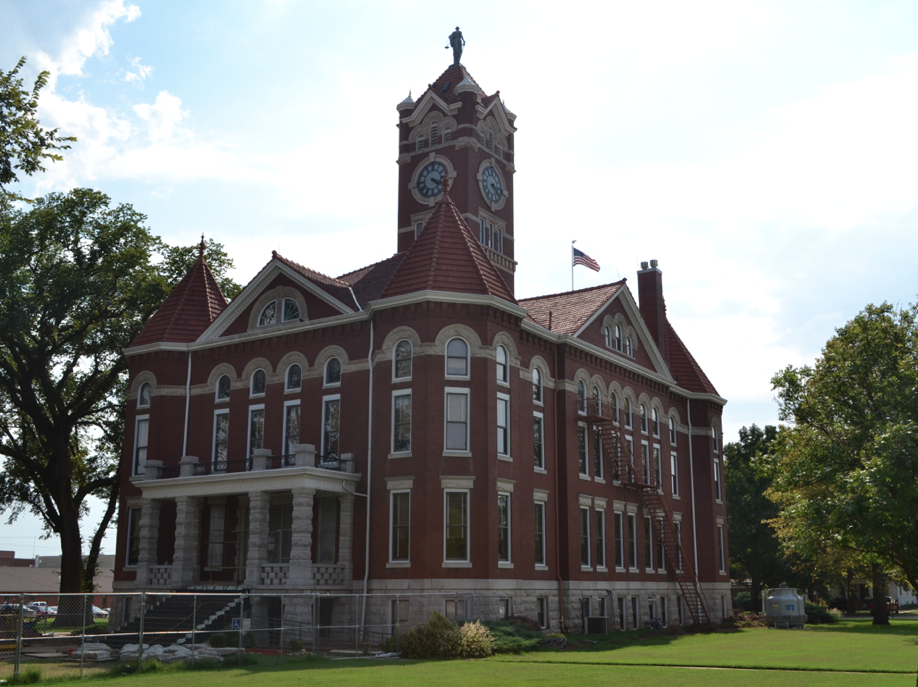
- Harper County Courthouse in Anthony (2015)

- Location within the U.S. state of Kansas
- Coordinates: 37°12′N 98°05′W
- Country: United States
- State: Kansas
- Founded: February 26, 1867
- Named for: Marion Harper
- Seat: Anthony
- Largest city: Anthony

Area
  - Total: 803 sq mi (2,080 km^{2})
  - Land: 801 sq mi (2,070 km^{2})
  - Water: 1.5 sq mi (3.9 km^{2}) 0.2%

Population (2020)
  - Total: 5,485
  - Estimate (2025): 5,370 ▼
  - Density: 6.8/sq mi (2.6/km^{2})
- Time zone: UTC−6 (Central)
  - Summer (DST): UTC−5 (CDT)
- Area code: 620
- Congressional district: 4th
- Website: HarperCountyKS.gov

Harper County is a county located in the U.S. state of Kansas. Its county seat and most populous city is Anthony. As of the 2020 census, the county population was 5,485. The county was named for Sergeant Marion Harper of the 2nd Kansas Cavalry, who died in battle during the Civil War.

== History ==
=== Early history ===
For many millennia, the Great Plains of North America was inhabited by nomadic Native Americans. From the 16th century to 18th century, the Kingdom of France claimed ownership of large parts of North America. In 1762, after the French and Indian War, France secretly ceded New France to Spain, per the Treaty of Fontainebleau.

=== 19th century ===
In 1802, Spain returned most of the land to France, but keeping title to about 7,500 square miles. In 1803, most of the land for modern day Kansas was acquired by the United States from France as part of the 828,000 square mile Louisiana Purchase for 2.83 cents per acre.

In 1854, the Kansas Territory was organized, then in 1861 Kansas became the 34th U.S. state. In 1867, Harper County was established.

The original organization of Harper County was one of the largest frauds in county government. In 1873, a group of three men organized Harper County, designating the then fictitious city of "Bluff City" as the county seat. The petition for organization used several names out of a Cincinnati city directory to represent as residents of Harper County. In 1874, the state attorney general investigated, and found not a single resident of the county. The "founders" of the county had sold $40,000 worth of bonds.

Harper County was settled starting in 1877, and the county was organized for a second time in 1878 by the Glenn and Robinson families. Since Bluff City could not be shown to have existed, Anthony was designated as the temporary county seat. In an election in 1879, Anthony won as county seat even though 2,960 votes were cast in a county with 800 legal voters.

=== 21st century ===
Due to new and high-paying jobs at area oil fields and wind farms, Harper County experienced an economic boom; as of 2012, rental housing and office space in towns such as Danville, Harper, and Anthony had more than quadrupled in price, in properties ranging from double-wide trailers to a Carnegie library. However, by 2016, the oil fracking boom had largely played out and the economies of Harper and adjacent counties suffered under the impact. Earthquakes, due to induced seismicity from injection wells, had also substantially reduced in frequency and intensity, due to a Kansas Corporation Commission order mandating cutbacks in volumes and pressures. SandRidge Energy, which along with Chesapeake Energy was one of the two major producers in Harper county, appealed the order, but soon went into bankruptcy.

== Geography ==
According to the U.S. Census Bureau, the county has a total area of 803 square miles (2,080 km^{2}), of which 801 square miles (2,070 km^{2}) is land and 1.5 square miles (3.9 km^{2}) (0.2%) is water.

=== Adjacent counties ===
- Kingman County (north)
- Sumner County (east)
- Grant County, Oklahoma (southeast)
- Alfalfa County, Oklahoma (southwest)
- Barber County (west)

== Demographics ==
Historical population
Census	Pop.	Note	%±
1880	4,133		—
1890	13,266		221.0%
1900	10,310		−22.3%
1910	14,748		43.0%
1920	13,656		−7.4%
1930	12,823		−6.1%
1940	12,068		−5.9%
1950	10,263		−15.0%
1960	9,541		−7.0%
1970	7,871		−17.5%
1980	7,778		−1.2%
1990	7,124		−8.4%
2000	6,536		−8.3%
2010	6,034		−7.7%
2020	5,485		−9.1%
2025 (est.)	5,370	▼	−2.1%
U.S. Decennial Census; 1790-1960 1900-1990; 1990-2000 2010-2020

=== Racial and ethnic composition ===
Harper County, Kansas – Racial and ethnic composition Note: the US Census treats Hispanic/Latino as an ethnic category. This table excludes Latinos from the racial categories and assigns them to a separate category. Hispanics/Latinos may be of any race.
Race / Ethnicity (NH = Non-Hispanic)	Pop 1980	Pop 1990	Pop 2000	Pop 2010	Pop 2020	% 1980	% 1990	% 2000	% 2010	% 2020
White alone (NH)	7,653	6,955	6,322	5,582	4,714	98.39%	97.63%	96.73%	92.51%	85.94%
Black or African American alone (NH)	24	13	15	21	16	0.31%	0.18%	0.23%	0.35%	0.29%
Native American or Alaska Native alone (NH)	18	46	52	59	74	0.23%	0.65%	0.80%	0.98%	1.35%
Asian alone (NH)	5	5	9	5	15	0.06%	0.07%	0.14%	0.08%	0.27%
Native Hawaiian or Pacific Islander alone (NH)	x	x	0	1	2	x	x	0.00%	0.02%	0.04%
Other race alone (NH)	3	0	0	1	4	0.04%	0.00%	0.00%	0.02%	0.07%
Mixed race or Multiracial (NH)	x	x	68	67	235	x	x	1.04%	1.11%	4.28%
Hispanic or Latino (any race)	75	105	70	298	425	0.96%	1.47%	1.07%	4.94%	7.75%
Total	7,778	7,124	6,536	6,034	5,485	100.00%	100.00%	100.00%	100.00%	100.00%

=== 2020 census ===
As of the 2020 census, the county had a population of 5,485. The median age was 43.1 years. 24.0% of residents were under the age of 18 and 23.7% of residents were 65 years of age or older. For every 100 females there were 100.8 males, and for every 100 females age 18 and over there were 99.4 males age 18 and over. 0.0% of residents lived in urban areas, while 100.0% lived in rural areas.

The racial makeup of the county was 88.0% White, 0.3% Black or African American, 1.8% American Indian and Alaska Native, 0.3% Asian, 0.1% Native Hawaiian and Pacific Islander, 3.7% from some other race, and 5.8% from two or more races. Hispanic or Latino residents of any race comprised 7.7% of the population.

There were 2,347 households in the county, of which 28.2% had children under the age of 18 living with them and 25.1% had a female householder with no spouse or partner present. About 33.1% of all households were made up of individuals and 15.9% had someone living alone who was 65 years of age or older.

There were 3,027 housing units, of which 22.5% were vacant. Among occupied housing units, 70.9% were owner-occupied and 29.1% were renter-occupied. The homeowner vacancy rate was 3.0% and the rental vacancy rate was 21.7%.

=== 2000 census ===
As of the 2000 census, there were 6,536 people, 2,773 households, and 1,807 families residing in the county. The population density was 8 people per square mile (3.1 people/km^{2}). There were 3,270 housing units at an average density of 4 per square mile (1.5/km^{2}). The racial makeup of the county was 97.23% White, 0.83% Native American, 0.23% Black or African American, 0.14% Asian, 0.02% Pacific Islander, 0.38% from other races, and 1.18% from two or more races. Hispanic or Latino of any race were 1.07% of the population.

There were 2,773 households, out of which 27.70% had children under the age of 18 living with them, 55.30% were married couples living together, 6.90% had a female householder with no husband present, and 34.80% were non-families. 32.10% of all households were made up of individuals, and 17.90% had someone living alone who was 65 years of age or older. The average household size was 2.30 and the average family size was 2.90.

In the county, the population was spread out, with 24.70% under the age of 18, 6.60% from 18 to 24, 22.00% from 25 to 44, 23.50% from 45 to 64, and 23.20% who were 65 years of age or older. The median age was 43 years. For every 100 females there were 93.70 males. For every 100 females age 18 and over, there were 91.40 males.

The median income for a household in the county was $29,776, and the median income for a family was $39,866. Males had a median income of $27,869 versus $20,000 for females. The per capita income for the county was $16,368. About 8.50% of families and 11.60% of the population were below the poverty line, including 15.70% of those under age 18 and 7.70% of those age 65 or over.

== Government ==
=== Presidential elections ===
Presidential election results

United States presidential election results for Harper County, Kansas
Year	Republican		Democratic		Third party(ies)	
Year	No.	%	No.	%	No.	%
1888	1,490	48.79%	940	30.78%	624	20.43%
1892	1,288	38.57%	0	0.00%	2,051	61.43%
1896	812	37.37%	1,332	61.30%	29	1.33%
1900	1,190	47.04%	1,261	49.84%	79	3.12%
1904	1,459	61.72%	597	25.25%	308	13.03%
1908	1,490	48.46%	1,404	45.66%	181	5.89%
1912	365	11.63%	1,274	40.60%	1,499	47.77%
1916	1,797	36.79%	2,648	54.22%	439	8.99%
1920	2,593	61.65%	1,486	35.33%	127	3.02%
1924	2,280	53.25%	1,321	30.85%	681	15.90%
1928	3,712	77.85%	1,005	21.08%	51	1.07%
1932	2,116	41.13%	2,860	55.59%	169	3.28%
1936	2,441	41.70%	3,391	57.93%	22	0.38%
1940	3,205	55.73%	2,478	43.09%	68	1.18%
1944	2,849	63.76%	1,573	35.21%	46	1.03%
1948	2,702	59.25%	1,752	38.42%	106	2.32%
1952	3,575	78.62%	927	20.39%	45	0.99%
1956	3,111	69.99%	1,311	29.49%	23	0.52%
1960	3,158	68.33%	1,439	31.13%	25	0.54%
1964	1,969	51.68%	1,813	47.59%	28	0.73%
1968	2,351	63.99%	1,015	27.63%	308	8.38%
1972	2,628	75.71%	729	21.00%	114	3.28%
1976	1,777	50.00%	1,681	47.30%	96	2.70%
1980	2,254	64.18%	990	28.19%	268	7.63%
1984	2,521	73.09%	893	25.89%	35	1.01%
1988	1,941	59.39%	1,235	37.79%	92	2.82%
1992	1,371	40.59%	845	25.01%	1,162	34.40%
1996	1,941	61.44%	836	26.46%	382	12.09%
2000	2,076	67.95%	869	28.45%	110	3.60%
2004	2,154	73.52%	727	24.81%	49	1.67%
2008	1,999	71.49%	736	26.32%	61	2.18%
2012	1,759	73.63%	550	23.02%	80	3.35%
2016	1,996	77.42%	393	15.24%	189	7.33%
2020	2,168	80.96%	461	17.21%	49	1.83%
2024	2,072	81.10%	437	17.10%	46	1.80%

=== Laws ===
Following amendment to the Kansas Constitution in 1986, Harper County remained a prohibition, or "dry", county until 2006, when voters approved the sale of alcoholic liquor by the individual drink with a 30% food sales requirement.

== Education ==
=== Unified school districts ===
- Chaparral USD 361
- Attica USD 511

== Communities ==
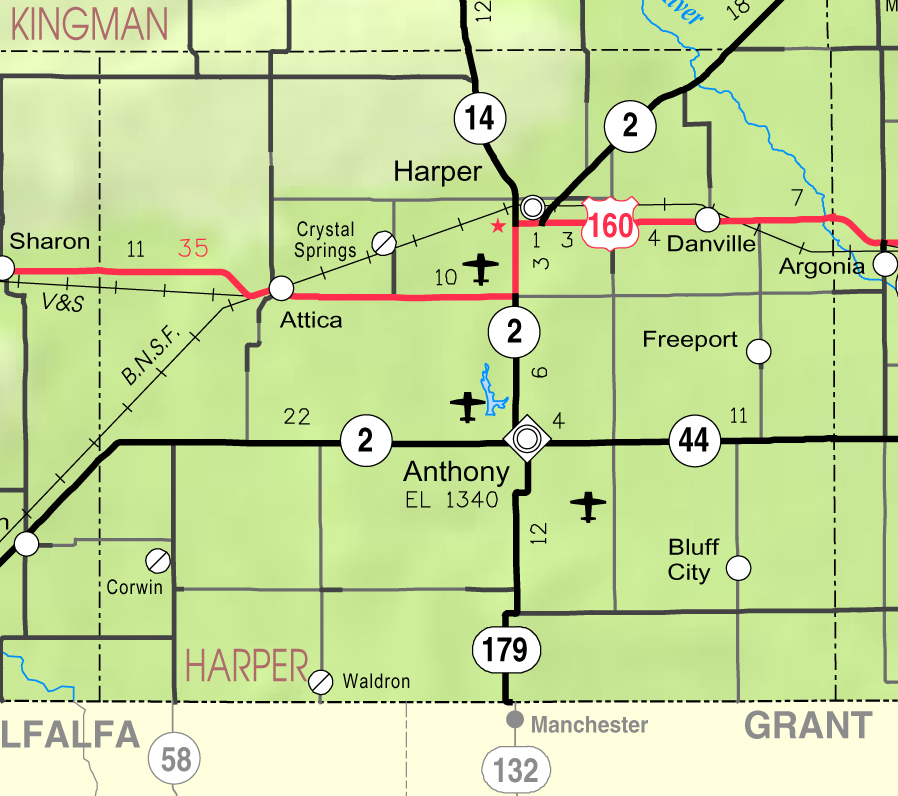
2005 map of Harper County (map legend)

List of townships / incorporated cities / unincorporated communities / extinct former communities within Harper County.

=== Cities ===
- Anthony (county seat)
- Attica
- Bluff City
- Danville
- Harper
- Waldron

=== Unincorporated communities ===
- Corwin
- Crystal Springs
- Duquoin
- Freeport
- Runnymede

=== Ghost towns ===
- Albion
- Crisfield
- Midway
- Ruella
- Shook
- Yankton

=== Townships ===
The townships of Harper County (Townships are numbers in counter-clockwise order, with Township 1 highlighted in red).

Harper County is divided into six townships. The cities of Anthony and Harper are considered governmentally independent and are excluded from the census figures for the townships. In the following table, the population center is the largest city (or cities) included in that township's population total, if it is of a significant size.

Harper County is one of only four counties in Kansas that have numbered, not named, townships. The other three are Morris County, Pratt County, and Rooks County.

Township	FIPS	Population center	Population	Population density /km^{2} (/sq mi)	Land area km^{2} (sq mi)	Water area km^{2} (sq mi)	Water %	Geographic coordinates
Township 1	71201		1,000	2 (6)	468 (181)	1 (0)	0.12%	37°15′23″N 98°14′0″W
Township 2	71205		144	0 (1)	363 (140)	1 (0)	0.23%	37°4′23″N 98°14′22″W
Township 3	71209		394	1 (3)	383 (148)	2 (1)	0.44%	37°7′58″N 98°2′7″W
Township 4	71213		232	1 (2)	297 (115)	0 (0)	0.06%	37°7′2″N 97°51′45″W
Township 5	71217		463	2 (4)	277 (107)	0 (0)	0.16%	37°15′47″N 97°56′23″W
Township 6	71221		296	1 (3)	280 (108)	0 (0)	0.06%	37°20′26″N 97°58′17″W
Sources: "Census 2000 U.S. Gazetteer Files". U.S. Census Bureau, Geography Division. Archived from the original on August 2, 2002.

== See also ==
- National Register of Historic Places listings in Harper County, Kansas

Community information for Kansas

- Kansas locations by per capita income
- List of counties in Kansas
- List of townships in Kansas
- List of cities in Kansas
- List of unincorporated communities in Kansas
- List of ghost towns in Kansas
- Dry counties
