= Manchester, Oklahoma =

- Town
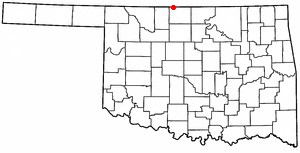
- Location of Manchester, Oklahoma
- Coordinates: 36°59′40″N 98°02′06″W
- Country: United States
- State: Oklahoma
- County: Grant

Area
  - Total: 0.24 sq mi (0.63 km^{2})
  - Land: 0.24 sq mi (0.63 km^{2})
  - Water: 0 sq mi (0.00 km^{2})
- Elevation: 1,286 ft (392 m)

Population (2020)
  - Total: 90
  - Density: 371.5/sq mi (143.45/km^{2})
- Time zone: UTC-6 (Central (CST))
  - Summer (DST): UTC-5 (CDT)
- ZIP code: 73758
- Area code: 580
- FIPS code: 40-46000
- GNIS feature ID: 2412938

Manchester is a town in Grant County, Oklahoma, United States. As of the 2020 census, Manchester had a population of 90.

== Geography ==
Manchester is located in northwest Grant County just south of the Oklahoma-Kansas border along SH-132. The Atchison, Topeka and Santa Fe Railroad passes through the town.

According to the United States Census Bureau, the town has a total area of 0.2 square miles (0.52 km^{2}), all land.

== Demographics ==
Historical population
Census	Pop.	Note	%±
1900	158		—
1910	271		71.5%
1920	237		−12.5%
1930	281		18.6%
1940	269		−4.3%
1950	190		−29.4%
1960	162		−14.7%
1970	165		1.9%
1980	146		−11.5%
1990	106		−27.4%
2000	104		−1.9%
2010	103		−1.0%
2020	90		−12.6%
U.S. Decennial Census

=== 2020 census ===
As of the 2020 census, Manchester had a population of 90. The median age was 47.0 years. 23.3% of residents were under the age of 18 and 24.4% of residents were 65 years of age or older. For every 100 females there were 100.0 males, and for every 100 females age 18 and over there were 91.7 males age 18 and over.

0.0% of residents lived in urban areas, while 100.0% lived in rural areas.

There were 45 households in Manchester, of which 26.7% had children under the age of 18 living in them. Of all households, 48.9% were married-couple households, 17.8% were households with a male householder and no spouse or partner present, and 28.9% were households with a female householder and no spouse or partner present. About 37.8% of all households were made up of individuals and 20.0% had someone living alone who was 65 years of age or older.

There were 48 housing units, of which 6.2% were vacant. The homeowner vacancy rate was 0.0% and the rental vacancy rate was 0.0%.

Racial composition as of the 2020 census
Race	Number	Percent
White	85	94.4%
Black or African American	3	3.3%
American Indian and Alaska Native	0	0.0%
Asian	0	0.0%
Native Hawaiian and Other Pacific Islander	0	0.0%
Some other race	2	2.2%
Two or more races	0	0.0%
Hispanic or Latino (of any race)	3	3.3%

=== 2000 census ===
As of the census of 2000, there were 104 people, 47 households, and 29 families residing in the town. The population density was 440.0 inhabitants per square mile (169.9/km^{2}). There were 58 housing units at an average density of 245.4 per square mile (94.7/km^{2}). The racial makeup of the town was 99.04% White, and 0.96% from two or more races.

There were 47 households, out of which 29.8% had children under the age of 18 living with them, 57.4% were married couples living together, 2.1% had a female householder with no husband present, and 36.2% were non-families. 34.0% of all households were made up of individuals, and 17.0% had someone living alone who was 65 years of age or older. The average household size was 2.21 and the average family size was 2.87.

In the town, the population was spread out, with 21.2% under the age of 18, 3.8% from 18 to 24, 30.8% from 25 to 44, 25.0% from 45 to 64, and 19.2% who were 65 years of age or older. The median age was 44 years. For every 100 females, there were 92.6 males. For every 100 females age 18 and over, there were 100.0 males.

The median income for a household in the town was $27,500, and the median income for a family was $36,250. Males had a median income of $21,250 versus $15,500 for females. The per capita income for the town was $12,760. There were 5.6% of families and 6.7% of the population living below the poverty line, including no under eighteens and 23.1% of those over 64.

== Education ==
The school district is Medford Public Schools.

It was formerly in Wakita Public Schools, which merged into Medford Public Schools in 2011.

== Notable people ==
- Mark Dinning (1933-1986), singer, born here
