= Anthony, Kansas =

City in Harper County, Kansas

- City and County seat
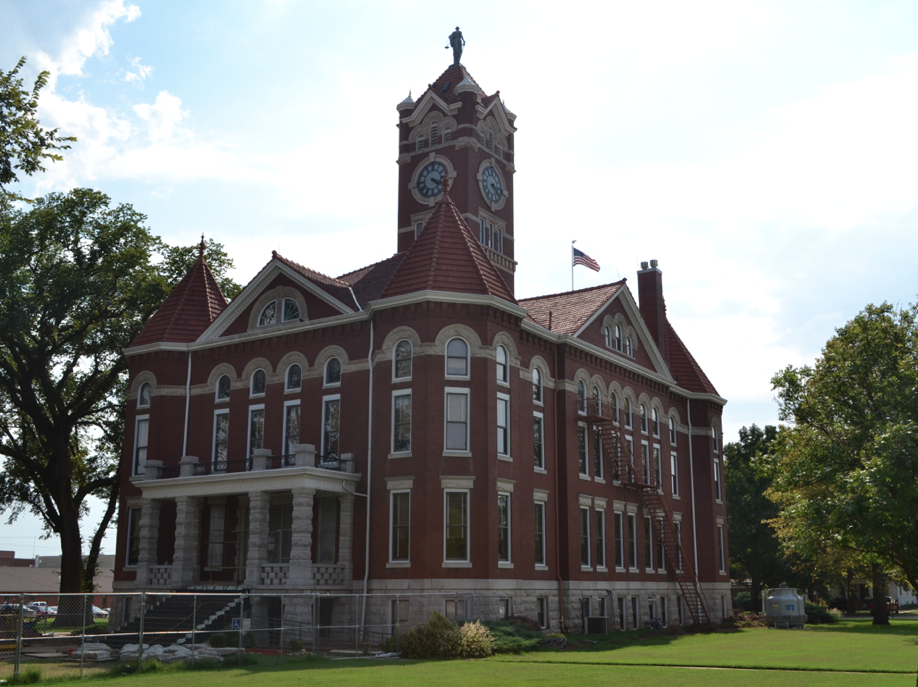
- Harper County Courthouse (2015)

- Location within Harper County and Kansas

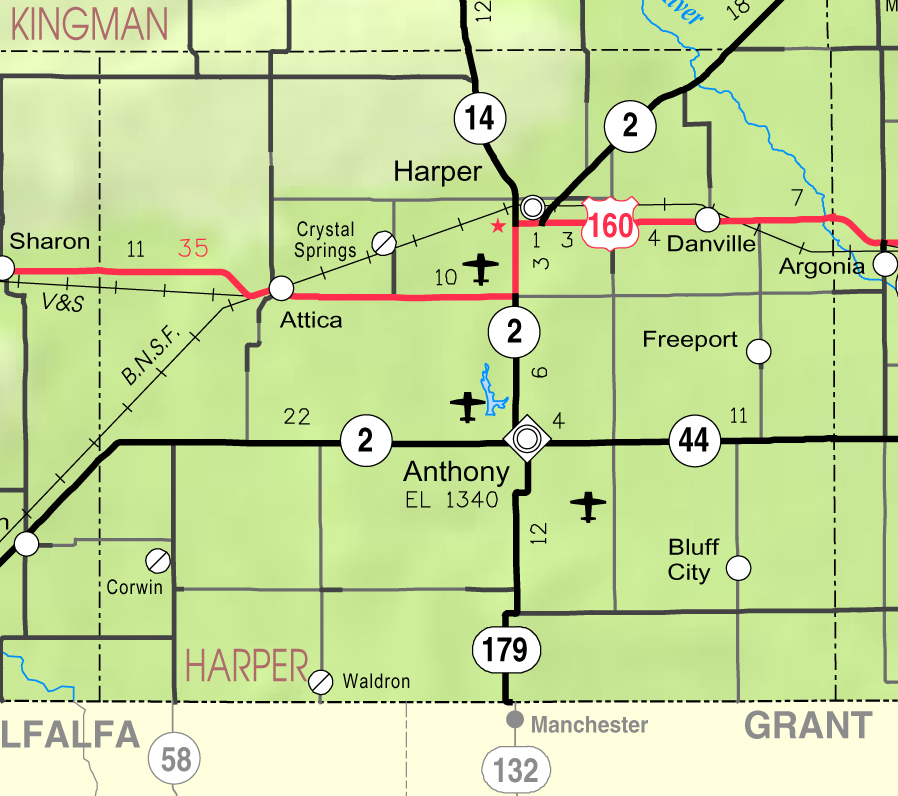
- KDOT map of Harper County (legend)
- Coordinates: 37°09′32″N 98°02′31″W
- Country: United States
- State: Kansas
- County: Harper
- Founded: 1870s
- Platted: 1878
- Incorporated: 1879
- Named for: George Anthony

Area
  - Total: 3.21 sq mi (8.31 km^{2})
  - Land: 3.03 sq mi (7.85 km^{2})
  - Water: 0.18 sq mi (0.46 km^{2})
- Elevation: 1,352 ft (412 m)

Population (2020)
  - Total: 2,108
  - Density: 696/sq mi (269/km^{2})
- Time zone: UTC-6 (CST)
  - Summer (DST): UTC-5 (CDT)
- ZIP Code: 67003
- Area code: 620
- FIPS code: 20-01975
- GNIS ID: 485540
- Website: anthonykansas.org

Anthony is a city in and the county seat of Harper County, Kansas, United States. As of the 2020 census, the population of the city was 2,108.

== History ==
The Anthony townsite was laid out in 1878. The city was named after the 7th governor of Kansas, George T. Anthony who was in office at the time. Following the reorganization of Harper County in 1878 following the original fraudulent organization in 1873, Anthony was designated the temporary county seat, as Bluff City, designated county seat of the fraudulent county organization, did not exist at the time. In 1879, a county seat election was held, and Anthony won over Harper City even though 2,960 ballots were cast with 800 legal voters in the county.

Anthony existed at the intersection of the St. Louis-San Francisco Railroad and the Missouri Pacific Railway since at least 1891. Three additional railroads came through town by 1912: the Choctaw Northern Railroad (by then owned by the Chicago, Rock Island and Pacific Railroad), the Kansas City, Mexico and Orient Railroad and the Kansas Southwestern Railway (the latter two becoming part of the Atchison, Topeka and Santa Fe Railway. However, rail abandonments began around 1986, leaving Anthony without any rail service by 2000.

Anthony underwent a debt crisis during the railway boom of the mid-to-late 1800s, issuing bonds for railroads which it could not afford. Although the town's value fell from $512,000 in 1889 to $171,000 in 1898, and its population halved, it's debt increased from $17,434,347 to $36,805,599. In 1897, the town declared itself bankrupt and repudiated bond debts worth $32.4 million.

== Geography ==
According to the United States Census Bureau, the city has a total area of 3.31 square miles (8.57 km^{2}), of which 3.13 square miles (8.11 km^{2}) is land and 0.18 square miles (0.47 km^{2}) is water.

=== Climate ===
The climate in this area is characterized by hot, humid summers and generally mild to cool winters. According to the Köppen Climate Classification system, Anthony has a humid subtropical climate, abbreviated "Cfa" on climate maps.

Climate data for Anthony, Kansas, 1991–2020 normals, extremes 1906–present
Month	Jan	Feb	Mar	Apr	May	Jun	Jul	Aug	Sep	Oct	Nov	Dec	Year
Record high °F (°C)	80 (27)	90 (32)	98 (37)	99 (37)	106 (41)	113 (45)	115 (46)	115 (46)	111 (44)	100 (38)	88 (31)	85 (29)	115 (46)
Mean maximum °F (°C)	67.4 (19.7)	72.8 (22.7)	80.9 (27.2)	86.6 (30.3)	92.9 (33.8)	98.7 (37.1)	103.1 (39.5)	102.1 (38.9)	97.5 (36.4)	89.2 (31.8)	76.8 (24.9)	66.7 (19.3)	104.4 (40.2)
Mean daily maximum °F (°C)	44.7 (7.1)	49.2 (9.6)	59.1 (15.1)	68.3 (20.2)	77.5 (25.3)	88.0 (31.1)	92.9 (33.8)	90.9 (32.7)	83.3 (28.5)	70.7 (21.5)	57.4 (14.1)	46.0 (7.8)	69.0 (20.6)
Daily mean °F (°C)	33.6 (0.9)	37.4 (3.0)	46.8 (8.2)	55.9 (13.3)	66.4 (19.1)	76.6 (24.8)	81.4 (27.4)	79.5 (26.4)	71.6 (22.0)	58.8 (14.9)	45.8 (7.7)	35.6 (2.0)	57.5 (14.1)
Mean daily minimum °F (°C)	22.4 (−5.3)	25.6 (−3.6)	34.5 (1.4)	43.6 (6.4)	55.2 (12.9)	65.1 (18.4)	69.9 (21.1)	68.0 (20.0)	59.8 (15.4)	46.9 (8.3)	34.3 (1.3)	25.2 (−3.8)	45.9 (7.7)
Mean minimum °F (°C)	7.5 (−13.6)	10.4 (−12.0)	17.8 (−7.9)	29.6 (−1.3)	41.9 (5.5)	54.7 (12.6)	61.8 (16.6)	59.7 (15.4)	46.1 (7.8)	31.1 (−0.5)	19.0 (−7.2)	10.4 (−12.0)	3.2 (−16.0)
Record low °F (°C)	−15 (−26)	−20 (−29)	−3 (−19)	13 (−11)	26 (−3)	43 (6)	49 (9)	43 (6)	30 (−1)	12 (−11)	7 (−14)	−15 (−26)	−20 (−29)
Average precipitation inches (mm)	1.00 (25)	1.23 (31)	2.47 (63)	3.28 (83)	4.79 (122)	4.96 (126)	3.68 (93)	3.23 (82)	2.56 (65)	2.89 (73)	1.63 (41)	1.42 (36)	33.14 (840)
Average snowfall inches (cm)	2.4 (6.1)	2.8 (7.1)	2.1 (5.3)	0.1 (0.25)	0.0 (0.0)	0.0 (0.0)	0.0 (0.0)	0.0 (0.0)	0.0 (0.0)	0.1 (0.25)	0.5 (1.3)	3.1 (7.9)	11.1 (28.2)
Average precipitation days (≥ 0.01 in)	3.7	4.8	6.8	7.3	9.7	8.8	7.6	7.7	5.7	6.3	4.6	5.0	78.0
Average snowy days (≥ 0.1 in)	1.6	1.6	0.8	0.1	0.0	0.0	0.0	0.0	0.0	0.1	0.4	1.7	6.3
Source 1: NOAA
Source 2: National Weather Service

== Demographics ==
Historical population
Census	Pop.	Note	%±
1880	345		—
1890	1,806		423.5%
1900	1,179		−34.7%
1910	2,669		126.4%
1920	2,740		2.7%
1930	2,947		7.6%
1940	2,873		−2.5%
1950	2,792		−2.8%
1960	2,744		−1.7%
1970	2,653		−3.3%
1980	2,661		0.3%
1990	2,516		−5.4%
2000	2,440		−3.0%
2010	2,269		−7.0%
2020	2,108		−7.1%
U.S. Decennial Census

=== 2020 census ===
As of the 2020 census, Anthony had 2,108 people, 922 households, and 538 families. The population density was 654.3 per square mile (252.6/km^{2}), and there were 1,217 housing units at an average density of 377.7 per square mile (145.8/km^{2}).

The median age was 41.7 years. 22.9% of residents were under the age of 18, 7.4% were from 18 to 24, 22.6% were from 25 to 44, 24.3% were from 45 to 64, and 22.8% were 65 years of age or older. For every 100 females, there were 94.8 males, and for every 100 females age 18 and over, there were 91.6 males.

Of those households, 25.9% had children under the age of 18 living in them. Of all households, 41.1% were married-couple households, 20.8% were households with a male householder and no spouse or partner present, and 30.7% were households with a female householder and no spouse or partner present. About 36.3% of all households were made up of individuals, and 17.7% had someone living alone who was 65 years of age or older.

Of the housing units, 24.2% were vacant. The homeowner vacancy rate was 5.3% and the rental vacancy rate was 20.6%. 0.0% of residents lived in urban areas, while 100.0% lived in rural areas.

Racial composition as of the 2020 census
Race	Number	Percent
White	1,903	90.3%
Black or African American	13	0.6%
American Indian and Alaska Native	44	2.1%
Asian	9	0.4%
Native Hawaiian and Other Pacific Islander	2	0.1%
Some other race	20	0.9%
Two or more races	117	5.6%
Hispanic or Latino (of any race)	110	5.2%

Demographic estimates

The average household size was 2.5 and the average family size was 3.1. The percent of those with a bachelor's degree or higher was estimated to be 11.7% of the population.

Income and poverty

The 2016–2020 5-year American Community Survey estimates show that the median household income was $51,023 (with a margin of error of +/- $7,977) and the median family income was $54,779 (+/- $12,527). Males had a median income of $36,636 (+/- $3,235) versus $23,951 (+/- $2,661) for females. The median income for those above 16 years old was $31,958 (+/- $4,258). Approximately, 12.4% of families and 15.4% of the population were below the poverty line, including 17.9% of those under the age of 18 and 15.9% of those ages 65 or over.

=== 2010 census ===
As of the census of 2010, there were 2,269 people, 977 households, and 631 families residing in the city. The population density was 724.9 inhabitants per square mile (279.9/km^{2}). There were 1,217 housing units at an average density of 388.8 per square mile (150.1/km^{2}). The racial makeup of the city was 94.0% White, 0.5% African American, 1.3% Native American, 0.2% Asian, 0.3% Pacific Islander, 1.5% from other races, and 2.2% from two or more races. Hispanic or Latino of any race were 4.0% of the population.

There were 977 households, of which 28.5% had children under the age of 18 living with them, 48.0% were married couples living together, 12.1% had a female householder with no husband present, 4.5% had a male householder with no wife present, and 35.4% were non-families. 31.7% of all households were made up of individuals, and 16.6% had someone living alone who was 65 years of age or older. The average household size was 2.26 and the average family size was 2.79.

The median age in the city was 43.1 years. 23.8% of residents were under the age of 18; 6.1% were between the ages of 18 and 24; 22% were from 25 to 44; 25.5% were from 45 to 64; and 22.5% were 65 years of age or older. The gender makeup of the city was 48.1% male and 51.9% female.

== Education ==
The community is served by Chaparral USD 361 public school district. USD 361 was created through school unification that consolidated Anthony and Harper schools.

Both Anthony and Harper have elementary schools. The district high school, Chaparral High School, is located halfway between the two towns. The Chaparral High School mascot is Roadrunners.

Anthony High School was closed through school unification. The Anthony High School mascot was Pirates.

== Notable people ==
- Dennis Moore, Congressman, 3rd District Kansas 1999–2011, born in Anthony.
- Neal Patterson, American businessman who was CEO of Cerner Corporation (medical software company)
- Virgil A. Richard, United States Army general, was born in Anthony.
- Sidney Toler (1874–1947), actor, playwright, theatre director, comic actor in Broadway theatre, portrayed detective Charlie Chan in 22 films, appeared in supporting roles in 50 films
