= Harper, Kansas =

City in Harper County, Kansas

- City
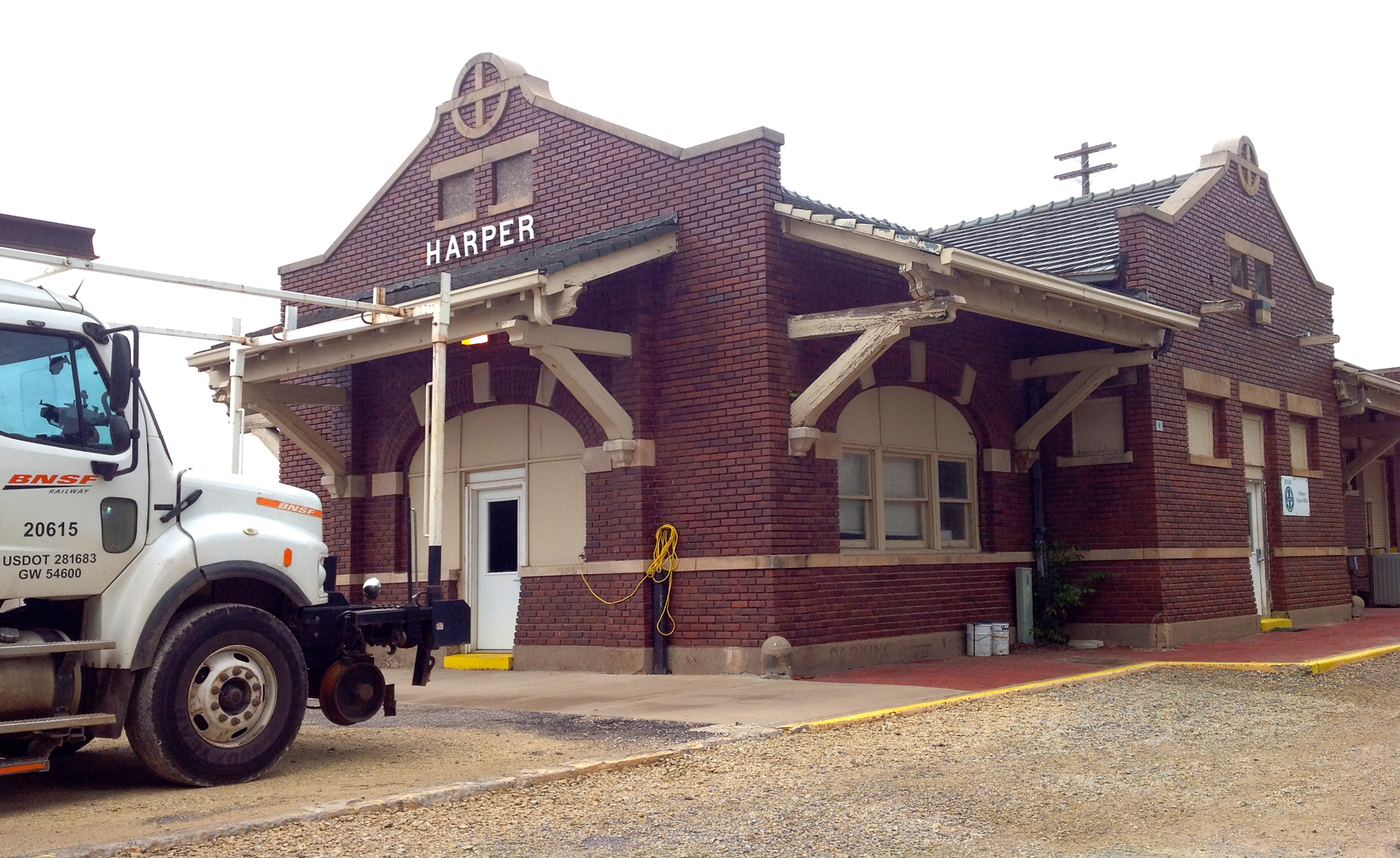
- Harper Train Depot (2015)

- Location within Harper County and Kansas

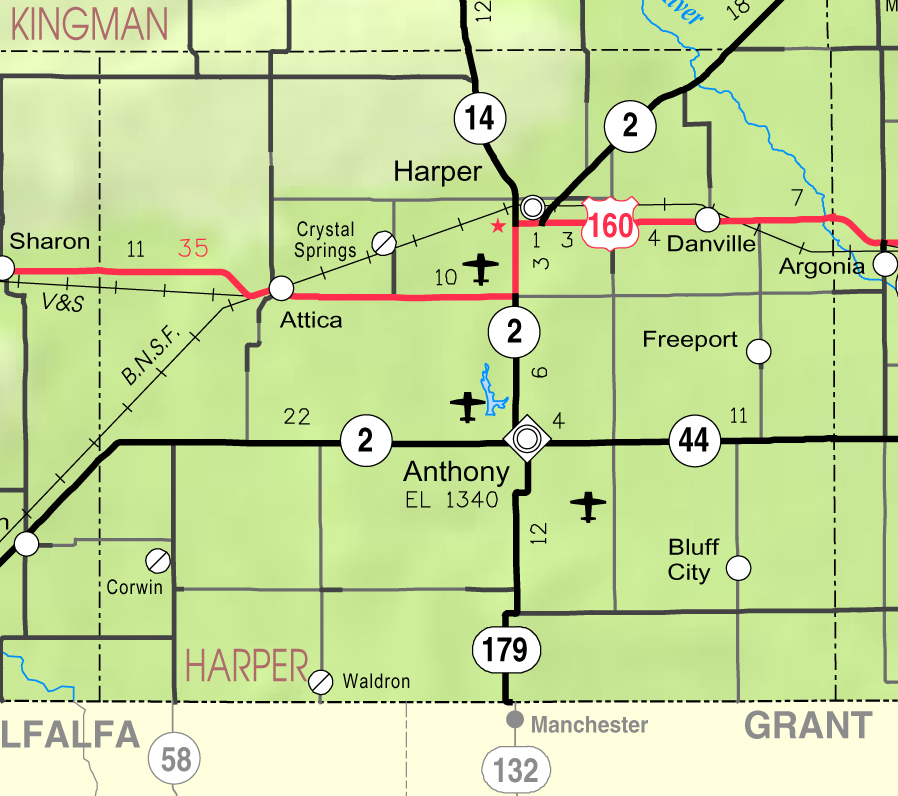
- KDOT map of Harper County (legend)
- Coordinates: 37°17′06″N 98°01′39″W
- Country: United States
- State: Kansas
- County: Harper
- Founded: 1877
- Incorporated: 1880
- Named for: Sergeant Marion Harper

Government
  - Mayor: Eric Latta

Area
  - Total: 1.62 sq mi (4.20 km^{2})
  - Land: 1.62 sq mi (4.20 km^{2})
  - Water: 0 sq mi (0.00 km^{2})
- Elevation: 1,417 ft (432 m)

Population (2020)
  - Total: 1,313
  - Density: 810/sq mi (313/km^{2})
- Time zone: UTC-6 (CST)
  - Summer (DST): UTC-5 (CDT)
- ZIP Code: 67058
- Area code: 620
- FIPS code: 20-30175
- GNIS ID: 485587
- Website: cityofharper.com

Harper is a city in Harper County, Kansas, United States. As of the 2020 census, the population of the city was 1,313.

== History ==
Harper was founded in 1877 by a colony from Iowa. The city of Harper, like Harper County, is named for Sergeant Marion Harper of the 2nd Kansas Cavalry, who fell during the Civil War. Harper was incorporated as a city in 1880.

The first post office in Harper was established in May 1877 as Cora City, but in June of that year, the post office was renamed Harper.

== Geography ==
According to the United States Census Bureau, the city has a total area of 1.63 square miles (4.22 km^{2}), all land.

== Demographics ==
Historical population
Census	Pop.	Note	%±
1890	1,579		—
1900	1,151		−27.1%
1910	1,638		42.3%
1920	1,770		8.1%
1930	1,485		−16.1%
1940	1,695		14.1%
1950	1,672		−1.4%
1960	1,899		13.6%
1970	1,665		−12.3%
1980	1,823		9.5%
1990	1,735		−4.8%
2000	1,567		−9.7%
2010	1,473		−6.0%
2020	1,313		−10.9%
U.S. Decennial Census

=== 2020 census ===
The 2020 United States census counted 1,313 people, 584 households, and 348 families in Harper. The population density was 809.0 per square mile (312.4/km^{2}). There were 741 housing units at an average density of 456.6 per square mile (176.3/km^{2}). The racial makeup was 76.77% (1,008) white or European American (73.95% non-Hispanic white), 0.23% (3) black or African-American, 2.36% (31) Native American or Alaska Native, 0.23% (3) Asian, 0.08% (1) Pacific Islander or Native Hawaiian, 12.8% (168) from other races, and 7.54% (99) from two or more races. Hispanic or Latino of any race was 19.95% (262) of the population.

Of the 584 households, 30.0% had children under the age of 18; 41.4% were married couples living together; 27.6% had a female householder with no spouse or partner present. 35.6% of households consisted of individuals and 18.2% had someone living alone who was 65 years of age or older. The average household size was 2.1 and the average family size was 2.8. The percent of those with a bachelor's degree or higher was estimated to be 7.1% of the population.

25.6% of the population was under the age of 18, 6.3% from 18 to 24, 23.7% from 25 to 44, 22.7% from 45 to 64, and 21.7% who were 65 years of age or older. The median age was 39.6 years. For every 100 females, there were 98.0 males. For every 100 females ages 18 and older, there were 96.6 males.

The 2016–2020 5-year American Community Survey estimates show that the median household income was $51,750 (with a margin of error of +/- $2,828) and the median family income was $75,917 (+/- $18,670). Males had a median income of $39,564 (+/- $6,208) versus $21,458 (+/- $1,773) for females. The median income for those above 16 years old was $33,750 (+/- $7,955). Approximately, 4.4% of families and 11.4% of the population were below the poverty line, including 11.7% of those under the age of 18 and 12.0% of those ages 65 or over.

=== 2010 census ===
As of the census of 2010, there were 1,473 people, 624 households, and 385 families living in the city. The population density was 903.7 inhabitants per square mile (348.9/km^{2}). There were 742 housing units at an average density of 455.2 per square mile (175.8/km^{2}). The racial makeup of the city was 92.2% White, 0.2% African American, 1.3% Native American, 0.1% Asian, 0.5% Pacific Islander, 4.8% from other races, and 1.0% from two or more races. Hispanic or Latino of any race were 10.0% of the population.

There were 624 households, of which 30.9% had children under the age of 18 living with them, 47.0% were married couples living together, 8.7% had a female householder with no husband present, 6.1% had a male householder with no wife present, and 38.3% were non-families. 34.5% of all households were made up of individuals, and 15.4% had someone living alone who was 65 years of age or older. The average household size was 2.33 and the average family size was 2.95.

The median age in the city was 40.3 years. 25.1% of residents were under the age of 18; 8% were between the ages of 18 and 24; 22.8% were from 25 to 44; 25.1% were from 45 to 64; and 19.1% were 65 years of age or older. The gender makeup of the city was 50.2% male and 49.8% female.

== Education ==
The community is served by Chaparral USD 361 public school district. USD 361 was created through school unification that consolidated Anthony and Harper schools.

Both Anthony and Harper have elementary schools. The district high school, Chaparral High School, is located halfway between the two towns. The Chaparral High School mascot is Roadrunners.

Harper High School was closed through school unification. The Harper High School mascot was Bearcats.
