= National Register of Historic Places listings in Rice County, Kansas =

Location of Rice County in Kansas

This is a list of the National Register of Historic Places listings in Rice County, Kansas.

This is intended to be a complete list of the properties and districts on the National Register of Historic Places in Rice County, Kansas, United States. The locations of National Register properties and districts for which the latitude and longitude coordinates are included below may be seen on a map. There are 15 properties and districts listed on the National Register in the county, including 1 National Historic Landmark and two former listings.

This National Park Service list is complete through NPS recent listings posted November 13, 2026.

== Current listings ==
	Name on the Register	Image	Date listed	Location	City or town	Description
1	Archeological Site Number 14RC10		July 9, 1982 (#82004887)	9 miles (14 km) northeast of Lyons	Little River	A petroglyph site located near the Tobias-Thompson Complex and perhaps related to it
2	Archeological Site Number 14RC11		July 9, 1982 (#82004866)	Address restricted	Little River	
3	Cooper Hall	Cooper Hall	May 3, 1974 (#74000845)	N. Broadway Ave. 38°13′18″N 98°12′27″W	Sterling	
4	Little Arkansas River Crossing		April 5, 2014 (#14000122)	Northeast of the junction of Ave. P and 30th Rd. 38°18′15″N 97°56′36″W	Windom	Santa Fe Trail Multiple Property Submission
5	Malone Archeological Site		June 26, 1972 (#72000523)	Eastern side of Cow Creek, west of Lyons; 38°21′00″N 98°17′24″W	Lyons	
6	Rice County Courthouse	Rice County Courthouse	April 26, 2002 (#02000401)	101 W. Commercial St. 38°20′50″N 98°12′13″W	Lyons	
7	Rice County Jail and Sheriff's Residence	Rice County Jail and Sheriff's Residence	September 30, 2021 (#100007026)	120 East Main St. 38°20′52″N 98°12′11″W	Lyons	
8	Santa Fe Trail-Rice County Trail Segments		May 11, 1995 (#95000582)	Bushton Blacktop (FAS Highway 570), ¾ mile north of U.S. Route 56; also 4th Rd. at Av. L, ¾ mile north of U.S. Route 56; 38°21′34″N 98°25′20″W	Chase	4th and L represents a boundary increase of July 17, 2013
9	Santa Fe Trail-Rice County Segment 2		August 6, 2013 (#13000580)	Ave. P, ¾ mile west of 30th Rd. 38°18′15″N 97°57′26″W	Little River	Santa Fe Trail Multiple Property Submission
10	Santa Fe Trail-Rice County Segment 3		August 6, 2013 (#13000581)	Address Restricted	Windom	Santa Fe Trail Multiple Property Submission
11	Saxman Site		May 3, 1976 (#76000837)	0.5 miles (0.80 km) south of Saxman on Cow Creek; 38°16′26″N 98°07′26″W	Saxman	
12	Shay Building	Shay Building	April 12, 2010 (#10000179)	202 S. Broadway Ave. 38°12′31″N 98°12′24″W	Sterling	
13	Station Little Arkansas		May 11, 1995 (#95000583)	5 miles south of U.S. Route 56 on FAS Highway 443, ¾ miles west on gravel road 38°18′10″N 97°56′11″W	Windom	
14	Sterling Free Public Carnegie Library	Sterling Free Public Carnegie Library	June 25, 1987 (#87000969)	132 N. Broadway; 38°12′38″N 98°12′25″W	Sterling	Red brick Carnegie library built in 1916, funded by a $10,000 grant
15	Tobias-Thompson Complex	Tobias-Thompson Complex	October 15, 1966 (#66000349)	4 miles southeast of Geneseo; 38°27′24″N 98°05′31″W	Geneseo	

== Former listings ==
	Name on the Register	Image	Date listed	Date removed	Location	City or town	Description
1	Charles K. Beckett House		January 16, 2009 (#08001350)	January 17, 2017	210 W. Main; 38°12′36″N 98°12′31″W	Sterling	
2	Lyons High School		June 9, 2005 (#05000556)	September 14, 2018	401 S. Douglas Ave. 38°20′47″N 98°12′27″W	Lyons	

== See also ==
- List of National Historic Landmarks in Kansas
- National Register of Historic Places listings in Kansas
