= Santa Fe Trail-Rice County Trail Segments =

- U.S. National Register of Historic Places
- Location within Kansas Location within the United States
- Location: Bushton Blacktop (FAS Highway 570), ¾ mile north of U.S. Route 56; Boundary increase (listed July 17, 2013, refnum 13000495): 4th Rd at Ave L, 3/4 mi. no. of US 56
- Nearest city: Chase, Kansas
- Coordinates: 38.359444°N 98.422222°W
- Area: 16 acres (6.5 ha) (original); 43.68 acres (17.68 ha) (revised)
- MPS: Santa Fe Trail MPS
- NRHP reference No.: 95000582
- Added to NRHP: May 11, 1995

Santa Fe Trail-Rice County Trail Segments are historic sites in Rice County, Kansas which preserve segments of the historic Santa Fe Trail.

An approximately 16 acres (6.5 ha) area including six of these sites, near Chase, known also as Ralph's Ruts, was listed on the National Register of Historic Places in 1995.

That area was expanded, adding two more sites, known as Kerns' Ruts, in 2013. These are all west of Chase. This added about 24 acres, reaching a new combined listed area of 43.68 acres (17.68 ha).

Another location near Little River, Kansas, Santa Fe Trail-Rice County Segment 2, with reference number 13000580, was listed on the National Register on August 6, 2013. This added 35.45 acres (14.35 ha) and is located off Ave. P., .75 miles (1.21 km) west of 30th Rd. This is known also ast Fry Ruts and is located at 38°18′15″N 97°57′26″W.

Less public information is available about another site listed on August 6, 2013, as Santa Fe Trail-Rice County Segment 3, with reference number 13000581, in the vicinity of Windom, Kansas. It is address restricted.
