= Pollard, Kansas =

Unincorporated community in Rice County, Kansas

- Unincorporated community
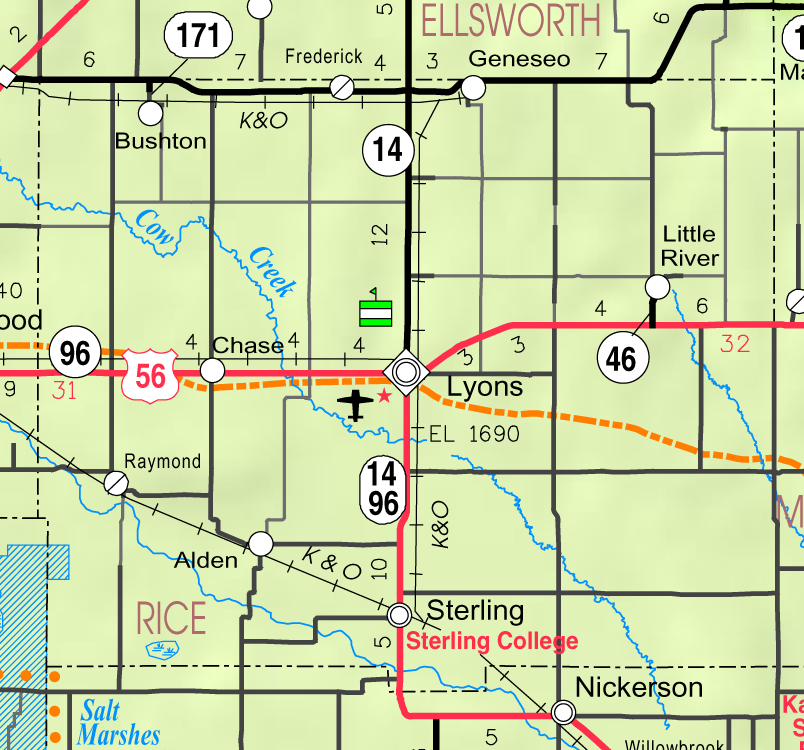
- KDOT map of Rice County (legend)

- Location within Kansas Location within the United States
- Coordinates: 38°26′59″N 98°12′38″W
- Country: United States
- State: Kansas
- County: Rice
- Township: Victoria
- Elevation: 1,736 ft (529 m)
- Time zone: UTC-6 (CST)
  - Summer (DST): UTC-5 (CDT)
- Area code: 620
- FIPS code: 20-56975
- GNIS ID: 484741

Pollard is an unincorporated community in Victoria Township, Rice County, Kansas, United States. It lies a fraction of a mile (about 1 km) west of K-14, 6 miles (9.7 km) southwest of Geneseo and 7 miles (11 km) north of Lyons.

== History ==
For millennia, the land now known as Kansas was inhabited by Native Americans. In 1803, most of modern Kansas was secured by the United States as part of the Louisiana Purchase. In 1854, the Kansas Territory was organized, then in 1861 Kansas became the 34th U.S. state. In 1867, Rice County was founded.

Pollard had a post office from 1888 until 1923.

== Education ==
The community is served by Lyons USD 405 public school district.
