= Tobias-Thompson Complex =

- U.S. National Register of Historic Places
- U.S. National Historic Landmark District
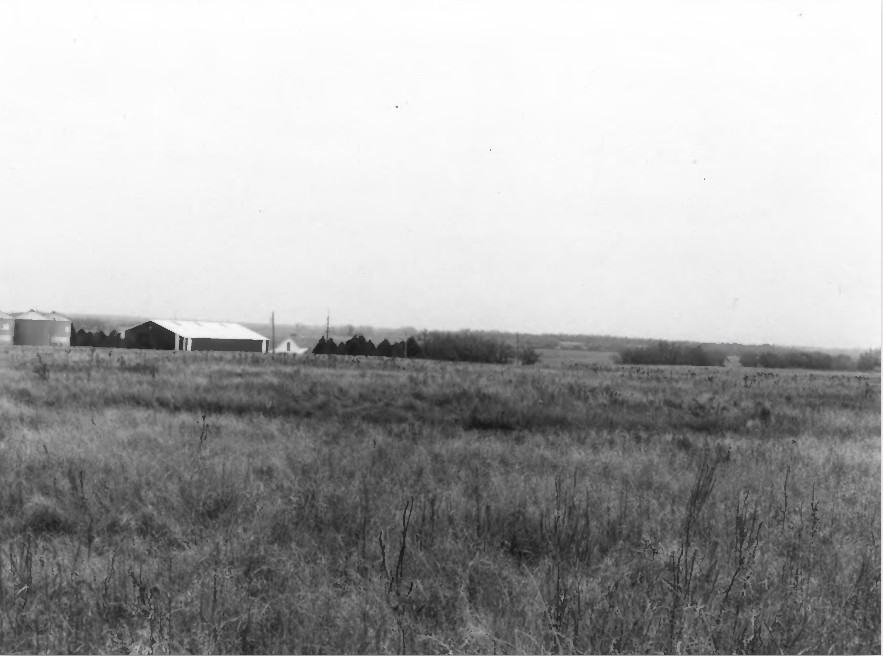
- 1975 Park Service photo of the Tobias site council circle
- Nearest city: Geneseo, Kansas
- NRHP reference No.: 66000349

Significant dates
- Added to NRHP: October 15, 1966
- Designated NHLD: July 4, 1964

The Tobias-Thompson Complex, also known as the Little River Archeological District, is a complex of archaeological sites on the banks of the Little Arkansas River near Geneseo, Kansas, United States. The complex is an important set of sites that is one of the few in the region bridging the periods of prehistory and European contact, with a period of significance between 1500 and 1700 CE. It was designated a National Historic Landmark in 1964 and listed on the National Register of Historic Places in 1966.

== Description ==
The Tobias-Thompson Complex consists of eight archaeological sites, located on both sides of the Little Arkansas River. They are believed to represent portions of a single large settlement area, subdivided into separate villages. Given the complex's location, it is possible that this was a village site visited by Spanish explorer Francisco Vázquez de Coronado during his 1541 expedition to a place he called Quivira. Typical features of these sites include the presence of a council circle, depressions consistent with known forms of period semi-subterranean living structures, and mounds representing food caches or refuse middens. Some of the sites have lost surface-level artifacts due to cultivation, while others have never been cultivated and are covered by a layer of native sod. Some of the sites have long been known as sources of artifacts, and have been subjected to looting. Despite this, the size and scope of the sites is such that there is a great deal of potential information to be recovered by further investigation.

The Tobias site was excavated three times by archaeologist Waldo Wedel for the Smithsonian Institution, in 1940, 1965, and 1971. The 1965 excavation was particularly significant, because it uncovered evidence of a deeper habitation layer beneath that site's council circle. Finds from these investigations include pottery fragments, stone and bone tools and projectile points, and human remains.

== See also ==
- List of National Historic Landmarks in Kansas
- National Register of Historic Places listings in Rice County, Kansas
