= Conway, Kansas =

Unincorporated community in McPherson County, Kansas

- Unincorporated community
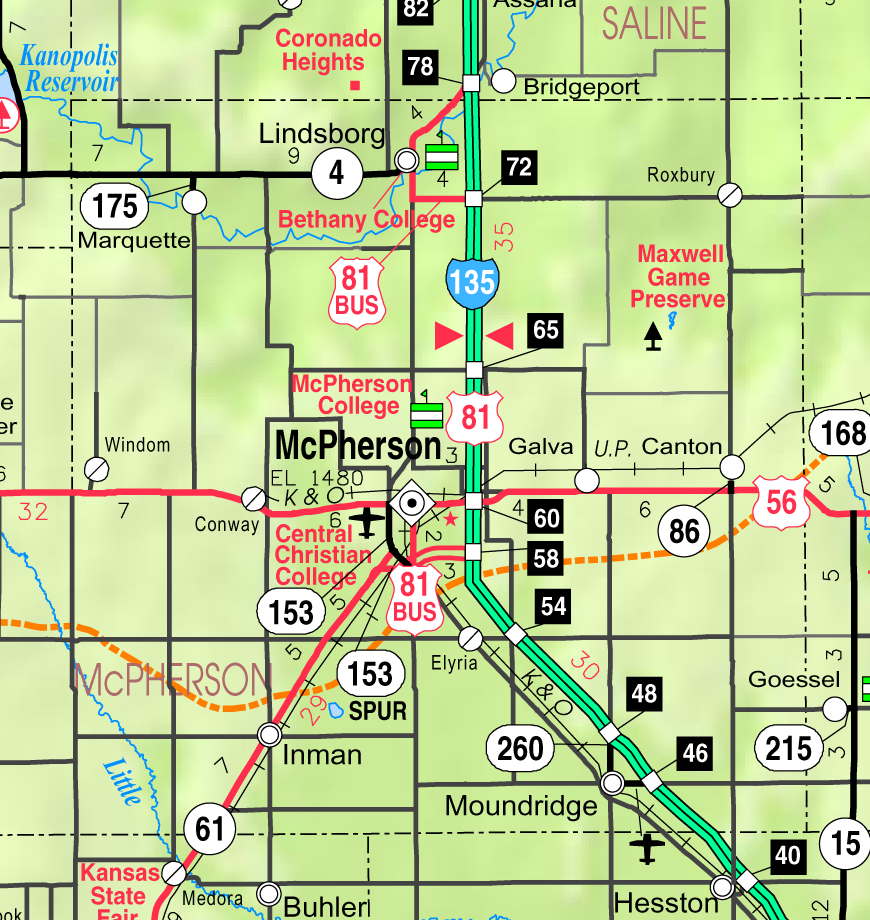
- KDOT map of McPherson County (legend)

- Location within Kansas Location within the United States
- Coordinates: 38°22′10″N 97°47′11″W
- Country: United States
- State: Kansas
- County: McPherson
- Elevation: 1,542 ft (470 m)
- Time zone: UTC-6 (CST)
  - Summer (DST): UTC-5 (CDT)
- Area code: 620
- FIPS code: 20-15275
- GNIS feature ID: 484354

Conway is an unincorporated community in southwestern Jackson Township, McPherson County, Kansas, United States. It lies along U.S. Route 56 and a Kansas and Oklahoma Railroad line, west of the city of McPherson.

== History ==
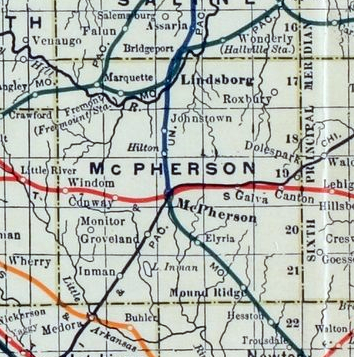
1915 railroad map of McPherson County.

=== 19th century ===
For millennia, the land now known as Kansas was inhabited by Native Americans. In 1803, most of modern Kansas was secured by the United States as part of the Louisiana Purchase. In 1854, the Kansas Territory was organized, then in 1861 Kansas became the 34th U.S. state. In 1867, McPherson County was founded.

In 1878, Atchison, Topeka and Santa Fe Railway and parties from Marion County and McPherson County chartered the Marion and McPherson Railway Company. In 1879, a branch line was built from Florence to McPherson; in 1880 it was extended to Lyons and in 1881 was extended to Ellinwood. The line was leased and operated by the Atchison, Topeka and Santa Fe Railway. The line from Florence to Marion, was abandoned in 1968. In 1992, the line from Marion to McPherson was sold to Central Kansas Railway. In 1993, after heavy flood damage, the line from Marion to McPherson was abandoned. The original branch line connected Florence, Marion, Canada, Hillsboro, Lehigh, Canton, Galva, McPherson, Conway, Windom, Little River, Mitchell, Lyons, Chase, and Ellinwood.

A post office was opened in Conway in 1880, and remained in operation until it was discontinued in 1983.

=== 20th century ===
The National Old Trails Road, also known as the Ocean-to-Ocean Highway, was established in 1912, and was routed through Windom, Conway, and McPherson.

== Economy ==
Conway is home to a large underground refined petroleum storage facility. The storage facility consists of large caverns carved into the underlying salt beds. The storage facility has a holding capacity of over 4 million barrels of propane and other refined petroleum products. The Conway storage facility holds approximately 30% of the propane stored in the United States.

== Education ==
The community is served by McPherson USD 418 public school district.
