= Lehigh, Kansas =

City in Marion County, Kansas

- City
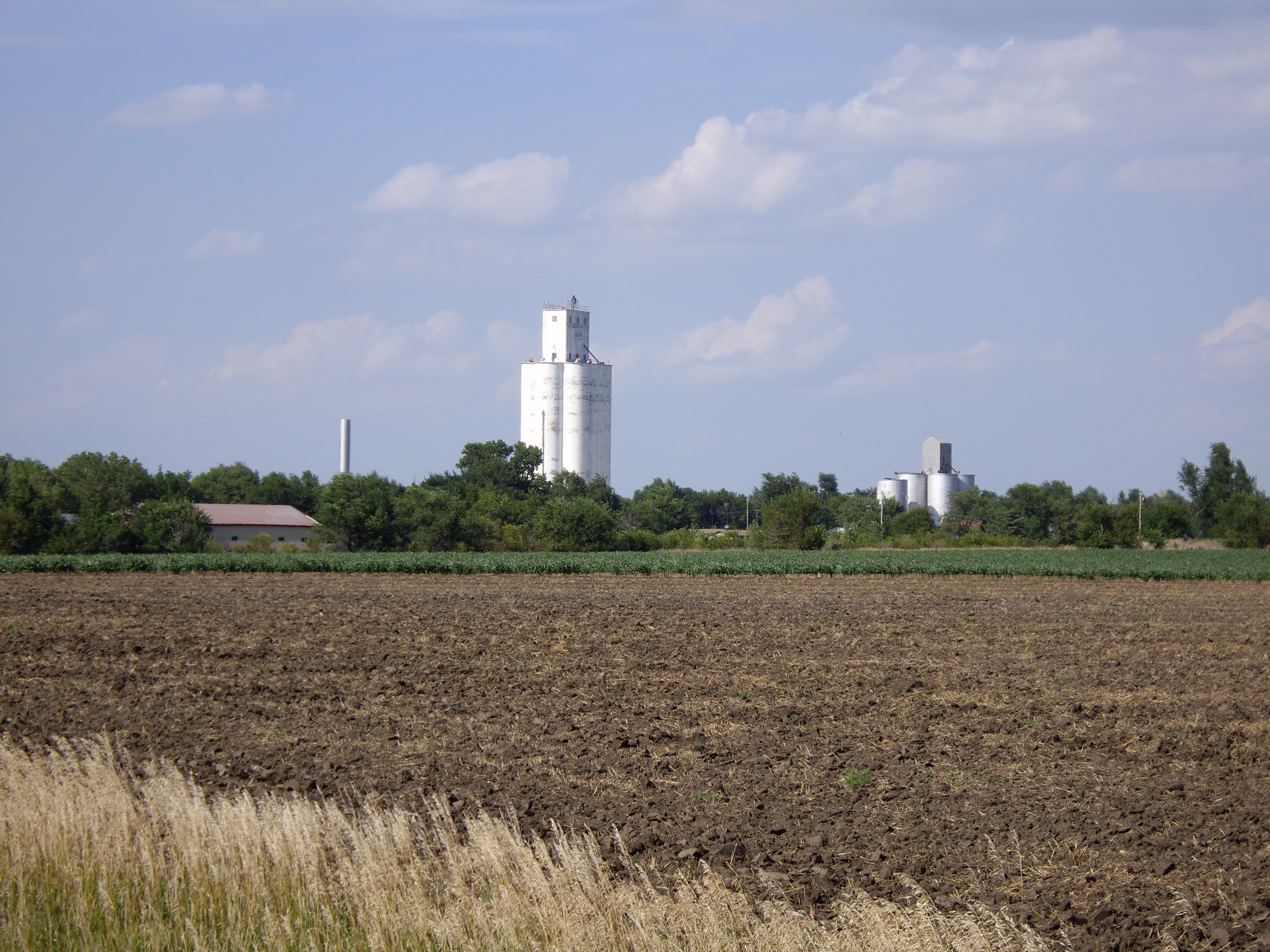
- Skyline of Lehigh (2010)

- Location within Marion County and Kansas

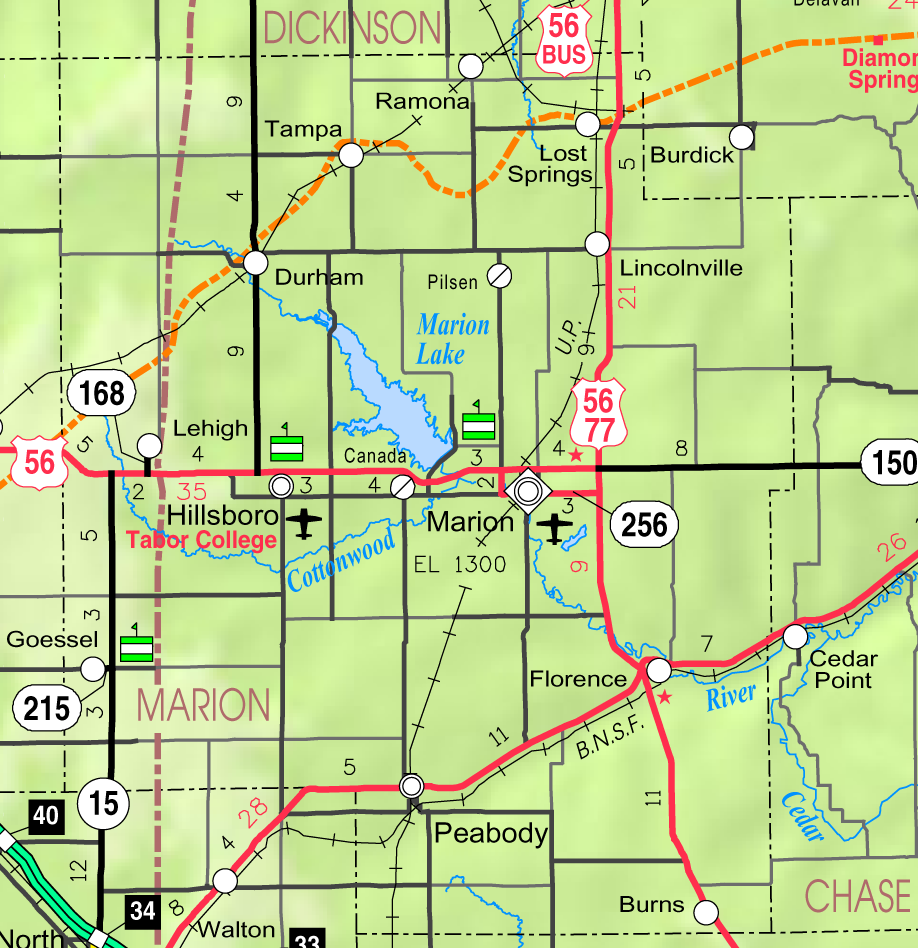
- KDOT map of Marion County (legend)
- Coordinates: 38°22′23″N 97°18′09″W
- Country: United States
- State: Kansas
- County: Marion
- Township: Lehigh
- Platted: 1881
- Incorporated: 1901

Government
  - Type: Mayor–Council
  - Mayor: Scott Schultz

Area
  - Total: 0.32 sq mi (0.83 km^{2})
  - Land: 0.32 sq mi (0.83 km^{2})
  - Water: 0 sq mi (0.00 km^{2})
- Elevation: 1,532 ft (467 m)

Population (2020)
  - Total: 161
  - Density: 500/sq mi (190/km^{2})
- Time zone: UTC-6 (CST)
  - Summer (DST): UTC-5 (CDT)
- ZIP Code: 67073
- Area code: 620
- FIPS code: 20-39225
- GNIS ID: 2395672
- Website: City website

Lehigh is a city in Marion County, Kansas, United States. As of the 2020 census, the population of the city was 161. It is located between Hillsboro and Canton on the north side of U.S. Route 56.

== History ==
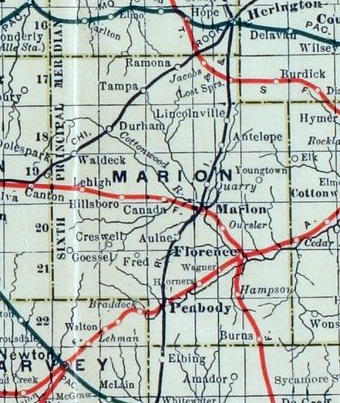
1915 railroad map of Marion County

=== Early history ===
For many millennia, the Great Plains of North America was inhabited by nomadic Native Americans. From the 16th century to 18th century, the Kingdom of France claimed ownership of large parts of North America. In 1762, after the French and Indian War, France secretly ceded New France to Spain, per the Treaty of Fontainebleau.

=== 19th century ===
In 1802, Spain returned most of the land to France. In 1803, most of the land for modern day Kansas was acquired by the United States from France as part of the 828,000 square mile Louisiana Purchase for 2.83 cents per acre.

In 1854, the Kansas Territory was organized, then in 1861 Kansas became the 34th U.S. state. In 1855, Marion County was established within the Kansas Territory, which included the land for modern day Lehigh.

The source of the Lehigh name was not well documented. One of the rumors is the city being slightly higher altitude which was "lay high" above the prairie, the other rumor that it was named by representatives of Lehigh County, Pennsylvania who came to Kansas and considered settling the area in the 1870s or 1880s.

Four and one-half miles north of Lehigh is the junction of the old Santa Fe Trail and Chisolm Trail, which is near the site of the municipal water well for the city. The Santa Fe Trail was active across Marion County from 1821 to 1866, and the Chisholm Trail was active from 1867 to 1871.

As early as 1875, city leaders of Marion held a meeting to consider a branch railroad from Florence. In 1878, Atchison, Topeka and Santa Fe Railway and parties from Marion and McPherson counties chartered the Marion and McPherson Railway Company. In 1879, a branch line was built from Florence to McPherson, in 1880 it was extended to Lyons, in 1881 it was extended to Ellinwood. The line was leased and operated by the Atchison, Topeka and Santa Fe Railway. The line from Florence to Marion was abandoned in 1968. In 1992, the line from Marion to McPherson was sold to Central Kansas Railway. In 1993, after heavy flood damage, the line from Marion through Lehigh to McPherson was abandoned and removed. The original branch line connected Florence, Marion, Canada, Hillsboro, Lehigh, Canton, Galva, McPherson, Conway, Windom, Little River, Mitchell, Lyons, Chase and Ellinwood. The former 1879 Lehigh rail depot was moved to Walton and sits next to Highway 50.

A post office was established at Lehigh on April 23, 1880.

Lehigh was platted in 1881.

=== 20th century ===
Lehigh was incorporated in 1901 and at the time of the 1910 census had a population of 385. At one time it boasted a bank, several mercantile businesses, and a German weekly Mennonite newspaper, Das Echo, started in 1897.

The National Old Trails Road, also known as the Ocean-to-Ocean Highway, was established in 1912, and was routed through Lehigh, Hillsboro, Marion, Lost Springs.

== Geography ==
Lehigh is in the scenic Flint Hills and Great Plains of the state of Kansas. According to the United States Census Bureau, the city has a total area of 0.30 square miles (0.78 km^{2}), all land. The county line is 3.5 miles west of Lehigh. The North and South Cottonwood River start a few miles northwest of Lehigh.

== Area Events ==
- Lehigh Antique Tractor & Engine Show, every Memorial Day.

== Area attractions ==
- Santa Fe Trail
  - Santa Fe Trail / Chisholm Trail Marker, approximately 3.5 miles west and next to U.S. Route 56 highway.
  - Santa Fe Trail Markers, numerous markers in the area.
  - Santa Fe Trail Self-Guided Auto Tour.
- Marion Reservoir, approximately 10 miles east of Lehigh.

== Demographics ==
Historical population
Census	Pop.	Note	%±
1910	385		—
1920	570		48.1%
1930	315		−44.7%
1940	296		−6.0%
1950	240		−18.9%
1960	178		−25.8%
1970	168		−5.6%
1980	189		12.5%
1990	180		−4.8%
2000	215		19.4%
2010	175		−18.6%
2020	161		−8.0%
U.S. Decennial Census

=== 2020 census ===
The 2020 United States census counted 161 people, 64 households, and 43 families in Lehigh. The population density was 500.0 per square mile (193.1/km^{2}). There were 72 housing units at an average density of 223.6 per square mile (86.3/km^{2}). The racial makeup was 90.68% (146) white or European American (90.68% non-Hispanic white), 0.62% (1) black or African-American, 1.24% (2) Native American or Alaska Native, 1.86% (3) Asian, 0.0% (0) Pacific Islander or Native Hawaiian, 0.62% (1) from other races, and 4.97% (8) from two or more races. Hispanic or Latino of any race was 4.35% (7) of the population.

Of the 64 households, 29.7% had children under the age of 18; 54.7% were married couples living together; 18.8% had a female householder with no spouse or partner present. 32.8% of households consisted of individuals and 18.8% had someone living alone who was 65 years of age or older. The average household size was 2.6 and the average family size was 3.0. The percent of those with a bachelor's degree or higher was estimated to be 21.7% of the population.

21.1% of the population was under the age of 18, 8.7% from 18 to 24, 30.4% from 25 to 44, 23.0% from 45 to 64, and 16.8% who were 65 years of age or older. The median age was 37.8 years. For every 100 females, there were 96.3 males. For every 100 females ages 18 and older, there were 95.4 males.

The 2016–2020 5-year American Community Survey estimates show that the median household income was $63,333 (with a margin of error of +/- $25,820) and the median family income was $70,625 (+/- $16,166). Males had a median income of $34,375 (+/- $12,285) versus $36,500 (+/- $7,136) for females. The median income for those above 16 years old was $35,750 (+/- $7,474). Approximately, 0.0% of families and 3.9% of the population were below the poverty line, including 4.0% of those under the age of 18 and 12.1% of those ages 65 or over.

=== 2010 census ===
As of the census of 2010, there were 175 people, 70 households, and 49 families residing in the city. The population density was 583.3 inhabitants per square mile (225.2/km^{2}). There were 84 housing units at an average density of 280.0 per square mile (108.1/km^{2}). The racial makeup of the city was 96.6% White, 2.9% from other races, and 0.6% from two or more races. Hispanic or Latino of any race were 4.0% of the population.

There were 70 households, of which 32.9% had children under the age of 18 living with them, 54.3% were married couples living together, 7.1% had a female householder with no husband present, 8.6% had a male householder with no wife present, and 30.0% were non-families. 27.1% of all households were made up of individuals, and 12.9% had someone living alone who was 65 years of age or older. The average household size was 2.50 and the average family size was 3.02.

The median age in the city was 32.8 years. 29.7% of residents were under the age of 18; 8.7% were between the ages of 18 and 24; 24.6% were from 25 to 44; 23.4% were from 45 to 64; and 13.7% were 65 years of age or older. The gender makeup of the city was 50.9% male and 49.1% female.

== Government ==
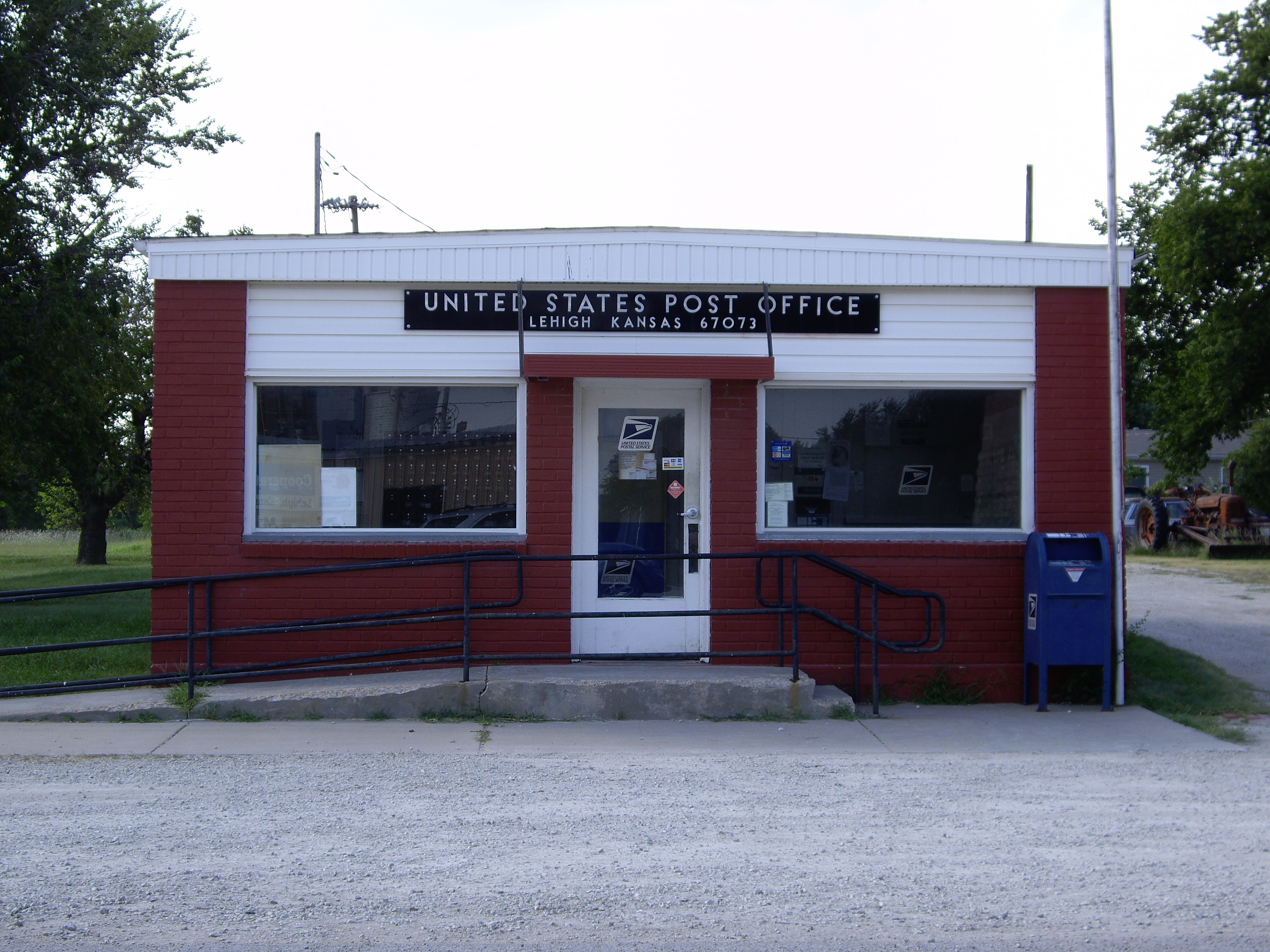
Lehigh US Post Office (2010)

Lehigh has a government consisting of a Mayor and five-member city council. The council meets the second Monday of each month at 7:30PM.

- City Hall, 110 E Main St.
- U.S. Post Office, 112 W Main St.

== Education ==
The community is served by Hillsboro USD 410 public school district. The Hillsboro High School is a member of T.E.E.N., a shared video teaching network between five area high schools. All students attend schools in Hillsboro.

Lehigh Rural High School was closed after the spring graduation in 1966. The Lehigh High School mascot was Lehigh Eagles.

== Media ==
=== Print ===
- Hillsboro Star-Journal, local newspaper from Hillsboro.
- Hillsboro Free Press, free newspaper for greater Marion County area.

=== Radio ===
Lehigh is served by numerous radio stations of the Wichita-Hutchinson listening market area, and satellite radio. See Media in Wichita, Kansas.

=== Television ===
Lehigh is served by over-the-air ATSC digital TV of the Wichita-Hutchinson viewing market area, cable TV, and satellite TV. See Media in Wichita, Kansas.

== Infrastructure ==
=== Transportation ===
U.S. Route 56 highway is 0.5 miles (0.80 km) south of the city.

=== Utilities ===
- Internet
  - Satellite is provided by HughesNet, StarBand, WildBlue.
- TV
  - Satellite is provided by DirecTV, Dish Network.
  - Terrestrial is provided by regional digital TV stations.
- Electricity
  - Rural is provided by Flint Hills RECA.
- Water
  - City is provided by City of Lehigh.
  - Rural is provided by Marion County RWD #4 (map).

== Gallery ==
- Historic Images of Lehigh, Special Photo Collections at Wichita State University Library.
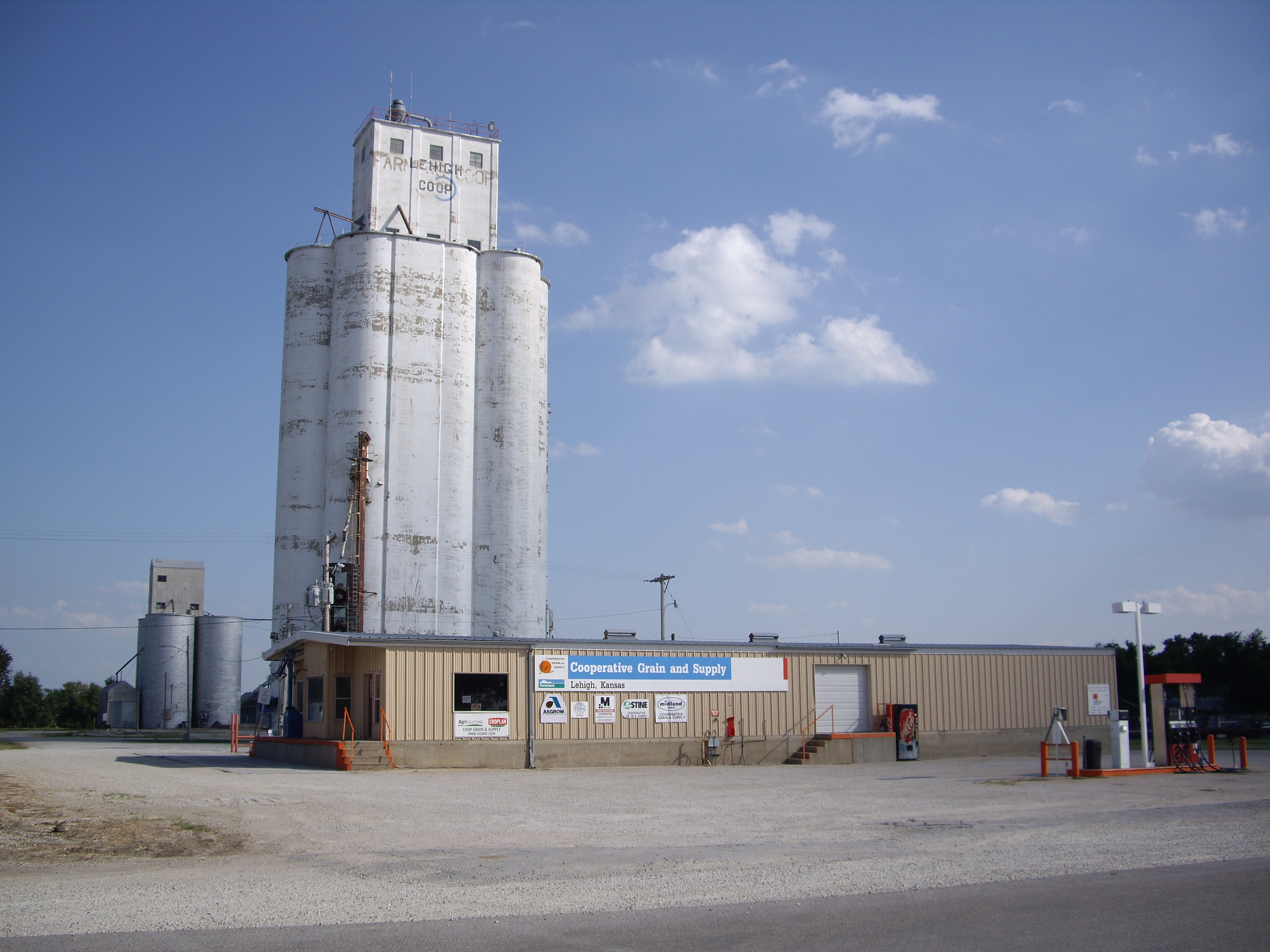
Cooperative Grain and Supply (2010)

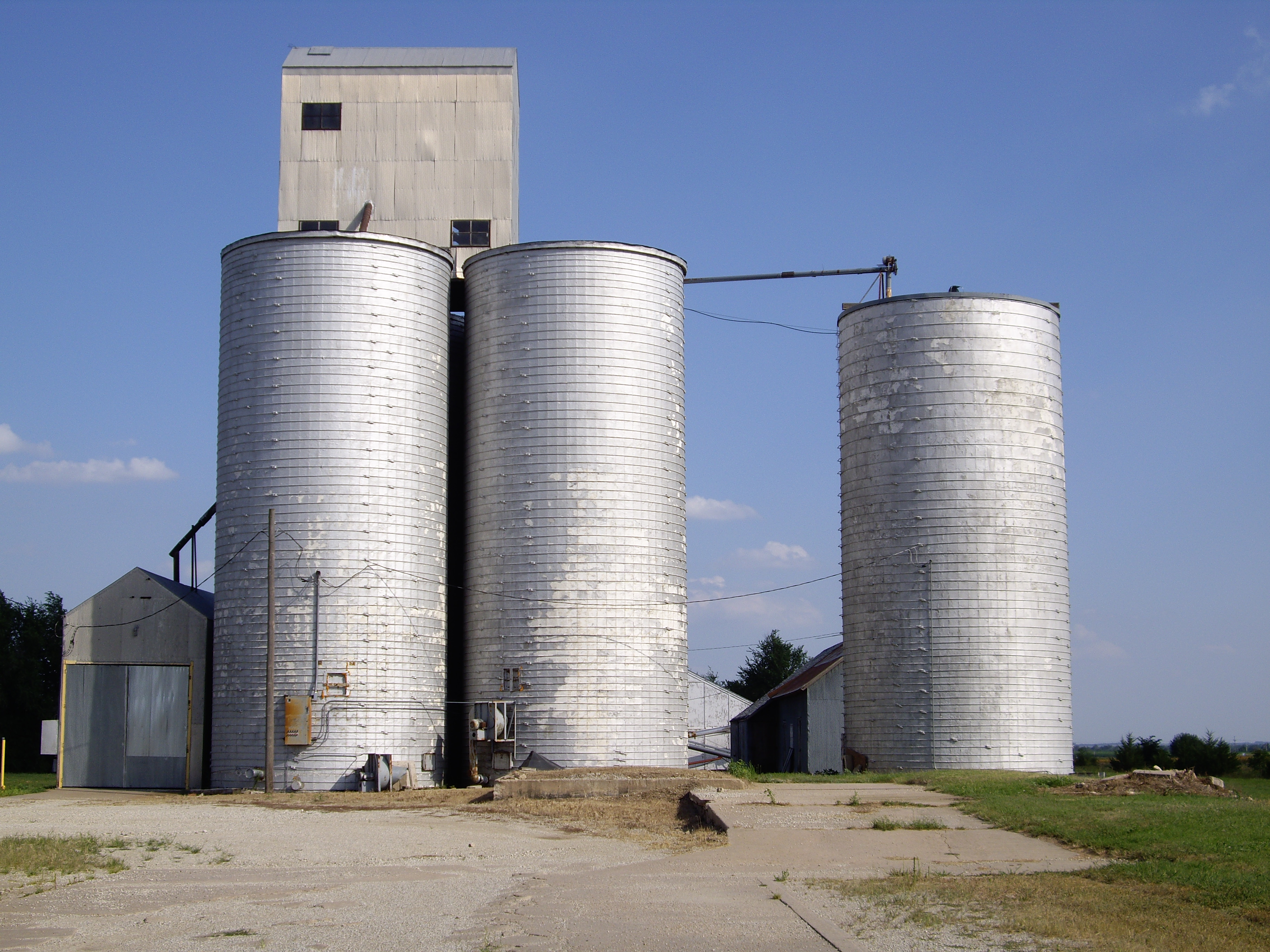
Old grain elevator (2010)

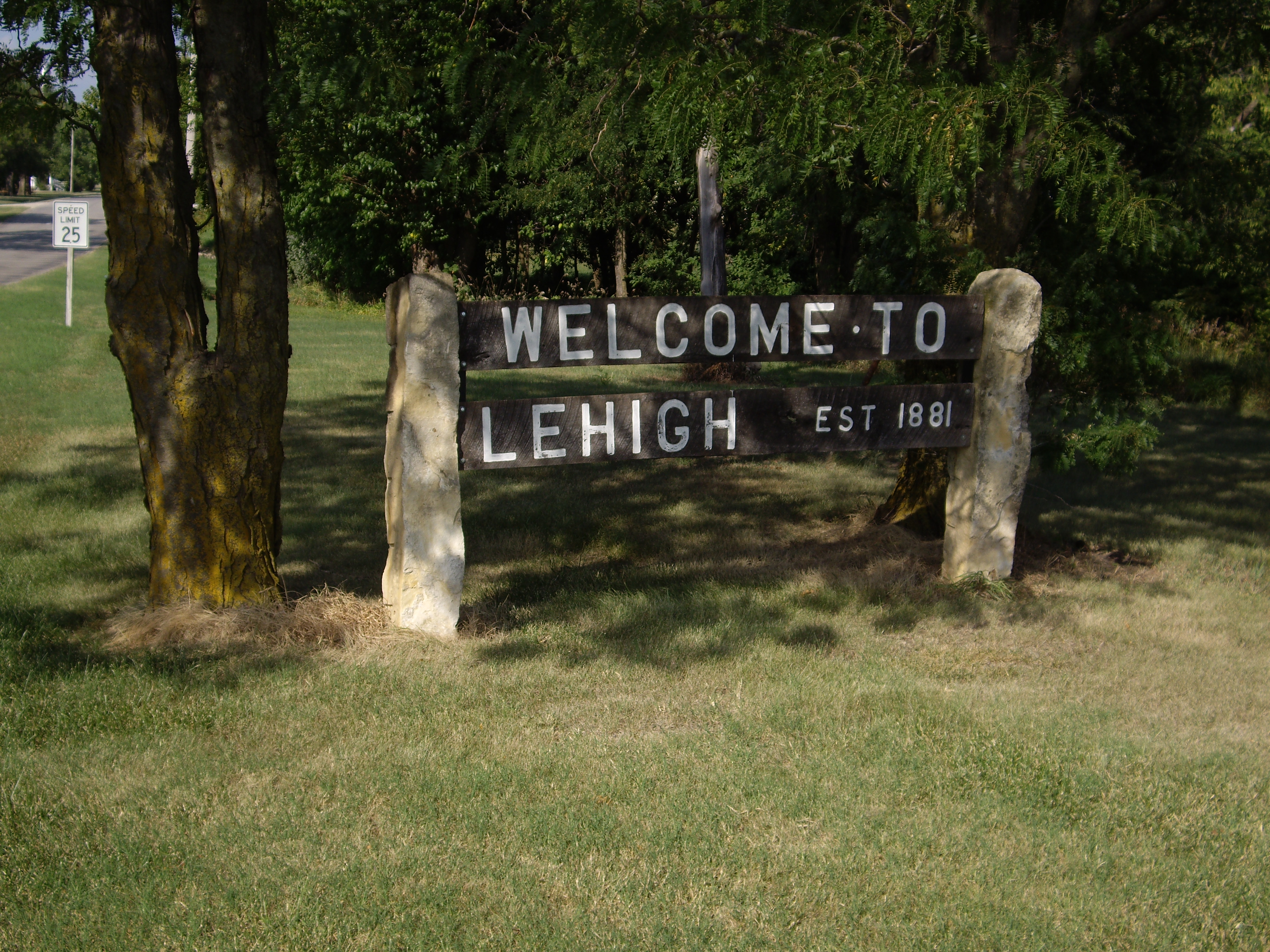
Greeting Sign at corner of Main St and State Highway 168 (2010)

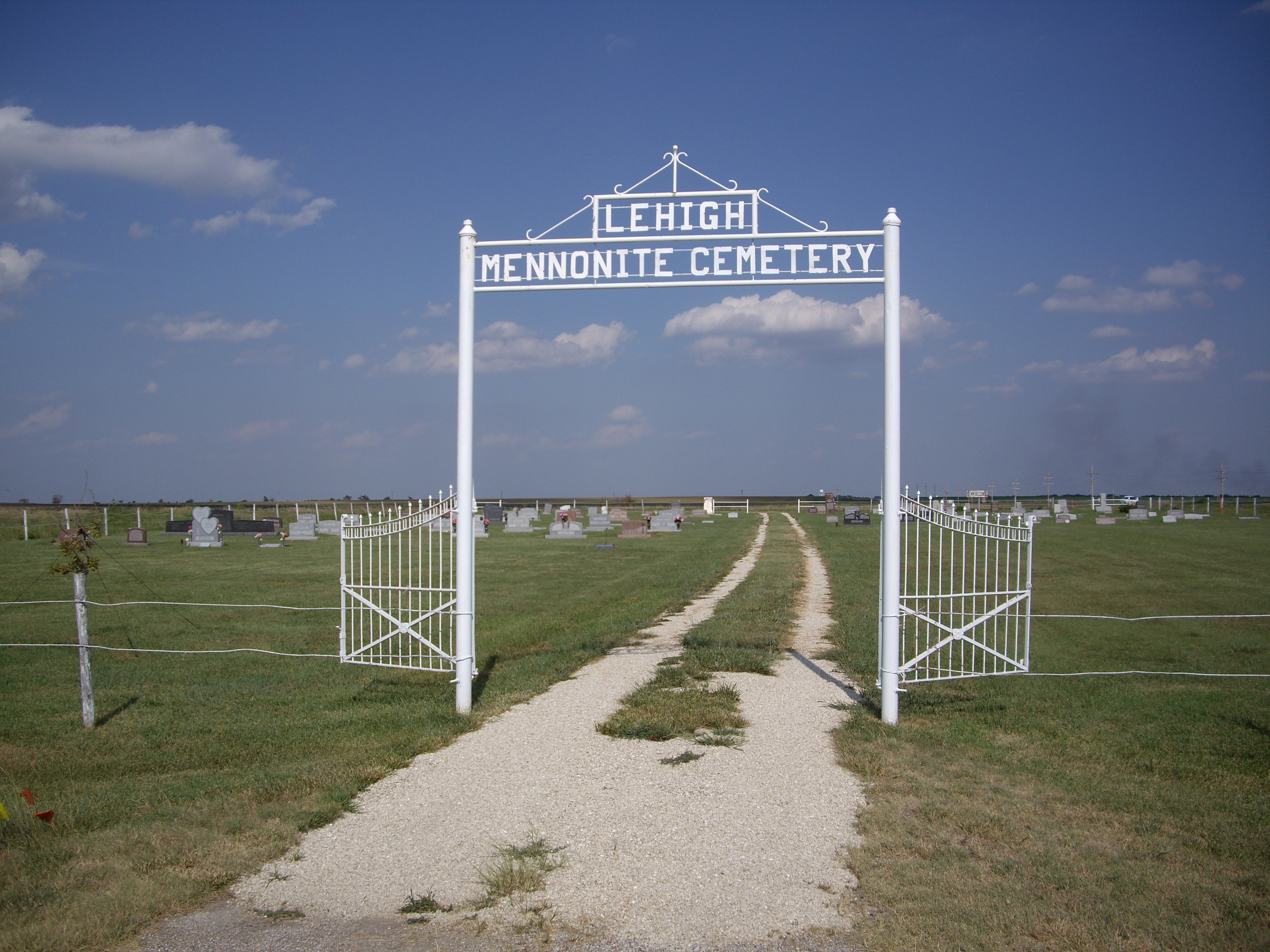
Lehigh Mennonite Cemetery, 1/2 mile south of Lehigh (2010)

== See also ==
- National Register of Historic Places listings in Marion County, Kansas
- Historical Maps of Marion County, Kansas
- Chisholm Trail
- Santa Fe Trail
- National Old Trails Road
