= Mitchell, Kansas =

Unincorporated community in Rice County, Kansas

- Unincorporated community
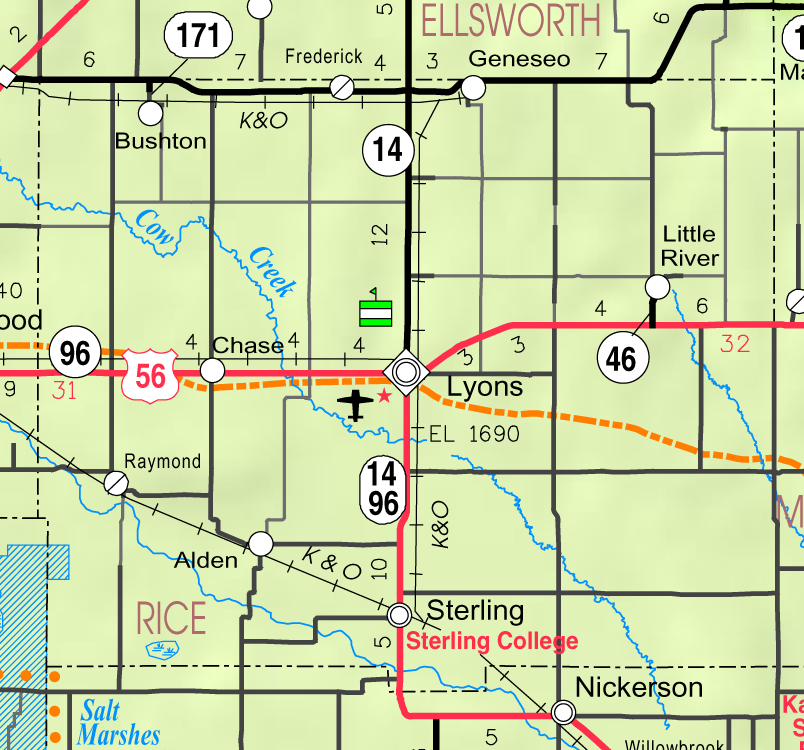
- KDOT map of Rice County (legend)

- Location within Kansas Location within the United States
- Coordinates: 38°23′2″N 98°05′59″W
- Country: United States
- State: Kansas
- County: Rice
- Township: Mitchell
- Elevation: 1,739 ft (530 m)
- Time zone: UTC-6 (CST)
  - Summer (DST): UTC-5 (CDT)
- Area code: 620
- FIPS code: 20-47500
- GNIS ID: 475681

Mitchell is an unincorporated community in Rice County, Kansas, United States. Located about 6 miles (9.7 km) east-northeast of the city of Lyons, it lies along local roads a fraction of a mile (less than 1 km) north of U.S. Route 56.

== History ==
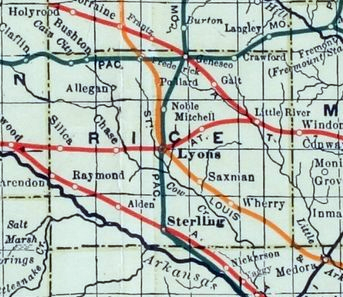
1915 railroad map of Rice County

For millennia, the land now known as Kansas was inhabited by Native Americans. In 1803, most of modern Kansas was secured by the United States as part of the Louisiana Purchase. In 1854, the Kansas Territory was organized, then in 1861 Kansas became the 34th U.S. state. In 1867, Rice County was founded.

In 1878, Atchison, Topeka and Santa Fe Railway and parties from Marion and McPherson counties chartered the Marion and McPherson Railway Company. In 1879, a branch line was built from Florence to McPherson, in 1880 it was extended to Lyons, in 1881 it was extended to Ellinwood. The line was leased and operated by the Atchison, Topeka and Santa Fe Railway. The line from Florence to Marion, was abandoned in 1968. In 1992, the line from Marion to McPherson was sold to Central Kansas Railway. In 1993, after heavy flood damage, the line from Marion to McPherson was abandoned. The original branch line connected Florence, Marion, Canada, Hillsboro, Lehigh, Canton, Galva, McPherson, Conway, Windom, Little River, Mitchell, Lyons, Chase and Ellinwood.

A post office was opened in Mitchell in 1882, and remained in operation until it was discontinued in 1953.

== Education ==
The community is served by Lyons USD 405 public school district.

== Notable people ==
- Leo B. Bozell - Advertising executive, born in Mitchell.
