= Little River–Windom USD 444 =

Public school district in Little River, Kansas

Address
- 455 W. Prairie Ave. Little River, Kansas, 67457; United States
- Coordinates: 38°23′59″N 98°0′59″W

District information
- Type: Public
- Grades: K to 12
- Schools: 2

Other information
- Website: usd444.com

Little River–Windom USD 444 is a public unified school district headquartered in Little River, Kansas, United States. The district includes the communities of Little River, Windom, and nearby rural areas.

== Schools ==
The school district operates the following schools:

- Little River High School
- Windom Elementary School

== See also ==
- Kansas State Department of Education
- Kansas State High School Activities Association
- List of high schools in Kansas
- List of unified school districts in Kansas
