= Galva, Kansas =

City in McPherson County, Kansas

- City
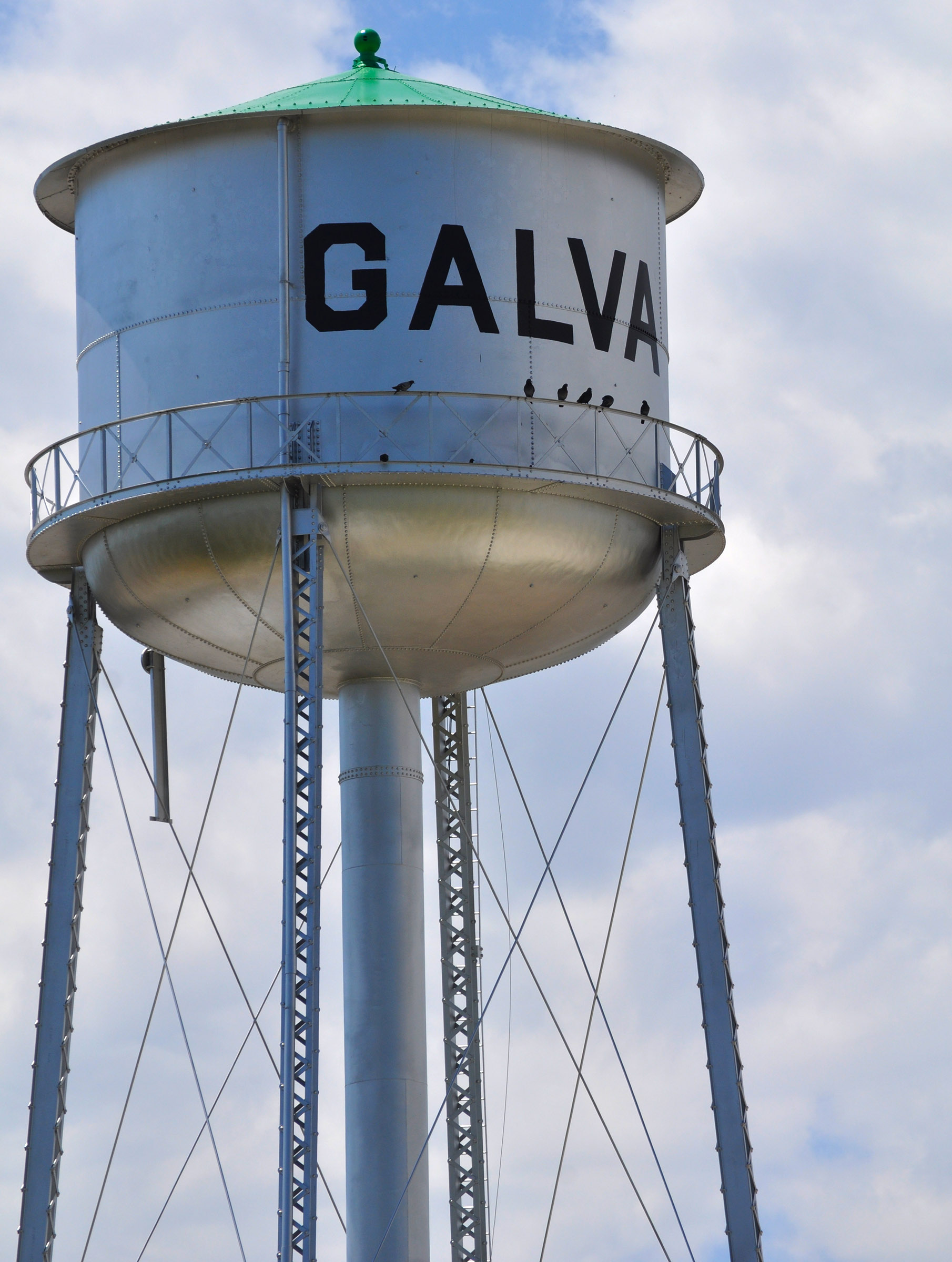
- Water Tower in Galva (2016)

- Location within McPherson County and Kansas

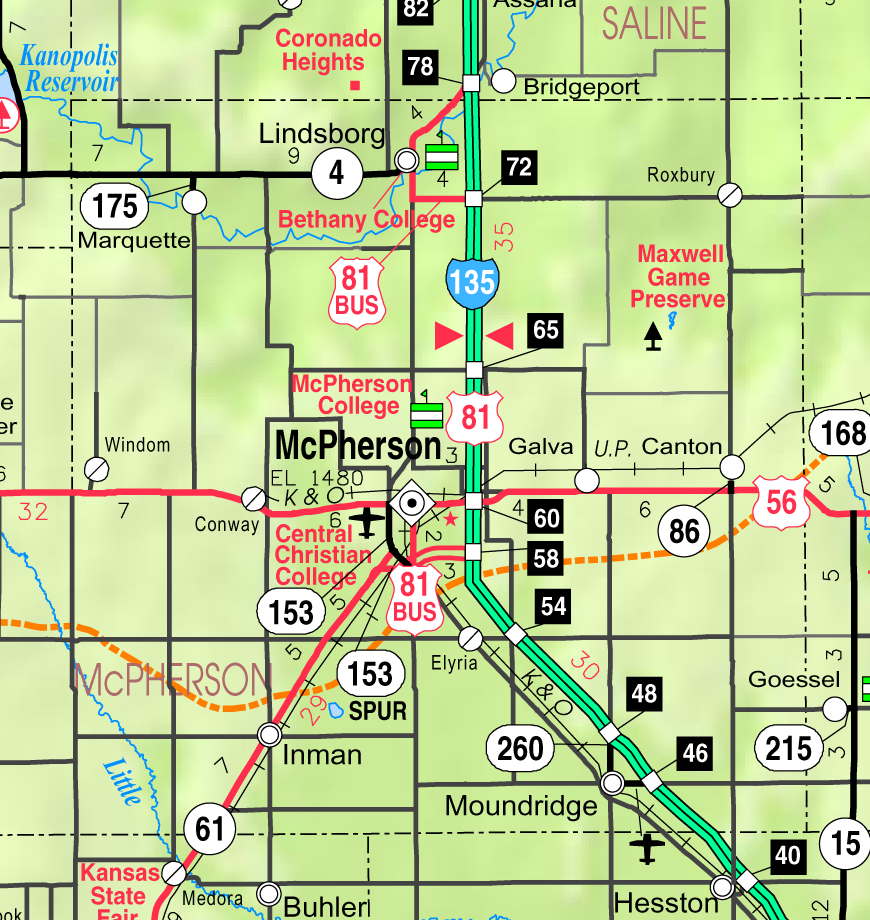
- KDOT map of McPherson County (legend)
- Coordinates: 38°23′01″N 97°32′17″W
- Country: United States
- State: Kansas
- County: McPherson
- Founded: 1879
- Incorporated: 1887
- Named for: Galva, Illinois

Government
  - Type: Mayor–Council

Area
  - Total: 0.50 sq mi (1.29 km^{2})
  - Land: 0.50 sq mi (1.29 km^{2})
  - Water: 0 sq mi (0.00 km^{2})
- Elevation: 1,545 ft (471 m)

Population (2020)
  - Total: 834
  - Density: 1,670/sq mi (647/km^{2})
- Time zone: UTC-6 (CST)
  - Summer (DST): UTC-5 (CDT)
- ZIP Code: 67443
- Area code: 620
- FIPS code: 20-25200
- GNIS ID: 2394849
- Website: cityofgalvaks.com

Galva is a city in McPherson County, Kansas, United States. As of the 2020 census, the population of the city was 834.

== History ==
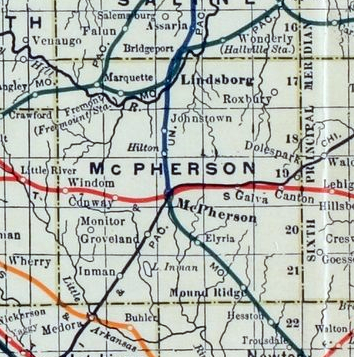
1915 railroad map of McPherson County

=== Early history ===
For millennia, the Great Plains of North America were inhabited by nomadic Native Americans. From the 16th to 18th centuries, the Kingdom of France claimed ownership of large parts of North America. In 1762, after the French and Indian War, France secretly ceded New France to Spain, by the Treaty of Fontainebleau.

=== 19th century ===
In 1802, Spain returned most of the land to France. In 1803, most of the land for modern day Kansas was acquired by the United States from France as part of the 828,000 square mile Louisiana Purchase for 2.83 cents per acre.

From the 1820s to 1870s, the Santa Fe Trail passed through, what is now McPherson County. In 1855, Charles O. Fuller established a ranch adjacent to the Running Turkey Creek Crossing about two miles south and one mile east of Galva. Fuller's Ranch provided accommodations for travelers on the Santa Fe Trail and was probably the first white settlement in McPherson County. The location is on private property with a marker nearby. The trail was active across McPherson County from 1821 to 1866.

In 1854, the Kansas Territory was organized, then in 1861 Kansas became the 34th U.S. state. In 1867, McPherson County was established within the Kansas Territory, which included the land for modern day Galva.

As early as 1875, city leaders of Marion held a meeting to consider a branch railroad from Florence. In 1878, Atchison, Topeka and Santa Fe Railway and parties from Marion and McPherson counties chartered the Marion and McPherson Railway Company. In 1879, a branch line was built from Florence to McPherson; in 1880, it was extended to Lyons and in 1881 was extended to Ellinwood. The line was leased and operated by the Atchison, Topeka and Santa Fe Railway. The line from Florence to Marion became defunct in 1968. In 1992, the line from Marion to McPherson was sold to Central Kansas Railway. In 1993, after heavy flood damage, the line from Marion through Galva to McPherson was abandoned and removed. The original branch line connected Florence, Marion, Canada, Hillsboro, Lehigh, Canton, Galva, McPherson, Conway, Windom, Little River, Mitchell, Lyons, Chase and Ellinwood.

In 1887, the Chicago, Kansas and Nebraska Railway built a main line from Herington through Galva to Pratt. In 1888, this line was extended to Liberal. Later, it was extended to Tucumcari, New Mexico and El Paso, Texas. It foreclosed in 1891 and taken over by Chicago, Rock Island and Pacific Railway, which shut down in 1980 and reorganized as Oklahoma, Kansas and Texas Railroad, merged in 1988 with Missouri Pacific Railroad, merged in 1997 with Union Pacific Railroad. Most locals still refer to this railroad as the "Rock Island".

Galva was named by Mrs. J. E. Doyle, a native of Galva, Illinois. Galva was laid out on land belonging to the Marion & McPherson Railroad Company in September 1879, and it served as a shipping point for grain and cattle. By 1883, it contained nearly 100 people, several general stores, one drug store, one hotel, one lumber yard, a hotel and livery stable, and a good schoolhouse.

== Geography ==
According to the United States Census Bureau, the city has a total area of 0.48 square miles (1.24 km^{2}), all land. Galva is situated on relatively flat topography with a single stream that only runs during wet weather through the southern part of town, flowing southwestward. The land is highly productive agriculturally with wheat, milo, soybeans the principal crops. Oil is still produced within the city limits and in the fields north, south and east of town.

=== Climate ===
The climate in this area is characterized by hot, humid summers and generally mild to cool winters. According to the Köppen Climate Classification system, Galva has a humid subtropical climate, abbreviated "Cfa" on climate maps.

== Demographics ==
Historical population
Census	Pop.	Note	%±
1880	87		—
1890	255		193.1%
1900	300		17.6%
1910	322		7.3%
1920	350		8.7%
1930	358		2.3%
1940	463		29.3%
1950	426		−8.0%
1960	442		3.8%
1970	522		18.1%
1980	651		24.7%
1990	651		0.0%
2000	701		7.7%
2010	870		24.1%
2020	834		−4.1%
U.S. Decennial Census

=== 2020 census ===
The 2020 United States census counted 834 people, 344 households, and 248 families in Galva. The population density was 1,671.3 per square mile (645.3/km^{2}). There were 380 housing units at an average density of 761.5 per square mile (294.0/km^{2}). The racial makeup was 94.6% (789) white or European American (93.29% non-Hispanic white), 0.0% (0) black or African-American, 0.12% (1) Native American or Alaska Native, 0.36% (3) Asian, 0.0% (0) Pacific Islander or Native Hawaiian, 0.36% (3) from other races, and 4.56% (38) from two or more races. Hispanic or Latino of any race was 3.6% (30) of the population.

Of the 344 households, 34.0% had children under the age of 18; 61.3% were married couples living together; 18.0% had a female householder with no spouse or partner present. 25.6% of households consisted of individuals and 12.8% had someone living alone who was 65 years of age or older. The average household size was 2.2 and the average family size was 2.4. The percent of those with a bachelor's degree or higher was estimated to be 29.6% of the population.

26.5% of the population was under the age of 18, 5.5% from 18 to 24, 25.8% from 25 to 44, 24.1% from 45 to 64, and 18.1% who were 65 years of age or older. The median age was 39.3 years. For every 100 females, there were 93.1 males. For every 100 females ages 18 and older, there were 103.0 males.

The 2016–2020 5-year American Community Survey estimates show that the median household income was $84,583 (with a margin of error of +/- $18,106) and the median family income was $105,313 (+/- $15,416). Males had a median income of $59,038 (+/- $10,699) versus $43,438 (+/- $7,325) for females. The median income for those above 16 years old was $50,068 (+/- $4,884). Approximately, 5.7% of families and 6.4% of the population were below the poverty line, including 8.6% of those under the age of 18 and 4.3% of those ages 65 or over.

=== 2010 census ===
As of the census of 2010, there were 870 people, 343 households, and 264 families residing in the city. The population density was 1,812.5 inhabitants per square mile (699.8/km^{2}). There were 369 housing units at an average density of 768.8 per square mile (296.8/km^{2}). The racial makeup of the city was 98.3% White, 0.2% African American, 0.3% Asian, 0.1% from other races, and 1.0% from two or more races. Hispanic or Latino of any race were 0.9% of the population.

There were 343 households, of which 37.9% had children under the age of 18 living with them, 66.5% were married couples living together, 6.7% had a female householder with no husband present, 3.8% had a male householder with no wife present, and 23.0% were non-families. 20.4% of all households were made up of individuals, and 8.2% had someone living alone who was 65 years of age or older. The average household size was 2.54 and the average family size was 2.90.

The median age in the city was 35.9 years. 27.2% of residents were under the age of 18; 6.5% were between the ages of 18 and 24; 28.9% were from 25 to 44; 25.6% were from 45 to 64; and 11.8% were 65 years of age or older. The gender makeup of the city was 49.7% male and 50.3% female.

=== 2000 census ===
As of the census of 2000, there were 701 people, 273 households, and 206 families residing in the city. The population density was 1,487.1 inhabitants per square mile (574.2/km^{2}). There were 297 housing units at an average density of 630.1 per square mile (243.3/km^{2}). The racial makeup of the city was 97.15% White, 0.14% African American, 0.57% Native American, 0.43% Asian, 0.29% from other races, and 1.43% from two or more races. Hispanic or Latino of any race were 1.00% of the population.

There were 273 households, out of which 37.7% had children under the age of 18 living with them, 66.3% were married couples living together, 6.2% had a female householder with no husband present, and 24.2% were non-families. 20.5% of all households were made up of individuals, and 8.8% had someone living alone who was 65 years of age or older. The average household size was 2.57 and the average family size was 2.99.

In the city, the population was spread out, with 28.7% under the age of 18, 8.1% from 18 to 24, 30.8% from 25 to 44, 20.3% from 45 to 64, and 12.1% who were 65 years of age or older. The median age was 34 years. For every 100 females, there were 98.0 males. For every 100 females age 18 and over, there were 96.1 males.

The median income for a household in the city was $42,500, and the median income for a family was $47,212. Males had a median income of $32,917 versus $20,875 for females. The per capita income for the city was $18,021. About 6.2% of families and 6.6% of the population were below the poverty line, including 9.4% of those under age 18 and none of those age 65 or over.

=== Religion ===
Christian Churches are composed of a Galva Community Church congregation and the Galva Christian Church (Disciples In Christ) congregation within the city limits; Lone Tree Mennonite (Church of God in Christ - Holdeman) located six miles south, one-half mile east and one-quarter mile south of town; United Center Mennonite (Church of God in Christ - Holdeman) located three miles east and one mile north of town; Immanuel Lutheran Church (Missouri Synod) located seven miles south and five miles east.

== Education ==
The community is served by Canton-Galva USD 419 public school district. This school district includes:

- Canton-Galva Jr/Sr High School (7–12), located in Canton
- Canton-Galva Elementary School (K–6), located in Galva

Canton and Galva schools unified in 1972 forming Canton-Galva High School with the Eagles mascot. Prior to unification, the Galva High School mascot was Galva Chieftains.

== Media ==
=== Print ===
- McPherson Sentinel, regional newspaper from McPherson.
- The Salina Journal, regional newspaper from Salina.

== Infrastructure ==
=== Utilities ===
- Internet
  - Broadband connection is provided by Home Communications (HCI).
  - Wireless is provided by Pixius Communications, Rise Broadband, Verizon.
  - Satellite is provided by HughesNet, StarBand, WildBlue.
- TV
  - Digital TV provided by Home Communications (HCI).
  - Satellite is provided by DirecTV, Dish Network.
  - Terrestrial is provided by regional digital TV stations.
- Telephone
  - Landline provided by Home Communications (HCI).
- Electricity
  - City is provided by City of Galva.
  - Rural is provided by DSO, McPherson BPU, Westar Energy.
- Natural Gas
  - Service is provided by Kansas Gas Service.
- Water
  - City is provided by City of Galva.
  - Rural is provided by RWD #4.
- Sewer
  - Service is provided by City of Galva.
- Trash
  - Service is provided by McPherson Area Solid Waste Utility.

== See also ==
- List of people from McPherson County, Kansas
- Santa Fe Trail
- List of longest-serving mayors in the United States
