= List of National Historic Landmarks in Kansas =

Kansas National Historic Landmarks (clickable map)

This is a list of all National Historic Landmarks designated by the U.S. government in Kansas. There are 26 National Historic Landmarks (NHLs) in Kansas.

The United States National Historic Landmark program is operated under the auspices of the National Park Service, and recognizes structures, districts, objects, and similar resources according to a list of criteria of national significance.

The state of Kansas is home to 26 of these landmarks, illustrating the state's military and frontier heritage, as well as its contributions to the broader themes of the Civil Rights Movement, the Progressive Movement, and others.

== Key ==
	National Historic Landmark
^{†}	National Historic Landmark District
^{#}	National Historic Site, National Historical Park, National Memorial, or National Monument
^{*}	Delisted Landmark

== National Historic Landmarks ==
	Landmark name	Image	Date designated	Location	County	Description
1	Black Jack Battlefield	Black Jack Battlefield	October 16, 2012 (#04000365)	Baldwin City; 38°45′42″N 95°07′50″W	Douglas	The three-hour Battle of Black Jack, fought on June 2, 1856, marked a culmination of escalating violence in "Bleeding Kansas" and the beginning of John Brown's war on slavery, which would culminate in his raid on Harpers Ferry three years later.
2^{†}	Council Grove Historic District	Council Grove Historic District	May 23, 1963 (#66000347)	Council Grove; 38°39′38″N 96°29′23″W	Morris	Here, in 1825, the United States and the Osage Nation negotiated a treaty that guaranteed safe passage through Osage territory to caravans on the Santa Fe Trail. Providing water, feed, and timber, it later became a natural stopping place on the trail.
3^{†}	El Cuartelejo	El Cuartelejo	July 19, 1964 (#66000351)	Scott City; 38°40′41″N 100°54′51″W	Scott	This archeological district consists of more than 20 sites, mostly associated with the Dismal River/Plains Apache culture, dating from c CE 1650 to 1750. The principal site is a pueblo ruin thought to have been built by Taos Indians who sought refuge with the Apache during times of trouble with the Spanish. It is the northeasternmost example of a pueblo in the country. The site also illustrates Spanish explorations in the Great Plains that predates those of the United States.
4^{#}	Fort Larned	Fort Larned	December 19, 1960 (#66000107)	Larned; 38°10′25″N 99°11′56″W	Pawnee	From 1860 until 1878, this was the most important fort guarding the northern portion of the Santa Fe Trail. Abandoned, the fort became private property and the center of a large ranching operation. It has been restored to the 1860s period to serve as one of the nation's best-preserved mid-19th century western military posts, consisting of one-story stone buildings are arranged around a quadrangle.
5^{†}	Fort Leavenworth	Fort Leavenworth	December 19, 1960 (#66000346)	Leavenworth; 39°21′18″N 94°55′16″W	Leavenworth	This fort has been in continuous occupation by the United States Army since it was first established in 1827 to protect caravans on the Santa Fe Trail. It played pivotal roles in the Mexican and Civil Wars, and it became the temporary capital of the Kansas Territory in 1854.
6^{#}	Fort Scott	Fort Scott	July 19, 1964 (#66000106)	Fort Scott; 37°50′31″N 94°42′17″W	Bourbon	This fort, established in 1842 and abandoned in 1853, served first as a frontier outpost along the "Permanent Indian Frontier", then as a Civil War garrison. During the Civil War, the fort was a major focal point of black troop activity and training.
7^{†}	Haskell Institute	Haskell Institute	July 4, 1961 (#66000342)	Lawrence; 38°56′23″N 95°13′58″W	Douglas	
8	Hollenberg (Cottonwood) Pony Express Station	Hollenberg (Cottonwood) Pony Express Station	November 5, 1961 (#66000352)	Hanover; 39°53′56″N 96°50′37″W	Washington	Built by Gerat H. Hollenberg in 1858, this cabin was associated with the Oregon and California Trails, the Pony Express, and the Butterfield Overland Mail. Hollenberg traded with emigrants on the trails, operated the westernmost Pony Express station in Kansas, and provided relay services for the Overland Mail. The building has never been moved and retains its original dimensions.
9	Lecompton Constitution Hall	Lecompton Constitution Hall	May 30, 1974 (#71000312)	Lecompton; 39°02′37″N 95°23′40″W	Douglas	
10	Lower Cimarron Spring	Lower Cimarron Spring	December 19, 1960 (#66000344)	Ulysses; 37°23′54″N 101°22′15″W	Grant	
11	Marais des Cygnes Massacre Site	Marais des Cygnes Massacre Site	May 30, 1974 (#71000317)	Trading Post; 38°16′53″N 94°37′16″W	Linn	
12	Medicine Lodge Peace Treaty Site	Medicine Lodge Peace Treaty Site	August 4, 1969 (#69000059)	Medicine Lodge; 37°15′55″N 98°35′35″W	Barber	
13	Carrie A. Nation House	Carrie A. Nation House	May 11, 1976 (#71000303)	Medicine Lodge; 37°16′32″N 98°34′55″W	Barber	
14^{†}	Nicodemus Historic District	Nicodemus Historic District	January 7, 1976 (#76000820)	Nicodemus; 39°23′40″N 99°37′01″W	Graham	Established by African Americans during the Reconstruction Period following the Civil War, the town of Nicodemus symbolizes the pioneer spirit of people formerly enslaved. Established on homestead land, the town of Nicodemus was officially founded on September 17, 1877. It is the only remaining town of the "Exoduster" movement, which was organized mainly through the efforts of Benjamin "Pap" Singleton, who was responsible for founding 11 colonies in Kansas between 1873 and 1880.
15	Norman No. 1 Oil Well	Norman No. 1 Oil Well	December 22, 1977 (#74000846)	Neodesha; 37°24′53″N 95°40′23″W	Wilson	
16	Parker Carousel	Parker Carousel	February 27, 1987 (#87000813)	Abilene; 38°54′34″N 97°12′31″W	Dickinson	One of three surviving carousels of the Abilene-based Charles W. Parker Carousel Company
17	Santa Fe Trail Remains	Santa Fe Trail Remains	May 23, 1963 (#66000343)	Dodge City; 37°47′31″N 100°11′49″W	Ford	Two mile section of old Santa Fe Trail ruts
18	Shawnee Mission	Shawnee Mission	May 23, 1968 (#66000345)	Fairway; 39°01′59″N 94°37′27″W	Johnson	
19^{†}	Spring Hill Ranch	Spring Hill Ranch	February 18, 1997 (#08000828)	Strong City; 38°25′58″N 96°33′32″W	Chase	Centerpiece of the Tallgrass Prairie National Preserve
20	Sumner Elementary School/ Monroe Elementary School	Sumner Elementary School	May 4, 1987 (#87001283)	Topeka; 39°03′30″N 95°40′59″W	Shawnee	School involved with the Supreme Court Case Brown v. Board of Education
21^{†}	Tobias-Thompson Complex	Tobias-Thompson Complex	July 4, 1964 (#66000349)	Geneseo	Rice	Archaeological site
22^{†}	Warkentin Farm		December 14, 1990 (#74000839)	Halstead; 38°00′25″N 97°30′15″W	Harvey	Homestead of Bernhard Warkentin.
23^{†}	Western Branch, National Home for Disabled Volunteer Soldiers	Western Branch, National Home for Disabled Volunteer Soldiers	June 17, 2011 (#99000456)	Leavenworth; 39°16′43″N 94°53′29″W	Leavenworth	
24	William Allen White House	William Allen White House	May 11, 1976 (#71000318)	Emporia; 38°24′32″N 96°10′30″W	Lyon	Home of influential Progressive journalist William Allen White from 1899 until his death in 1944
25	Whiteford (Price) Site	Whiteford (Price) Site	July 19, 1964 (#66000350)	Salina; 38°51′36″N 97°31′58″W	Saline	An archaeological site of human occupation during 1000-1300 AD.
26	Wyandotte National Burying Ground, Eliza Burton Conley Burial Site	Wyandotte National Burying Ground, Eliza Burton Conley Burial Site	December 23, 2016 (#100000794)	Kansas City; 39°06′53″N 94°37′34″W	Wyandotte	

== See also ==
- List of U.S. National Historic Landmarks by state
- National Register of Historic Places listings in Kansas
- Historic preservation
- National Register of Historic Places
- History of Kansas
- List of National Natural Landmarks in Kansas
