= Lyons USD 405 =

Public school district in Lyons, Kansas

Address
- 800 S. Workman St. Lyons, Kansas, 67554; United States
- Coordinates: 38°20′23″N 98°11′53″W

District information
- Type: Public
- Grades: K to 12
- Schools: 4

Other information
- Website: usd405.com

Lyons USD 405 is a public unified school district headquartered in Lyons, Kansas, United States. The district includes the communities of Lyons, Mitchell, Pollard, and nearby rural areas.

== Schools ==
The school district operates the following schools:

- Lyons High School
- Lyons Middle School
- Central Elementary School
- Park Elementary School

== See also ==
- Kansas State Department of Education
- Kansas State High School Activities Association
- List of high schools in Kansas
- List of unified school districts in Kansas
