= Whiteford (Price) Archeological Site =

Historic site in Saline County, Kansas, US

- U.S. National Register of Historic Places
- U.S. National Historic Landmark
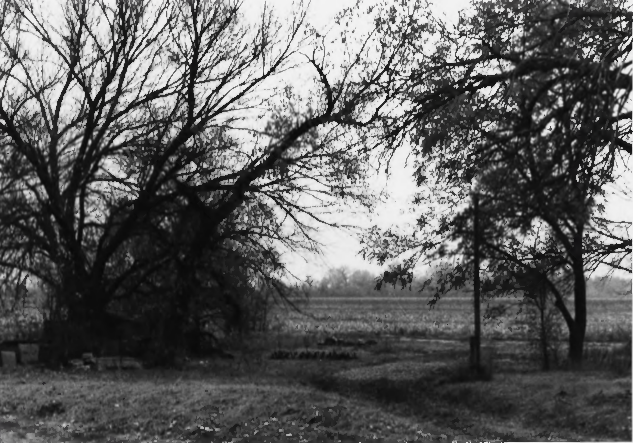
- The site in 1975

- Location within Kansas Location within the United States
- Nearest city: New Cambria, Kansas
- Coordinates: 38°51′39″N 97°31′36″W
- Area: 135 acres (55 ha)
- Built: 1000
- NRHP reference No.: 66000350

Significant dates
- Added to NRHP: October 15, 1966
- Designated NHL: July 19, 1964

The Whiteford (Price) Archeological Site, designated by the Smithsonian trinomial 14SA1, is an archaeological site located in a rural area between Salina and New Cambria, Kansas, United States. As a National Historic Landmark, it is an important Central Plains habitation site, with an unusually well-preserved burial complex. It is on private land, and is not open to the public.

== Overview ==
The site is located on private property in rural Saline County, Kansas, between the cities of Salina and New Cambria, about 0.6 mile southeast of the corner of U.S. Route 40 and Simpson Rd, and north of Smoky Hill River. It occupies a portion of alluvial flood plain between the Smoky Hill and Saline Rivers, whose confluence lies to the east. It is unknown exactly what courses the rivers would have followed at the time of the site's occupation.

The site's features are interpreted as being of a small village, with twelve to fifteen low mounds, identified as house sites in the 1930s. The features were destroyed since by agriculture. These sites, and others that may have predated that survey, are now identifiable only by shallow deposits of cultural materials. Dating of finds at the site yields an occupation time of about 1000 to 1350 CE.

A former Kansas Historical Marker sign along U.S. Route 40 described it as follows:

Several hundred years ago, perhaps more than a thousand, this valley was inhabited by men whose average height was probably well over six feet. These were not the indians of quivira, whose "7-foot warriors" Coronado described in 1541, but an even earlier people. Here they lived in earth lodges, tilling the soil, hunting and fishing, and here they left records of unusual archaeological importance. One mile southeast of this marker is a burial pit containing more than 140 skeletal remains that demonstrate the remarkable size and strength of these prehistoric indians. The pit was discovered in 1936. It has been scientifically excavated, with the skeletons still preserved in the same flexed positions of their burial centuries ago. Among the objects found in the pit are pieces of pottery, a grinding stone, parched corn and beans. A stone tomahawk, ceremonial flint knives, and clam-shell beads and ear pendants.

== History ==
In 1873, Benjamin Marlin accidentally encountered bones when he was constructing a dugout home on his land. In 1936, Guy and Mabel Whiteford started excavating the site. For many decades, it was a tourist trap called the Indian Burial Pit or Salina Burial Pit. It was declared a U.S. National Historic Landmark in 1964. In 1989, the state of Kansas purchased the site. In 1990, the pit was filled with sand and covered with a concrete cap to protect it, then covered with dirt and grass.

== See also ==
- List of National Historic Landmarks in Kansas
- National Register of Historic Places listings in Saline County, Kansas
