= Little River, Kansas =

City in Rice County, Kansas

- City
- Location within Rice County and Kansas

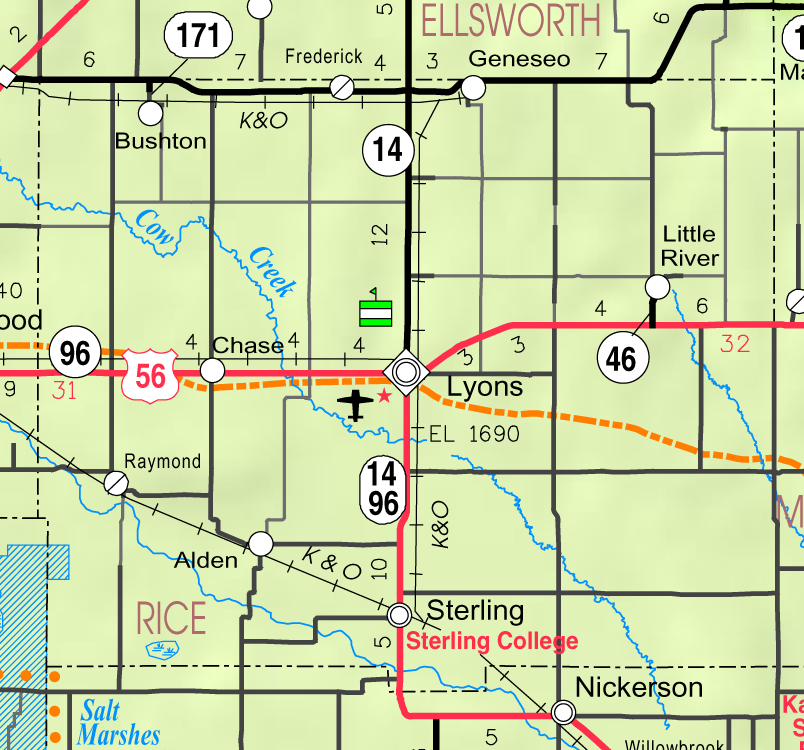
- KDOT map of Rice County (legend)
- Coordinates: 38°23′54″N 98°00′54″W
- Country: United States
- State: Kansas
- County: Rice
- Township: Union
- Founded: 1880
- Incorporated: 1886
- Named for: Little Arkansas River

Area
  - Total: 0.39 sq mi (1.01 km^{2})
  - Land: 0.39 sq mi (1.01 km^{2})
  - Water: 0 sq mi (0.00 km^{2})
- Elevation: 1,618 ft (493 m)

Population (2020)
  - Total: 472
  - Density: 1,210/sq mi (467/km^{2})
- Time zone: UTC-6 (CST)
  - Summer (DST): UTC-5 (CDT)
- ZIP Code: 67457
- Area code: 620
- FIPS code: 20-41575
- GNIS ID: 2395735
- Website: littleriverks.com/wordpress/

Little River is a city in Rice County, Kansas, United States. As of the 2020 census, the population of the city was 472.

== History ==
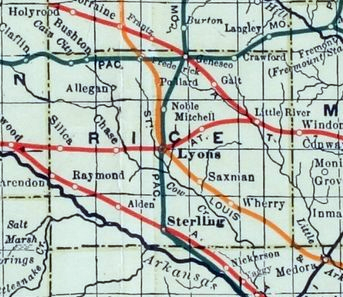
1915 railroad map of Rice County

For millennia, the land now known as Kansas was inhabited by Native Americans. In 1803, most of modern Kansas was secured by the United States as part of the Louisiana Purchase. In 1854, the Kansas Territory was organized, then in 1861 Kansas became the 34th U.S. state. In 1867, Rice County was founded.

Little River was founded in 1880. The town was named from its situation upon the Little Arkansas River.

In 1878, Atchison, Topeka and Santa Fe Railway and parties from Marion and McPherson counties chartered the Marion and McPherson Railway Company. In 1879, a branch line was built from Florence to McPherson; in 1880 it was extended to Lyons and in 1881 it was extended to Ellinwood. The line was leased and operated by the Atchison, Topeka and Santa Fe Railway. The line from Florence to Marion, was abandoned in 1968. In 1992, the line from Marion to McPherson was sold to Central Kansas Railway. In 1993, after heavy flood damage, the line from Marion to McPherson was abandoned. The original branch line connected Florence, Marion, Canada, Hillsboro, Lehigh, Canton, Galva, McPherson, Conway, Windom, Little River, Mitchell, Lyons, Chase and Ellinwood.

== Geography ==
According to the United States Census Bureau, the city has a total area of 0.44 square miles (1.14 km^{2}), all land.

== Demographics ==
Historical population
Census	Pop.	Note	%±
1890	340		—
1900	457		34.4%
1910	661		44.6%
1920	749		13.3%
1930	618		−17.5%
1940	603		−2.4%
1950	635		5.3%
1960	552		−13.1%
1970	493		−10.7%
1980	529		7.3%
1990	496		−6.2%
2000	536		8.1%
2010	557		3.9%
2020	472		−15.3%
U.S. Decennial Census

=== 2020 census ===
The 2020 United States census counted 472 people, 187 households, and 115 families in Little River. The population density was 1,210.3 per square mile (467.3/km^{2}). There were 221 housing units at an average density of 566.7 per square mile (218.8/km^{2}). The racial makeup was 95.97% (453) white or European American (94.7% non-Hispanic white), 0.0% (0) black or African-American, 0.64% (3) Native American or Alaska Native, 0.0% (0) Asian, 0.0% (0) Pacific Islander or Native Hawaiian, 0.64% (3) from other races, and 2.75% (13) from two or more races. Hispanic or Latino of any race was 3.18% (15) of the population.

Of the 187 households, 28.3% had children under the age of 18; 47.6% were married couples living together; 26.7% had a female householder with no spouse or partner present. 33.7% of households consisted of individuals and 17.1% had someone living alone who was 65 years of age or older. The average household size was 2.1 and the average family size was 2.9. The percent of those with a bachelor's degree or higher was estimated to be 16.9% of the population.

22.5% of the population was under the age of 18, 10.0% from 18 to 24, 19.3% from 25 to 44, 23.7% from 45 to 64, and 24.6% who were 65 years of age or older. The median age was 43.5 years. For every 100 females, there were 111.7 males. For every 100 females ages 18 and older, there were 115.3 males.

The 2016–2020 5-year American Community Survey estimates show that the median household income was $46,786 (with a margin of error of +/- $12,262) and the median family income was $64,444 (+/- $17,737). Males had a median income of $39,861 (+/- $8,444) versus $23,333 (+/- $6,824) for females. The median income for those above 16 years old was $32,159 (+/- $8,999). Approximately, 13.9% of families and 12.7% of the population were below the poverty line, including 23.7% of those under the age of 18 and 17.9% of those ages 65 or over.

=== 2010 census ===
As of the census of 2010, there were 557 people, 207 households, and 136 families residing in the city. The population density was 1,265.9 inhabitants per square mile (488.8/km^{2}). There were 246 housing units at an average density of 559.1 per square mile (215.9/km^{2}). The racial makeup of the city was 98.2% White, 0.7% Native American, 0.4% from other races, and 0.7% from two or more races. Hispanic or Latino of any race were 1.6% of the population.

There were 207 households, of which 35.3% had children under the age of 18 living with them, 50.7% were married couples living together, 9.2% had a female householder with no husband present, 5.8% had a male householder with no wife present, and 34.3% were non-families. 31.4% of all households were made up of individuals, and 15% had someone living alone who was 65 years of age or older. The average household size was 2.53 and the average family size was 3.20.

The median age in the city was 37.2 years. 28.9% of residents were under the age of 18; 5.3% were between the ages of 18 and 24; 25.9% were from 25 to 44; 19.5% were from 45 to 64; and 20.5% were 65 years of age or older. The gender makeup of the city was 47.9% male and 52.1% female.

== Education ==
The community is served by Little River–Windom USD 444 public school district.

=== Sports ===
The Little River Redskins have won the following Kansas State High School championships:

- 1970 Football - Class 1A
- 1971 Football - Class 1A
- 1974 Boys Basketball - Class 1A
- 1976 Girls Track & Field - Class 1A
- 1976 Girls Track & Field (Indoor) - Class 1A
- 1977 Girls Track & Field - Class 1A
- 1978 Girls Track & Field (Indoor) - Class 1A
- 1979 Girls Track & Field - Class 1A
- 1981 Football - Class 1A
- 1984 Girls Volleyball - Class 2A
- 1995 Girls Basketball - Class 1A
- 1996 Football - Class 8-Man DI
- 1996 Girls Basketball - Class 1A
- 1997 Girls Basketball - Class 1A
- 1998 Girls Basketball - Class 1A
- 1999 Football - Class 8-Man DI
- 2020 Football - Class 8-Man DI
- 2022 Volleyball - Class 1A DI
- 2023 Volleyball - Class 1A DI
- 2024 Volleyball - Class 1A DI

== See also ==
- National Register of Historic Places listings in Rice County, Kansas
