= Lyons, Kansas =

City in Rice County, Kansas

- City and County seat
- Location within Rice County and Kansas

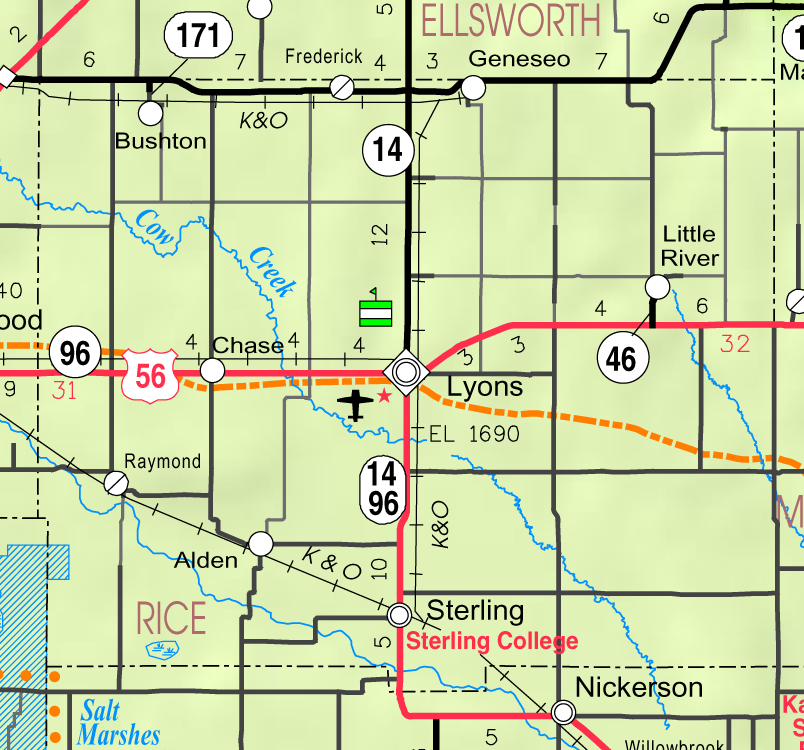
- KDOT map of Rice County (legend)
- Coordinates: 38°20′46″N 98°12′16″W
- Country: United States
- State: Kansas
- County: Rice
- Township: Atlanta & Harrison
- Founded: 1870
- Incorporated: 1880
- Named for: Freeman Lyons

Area
  - Total: 2.59 sq mi (6.70 km^{2})
  - Land: 2.59 sq mi (6.70 km^{2})
  - Water: 0 sq mi (0.00 km^{2})
- Elevation: 1,693 ft (516 m)

Population (2020)
  - Total: 3,611
  - Density: 1,400/sq mi (539/km^{2})
- Time zone: UTC-6 (CST)
  - Summer (DST): UTC-5 (CDT)
- ZIP Code: 67554
- Area code: 620
- FIPS code: 20-43525
- GNIS ID: 485616
- Website: lyonsks.org

Lyons is a city in and the county seat of Rice County, Kansas, United States. As of the 2020 census, the population of the city was 3,611.

== History ==
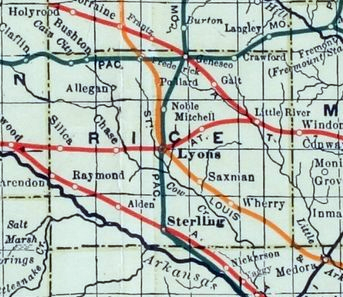
1915 railroad map of Rice County

For millennia, the land now known as Kansas was inhabited by Native Americans.

Although Coronado's exact route across the plains is uncertain and has been widely disputed, his men and he are thought to have camped near the present location of Lyons on their quest for Quivira, a Native American place that Indians to the southwest had told them was fabulously wealthy in gold.

West of Lyons is a cross commemorating Juan de Padilla, a member of Coronado's expedition, who returned the following year as a missionary. He was killed in 1542 by Native Americans after establishing a church in the area, and is considered the first Christian martyr in North America.

In 1803, most of modern Kansas was secured by the United States as part of the Louisiana Purchase.

Lyons Main Street (U.S. Highway 56) is based on the Santa Fe Trail.

In 1854, the Kansas Territory was organized, then in 1861 Kansas became the 34th U.S. state. In 1867, Rice County was founded.

Lyons was originally called Atlanta, and under the latter name was founded in 1870. It was renamed Lyons in 1876, in honor of Freeman J. Lyons.

In 1878, Atchison, Topeka and Santa Fe Railway and parties from Marion County and McPherson County chartered the Marion and McPherson Railway Company. In 1879, a branch line was built from Florence to McPherson, in 1880, it was extended to Lyons, and in 1881, it was extended to Ellinwood. The line was leased and operated by the Atchison, Topeka and Santa Fe Railway. The line from Florence to Marion, was abandoned in 1968. In 1992, the line from Marion to McPherson was sold to Central Kansas Railway. In 1993, after heavy flood damage, the line from Marion to McPherson was abandoned. The original branch line connected Florence, Marion, Canada, Hillsboro, Lehigh, Canton, Galva, McPherson, Conway, Windom, Little River, Mitchell, Lyons, Chase, and Ellinwood.

Lyons was incorporated as a city in 1880, the same year the railroad was built through it.

In 1890, the Western Salt Company put down its first shaft to mine salt in Lyons.

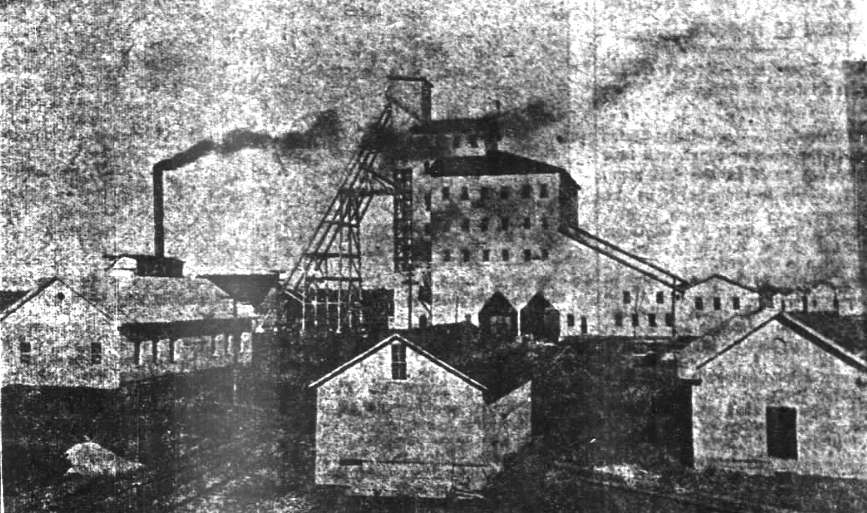
American Salt & Coal Co. salt mining plant (1919)

Lyons was home to a minor league baseball team. The Lyons Lions team played from 1909 to 1913. Lyons teams played as members of the Class D level Kansas State League from 1909 to 1911, the Central Kansas League in 1912 and Kansas State League in 1913. The Lyons franchise permanently folded after the 1913 season.

In the 1970s, the federal government was interested in using a local site for the burial of high-level nuclear waste.

== Geography ==
According to the United States Census Bureau, the city has a total area of 2.36 square miles (6.11 km^{2}), all land.

=== Climate ===
According to the Köppen climate classification, Lyons has a humid continental climate, Dfa on climate maps.

== Demographics ==
Historical population
Census	Pop.	Note	%±
1880	509		—
1890	1,754		244.6%
1900	1,736		−1.0%
1910	2,071		19.3%
1920	2,516		21.5%
1930	2,939		16.8%
1940	4,497		53.0%
1950	4,545		1.1%
1960	4,592		1.0%
1970	4,355		−5.2%
1980	4,134		−5.1%
1990	3,688		−10.8%
2000	3,732		1.2%
2010	3,739		0.2%
2020	3,611		−3.4%
U.S. Decennial Census

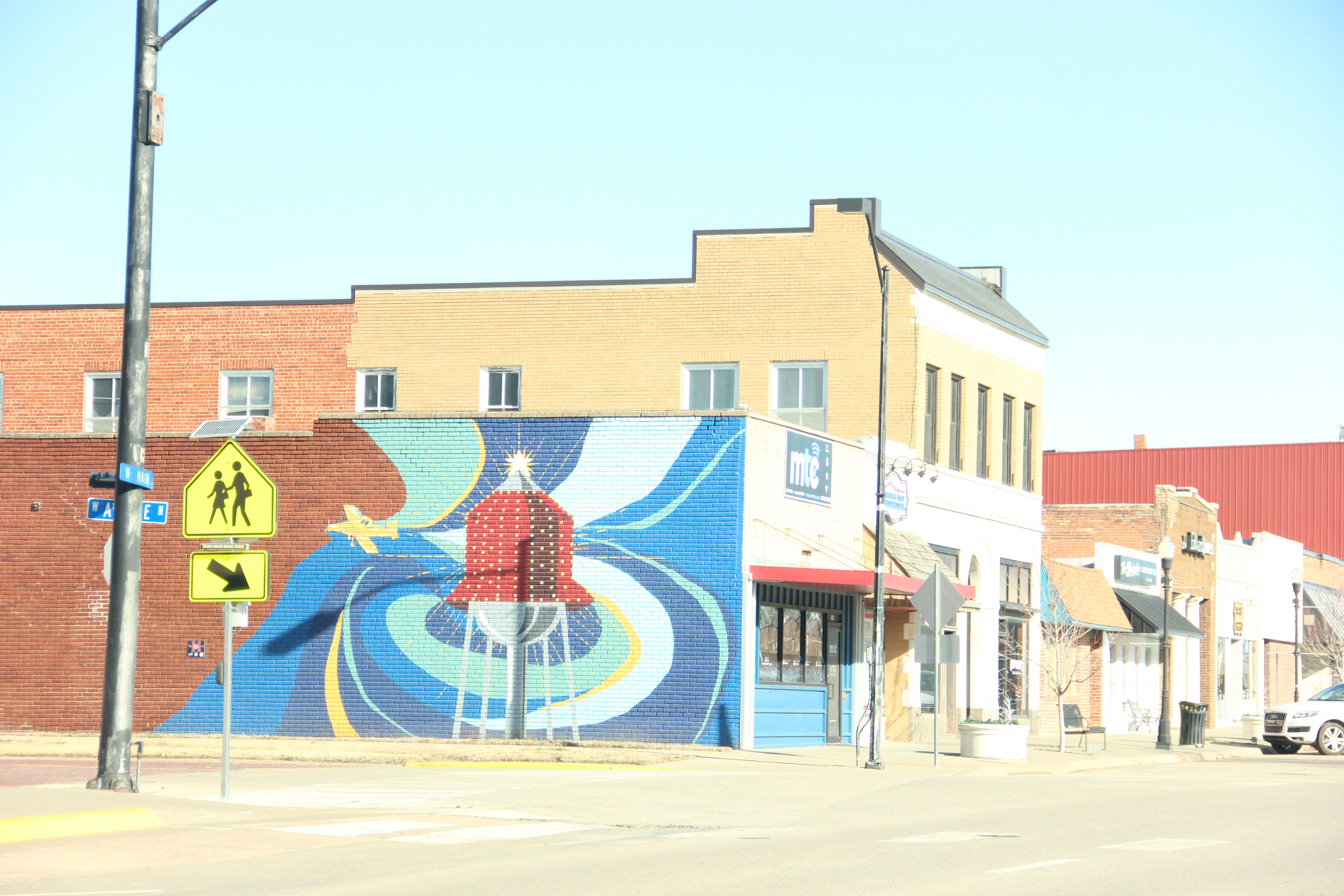
Mural in downtown Lyons (2026)

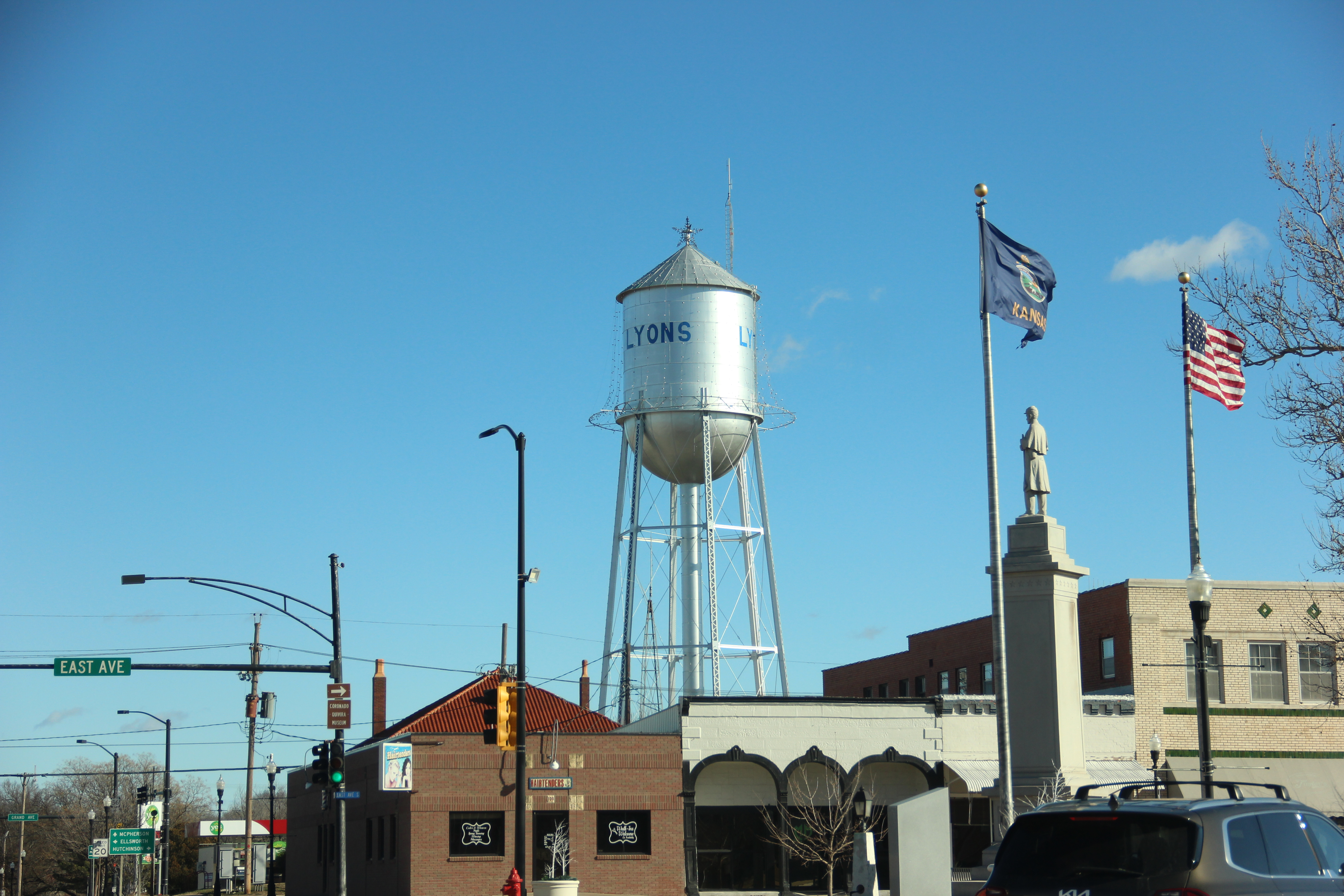
Lyons water tower (2026)

=== 2020 census ===
As of the 2020 census, Lyons had a population of 3,611 people, with 1,462 households and 946 families. The population density was 1,396.4 per square mile (539.1/km^{2}). There were 1,712 housing units at an average density of 662.0 per square mile (255.6/km^{2}).

There were 1,712 housing units, of which 14.6% were vacant. The homeowner vacancy rate was 4.0%, and the rental vacancy rate was 18.9%. 0.0% of residents lived in urban areas, while 100.0% lived in rural areas.

Of the 1,462 households, 33.7% had children under the age of 18 living in them. Of all households, 47.2% were married-couple households, 19.2% were households with a male householder and no spouse or partner present, and 26.7% were households with a female householder and no spouse or partner present. About 30.3% of all households were made up of individuals, and 14.1% had someone living alone who was 65 years of age or older. The average household size was 2.2, and the average family size was 2.7.

The median age was 38.1 years. 25.4% of residents were under the age of 18, 7.8% were from 18 to 24, 24.2% were from 25 to 44, 23.4% were from 45 to 64, and 19.2% were 65 years of age or older. For every 100 females there were 97.3 males, and for every 100 females age 18 and over there were 93.0 males age 18 and over.

Racial composition as of the 2020 census
Race	Number	Percent
White	2,689	74.5%
Black or African American	38	1.1%
American Indian and Alaska Native	28	0.8%
Asian	6	0.2%
Native Hawaiian and Other Pacific Islander	0	0.0%
Some other race	293	8.1%
Two or more races	557	15.4%
Hispanic or Latino (of any race)	923	25.6%

The non-Hispanic white population was 68.4%.

Demographic estimates

The 2016−2020 5-year American Community Survey estimates show that 9.8% of the population had a bachelor's degree or higher.

Income and poverty

The 2016−2020 5-year American Community Survey estimates show that the median household income was $49,448 (with a margin of error of +/- $7,166) and the median family income was $59,300 (+/- $2,547). Males had a median income of $45,171 (+/- $7,807) versus $23,971 (+/- $8,357) for females. The median income for those above 16 years old was $35,827 (+/- $4,782). Approximately, 6.0% of families and 13.3% of the population were below the poverty line, including 17.6% of those under the age of 18 and 14.8% of those ages 65 or over.

=== 2010 census ===
As of the census of 2010, there were 3,739 people, 1,503 households, and 952 families living in the city. The population density was 1,584.3 inhabitants per square mile (611.7/km^{2}). There were 1,716 housing units at an average density of 727.1 per square mile (280.7/km^{2}). The racial makeup of the city was 85.7% White, 1.3% African American, 0.9% Native American, 0.4% Asian, 0.1% Pacific Islander, 7.9% from other races, and 3.8% from two or more races. Hispanic or Latino of any race were 20.3% of the population.

There were 1,503 households, of which 31.3% had children under the age of 18 living with them, 49.0% were married couples living together, 8.6% had a female householder with no husband present, 5.7% had a male householder with no wife present, and 36.7% were non-families. 32.1% of all households were made up of individuals, and 16.4% had someone living alone who was 65 years of age or older. The average household size was 2.42 and the average family size was 3.04.

The median age in the city was 38.2 years. 25.8% of residents were under the age of 18; 9.1% were between the ages of 18 and 24; 22.5% were from 25 to 44; 23.8% were from 45 to 64; and 18.9% were 65 years of age or older. The gender makeup of the city was 49.0% male and 51.0% female.

== Economics ==
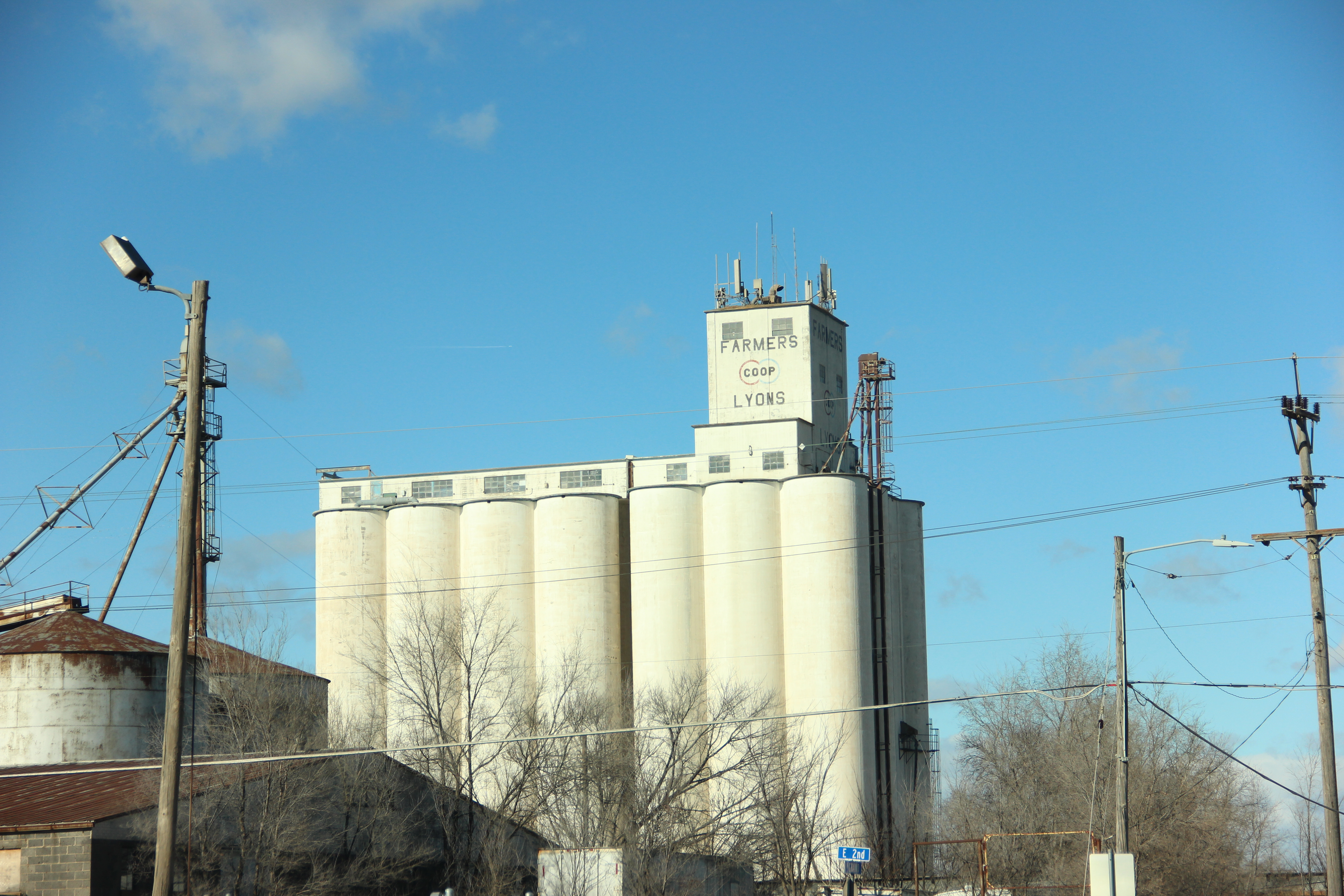
Farmer's Co-op grain elevator (2026)

Lyons Salt Company and Compass Minerals is located on the southeastern side of Lyons.

== Education ==
The community is served by Lyons USD 405 public school district.

== Notable people ==
Notable individuals who were born in and/or have lived in Lyons include:

- William Borah (1865−1940), U.S. Senator from Idaho
- Marshall Christmann (born 1976), Kansas state legislator
- James Fankhauser (1939−2025), conductor, singer
- Orville Harrold (1878−1933), actor, opera singer
- Shirley Knight (1938−2020), Hollywood actress
- James Pulliam (1925−2005), architect
- Marcia Rodd (1938−2025), actress
- Jerry Cox Vasconcells (1892−1950), U.S. Army captain, World War I flying ace
- Milton R. Wolf (born 1971), radiologist, Kansas politician

== See also ==
- National Register of Historic Places listings in Rice County, Kansas
- Santa Fe Trail
