= Chase, Kansas =

City in Rice County, Kansas

- City
- Location within Rice County and Kansas

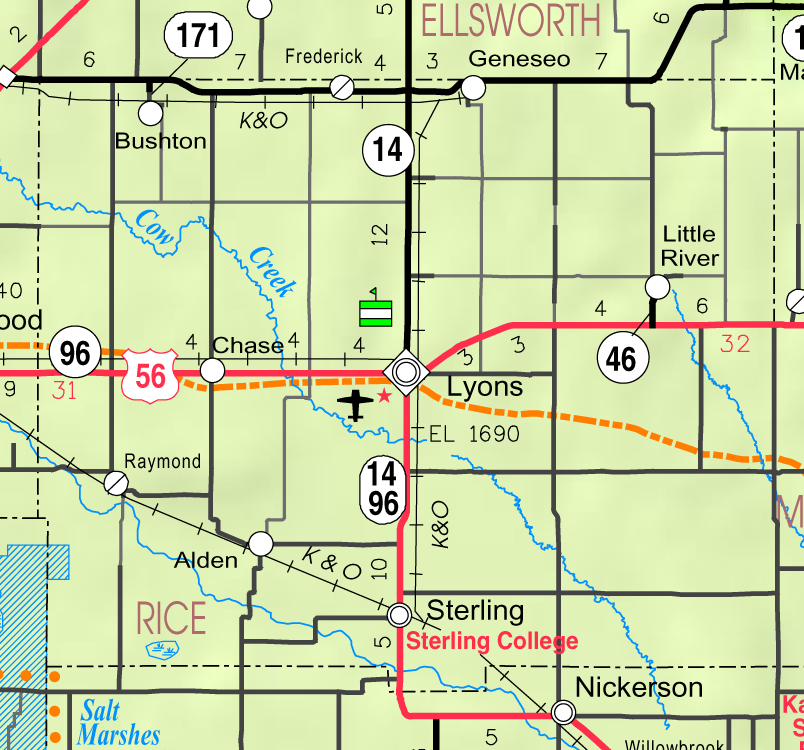
- KDOT map of Rice County (legend)
- Coordinates: 38°21′19″N 98°20′55″W
- Country: United States
- State: Kansas
- County: Rice
- Township: Lincoln
- Founded: 1880
- Platted: 1880
- Incorporated: 1902

Area
  - Total: 0.28 sq mi (0.72 km^{2})
  - Land: 0.28 sq mi (0.72 km^{2})
  - Water: 0 sq mi (0.00 km^{2})
- Elevation: 1,719 ft (524 m)

Population (2020)
  - Total: 396
  - Density: 1,400/sq mi (550/km^{2})
- Time zone: UTC-6 (CST)
  - Summer (DST): UTC-5 (CDT)
- ZIP Code: 67524
- Area code: 620
- FIPS code: 20-12650
- GNIS ID: 2393808

Chase is a city in Rice County, Kansas, United States. As of the 2020 census, the population of the city was 396.

== History ==
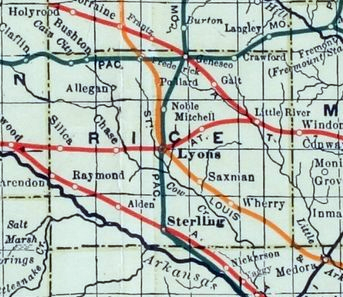
1915 railroad map of Rice County

For millennia, the land now known as Kansas was inhabited by Native Americans. In 1803, most of modern Kansas was secured by the United States as part of the Louisiana Purchase. In 1854, the Kansas Territory was organized, then in 1861 Kansas became the 34th U.S. state. In 1867, Rice County was founded.

In 1878, Atchison, Topeka and Santa Fe Railway and parties from Marion and McPherson counties chartered the Marion and McPherson Railway Company. In 1879, a branch line was built from Florence to McPherson; in 1880 it was extended to Lyons and in 1881 was extended to Ellinwood. The line was leased and operated by the Atchison, Topeka and Santa Fe Railway. The line from Florence to Marion was abandoned in 1968. In 1992, the line from Marion to McPherson was sold to Central Kansas Railway. In 1993, after heavy flood damage, the line from Marion to McPherson was abandoned. The original branch line connected Florence, Marion, Canada, Hillsboro, Lehigh, Canton, Galva, McPherson, Conway, Windom, Little River, Mitchell, Lyons, Chase and Ellinwood.

Chase was laid out in 1880 when the railroad was extended to that point. The city was named after a railroad official. The first post office in Chase was established in 1881.

== Geography ==
According to the United States Census Bureau, the city has a total area of 0.29 square miles (0.75 km^{2}), all land.

=== Climate ===
The climate in this area is characterized by hot, humid summers and generally mild to cool winters. According to the Köppen Climate Classification system, Chase has a humid subtropical climate, abbreviated "Cfa" on climate maps.

== Demographics ==
Historical population
Census	Pop.	Note	%±
1890	358		—
1910	263		—
1920	286		8.7%
1930	278		−2.8%
1940	825		196.8%
1950	961		16.5%
1960	922		−4.1%
1970	800		−13.2%
1980	753		−5.9%
1990	577		−23.4%
2000	490		−15.1%
2010	477		−2.7%
2020	396		−17.0%
U.S. Decennial Census

=== 2020 census ===
The 2020 United States census counted 396 people, 167 households, and 97 families in Chase. The population density was 1,424.5 per square mile (550.0/km^{2}). There were 201 housing units at an average density of 723.0 per square mile (279.2/km^{2}). The racial makeup was 83.08% (329) white or European American (79.04% non-Hispanic white), 0.51% (2) black or African-American, 0.51% (2) Native American or Alaska Native, 0.0% (0) Asian, 0.0% (0) Pacific Islander or Native Hawaiian, 6.82% (27) from other races, and 9.09% (36) from two or more races. Hispanic or Latino of any race was 12.63% (50) of the population.

Of the 167 households, 29.3% had children under the age of 18; 37.1% were married couples living together; 26.3% had a female householder with no spouse or partner present. 36.5% of households consisted of individuals and 19.8% had someone living alone who was 65 years of age or older. The average household size was 2.3 and the average family size was 3.0. The percent of those with a bachelor's degree or higher was estimated to be 6.3% of the population.

26.3% of the population was under the age of 18, 7.6% from 18 to 24, 19.7% from 25 to 44, 26.0% from 45 to 64, and 20.5% who were 65 years of age or older. The median age was 41.8 years. For every 100 females, there were 91.3 males. For every 100 females ages 18 and older, there were 94.7 males.

The 2016–2020 5-year American Community Survey estimates show that the median household income was $47,292 (with a margin of error of +/- $7,958) and the median family income was $49,875 (+/- $26,290). Males had a median income of $38,889 (+/- $9,371) versus $10,625 (+/- $7,390) for females. The median income for those above 16 years old was $27,019 (+/- $9,504). Approximately, 27.2% of families and 32.6% of the population were below the poverty line, including 61.5% of those under the age of 18 and 13.6% of those ages 65 or over.

=== 2010 census ===
As of the census of 2010, there were 477 people, 196 households, and 133 families residing in the city. The population density was 1,644.8 inhabitants per square mile (635.1/km^{2}). There were 225 housing units at an average density of 775.9 per square mile (299.6/km^{2}). The racial makeup of the city was 94.8% White, 0.4% African American, 0.6% Asian, 0.6% from other races, and 3.6% from two or more races. Hispanic or Latino of any race were 7.8% of the population.

There were 196 households, of which 33.2% had children under the age of 18 living with them, 46.9% were married couples living together, 11.2% had a female householder with no husband present, 9.7% had a male householder with no wife present, and 32.1% were non-families. 27.6% of all households were made up of individuals, and 16.3% had someone living alone who was 65 years of age or older. The average household size was 2.43 and the average family size was 2.89.

The median age in the city was 38.4 years. 27.5% of residents were under the age of 18; 9% were between the ages of 18 and 24; 21% were from 25 to 44; 24.9% were from 45 to 64; and 17.6% were 65 years of age or older. The gender makeup of the city was 50.5% male and 49.5% female.

== Education ==
The community is served by Chase–Raymond USD 401 public school district.

== See also ==
- National Register of Historic Places listings in Rice County, Kansas
- Santa Fe Trail
