= Windom, Kansas =

City in McPherson County, Kansas

- City
- Windom in the early 20th century

- Location within McPherson County and Kansas

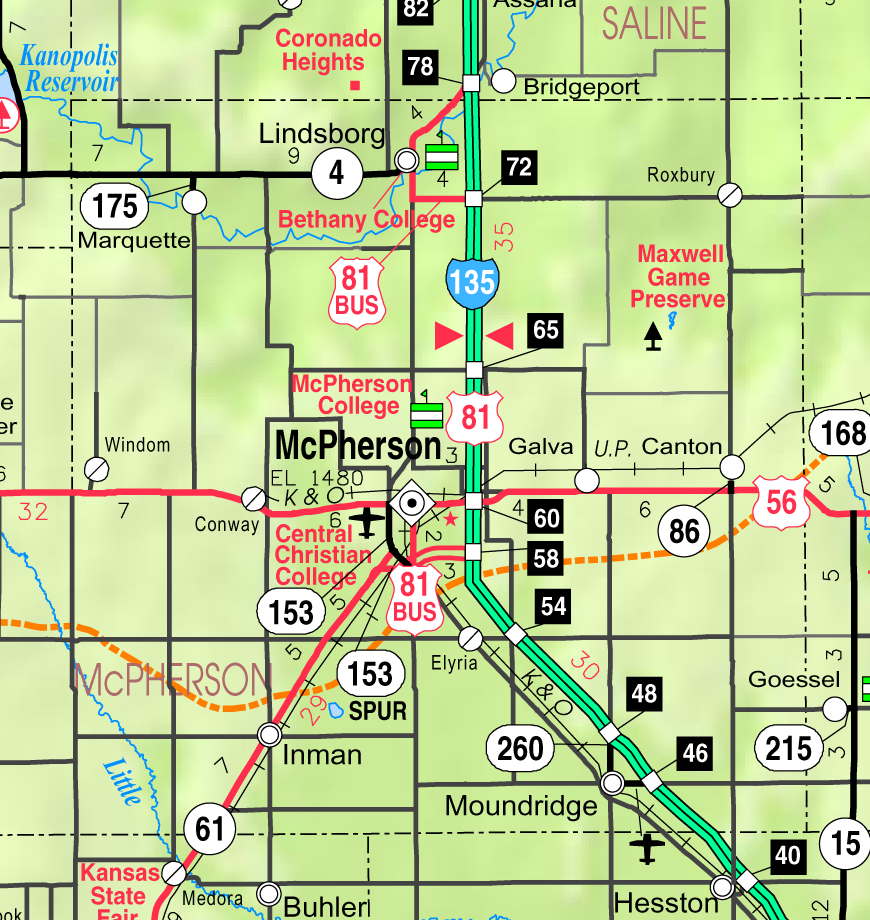
- KDOT map of McPherson County (legend)
- Coordinates: 38°23′03″N 97°54′37″W
- Country: United States
- State: Kansas
- County: McPherson
- Incorporated: 1885

Area
  - Total: 0.20 sq mi (0.52 km^{2})
  - Land: 0.20 sq mi (0.52 km^{2})
  - Water: 0 sq mi (0.00 km^{2})
- Elevation: 1,650 ft (500 m)

Population (2020)
  - Total: 85
  - Density: 420/sq mi (160/km^{2})
- Time zone: UTC-6 (CST)
  - Summer (DST): UTC-5 (CDT)
- ZIP Code: 67491
- Area code: 620
- FIPS code: 20-79850
- GNIS ID: 2397340
- Website: City website

Windom is a city in McPherson County, Kansas, United States. As of the 2020 census, the population of the city was 85.

== History ==
=== 19th century ===
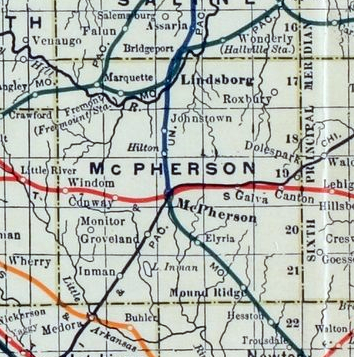
1915 railroad map of McPherson County

For millennia, the land now known as Kansas was inhabited by Native Americans. In 1803, most of modern Kansas was secured by the United States as part of the Louisiana Purchase. In 1854, the Kansas Territory was organized, then in 1861 Kansas became the 34th U.S. state. In 1867, McPherson County was founded.

In 1878, Atchison, Topeka and Santa Fe Railway and parties from Marion and McPherson counties chartered the Marion and McPherson Railway Company. In 1879, a branch line was built from Florence to McPherson; in 1880 it was extended to Lyons and in 1881 was extended to Ellinwood. The line was leased and operated by the Atchison, Topeka and Santa Fe Railway. The line from Florence to Marion, was abandoned in 1968. In 1992, the line from Marion to McPherson was sold to Central Kansas Railway. In 1993, after heavy flood damage, the line from Marion to McPherson was abandoned. The original branch line connected Florence, Marion, Canada, Hillsboro, Lehigh, Canton, Galva, McPherson, Conway, Windom, Little River, Mitchell, Lyons, Chase and Ellinwood.

Some hold that Windom was named in honor of William Windom, while others believe its namesake is Windham County, Connecticut.

=== 20th century ===
The National Old Trails Road, also known as the Ocean-to-Ocean Highway, was established in 1912, and was routed through Windom, Conway and McPherson.

== Geography ==
According to the United States Census Bureau, the city has a total area of 0.25 square miles (0.65 km^{2}), all land.

=== Climate ===
The climate in this area is characterized by hot, humid summers and generally mild to cool winters. According to the Köppen Climate Classification system, Windom has a humid subtropical climate, abbreviated "Cfa" on climate maps.

== Demographics ==
Historical population
Census	Pop.	Note	%±
1890	165		—
1900	146		−11.5%
1910	176		20.5%
1920	248		40.9%
1930	197		−20.6%
1940	196		−0.5%
1950	193		−1.5%
1960	168		−13.0%
1970	183		8.9%
1980	160		−12.6%
1990	136		−15.0%
2000	137		0.7%
2010	130		−5.1%
2020	85		−34.6%
U.S. Decennial Census

=== 2010 census ===
As of the census of 2010, there were 130 people, 53 households, and 28 families residing in the city. The population density was 520.0 inhabitants per square mile (200.8/km^{2}). There were 65 housing units at an average density of 260.0 per square mile (100.4/km^{2}). The racial makeup of the city was 91.5% White, 0.8% African American, 0.8% Asian, 4.6% from other races, and 2.3% from two or more races. Hispanic or Latino of any race were 6.2% of the population.

There were 53 households, of which 30.2% had children under the age of 18 living with them, 39.6% were married couples living together, 5.7% had a female householder with no husband present, 7.5% had a male householder with no wife present, and 47.2% were non-families. 41.5% of all households were made up of individuals, and 18.8% had someone living alone who was 65 years of age or older. The average household size was 2.45 and the average family size was 3.57.

The median age in the city was 41 years. 30% of residents were under the age of 18; 6.1% were between the ages of 18 and 24; 22.2% were from 25 to 44; 23.8% were from 45 to 64; and 17.7% were 65 years of age or older. The gender makeup of the city was 49.2% male and 50.8% female.

=== 2000 census ===
As of the census of 2000, there were 137 people, 62 households, and 39 families residing in the city. The population density was 220.4/km^{2} (562.8/sq. mi.). There were 74 housing units at an average density of 119.0/km^{2} (304.0/sq. mi.). The racial makeup of the city was 95.62% White, 1.46% from other races, and 2.92% from two or more races.

There were 62 households, out of which 21.0% had children under the age of 18 living with them, 56.5% were married couples living together, 3.2% had a female householder with no husband present, and 35.5% were non-families. 32.3% of all households were made up of individuals, and 14.5% had someone living alone who was 65 years of age or older. The average household size was 2.21 and the average family size was 2.78.

In the city, the population was spread out, with 21.9% under the age of 18, 5.8% from 18 to 24, 25.5% from 25 to 44, 27.7% from 45 to 64, and 19.0% who were 65 years of age or older. The median age was 42 years. For every 100 females, there were 85.1 males. For every 100 females age 18 and over, there were 98.1 males.

The median income for a household in the city was US$35,833, and the median income for a family was $38,125. Males had a median income of $31,875 versus $18,750 for females. The per capita income for the city was $17,240. There were 7.1% of families and 11.1% of the population living below the poverty line, including 19.4% of under eighteens and none of those over 64.

== Education ==
The community is served by Little River–Windom USD 444 public school district and Little River High School.

The Little River Redskins won the Kansas State High School 1A football championship in 1981.

Windom High School was closed through school unification. The Windom High School mascot was Windom Tigers.

== See also ==
- List of people from McPherson County, Kansas
- National Register of Historic Places listings in McPherson County, Kansas
