= Geneseo, Kansas =

City in Rice County, Kansas

- City
- Location within Rice County and Kansas

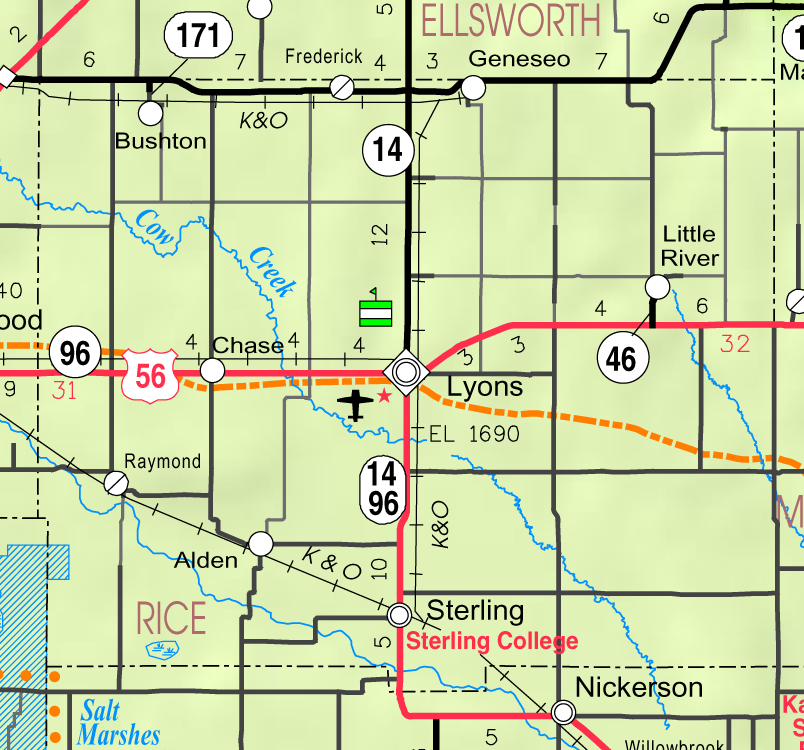
- KDOT map of Rice County (legend)
- Coordinates: 38°31′01″N 98°09′16″W
- Country: United States
- State: Kansas
- County: Rice
- Township: Victoria
- Founded: 1886
- Incorporated: 1887
- Named for: Geneseo, Illinois

Area
  - Total: 0.58 sq mi (1.51 km^{2})
  - Land: 0.58 sq mi (1.51 km^{2})
  - Water: 0 sq mi (0.00 km^{2})
- Elevation: 1,752 ft (534 m)

Population (2020)
  - Total: 236
  - Density: 405/sq mi (156/km^{2})
- Time zone: UTC-6 (CST)
  - Summer (DST): UTC-5 (CDT)
- ZIP Code: 67444
- Area code: 620
- FIPS code: 20-26075
- GNIS ID: 2394873

Geneseo is a city in Rice County, Kansas, United States. As of the 2020 census, the population of the city was 236.

== History ==
For millennia, the land now known as Kansas was inhabited by Native Americans. In 1803, most of modern Kansas was secured by the United States as part of the Louisiana Purchase. In 1854, the Kansas Territory was organized; then, in 1861, Kansas became the 34th U.S. state. In 1867, Rice County was founded.

Geneseo was founded in 1886. It was named after Geneseo, Illinois.

In 2022, Geneseo was named the UFO capital of Kansas. The Geneseo City Museum highlights local history and writings on extraterrestrials.

== Geography ==
According to the United States Census Bureau, the city has a total area of 0.58 square miles (1.50 km^{2}), all land.

=== Climate ===
The climate in this area is characterized by hot, humid summers and generally mild to cool winters. According to the Köppen Climate Classification system, Geneseo has a humid subtropical climate, abbreviated "Cfa" on climate maps.

== Demographics ==
Historical population
Census	Pop.	Note	%±
1890	399		—
1900	466		16.8%
1910	566		21.5%
1920	561		−0.9%
1930	536		−4.5%
1940	632		17.9%
1950	660		4.4%
1960	558		−15.5%
1970	453		−18.8%
1980	496		9.5%
1990	382		−23.0%
2000	272		−28.8%
2010	267		−1.8%
2020	236		−11.6%
U.S. Decennial Census

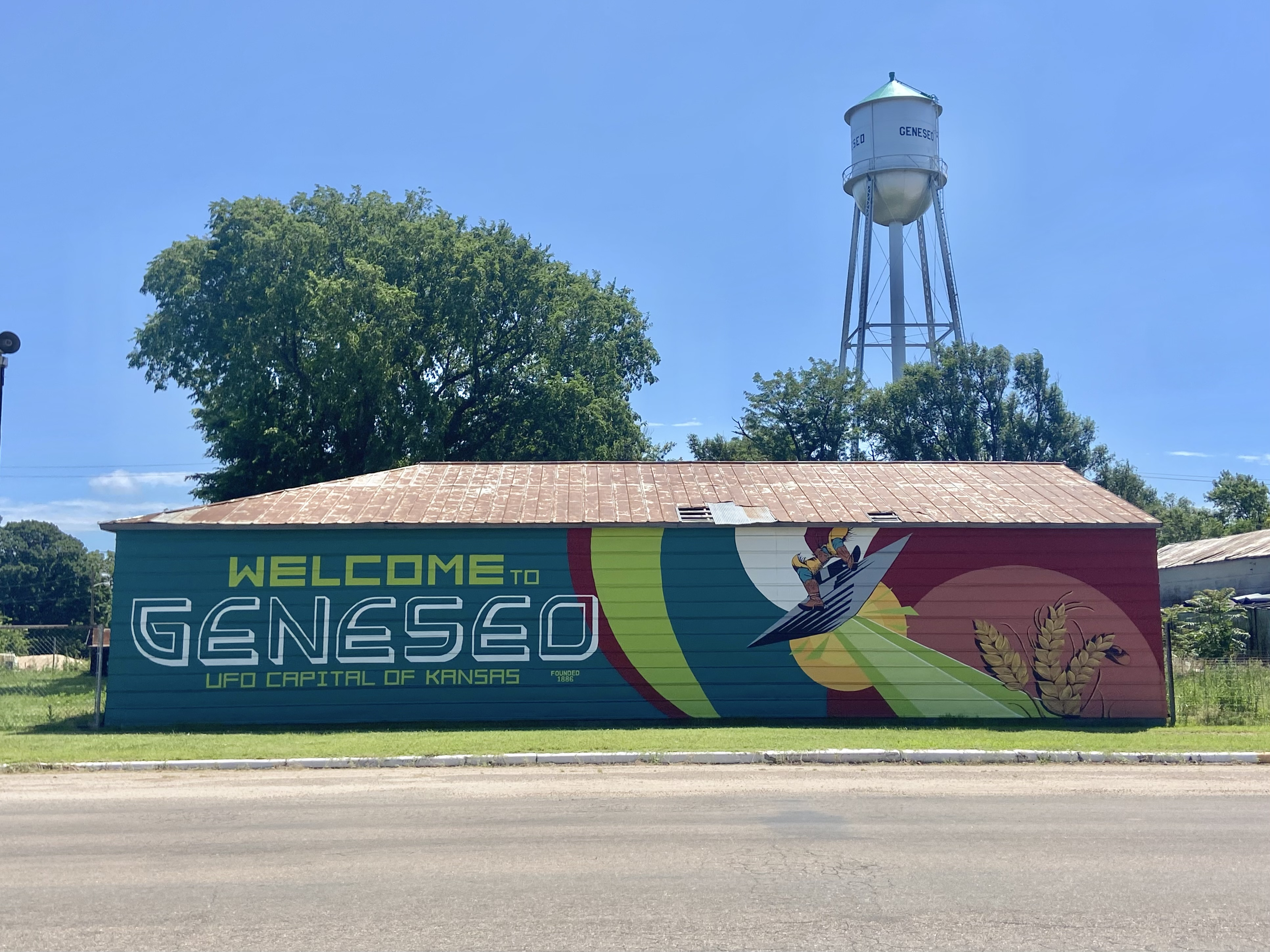
Mural showcasing Geneseo's status as UFO capital of Kansas as part of the Engaging Placemaking for Innovative Communities project in Rice County

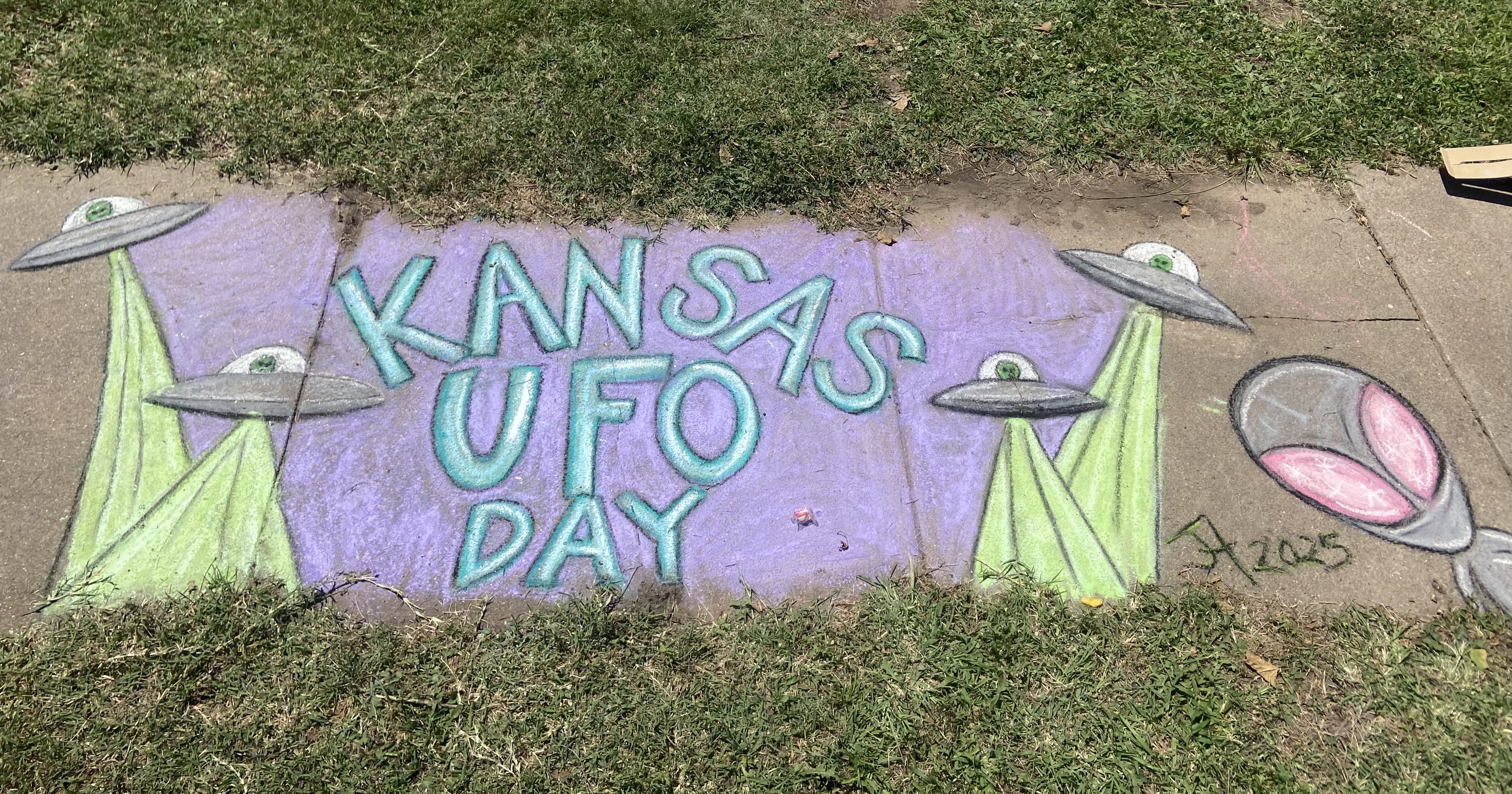
Chalk art celebrating UFO Day in Geneseo

=== 2020 census ===
The 2020 United States census counted 236 people, 119 households, and 60 families in Geneseo. The population density was 402.7 per square mile (155.5/km^{2}). There were 135 housing units at an average density of 230.4 per square mile (88.9/km^{2}). The racial makeup was 88.56% (209) white or European American (86.02% non-Hispanic white), 1.27% (3) black or African-American, 0.42% (1) Native American or Alaska Native, 0.0% (0) Asian, 0.0% (0) Pacific Islander or Native Hawaiian, 0.42% (1) from other races, and 9.32% (22) from two or more races. Hispanic or Latino of any race was 4.66% (11) of the population.

Of the 119 households, 24.4% had children under the age of 18; 40.3% were married couples living together; 21.8% had a female householder with no spouse or partner present. 42.0% of households consisted of individuals and 19.3% had someone living alone who was 65 years of age or older. The average household size was 2.0 and the average family size was 2.9. The percent of those with a bachelor's degree or higher was estimated to be 7.2% of the population.

17.4% of the population was under the age of 18, 3.8% from 18 to 24, 22.0% from 25 to 44, 25.8% from 45 to 64, and 30.9% who were 65 years of age or older. The median age was 53.8 years. For every 100 females, there were 85.8 males. For every 100 females ages 18 and older, there were 91.2 males.

The 2016–2020 5-year American Community Survey estimates show that the median household income was $30,750 (with a margin of error of +/- $7,296) and the median family income was $31,806 (+/- $24,552). Males had a median income of $40,859 (+/- $11,222) versus $27,625 (+/- $23,826) for females. The median income for those above 16 years old was $30,000 (+/- $12,471). Approximately, 8.2% of families and 8.9% of the population were below the poverty line, including 4.9% of those under the age of 18 and 13.8% of those ages 65 or over.

=== 2010 census ===
As of the census of 2010, there were 267 people, 129 households, and 73 families residing in the city. The population density was 460.3 inhabitants per square mile (177.7/km^{2}). There were 169 housing units at an average density of 291.4 per square mile (112.5/km^{2}). The racial makeup of the city was 95.9% White, 0.7% from other races, and 3.4% from two or more races. Hispanic or Latino of any race were 4.1% of the population.

There were 129 households, of which 16.3% had children under the age of 18 living with them, 42.6% were married couples living together, 8.5% had a female householder with no husband present, 5.4% had a male householder with no wife present, and 43.4% were non-families. 39.5% of all households were made up of individuals, and 13.9% had someone living alone who was 65 years of age or older. The average household size was 2.07 and the average family size was 2.70.

The median age in the city was 52.8 years. 17.6% of residents were under the age of 18; 4.6% were between the ages of 18 and 24; 16.8% were from 25 to 44; 39.7% were from 45 to 64; and 21.3% were 65 years of age or older. The gender makeup of the city was 57.3% male and 42.7% female.

== Education ==
The community is served by Ellsworth USD 327 public school district. The district high school is located in Ellsworth. The Ellsworth High School mascot is Ellsworth Bearcats.

Geneseo High School was closed through school unification in 1980. The Geneseo High School mascot was Geneseo Dragons.

== Media ==
Newspaper

The Geneseo Journal was originally called the Geneseo Herald from 1887 to 1899, then it became Geneseo Post from 1908 to 1909. From 1979 through 1983 it was known as Geneseo Galaxy.

== Transportation ==
Geneseo was founded after two competing railroads vied for access to cross tracks at that point. In November 0f 1886, the Santa Fe Railway built northwesterly from Little River toward Holyrood. The Missouri Pacific was building west from Kansas City to Pueblo, Colorado. The town of Geneseo was founded just west of the intersection of the two railroads. A line from Hutchinson and later Wichita was added connecting to the main line at the west edge of Geneseo running south and another line was added on the east side of Geneseo running north to connect with the Union Pacific at Kanopolis, Kansas, making Geneseo a hub for transportation activity. The Colorado Eagle became the Missouri Pacific's flagship line for modern passenger service.

The Atchison, Topeka and Santa Fe Railway formerly provided mixed train service to Geneseo on a line between Little River and Galatia until at least 1961.

== Notable people ==
- John S. Gibson, Jr., one of the youngest mayors of the United States, who later moved to California and became a member of the Los Angeles City Council

== See also ==
- National Register of Historic Places listings in Rice County, Kansas
