= K-256 (Kansas highway) =

State highway in Kansas, U.S.

K-256
- K-256 highlighted in red

Route information
- Maintained by KDOT and the city of Marion
- Length: 4.989 mi (8.029 km)
- Existed: November 8, 1985–present

Major junctions
- West end: US-56 northwest of Marion
- East end: US-77 east of Marion

Location
- Country: United States
- State: Kansas

Highway system
- Kansas State Highway System; Interstate; US; State; Spurs
← K-255	→ K-257

K-256 is an approximately 5-mile-long (8.0 km) east–west state highway in the U.S. state of Kansas. The highways western terminus is at U.S. Route 56 (US-56) northwest of Marion and the eastern terminus is at US-77 east of Marion. K-256 directly serves the city of Marion, the county seat of Marion County. The highway is a two-lane road its entire length. The section of K-256 within the city of Marion is maintained by the city.

Before state highways were numbered in Kansas, there were auto trails. The east–west section from the center of Marion westward follows the former National Old Trails Road, Old Santa Fe Trail, and Southwest Trail. K-256 intersects the former Kansas–Oklahoma–Texas Highway in Marion. On June 24, 1984, the Kansas Department of Transportation (KDOT) announced that construction would begin in June 1986, on a new alignment of US-56 north of the city of Marion. The Kansas Department of Transportation authorized the addition of K-256 to the state highway system in a November 8, 1985 resolution. In 2013, KDOT proposed transferring the maintenance of K-256 to Marion County, and to remove it from the state highway system.

== Route description ==
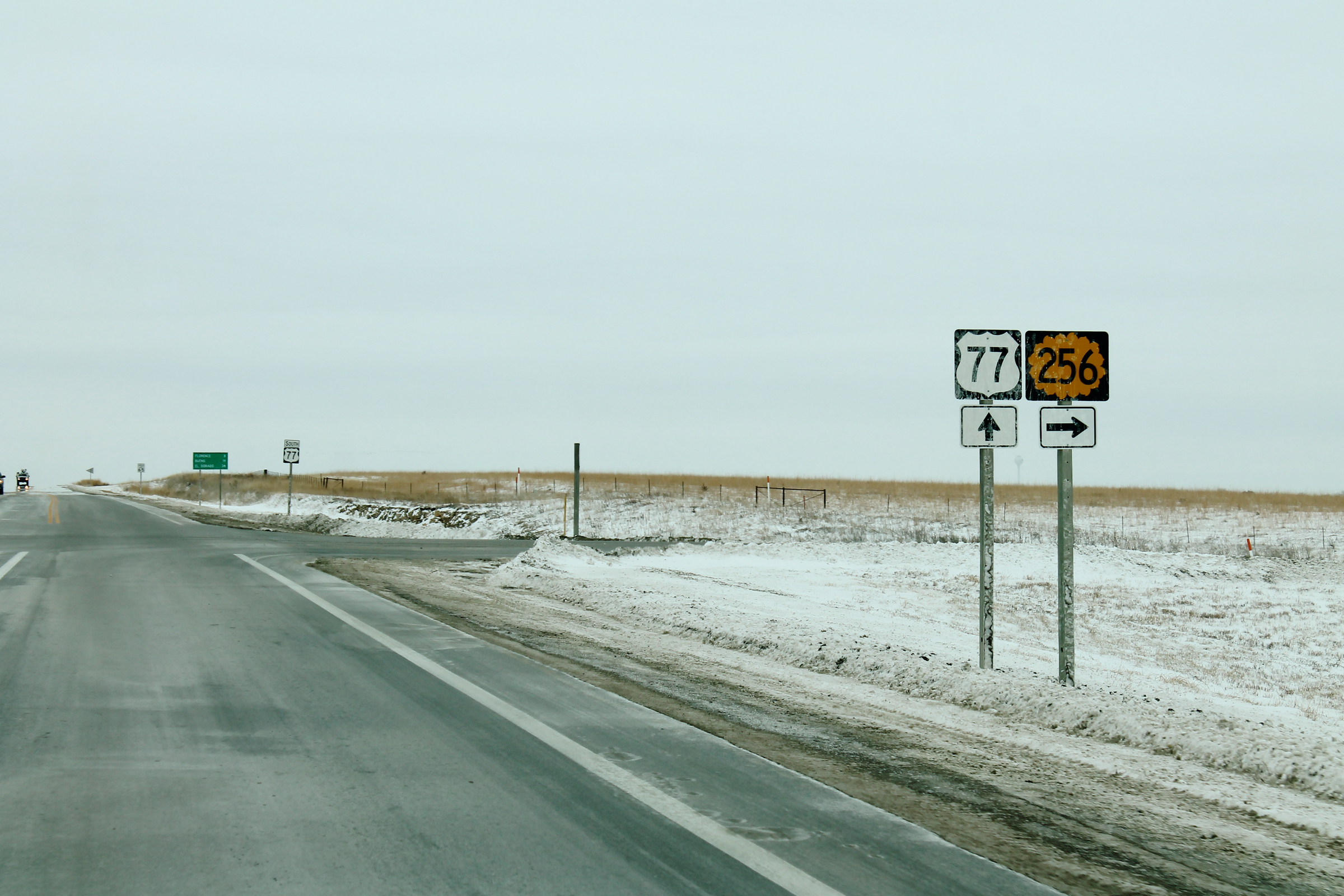
K-256's northern terminus

K-256's western terminus is at US-56 northwest of Marion. The highway heads south through farmlands and after about 0.65 miles (1.05 km) crosses the Cottonwood River. K-256 continues for roughly 0.3 miles (0.48 km) then turns east onto 190th Street. The highway advances east for 0.4 miles (0.64 km) and crosses the Cottonwood River again as it enters the city of Marion. The highway continues along Main Street and enters the downtown area after its at-grade crossing of a Union Pacific Railroad track. K-256 passes through a commercial area for about 0.4 miles (0.64 km) then crosses Mud Creek. The highway shifts slightly north as it passes the historic Hill Grade School. K-256 passes Marion High School then shifts south through a reverse curve at Cedar Street. The highway continues east for about 0.5 miles (0.80 km) then exits the city. The roadway advances east through rural farmland for 0.95 miles (1.53 km) and intersects Upland Road, which travels south to Marion Municipal Airport and the Civilian Conservation Corps–constructed Marion County Lake. K-256 continues for one mile (1.6 km) before reaching its eastern terminus at US-77 east of Marion and one mile (1.6 km) south of the US-56–US-77–K-150 roundabout.

The Kansas Department of Transportation (KDOT) tracks the traffic levels on its highways, and in 2019, they determined that on average the traffic varied from 535 vehicles per day near the western terminus to 1,570 vehicles per day slightly west of Marion. K-256 is not included in the National Highway System, which is a system of highways important to the nation's defense, economy, and mobility. K-256 does connect to the National Highway System at its eastern terminus. The entire 1.645-mile-long (2.647 km) section of K-256 in Marion is maintained by the city.

== History ==
=== Early roads ===
Prior to the formation of the Kansas state highway system, there were auto trails, which were an informal network of marked routes that existed in the United States and Canada in the early part of the 20th century. The east–west section from the center of Marion westward follows the former National Old Trails Road, which ran from Baltimore, Maryland to California; Old Santa Fe Trail; and Southwest Trail, which ran from Chicago, Illinois to El Paso, Texas. K-256 intersects the former Kansas–Oklahoma–Texas Highway in Marion. Until 1950, US-77 entered Marion from the south then followed what is now K-256 east out of the city.

=== Establishment ===
Northwest of Hillsboro, US-56 originally turned south briefly then back east and passed through Hillsboro and Marion and then met its modern day alignment. In a March 30, 1981 resolution, it was approved to move US-56 slightly north to a new alignment, which would bypass Hillsboro and Marion. On June 24, 1984, KDOT announced that construction should begin in June 1986. The state had conducted studies for the reroute in 1953, 1966, 1971, 1974, and 1975, but each time it was shut down by opposition from businesses in Marion. In September 1986, when construction on the bypass got near Marion, an archeological survey was performed on a previously known Indian site. The survey showed the site to be much larger than previously thought and found artifacts from Wichita people. Construction on that section was postponed for a month due to the findings. The new $12.6 million (equivalent to $34.3 million in 2025) section of US-56 was opened by mid-1988.

The Kansas Department of Transportation authorized the addition of K-256 to the state highway system through a November 8, 1985 resolution, to the former section of US-56 through Marion to US-77. K-256 first appeared on the 1991-92 KDOT state highway map. In 2013, KDOT proposed transferring the maintenance of K-256 to Marion County, and remove it from the state highway system.

== Major intersections ==
The entire route is in Marion County.

Location	mi	km	Destinations	Notes
Centre Township	0.000	0.000	Remington Road – Pilsen	Continuation beyond US-56
Centre Township	0.000	0.000	US-56 – McPherson, Herington	Western terminus
Centre Township	4.989	8.029	US-77 – El Dorado, Herington	Eastern terminus
1.000 mi = 1.609 km; 1.000 km = 0.621 mi
