= Marion Municipal Airport =

Marion Municipal Airport may refer to:

- Marion Municipal Airport (Indiana) in Marion, Indiana, United States (IATA/FAA: MZZ)
- Marion Municipal Airport (Kansas) in Marion, Kansas, United States (FAA: 43K)
- Marion Municipal Airport (Ohio) in Marion, Ohio, United States (IATA/FAA: MNN)
