= Centre Township, Kansas =

Centre Township Marion County, Kansas
- Township
- Location within Marion County

- Location within the state of Kansas
- Coordinates: 38.3513486°N 96.9881309°W
- Country: United States
- State: Kansas
- County: Marion

Area
  - Total: 52 sq mi (130 km^{2})

Dimensions
  - Length: 10.0 mi (16.1 km)
  - Width: 7.0 mi (11.3 km)
- Elevation: 1,375 ft (419 m)

Population (2020)
  - Total: 469
  - Density: 9.0/sq mi (3.5/km^{2})
- Time zone: UTC-6 (CST)
  - Summer (DST): UTC-5 (CDT)
- Area code: 620
- FIPS code: 20-12437
- GNIS ID: 477247
- Website: County website

Centre Township is a township in Marion County, Kansas, United States. As of the 2020 census, the township population was 469, not including the city of Marion.

== Geography ==
Centre Township covers an area of 52 square miles (134.7 km^{2}). The Marion County Lake is located in the township.

== Communities ==
The township contains the following settlements:

- City of Marion.
- Unincorporated community of Marion County Lake.

== Cemeteries ==
The township contains the following cemeteries:

- Harter Cemetery, located in Section 26 T19S R4E.
- Highland Cemetery (aka Marion City Cemetery), located in Section 32 T20S R4E.

== Transportation ==
U.S. routes 56 and 77 pass through the township. K-256 and K-150 state highways connect in the township.
