= Eastshore =

Eastshore may refer to:

== Places ==
United States

- Eastshore State Park, in California
- Eastshore, Kansas, an unincorporated community

== Other ==
- East Shore and Suburban Railway
- Eastshore Freeway
