= Eastshore, Kansas =

Unincorporated community in Marion County, Kansas

- Unincorporated community and CDP
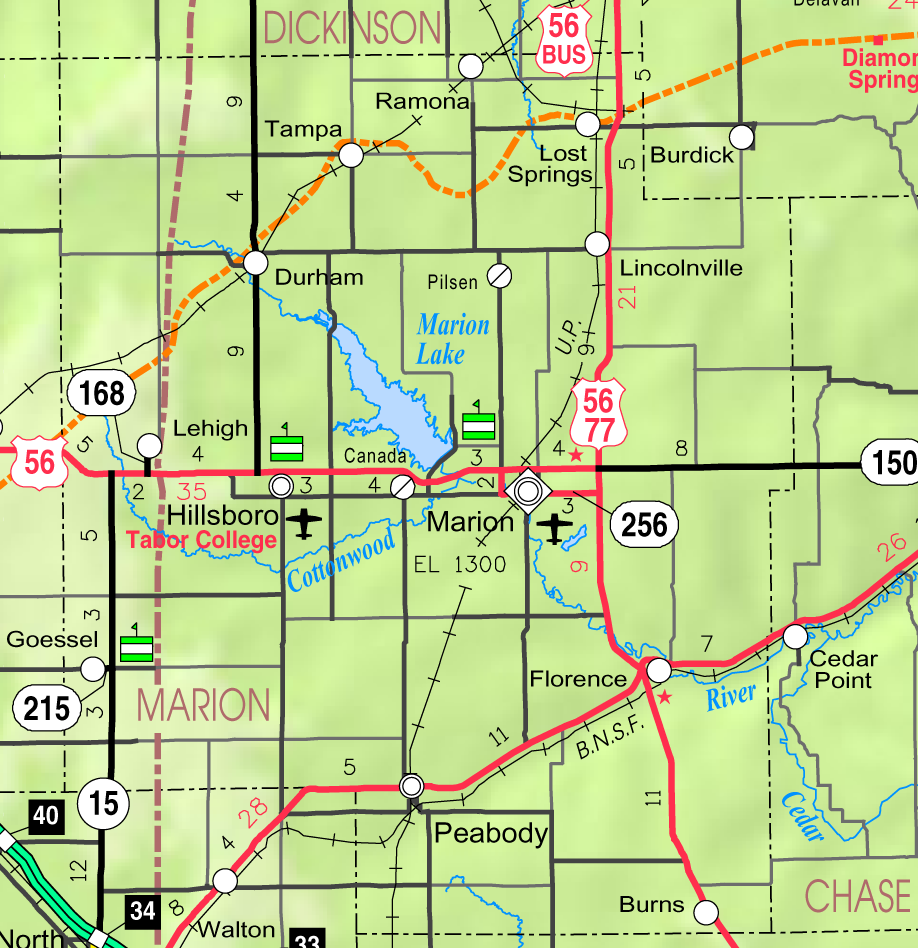
- KDOT map of Marion County (legend)

- Location within Kansas Location within the United States
- Coordinates: 38°22′55″N 97°04′26″W
- Country: United States
- State: Kansas
- County: Marion
- Township: Gale
- Founded: 1969
- Platted: 1969
- Elevation: 1,381 ft (421 m)

Population (2020)
  - Total: 92
- Time zone: UTC-6 (CST)
  - Summer (DST): UTC-5 (CDT)
- Area code: 620
- FIPS code: 20-19700
- GNIS ID: 2804496

Eastshore is an unincorporated community and census-designated place (CDP) in Marion County, Kansas, United States. As of the 2020 census, the population of the community and nearby areas was 92. The community name is derived from its location near the east shore of the Marion Reservoir. It is located north of the intersection of Pawnee Road and 210th Street.

== History ==
=== Early history ===
For many millennia, the Great Plains of North America was inhabited by nomadic Native Americans. From the 16th century to 18th century, the Kingdom of France claimed ownership of large parts of North America. In 1762, after the French and Indian War, France secretly ceded New France to Spain, per the Treaty of Fontainebleau.

=== 19th century ===
In 1802, Spain returned most of the land to France. In 1803, most of the land for modern day Kansas was acquired by the United States from France as part of the 828,000 square mile Louisiana Purchase for 2.83 cents per acre.

In 1806, Zebulon Pike led the Pike Expedition westward from St Louis, Missouri, of which part of their journey followed the Cottonwood River through Marion County near the current cities of Florence, Marion, Durham, and the community of Eastshore.

In 1854, the Kansas Territory was organized, then in 1861 Kansas became the 34th U.S. state. In 1855, Marion County was established within the Kansas Territory, which included the land for modern day Eastshore.

=== 20th century ===
From 1964 to 1968, the Marion Reservoir was constructed. Eastshore was platted on October 13, 1969.

== Geography ==
Eastshore is located at coordinates 38.3819584, -97.0739122 in the scenic Flint Hills and Great Plains of the state of Kansas. It lies immediately east of the Marion Cove of the Marion Reservoir.

=== Climate ===
The climate in this area is characterized by hot, humid summers and generally mild to cool winters. According to the Köppen Climate Classification system, Eastshore has a humid subtropical climate, abbreviated "Cfa" on climate maps.

== Demographics ==
Historical population
Census	Pop.	Note	%±
2020	92		—
U.S. Decennial Census

For statistical purposes, the United States Census Bureau has defined this community and nearby area as a census-designated place (CDP).

The 2020 United States census counted 92 people, 50 households, and 41 families in Eastshore. The population density was 0.1 per square mile (0.0/km^{2}). There were 70 housing units at an average density of 0.1 per square mile (0.0/km^{2}). The racial makeup was 92.39% (85) white or European American (91.3% non-Hispanic white), 0.0% (0) black or African-American, 2.17% (2) Native American or Alaska Native, 2.17% (2) Asian, 1.09% (1) Pacific Islander or Native Hawaiian, 0.0% (0) from other races, and 2.17% (2) from two or more races. Hispanic or Latino people of any race were 4.35% (4) of the population.

Of the 50 households, 18.0% had children under the age of 18; 80.0% were married couples living together; 4.0% had a female householder with no spouse or partner present. 16.0% of households consisted of individuals and 6.0% had someone living alone who was 65 years of age or older. The average household size was 1.9 and the average family size was 1.9.

10.9% of the population was under the age of 18, 3.3% from 18 to 24, 13.0% from 25 to 44, 26.1% from 45 to 64, and 46.7% who were 65 years of age or older. The median age was 63.0 years. For every 100 females, there were 95.7 males. For every 100 females ages 18 and older, there were 105.0 males.

== Area attractions ==
- Marion Reservoir is immediately west of Eastshore. The Marion cove is immediately west of Eastshore. The Cottonwood Point cove is about 0.5 miles northwest of Eastshore. The ram is 0.1 miles southwest of Eastshore. There are additional coves on the west side of the Reservoir.

== Education ==
The community is served by Marion–Florence USD 408 public school district. All students attend schools in Marion.

- Marion High School, located in Marion.
- Marion Middle School, located in Marion.
- Marion Elementary School, located in Marion.

== Media ==
=== Print ===
- Marion County Record, newspaper from Marion.
- Hillsboro Free Press, free newspaper for greater Marion County area.

== Infrastructure ==
=== Transportation ===
U.S. Route 56 runs 1.33 miles (2.14 km) south of the community.

=== Utilities ===
- Internet
  - Wireless is provided by Pixius Communications.
  - Satellite is provided by HughesNet, StarBand, WildBlue.
- TV
  - Satellite is provided by DirecTV, Dish Network.
  - Terrestrial is provided by regional digital TV stations.
- Electricity
  - Community and rural areas are served by Flint Hills RECA.
- Water
  - Community and rural areas are served by Marion County RWD #2.
