= Marion High School (Kansas) =

Location
- 701 East Main Street; Marion, Kansas 66861; United States
- Coordinates: 38.3481°N 97.0146°W

Information
- School type: Public, High School
- School board: Board Website
- School district: Marion–Florence USD 408
- CEEB code: 171915
- Principal: Donald Raymer
- Teaching staff: 14.50 (FTE)
- Grades: 9 to 12
- Gender: coed
- Enrollment: 153 (2023–2024)
- Student to teacher ratio: 10.55
- Campus type: rural
- Colors: Red; Blue; White
- Athletics: Class 2A,
- Athletics conference: Heart of America
- Mascot: Warrior
- Rival: Hillsboro High School
- Communities served: Marion, Florence, Aulne, Canada, Eastshore, Marion County Lake
- Website: School website

Marion High School is a public secondary school in Marion, Kansas, United States. It is one of three schools operated by Marion–Florence USD 408 school district. It is the sole public high school for the communities of Marion, Florence, Aulne, Canada, Eastshore, Marion County Lake, and nearby rural areas of Marion County

== History ==
In 1963, the School Unification Act in Kansas caused the further consolidatation of thousands of tiny school districts into hundreds of larger Unified School Districts.

In 1971, High School students from Florence started attending Marion High School after the Florence High School was closed in the same year.

== Academics ==
The high school is a member of T.E.E.N., a shared video teaching network, started in 1993, between five area high schools. The high school has a library for student access.

== Extracurricular activities ==
=== Sports ===
The Marion High School mascot is a Warrior. All high school athletic and non-athletic competition is overseen by the Kansas State High School Activities Association. For 2010 and 2011 seasons, the football team competed in Class 3A. In 2024, the City of Marion and Unified School District 408 jointly built a gymnasium and indoor swimming pool. Located just south of Marion Elementary School, the pool is open year-round and the gym features a walking track above a sunken gymnasium floor. The bond issue that financed the project also built a new auditorium on the Marion High School campus.

== Notable people ==
- Randolph Carpenter, U.S. Representative from Kansas, U.S. Army World War I veteran
- William M. Runyan, preacher, songwriter who composed Great Is Thy Faithfulness

== See also ==
- List of high schools in Kansas
- List of unified school districts in Kansas
