= K256 =

K256 or K-256 may refer to:

- K-256 (Kansas highway), a state highway in Kansas
- K256AS, a relay transmitter
