= Marion Reservoir =

- Location within Kansas Location within the United States

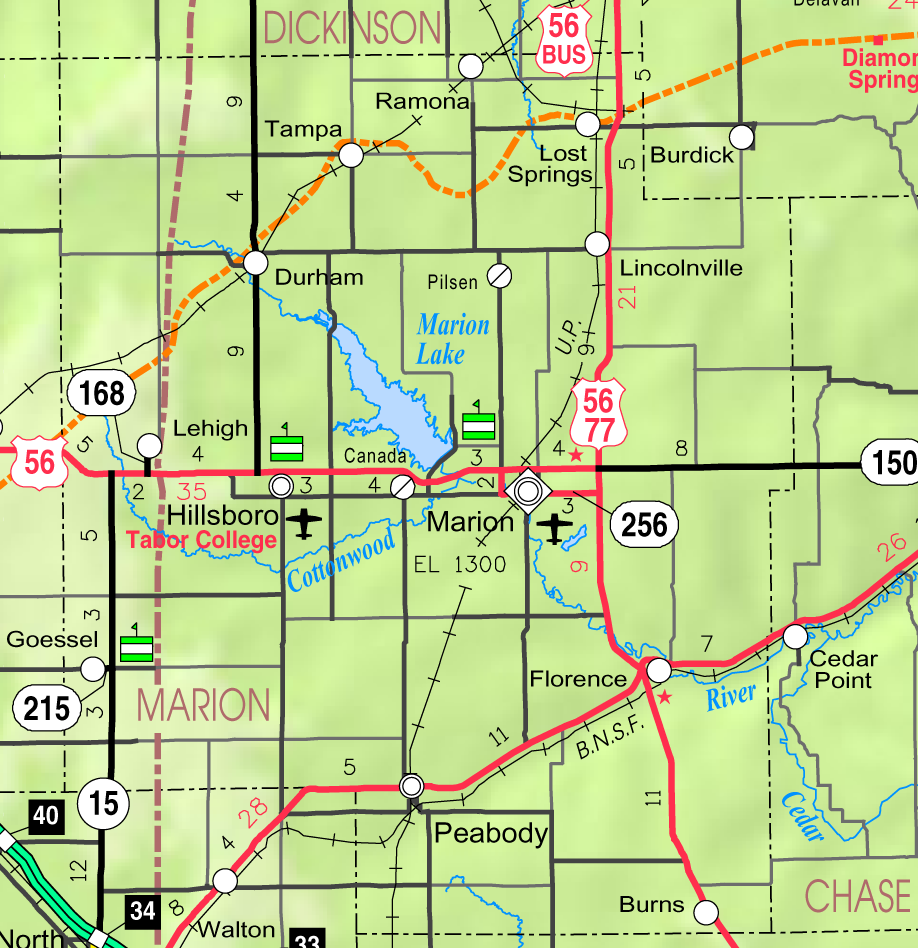
- KDOT map of Marion County (legend)
- Location: Marion County, Kansas
- Coordinates: 38°22′08″N 97°05′06″W
- Type: Reservoir
- Primary inflows: North Cottonwood River, French Creek
- Primary outflows: North Cottonwood River to Cottonwood River
- Catchment area: 200 square miles (520 km^{2})
- Basin countries: United States
- Managing agency: U.S. Army Corps of Engineers
- Built: February 1968
- Surface area: 6,160 acres (24.9 km^{2})
- Water volume: 67,734 acre⋅ft (83,549,000 m^{3})
- Shore length^{1}: 60 miles (97 km)
- Surface elevation: 1,348.79 feet (411.11 m)
- Settlements: Eastshore, Canada, Marion, Hillsboro, Durham
- ^{1} Shore length is not a well-defined measure.

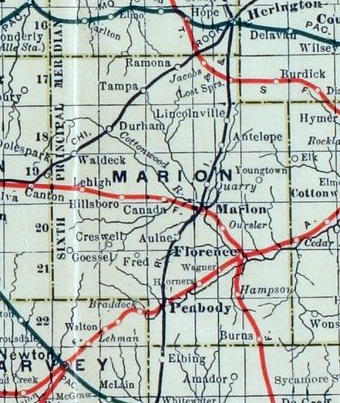
1915 Railroad Map of Marion County (about 50 years before the Marion Reservoir was built)

Marion Reservoir is a body of water on the Cottonwood River, 3 miles (4.8 km) north-west of Marion on the western edge of the Flint Hills region of Kansas in the United States. The reservoir was completed in 1968 for flood control and is operated by the Army Corps of Engineers.

It is also known by its older obsolete name Marion Lake and is not to be confused with the smaller Marion County Lake south-east of Marion. Most locals refer to the larger body of water using the term 'Reservoir', and the smaller body of water using the term 'Lake'.

== Geography ==
Marion Reservoir is located in Gale Township of Marion County, Kansas, United States. There are many entrances into the reservoir area. A two-lane paved road runs along the top length of the dam. The south edge of the dam is located approximately 1/2 mile north of U.S. Route 56 on Old Mill Road, where there is an information kiosk and public restrooms. The unincorporated community of Eastshore is located north-east of the dam. The closest cities are Marion (east of reservoir) and Hillsboro (west of reservoir).

== History ==
=== Early history ===
For many millennia, the Great Plains of North America was inhabited by nomadic Native Americans. From the 16th century to 18th century, the Kingdom of France claimed ownership of large parts of North America. In 1762, after the French and Indian War, France secretly ceded New France to Spain, per the Treaty of Fontainebleau.

=== 19th century ===
In 1802, Spain returned most of the land to France. In 1803, most of the land for modern day Kansas was acquired by the United States from France as part of the 828,000 square mile Louisiana Purchase for 2.83 cents per acre.

In 1806, Zebulon Pike led the Pike Expedition westward from St Louis, Missouri, of which part of their journey followed the Cottonwood River through Marion County including the land under the Reservoir.

In 1854, the Kansas Territory was organized, then in 1861 Kansas became the 34th U.S. state. In 1855, Marion County was established within the Kansas Territory, which included the land for modern day Reservoir.

=== 20th century ===
In June and July 1951, the "Great Flood of 1951" occurred with a peak discharge of 54,000 cu ft/s (1,500 m^{3}/s) and a volume of 78,950 acre-feet (97,380,000 m^{3}) which is equivalent to 7.40 inches (188 mm) of runoff from the drainage area above the dam site. The 1951 record flood in the region was one of the leading reasons for building the Marion Reservoir, and downstream levees in the cities of Marion and Florence.

In March 1964, construction was started on the Marion Reservoir, the embankment closure was completed in October 1967, and the project was placed in full flood control operation in February 1968.

=== 21st century ===
In 2011, the Cottonwood Point recreation area underwent a $7.9 million expansion to add more camp and day use sites by adding 61 new campsites, 23 new day-use sites, picnic shelters, and a new beach. Campsites boast shade, picnic areas, grills and two boat ramps between sites 62 and 67. Electrical pedestals are either 50/30/20 or 30/20 amp. The 20 amp outlets are standard USA 110 Volt wall outlets.

== Recreation areas ==
Camping and picnicking opportunities are numerous in four parks: Cottonwood Point, Hillsboro Cove, Marion Cove, French Creek Cove. Campsites contain picnic tables, grills and/or fire-rings, sun-shelters, and gravel parking pads. Facilities at class "A" parks (Cottonwood Point and Hillsboro Cove) include electrical hookups, showers, RV dump stations, group camping areas, group picnic areas, playgrounds, and beaches. Potable water is available in all parks.

Recreation areas around Marion Reservoir

- Cottonwood Point, Class A. North of US-56 on Pawnee Road (note: Old Mill Road over Dam merges with Pawnee).
- French Creek Cove, Class C. North of US-56 on Limestone Road.
- Hillsboro Cove, Class A. North of US-56 on Nighthawk Road.
- Marion Cove, Class C. North of US-56 on Pawnee Road (note: Old Mill Road over Dam merges with Pawnee).
- Durham Cove. 250th Street and Kansa Road. The undeveloped ramp is free.
- Broken Bridge. The undeveloped ramp is free.
- Overlook and Dam. North of US-56 on Old Mill Road.

== See also ==
- List of Kansas state parks
- List of lakes, reservoirs, and dams in Kansas
- List of rivers of Kansas
