= William M. Runyan =

American Christian composer (1870–1957)

- Born: William Marion Runyan; January 21, 1870; Marion, New York, US
- Died: July 29, 1957 (aged 87); Pittsburg, Kansas, US

William Marion Runyan (1870–1957) was a Christian composer from the United States who wrote the music to the well-known hymn Great Is Thy Faithfulness.

In 1870, William Marion Runyan was born in Marion, New York, to a Methodist minister Rev. William White Runyan (born 1828) and his wife Hannah (Orcutt) Runyan (born 1839). At age fourteen, Runyan and his family moved to Marion, Kansas. As a youth, Runyan served as a church organist and graduated from Marion High School in Kansas. Runyan was ordained as a Methodist minister at age twenty-one and then pastored various congregations in Kansas.

Runyan attended Northwestern University for three years from 1895 to 1898. Starting in 1915 Runyan began writing gospel songs with the encouragement of D.B. Towner of the Moody Bible Institute.

In 1923 Runyan moved from Wichita to Chicago. From 1924 to 1926 Runyan was affiliated with John Brown University in Siloam Springs, Arkansas, pastoring the Federated Church, and editing the Christian Workers' Magazine. Runyan then moved back to Chicago where he worked with the Moody Bible Institute, and he worked as editor for Hope Publishing Company, co-editing "The Service Hymnal" with Gordon Shorney.

In 1923 Runyan composed the music to the song "Great is Thy Faithfulness," originally a poem by Thomas O. Chisholm, a friend and a fellow Methodist minister. Runyan retired from Hope in 1948 and received the honorary Doctor of Letters from Wheaton College.

Runyan lived for a period of his retirement in Galveston, Texas, and died on July 29, 1957, in Pittsburg, Kansas. He is buried in Baldwin City, Kansas. Runyan was a professor and preacher at Baker University in Baldwin City for a period and his children attended the University. Runyan's survivors endowed "The Rev. William M. Runyan Endowed Memorial Scholarship" at Baker University with the royalties from his song "Great is Thy Faithfulness."
