= Marion, Kansas =

City in Marion County, Kansas

- City and County seat
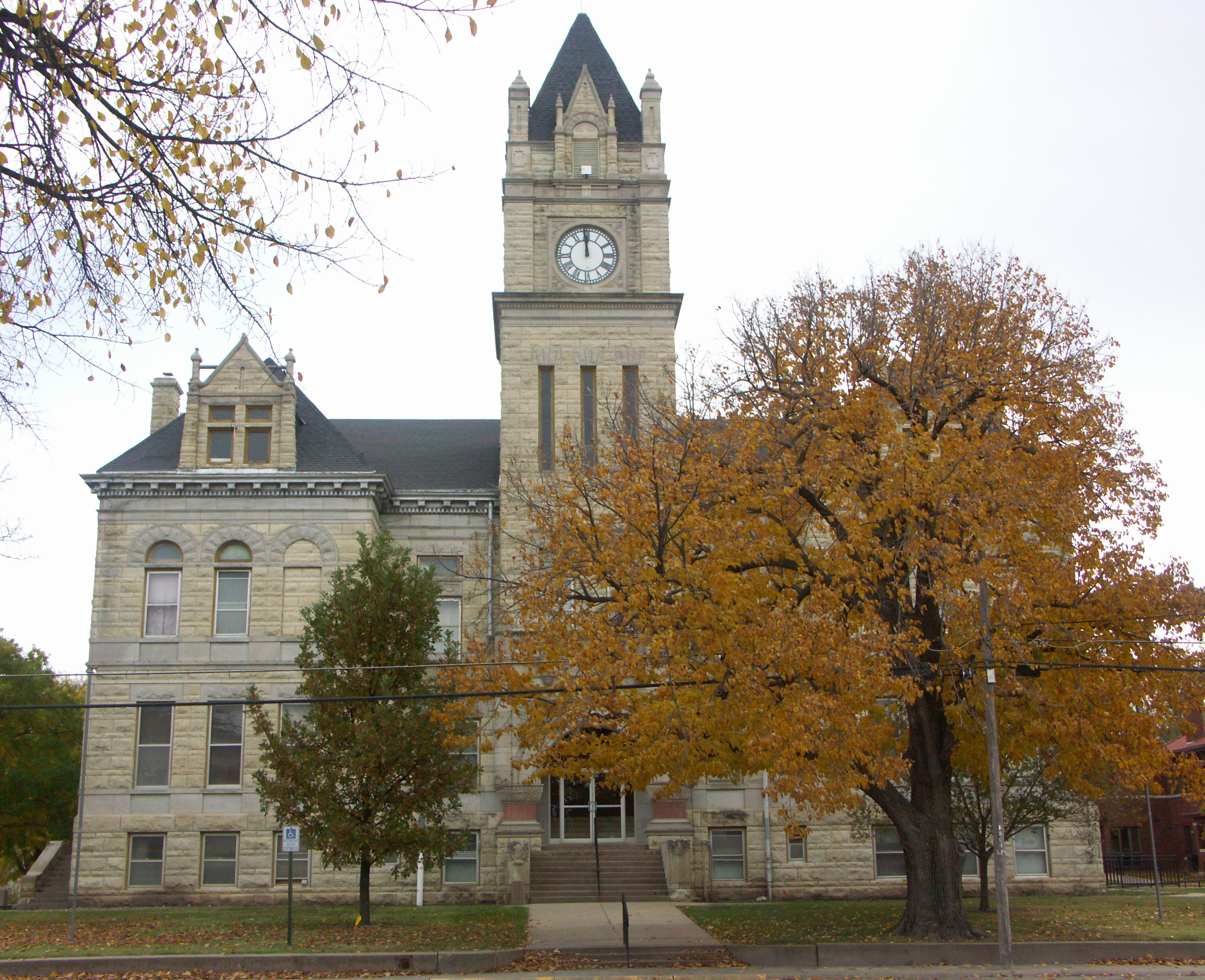
- Marion County Courthouse (2009)

- Location within Marion County and Kansas

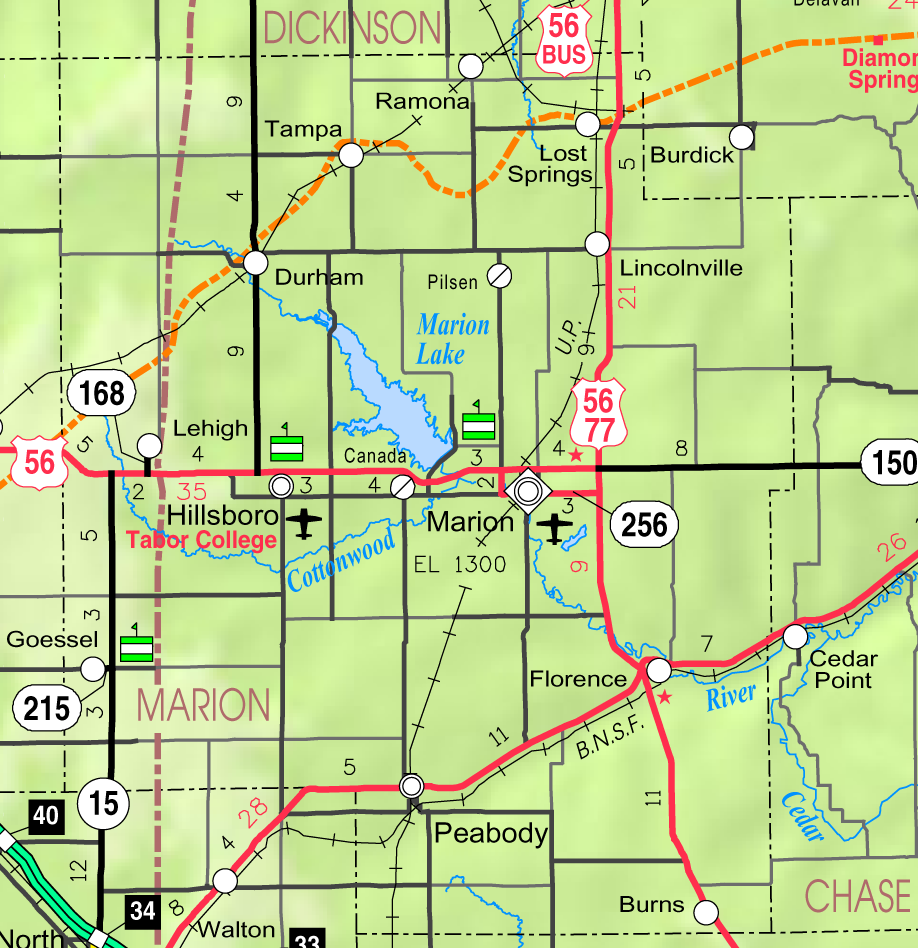
- KDOT map of Marion County (legend)
- Coordinates: 38°21′17″N 97°00′29″W
- Country: United States
- State: Kansas
- County: Marion
- Township: Centre
- Platted: 1866, 1871, 1873
- Incorporated: 1875
- Named for: Francis Marion

Government
  - Type: Mayor–Council
  - Mayor: Michael Powers

Area
  - Total: 2.69 sq mi (6.98 km^{2})
  - Land: 2.69 sq mi (6.96 km^{2})
  - Water: 0.0077 sq mi (0.02 km^{2})
- Elevation: 1,342 ft (409 m)

Population (2020)
  - Total: 1,922
  - Density: 715/sq mi (276/km^{2})
- Time zone: UTC-6 (CST)
  - Summer (DST): UTC-5 (CDT)
- ZIP Code: 66861
- Area code: 620
- FIPS code: 20-44750
- GNIS ID: 485619
- Website: marionks.net

Marion is a city in and the county seat of Marion County, Kansas, United States. As of the 2020 census, the population of the city was 1,922. The city was named in honor of Francis Marion, a brigadier general of the American Revolutionary War, known as the "Swamp Fox".

== History ==
=== Early history ===
For many millennia, the Great Plains of North America was inhabited by Native Americans. From the 16th century to 18th century, the Kingdom of France claimed ownership of large parts of North America. In 1762, after the French and Indian War, France secretly ceded New France to Spain, per the Treaty of Fontainebleau.

=== 19th century ===
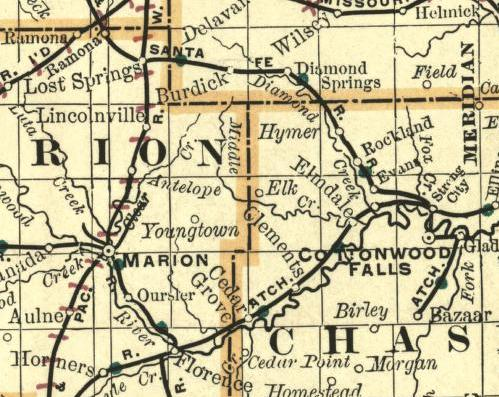
1893 railroad map

In 1802, Spain returned most of the land to France. In 1803, most of the land for modern day Kansas was acquired by the United States from France as part of the 828,000 square mile Louisiana Purchase for 2.83 cents per acre.

In 1806, Zebulon Pike led the Pike Expedition westward from St Louis, Missouri, of which part of their journey followed the Cottonwood River through Marion County near the current cities of Florence, Marion, Durham.

In 1854, the Kansas Territory was organized, then in 1861 Kansas became the 34th U.S. state. In 1855, Marion County was established within Kansas, which included the land for modern day Marion.

The city of Marion Centre was founded in 1860 and became the county seat, named in honor of Francis Marion. A post office was established on September 30, 1862, which shortened the name to Marion on October 15, 1881. The city officially adopted the shorter name on January 17, 1882. In 1875, Marion incorporated as a city as a 3rd class city, later in 1888 it became a 2nd class city.

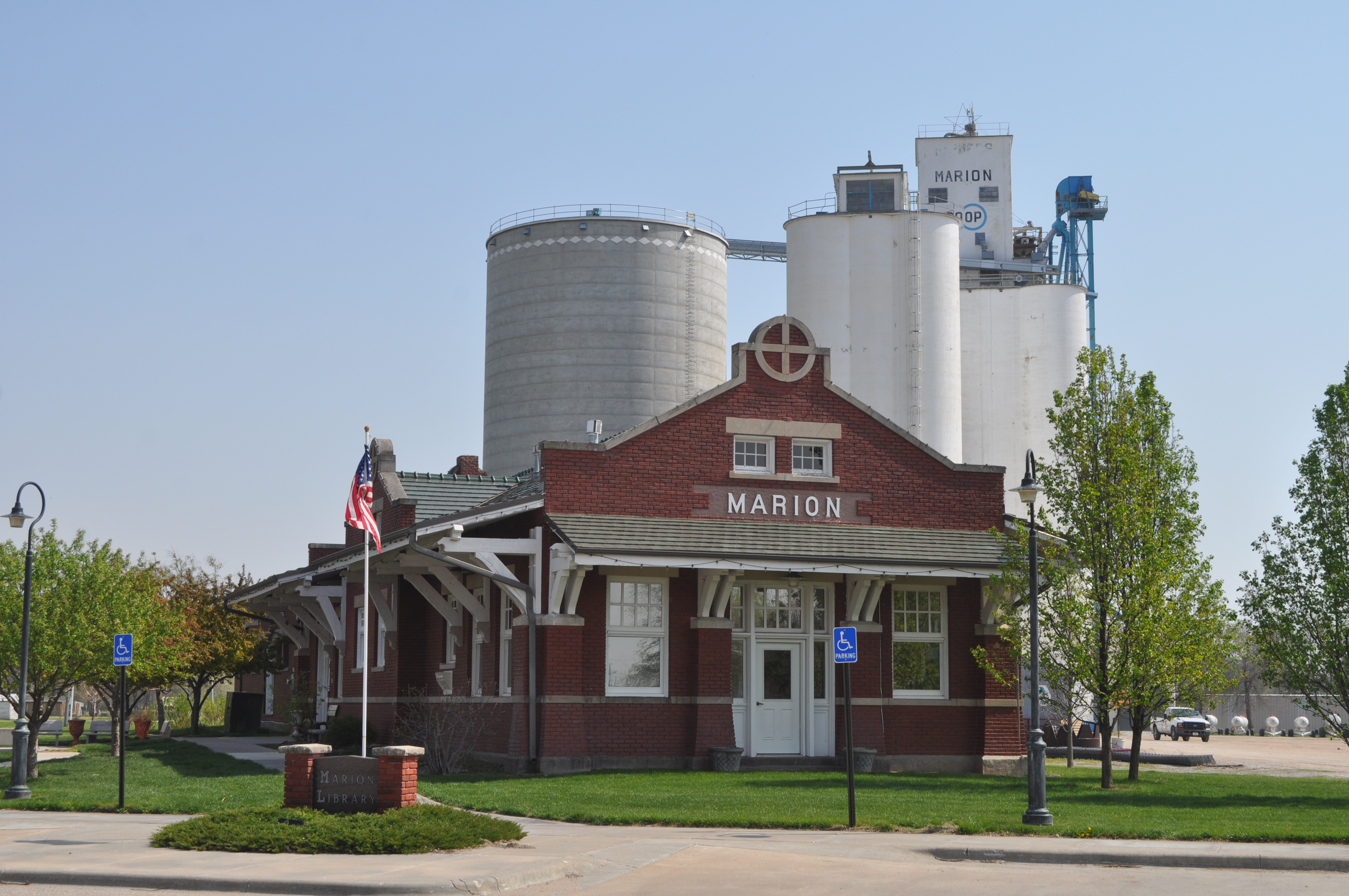
Marion Library, in former Santa Fe depot (Marion CO-OP grain elevator in background) (2011)

As early as 1875, city leaders of Marion held a meeting to consider a branch railroad from Florence. In 1878, Atchison, Topeka and Santa Fe Railway and parties from Marion County and McPherson County chartered the Marion and McPherson Railway Company. In 1879, a branch line was built from Florence to McPherson, in 1880 it was extended to Lyons, in 1881 it was extended to Ellinwood. The line was leased and operated by the Atchison, Topeka and Santa Fe Railway. The line from Florence to Marion, was abandoned in 1968. In 1992, the line from Marion to McPherson was sold to Central Kansas Railway. In 1993, after heavy flood damage, the line from Marion to McPherson was abandoned. The original branch line connected Florence, Marion, Canada, Hillsboro, Lehigh, Canton, Galva, McPherson, Conway, Windom, Little River, Mitchell, Lyons, Chase, and Ellinwood. Later, the Santa Fe depot building was converted into the Marion Library.

In 1887, the Chicago, Kansas and Nebraska Railway built a branch line north-south from Herington through Marion to Caldwell. It foreclosed in 1891 and was taken over by Chicago, Rock Island and Pacific Railway, which shut down in 1980 and reorganized as Oklahoma, Kansas and Texas Railroad, merged in 1988 with Missouri Pacific Railroad, and finally merged in 1997 with Union Pacific Railroad.

In 1889, the Marion Belt and Chingawasa Springs Railroad built a 4.5-mile (7.2 km) railroad from Marion north-east to Chingawasa Springs. A hotel was built near the site of the spa at Chingawasa Springs, and a depot and eatery as well. Both Santa Fe and Rock Island offered round trip fares from Chicago and western cities to Chingawasa Springs. An economic panic in 1893 closed down the health spa and hotel, and quarry business along the tracks never developed sufficiently. In 1893, the railroad ceased operations, and tracks were removed in 1910.

=== 20th century ===
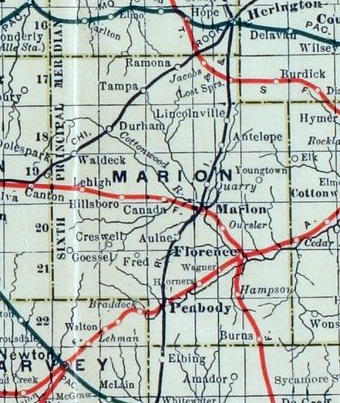
1915 railroad map of Marion County

The National Old Trails Road, also known as the Ocean-to-Ocean Highway, was established in 1912, and was routed through Lehigh, Hillsboro, Marion and Lost Springs.

In 1937, the Marion County Lake was completed by the Civilian Conservation Corps south-east of Marion for the purpose of recreation. There were numerous floods during the early history of Marion. In June and July 1951, due to heavy rains, rivers and streams flooded numerous cities in Kansas, including Marion. Many reservoirs and levees were built in Kansas as part of a response to the Great Flood of 1951. From 1964 to 1968, the Marion Reservoir was constructed north-west of Marion. Downstream from the Marion Reservoir, levees were built in the low areas of Marion and Florence.

=== 21st century ===
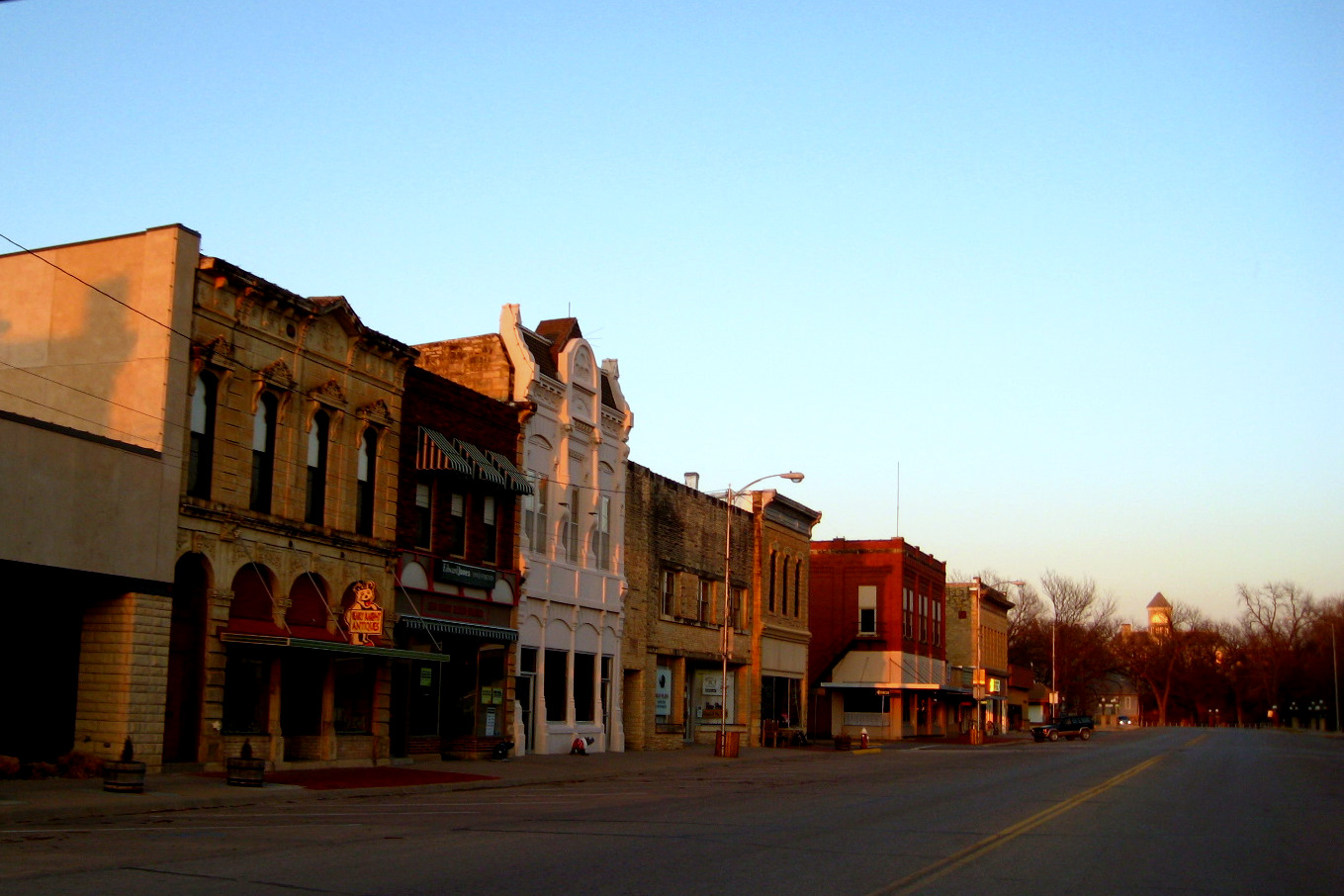
Marion business district (2009)

==== 2023 newspaper raid ====
In August 2023, Marion County police raided the newspaper Marion County Record, its owners, and a local city council member. The police had received information that the paper had obtained, allegedly from a confidential source (it was later shown that legal public sources were used) that a local business owner had an unresolved drunk driving conviction and continued to drive for many months without a driving license. The newspaper did not publish this legally obtained information.

== Geography ==
Marion is located in the scenic Flint Hills and Great Plains of the state of Kansas. According to the United States Census Bureau, the city has a total area of 2.99 square miles (7.74 km^{2}), of which 2.98 square miles (7.72 km^{2}) is land and 0.01 square miles (0.03 km^{2}) is water.

=== Climate ===
The climate in this area is characterized by hot, humid summers and generally mild to cool winters. According to the Köppen Climate Classification system, Marion has a humid subtropical climate, abbreviated "Cfa" on climate maps.

Climate data for Marion, Kansas, 1991–2020 normals, extremes 1966–present
Month	Jan	Feb	Mar	Apr	May	Jun	Jul	Aug	Sep	Oct	Nov	Dec	Year
Record high °F (°C)	74 (23)	80 (27)	88 (31)	95 (35)	98 (37)	105 (41)	110 (43)	109 (43)	107 (42)	97 (36)	83 (28)	74 (23)	110 (43)
Mean maximum °F (°C)	62.5 (16.9)	68.6 (20.3)	77.7 (25.4)	84.6 (29.2)	91.2 (32.9)	97.3 (36.3)	102.5 (39.2)	101.1 (38.4)	95.9 (35.5)	87.8 (31.0)	73.6 (23.1)	63.9 (17.7)	103.5 (39.7)
Mean daily maximum °F (°C)	41.0 (5.0)	45.7 (7.6)	56.8 (13.8)	66.9 (19.4)	76.5 (24.7)	86.9 (30.5)	92.2 (33.4)	90.7 (32.6)	82.7 (28.2)	70.3 (21.3)	55.5 (13.1)	43.8 (6.6)	67.4 (19.7)
Daily mean °F (°C)	31.1 (−0.5)	35.2 (1.8)	45.8 (7.7)	55.8 (13.2)	66.0 (18.9)	76.2 (24.6)	81.2 (27.3)	79.4 (26.3)	71.1 (21.7)	58.5 (14.7)	44.9 (7.2)	34.2 (1.2)	56.6 (13.7)
Mean daily minimum °F (°C)	21.3 (−5.9)	24.7 (−4.1)	34.7 (1.5)	44.6 (7.0)	55.5 (13.1)	65.6 (18.7)	70.1 (21.2)	68.2 (20.1)	59.4 (15.2)	46.7 (8.2)	34.3 (1.3)	24.6 (−4.1)	45.8 (7.7)
Mean minimum °F (°C)	1.1 (−17.2)	5.4 (−14.8)	15.0 (−9.4)	27.2 (−2.7)	38.8 (3.8)	51.8 (11.0)	57.8 (14.3)	56.0 (13.3)	42.3 (5.7)	28.3 (−2.1)	17.0 (−8.3)	7.0 (−13.9)	−2.5 (−19.2)
Record low °F (°C)	−16 (−27)	−20 (−29)	−5 (−21)	11 (−12)	26 (−3)	42 (6)	46 (8)	47 (8)	28 (−2)	14 (−10)	4 (−16)	−24 (−31)	−24 (−31)
Average precipitation inches (mm)	0.80 (20)	1.21 (31)	2.15 (55)	3.11 (79)	5.20 (132)	4.54 (115)	4.34 (110)	3.98 (101)	3.50 (89)	2.55 (65)	1.38 (35)	1.18 (30)	33.94 (862)
Average snowfall inches (cm)	1.3 (3.3)	0.8 (2.0)	0.9 (2.3)	0.4 (1.0)	0.0 (0.0)	0.0 (0.0)	0.0 (0.0)	0.0 (0.0)	0.0 (0.0)	0.1 (0.25)	0.3 (0.76)	1.5 (3.8)	5.3 (13.41)
Average precipitation days (≥ 0.01 in)	3.9	3.8	5.8	7.4	9.9	8.6	8.4	7.5	6.6	6.0	3.8	4.0	75.7
Average snowy days (≥ 0.1 in)	1.0	0.5	0.3	0.1	0.0	0.0	0.0	0.0	0.0	0.1	0.2	0.9	3.1
Source 1: NOAA
Source 2: National Weather Service

== Demographics ==
Historical population
Census	Pop.	Note	%±
1880	857		—
1890	2,047		138.9%
1900	1,824		−10.9%
1910	1,841		0.9%
1920	1,928		4.7%
1930	1,959		1.6%
1940	2,086		6.5%
1950	2,050		−1.7%
1960	2,169		5.8%
1970	2,052		−5.4%
1980	1,951		−4.9%
1990	1,906		−2.3%
2000	2,110		10.7%
2010	1,927		−8.7%
2020	1,922		−0.3%
U.S. Decennial Census

=== 2020 census ===
As of the 2020 census, Marion had a population of 1,922, with 860 households and 502 families. The population density was 696.9 per square mile (269.1/km^{2}). There were 971 housing units at an average density of 352.1 per square mile (135.9/km^{2}).

The median age was 46.3 years. 20.3% of residents were under the age of 18, 7.8% were from 18 to 24, 20.9% were from 25 to 44, 26.3% were from 45 to 64, and 24.7% were 65 years of age or older. For every 100 females there were 87.7 males, and for every 100 females age 18 and over there were 84.9 males age 18 and over.

There were 860 households, of which 23.8% had children under the age of 18 living in them. Of all households, 46.4% were married-couple households, 19.4% were households with a male householder and no spouse or partner present, and 29.8% were households with a female householder and no spouse or partner present. About 37.7% of all households were made up of individuals, and 21.3% had someone living alone who was 65 years of age or older. The average household size was 2.2 and the average family size was 2.9.

0.0% of residents lived in urban areas, while 100.0% lived in rural areas. There were 971 housing units, of which 11.4% were vacant. The homeowner vacancy rate was 2.2% and the rental vacancy rate was 14.5%.

Racial composition as of the 2020 census
Race	Number	Percent
White	1,810	94.2%
Black or African American	2	0.1%
American Indian and Alaska Native	9	0.5%
Asian	1	0.1%
Native Hawaiian and Other Pacific Islander	0	0.0%
Some other race	5	0.3%
Two or more races	95	4.9%
Hispanic or Latino (of any race)	64	3.3%

=== Education ===
The percent of those with a bachelor's degree or higher was estimated to be 18.4% of the population.

=== Income and poverty ===
The 2016–2020 5-year American Community Survey estimates show that the median household income was $46,548 (with a margin of error of +/- $5,836) and the median family income was $59,028 (+/- $9,025). Males had a median income of $40,000 (+/- $11,143) versus $28,750 (+/- $8,663) for females. The median income for those above 16 years old was $32,826 (+/- $3,144). Approximately, 5.2% of families and 5.5% of the population were below the poverty line, including 4.9% of those under the age of 18 and 4.2% of those ages 65 or over.

=== 2010 census ===
At the 2010 census, there were 1,927 people, 846 households, and 514 families residing in the city. The population density was 646.6 per square mile (249.7/km^{2}). There were 973 housing units at an average density of 326.5 per square mile (126.1/km^{2}). The racial makeup of the city was 97.6% White, 0.6% African American, 0.3% Native American, 0.1% Asian, 0.1% Pacific Islander, 0.5% from other races, and 0.8% from two or more races. Hispanic or Latino of any race were 1.4% of the population.

There were 846 households, of which 28.6% had children under the age of 18 living with them, 47.3% were married couples living together, 9.6% had a female householder with no husband present, 3.9% had a male householder with no wife present, and 39.2% were non-families. 36.2% of all households were made up of individuals, and 19.5% had someone living alone who was 65 years of age or older. The average household size was 2.23 and the average family size was 2.90.

The median age was 44 years. 24.3% of residents were under the age of 18; 6.6% were between the ages of 18 and 24; 20.5% were from 25 to 44; 25.6% were from 45 to 64; and 23% were 65 years of age or older. The gender makeup was 47.5% male and 52.5% female.

== Arts and culture ==
=== Area events ===
- Chingawassa Days Festival
- Old Settler's Day
- Art in the Park and Craft Show

=== Area attractions ===
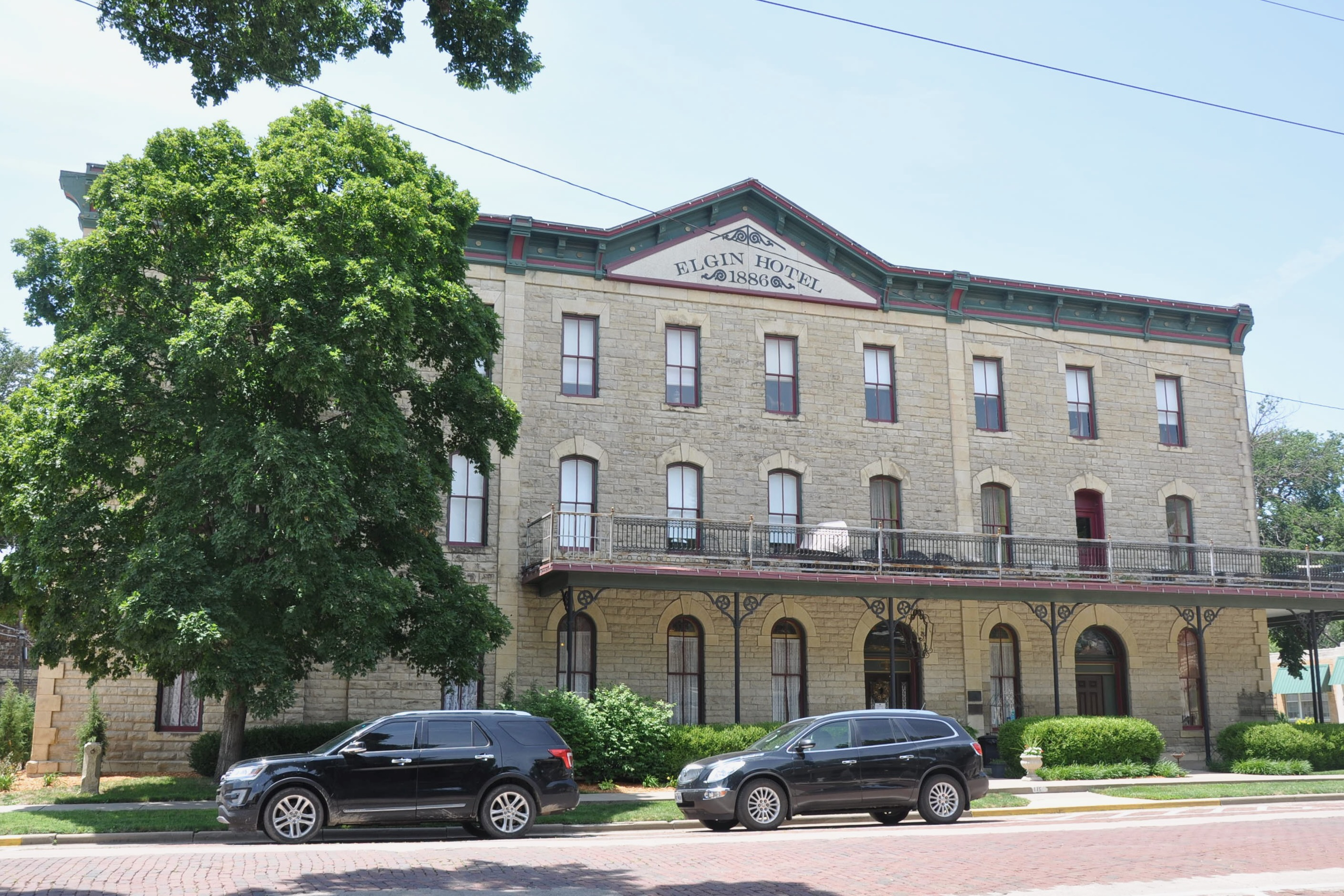
1886 Elgin Hotel (2022)

Marion has five listings on the National Register of Historic Places (NRHP).

- Elgin Hotel (NRHP), 115 North 3rd Street. Currently a Bed and Breakfast.
- First Presbyterian Church (NRHP), 610 East Lawrence Street.
- Hill Grade School (NRHP), 601 East Main Street.
- Marion County Courthouse (NRHP), 200 South 3rd Street.
- Marion County Museum, 623 East Main Street. Formerly the First Baptist Church from 1882 to mid-1950s.

Nearby recreational areas:

- Marion County Lake, southeast of Marion, 1-mile (1.6 km) east of Marion on 190th Street (Main) then 1.75 miles (2.82 km) south on Upland Road.
- Marion Reservoir, northwest of Marion, exists along US-56 (closest to farthest): Marion cove and Cottonwood Point cove (Pawnee Road), Overlook and Dam (Old Mill Road), Hillsboro cove (Nighthawk Road), French Creek cove (Limestone Road).

== Government ==
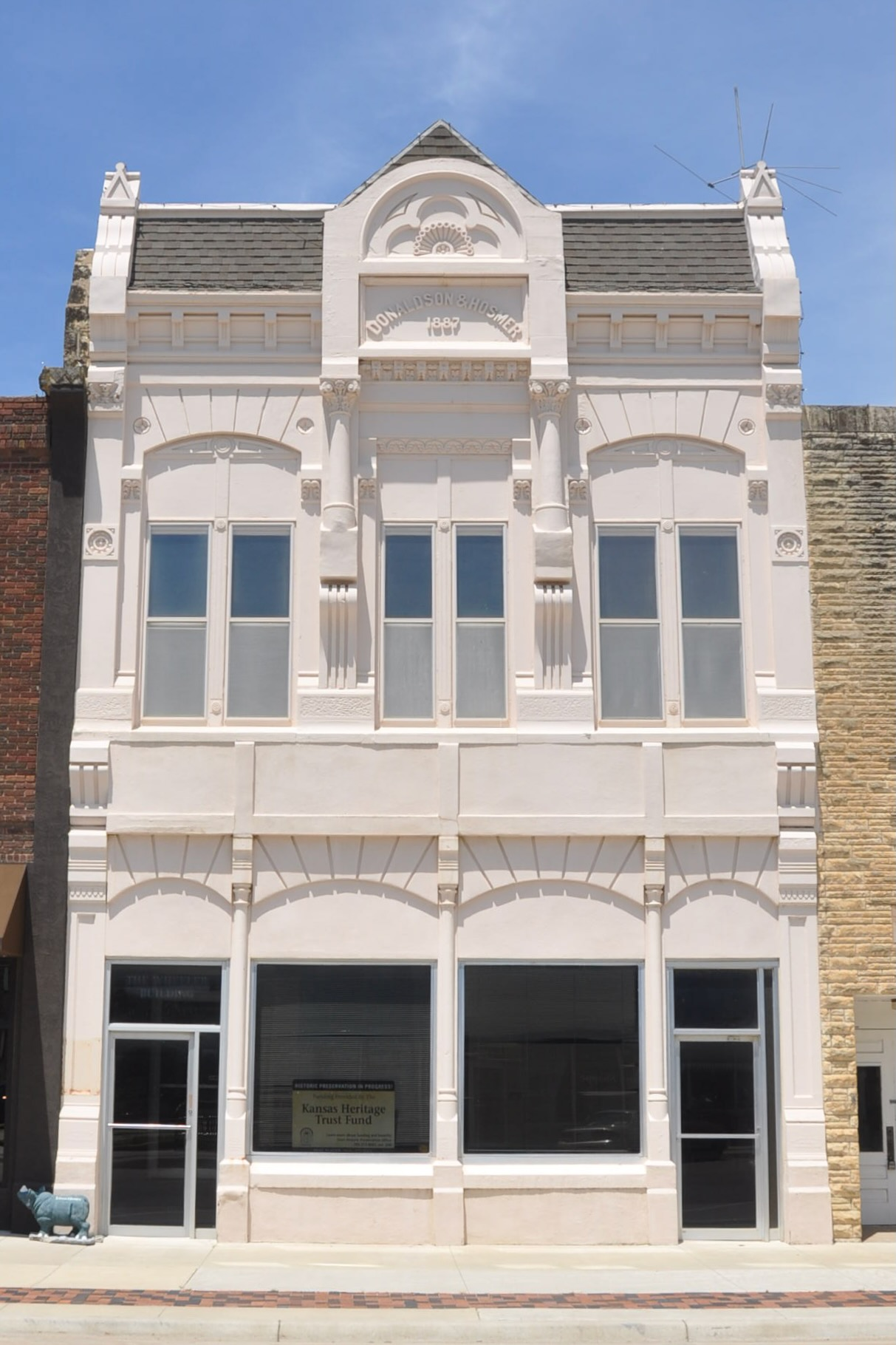
1887 Donaldson and Hosmer Building (2022)

=== City ===
The Marion government consists of a mayor and four council members. The city council meets every other Monday at 4:30pm.

- City Hall – 208 E. Santa Fe St.
- Police Department – 112 N. 5th St. As of August 2023, the police department had five full time members.
- Fire Department – 114 N. 5th St.

=== County ===
- Marion County Courthouse – 203 S. 4th St.

=== U.S. ===
- U.S. Post Office – 423 E. Main St.
- U.S. Consolidated Farm Service Agency – 301 N. Eisenhower Dr.

== Education ==
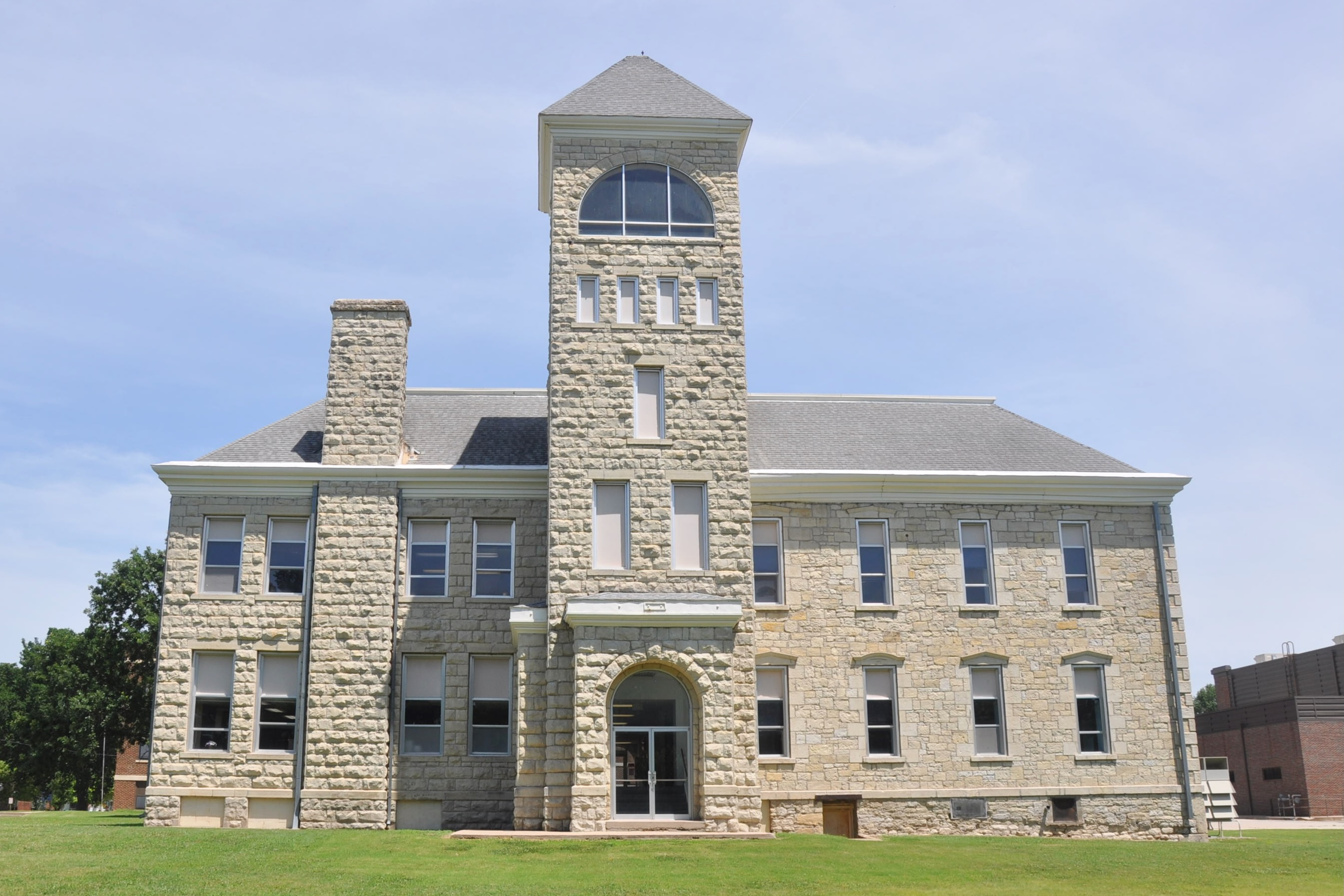
former Hill Grade School (2022)

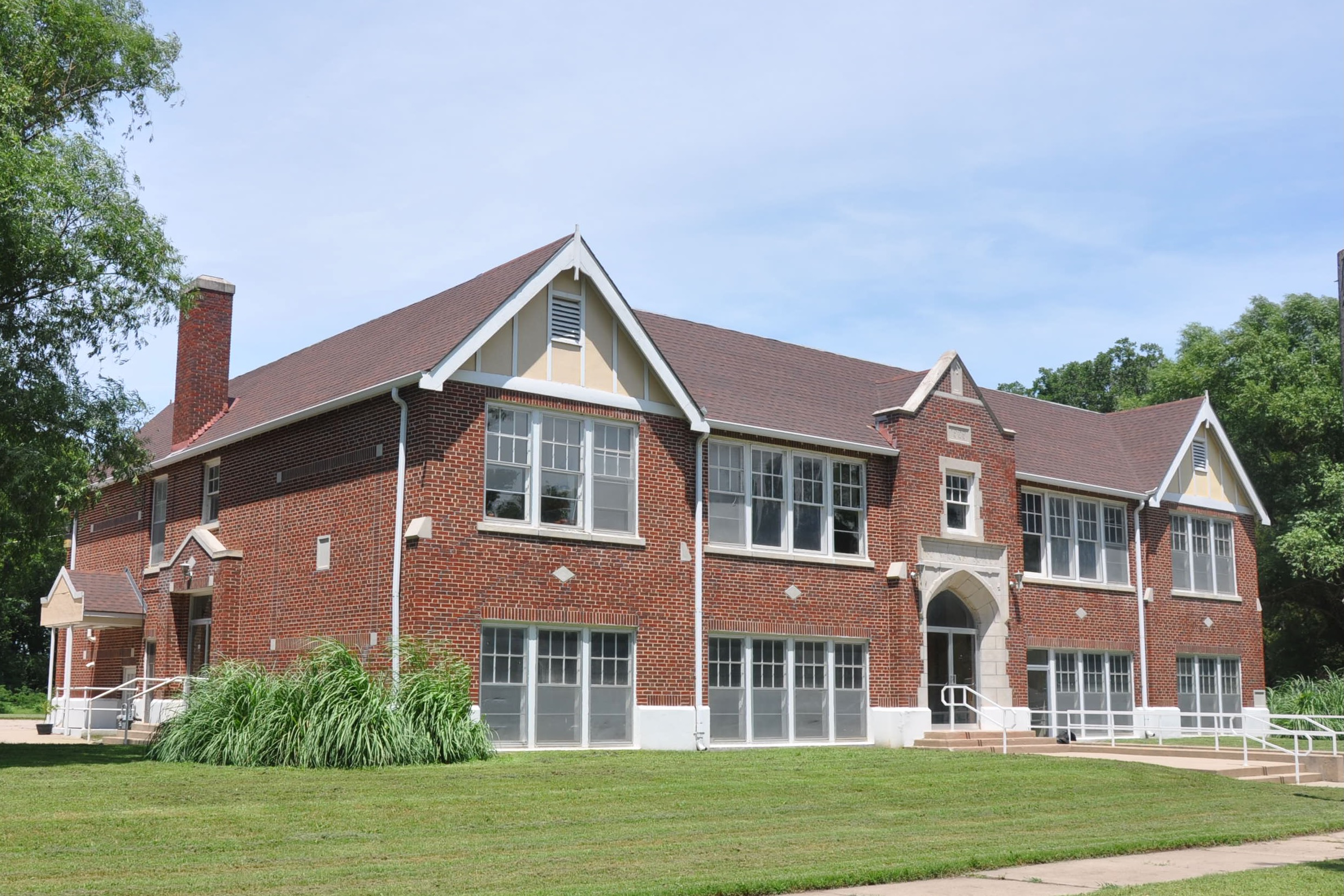
former Bown-Corby Grade School (2022)

=== Public schools ===
The community is served by Marion–Florence USD 408 public school district. The high school is a member of T.E.E.N., a shared video teaching network between five area high schools.

- Marion High School (Kansas), 701 E Main St.
- Marion Middle School, 125 S Lincoln St.
- Marion Elementary School, 1400 E Lawrence St.

=== Library ===
Each USD 408 school has a library for student access. The city is served by the Marion City Library at 101 Library Street. The library is a member of the North Central Kansas Libraries System, which provides an inter-library book loan service between its members.

== Media ==
=== Print ===
- Marion County Record, official newspaper for City of Marion and Marion County.
- Hillsboro Free Press, free newspaper for greater Marion County area.

=== Radio ===
Marion is served by numerous radio stations from the Wichita-Hutchinson listening market area, and satellite radio. (See Media in Wichita, Kansas.)

=== Television ===
Marion is served by over-the-air ATSC digital TV of the Wichita-Hutchinson viewing market area, cable TV, and satellite TV. (See Media in Wichita, Kansas.)

== Infrastructure ==
=== Transportation ===
U.S. Route 56 runs along the city's northern side, and U.S. Route 77 is 2 miles (3.2 km) east of the city. Kansas Highway 256 runs through the center of town as Main Street, past the east end business section, Marion High School and the downtown business district. A regional Kansas Department of Transportation office is located on the northern side of Marion at the corner of U.S. Route 56 and Cedar Street.

The Oklahoma Kansas Texas (OKT) line of the Union Pacific Railroad runs north-south through the city. The Chicago, Rock Island and Pacific Railroad's Kansas City Rocket formerly provided passenger rail service to Marion on their Mid-Continent Route until at least 1963. As of 2025, the nearest passenger rail station is located in Newton, where Amtrak's Southwest Chief stops once daily on a route from Chicago to Los Angeles.

The Atchison, Topeka and Santa Fe also previously provided passenger and freight rail service to Marion. A brick depot was built in June 1912, which now stands as the city library.

Marion Municipal Airport, FAA:43K, is located south-east of Marion and centered at 38.337500°N 96.991666°W.

== Notable people ==
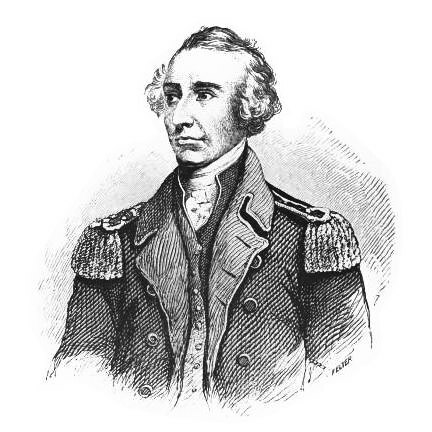
Francis Marion (late 1700s)

- Randolph Carpenter (1894–1956), U.S. Representative from Kansas and a U.S. Army World War I veteran.
- Charlie Faust (1880–1915), Major League baseball player
- Beverly Hoch (born 1951), soprano
- Edward Hoch (1849–1925), Kansas House of Representatives, 17th governor of Kansas, editor of Marion County Record, Hoch Auditoria at University of Kansas was named after him.
- Homer Hoch (1879–1949), U.S. Congressman, member of Kansas Supreme Court, lawyer, editor of Marion County Record
- Tex Jones (1885–1938), Major League baseball player
- Eric Meyer (born 1953), journalism professor at University of Illinois, Pulitzer Prize nominee, president and majority owner of Hoch Publishing Co (in Marion)
- Fay Moulton (1876–1945), Olympic sprinter, football player and coach, lawyer; served as fifth head football coach at Kansas State Agricultural College (Kansas State University)
- Samuel Peters (1842–1910), Captain in Union Army (1861–1865), lawyer, Kansas State Senator (1874–1875), Judge of 9th District (1875–1883), U.S. House of Representatives (1883–1891), newspaper editor
- William Runyan (1870–1957), preacher, composer of "Great Is Thy Faithfulness"
- Carla Stovall (born 1957), Kansas Attorney General

== See also ==
- Cottonwood River and Great Flood of 1951
- Historical Maps of Marion County, Kansas
- National Old Trails Road
- National Register of Historic Places listings in Marion County, Kansas
