= Canada, Kansas =

Unincorporated community in Marion County, Kansas

- Unincorporated community
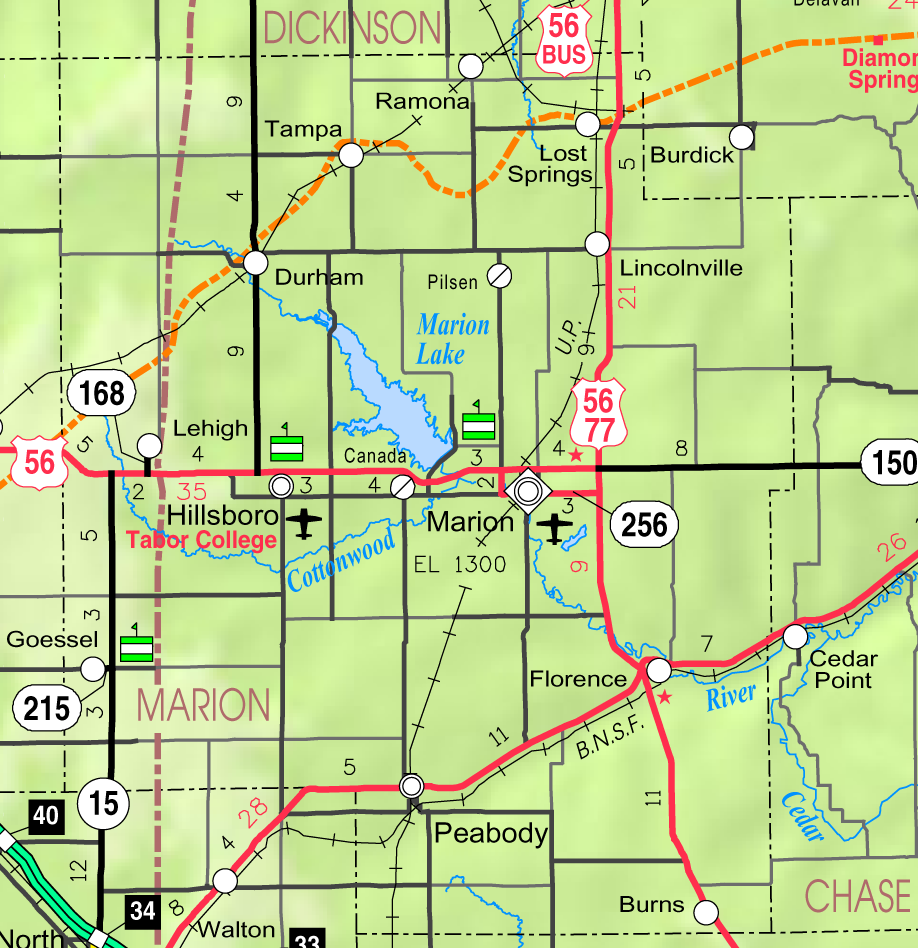
- KDOT map of Marion County (legend)

- Location within Kansas Location within the United States
- Coordinates: 38°21′15″N 97°06′46″W
- Country: United States
- State: Kansas
- County: Marion
- Township: Gale
- Founded: 1883
- Platted: 1883
- Named for: Canada
- Elevation: 1,362 ft (415 m)
- Time zone: UTC-6 (CST)
  - Summer (DST): UTC-5 (CDT)
- Area code: 620
- FIPS code: 20-10350
- GNIS ID: 477365

Canada is an unincorporated community in Marion County, Kansas, United States. It is named for many Canadian immigrants coming to the area. It is located between Hillsboro and Marion, approximately 0.5 mile south of the intersection of Nighthawk Road and U.S. Route 56 highway, southwest of the Hillsboro Cove of the Marion Reservoir.

== History ==
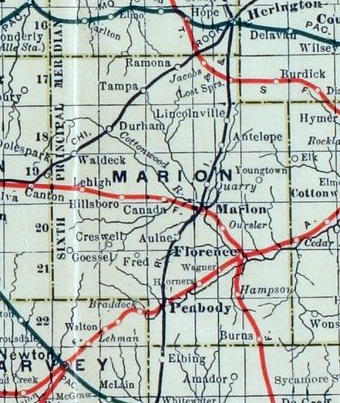
1915 railroad map of Marion County

=== Early history ===
For many millennia, the Great Plains of North America was inhabited by nomadic Native Americans. From the 16th century to 18th century, the Kingdom of France claimed ownership of large parts of North America. In 1762, after the French and Indian War, France secretly ceded New France to Spain, per the Treaty of Fontainebleau.

=== 19th century ===
In 1802, Spain returned most of the land to France. In 1803, most of the land for modern day Kansas was acquired by the United States from France as part of the 828,000 square mile Louisiana Purchase for 2.83 cents per acre.

In 1854, the Kansas Territory was organized, then in 1861 Kansas became the 34th U.S. state. In 1855, Marion County was established within the Kansas Territory, which included the land for modern day Canada.

David Christie, former Speaker of the Senate of Canada, sent his sons to buy 3 square miles (8 km^{2}) near the future site of Canada. Many Canadian immigrants moved to the area, thus becoming the source of the community. Canada was platted on December 15, 1883, but never incorporated.

As early as 1875, city leaders of Marion held a meeting to consider a branch railroad from Florence. In 1878, Atchison, Topeka and Santa Fe Railway and parties from Marion and McPherson counties chartered the Marion and McPherson Railway Company. In 1879, a branch line was built from Florence to McPherson; in 1880 it was extended to Lyons and in 1881 was extended to Ellinwood. The line was leased and operated by the Atchison, Topeka and Santa Fe Railway. The line from Florence to Marion was abandoned in 1968. In 1992, the line from Marion to McPherson was sold to Central Kansas Railway. In 1993, after heavy flood damage, the line from Marion through Canada to McPherson was abandoned and removed. The original branch line connected Florence, Marion, Canada, Hillsboro, Lehigh, Canton, Galva, McPherson, Conway, Windom, Little River, Mitchell, Lyons, Chase and Ellinwood.

A post office existed in Canada from February 20, 1884 to February 28, 1954.

=== 20th century ===
From 1964 to 1968, the Marion Reservoir was constructed north of Canada.

=== 21st century ===
In August 2015, a film crew for an advertising agency in Toronto, Ontario came to Canada to interview residents and give away New Balance shoes for a Canadian TV commercial.

== Geography ==
Canada is located at coordinates 38.3541802, -97.1128030 in the scenic Flint Hills and Great Plains of the state of Kansas. It is approximately halfway between Marion and Hillsboro.

== Area attractions ==
- Marion Reservoir, one mile (two km) north of Canada. The Hillsboro cove is closest to Canada. Exits along US-56: French Creek cove (Limestone Road), Hillsboro cove (Nighthawk Road), Overlook and Dam (Old Mill Road), Marion cove and Cottonwood Point cove (Pawnee Road).

== Education ==
The community is served by Marion–Florence USD 408 public school district. All students attend schools in Marion. The high school is a member of T.E.E.N., a shared video teaching network between five area high schools.

- Marion High School, located in Marion.
- Marion Middle School, located in Marion.
- Marion Elementary School, located in Marion.

== Media ==
=== Print ===
- Marion County Record, county newspaper from Marion.
- Hillsboro Free Press, free newspaper for greater Marion County area.

== Infrastructure ==
=== Transportation ===
U.S. Route 56 highway is 0.5 miles (0.80 km) north of the community. U.S. 56 was previously located 0.5 miles (0.80 km) south of the community.

=== Utilities ===
- Internet
  - Satellite is provided by HughesNet, StarBand, WildBlue.
- TV
  - Satellite is provided by DirecTV, Dish Network.
  - Terrestrial is provided by regional digital TV stations.
- Electricity
  - Community and Rural areas provided by Flint Hills RECA.
- Water
  - Community and Rural areas provided by Marion County RWD #4 (map).
