= Gale Township, Kansas =

Gale Township Marion County, Kansas
- Township
- Location within Marion County

- Location within the state of Kansas
- Coordinates: 38.3933168°N 97.0982251°W
- Country: United States
- State: Kansas
- County: Marion

Area
  - Total: 34 sq mi (88 km^{2})

Dimensions
  - Length: 6.0 mi (9.7 km)
  - Width: 6.0 mi (9.7 km)
- Elevation: 1,348 ft (411 m)

Population (2020)
  - Total: 239
  - Density: 7.0/sq mi (2.7/km^{2})
- Time zone: UTC-6 (CST)
  - Summer (DST): UTC-5 (CDT)
- Area code: 620
- FIPS code: 20-25075
- GNIS ID: 477230
- Website: County website

Gale Township is a township in Marion County, Kansas, United States. As of the 2020 census, the township population was 239, including Canada and Eastshore.

== Geography ==
Gale Township covers an area of 34 square miles (88.1 km^{2}). The Marion Reservoir is located in the township.

== Communities ==
The township contains the following settlements:

- Unincorporated community of Canada.
- Unincorporated community of Eastshore.

== Cemeteries ==
The township contains the following cemeteries:

- Brunk Cemetery (no longer in use), located in Section 31 T19S R3E.
- Canada Cemetery, located in Section 28 T19S R3E.
- Mennonite Church Ebenezer of Bruderthal Cemetery (in 1965 while Marion Reservoir was built, it was moved to "Haven of Rest" in Liberty Township), located in Section 19 T19S R3E.
- Strassburg Cemetery, located in Section 14 T19S R3E.
