= Marion–Florence USD 408 =

Public school district in Marion, Kansas

Address
- 101 N. Thorp St. Marion, Kansas, 66861; United States
- Coordinates: 38°20′56″N 97°0′25″W

District information
- Type: Public
- Grades: K to 12
- Superintendent: Justin Wasmuth
- Schools: 3

Other information
- Website: usd408.com

Marion–Florence USD 408 is a public unified school district headquartered in Marion, Kansas, United States. The district includes the communities of Marion, Florence, Aulne, Canada, Eastshore, Marion County Lake, and nearby rural areas of Marion County.

== History ==
The number of students in rural communities dropped significantly across the 20th century. As farming technology progressed from animal power to small tractors towards large tractors over time, it allowed a farmer to support significantly more farm land. In turn, this led to fewer farm families, which led to fewer rural students. In combination with a loss of young men during foreign wars and rural flight, all of these caused an incremental population shrinkage of rural communities over time.

In 1945 (after World War II), the School Reorganization Act in Kansas caused the consolidation of thousands of rural school districts in Kansas.

In 1963, the School Unification Act in Kansas caused the further consolidatation of thousands of tiny school districts into hundreds of larger Unified School Districts.

In 1969, Florence was one of a hand full of school districts that was still non-unified. In April 1969, the state legislature passed a law pushing all remaining non-unified school districts to attach themselves to an adjacent unified school district by July 1, or the state would decide which adjacent district(s) would get their territory. In June 1969, the Florence school district held a vote choosing between Marion, Peabody, Chase County school districts, the winner was Marion.

In fall 1971, grade school and high school students from Florence started attending schools in Marion, middle school students from Marion started attending school in Florence, and the Florence High School closed.

=== Current schools ===
The school district operates the following schools:

- Marion High School at 701 East Main Street in Marion
- Marion Middle School at 125 South Lincoln Street in Marion
- Marion Elementary School at 1400 East Lawrence Street in Marion

=== Closed schools ===
- Florence High School in Florence. It was closed in 1971.
- Florence Elementary School in Florence. It was closed.

== See also ==
- Kansas State Department of Education
- Kansas State High School Activities Association
- List of high schools in Kansas
- List of unified school districts in Kansas
