= Harvey House (Florence, Kansas) =

Historic house in Kansas, United States

- U.S. National Register of Historic Places
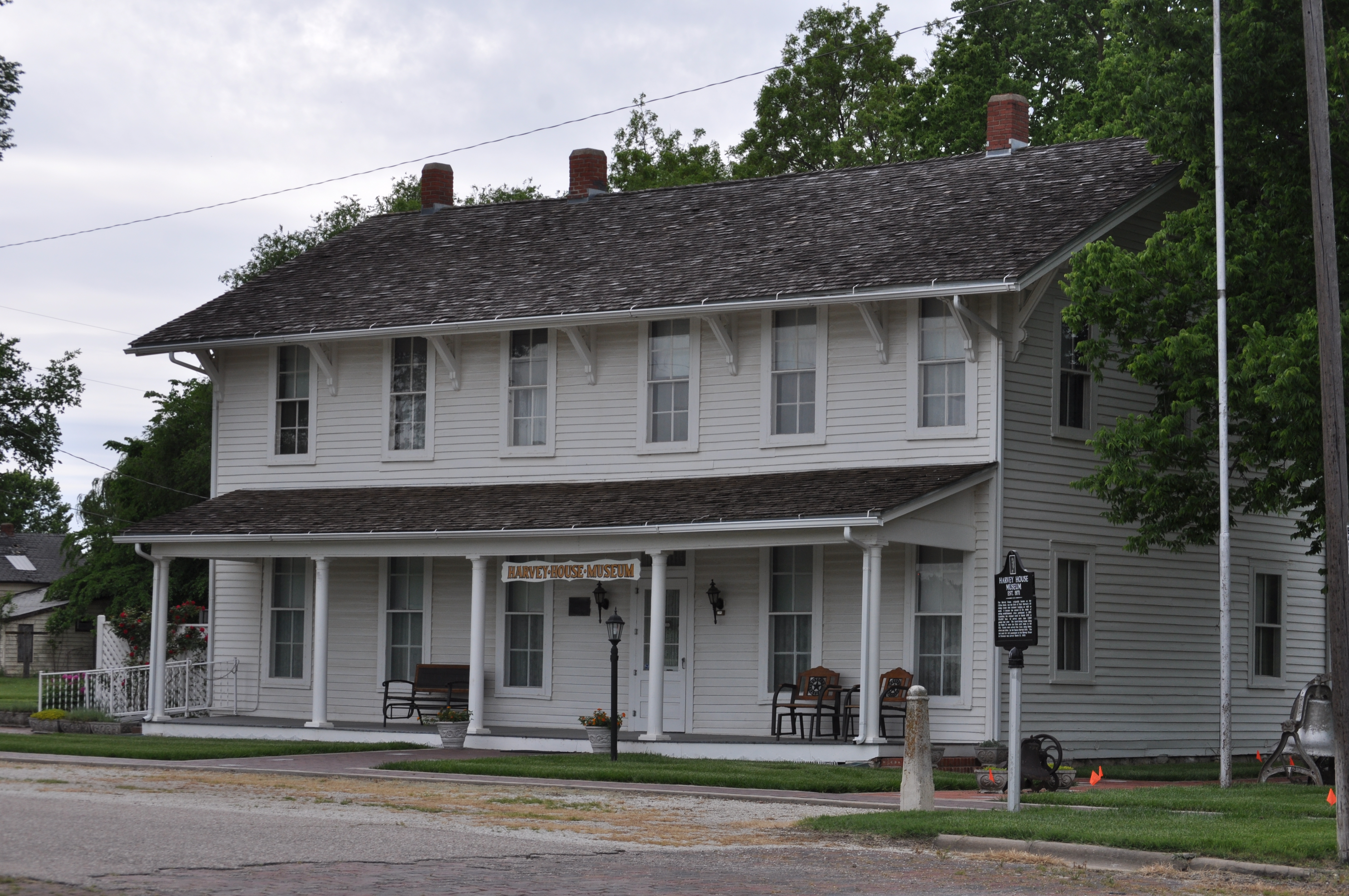
- Harvey House Museum (2016)

- Location within Kansas Location within the United States
- Location: 221 N Marion Street; Florence, Kansas, 66851
- Coordinates: 38°14′24″N 96°55′41″W
- Built: 1876
- Restored: 1971 (museum)
- NRHP reference No.: 73000763
- Added to NRHP: August 14, 1973

Harvey House of Florence, Kansas, United States, also known under the older name of Clifton Hotel, was listed on the National Register of Historic Places (NRHP) in 1973.

== History ==
The building is part of the first Fred Harvey House, of the Fred Harvey Company, which stood south of the Santa Fe railroad tracks until the early 20th century. The existing structure was the original part of the Clifton Hotel that was erected to serve passengers of the Atchison, Topeka and Santa Fe Railway as a permanent eating station and hotel for passengers. This Harvey House was the first one to provide sleeping facilities. The Harvey House was built in 1876 and closed in 1900. Operations were transferred to Newton, and it has become a museum.

== TV ==
- Feasting on Asphalt, 2006, season 1 episode 3 titled "High Plains Feaster", 7.5 minutes of video while Alton Brown visited the Spring Fling event and Harvey House in Florence.

== See also ==
- National Register of Historic Places listings in Marion County, Kansas
