= Thomas Chisholm (songwriter) =

American hymnwriter (1866–1960)

The Reverend Thomas Chisholm
- Born: Thomas Obadiah Chisholm; July 29, 1866; Near Franklin, Kentucky, US
- Died: February 29, 1960 (aged 93); Ocean Grove, New Jersey, US
- Other names: T. O. Chisholm
- Occupations: Hymnwriter; poet; minister

Ecclesiastical career
- Religion: Christianity (Methodist)
- Church: Methodist Episcopal Church, South
- Ordained: 1903
- Writing career
- Genres: Christian hymnody; Christian poetry; gospel music
- Notable works: "Living for Jesus" (1917); "Great Is Thy Faithfulness" (1923)

Thomas Obadiah Chisholm (/ˈtʃɪzəm/ CHIZ-əm; July 29, 1866 – February 29, 1960) was an American hymnwriter, poet, and Methodist minister.

Chisholm was born on July 29, 1866, in a log cabin near Franklin, Kentucky. He became a teacher at the age of 16. Circa 1893, aged 27, Chisholm had a Christian conversion experience during a revival in Franklin led by Henry Clay Morrison. Following his ordination in 1903, served as a minister in the Methodist Episcopal Church, South, for one year before resigning due to poor health. After 1909 Chisholm began working as a life insurance agent in Winona Lake and later in Vineland, New Jersey.

Chisholm wrote over 1,200 sacred poems over his lifetime, many of which appeared in various Christian periodicals, and he served as an editor of The Pentecostal Herald in Louisville for a period. In 1923, Chisholm wrote the poem "Great Is Thy Faithfulness" which he submitted to William M. Runyan who was affiliated with the Moody Bible Institute and Runyan set the song to music. He also wrote the lyrics "Living for Jesus", composed by C. Harold Lowden. Towards the end of his life, Chisholm retired to the Methodist Home for the Aged in Ocean Grove, New Jersey. He died on February 29, 1960, in Ocean Grove.
