= Florence, Kansas =

City in Marion County, Kansas

- City
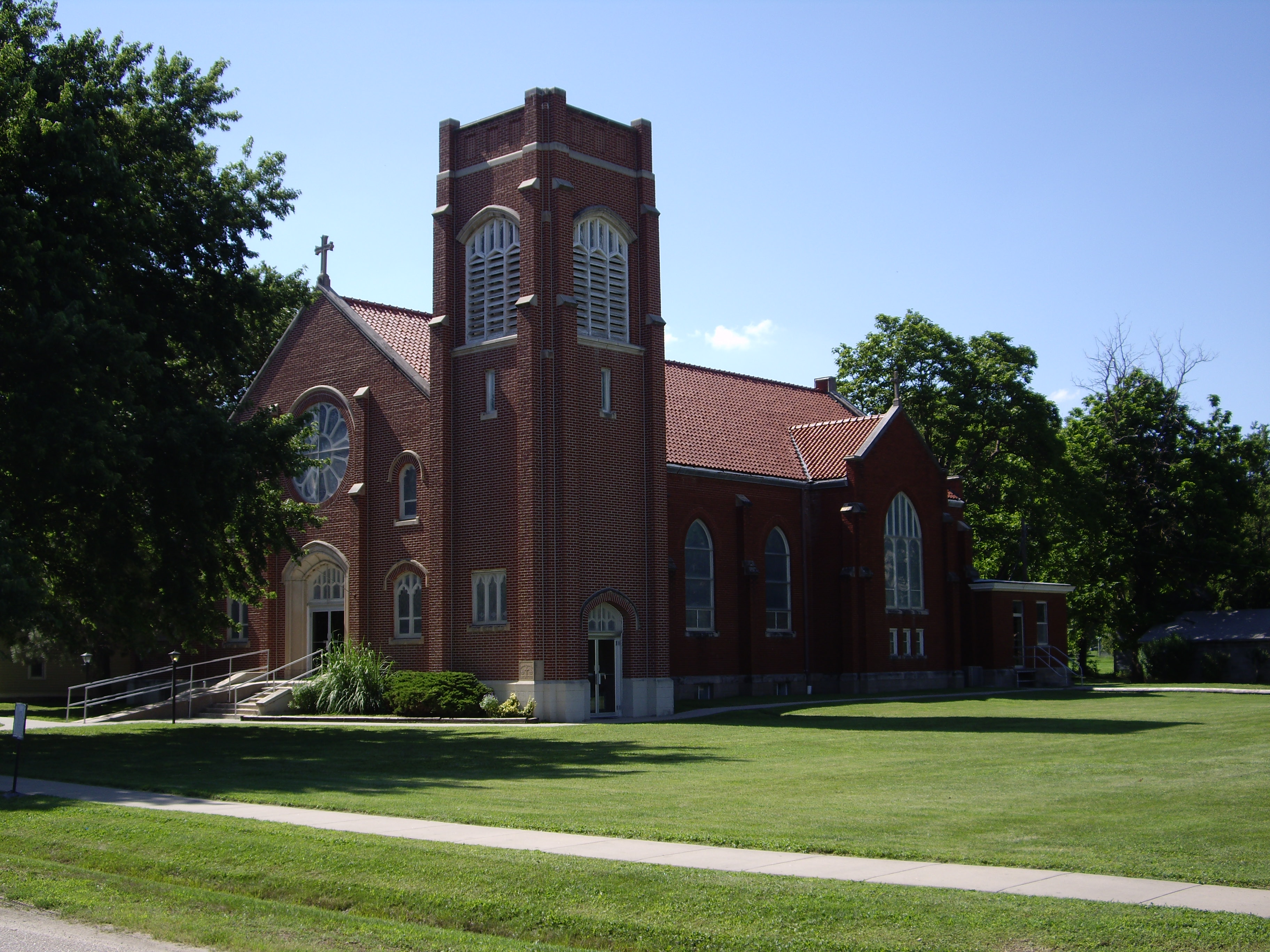
- St Patrick Catholic Church (2010)

- Location within Marion County and Kansas

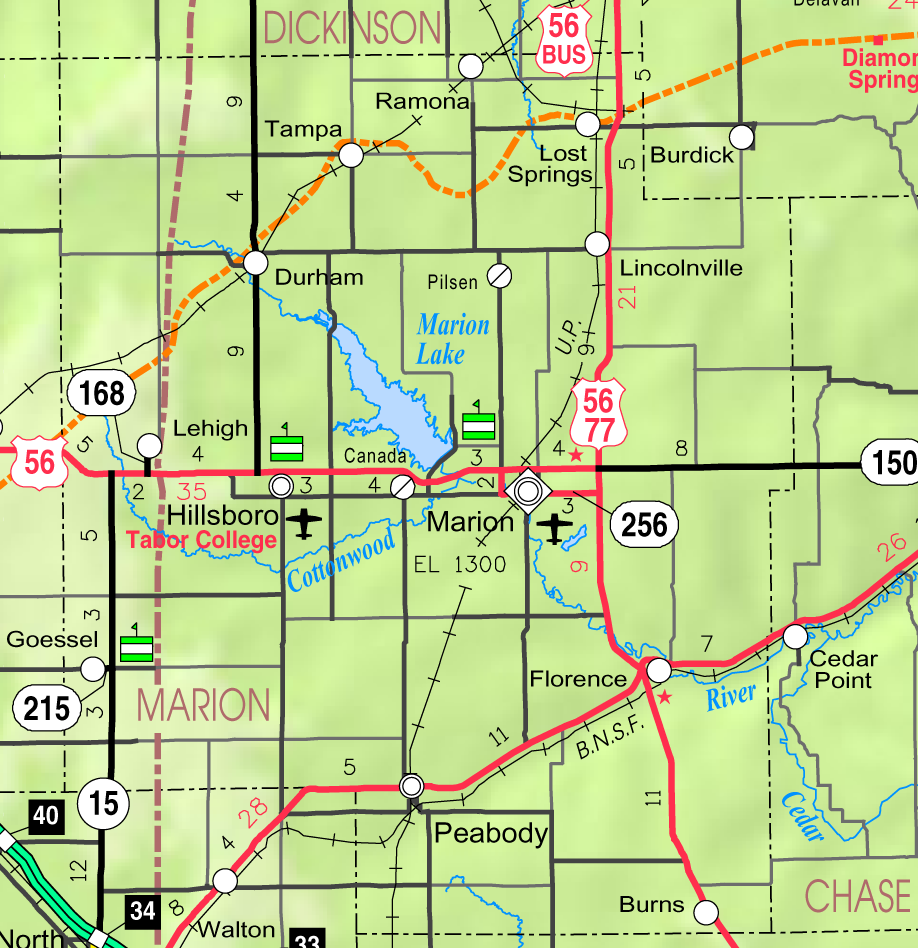
- KDOT map of Marion County (legend)
- Coordinates: 38°14′35″N 96°55′45″W
- Country: United States
- State: Kansas
- County: Marion
- Township: Doyle, Fairplay
- Platted: 1870
- Incorporated: 1872
- Named for: Florence Crawford

Government
  - Type: Mayor–Council
  - Mayor: Robert Gayle Jr.

Area
  - Total: 0.77 sq mi (1.99 km^{2})
  - Land: 0.76 sq mi (1.98 km^{2})
  - Water: 0 sq mi (0.00 km^{2})
- Elevation: 1,270 ft (390 m)

Population (2020)
  - Total: 394
  - Density: 515/sq mi (199/km^{2})
- Time zone: UTC-6 (CST)
  - Summer (DST): UTC-5 (CDT)
- ZIP Code: 66851
- Area code: 620
- FIPS code: 20-23600
- GNIS ID: 485574
- Website: FlorenceKS.com

Florence is a city in Marion County, Kansas, United States. As of the 2020 census, the population of the city was 394. The city was named after the daughter of the third governor of Kansas, Samuel J. Crawford. It is located at the intersection of U.S. routes 50 and 77 highways.

== History ==
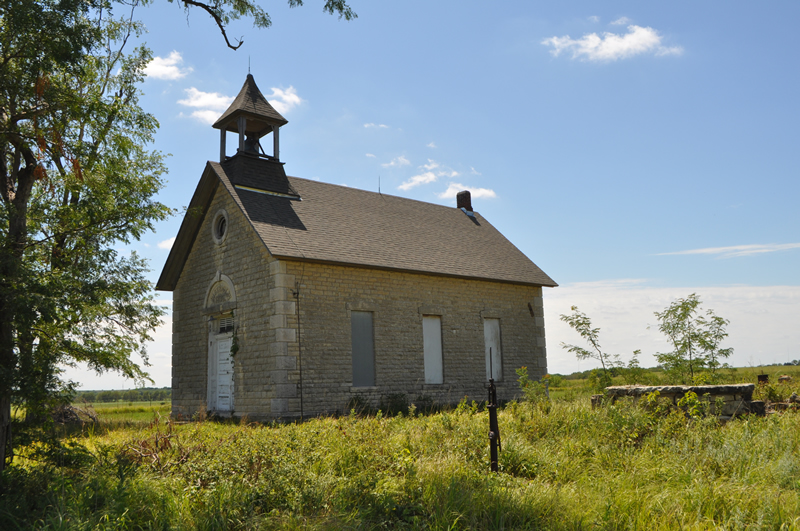
1896 Bichet School, 3 miles (4.8 km) east of Florence (2011)

=== Early history ===
For millennia, the Great Plains of North America was inhabited by nomadic Native Americans. These tribes considered native included: the Arapaho, Cheyenne, Comanche, Kansa, Kiowa, Osage, Pawnee, and Wichita. From the 16th century to 18th century, the Kingdom of France claimed ownership of large parts of North America. In 1762, after the French and Indian War, France secretly ceded New France to Spain, per the Treaty of Fontainebleau.

=== 19th century ===
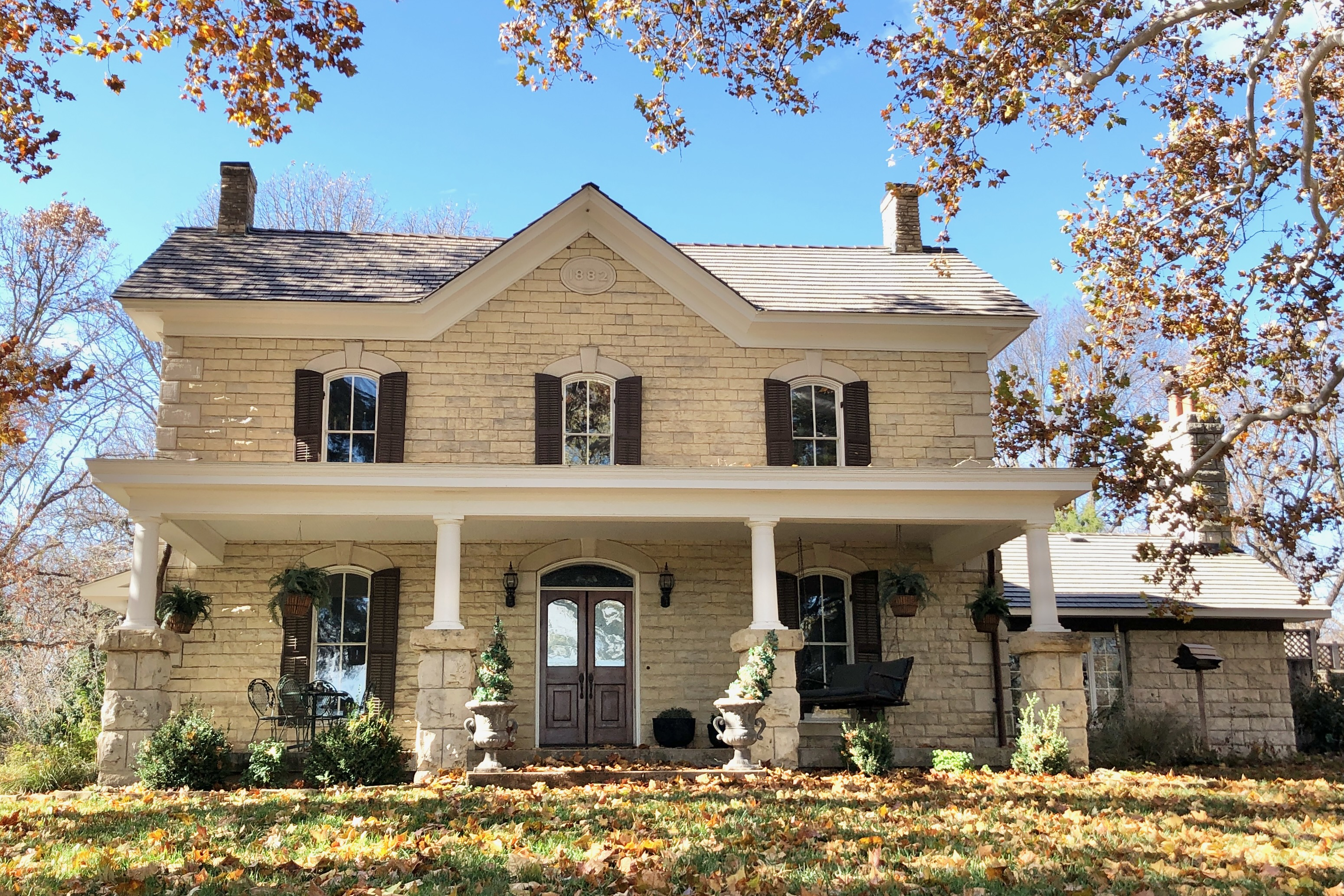
1881 Patrick Doyle House, 0.3 miles south of Florence (2022)

In 1802, Spain returned most of the land to France. In 1803, most of the land for modern day Kansas was acquired by the United States from France as part of the 828,000 square mile Louisiana Purchase for 2.83 cents per acre.

In 1806, Zebulon Pike led the Pike Expedition westward from St Louis, Missouri, of which part of their journey followed the Cottonwood River through Marion County near the future cities of Florence, Marion, and Durham.

In 1854, the Kansas Territory was organized, then in 1861 Kansas became the 34th U.S. state. In 1855, Marion County was established within the Kansas Territory, which included the land for modern day Florence.

The first settlers in Marion County located on Doyle Creek, near the site of Florence. They were Moses Shane, who came in 1858, and whose death the next year was the first in the county; Patrick Doyle, in 1859, for whom Doyle Creek and Township were named, and a family by the name of Welsh, in which occurred the first birth in the county in August 1859. A post office existed in Doyle from November 26, 1866 to March 13, 1871.

The Florence Town Company was a group of men who learned of the proposed route of the Atchison, Topeka and Santa Fe Railway, extended from Emporia, who decided on a town site where the railroad would cross the Cottonwood River. On September 23, 1870, there was announcement in The Emporia News about a new town named "Florence" at the mouth of Doyle Creek. The Florence Town Company was formed on December 1, 1870, with Samuel J. Crawford as the president. Previously, Crawford was the 3rd governor of Kansas from 1865 to 1868. He named the town, Florence, in honor of his daughter, Miss Florence Crawford of Topeka. The post office moved from Doyle to Florence on March 13, 1871.

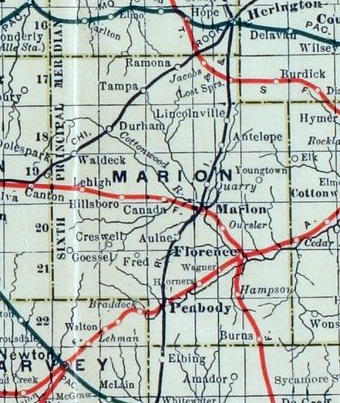
1915 railroad map of Marion County

In 1871, the Atchison, Topeka and Santa Fe Railway extended a main line from Emporia through Florence to Newton. In 1996, it merged with Burlington Northern Railroad and renamed to the BNSF Railway. The Santa Fe depot building still exists, but has been closed for decades. Most locals still refer to this railroad as the "Santa Fe".

In 1877, the Florence, El Dorado, and Walnut Valley Railroad Company built a branch line from Florence to El Dorado, in 1881 it was extended to Douglass, and later to Arkansas City. The line was leased and operated by the Atchison, Topeka and Santa Fe Railway. The line from Florence to El Dorado was abandoned in 1942. The original branch line connected Florence, Burns, De Graff, El Dorado, Augusta, Douglass, Rock, Akron, Winfield and Arkansas City.

As early as 1875, city leaders of Marion held a meeting to consider a branch railroad from Florence. In 1878, the Marion and McPherson Railway Company was chartered. In 1879, a branch line was built from Florence to McPherson; in 1880 it was extended to Lyons and in 1881 was extended to Ellinwood. The line was leased and operated by the Atchison, Topeka and Santa Fe Railway. The line from Florence to Marion was abandoned in 1968. In 1992, the line from Marion to McPherson was sold to Central Kansas Railway. In 1993, after heavy flood damage, the line from Marion to McPherson was abandoned. The original branch line connected Florence, Marion, Canada, Hillsboro, Lehigh, Canton, Galva, McPherson, Conway, Windom, Little River, Mitchell, Lyons, Chase and Ellinwood.

In 1877, Fred Harvey, an entrepreneur who is credited with establishing the first restaurant chain in the United States, bought the Clifton Hotel near the Florence railroad station for $5,370. Harvey redecorated the hotel and early in 1878, the second Harvey House Restaurant opened in Florence - the first Harvey House to offer sleeping rooms in addition to a restaurant.

=== 20th century ===
There have been numerous floods during the early history of Florence. In June and July 1951, due to heavy rains, rivers and streams flooded numerous cities in Kansas, including Florence. Many reservoirs and levees were built in Kansas as part of a response to the Great Flood of 1951. From 1964 to 1968, the Marion Reservoir was constructed north-west of Marion. Downstream from the Marion Reservoir, levees were built in low-lying areas of Marion and Florence.

== Geography ==
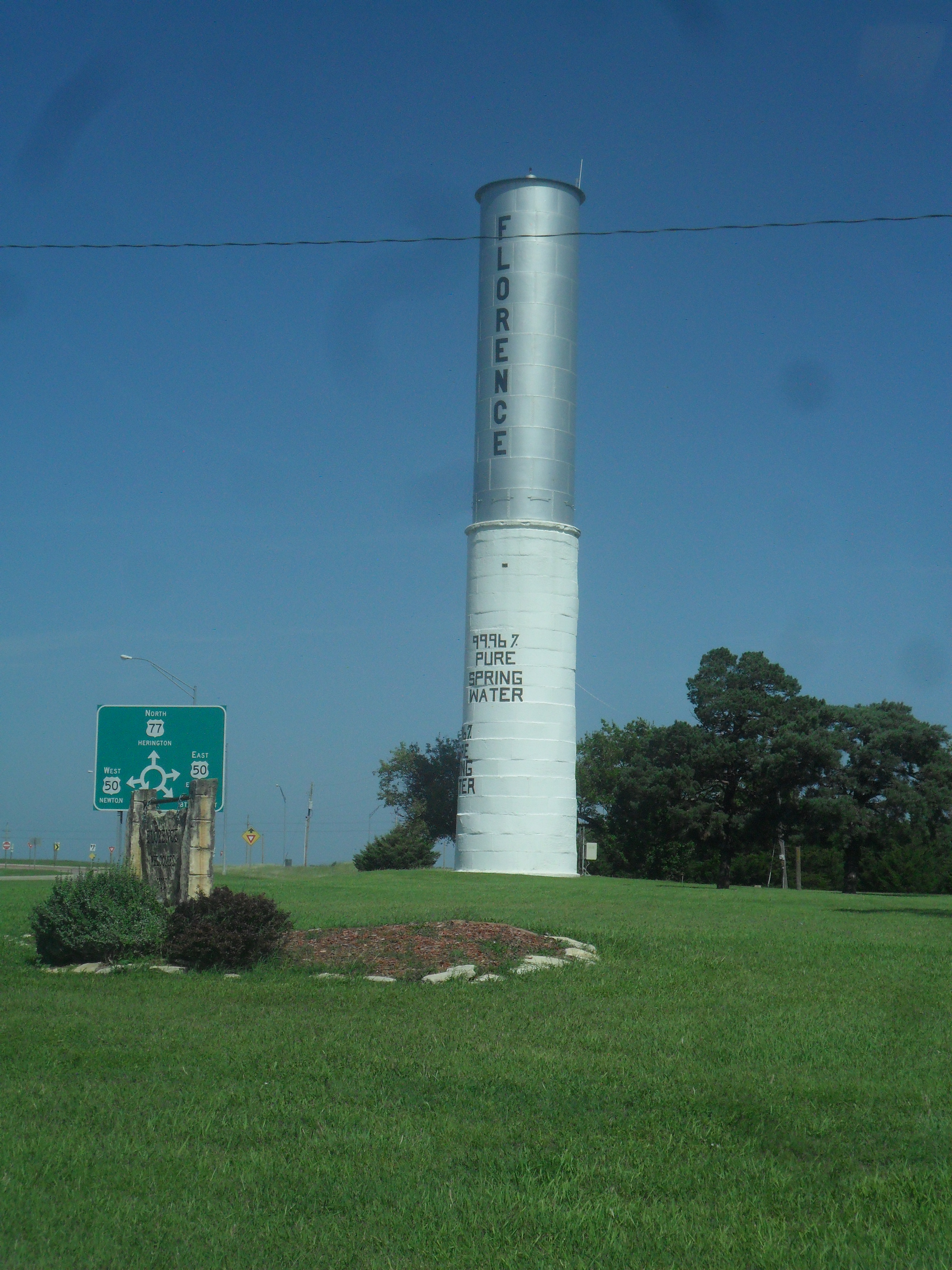
1887 Florence Water Tower (2018)

According to the United States Census Bureau, the city has a total area of 0.77 square miles (1.99 km^{2}), all land.

=== Climate ===
The climate in this area is characterized by hot, humid summers and generally cold, chilly winters with snowfall.

Climate data for Florence, Kansas (1991-2020, extremes 1950-2008)
Month	Jan	Feb	Mar	Apr	May	Jun	Jul	Aug	Sep	Oct	Nov	Dec	Year
Record high °F (°C)	76 (24)	82 (28)	91 (33)	95 (35)	101 (38)	112 (44)	115 (46)	111 (44)	109 (43)	97 (36)	88 (31)	78 (26)	115 (46)
Mean daily maximum °F (°C)	42.0 (5.6)	47.4 (8.6)	57.4 (14.1)	67.0 (19.4)	76.1 (24.5)	84.9 (29.4)	90.5 (32.5)	88.7 (31.5)	82.5 (28.1)	70.6 (21.4)	56.2 (13.4)	44.4 (6.9)	67.3 (19.6)
Daily mean °F (°C)	30.2 (−1.0)	34.6 (1.4)	44.3 (6.8)	53.6 (12.0)	64.0 (17.8)	73.8 (23.2)	79.0 (26.1)	77.0 (25.0)	69.2 (20.7)	57.0 (13.9)	43.6 (6.4)	33.0 (0.6)	54.9 (12.7)
Mean daily minimum °F (°C)	18.4 (−7.6)	21.7 (−5.7)	31.3 (−0.4)	40.2 (4.6)	52.0 (11.1)	62.7 (17.1)	67.5 (19.7)	65.4 (18.6)	55.8 (13.2)	43.4 (6.3)	31.0 (−0.6)	21.5 (−5.8)	42.6 (5.9)
Record low °F (°C)	−17 (−27)	−20 (−29)	−6 (−21)	12 (−11)	27 (−3)	40 (4)	45 (7)	45 (7)	24 (−4)	10 (−12)	−9 (−23)	−22 (−30)	−22 (−30)
Average precipitation inches (mm)	0.78 (20)	1.29 (33)	2.21 (56)	2.95 (75)	5.20 (132)	4.86 (123)	3.78 (96)	4.58 (116)	3.39 (86)	2.57 (65)	1.50 (38)	1.21 (31)	34.32 (871)
Average snowfall inches (cm)	2.3 (5.8)	3.0 (7.6)	0.5 (1.3)	0.0 (0.0)	0.0 (0.0)	0.0 (0.0)	0.0 (0.0)	0.0 (0.0)	0.0 (0.0)	trace	0.5 (1.3)	2.4 (6.1)	8.7 (22.1)
Average precipitation days (≥ 0.01 in)	2.5	3.1	5.0	5.4	7.6	7.2	6.5	5.2	5.3	4.7	3.1	3.3	58.9
Source: NOAA (snow 1980-2009)

== Area events ==
- Florence Labor Day Celebration, 76th annual in 2013.
- Florence High School Alumni Banquet, 117th annual in 2013, Memorial Day Weekend
- Harvey House Picnic, 15th annual in June 2013.
- Tour de Florence, mountain bike tour of the Flint Hills area around Florence, held in October.

== Area attractions ==
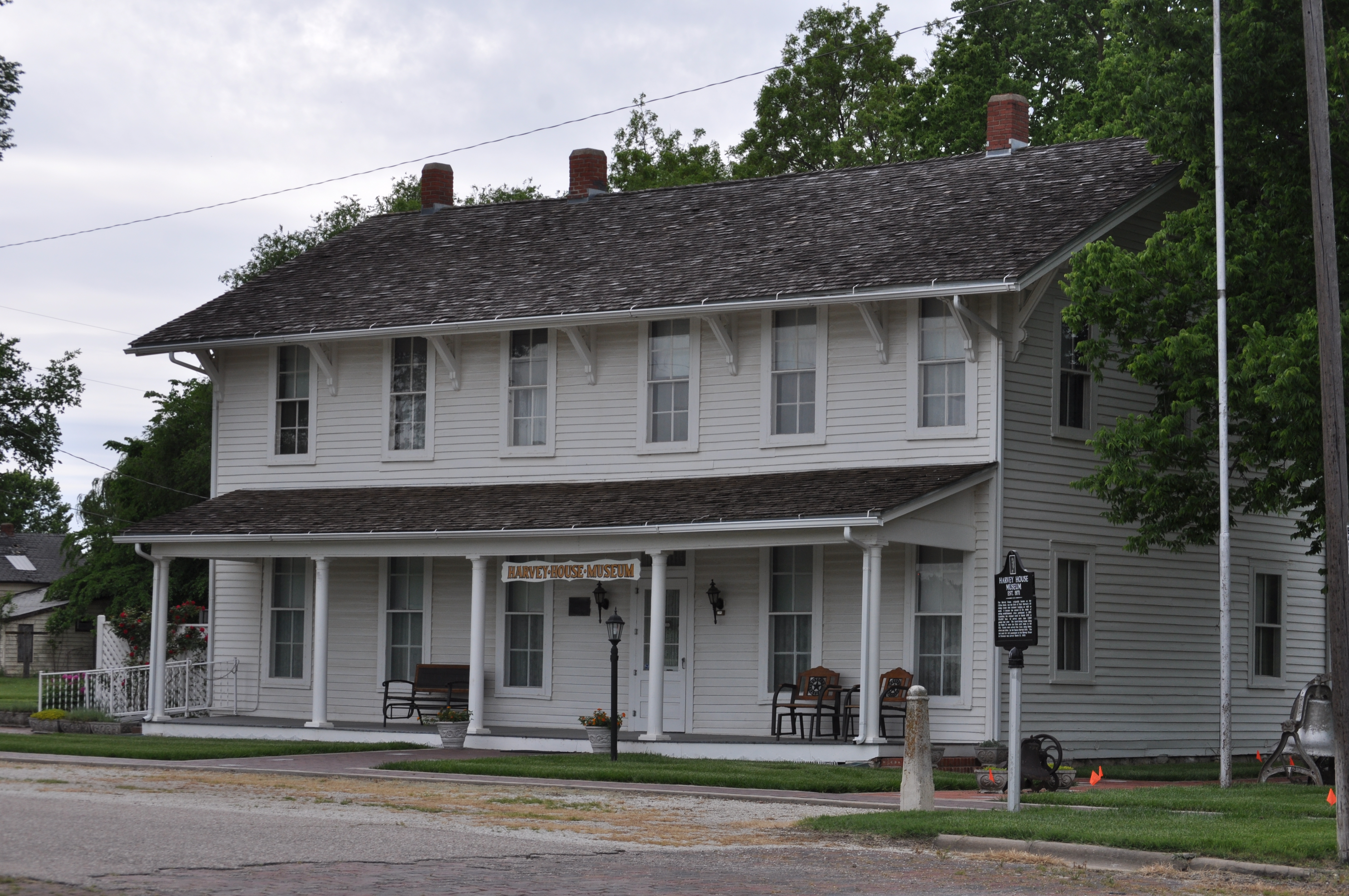
1876 Harvey House restaurant and hotel museum in Florence (2016)

Florence has five buildings listed on the National Register of Historic Places (NRHP).

- 1876 Harvey House (NRHP), 221 North Marion Street. Part of the first Fred Harvey House, of the Fred Harvey Company, which stood south of the Santa Fe railroad tracks until the early 1900s. The existing structure was the original part of the Clifton Hotel that was erected to serve passengers of the Atchison, Topeka and Santa Fe Railway as a permanent eating station and hotel for passengers. It was the first Harvey House to provide sleeping facilities.
- 1881 Doyle Place (NRHP), 0.3 miles (0.48 km) south of railroad track on Main Street. The house is a fine example of Italian Villa style and built from local quarried stone. The original owner, Patrick Doyle, was the source of the Doyle creek and township names. Not open to public.
- 1896 Bichet School (NRHP), 3 miles (4.8 km) east on US-50 then 0.1 miles (0.16 km) north on Bluestem Road. The school has a vernacular architecture built from local quarried stone. It was built to school French speaking immigrant children from a French settlement east of Florence that was settled from 1857 to 1885 by more than 60 families. Not open to public.
- 190x Florence Atchison, Topeka, & Santa Fe Depot (closed). Located at 38°14′20.1″N 96°55′39.5″W, which is north of the railroad tracks and south of the flood control dike. Not open to public.
- 1887 Florence Water Tower (NRHP), 525 West 5th Street. Unique example of late 19th-century water tower constructed of local materials.
- 1949 Florence City Springs Pump House, 1.25 miles (2.01 km) north. Not open to public.
- Florence Opera House (NRHP). Southwestern corner of 5th and Main Streets.

== Films and TV ==
- Feasting on Asphalt, 2006, season 1 episode 3 titled "High Plains Feaster", 7.5 minutes of video while Alton Brown visited the Spring Fling event and Harvey House in Florence.
- Mary White, 1977, scenes from this TV movie about the daughter of Kansas journalist William Allen White, were filmed in Florence.

== Demographics ==
Historical population
Census	Pop.	Note	%±
1880	954		—
1890	1,229		28.8%
1900	1,178		−4.1%
1910	1,168		−0.8%
1920	1,517		29.9%
1930	1,493		−1.6%
1940	1,329		−11.0%
1950	1,009		−24.1%
1960	853		−15.5%
1970	777		−8.9%
1980	729		−6.2%
1990	636		−12.8%
2000	671		5.5%
2010	465		−30.7%
2020	394		−15.3%
U.S. Decennial Census

=== 2020 census ===
The 2020 United States census counted 394 people, 189 households, and 95 families in Florence. The population density was 514.4 per square mile (198.6/km^{2}). There were 262 housing units at an average density of 342.0 per square mile (132.1/km^{2}). The racial makeup was 91.37% (360) white or European American (88.58% non-Hispanic white), 0.25% (1) black or African-American, 0.0% (0) Native American or Alaska Native, 0.0% (0) Asian, 0.51% (2) Pacific Islander or Native Hawaiian, 2.03% (8) from other races, and 5.84% (23) from two or more races. Hispanic or Latino of any race was 5.08% (20) of the population.

Of the 189 households, 21.2% had children under the age of 18; 33.3% were married couples living together; 33.3% had a female householder with no spouse or partner present. 40.7% of households consisted of individuals and 20.6% had someone living alone who was 65 years of age or older. The average household size was 2.2 and the average family size was 2.8. The percent of those with a bachelor's degree or higher was estimated to be 19.3% of the population.

21.6% of the population was under the age of 18, 5.8% from 18 to 24, 14.2% from 25 to 44, 34.5% from 45 to 64, and 23.9% who were 65 years of age or older. The median age was 50.6 years. For every 100 females, there were 111.8 males. For every 100 females ages 18 and older, there were 108.8 males.

The 2016–2020 5-year American Community Survey estimates show that the median household income was $35,833 (with a margin of error of +/- $13,378) and the median family income was $63,056 (+/- $14,285). Females had a median income of $12,500 (+/- $6,590). The median income for those above 16 years old was $15,852 (+/- $5,981). Approximately, 10.1% of families and 15.1% of the population were below the poverty line, including 18.2% of those under the age of 18 and 6.4% of those ages 65 or over.

=== 2010 census ===
As of the census of 2010, there were 465 people, 216 households, and 118 families residing in the city. The population density was 603.9 inhabitants per square mile (233.2/km^{2}). There were 279 housing units at an average density of 362.3 per square mile (139.9/km^{2}). The racial makeup of the city was 95.1% White, 0.6% African American, 0.6% Native American, 0.2% Asian, 0.2% from other races, and 3.2% from two or more races. Hispanic or Latino of any race were 3.4% of the population.

There were 216 households, of which 24.1% had children under the age of 18 living with them, 42.6% were married couples living together, 6.9% had a female householder with no husband present, 5.1% had a male householder with no wife present, and 45.4% were non-families. 39.8% of all households were made up of individuals, and 17.2% had someone living alone who was 65 years of age or older. The average household size was 2.15 and the average family size was 2.87.

The median age in the city was 46.1 years. 21.7% of residents were under the age of 18; 6.7% were between the ages of 18 and 24; 20.3% were from 25 to 44; 32.2% were from 45 to 64; and 19.1% were 65 years of age or older. The gender makeup of the city was 50.3% male and 49.7% female.

== Government ==
The Florence government consists of a mayor and four council members. The council meets the 1st and 3rd Monday of each month at 6:30PM.

- City Hall and Police Department, 511 N Main St.
- Fire Department.
- U.S. Post Office, 302 N Main St.

== Education ==
=== Primary and secondary education ===
The community is served by Marion–Florence USD 408 public school district. Florence's schools have been closed and students attend schools in Marion. The high school is a member of T.E.E.N., a shared video teaching network between five area high schools. All students attend schools in Marion.

- Marion High School
- Marion Middle School.
- Marion Elementary School

Florence schools were closed through school unification. The Florence High School mascot was Florence Wildcats.

=== Library ===
The city is served by the Florence Public Library at 324 North Main Street. The library is a member of the North Central Kansas Libraries System.

== Media ==
=== Print ===
- Peabody Gazette-Bulletin, local newspaper for Burns, Florence, Peabody.
- Marion County Record, local newspaper for Marion.

== Infrastructure ==
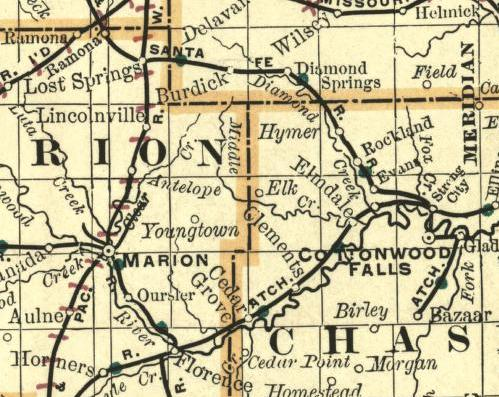
1893 railroad map

=== Transportation ===
Two highways cross through Florence: U.S. Routes 50 and 77. The intersection of these two highways had been known for numerous accidents in the past. In July 2003, two teen-agers died when they started crossing U.S. 50 and were struck by a semi-truck. By fall 2003, the Florence intersection was converted to a four-way stop with beacons and rumble strips. This solution lowered cross-traffic accidents, but increased rear-end collisions. To make the intersection safer, the Kansas Department of Transportation converted it into a 205-feet diameter roundabout, and completed it in September 2006.

The BNSF Railway passes through Florence and runs nearly parallel to U.S. Route 50.

=== Utilities ===
- Internet
  - Cable is provided by Vyve.
  - Wireless is provided by KwiKom.
  - Satellite is provided by HughesNet, StarBand, WildBlue.
- TV
  - Cable is provided by Vyve.
  - Satellite is provided by DirecTV, Dish Network.
  - Terrestrial is provided by regional digital TV stations.
- Electricity
  - Rural is provided by Flint Hills RECA.
- Water
  - Service is provided by City of Florence.
- Sewer
  - Service is provided by City of Florence.
- Trash
  - Service is provided by City of Florence.

== Notable people ==
- J. Ware Butterfield (b1838), Kansas House of Representatives, Lawyer.
- Charles Fuller (1825–1879), Kansas House of Representatives, Businessman, Farmer.
- J. K. McLean, Kansas House of Representatives.
- Sharon M. Savage, 1964 Miss Kansas (died during her reign in an auto accident near Peabody), Miss Marion County Fair.

== See also ==
- National Register of Historic Places listings in Marion County, Kansas
- Historical Maps of Marion County, Kansas
- La Junta Subdivision, branch of the BNSF Railway
