= Great Is Thy Faithfulness =

Christian hymn written in 1923

- by Thomas Chisholm
- Genre: Hymn
- Based on: Lamentations 3:23
- Meter: 11.10.11.10 with refrain
- Melody: "Faithfulness" by William M. Runyan
- Published: 1923 by Hope Publishing

"Great Is Thy Faithfulness" is a popular Christian hymn written by Thomas Chisholm (1866–1960) with music composed by William M. Runyan (1870–1957) in Baldwin City, Kansas, US.

The phrase "great is thy faithfulness" comes from the Old Testament Book of Lamentations 3:23. These exact words occur in both the King James Bible and the Revised Standard Version.

== History ==
Thomas O. Chisholm wrote the poem in 1923 about God's faithfulness over his lifetime. Chisholm sent the song to William Runyan in Kansas, who was affiliated with both the Moody Bible Institute and Hope Publishing Company. Runyan set the poem to music, and it was published that same year by Hope Publishing Company and became popular among church groups. The Biblical lyrics reference Lamentations 3:22-23. The song was exposed to wide audiences after becoming popular with Dr. William Henry Houghton of the Moody Bible Institute and Billy Graham, who used the song frequently on his international crusades. Since the middle 20th century, this hymn has been the university hymn of Cairn University in Pennsylvania. George Beverly Shea frequently performed this hymn for Graham's crusades.

Gaither Vocal Band recorded it for their 2007 album How Great Thou Art. Teea Goans recorded the hymn for her 2014 album Memories to Burn. Carrie Underwood, along with CeCe Winans performed it as a duet on Underwood's 2021 gospel album, My Savior.

In 2019, the song entered the public domain in the United States.

== Metre ==
"Great Is Thy Faithfulness" is written in dactylic 11.10.11.10 metre, which is rather rare amongst hymns.
