= Marion Municipal Airport (Kansas) =

Airport in Kansas, United States

- IATA: none; ICAO: none; FAA LID: 43K

Summary
- Airport type: Public
- Owner: City of Marion
- Serves: Marion, Kansas
- Elevation AMSL: 1,390 ft (420 m)
- Coordinates: 38°20′15″N 096°59′18″W

Map
- Location of airport in Kansas

Runways
Direction	Length		Surface
Direction	ft	m	Surface
17/35	2,573	784	Asphalt
3/21	2,745	837	Turf
13/31	2,722	830	Turf
18/36	2,310	704	Turf

Statistics (2009)
- Aircraft operations: 9,024
- Based aircraft: 17
- Source: Federal Aviation Administration

Marion Municipal Airport (FAA LID: 43K) is a city-owned, public-use airport located two nautical miles (4 km) southeast of the central business district of Marion, a city in Marion County, Kansas, United States.

== Facilities and aircraft ==
Marion Municipal Airport covers an area of 160 acres (65 ha) at an elevation of 1,390 feet (424 m) above mean sea level. It has one asphalt paved runway designated 17/35 which measures 2,573 by 40 feet (784 x 12 m); it also has three turf runways: 3/21 is 2,745 by 95 feet (837 x 29 m); 13/31 is 2,722 by 50 feet (830 x 15 m); 18/36 is 2,310 by 67 feet (704 x 20 m).

For the 12-month period ending November 19, 2009, the airport had 9,024 aircraft operations, an average of 24 per day: 99.7% general aviation and 0.3% military. At that time there were 17 aircraft based at this airport: 94% single-engine and 6% ultralight.

== See also ==
- List of airports in Kansas
