= Marion County Lake =

Lake and community in Kansas, US

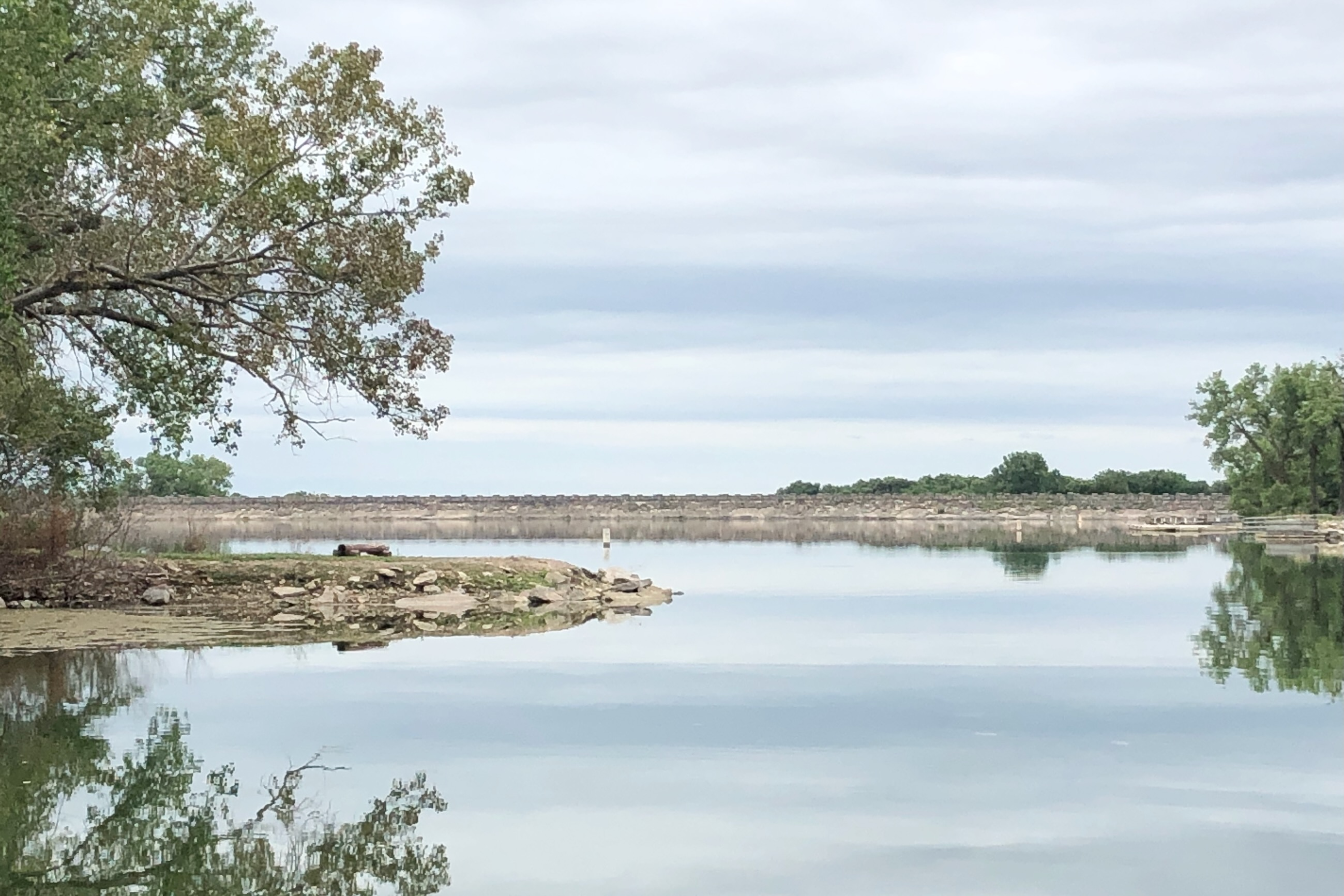
- Marion County Lake (2022)
- Interactive map of Marion County Lake
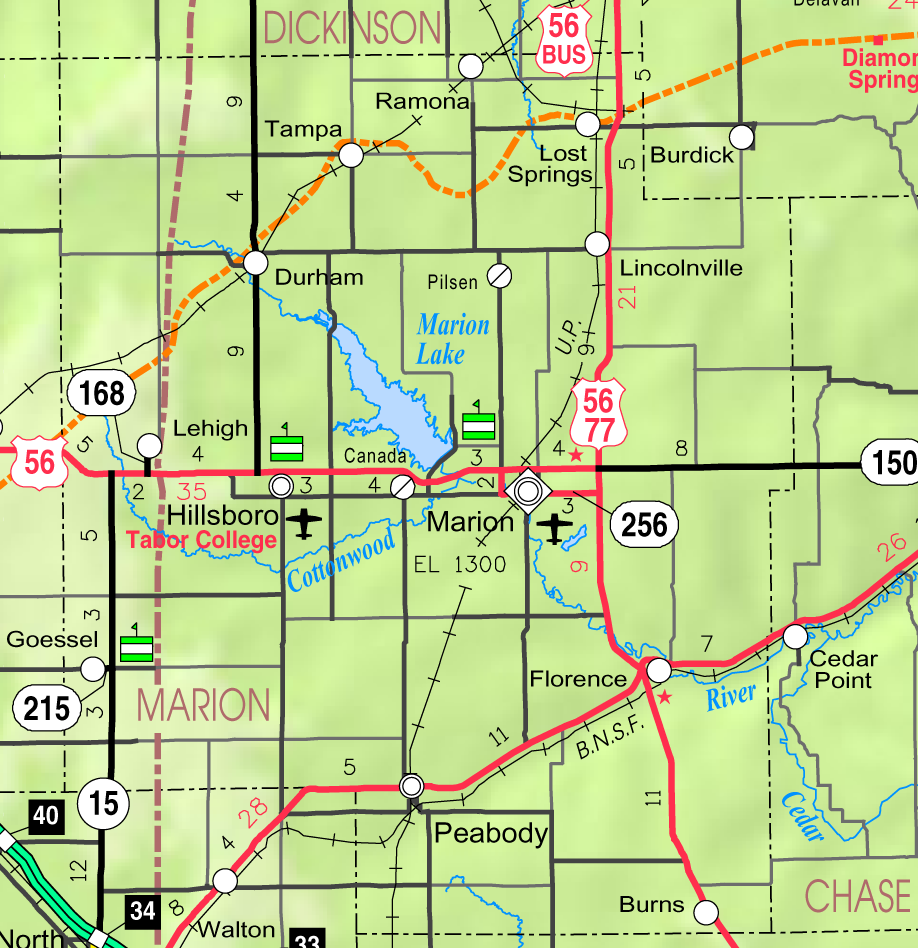
- KDOT map of Marion County (legend)
- Location: Marion County, Kansas
- Coordinates: 38°19′14″N 96°59′07″W
- Type: Lake
- Primary outflows: Cottonwood River
- Basin countries: United States
- Managing agency: Marion County
- Built: 1937; 89 years ago
- Surface area: 302.5 acres (1.224 km^{2}) park 153 acres (0.62 km^{2}) lake
- Max. depth: 40 feet (12 m) (1990)
- Surface elevation: 1,335 feet (407 m)
- Settlements: Marion
- Website: MarionCountyParkAndLake.com

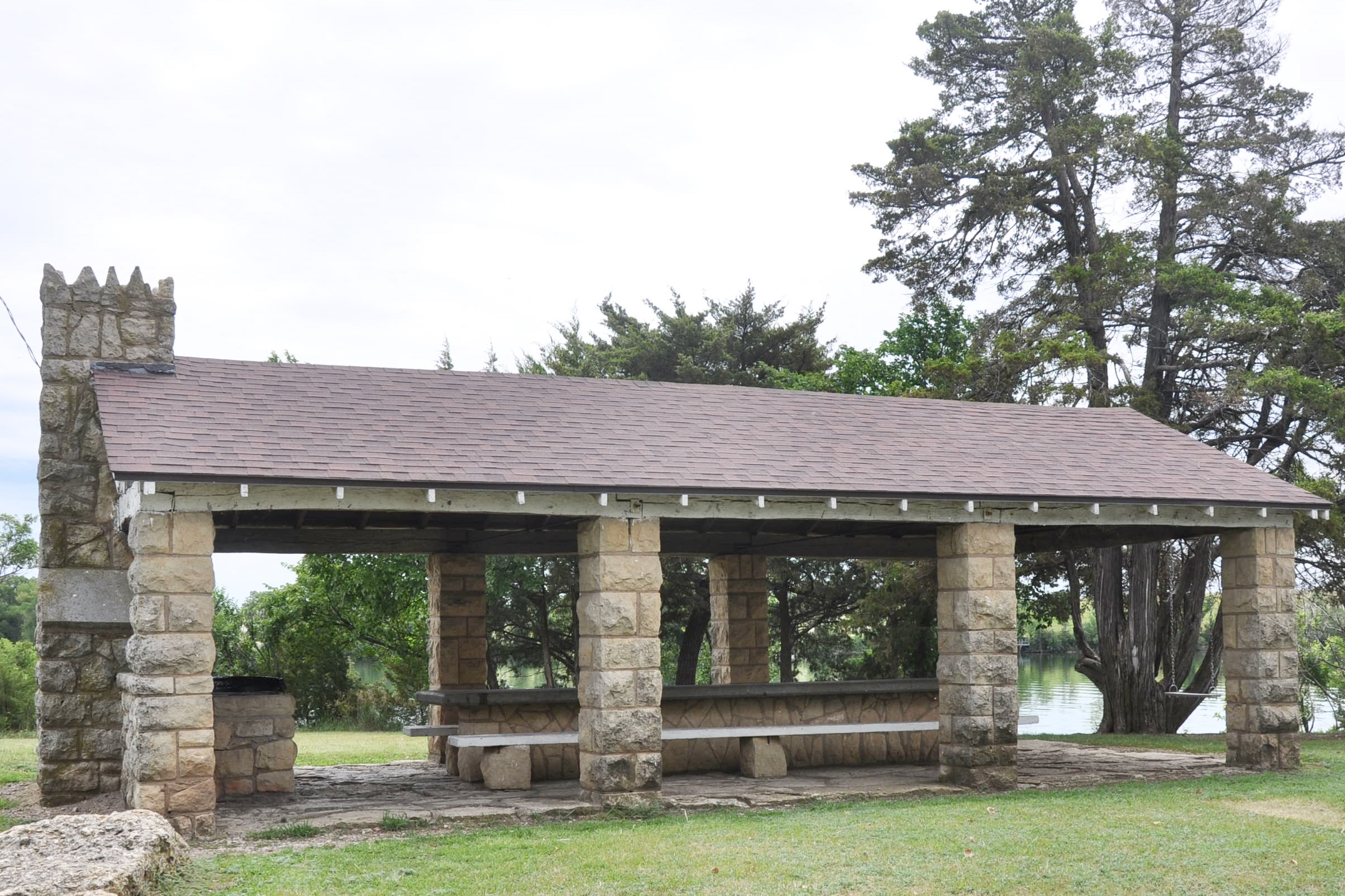
South shelter building (2022)

Marion County Lake is 1.5 miles (2.4 km) southeast of Marion, on the western edge of the Flint Hills region of Kansas, United States. An unincorporated residential community is around the lake. The much larger Marion Reservoir is located northwest of Marion.

== History ==
In 1854, the Kansas Territory was organized. In 1855, Marion County was established. In 1860, the city of Marion Centre was founded, later renamed Marion. In 1861, Kansas became the 34th U.S. state. In 1865, Marion became the county seat.

President Franklin D. Roosevelt's New Deal program provided nationwide relief from the Great Depression, by funding make-work job projects through agencies like the Civilian Conservation Corps (CCC) and the Works Progress Administration (WPA). In 1934, the New Deal's lakes and ponds work plan identified Marion County as an eligible drought area, and a project was conceived for public employment and water conservation.

The Kansas State Fish and Game Commission architected the dam, and Marion County Engineer James Meisner architected the park. His plan included designs and placements of stone structures, roads, and landscaping, stressing "permanency and timeless, simple designs". Reportedly, Meisner "believed the entire park could be built from materials close at hand, native rock with which roads could be surfaced, picturesque bridges constructed, and the whole park improved with no cost except labor". The two original water sources were runoff, and a small spring at the lake head. The county petitioned a public vote on the project to employ 300 men and 150 teams with New Deal funding of US$70,000 (equivalent to about $1,624,000 in 2025), which was approved 5,261 to 2,061.

On November 7, 1935, a CCC regiment was organized at Fort Riley for this project, and was staffed with Black veterans and juniors. On February 3, 1936, the regiment was dispatched by train to Marion to build the dam using mules and a steam shovel. On March 21, 1936, lake construction began with supervision by E. C. McBurney of the Soil Conservation Service (SCS), and construction by the CCC regiment. The park was built by the WPA and the Kansas Emergency Relief Committee (KERC).

Marion's population of 2,000 included only approximately eight black people, so the lake project was considered a feat of interracial collaboration, antedating desegregation. The 1937 yearbook of the Missouri and Kansas CCC District stated: "Ushered into a community unfamiliar with colored people, proved a colossal achievement for the company, their race, and the CCC. The surrounding populace soon realized these men were well disciplined and unusually civil." The Marion County Record reported for three years on the high standards of the entire regiment and of the community's hospitality. The regiment reportedly participated in all national and local events, holidays, and fighting one farmhouse fire.

The project was reportedly constantly visited or inspected by many federal relief agencies and the army, with several dignitary receptions. On October 15, 1936, the regiment was quickly diverted from the project into marching bugle corps formation for an impromptu reception of President Franklin D. Roosevelt and First Lady Eleanor Roosevelt.

In 1937, Marion County Lake was essentially completed on schedule, and the construction crew attributed the ongoing severe drought as a "blessing". By March 1938, the dam was functionally finished except its road, and the picnic facilities were in use that year. The lake began to fill rapidly with record rainfall, with one event of 6 inches (150 mm). May 26, 1940, was the day of dedication with 9,599 registered visitors, 1,985 fishermen, and cars from 35 counties and eight states. It was a "great success" with water depth at the dam of 35 feet (11 m), and because the lake had been stocked for three years.

In 1990, the park area was recorded still at its original 302.5 acres (122.4 ha), of which the lake was 153 acres (62 ha) and maximum depth of 40 feet (12 m).

In 2002, the facility was listed on the National Register of Historic Places (NRHP) for its historical association with the CCC, WPA, and KERC.

In 2012, an event at the park set the Guinness World Record for the "most people roasting marshmallows at once", at 1,272 people.

== Education ==
The community is served by Marion–Florence USD 408 public school district.

== See also ==
- List of lakes, reservoirs, and dams in Kansas
- List of rivers of Kansas
