= List of Kansas railroads =

The following railroads operate in the U.S. state of Kansas.

== Common freight carriers ==
- Blackwell Northern Gateway Railroad (BNG)
- Blue Rapids Railway (BRRY)
- Boot Hill and Western Railway (BHWY)
- BNSF Railway (BNSF)
- Cimarron Valley Railroad (CVR)
- Colorado Pacific Railroad (CXR)
- Garden City Western Railway (GCW)
- Kansas City Southern Railway (KCS)
- Kansas City Terminal Railway (KCT)
- Kansas and Oklahoma Railroad (KO)
- Kaw River Railroad (KAW)
- Kyle Railroad (KYLE)
- Missouri and Northern Arkansas Railroad (MNA)
- South Kansas and Oklahoma Railroad (SKOL)
  - Operates the Kansas Eastern Railroad (KE)
- Union Pacific Railroad (UP)
  - Operates the Blue Rapids Railway and Wichita Terminal Association
- V&S Railway (VSR)
- Wichita Union Terminal Railway (WUT)

== Passenger carriers ==
- Abilene and Smoky Valley Railroad
- Amtrak (AMTK)
- Ottawa Northern Railroad

== Private ==
- New Century AirCenter Railroad

== Defunct railroads ==
During World War II, less popular routes were reclaimed by the war effort for the metal rails, because of a shortage of materials during those years.

Name	Mark	System (Note: This is one or more of the Class I railroads that the railroad became part of, if any.)	From	To	Successor	Notes
Anthony and Northern Railway	AN&N		1912	1919	Wichita Northwestern Railway	
Arkansas, Kansas and Colorado Railway		RI	1887	1888	Chicago, Kansas and Nebraska Railway	
Arkansas River and Western Railroad		ATSF	1885	1886	Chicago, Kansas and Western Railroad	
Atchison, Colorado and Pacific Railroad		MP	1879	1898	Atchison, Colorado and Pacific Railway	
Atchison, Colorado and Pacific Railway		MP	1898	1899	Central Branch Railway	
Atchison and Denver Railway		MP	1878	1879	Atchison, Colorado and Pacific Railroad	
Atchison and Eastern Bridge Company			1898			
Atchison, Jewell County and Western Railroad		MP	1879	1898	Atchison, Jewell County and Western Railway	
Atchison, Jewell County and Western Railway		MP	1898	1899	Central Branch Railway	
Atchison and Nebraska Railroad		CB&Q	1869	1908	Chicago, Burlington and Quincy Railroad	
Atchison and Nebraska City Railroad		CB&Q	1865	1869	Atchison and Nebraska Railroad	
Atchison and Pike's Peak Railroad		MP	1859	1867	Central Branch Union Pacific Railroad	
Atchison, Republican Valley and Pacific Railway		MP	1878	1879	Atchison, Colorado and Pacific Railroad	
Atchison, St. Joseph and Northern Railroad		RI	1879	1886	Chicago, Kansas and Nebraska Railway	
Atchison, Solomon Valley and Denver Railway		MP	1877	1879	Atchison, Colorado and Pacific Railroad	
Atchison and Topeka Railroad		ATSF	1859	1863	Atchison, Topeka and Santa Fe Railroad	
Atchison, Topeka and Santa Fe Railroad		ATSF	1863	1895	Atchison, Topeka and Santa Fe Railway	
Atchison, Topeka and Santa Fe Railway	ATSF	ATSF	1895	1996	Burlington Northern and Santa Fe Railway	
Atchison Union Depot and Railroad Company		ATSF/ CB&Q/ MP/ RI	1878	1968	N/A	
Atlantic and Pacific Railroad		SLSF	1872	1875	N/A	Leased the Pacific Railroad
Baldwin City & Southern Railroad			2019	2023	Ottawa Northern Railroad	
Barton County and Santa Fe Railway		ATSF	1917	1942	Atchison, Topeka and Santa Fe Railway	
Beaver Valley Railroad		CB&Q	1887	1908	Chicago, Burlington and Quincy Railroad	
Blackwell and Northern Railway	BNR		2000	2006	Blackwell Northern Gateway Railroad	
Blue Valley Railway		UP	1886	1887	Omaha and Republican Valley Railway	
Burlingame and Northwestern Railway		ATSF	1898	1899	Atchison, Topeka and Santa Fe Railway	
Burlington, Kansas and Southwestern Railroad		CB&Q	1886	1886	Republican Valley, Kansas and Southwestern Railroad	
Burlington Northern Inc.	BN		1970	1981	Burlington Northern Railroad	
Burlington Northern Railroad	BN		1981	1996	Burlington Northern and Santa Fe Railway	
Cadillac and Lake City Railway	CLK		1981	1984	Kyle Railroad	
Central Branch Railway		MP	1899	1909	Missouri Pacific Railway	
Central Branch Union Pacific Railroad		MP	1867	1898	Central Branch Union Pacific Railway	
Central Branch Union Pacific Railway		MP	1898	1899	Central Branch Railway	
Central Kansas Railway	CKRY		1993	2001	Kansas and Oklahoma Railroad	
Cherokee and Memphis Railroad		SLSF	1882	1882	Kansas and Missouri Railroad	
Chicago, Burlington and Quincy Railroad	CB&Q	CB&Q	1880	1970	Burlington Northern Inc.	
Chicago, Burlington and Quincy Railway		CB&Q	1901	1907	N/A	Leased the Chicago, Burlington and Quincy Railroad
Chicago, Caldwell and Southern Railway		RI	1886	1887	Chicago, Kansas and Nebraska Railway	
Chicago Great Western Railroad	CGW	CGW	1909	1941	Chicago Great Western Railway	
Chicago Great Western Railway	CGW	CGW	1940	1968	Chicago and North Western Railway	
Chicago Great Western Railway		CGW	1892	1909	Chicago Great Western Railroad	
Chicago, Iowa and Kansas Railroad		CB&Q	1883	1884	Chicago, Nebraska and Kansas Railroad	
Chicago, Kansas and Nebraska Railway		RI	1886	1891	Chicago, Rock Island and Pacific Railway	
Chicago, Kansas and Western Railroad		ATSF	1886	1901	Atchison, Topeka and Santa Fe Railway	
Chicago, Kansas and Western Railway		ATSF	1885	1886	Chicago, Kansas and Western Railroad	
Chicago, Nebraska and Kansas Railroad		CB&Q	1884	1908	Chicago, Burlington and Quincy Railroad	
Chicago and North Western Railway	CNW	CNW	1968	1972	Chicago and North Western Transportation Company	
Chicago and North Western Transportation Company	CNW	CNW	1972	1986	N/A	
Chicago, Rock Island and Pacific Railroad		RI	1947	1980	Cadillac and Lake City Railway, Kyle Railroad, Oklahoma, Kansas and Texas Railroad, St. Louis Southwestern Railway, Wabash Valley Railroad	
Chicago, Rock Island and Pacific Railroad	RI, ROCK	RI	1878	1880	Chicago, Rock Island and Pacific Railway	
Chicago, Rock Island and Pacific Railway	RI	RI	1880	1948	Chicago, Rock Island and Pacific Railroad	
Chicago, St. Paul and Kansas City Railway		CGW	1891	1893	Chicago Great Western Railway	
Choctaw Northern Railroad		RI	1901	1902	Choctaw, Oklahoma and Gulf Railroad	
Choctaw, Oklahoma and Gulf Railroad		RI	1902	1936	N/A	
City Terminal Railway		CGW	1900	1905	Chicago Great Western Railway	
Colony, Neosho Falls and Western Railroad		ATSF	1885	1886	Chicago, Kansas and Western Railroad	
Colorado, Kansas and Oklahoma Railroad			1913	1917	N/A	
Council Grove, Osage City and Ottawa Railway		MP	1886	1891	Kansas and Colorado Pacific Railway	
Council Grove, Smoky Valley and Western Railway		MP	1886	1891	Kansas and Colorado Pacific Railway	
Cowley, Sumner and Fort Smith Railroad		ATSF	1878	1882	Wichita and Southwestern Railway	
Crawford County Railroad		ATSF	1884	1884	Kansas Southern Railway	
Denver, Enid and Gulf Railroad		ATSF	1907	1907	Eastern Oklahoma Railway	
Denver, Kansas and Gulf Railroad		ATSF	1905	1905	Denver, Kansas and Gulf Railway	
Denver, Kansas and Gulf Railway		ATSF	1905	1907	Denver, Enid and Gulf Railroad	
Denver, Memphis and Atlantic Railway		MP	1884	1891	Kansas and Colorado Pacific Railway	
Denver, Memphis and Atlantic Narrow Gauge Railway		MP	1883	1884	Denver, Memphis and Atlantic Railway	
Dodge City and Cimarron Valley Railway		ATSF	1911			Still exists as a nonoperating subsidiary of the BNSF Railway
Dodge City, Ford and Bucklin Railroad	DCFB		1989	2000	Boot Hill and Western Railway	
Dodge City, Montezuma and Trinidad Railway		RI	1887	1893	N/A	
Eastern Oklahoma Railway		ATSF	1899	1907	Atchison, Topeka and Santa Fe Railway	
Edgewater Connecting Railway		MP	1906	1923	Missouri Pacific Railroad	
Eldorado and Santa Fe Railway		ATSF	1922	1942	Atchison, Topeka and Santa Fe Railway	
Elk and Chatauqua Railroad		ATSF	1878	1882	Kansas City, Emporia and Southern Railway	
Ellsworth, McPherson, Newton and Southeastern Railway		MP	1884	1885	St. Louis, Fort Scott and Wichita Railroad	
Emporia and Eldorado Short Line Railroad		ATSF	1885	1886	Chicago, Kansas and Western Railroad	
Florence, El Dorado and Walnut Valley Railroad		ATSF	1877	1901	Atchison, Topeka and Santa Fe Railway	Florence, El Dorado, Augusta, Winfield, Arkansas City.
Fort Leavenworth Railroad		RI	1871	1889	Chicago, Rock Island and Pacific Railway	
Fort Scott and Allen County Railroad		MP	1870	1871	Fort Scott, Humboldt and Western Railway	
Fort Scott Belt Terminal Railway		MP	1889	1891	Fort Scott Central Railway	
Fort Scott and Carthage Railroad		SLSF	1881	1882	Kansas and Missouri Railroad	
Fort Scott Central Railway		MP	1891	1909	Missouri Pacific Railway	
Fort Scott and Eastern Railway		MP	1889	1891	Fort Scott Central Railway	
Fort Scott, Humboldt and Pacific Railway		MP	1871	1871	Fort Scott, Humboldt and Western Railway	
Fort Scott, Humboldt and Western Railway		MP	1871	1875	St. Louis, Fort Scott and Wichita Railroad	
Fort Scott, Iola and Western Railway		MKT	1901	1902	Missouri, Kansas and Texas Railway	
Fort Scott, South Eastern and Memphis Railroad		SLSF	1874	1888	Kansas City, Fort Scott and Springfield Railroad	
Fort Scott, South Eastern and Memphis Railway		SLSF	1874	1888	Kansas City, Fort Scott and Springfield Railroad	
Fort Scott and Southern Railway		MP	1889	1891	Fort Scott Central Railway	
Fort Scott, Wichita and Western Railway		MP	1887	1891	Kansas and Colorado Pacific Railway	
Galena, Frontenac and Northern Railway		ATSF		1908	Atchison, Topeka and Santa Fe Railway	
Garden City, Gulf and Northern Railroad		ATSF	1907			
Garden City Northern Railway			1989	1991	Garden City Western Railway	
Grouse Creek Railway		MP	1887	1891	Kansas and Colorado Pacific Railway	
Gueda Springs, Caldwell and Western Railroad		ATSF	1885	1886	St. Louis, Kansas and Southwestern Railroad	
Harper and Western Railroad		ATSF	1884	1885	Southern Kansas Railway	
Harvey County Railroad		ATSF	1880	1882	Wichita and Southwestern Railway	
Hutchinson and Northern Railway	HN		1912	2006	V&S Railway	
Hutchinson, Oklahoma and Gulf Railway		ATSF	1889	1889	Hutchinson and Southern Railroad	
Hutchinson and Southern Railroad		ATSF	1889	1898	Hutchinson and Southern Railway	
Hutchinson and Southern Railway		ATSF	1897	1899	Atchison, Topeka and Santa Fe Railway	
Independence and Southwestern Railroad		ATSF	1885	1886	Chicago, Kansas and Western Railroad	
Inter-State Railroad		MP	1885	1890	Interstate Railway	
Interstate Railway		MP	1890	1891	Kansas and Colorado Pacific Railway	
Joplin Railroad		SLSF	1875	1882	Joplin Railway	
Joplin Railway		SLSF	1882	1882	St. Louis and San Francisco Railway	
Joplin and Galena Railway		SLSF	1880	1882	Joplin Railway	
Junction City and Fort Kearney Railway		UP	1871	1899	Union Pacific Railroad	
Kanopolis and Kansas Central Railway		MP	1886	1909	Missouri Pacific Railway	
Kansas and Arkansas Valley Railroad		MP	1888	1890	Kansas and Arkansas Valley Railway	
Kansas and Arkansas Valley Railway		MP	1888	1909	St. Louis, Iron Mountain and Southern Railway	
Kansas Central Railroad		UP	1879	1897	Leavenworth, Kansas and Western Railway	
Kansas Central Railway		UP	1871	1879	Kansas Central Railroad	
Kansas City Belt Railroad			1885	1886	Kansas City Belt Railway	
Kansas City Belt Railway			1886	1910	Kansas City Terminal Railway	
Kansas City, Burlington and Santa Fe Railway		ATSF	1870	1881	Ottawa and Burlington Railroad	
Kansas City, Clinton and Springfield Railway		SLSF	1885	1928	St. Louis – San Francisco Railway	
Kansas City Connecting Railroad	KCC		1914	1983	N/A	
Kansas City Connecting Railway				1915	Kansas City Connecting Railroad	
Kansas City and Emporia Railroad		ATSF	1880	1885	Southern Kansas Railway	
Kansas City, Emporia and Southern Railroad		ATSF	1877	1882	Kansas City, Emporia and Southern Railway	
Kansas City, Emporia and Southern Railway		ATSF	1882	1901	Atchison, Topeka and Santa Fe Railway	
Missouri River, Fort Scott & Gulf Railroad		SLSF	1879	1888	Kansas City, Fort Scott and Springfield Railroad	
Kansas City, Fort Scott and Memphis Railroad		SLSF	1888	1901	Kansas City, Fort Scott and Memphis Railway	
Kansas City, Fort Scott and Memphis Railway		SLSF	1901	1928	St. Louis – San Francisco Railway	
Kansas City, Fort Scott and Springfield Railroad		SLSF	1888	1888	Kansas City, Fort Scott and Memphis Railroad	
Kansas City, Lawrence and Southern Railroad		ATSF	1879	1880	Kansas City, Lawrence and Southern Kansas Railroad	
Kansas City, Lawrence and Southern Kansas Railroad		ATSF	1880	1883	Southern Kansas Railway	
Kansas City, Lawrence and Wichita Railroad		UP	1889	1894	N/A	Leased the Lawrence and Emporia Railway
Kansas City, Leavenworth and Atchison Railway		MP	1880	1880	Missouri Pacific Railway	
Kansas City, Mexico and Orient Railroad		ATSF	1914	1925	Kansas City, Mexico and Orient Railway	
Kansas City, Mexico and Orient Railway		ATSF	1925	1941	Atchison, Topeka and Santa Fe Railway	
Kansas City, Mexico and Orient Railway		ATSF	1900	1914	Kansas City, Mexico and Orient Railroad	
Kansas City Northwestern Railroad			1917	1919	Kansas City Northwestern Railway	
Kansas City Northwestern Railroad		MP	1893	1910	Missouri Pacific Railway	
Kansas City Northwestern Railway			1925	1925	N/A	
Kansas City and Olathe Railroad		ATSF	1881	1883	Southern Kansas Railway	
Kansas City Outer Belt and Electric Railroad			1902	1922	Kansas and Missouri Railway and Terminal Company	
Kansas City and Pacific Railroad		MKT	1886	1899	Missouri, Kansas and Texas Railway	
Kansas City, Pittsburg and Gulf Railroad		KCS	1893	1900	Kansas City Southern Railway	
Kansas City, Pittsburg and Western Railroad		KCS	1892	1894	Kansas City, Pittsburg and Gulf Railroad	
Kansas City and Santa Fe Railroad		ATSF	1879	1879	Kansas City, Lawrence and Southern Railroad	
Kansas City and Santa Fe Railroad and Telegraph Company		ATSF	1868	1879	Kansas City and Santa Fe Railroad	
Kansas City and Southwestern Railroad		SLSF	1884	1897	St. Louis and San Francisco Railroad	
Kansas City and Southwestern Railway		MP	1884	1909	Missouri Pacific Railway	
Kansas City Suburban Belt Railroad		KCS	1895	1902	Kansas City Southern Railway	
Kansas City and Topeka Railway		RI	1887	1889	Chicago, Rock Island and Pacific Railway	
Kansas City, Topeka and Western Railroad		ATSF	1875	1899	Atchison, Topeka and Santa Fe Railway	
Kansas City, Wyandotte and Northwestern Railroad		MP	1887	1894	Kansas City Northwestern Railroad	
Kansas City, Wyandotte and Northwestern Railway		MP	1885	1887	Kansas City, Wyandotte and Northwestern Railroad	
Kansas–Colorado Railroad			1908	1911	Garden City Western Railway, Colorado-Kansas Railway	
Kansas and Colorado Railroad		MP	1883	1891	Kansas and Colorado Pacific Railway	
Kansas and Colorado Pacific Railway		MP	1891	1909	Missouri Pacific Railway	
Kansas Midland Railroad		SLSF	1900	1900	St. Louis and San Francisco Railroad	
Kansas Midland Railroad		ATSF	1873	1875	Kansas City, Topeka and Western Railroad	
Kansas Midland Railway		SLSF	1886	1900	Kansas Midland Railroad	
Kansas and Missouri Railroad		SLSF	1882	1888	Kansas City, Fort Scott and Springfield Railroad	
Kansas and Missouri Railway and Terminal Company	KM	KCS	1922	1992	Kansas City Southern Railway	
Kansas and Nebraska Railway of Kansas		UP	1876	1877	St. Joseph and Western Railroad	
Kansas, Nebraska and Dakota Railway		MP	1885	1891	Kansas and Colorado Pacific Railway	
Kansas and Neosho Valley Railroad		SLSF	1865	1868	Missouri River, Fort Scott & Gulf Railroad	
Kansas and Oklahoma Railroad			1931	1937	N/A	
Kansas and Oklahoma Railway			1919	1931	Kansas and Oklahoma Railroad	
Kansas, Oklahoma Central and South-western Railway		ATSF	1894	1900	Atchison, Topeka and Santa Fe Railway	
Kansas, Oklahoma and Gulf Railway	KOG	MP	1919	1963	Texas and Pacific Railway	
Kansas, Oklahoma and Texas Railway		ATSF	1885	1886	Chicago, Kansas and Western Railroad	
Kansas Pacific Railway		UP	1869	1880	Union Pacific Railway	
Kansas and Southeastern Railroad		ATSF	1897	1899	Atchison, Topeka and Santa Fe Railway	
Kansas Southern Railroad		ATSF	1883	1884	Kansas Southern Railway	
Kansas Southern Railway			2000	2002	N/A	Operated the V&S Railway
Kansas Southern Railway		ATSF	1884	1885	Southern Kansas Railway	
Kansas and Southern Railway			1899	1904	Kansas Southern and Gulf Railroad	
Kansas Southern and Gulf Railroad			1904	1914	Westmoreland Interurban Railroad	
Kansas Southwestern Railroad		ATSF	1898	1901	Kansas Southwestern Railway	successor not to be confused with the 1991 Kansas Southwestern Railway
Kansas Southwestern Railway	KSW		1991	2000	Kansas and Oklahoma Railroad	
Kansas Southwestern Railway		ATSF	1901	1985	N/A	not to be confused with the 1991 Kansas Southwestern Railway
Kansas Southwestern Railway		MP	1886	1909	Missouri Pacific Railway	not to be confused with the 1991 Kansas Southwestern Railway
Kansas and Southwestern Railway		UP	1879	1880	Salina and South Western Railway	
Kingman, Pratt and Western Railroad		ATSF	1885	1889	Wichita and Western Railway	
Kiowa, Chickasha, and Fort Smith Railway		ATSF	1899	1904	Eastern Oklahoma Railway	
Kiowa, Hardtner and Pacific Railroad		MP	1908	2002	N/A	
Labette and Sedalia Railway		MKT	1870	1870	Missouri, Kansas and Texas Railroad	
Lawrence and Carbondale Railway		UP	1871	1873	St. Louis, Lawrence and Denver Railroad	
Lawrence and Emporia Railway		UP	1881	1894	N/A	
Lawrence, Emporia and Southwestern Railway		UP	1887	1894	N/A	Leased the Lawrence and Emporia Railway
Lawrence and Galveston Railroad		ATSF	1879	1879	Kansas City, Lawrence and Southern Railroad	
Lawrence and Topeka Railroad		ATSF	1868	1875	Kansas City, Topeka and Western Railroad	
Leavenworth, Atchison and North Western Railroad		MP	1867	1880	Kansas City, Leavenworth and Atchison Railway	
Leavenworth Depot and Railroad Company		ATSF/ MP/ RI/ UP	1885	1968	N/A	
Leavenworth, Kansas and Western Railway		UP	1897	1908	Union Pacific Railroad	
Leavenworth, Lawrence and Fort Gibson Railroad		ATSF	1858	1866	Leavenworth, Lawrence and Galveston Railroad	
Leavenworth, Lawrence and Galveston Railroad		ATSF	1866	1878	Lawrence and Galveston Railroad	
Leavenworth, Northern and Southern Railway		ATSF	1885	1899	Atchison, Topeka and Western Railway	
Leavenworth and Olathe Railroad		MP	1886	1887	Kansas City, Wyandotte and Northwestern Railroad	
Leavenworth, Pawnee and Western Railroad		UP	1855	1863	Union Pacific Railway, Eastern Division	
Leavenworth and Platte County Bridge Company		CGW	1888	1892	Leavenworth Terminal Railway and Bridge Company	
Leavenworth Terminal Railway and Bridge Company		CGW	1892	1940	Chicago Great Western Railroad	
Leavenworth and Topeka Railroad			1918	1931	Leavenworth, Topeka and Western Railroad	
Leavenworth and Topeka Railway		ATSF/ UP	1899	1918	Leavenworth and Topeka Railroad	
Leavenworth, Topeka and South Western Railway		ATSF/ UP	1879	1899	Leavenworth and Topeka Railway	
Leavenworth, Topeka and Western Railroad			1931	1932	N/A	
Leroy and Caney Valley Air Line Railroad		MP	1885	1909	Missouri Pacific Railway	
Leroy and Western Railway		ATSF	1885	1886	Chicago, Kansas and Western Railroad	
Lincoln and Colorado Railway		UP	1887	1888	Union Pacific, Lincoln and Colorado Railway	
Manhattan, Alma and Burlingame Railway		ATSF	1872	1898	Burlingame and Northwestern Railway	
Manhattan and Blue Valley Railroad		UP	1879	1886	Blue Valley Railway	
Manhattan and Northwestern Railroad		UP	1871	1879	Manhattan and Blue Valley Railroad	
Marion Belt and Chingawasa Springs Railroad			1889	1893	N/A	Marion, Chingawasa Springs.
Marion and McPherson Railroad		ATSF	1877	1882	Marion and McPherson Railroad	
Marion and McPherson Railway		ATSF	1882	1901	Atchison, Topeka and Santa Fe Railway	Florence, Marion, McPherson, Lyons, Ellinwood.
Marion and McPherson Extension Railroad		ATSF	1878	1882	Marion and McPherson Railway	
Marysville and Blue Valley Railroad		UP	1879	1886	Blue Valley Railway	
Marysville or Palmetto and Roseport Railroad		UP	1857	1862	St. Joseph and Denver City Railroad	
McPherson, Texas and Gulf Railroad		ATSF	1887	1889	Hutchinson and Southern Railroad	
Memphis, Carthage and Northwestern Railroad		SLSF	1872	1875	Missouri and Western Railway	
Memphis and Ellsworth Narrow Gauge Railroad		SLSF	1876	1878	Memphis, Kansas and Colorado Railroad	
Memphis, Kansas and Colorado Railroad		SLSF	1877	1888	Kansas City, Fort Scott and Springfield Railroad	
Miami Mineral Belt Railroad		SLSF	1917	1950	St. Louis – San Francisco Railway	
Midland Railway			1982	2019	Baldwin City & Southern Railroad	
Midland Valley Railroad	MV	MP	1903	1967	Texas and Pacific Railway	
Missouri, Kansas and Northwestern Railroad		MKT	1900	1902	Missouri, Kansas and Texas Railway	
Missouri–Kansas–Texas Railroad	M-K-T, MKT	MKT	1923	1989	Missouri Pacific Railroad	
Missouri, Kansas and Texas Railroad		MKT	1870	1870	Missouri, Kansas and Texas Railway	
Missouri, Kansas and Texas Railway	MK&T	MKT	1870	1923	Missouri–Kansas–Texas Railroad	
Missouri, Oklahoma and Gulf Railroad		MP	1912	1927	Kansas, Oklahoma and Gulf Railway	
Missouri, Oklahoma and Gulf Railway		MP	1912	1919	Kansas, Oklahoma and Gulf Railway	
Missouri Pacific Railroad	MP	MP	1917	1997	Union Pacific Railroad	
Missouri Pacific Railway		MP	1876	1917	Kansas City Northwestern Railroad, Missouri Pacific Railroad	
Missouri Pacific Railway in Kansas		MP	1885	1891	Kansas and Colorado Pacific Railway	
Missouri Pacific Railway of Kansas		MP	1881	1882	Missouri Pacific Railway	
Missouri River Railroad		MP	1865	1880	Kansas City, Leavenworth and Atchison Railway	
Missouri River, Fort Scott & Gulf Railroad		SLSF	1868	1879	Kansas City, Fort Scott, and Gulf Railroad	
Missouri and Western Railway		SLSF	1875	1879	St. Louis and San Francisco Railway	
Montgomery County Railway		ATSF	1903	1903	Atchison, Topeka and Santa Fe Railway	
Nebraska, Kansas and Colorado RailNet			1996	2005	Nebraska Kansas Colorado Railway	
Nebraska, Topeka, Iola and Memphis Railroad		ATSF	1881	1884	Crawford County Railroad	
Neosho Valley and Holden Railway		MKT	1870	1870	Missouri, Kansas and Texas Railroad	
Nevada and Minden Railway of Kansas		MP	1885	1909	Missouri Pacific Railway	
Northeast Oklahoma Railroad	NEO	SLSF	1919	1967	St. Louis – San Francisco Railway	
Northern Kansas Railroad		UP	1866	1866	St. Joseph and Denver City Railroad	
Oakley and Colby Railway		UP	1885	1888	Union Pacific, Lincoln and Colorado Railway	
Oklahoma, Kansas and Texas Railroad	OKKT	MKT	1980	1989	Missouri–Kansas–Texas Railroad	
Omaha, Abilene and Wichita Railway		RI	1885	1886	Chicago, Kansas and Nebraska Railway	
Omaha and Republican Valley Railway		UP	1887	1898	Union Pacific Railroad	
Oswego and State Line Railroad		SLSF	1875	1875	Missouri and Western Railway	
Ottawa and Burlington Railroad		ATSF	1881	1883	Southern Kansas Railway	
Ottawa, Osage City and Council Grove Railroad		ATSF	1883	1886	Chicago, Kansas and Western Railroad	
Pacific Railroad		MP	1866	1876	Missouri Pacific Railway	
Pacific Railway in Kansas		MP	1887	1887	Pacific Railway in Nebraska	
Pacific Railway in Nebraska		MP	1887	1910	Missouri Pacific Railway	
Parsons and Pacific Railroad		MKT	1885	1887	Kansas City and Pacific Railroad	
Pawnee Valley and Denver Railroad		ATSF	1885	1886	Chicago, Kansas and Western Railroad	
Pittsburg and Columbus Railway		SLSF	1886	1926	St. Louis – San Francisco Railway	
Pittsburg, Fort Smith and Southern Railroad		KCS	1892	1894	Kansas City, Pittsburg and Gulf Railroad	
Pleasant Hill and De Soto Railroad		SLSF	1877	1885	Kansas City, Clinton and Springfield Railway	
Republican Valley Railroad		CB&Q	1878	1888	Chicago, Burlington and Quincy Railroad	
Republican Valley Railway		MP	1876	1879	Atchison, Colorado and Pacific Railroad	
Republican Valley, Kansas and Southwestern Railroad		CB&Q	1886	1908	Chicago, Burlington and Quincy Railroad	
Rich Hill Railroad		SLSF	1880	1888	Kansas City, Fort Scott and Springfield Railroad	
Rooks County Railroad		MP	1885	1909	Missouri Pacific Railway	
St. Joseph Bridge Building Company		UP	1870	1885	St. Joseph and Grand Island Railroad	
St. Joseph and Denver City Railroad		UP	1862	1876	Kansas and Nebraska Railway of Kansas, St. Joseph and Pacific Railroad	
St. Joseph and Grand Island Railroad		UP	1885	1887	St. Joseph, Hanover and Western Railway	
St. Joseph and Grand Island Railway	SJGI	UP	1897			
St. Joseph, Hanover and Western Railway		UP	1896	1897	St. Joseph and Grand Island Railway	
St. Joseph and Marysville Railroad		UP	1885	1885	St. Joseph and Grand Island Railroad	
St. Joseph and Pacific Railroad		UP	1876	1877	St. Joseph and Western Railroad	
St. Joseph and Topeka Railroad			1857	1878	N/A	
St. Joseph and Western Railroad		UP	1877	1885	St. Joseph and Marysville Railroad	
St. Louis and Emporia Railroad		MP	1881	1890	Interstate Railway	
St. Louis, Fort Scott and Wichita Railroad		MP	1880	1887	Fort Scott, Wichita and Western Railway	
St. Louis, Iron Mountain and Southern Railway		MP	1888	1917	Missouri Pacific Railroad	
St. Louis, Kansas and Southwestern Railroad		ATSF	1886	1899	Kansas Southwestern Railroad	
St. Louis, Lawrence and Denver Railroad		ATSF, SLSF, UP	1865	1874	St. Louis, Lawrence and Western Railroad	
St. Louis, Lawrence and Western Railroad		ATSF, SLSF, UP	1874	1877	Kansas City, Topeka and Western Railroad, Lawrence, Emporia and Southwestern Railway, Pleasant Hill and De Soto Railroad	
St. Louis and San Francisco Railroad		SLSF	1896	1915	St. Louis – San Francisco Railway	
St. Louis – San Francisco Railway	SLSF	SLSF	1916	1980	Burlington Northern Inc.	
St. Louis and San Francisco Railway		SLSF	1879	1896	St. Louis and San Francisco Railroad	
St. Louis Southwestern Railway	SSW	SP	1980	1997	Union Pacific Railroad	
St. Louis, Wichita and Western Railway		SLSF	1879	1882	St. Louis and San Francisco Railway	
Salina, Lincoln and Western Railway		UP	1885	1888	Union Pacific, Lincoln and Colorado Railway	
Salina Northern Railroad	SN	ATSF	1914	1924	Salina and Santa Fe Railway	
Salina and Santa Fe Railway		ATSF	1924	1942	Atchison, Topeka and Santa Fe Railway	
Salina and South Western Railway		UP	1880	1900	Union Pacific Railroad	
Salina and Southwestern Railway		UP	1878	1880	Salina and South Western Railway	
Salina, Sterling and El Paso Railroad		MP	1883	1891	Kansas and Colorado Pacific Railway	
Scott City Northern Railroad			1910	1913	Colorado, Kansas and Oklahoma Railroad	
Short Creek and Joplin Railroad		SLSF	1879	1888	Kansas City, Fort Scott and Springfield Railroad	
Solomon Railroad		UP	1877	1900	Union Pacific Railroad	
Southeast Kansas Railroad	SEKR		1987	1999	South Kansas and Oklahoma Railroad	
Southern Kansas Railroad		ATSF	1871	1879	Kansas City, Lawrence and Southern Railroad	
Southern Kansas Railway		ATSF	1883	1899	Atchison, Topeka and Santa Fe Railway	
Southern Kansas and Panhandle Railroad		ATSF	1886	1890	Chicago, Kansas and Western Railroad	
Southern Kansas and Western Railroad		ATSF	1879	1880	Kansas City, Lawrence and Southern Kansas Railroad	
Southwestern Mineral Railway		MKT	1894	1894	Missouri, Kansas and Texas Railway	
State Line, Oswego and Southern Kansas Railway		SLSF	1872	1872	Memphis, Carthage and Northwestern Railroad	
Sumner County Railroad		ATSF	1880	1880	Kansas City, Lawrence and Southern Kansas Railroad	
Texas and Pacific Railway		MP	1967	1976	Missouri Pacific Railroad	
Topeka and Northwestern Railroad		UP	1904	1908	Union Pacific Railroad	
Topeka, Salina and Western Railroad		MP	1880	1891	Kansas and Colorado Pacific Railway	
Union Pacific Railway		UP	1880	1898	Union Pacific Railroad	
Union Pacific Railway, Eastern Division		UP	1863	1869	Kansas Pacific Railway	
Union Pacific Railway, Southern Branch		MKT	1865	1870	Missouri, Kansas and Texas Railroad	
Union Pacific, Lincoln and Colorado Railway		UP	1888	1898	Union Pacific Railroad	
Union Terminal Railroad		KCS	1891	1902	Kansas City Southern Railway	
Verdigris Valley, Independence and Western Railroad		MP	1885	1891	Kansas and Colorado Pacific Railway	
Wabash Valley Railroad	WVRC		1981	1981	Kyle Railroad	
Walnut Valley and Colorado Railroad		ATSF	1885	1886	Chicago, Kansas and Western Railroad	
Waterville and Washington Railroad		MP	1876	1879	Atchison, Colorado and Pacific Railroad	
Watonga and Northwestern Railroad		RI	1900	1901	Choctaw and Northern Railroad	
Westmoreland Interurban Railroad			1914	1918	N/A	
Wichita and Colorado Railway		MP	1885	1891	Kansas and Colorado Pacific Railway	
Wichita, McPherson and Gulf Railroad		MP	1910	1911	Wichita and Midland Valley Railroad	
Wichita and Midland Valley Railroad		MP	1911	1929	Midland Valley Railroad	
Wichita Northwestern Railway	WNW		1919	1941	N/A	
Wichita and Southwestern Railroad		ATSF	1871	1882	Wichita and Southwestern Railway	
Wichita and Southwestern Railway		ATSF	1882	1901	Atchison, Topeka and Santa Fe Railway	
Wichita and Western Railroad		ATSF	1883	1889	Wichita and Western Railway	
Wichita and Western Railway		ATSF	1889	1898	Atchison, Topeka and Santa Fe Railway	

Electric

- Arkansas Valley Interurban Railway
- Hutchinson and Northern Railway (HN)
- Joplin–Pittsburg Railway
- Kansas City, Kaw Valley Railroad
- Kansas City, Kaw Valley and Western Railway (KV&W, KVW)
- Kansas City, Lawrence and Topeka Railway
- Kansas City-Leavenworth Railway
- Kansas City, Leavenworth and Western Railway
- Kansas City and Olathe Electric Railway
- Kansas City Public Service Company
- Kansas and Missouri Railway and Terminal Company
- Missouri and Kansas Interurban Railway
- Northeast Oklahoma Railroad (NEO)
- Southwest Missouri Railroad Company
- Union Electric Railway

Not completed

- Nebraska, Kansas and Southern Railway
