= Marion and McPherson Railroad =

Former short-line railroad in Kansas, US

The Marion and McPherson Railroad was a short-line railroad in central Kansas.

== History ==
As early as 1875, city leaders of Marion held a meeting to consider a branch railroad from Florence to Marion. In 1878, the Marion and McPherson Railway Company was chartered.

In 1879, a rail line was built from Florence to McPherson. In 1880, it was extended to Lyons, in 1881 it was extended to Ellinwood. In 1901, the line was leased and operated by the Atchison, Topeka and Santa Fe Railway, which used the name "Florence & Ellinwood Division" for it.

The line from Florence to Marion was abandoned in 1969. In 1992, the line from Marion to McPherson was sold to Central Kansas Railway. In 1993, after heavy flood damage, the line from Marion to McPherson was abandoned. In 2001, the railway from Lyons to 3 miles (5 kilometers) west of Conway was abandoned. In 2001, Kansas and Oklahoma Railroad (K&O) took over operations of Central Kansas Railway.

Currently, the remaining parts of the former Marion and McPherson Railroad that still exists is:

- Ellinwood to Lyons,
- 3 mi (5 km) west of Conway to 3 mi (5 km) east of McPherson.

== Stations ==
At a high-level, the railroad connected the primary cities of Ellinwood (west end), Lyons, McPherson, Marion, Florence (east end).

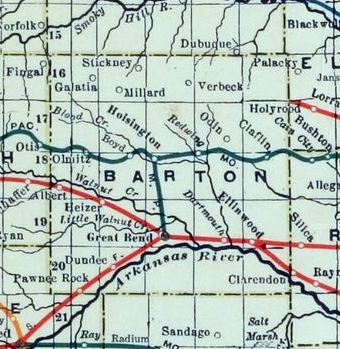
1915 Railroad Map of Barton County
- Ellinwood (west end)
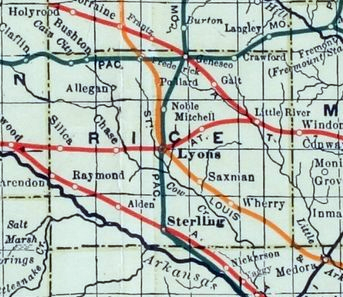
1915 Railroad Map of Rice County
- Silica
- Chase
- Lyons
- Mitchell
- Little River
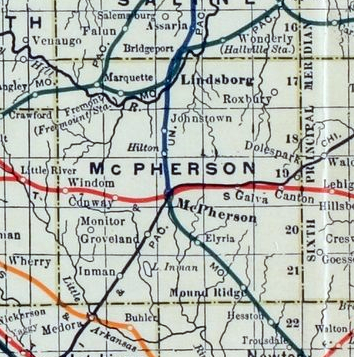
1915 Railroad Map of McPherson County
- Windom
- Conway
- McPerson
- Galva
- Canton
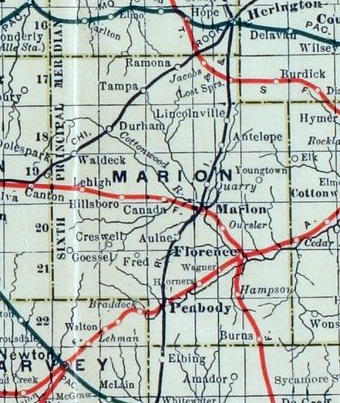
1915 Railroad Map of Marion County
- Lehigh
- Hillsboro
- Canada
- Marion
- Oursler
- Florence (east end)

== See also ==
- Florence, El Dorado, and Walnut Valley Railroad, a defunct railroad that started in Florence
- List of Kansas railroads
