= Central Branch =

Central Branch may refer to:

- Central Branch (Long Island Rail Road)
- Central Branch Union Pacific Railroad
