= IXD =

IXD may refer to:

- New Century AirCenter (FAA LID code IXD), Kansas, US
- Prayagraj Airport (IATA code IXD), Prayagraj, India
