= Ellinwood, Kansas =

City in Barton County, Kansas

- City
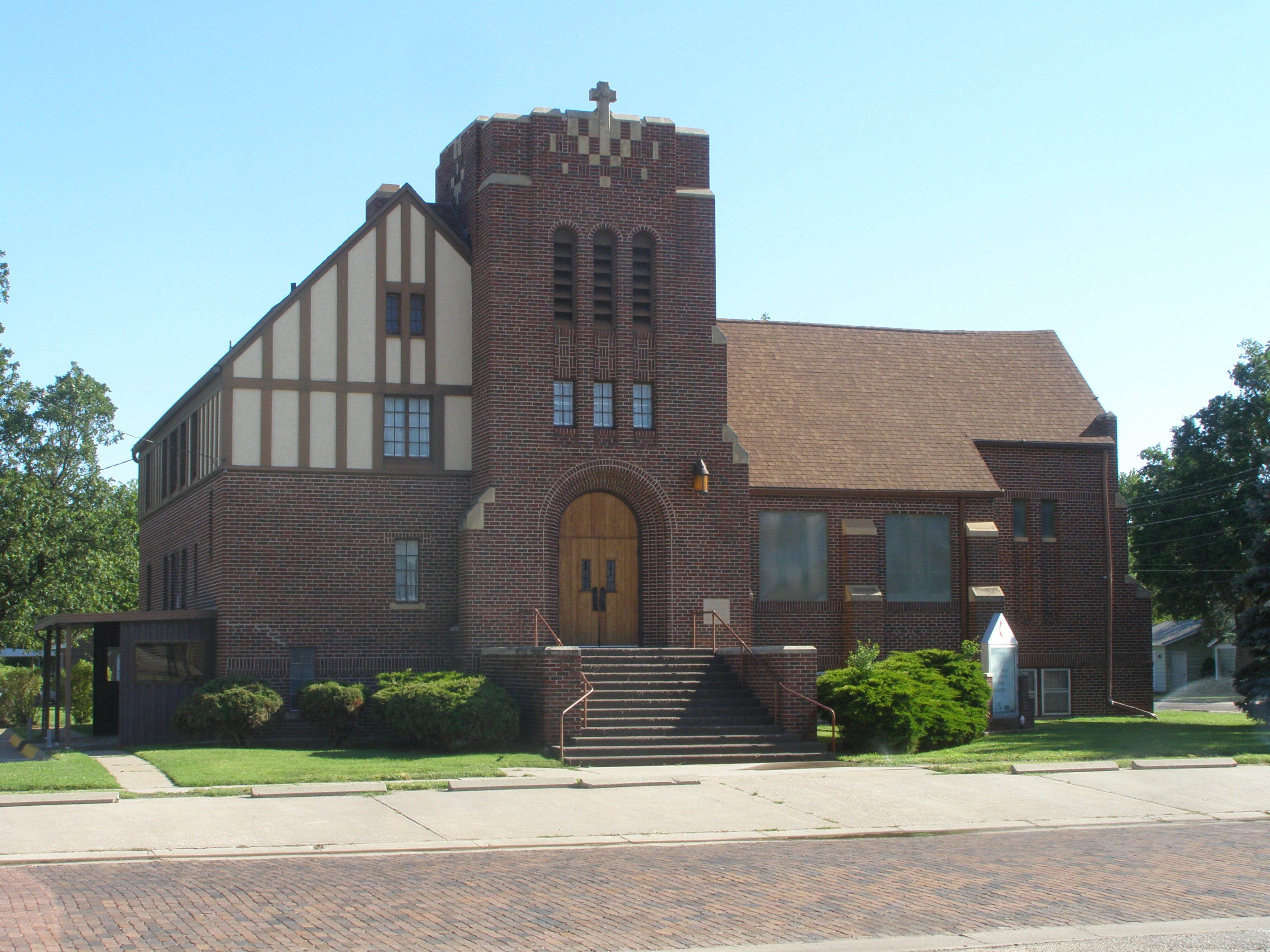
- United Methodist Church (2012)

- Location within Barton County and Kansas

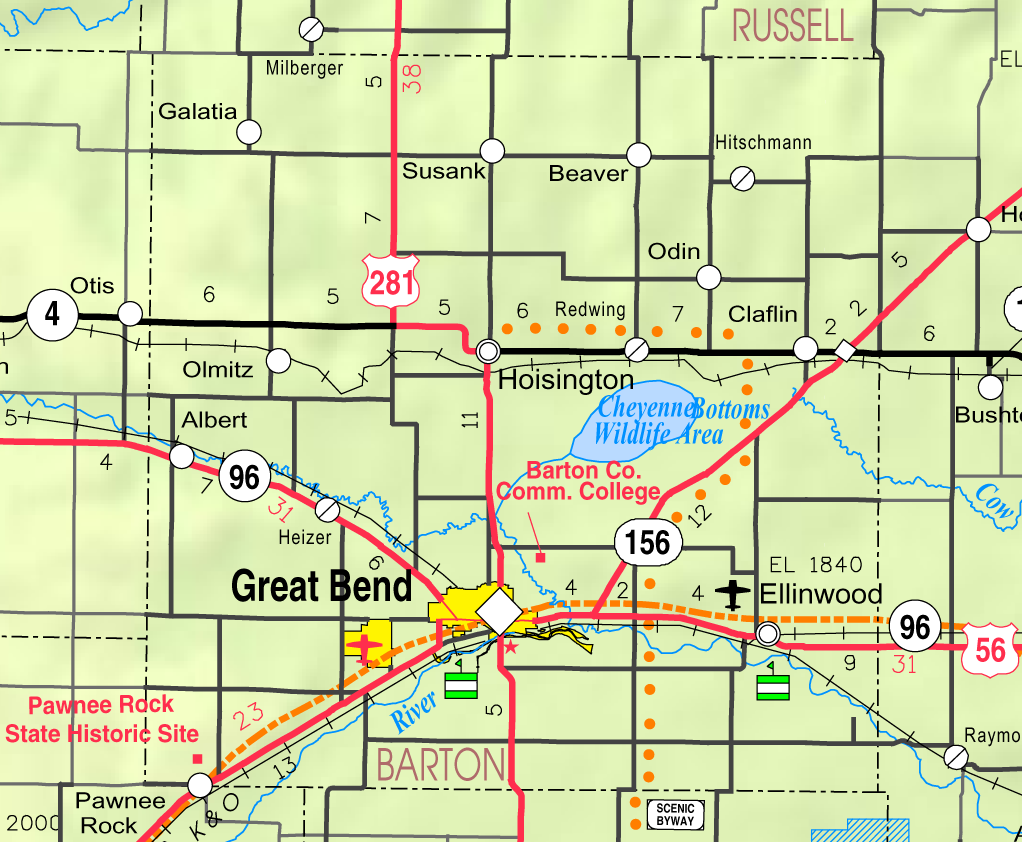
- KDOT map of Barton County (legend)
- Coordinates: 38°21′22″N 98°34′51″W
- Country: United States
- State: Kansas
- County: Barton
- Founded: 1871
- Incorporated: 1878
- Named for: Colonel John Ellinwood

Area
  - Total: 1.32 sq mi (3.42 km^{2})
  - Land: 1.32 sq mi (3.42 km^{2})
  - Water: 0 sq mi (0.00 km^{2})
- Elevation: 1,788 ft (545 m)

Population (2020)
  - Total: 2,011
  - Density: 1,520/sq mi (588/km^{2})
- Time zone: UTC-6 (CST)
  - Summer (DST): UTC-5 (CDT)
- ZIP Code: 67526
- Area code: 620
- FIPS code: 20-20425
- GNIS ID: 475775
- Website: cityofellinwoodks.com

Ellinwood is a city in the southeastern corner of Barton County, Kansas, United States. As of the 2020 census, the population of the city was 2,011.

== History ==
=== 19th century ===
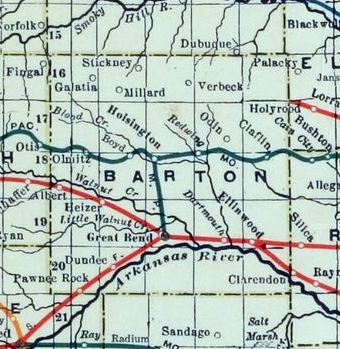
1915 railroad map of Barton County

For millennia, the land now known as Kansas was inhabited by Native Americans. In 1803, most of modern Kansas was secured by the United States as part of the Louisiana Purchase. In 1854, the Kansas Territory was organized, then in 1861 Kansas became the 34th U.S. state. In 1867, Barton County was founded.

The first claim at Ellinwood was staked in 1871 when it was certain the Santa Fe railroad would be completed nearby. Milton W. Halsey made the first claim, while his friend, Aaron Burlison, was the town's first postmaster. The railroad was finished in 1872 and the city was named after Colonel John R. Ellinwood, a civil engineer working for the Santa Fe railroad. Although neither the founder nor the original settlers were German, many of the main streets were given German names, in order to appeal to German immigrant buyers.

In 1876, the Catholic settlers of Ellinwood organized a parish, followed by the Lutherans in 1877.

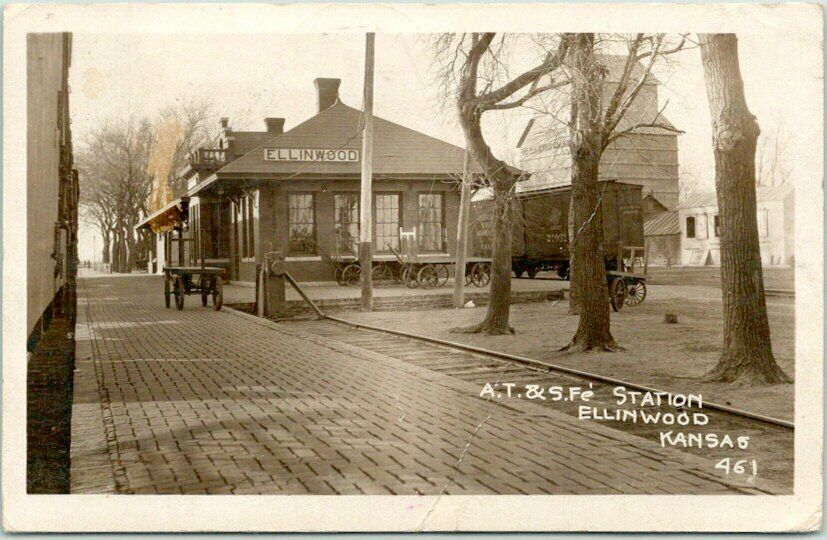
Ellinwood, 1917

In 1878, Atchison, Topeka and Santa Fe Railway and parties from Marion and McPherson counties chartered the Marion and McPherson Railway Company. In 1879, a branch line was built from Florence to McPherson; in 1880 it was extended to Lyons and in 1881 was extended to Ellinwood. The line was leased and operated by the Atchison, Topeka and Santa Fe Railway. The line from Florence to Marion was abandoned in 1968.

1878 was also the year when Ellinwood was incorporated. The first mayor was F. A. Steckel.

=== 20th century ===
In 1973, the rock band Kansas rented the Ellinwood Opera House as a "tryout show" for New York record executive Wally Gold, using free beer as a marketing tool, and charged a US$0.25 entry fee to help cover some of their expenses. The story is told in the 2015 documentary Miracles Out of Nowhere.

In 1992, the Atchison, Topeka and Santa Fe railroad line from Marion to McPherson was sold to Central Kansas Railway. In 1993, after heavy flood damage, the line from Marion to McPherson was abandoned. The original branch line connected Florence, Marion, Canada, Hillsboro, Lehigh, Canton, Galva, McPherson, Conway, Windom, Little River, Mitchell, Lyons, Chase and Ellinwood.

== Geography ==
According to the United States Census Bureau, the city has a total area of 1.14 square miles (2.95 km^{2}), all land. The city is situated along the path of the historic Santa Fe Trail. Ellinwood is also located just north of the Arkansas River, roughly in the area where it makes its "great bend" to the southeast en route to its final destination, the Mississippi River.

=== Climate ===
The climate in this area is characterized by hot, humid summers and generally mild to cool winters. According to the Köppen Climate Classification system, Ellinwood has a humid subtropical climate, abbreviated "Cfa" on climate maps.

== Demographics ==
Historical population
Census	Pop.	Note	%±
1880	352		—
1890	684		94.3%
1900	760		11.1%
1910	976		28.4%
1920	1,103		13.0%
1930	1,115		1.1%
1940	2,059		84.7%
1950	2,569		24.8%
1960	2,729		6.2%
1970	2,416		−11.5%
1980	2,508		3.8%
1990	2,329		−7.1%
2000	2,164		−7.1%
2010	2,131		−1.5%
2020	2,011		−5.6%
U.S. Decennial Census

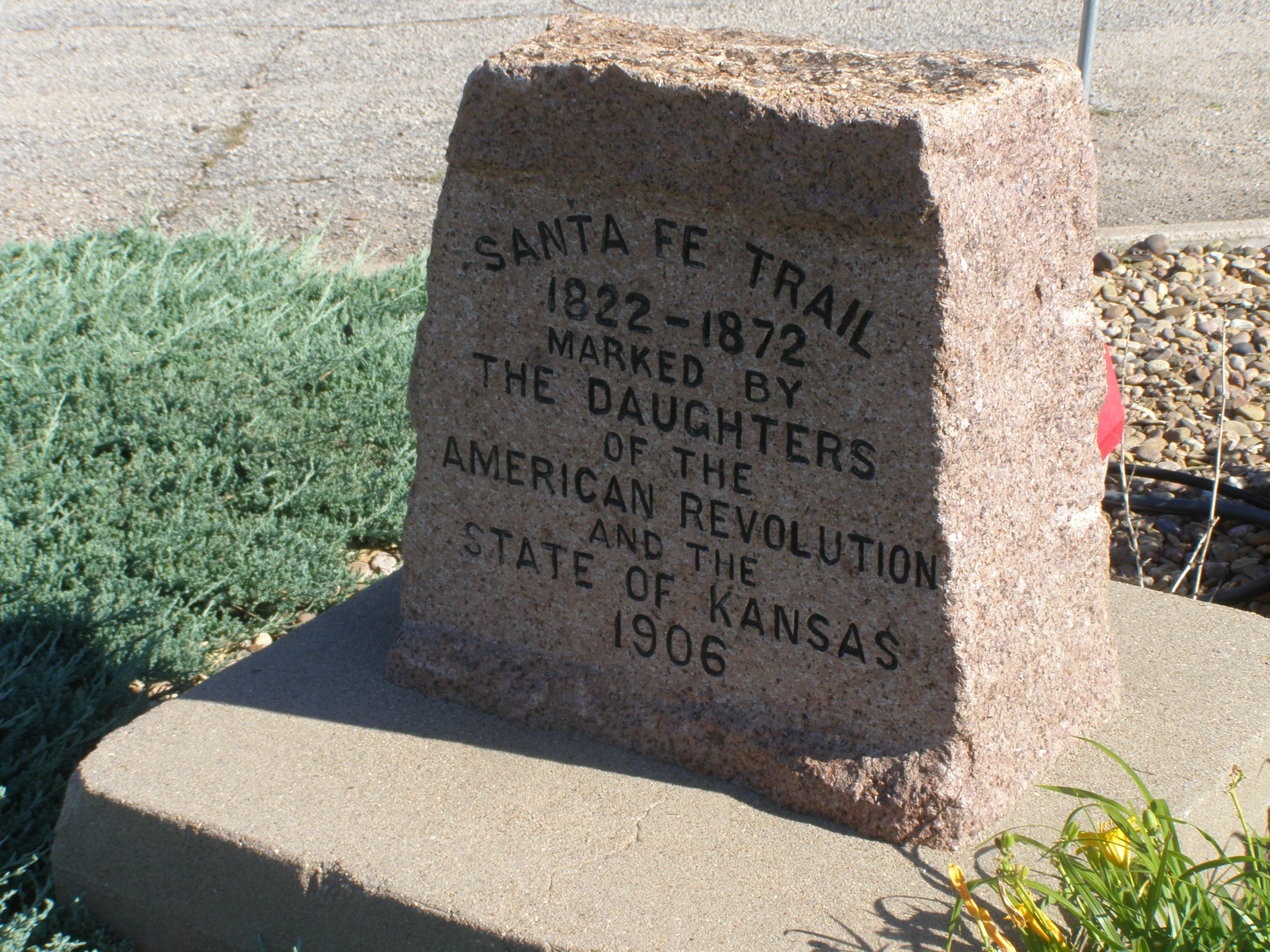
Santa Fe Trail DAR marker in Ellinwood

=== 2020 census ===
As of the 2020 census, Ellinwood had a population of 2,011, including 548 families.

The median age was 41.7 years. 24.0% of residents were under the age of 18, 6.7% were from ages 18 to 24, 22.6% were from ages 25 to 44, 24.1% were from ages 45 to 64, and 22.7% were ages 65 and older. For every 100 females, there were 97.0 males, and for every 100 females age 18 and over, there were 93.5 males age 18 and over.

There were 862 households, of which 28.9% had children under the age of 18 living in them. Of all households, 47.6% were married-couple households, 19.7% were households with a male householder and no spouse or partner present, and 28.0% were households with a female householder and no spouse or partner present. About 33.0% of all households were made up of individuals, and 16.5% had someone living alone who was 65 years of age or older.

There were 986 housing units, of which 12.6% were vacant. The homeowner vacancy rate was 2.3% and the rental vacancy rate was 9.8%. The population density was 1,522.3 inhabitants per square mile (587.8/km^{2}), and housing density was 746.4 per square mile (288.2/km^{2}).

0.0% of residents lived in urban areas, while 100.0% lived in rural areas.

Racial composition as of the 2020 census
Race	Number	Percent
White	1,875	93.2%
Black or African American	6	0.3%
American Indian and Alaska Native	9	0.4%
Asian	5	0.2%
Native Hawaiian and Other Pacific Islander	0	0.0%
Some other race	25	1.2%
Two or more races	91	4.5%
Hispanic or Latino (of any race)	90	4.5%

=== Education ===
The percent of those with a bachelor's degree or higher was estimated to be 16.3% of the population in the 2016–2020 American Community Survey 5-year estimates.

=== Households and housing ===
In the 2016–2020 American Community Survey 5-year estimates, the average household size was 2.4 and the average family size was 3.0.

=== Income and poverty ===
The 2016–2020 5-year American Community Survey estimates show that the median household income was $48,322 (with a margin of error of +/- $8,214) and the median family income was $68,822 (+/- $2,351). Males had a median income of $34,776 (+/- $4,847) versus $19,279 (+/- $4,892) for females. The median income for those above 16 years old was $27,422 (+/- $6,776). Approximately, 5.5% of families and 11.2% of the population were below the poverty line, including 11.4% of those under the age of 18 and 11.9% of those ages 65 or over.

=== 2010 census ===
As of the census of 2010, there were 2,131 people, 910 households, and 601 families living in the city. The population density was 1,869.3 inhabitants per square mile (721.7/km^{2}). There were 1,042 housing units at an average density of 914.0 per square mile (352.9/km^{2}). The racial makeup of the city was 96.5% White, 0.3% African American, 0.6% Native American, 0.9% from other races, and 1.7% from two or more races. Hispanic or Latino of any race were 2.9% of the population.

There were 910 households, of which 28.9% had children under the age of 18 living with them, 54.1% were married couples living together, 8.1% had a female householder with no husband present, 3.8% had a male householder with no wife present, and 34.0% were non-families. 30.3% of all households were made up of individuals, and 14.1% had someone living alone who was 65 years of age or older. The average household size was 2.28 and the average family size was 2.80.

The median age in the city was 43.7 years. 22.7% of residents were under the age of 18; 8.3% were between the ages of 18 and 24; 20% were from 25 to 44; 27.5% were from 45 to 64; and 21.6% were 65 years of age or older. The gender makeup of the city was 48.4% male and 51.6% female.

== Area attractions ==
- Downtown Tunnels, containing a ghost town

== Area events ==
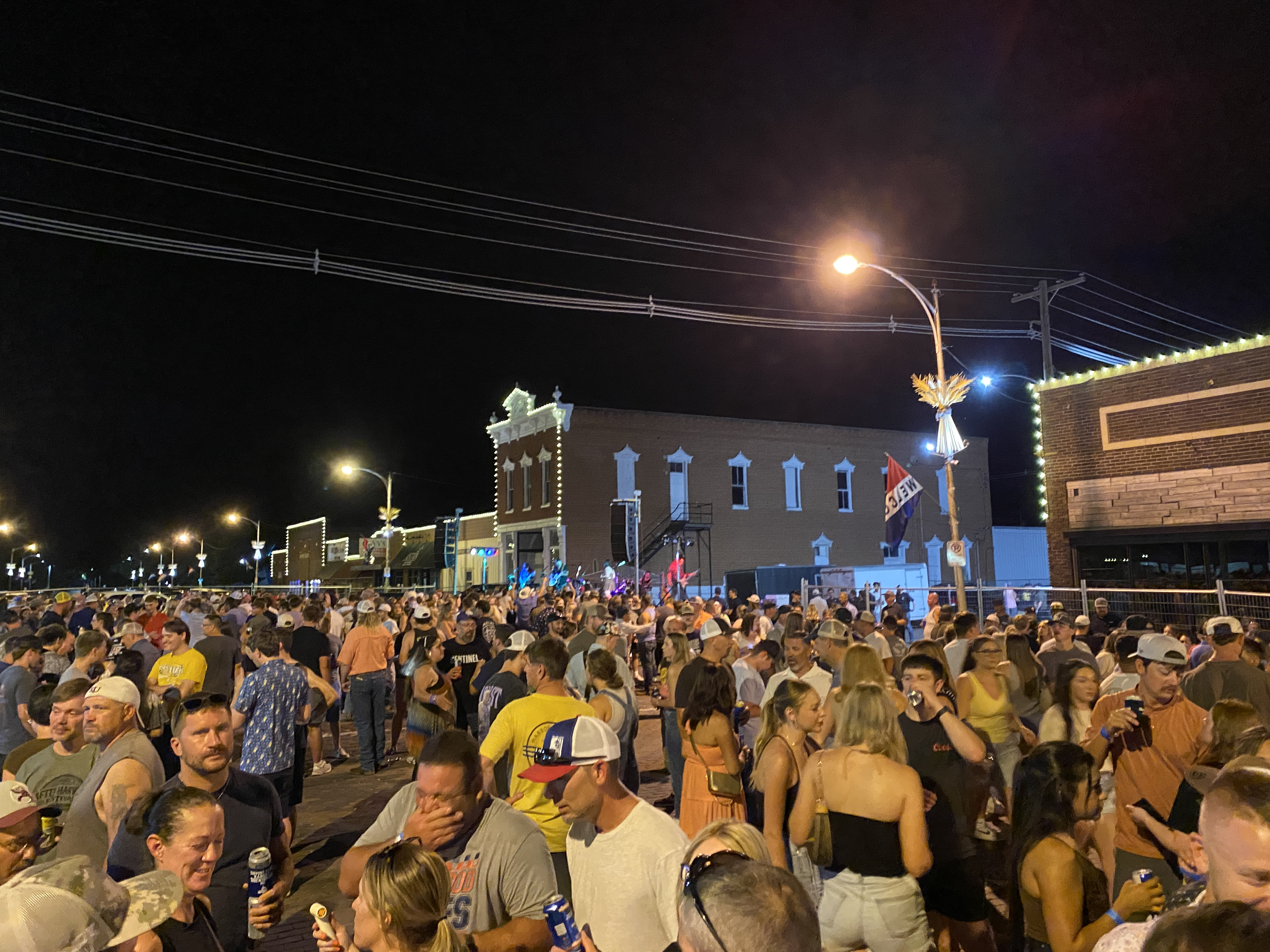
Crowd at street dance during 2026 After Harvest Festival

=== After Harvest Festival ===
Held annually during the third weekend in July, The After Harvest Festival (also known as AHF) started in 1973. The three day event starts on Thursday night with a community barbecue, followed by a 5K run/walk on Friday. Saturday's events involve a parade down Main Street, a fishing derby at Wolf Pond, a golf tournament at the golf course, and a concert on Saturday night. A beer garden runs all three nights. It is also the main weekend for class reunions.

=== Christkindlmarket ===
Held on the first Saturday in December, the Christkindlmarket started in 2013. Winter shopping specials occur through the day, with the day culminating in a tree lighting and living nativity.

== Education ==
The community is served by Ellinwood USD 355 public school district. It has Ellinwood High/Middle School and Ellinwood Grade School.

There is one parochial school, as Saint Joseph School serves grades K–8.

The Lutheran Church runs St. John Child Development Center, which serves as the town's preschool.

== Transportation ==
U.S. Route 56 runs through the city.

The Atchison, Topeka and Santa Fe previously provided passenger and freight rail service to Ellinwood. The first depot was built in 1872 by Hugo Kullak, when the line was laid through town. A new, two-story depot was built in 1883, which would again be replaced in 1903 by a brick depot. The 1903 depot is no longer used for railroad purposes, but continues to stand on site.

== Notable people ==
- Wally Hickel (1919–2010), Governor of Alaska and Secretary of the Interior

== See also ==
- Santa Fe Trail
