= Colorado Pacific Railroad =

Short line railroad

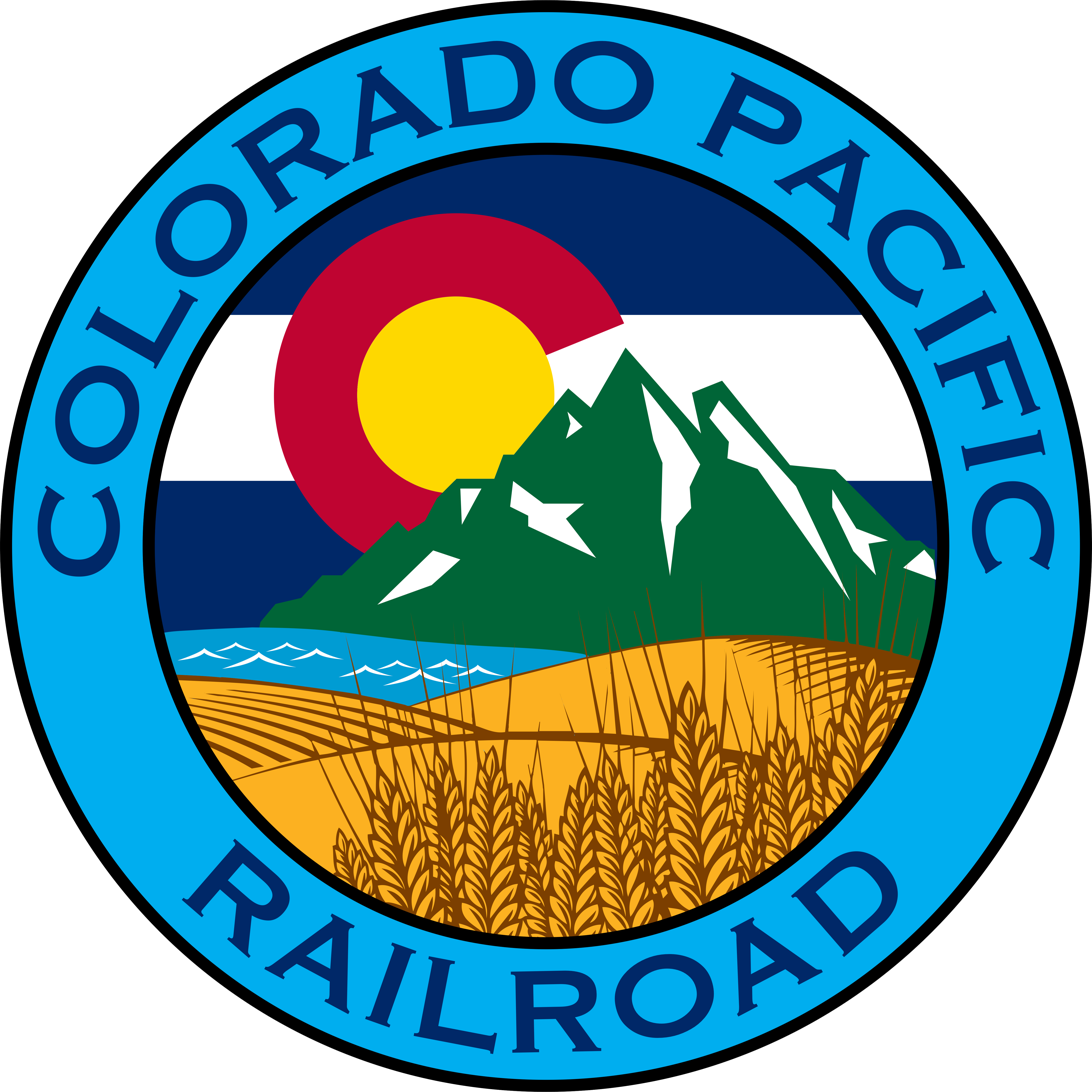

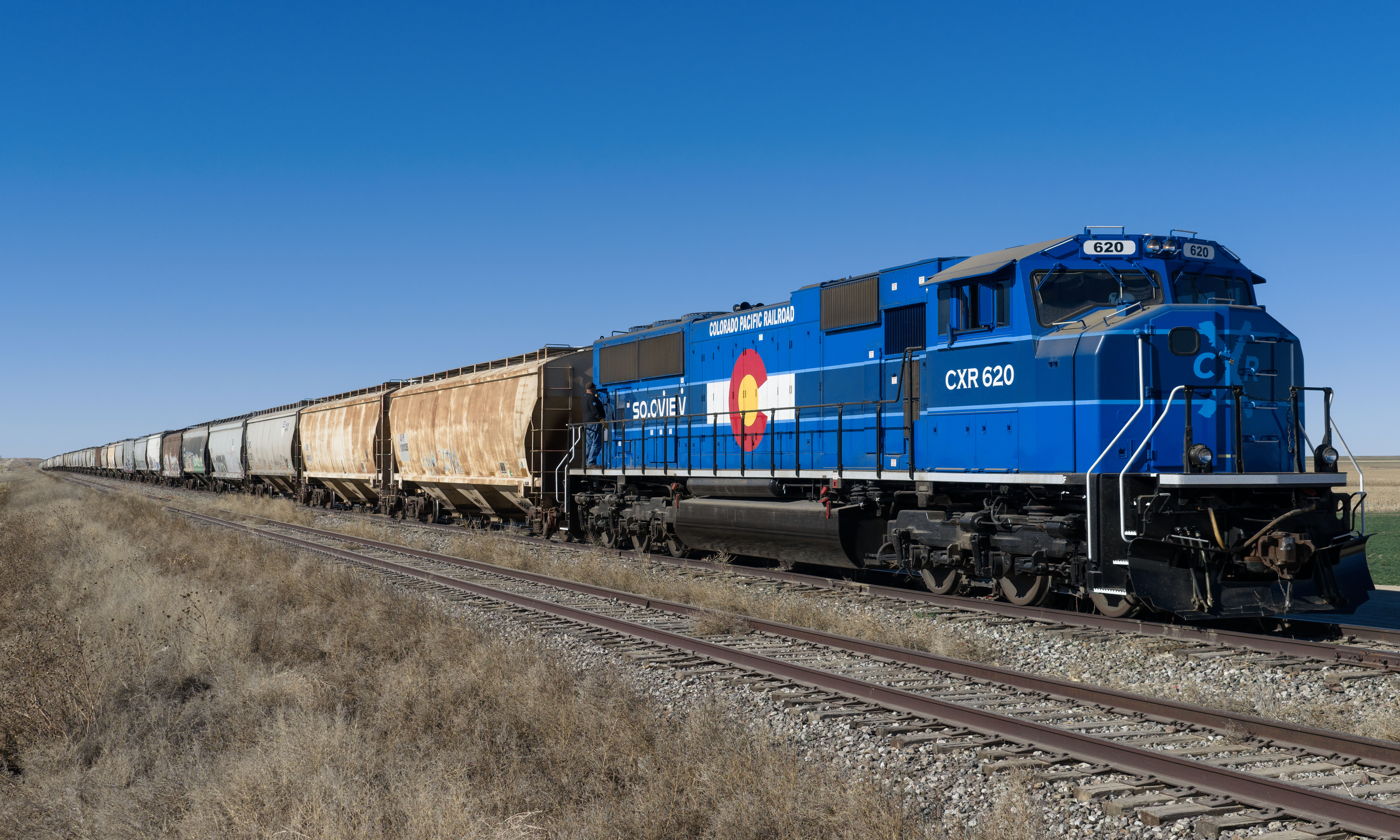
- A grain train in Sheridan Lake, CO

Overview
- Parent company: The Soloviev Group
- Headquarters: Alamosa, Colorado
- Reporting mark: CXR
- Locale: Colorado
- Dates of operation: 2020–Present
- Predecessor: Missouri Pacific, Union Pacific

Technical
- Track gauge: 4 ft 8 1/2 in (1,435 mm) standard gauge
- Length: 122 miles (196 km)

Other
- Website: https://coloradopacificrailroad.com/

The Colorado Pacific Railroad is a shortline railroad operating on 122 miles (196 km) of former Missouri Pacific Railroad trackage in southeast Colorado. It interchanges with Union Pacific and BNSF at North Avondale Junction near Boone and with the Kansas and Oklahoma Railroad at Towner, following state highway 96. It is sometimes referred to as the Towner Line or the Towner Railway.

== History ==
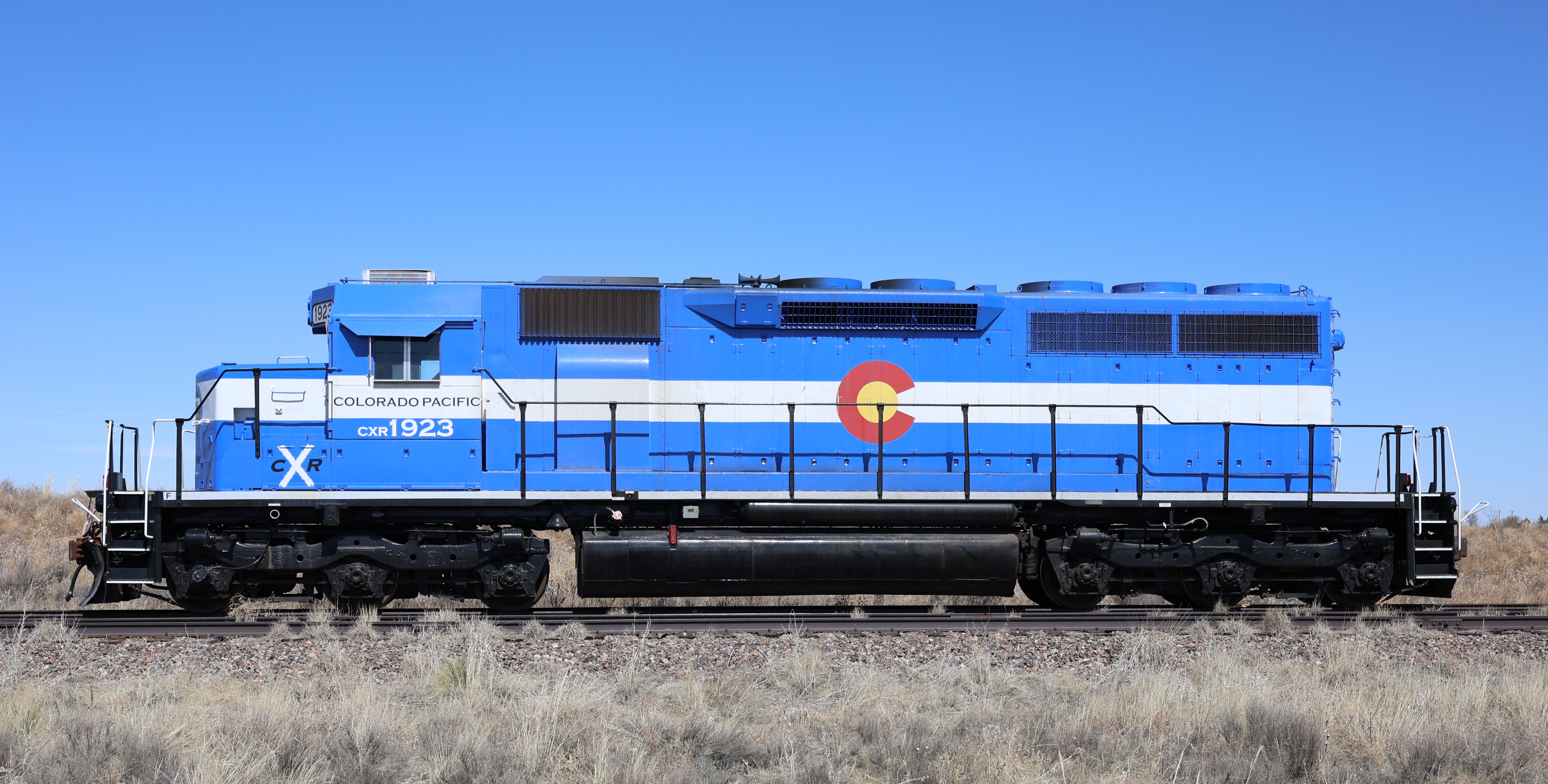
One of the railroad's locomotives

The line was constructed in the late 1880s by the Missouri Pacific Railroad as part of its mainline between Pueblo and Kansas City. As a condition of the 1982 Missouri Pacific - Union Pacific merger, the Denver & Rio Grande Western got trackage rights over this line. The D&RGW merged with the Southern Pacific in 1992.

Southern Pacific's adquisition of Denver & Rio Grande Western made the old MoPac route to Pueblo and the former Rio Grande line from Pueblo to Dotsero via Tennessee Pass SP's preferred Transcon route from the West Coast to the Midwest. By then, the company had its own route from California to Pueblo via Donner Pass, Salt Lake City and Tennessee Pass, in addition to trackage rights on the old MP line from Kansas to Pueblo.

The lowest point for the line came in 1996 with the merger between Union Pacific and SP. Given UP's preference for using the old Kansas Pacific (KP) main line that run directly to Denver without passing through Pueblo, and the Moffat Tunnel Subdivision instead of the Tennessee Pass Sub for traffic to and from California, the old MP line to Pueblo, along with the Tennessee Pass line, once SP's favorite Transcon, became redundants in the newly merged system.

The last revenue trains run on the line in August 1997, and shortly thereafter UP requested that the line be abandoned before the Surface Transportation Board (STB). The STB approved the abandonment as part of the merger.

The Colorado Department of Transportation purchased the line from UP in 1998 for $10.2 million in hopes of finding a short-line operator to serve farmers and others in small towns along the route. In 2000, CDOT leased the line to the Colorado, Kansas & Pacific Railway. In 2004, the lease was transferred to V&S Railway. However, V&S ownership appeared to locals as intent on scrapping the railroad for immediate cash, and freight tonnage began to decrease. Plus the activity lasted off and on until 2009 or 2010 when service ended and the section from North Avondale to Haswell was only used for car storage.

=== Soloviev Group ownership ===
Real estate magnate Stefan Soloviev's Crossroads Agriculture began operating in the area in 2007, and became interested in the railroad line when learning about V&S's intention to scrap it. He decided to purchase the line to facilitate grain transportation at lower costs. Upon discovering Soloviev's intentions, in 2014 V&S began preparing the line to be scrapped by removing tie spikes and anchors, but this was problematic as they had not yet received legal approval from the STB to formally abandon the line. Soloviev asked the STB to force the sale of the railroad. His request was granted, and the sale took place in 2016.

Over the following years, rehabilitation took place and railroad operations gradually resumed, with plans to expand service as new infrastructure is completed.

During the following years, the Soloviev Group would purchase two more railroads in Colorado: San Luis and Rio Grande Railroad (SLRG), which would be renamed Colorado Pacific Rio Grande (CXRG), and the San Luis Central Railroad, which would be renamed Colorado Pacific San Luis. The Soloviev Group also tried to buy UP's line from Pueblo to Dotsero through the Tennessee Pass, dormant (but not abandoned) since 1997, although it was not possible to reach a sale agreement with UP, owner of the line, nor with the Surface Transportation Board (STB) which, being the highest federal agency in the matter, had to approve the sale of the line.

In February 2026, farmers who are customers of Weskan Grain, together with that company, which is part of the Soloviev Group, filed a lawsuit in Kansas District Court, alleging that Union Pacific, together with Kansas & Oklahoma, owned by WATCO, have a "secret" agreement that increases the cost of grain shipments from elevators located on sections of the Towner Line in western Kansas that currently belong to K&O, if they are interchanged with Colorado Pacific, preventing or slowing down such shipments from being interchanged with that railroad in Towner. The parties that initiated the litigation indicated that the conduct of K&O and Union Pacifico is clearly monopolistic, which goes against existing antitrust laws.

Both Union Pacific and K&O quickly moved to refute Weskan Grain's accusations. UP argued that the STB is the only competent authority to arbitrate in the situation, while K&O preferred not to comment on the matter.

== Rolling stock ==
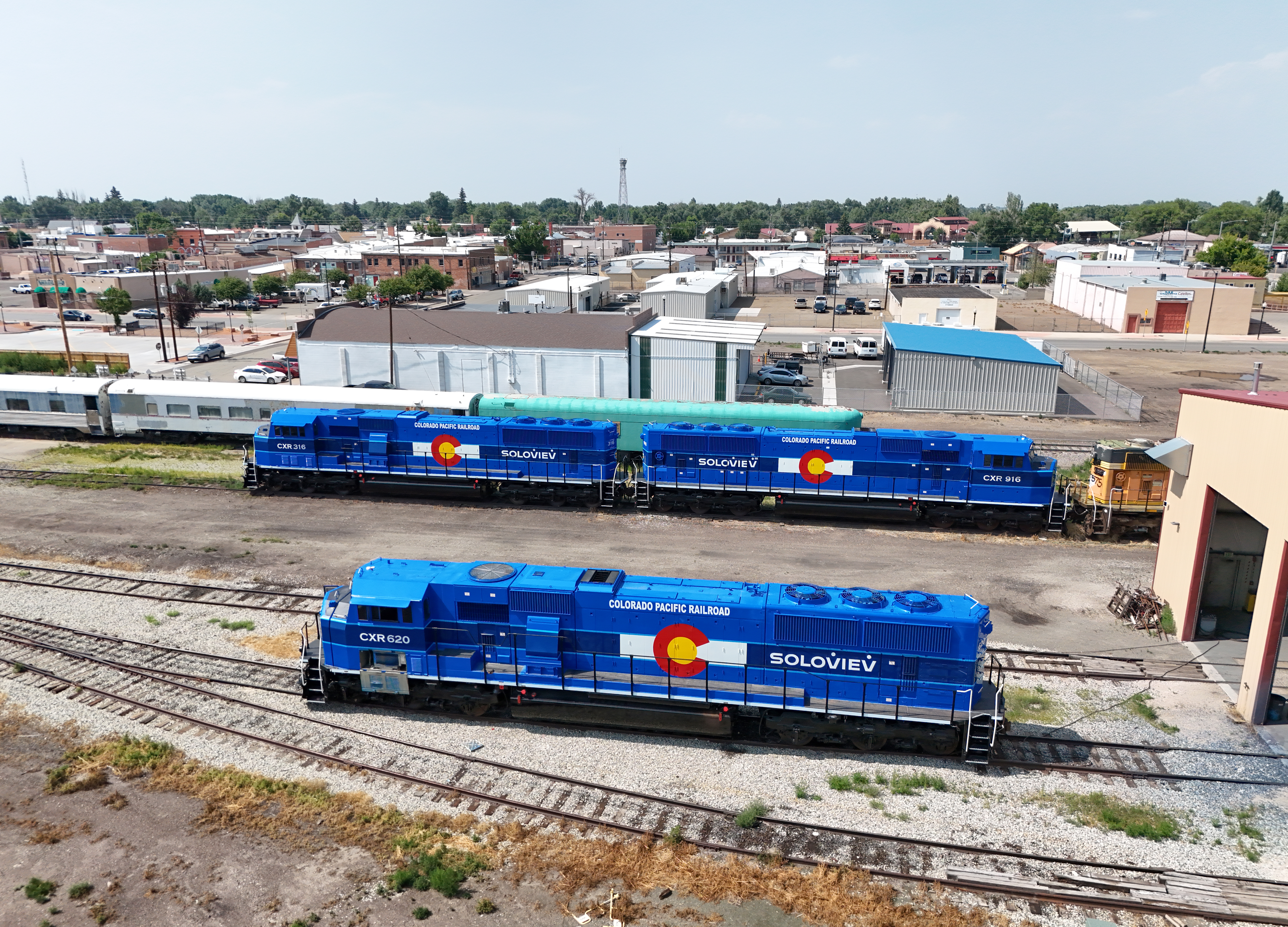
3 of the 4 ex-BNSF SD70MACs acquired from BUGX, in CXR corporate scheme and 1 still in BNSF scheme outside the Alamosa, Colorado shops

The railroad owns two EMD SD40-2s, painted blue and prominently displaying the Colorado Pacific logo. In 2024, four SD70MACs were delivered from the Colorado Pacific Rio Grande shops in Alamosa, Colorado.
