= V&S Railway =

Shortline railroad in Kansas, USA

Overview
- Headquarters: Salt Lake City, Utah
- Reporting mark: VSR
- Locale: Central Kansas

Technical
- Track gauge: 4 ft 8 1/2 in (1,435 mm) standard gauge

The V&S Railway (reporting mark VSR) is a shortline railroad that operates two disconnected lines in the U.S. state of Kansas. It is affiliated with A&K Railroad Materials. The company acquired its first line, a former Atchison, Topeka and Santa Fe Railway line between Medicine Lodge and a BNSF Railway junction at Attica, from the Central Kansas Railway in 2000. In 2006 it expanded its operations by acquiring from the Hutchinson and Northern Railway (reporting mark HN) a short segment of former interurban in eastern Hutchinson, where it interchanges with the BNSF Railway, Union Pacific Railroad, and Kansas and Oklahoma Railroad. Other railroads that where under common control with the V&S are the out-of-service Kern Valley Railroad in Colorado, the Gloster Southern Railroad in Louisiana and Mississippi, the Grenada Railway and Natchez Railway in Mississippi, a portion of the former Rock Island from St. Louis to Union, Missouri operated by the Missouri Central and the Southern Manitoba Railway in Manitoba.

== History ==
The Southern Kansas Railway, a predecessor of the Atchison, Topeka and Santa Fe Railway, opened a branch from Attica to Medicine Lodge in August 1885, and another Santa Fe predecessor, the Denver, Kansas and Gulf Railway, completed a line from Kiowa through Medicine Lodge to Belvidere in 1907. In January 1993, the Central Kansas Railway took over operation from the Santa Fe on the remaining piece between Attica and Sun City, and in late 2000 the V&S Railway bought the line. Abandonment between Medicine Lodge and Sun City was authorized in 2003.

A portion of the Hutchinson line was opened by the Arkansas Valley Interurban Railway in December 1915 as the end of a line from Wichita, and the Hutchinson and Northern Railway built the remainder in 1923 as a connecting electric freight line. The H&N later acquired a piece of the interurban and dieselized its lines. The V&S acquired the entire property of the H&N in 2006.

== Former lines ==
V&S previously operated the Towner line in Kiowa County, Colorado, prior to a forced sale to the newly-organized Colorado Pacific Railroad in 2014.
