= Florence, El Dorado, and Walnut Valley Railroad =

Former short-line railroad in Kansas, US

The Florence, El Dorado, and Walnut Valley Railroad was a short-line railroad in central Kansas.

== History ==
In 1877, the Florence, El Dorado, and Walnut Valley Railroad Company built a branch line from Florence to El Dorado. In 1881, it was extended to Douglass, and later to Arkansas City. In 1901, the line was leased and operated by the Atchison, Topeka and Santa Fe Railway, which used the name "Florence & Arkansas City Division" for it.

The line from Florence to El Dorado was abandoned in 1942 to reclaim the metal rails for the war effort during World War II because of a shortage of materials during those years.

Currently, the remaining part of the former Florence, El Dorado, and Walnut Valley Railroad that still exists is:

- El Dorado to Arkansas City.

== Stations ==
At a high-level, the railroad connected the primary cities of Florence (north end), El Dorado, Augusta, Winfield, Arkansas City (south end).

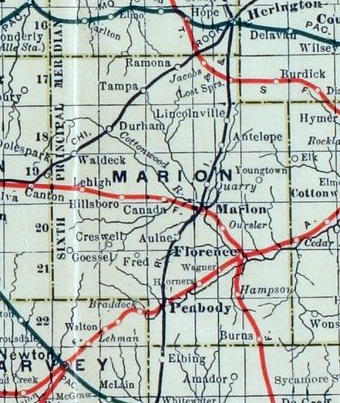
1915 Railroad Map of Marion County

Marion County

- Florence (north end)
- Hampson, station
- Burns

Butler County

- Alki, station
- De Graff
- El Dorado
- Augusta
- Douglass

Cowley County

- Rock
- Akron, station
- Winfield
- Arkansas City (south end)

== See also ==
- Marion and McPherson Railroad, a defunct railroad that started in Florence.
- Southern Transcon, currently uses tracks from El Dorado to Augusta.
- List of Kansas railroads
