= Kansas Southern Railway =

The Kansas Southern Railway operated from December 11, 2000, until 2002 as a subcontractor of the V&S Railway. It operated on about 43 miles (69 km) of track between Attica, Kansas, and Sun City, Kansas. It interchanged with the BNSF Railway and operated three weekly freight trains over the entire line.
