= Prairie Central Railway =

Defunct Railway line that ran from Decatur, IL to Paris, IL, USA

Overview
- Headquarters: Decatur, Illinois
- Reporting mark: PACY
- Locale: Illinois
- Dates of operation: 1980–

Technical
- Track gauge: 4 ft 8 1/2 in (1,435 mm) standard gauge

The Prairie Central Railway (reporting mark PACY) was a short railroad line that ran from Decatur to Paris, Illinois. It was based in Decatur, and ran on about 74 miles (119 km) worth of mostly former Pennsylvania, later Penn Central Railroad, Conrail and eventually Wabash Valley Railroad trackage. In 1982, the railroad was extended to include approximately 80 miles (130 km), south from Paris to Mt. Carmel on former New York Central trackage, terminating at the Southern Railway.

The Prairie Central Railway was formed during the 1980s deregulation period by Craig Burroughs, which consisted of several railroad properties. An affiliate railroad was formed as the Prairie Trunk (PARY) which ran from Flora, Illinois, to Shawneetown, Illinois on former Baltimore and Ohio trackage.

Power for the trains consisted mainly of former Conrail GE U25Bs, tracing their heritage to the Pennsylvania Railroad. Another source lists their roster as also including GE U30Bs 2883 and 2885 and GM-EMD GP9s 7300 and 7302 originally owned by the New York Central.

The railroad ceased operations in 1984 when Illinois Central Railroad embargoed the line for unpaid trackage rights. After the case was settled, the locomotives were sold for scrap.
