= Garden City Western Railway =

Railway in Kansas

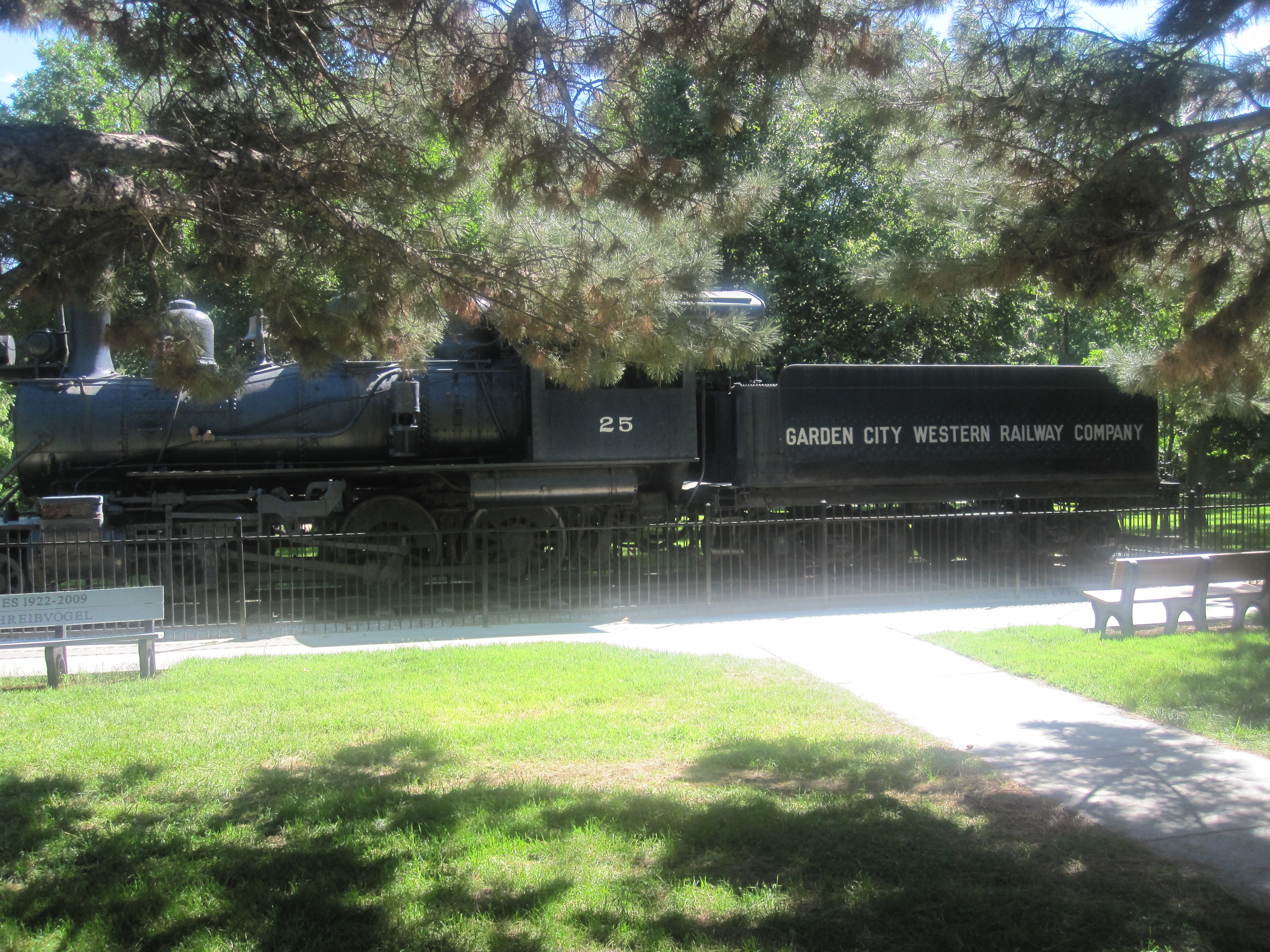

Overview
- Headquarters: Garden City, Kansas
- Reporting mark: GCW
- Locale: Kansas
- Dates of operation: 1916; 110 years ago–present

Technical
- Track gauge: 4 ft 8 1/2 in (1,435 mm) standard gauge

The Garden City Western Railway (reporting mark GCW) is a railroad operating in the U.S. state of Kansas. GCW was organized in 1916, first owned by The Garden City Sugar and Land Company and then owned by the Garden City Coop, Inc. The GCW is located in southwest Kansas and totals 40 miles (64 km) of operating railroad and interchanges with BNSF Railway. GCW was purchased by Pioneer Railcorp on April 29, 1999. The primary commodities include grain, frozen beef, fertilizer, farm implements, feed products and utility poles.

== History ==
The Garden City Sugar and Land Company, at Garden City, Kansas, created a railroad known as the Garden City Western Railway, constructed between August 1, 1915, and January 12, 1916, the latter being its first day of operation. This railroad extended from the Sugar Factory at Garden City in a northwesterly direction about fourteen miles (23 km) through farm lands, held by the Garden City Sugar and Land Company. The road was built to take care of products of Garden City Sugar and Land Company's holdings in land.

The Nebraska, Kansas and Southern Railway track was laid out 12.6 miles (20.3 km) from Garden City and was never operational. The rail, fastenings and ties from this railroad were sold in 1915 at a Sheriff's auction to the Garden City Western Railway Company, a subsidiary of the Garden City Sugar and Land Company.

A snapshot of the Garden City Western as of November 6, 1925 showed it with 13.924 miles of single-track, standard gauge mainline running from a connection with the AT&SF at Garden City northwesterly to Wolf, Kansas, as well as having 1.265 miles of yard tracks and sidings, for a total of 15.189 miles of track. It possessed at that time one locomotive, three box cars, one gondola car, and one box-car caboose. It was headquartered in Garden City.

On 1 September 1991 the Garden City Northern Railway (GCNR) merged with the Garden City Western Railway.

A GCW steam locomotive is currently on static display at the Lee Richardson Zoo in Garden City, located behind the Snack/Gift Shop and across the Drive-In Entrance/Kiosk.
