= Wichita Terminal Association =

Overview
- Headquarters: Wichita, Kansas
- Reporting mark: WTA
- Locale: Wichita, Kansas
- Dates of operation: 1910–

Technical
- Track gauge: 4 ft 8 1/2 in (1,435 mm) standard gauge

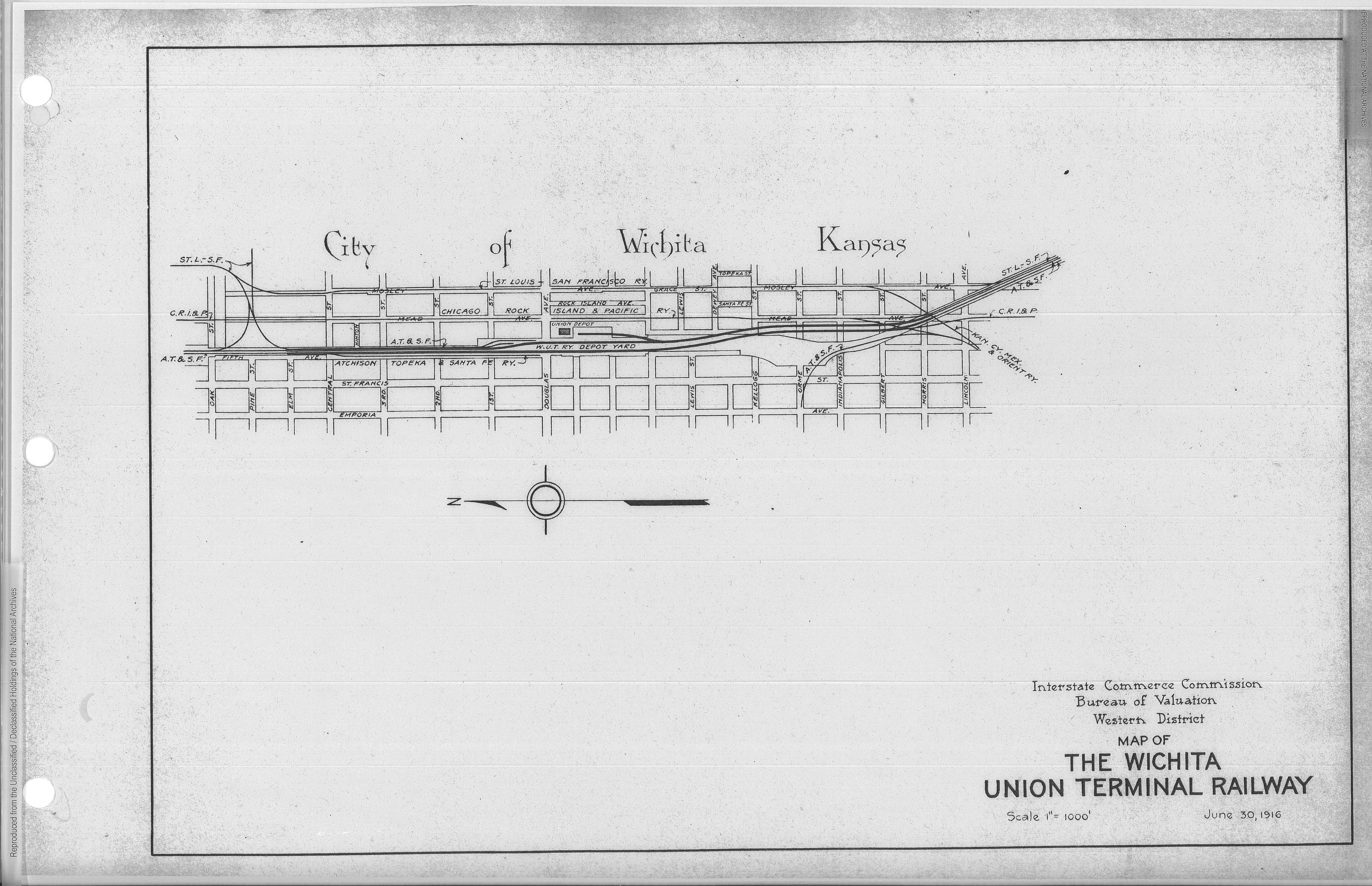
1916 map of the railroad (Wichita Union Terminal Railway)

The Wichita Terminal Association (reporting mark WTA) is a switching and terminal railroad in northern Wichita, Kansas, jointly owned by the BNSF Railway and Union Pacific Railroad. It handles mainly grain and some scrap steel, serving customers at the former Wichita Union Stock Yards. The tracks were first placed in service in September 1889 by the stockyard and packing companies, and in February 1910 operations were transferred to the new WTA, owned by the Atchison, Topeka and Santa Fe Railway, Chicago, Rock Island and Pacific Railway, Missouri Pacific Railway, and St. Louis and San Francisco Railroad. Through mergers, and the sale of the Rock Island's line to the Oklahoma, Kansas and Texas Railroad, the current split between BNSF and UP came about.
