= Hutchinson and Southern Railroad =

The Hutchinson and Southern Railroad
Overview
- Headquarters: Hutchinson, Kansas
- Locale: Kansas and Oklahoma
- Dates of operation: 1889–1898

Technical
- Track gauge: 4 ft 8 1/2 in (1,435 mm) standard gauge
- Length: 90.7 miles (146.0 km)

The Hutchinson and Southern Railroad was formed through articles of consolidation dated October 5, 1889 and filed in Kansas two days later. It combined The McPherson, Texas and Gulf Railroad Company, which had been incorporated in Kansas on May 31, 1887, with The Hutchison, Oklahoma and Gulf Railway Company, which had been incorporated in Kansas on March 7, 1889. The railroad originally built 32 miles of standard-gauge line from Hutchinson, Kansas south to Kingman, Kansas, plus 1.1 miles of siding, in 1889. At that point it had two locomotives and two passenger cars, and was headquartered in Hutchinson. In 1890 it gained approval for a scheme to construct track through Anthony, Kansas to the state line, then through Indian Territory and specifically through the towns of Pond Creek (now Jefferson) and Guthrie, and terminating at a point in Grayson County, Texas, possibly Denison. It finished trackage to the state line in 1890, giving it 82.2 miles of rails. But the Indian Territory portion of the line ended up terminating in Wakita, Oklahoma in February 1897, just 8.5 miles south of the Kansas-Oklahoma state line.

On January 21, 1898, the railroad was sold at a foreclosure sale to the Hutchinson and Southern Railway Company. That company in turn was acquired by the Atchison, Topeka and Santa Fe Railway on December 20, 1899. The trackage has since been abandoned.
