= St. Joseph and Grand Island Railway =

Railway line in Missouri and Nebraska, USA

The St. Joseph and Grand Island Railroad (SJ&GI) had its start as the St Joseph and Denver City Railroad which, after several changes of destination, was completed as the St Joseph and Western (SJ&W) between St Joseph, Missouri and Hastings, Nebraska in 1872.

Seven years later, the Hastings and Grand Island Railroad was built between its namesake cities and promptly sold to the SJ&W, giving that railroad a connection to the Union Pacific Railroad at Grand Island.

The SJ&W ran into financial difficulties, eventually falling into bankruptcy in 1884. The Union Pacific brought the railroad out of bankruptcy in 1885, reorganizing it as St Joseph and Grand Island Railroad. The Union Pacific lost control of the St. Joseph and Grand Island in 1898, but regained it in 1906.

The SJ&GI became an essential part of UP's system, providing a connection from the transcontinental mainline to the eastern Kansas area, and UP undertook several steps to improve it. In 1914 a connection was made between the UP mainline at Gibbon and Hastings, providing a more direct route than through Grand Island. Also, a connection was made between Marysville on the SJ&GI and Topeka in 1906, from whence the UP's Kansas Pacific mainline gave access to Kansas City.

Today, the portion of the SJ&GI between Hastings and Marysville remains a core part of the UP mainline, seeing dozens of trains per day. The SJ&GI exists east of Marysville as far as Hiawatha, Kansas, and is part of Union Pacific's Hiawatha Subdivision. The line is a directional westbound mainline primarily handling empty coal trains as well as merchandise and intermodal trains. These trains originate in Kansas City, MO and travel on Union Pacific's Falls City Subdivision to Hiawatha where they then proceed west to Marysville, KS, allowing for increased capacity on the Marysville Subdivision. A short stub exists at Grand Island to serve a nearby power plant.

The railroad had a practice of naming stations along its route alphabetically. This has resulted in a string of towns in Nebraska being situated in alphabetical order, starting with Alexandria in the east and ending with Newark in the west.
