= Garden City Northern Railway =

Railway in Kansas

Overview
- Headquarters: Garden City, Kansas
- Reporting mark: GCN
- Locale: Kansas
- Dates of operation: September 7, 1989–September 1, 1991
- Successor: Garden City Western Railway

Technical
- Track gauge: 4 ft 8 1/2 in (1,435 mm) standard gauge

The Garden City Northern Railway (reporting mark GCN) line ran from Garden City to Shallow Water, Kansas about 31 miles (50 km). This trackage was originally built by the Garden City, Gulf and Northern Railway (GCG&N) on January 4, 1907. In July 1911, the GCG&N and its entire line came under Atchison, Topeka and Santa Fe Railway (ATSF) control. The ATSF operated the line until September 1989, when GCN took over the line. The GCN was combined with parent Garden City Western Railway in September 1991.
