= New Century AirCenter Railroad =

Switching railroad in Kansas

Overview
- Headquarters: Olathe, Kansas
- Reporting mark: JCAX
- Locale: Kansas
- Dates of operation: 1978–present

Technical
- Track gauge: 4 ft 8 1/2 in (1,435 mm)

New Century AirCenter Railroad (JCAX) provides rail switching services within the New Century AirCenter business park in Johnson County, Kansas. Clients include Altiras Chemical LLC, CFS Sauer Foods Inc., IFF Nutrition and Health, deElliotte Company Inc., Steel and Pipe Supply Company Inc., Cedar Creek LLC, Wausau Supply and JBS Swift.

== History ==
The initial rail lines were installed by the U.S. Navy when it operated what was then the Naval Air Station Olathe. The Navy ceased flight operations at the location in the late 1960s, and by November, 1973, The Johnson County Airport Commission took over operation. When the Commission opened a business park on some of the land, the plan was to let the connecting railroad, at that time the Santa Fe, use those rail lines to service industrial facilities within the park. However, the railroad declined to use the track, due to sharp turns and the overall poor condition of the rails. The New Century AirCenter Railroad was born when the Commission bought its own switch engine, an Army surplus General Electric 80-ton, and provided the service between the businesses and the Santa Fe pickup point.

The commission has since made improvements, such as replacing the GE switcher with a rebuilt-to-order EMD SW8, performing more track maintenance, and adding a ladder track for additional storage capacity. Spurs to new businesses have typically been installed by those businesses as part of the initial construction of their facilities.

The line interchanges with BNSF Railway, and the park is a BNSF Certified Site.
