= Kansas City, Leavenworth and Western Railway =

Interurban trolley line (1900–1938)

Overview
- Headquarters: Wolcott (Kansas City, Kansas)
- Locale: Kansas and Missouri
- Dates of operation: 1900–1938

Technical
- Length: 26 miles (42 km)

The Kansas City, Leavenworth and Western Railway was an electrified interurban trolley which in its final form ran about 26 miles from Leavenworth, Kansas to Kansas City, Missouri. Its original version was created in 1900, and it continued in one form or another until 1938.

== History ==
The company began operating January 16, 1900 as the Kansas City-Leavenworth Railway. Starting from Leavenworth (then the 4th largest city in Kansas), it ran southeast through Lansing. It also passed through the Wolcott community, renamed from Connor or Connor City in honor of H.W. (Herbert) Wolcott, an official of the railway. The headquarters, powerhouse, car barn and repair shops for the railway were all located at Wolcott. Finally, the line terminated in Kansas City, Kansas, where it met the tracks of the Metropolitan Street Railway on Central Avenue. About 40 stops in total were possible on the line, with some in villages, some at intersections, and some at schools. The ride took about an hour, and a round trip over the entire route was just over one dollar. Service ran every hour beginning at 5:15 am and ending at 10:15 pm, operated by five cars. In late 1904, the line arranged to have its cars go directly into Kansas City, Missouri across the river, with that part of the route operated by the Metropolitan Street Railway and costing an extra nickel. At that time, the line extended from Third and Delaware in Leavenworth to Eighth Street and Grand Avenue in downtown Kansas City, Missouri, about 26 miles.

The line was sold in March 1905, and was renamed as the Kansas City Western Railway. While a projected spur to Topeka never happened, the line in the 1910s was busy enough to average 1.2 million passengers a year. Further, freight-hauling services were added to the mix, the principal cargo being milk carried to creameries in Kansas City.

The line entered bankruptcy in 1920 and emerged on February 17 of that year as the Kansas City, Leavenworth and Western Railway. It did well enough to keep operating through freight revenue, commuters, schoolchildren, and other riders. The line was hurt by the Great Depression, but usage held up until late into the 1930s. However, in 1938, the Works Progress Administration acquired a large tract of land in Wyandotte County with the intention to create the Wyandotte County Lake and picnic ground. It was discovered that the trolley tracks traversed this area, and the county condemned the right-of-way. The company could not afford to reroute the tracks or bridge the water feature; so, it declared bankruptcy and abandoned its whole line. Its last day of operation was March 31, 1938. After that, it reorganized as the Kansas City & Leavenworth Transportation Company to provide bus service between Kansas City and Leavenworth, closely following the old trolley route. But that entity too went bankrupt, in 1951.
