= Wabash Valley Railroad =

Shortline railway in Illinois

Overview
- Headquarters: Decatur, Illinois
- Reporting mark: WVRC
- Locale: Central Illinois among others
- Dates of operation: 1977–1981

Technical
- Track gauge: 4 ft 8 1/2 in (1,435 mm) standard gauge

The Wabash Valley Railroad Company (reporting mark WVRC) was a shortline railroad that operated in Illinois from 1977 to 1981. The WVRC was founded under the Illinois Railroad Freight Program and operated by Morrison-Knudsen of Boise, Idaho. The road used rebuilt M-K Geeps and operated a former Pennsylvania Railroad branch between Decatur, IL and Paris, IL. It went out of business after state funding disappeared and another new startup, the Prairie Central Railway, also quit running the line after a few years. It was abandoned in 1984.

On September 1, 1980 the Wabash Valley Railroad Company began operating a second railroad under the same name. The "Kansas Division" utilized two former Rock Island lines within the Sunflower State: one between Phillipsburg, through Belleville, to Mahaska (113.6 miles) and one between Belleville and Manhattan, Kansas (83.1 miles). The former Rock Island depot building in Belleville served as the headquarters for the railroad. The railroad lasted only three months and ceased operation on November 30th 1980.
