= New Century AirCenter =

Airport in Kansas, United States of America

- IATA: JCI; ICAO: KIXD; FAA LID: IXD

Summary
- Airport type: Public
- Owner: Johnson County
- Operator: Johnson County Arpt Comm
- Serves: Olathe, Kansas
- Location: Gardner, Kansas
- Time zone: CST (UTC−06:00)
  - Summer (DST): CDT (UTC−05:00)
- Elevation AMSL: 1,087 ft (331 m)
- Coordinates: 38°49′51″N 094°53′25″W
- Website: https://www.jocogov.org/aircenter

Maps
- FAA diagram

- Location of airport in Kansas IXD (the United States)

Runways
| Direction | Length | | Surface |
| Direction | ft | m | Surface |
|---|---|---|---|
| 4/22 | 5,130 | 1,564 | Asphalt |
| 18/36 | 7,339 | 2,237 | Asphalt |

Statistics
- Aircraft operations (2019): 53,678
- Based aircraft (2020): 47
- Source: Federal Aviation Administration

New Century AirCenter (IATA: JCI, ICAO: KIXD, FAA LID: IXD), formerly known as Naval Air Station Olathe, Flatley Field and Johnson County Industrial Airport, is a joint civil-military general aviation airport located four miles (6 km) southwest of the central business district of Olathe, a city in Johnson County, Kansas, United States. Measured by number of aircraft operations, the facility was the second-busiest airport in the state of Kansas in 2019.

Although most U.S. airports use the same three-letter location identifier for the FAA and IATA, New Century AirCenter is assigned IXD by the FAA and JCI by the IATA (which assigned IXD to Bamrauli Airport in Allahabad, India). The airport's ICAO identifier is KIXD.

The airport’s codes were derived from its name of Johnson County Industrial Airport. The county originally sought the “IND” designation for its “industrial” name but that identifier went to Indianapolis International Airport. The county then sought an “IJC” code based on the Johnson County name but that was rejected as too similar to the OJC code of the neighboring Johnson County Executive Airport (which was previously a naval auxiliary landing field, or NALF, under the control of Naval Air Station Olathe). As a civilian facility, the airport was assigned the closest available industrial code "IXD." The previous FAA code for Naval Air Station Olathe was NUU and the ICAO code KNUU.

== History ==
=== Military use ===
With the departure of Navy Reserve and Marine Corps Reserve flying units, the sole remaining military aviation presence at the airfield is the U.S. Army Reserve's Bravo Company, 7th Battalion, 158th Aviation Regiment, flying the CH-47 Chinook.

=== Civil use ===
The airport was acquired by Johnson County in 1973 and renamed Johnson County Industrial Airport to reflect a new mission of being an industrial park (including the Fred Allenbrand Criminal Justice Complex for Johnson County). On September 28, 1994 the name was changed to New Century AirCenter so as not to minimize its aviation component. In 1995, the Base Realignment and Closure Commission (BRAC) voted to close Naval Air Reserve Center (NAVAIRESCEN) Olathe and consolidate its units and functions at other Naval Air Reserve activities, with all Navy activities ceasing in 1996.

The base was featured in a segment on the A&E Network entitled “Haunted America” in which it is claimed the base is the site of paranormal activity after a Navy pilot crashed into an aircraft hangar next to the airport control tower in the 1950s. According to the report: security guards hear voices, whistles, footsteps on the floor and on overhead catwalks. Locks refuse to stay locked and doors open and close without wind or human intervention and an occasional apparition makes an appearance.

== Facilities and aircraft ==
New Century Aircenter Airport covers an area of 2,600 acres (1,100 ha) which contains two runways:

- Runway 4/22: 5,130 x 100 ft (1,564 x 30 m), Surface: Asphalt
- Runway 18/36: 7,339 x 150 ft (2,237 x 46 m), Surface: Asphalt

For the twelve-month period ending July 31, 2019, the airport had 53,678 aircraft operations, an average of 147 per day: 91% general aviation, 5% air taxi, 4% military, and less than 1% commercial. In March 2020, there were 47 aircraft based at this airport: 23 single-engine, 7 multi-engine, 1 jet, and 16 military.

== Business park ==
After the Johnson County Airport Commission took control of the property, it decided to build a business park on some of the land. Clients include Altiras Chemical LLC, CFS Sauer Foods Inc., IFF Nutrition and Health, deElliotte Company Inc., Steel and Pipe Supply Company Inc., Cedar Creek LLC, Wausau Supply and JBS Swift. The park even has its own railway, the New Century AirCenter Railroad, to supply switching services between the businesses and the connecting rail carrier, the BNSF.

== See also ==
- List of airports in Kansas
