= Omaha, Abilene and Wichita Railway =

Defunct Nebraska railway company

The Omaha, Abilene and Wichita Railway was organized on July 7, 1885, as an extension of the Chicago, Rock Island and Pacific Railway. It went from St. Joseph, Missouri through Topeka, Kansas to Wichita, then connecting to Beatrice, Nebraska. The franchises of the company were sold to the Chicago, Kansas and Nebraska Railroad, a newly created Rock Island subsidiary, in 1886.

== See also ==
- History of Omaha
