= Missouri and Western Railway =

American railroad

Overview
- Locale: Missouri and Kansas
- Dates of operation: 1875–1879

Technical
- Track gauge: 4 ft 8 1/2 in (1,435 mm)
- Length: 83.23 mi (133.95 km)

The Missouri and Western Railway (M&WR) completed a main line from Pierce City, Missouri through Sacoxie and Joplin, Missouri to Oswego, Kansas, with a branch line north from Joplin to Oronogo, Missouri, with a total length of 83.23 miles. The trackage was finished in 1879, and the company was purchased by the St. Louis-San Francisco Railway (Frisco) the same year.

== History ==
The M&WR, formed in 1875, was a consolidation of other railway companies under common ownership, namely the Pierce City and Kansas Railroad Company, a Missouri corporation, and the Oswego and State Line Railroad Company, a Kansas corporation, both formed earlier in 1875. Those companies had been created to take over the franchises and properties of the Memphis, Carthage and Northwestern Railroad Company, an 1872 corporation which was itself a consolidation of earlier companies: the Memphis, Carthage, and Northwestern Railroad Company, and the State Line, Oswego and Southern Kansas Railway Company.

The M&WR proceeded to complete a standard-gauge, single-line railroad between Pierce City and Oswego, about 73 miles, placing Joplin in the middle. A branch line of about 9 miles was constructed between Joplin and the Oronogo junction. The work was completed by 1879. In July of that year, the M&WR’s franchises and properties were sold to the Frisco.
