= Kansas Southwestern Railway =

Railway in Kansas

Overview
- Headquarters: Wichita, Kansas
- Reporting mark: KSW
- Locale: Kansas
- Dates of operation: 1991–2000
- Predecessor: Union Pacific Railroad: Missouri Pacific Railroad
- Successor: Central Kansas Railway

Technical
- Track gauge: 4 ft 8 1/2 in (1,435 mm) standard gauge

The Kansas Southwestern Railway (reporting mark KSW) was a railroad in the U.S. state of Kansas. It was merged into a sister railroad company, the Central Kansas Railway, in 2000. The Central Kansas Railway was later sold to Watco Companies and became the Kansas and Oklahoma Railroad. KSW had a small roster of former Grand Trunk Western Railroad EMD GP9s, 4544, 4557, 4912 and 4916. Most were painted in a red, white and blue paint scheme. Its headquarters were located in Wichita, Kansas. Much of the track was former Missouri Pacific, spun off by Union Pacific in 1991.
