= Hutchinson and Southern Railway =

The Hutchinson and Southern Railway
Overview
- Locale: Kansas and Oklahoma
- Dates of operation: 1897–1899

Technical
- Track gauge: 4 ft 8 1/2 in (1,435 mm) standard gauge
- Length: 141.9 miles (228.4 km)

The Hutchinson and Southern Railway was incorporated under the general laws of the State of Kansas on December 21, 1897. On January 21, 1898, it acquired at foreclosure the assets of the Hutchinson and Southern Railroad Company, which had built 90.7 miles of trackage from Hutchinson, Kansas south through Kingman, Kansas and Anthony, Kansas to terminate at Wakita, Oklahoma. In the 1898-1899 timeframe, it also acquired all the assets of the Gulf Railroad Company, which had built 36.7 miles of track from Wakita to Blackwell, Oklahoma.

In 1899 the railway built 14.5 miles of track from Blackwell to Ponca City, Oklahoma. The entire line was sold to the Atchison, Topeka and Santa Fe Railway on December 20, 1899. The line has since been abandoned.
