= Kansas City and Pacific Railroad =

Defunct railway in Kansas and Oklahoma, United States

Overview
- Locale: Kansas and Oklahoma
- Dates of operation: 1886–1889

Technical
- Track gauge: 4 ft 8 1/2 in (1,435 mm)
- Length: 130 mi (210 km)

The Kansas City and Pacific Railroad (“KC&PR”) was created in 1886 to provide a freight access route from Kansas City south through what was then Oklahoma Territory, now the State of Oklahoma. The line grew to 130 miles of trackage before the company was merged in 1899 into a predecessor of former class-1 rail carrier Missouri–Kansas–Texas Railroad.

== History ==
=== Parsons and Pacific Railroad ===
The prehistory of the KC&PR may be said to begin with the Parsons and Pacific Railroad, which was incorporated in Kansas on December 16, 1885. It constructed a line of about 31.25 miles between Parsons, Kansas and Coffeyville, Kansas. That railroad was sold to the KC&PR on July 27, 1887.

=== KC&PR ===
The KC&PR was incorporated in Kansas on July 24, 1886. The objective was to get the right to build south through Oklahoma, and toward that goal the railroad secured a grant from the U.S. Congress to do so, dated May 14, 1888. The grant came with stipulations as to meeting certain milestones of progress over time. The KC&PR started from the Kansas/Oklahoma border, but instead of building the line south, it turned most of its attention to securing a connection north to Kansas City. It incorporated the line obtained from the Parsons and Pacific Railroad with additional trackage to create a route between Coffeyville, Kansas and Paola, Kansas, about 125 miles. The only progress it made in the other direction was a route about 5 miles south from Coffeyville, only about 2.7 miles of which was actually in Oklahoma. This gave the railroad about 130 miles of owned line. But the railroad also obtained a traffic arrangement with the Kansas City, Fort Scott and Memphis Railroad which allowed KC&PR trains to go all the way into Kansas City. The KC&PR went back to Congress in 1890 to get an extension of time to build into Oklahoma. On March 28, 1890, the KC&PR was granted two years from May 14, 1890 (i.e., until May 14, 1892) to build its first hundred miles of line in Oklahoma, and two years after that to complete all Oklahoma trackage.

=== Sale ===
But the Oklahoma extension was not to be. The railroad was valuable to what became the Missouri-Kansas-Texas Railroad, known as the “Katy,” because of those traffic rights into Kansas City. So on November 24, 1899, the KC&PR was consolidated with the Missouri, Kansas and Texas Railway Company (an 1865 corporation) to form a new Missouri, Kansas and Texas Railway Company. While the Katy had other lines in Oklahoma, neither the KC&PR nor the new Missouri, Kansas and Texas Railway Company built any additional Oklahoma trackage.
