= Boot Hill and Western Railway =

Railway in Kansas

Boot Hill and Western
Overview
- Headquarters: Wright, Kansas
- Reporting mark: BHW
- Locale: Ford County, Kansas

Technical
- Length: 10 mi (16 km)

The Boot Hill and Western Railway (abbreviated to BHWY), was originally a railway between Dodge City through Wilroads to Bucklin, all in Kansas, owned by the Boot Hill and Western Railway Company. It consisted of a single track section, about 26 miles (42 km) long.

It mainly transports agricultural products and has two interchanges, one with the BNSF Railway and another with the Cimarron Valley Railroad. The railway was given an exemption notice in 2005. Transport between Bucklin and Wilroads stopped in Autumn 2005 due to a lack of traffic, it has only operated eight trains since September 2000. The Boot Hill and Western Railway Company acquired part ownership of the track in September 2000 from the previous owner, the Dodge City Ford and Bucklin Railroad Company. It previously had a role in the interconnection with the Bucklin Union Pacific Railroad.

By 2024, the official Kansas Department of Transportation’s Kansas Railroad Map 2024 was showing the Boot Hill and Western as a 10-mile railway, with 9 miles running east-southeast from Dodge City to Wilroads, and the line extending in the same direction just a bit past Wilroads.
