= Kansas City Outer Belt and Electric Railroad =

The Kansas City Outer Belt and Electric Railroad (“Outer Belt”) was, despite its name, neither an electric railway nor any sort of interurban line. It was intended to be the final link in the Kansas City, Kansas (“KCK”) area for the Kansas City, Mexico & Orient Railway (“KCM&O”) project. However, it was never completed.

== History ==
Work on the KCM&O, which was intended to link KCK to its closest Pacific port, Topolobampo, Mexico, had begun on several disjoined segments in July 1900. However, because of the projected cost of building a large terminal at KCK, the northernmost segment of the KCM&O was started at Wichita, Kansas, heading south. The Kansas City Outer Belt & Electric Railroad Company, which was formed May 20, 1902 in Kansas, was intended to furnish the entrance into KCK, along with terminal facilities for the KCM&O. When completed, it would have been 7 miles long with extensive yards at each end, with two hundred acres of factory sites.

Toward this goal, first mortgage bonds were issued in 1903, land was leased, and work was done between 1905 and 1907 on the intended route, including construction of reinforced concrete structures such as culverts and abutments. Operation over the line was expected to be by conventional steam power, not electric power, despite the company's name.

However, the Outer Belt fell into receivership along with the rest of the KCM&O effort in 1912. The purchaser of the KCM&O in a 1914 foreclosure sale intended to finish the Wichita-to-KCK segment, but did not; and, the extensive land leases that had been obtained by the Outer Belt began lapsing. An entity called the Kansas and Missouri Railway and Terminal Company, which was incorporated in Kansas on November 15, 1922, bought the assets of Outer Belt out of a subsequent foreclosure sale. That entity, at first partially and later completely owned by the Kansas City Southern Railway (KCS), ended up with 5.56 miles of track, and began a switching operation among various other railroads on July 1. 1924. It was merged into the KCS on July 6, 1992.
