= Crawford County Railroad =

The Crawford County Railroad ran from Girard to Walnut in Crawford County, Kansas, United States. It was established on February 6, 1884, from the failed Nebraska, Topeka, Iola and Memphis Railroad. The Crawford County Railroad lasted for nine days before being acquired by the Kansas Southern Railroad.
