= Central Branch Union Pacific Railroad =

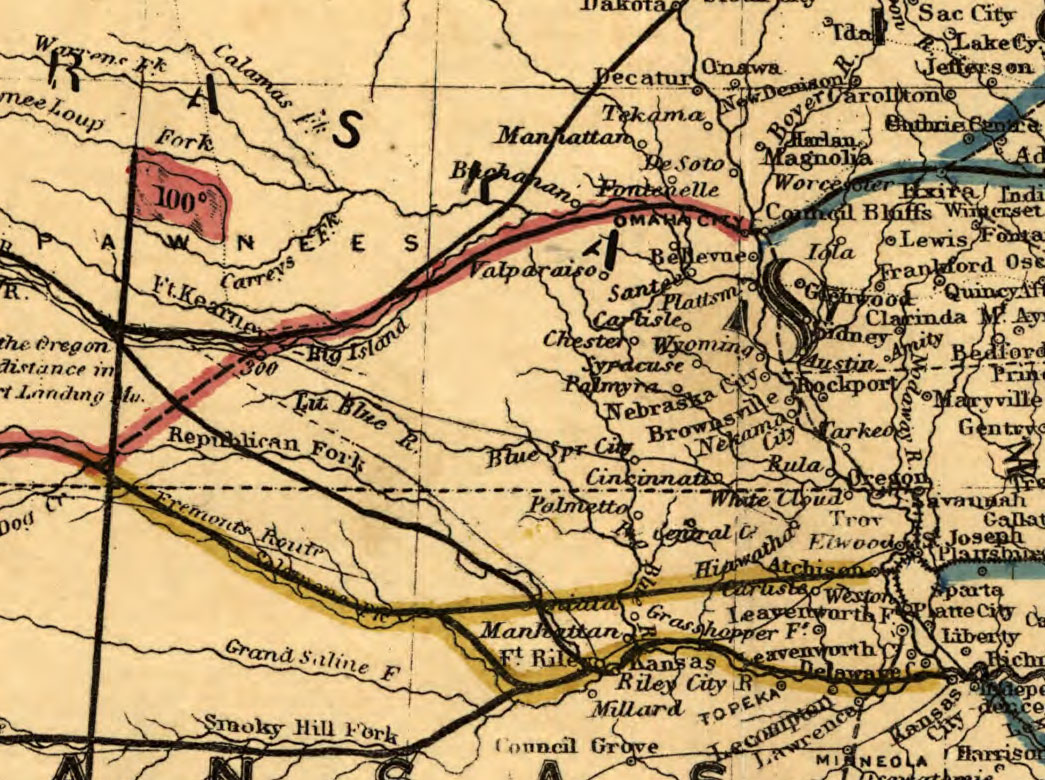
Map showing the Central Branch and Eastern Division (both yellow) meeting near Clay Center, Kansas

The Central Branch Union Pacific Railroad was a railroad in the U.S. state of Kansas. Originally planned as a line from Atchison west into Colorado, and given federal land grants by the Pacific Railway Act of 1862 as one of the branches of the Union Pacific Railroad, it was left with a hanging end at Waterville, Kansas, when the Union Pacific Railway, Eastern Division, with which it was to connect, changed its route. The line was acquired by the Union Pacific through a stock purchase by Jay Gould and leased to the Missouri Pacific Railroad in 1880. In 1909 the Central Branch was merged into the Missouri Pacific; the latter company came back into the Union Pacific system in 1982. In 1991 the remaining trackage west of Frankfort was leased to the Kyle Railroad.

Despite its name, the Central Branch Union Pacific was not associated with the Union Pacific until 1880; it was to be one of several eastern branches of the First transcontinental railroad, of which the Union Pacific constituted the main line between Council Bluffs, Iowa/Omaha, Nebraska, and Ogden, Utah, where it connected with the Central Pacific Railroad.

== History ==
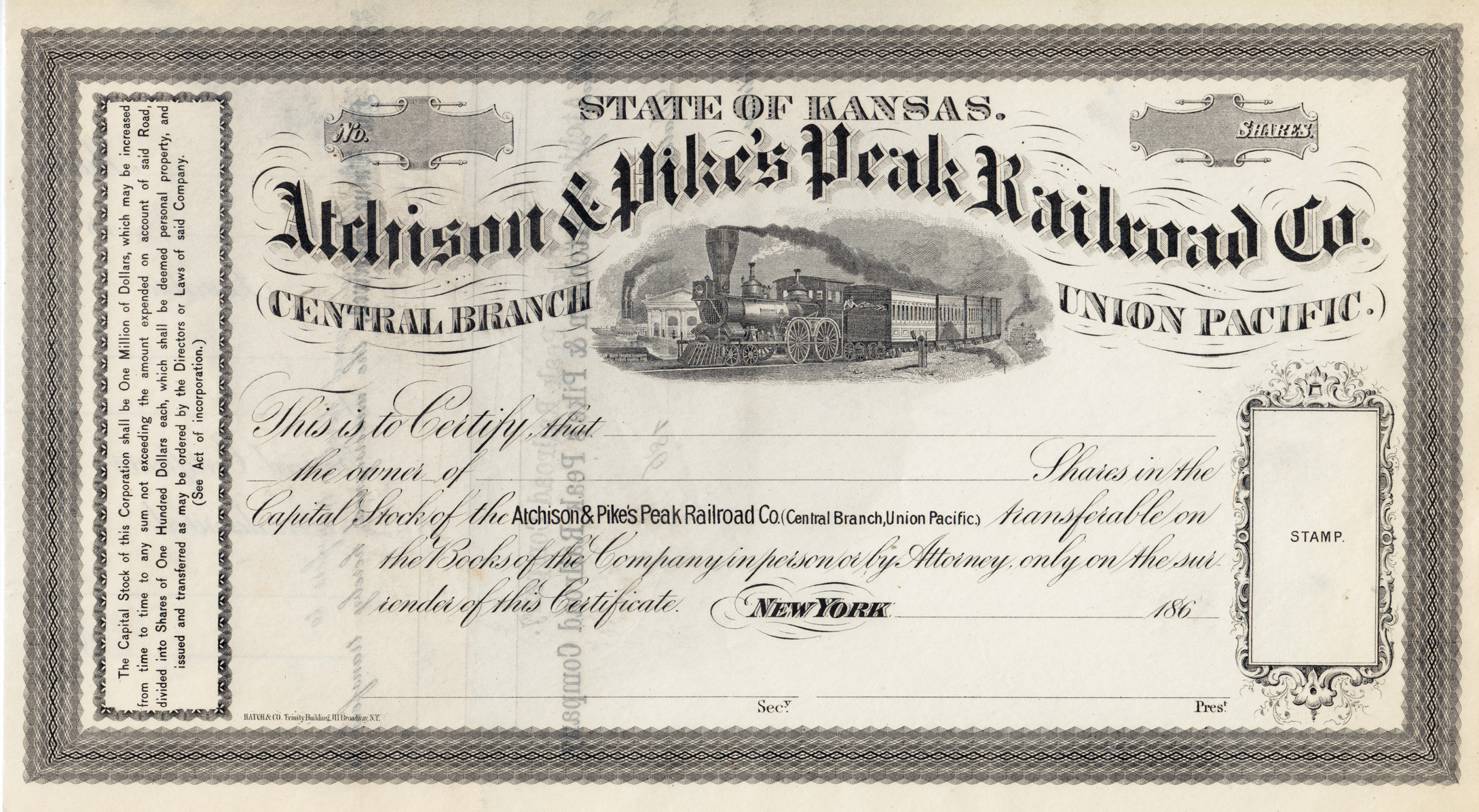
Atchison & Pike's Peak RR Company stock certificate

The Kansas Territorial Legislature incorporated the Central Branch as the Atchison and Pike's Peak Railroad in February 1859, with the power to build from Atchison, on the Missouri River, west to the Kansas-Colorado line in the direction of Pike's Peak or Denver. Through an 1862 treaty between the Kickapoo Indians and U.S. government, part of that tribe's land was sold to the railroad company. It acquired more land from the land grant provisions of the Pacific Railway Act of 1862, which included a line to be built by the Hannibal and St. Joseph Railroad of Missouri, extending west from Atchison. The west end of this branch would be at an intersection with the Leavenworth, Pawnee and Western Railroad, a planned connection from Kansas City to the main transcontinental line. The company would only receive land for the first 100 miles (160 km) from Atchison. The Hannibal and St. Joseph transferred its rights under the act to the Atchison and Pike's Peak in January 1864. Construction began in 1865, and the line was completed from Atchison west for 40 miles (64 km) in January 1867, and the rest of the 100 miles to Waterville in January 1868. The company changed its name to Central Branch Union Pacific Railroad in January 1867, better reflecting its purpose.

Unfortunately for the Central Branch, the Union Pacific Railway, Eastern Division (formerly the Leavenworth, Pawnee and Western) was authorized in 1866 to build west into Colorado, leaving the Central Branch with a hanging end at Waterville. After failing to get land grants for an extension along the Eastern Division's original route into Nebraska, the Central Branch turned its sights to local traffic. Several extensions and branches were built and leased in the late 1870s, beginning with the Waterville and Washington Railroad, incorporated in April 1876 and completed to Washington and leased to the Central Branch in December. Afterwards came the Republican Valley Rail Way from Greenleaf to Concordia (incorporated November 1876, leased 1877), Atchison, Solomon Valley and Denver Railway from Concordia to Cawker City (incorporated May 1878, leased August 1878), and Atchison and Denver Railway from Cawker City to Kirwin, with grading to Lenora (incorporated December 1878). The Atchison, Solomon Valley and Denver also built a branch from Downs (on the Atchison and Denver) to Alton, and the Atchison, Republican Valley and Pacific Railway (incorporated May 1878, leased January 1879) began construction of a branch into Nebraska, leaving the main line at Yuma and initially ending at Scandia. All five companies were merged in December 1879 as the Atchison, Colorado and Pacific Railroad, a non-operating subsidiary of the Central Branch that subsequently completed the line to Lenora and extended the branch from Scandia to Warwick. Completing the system of branches in Kansas was one more company: the Atchison, Jewell County and Western Railroad from Jamestown to Burr Oak (incorporated July 1879, leased March 1880).

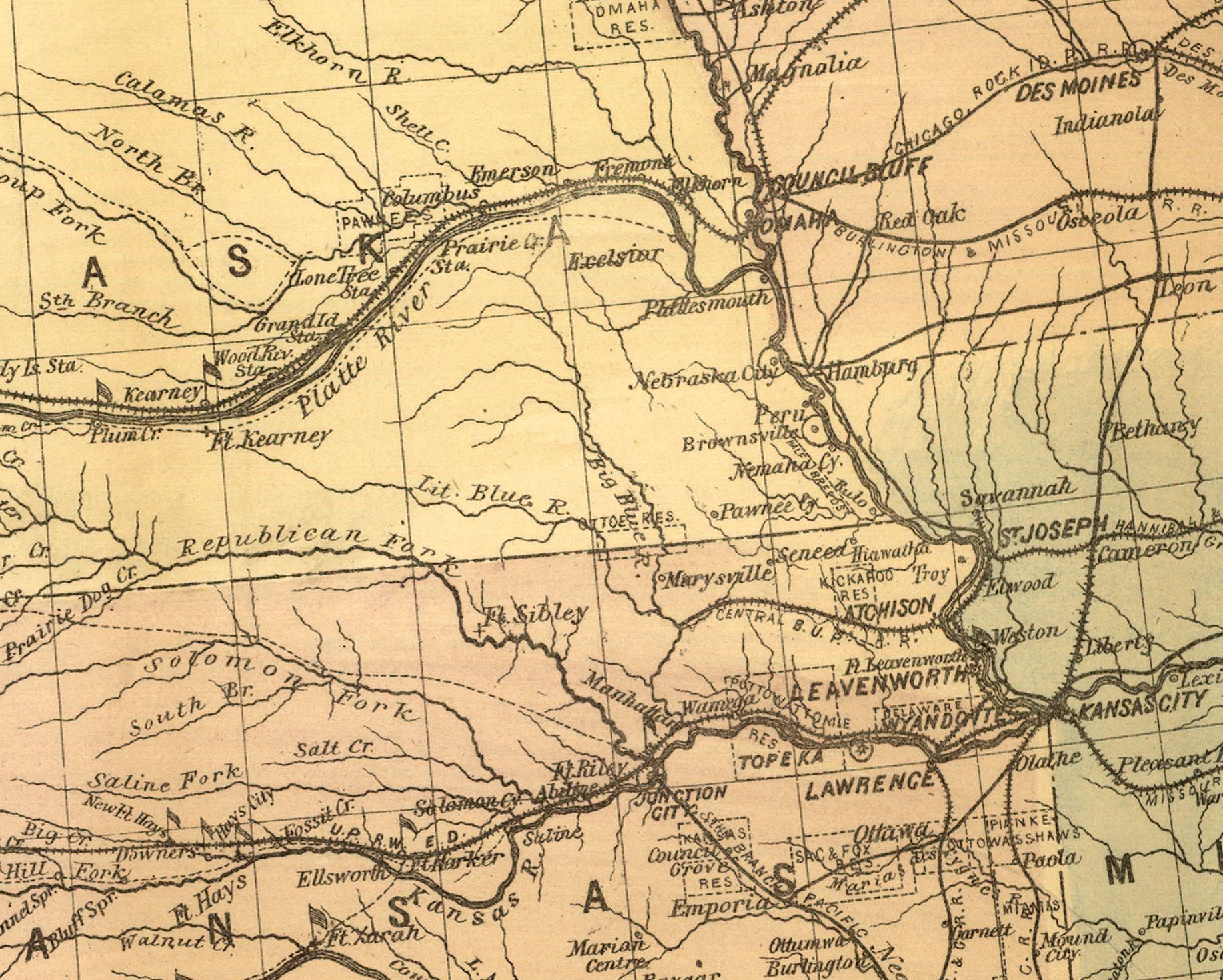
Map of the lines as built

Jay Gould, who controlled the Kansas Pacific Railway (the new name for the old Leavenworth, Pawnee and Western), desired control of the Central Branch to avoid competition between eastern Kansas and Denver. He acquired a majority of stock in the Central Branch and its leased lines from Oliver Ames who was the primary share holder, turning it over in January 1880 to the Kansas Pacific, which was immediately merged into the Union Pacific Railway. In December 1880, Gould leased the system to the Missouri Pacific Railway (MoPac), another company that he controlled, which had a north-south line through Atchison. The final extension of the Central Branch in Kansas was the Rooks County Railroad from Alton to Stockton, incorporated March 1885 under MoPac ownership and leased November 1885. In order to extend the Warwick branch into Nebraska, the MoPac incorporated the Pacific Railway in Kansas and Pacific Railway in Nebraska in March 1887, and in September the former was sold to the latter. The MoPac began operating the line from Warwick to Superior, Nebraska, in October 1887, and it was completed to Prosser in April 1888. A separate Pacific Railway was incorporated in Nebraska in December 1887 to continue the line northwest to the western boundary of the state in Sioux County, but this was never built, and Prosser would remain the end of the line.

The Union Pacific went bankrupt after the Panic of 1893, and the Central Branch immediately followed, entering receivership in October 1893. It was sold under foreclosure in June 1898 to a new Central Branch Union Pacific Railway (replacing the old Central Branch Union Pacific Railroad), and the other two UP subsidiaries were similarly reorganized in December 1898 as the Atchison, Colorado and Pacific Railway and Atchison, Jewell County and Western Railway. The three were consolidated in July 1899 as the Central Branch Railway, now owned by the newly independent MoPac. Finally, on May 29, 1909, the Central Branch Railway and Rooks County Railroad were merged, along with a number of other subsidiaries, into the MoPac. On August 12, 1909, board of directors authorized and on January 18, 1910, the stockholders ratified the purchase of the property of the Pacific Railway in Nebraska (which began at Warwick, Kansas). For many years, MoPac operated the system as the Northern Kansas Division, with a main line from Atchison to Downs, but in 1991 the Union Pacific (which had acquired the MoPac) leased, among other lines, the old Central Branch west of Frankfort to the Kyle Railroad. The UP abandoned the line east of Vliets in 1990, and the short stub from Frankfort to Vliets in 2004; Kyle operations between Frankfort and Ames were discontinued in 2001. The line from Ames west to Stockton remains, owned by UP and operated by Kyle.
