= Kansas and Oklahoma Railroad =

American shortline railroad

Kansas and Oklahoma Railroad (K&O)

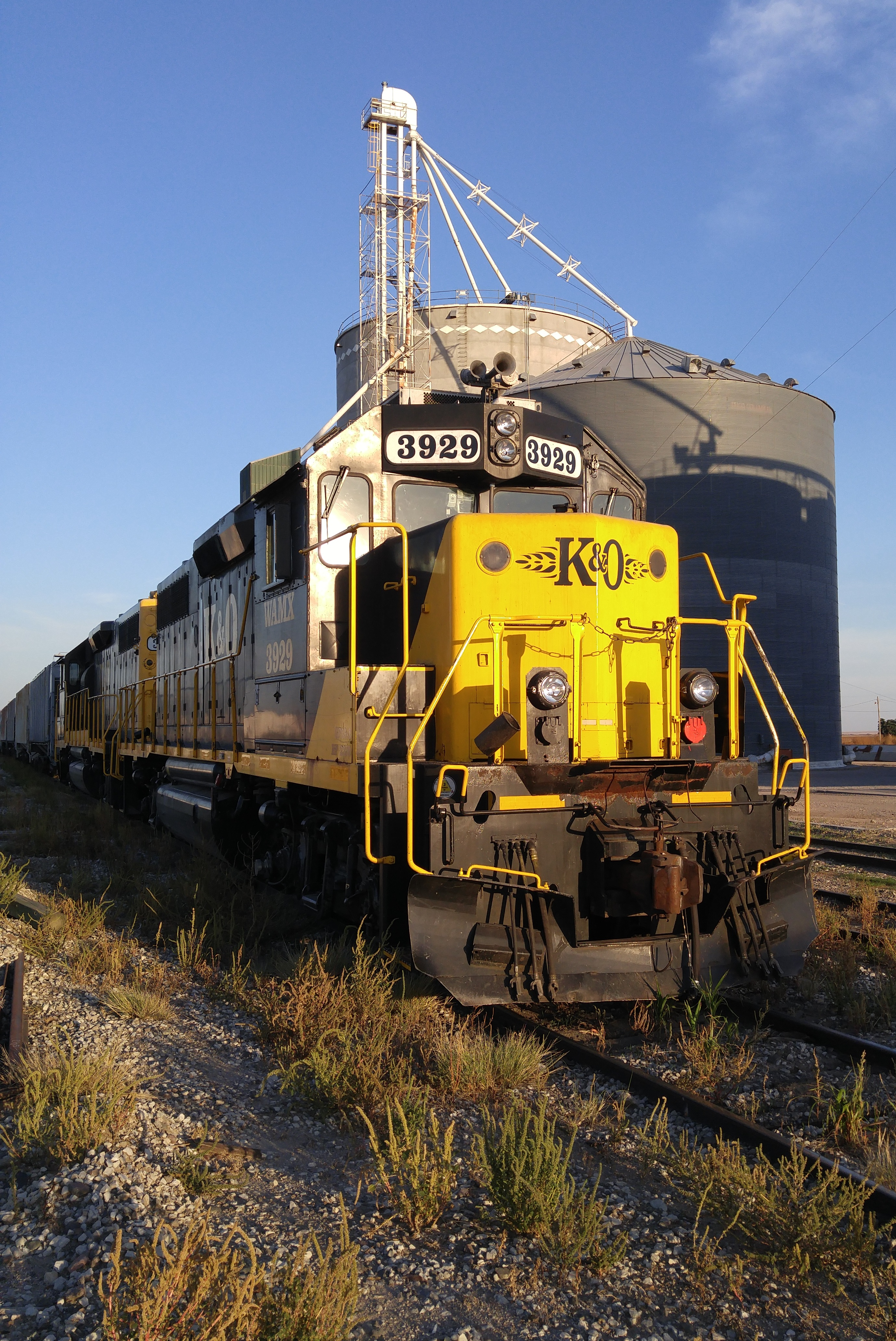
- K&O Railroad locomotive at Ness City, Kansas

Overview
- Parent company: Watco
- Headquarters: Wichita, Kansas
- Reporting mark: KO
- Locale: Kansas, extending into Colorado
- Dates of operation: 2001–present
- Predecessor: Central Kansas Railway

Technical
- Track gauge: 4 ft 8 1/2 in (1,435 mm) standard gauge
- Length: 820 miles (1,320 kilometres)

The Kansas and Oklahoma Railroad (reporting mark KO) is a shortline railroad operating in the Midwestern United States.

It is entirely located in Kansas and, despite its name, owns no trackage in Oklahoma.

== Overview ==
The KO is a subsidiary of Watco, which took over the operations of the Central Kansas Railway (CKRY) on June 29, 2001. The CKRY property (which by this time included the merged Kansas Southwestern Railway) was purchased from OmniTRAX and named the Kansas & Oklahoma Railroad.

The KO consists of trackage radiating north and west from their headquarters at Wichita, Kansas. Most of this trackage was originally operated by the Atchison, Topeka & Santa Fe, although a few segments were originally operated by the Missouri Pacific.

The tracks Kansas & Oklahoma RR operate on also includes portions of the former Missouri Pacific Kansas City to Pueblo main line in Western Kansas and Eastern Colorado.

KO owns 820 miles (1,320 km) of track, and another 84 miles (135 km) is accounted for in trackage rights.

== Subdivisions ==
As of July 2023, the K&O consists of the following subdivisions:

- Hutchinson Subdivision (Wichita, Kansas to Hutchinson, Kansas)
- Conway Springs Subdivision (Wichita, Kansas to Kingman, Kansas via Conway Springs, Kansas)
- Kingman Subdivision (Garden Plain, Kansas to Pratt, Kansas)
- Isabel Subdivision (Coats, Kansas to Graham, Kansas)
- Great Bend Subdivision (Hutchinson, Kansas to Larned, Kansas)
- Geneseo Subdivision (Sterling, Kansas to Geneseo, Kansas)
- Scott City Subdivision (Great Bend, Kansas to Scott City, Kansas)
- Hoisington Subdivision (Geneseo, Kansas to McCracken, Kansas and Healy, Kansas to Towner, Colorado)
- Salina Subdivision (Salina, Kansas to Osborne, Kansas)
- McPherson Subdivision (McPherson, Kansas to Conway, Kansas)
- Newton Subdivision (Newton, Kansas to McPherson, Kansas)

== See also ==
- Marion and McPherson Railroad – Defunct railroad of which K&O currently uses the parts that have not been abandoned
