= Central Kansas Railway =

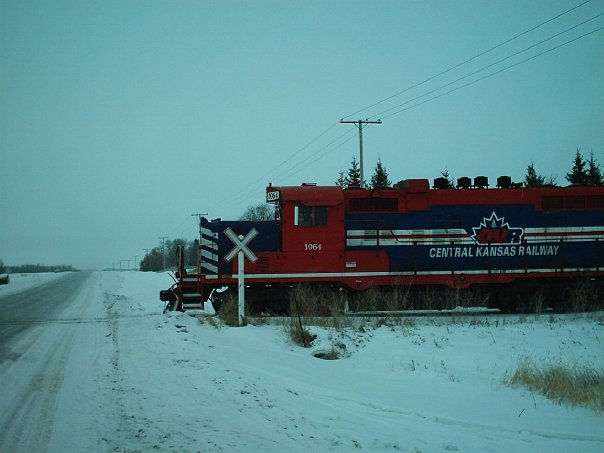
- Central Kansas Railway / Okanagan Valley Railway EMD GP10 rolls past grade crossing near Prince Albert, Saskatchewan, Canada

Overview
- Parent company: OmniTRAX
- Headquarters: Wichita, Kansas
- Reporting mark: CKRY
- Locale: Kansas
- Dates of operation: 1993–2001
- Predecessor: Atchison, Topeka and Santa Fe Railway (1993); Kansas Southwestern Railway (2000)
- Successor: Kansas and Oklahoma Railroad

Technical
- Track gauge: 4 ft 8 1/2 in (1,435 mm) standard gauge

The Central Kansas Railway (CKR) (reporting mark CKRY) was a short-line railroad operating 900 miles (1,400 km) of trackage in the U.S. state of Kansas and west to Scott City, Kansas. All trackage was former Atchison, Topeka and Santa Fe Railway branchlines in Kansas and northern Oklahoma. The Kansas Southwestern Railway, a sister company which operated former Missouri Pacific Railroad branchlines in Kansas, was merged into the CKR in 2000. Owned by Omnitrax, CKR's main business was from the Kansas wheat harvests, as well as other traffic.

Declining harvest quantities and increased shipments by truck hurt the company financially for a few years; Mike Babcock of Kansas State University, whose research is rail transportation in Kansas, noted that more grain was being shipped by truck than by rail in 1998. The railroad sought loans, grants, tax relief and any governmental assistance they could get to help allay their costs of operation and maintenance. In 2000, the railroad planned to abandon 255 miles (410 km) of track.

Watco purchased all of the CKR's lines on May 31, 2001, and formed the Kansas and Oklahoma Railroad.
