= Eric K. Meyer =

American journalism professor and newspaper publisher (b. 1953)

- Meyer on October 14, 2026
- Born: August 23, 1953 (age 73); Marion, Kansas
- Education: University of Kansas (B.S.) 1975 Marquette University (M.A) 1998
- Occupation: Journalist
- Parents: Bill Meyer (father); Joan Meyer (mother)

Eric K. Meyer (born August 23, 1953) is an American associate professor of journalism at the University of Illinois at Urbana-Champaign and a newspaper publisher. He is also a former associate dean for academic and administrative affairs with the university's College of Media.

== Biography ==
Meyer was born in Marion, Kansas. His first newspaper was the "Meyer Messenger", which he created as a child. He photocopied the homemade newspaper and distributed it to residents of his neighborhood. Meyer earned a Bachelor of Science degree in journalism from the University of Kansas in 1975 and earned a Master of Arts degree in journalism from Marquette University in 1998.

From 1975 to 1977 Meyer worked as a Sunday edition editor, assistant news editor and reporter for Illinois' Bloomington Pantagraph, and later as a news photo and graphics editor, assistant news editor, systems editor, copy desk chief and reporter for the Milwaukee Journal from 1977 to 1994.

Meyer, a former adjunct lecturer at Marquette University, is an associate professor of journalism at the University of Illinois, where he has been a member of the faculty since 1996. His primary duties include teaching information graphics, page layout and design, and online journalism. He also is associate dean for academic affairs and administration in U of I's College of Media.

Meyer started working at Marion County Record in fifth grade, and became an owner with his parents in 1998. At the time he taught at University of Illinois at Urbana-Champaign and sometimes helped out at the paper during school breaks. In 2020, Meyer visited his hometown during spring break and didn't return to campus due to COVID-19 pandemic in the United States. He taught classes online for a year and retired after growing frustrated with online learning and not wanting to teach a hybrid class.

He is the former owner of NewsLink, an online resource to national and international news publication websites, including resources to newspapers, magazines, radio, television, and blogs. Meyer is president and majority owner of Hoch Publishing Co., publisher of Marion County Record, Hillsboro Star-Journal and the Peabody Gazette-Bulletin. He is the third of three family generations in the newspaper business.

On Friday, August 11, 2023, four local police officers and two sheriff's deputies raided the office of the Marion County Record newspaper; the home of its co-owners, Eric Meyer and his 98-year-old mother, Joan Meyer; and the home of Marion vice mayor Ruth Herbel, 80. They seized computers, cell phones, and other equipment. Joan Meyer was unable to eat or sleep after the raid; she collapsed Saturday afternoon and died at her home. The Record planned to file a federal lawsuit against the city and collaborating law enforcement agencies. Marion County police defended their raid, citing a First Amendment exception for suspected criminal activity - alleged identity theft in the paper's earlier report regarding a Marion restaurateur's liquor license and drunken driving charge.

== Published works ==
Books:

- Designing Infographics (January 1997, Hayden Books, ISBN 1568303394).

Other work:

- Executive producer, Project on the State of the American Newspaper (1998–2000).
- Co-publisher, American Journalism Review online (1996–2001).
- Author, Tomorrow's News Today: A Guide to Strategic Planning for Online Publishing (1995–2000, nine editions)
