= Wilson Township, Kansas =

Wilson Township may refer to several places in the U.S. state of Kansas:

- Wilson Township, Ellsworth County, Kansas
- Wilson Township, Lane County, Kansas
- Wilson Township, Marion County, Kansas
- Wilson Township, Rice County, Kansas

See also

- Wilson Township (disambiguation)
