= Wilson Township, Arkansas =

Wilson Township, Arkansas may refer to:

- Wilson Township, Clay County, Arkansas
- Wilson Township, Faulkner County, Arkansas
- Wilson Township, Fulton County, Arkansas
- Wilson Township, Pope County, Arkansas
- Wilson Township, Stone County, Arkansas

== See also ==
- List of townships in Arkansas
- Wilson Township (disambiguation)
