= Aulne, Kansas =

Unincorporated community in Marion County, Kansas

- Unincorporated community
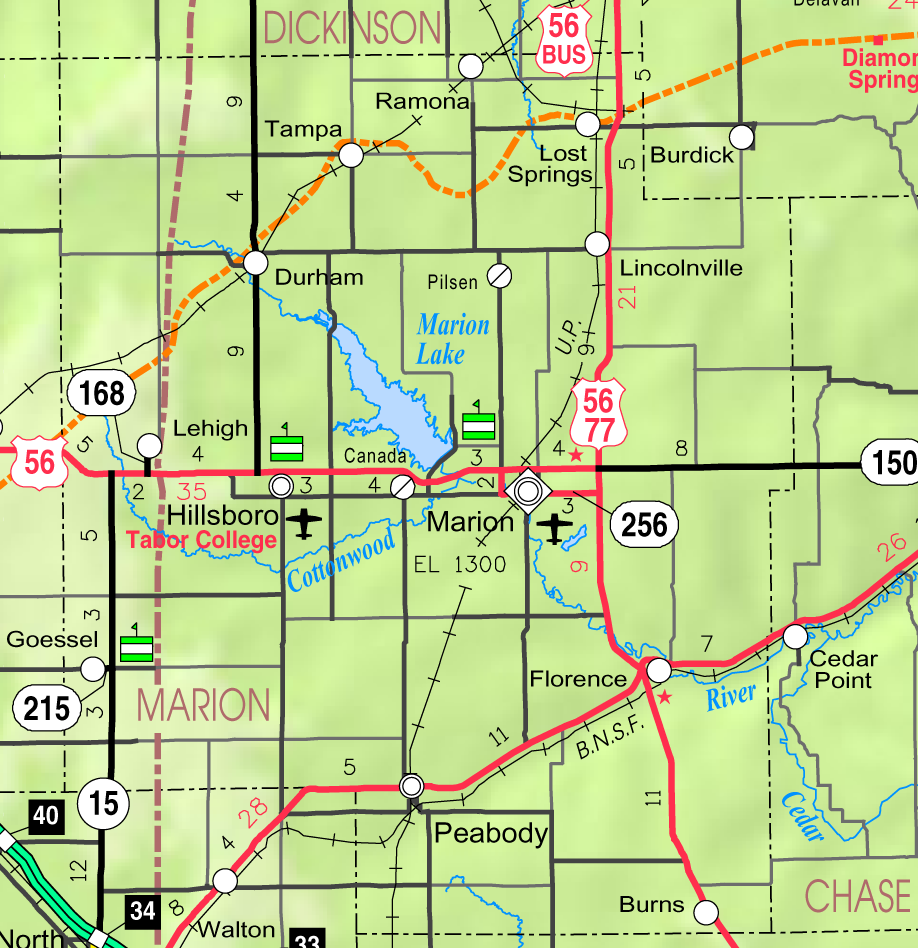
- KDOT map of Marion County (legend)

- Location within Kansas Location within the United States
- Coordinates: 38°16′34″N 97°04′36″W
- Country: United States
- State: Kansas
- County: Marion
- Township: Wilson
- Founded: 1887
- Platted: 1887
- Elevation: 1,408 ft (429 m)
- Time zone: UTC-6 (CST)
  - Summer (DST): UTC-5 (CDT)
- ZIP Code: 66861
- Area code: 620
- FIPS code: 20-03400
- GNIS ID: 477370

Aulne is an unincorporated community in Marion County, Kansas, United States. The Aulne name was suggested by officials of the railroad when it was built through Aulne during the 19th century. It is located southwest of Marion at the intersection of Pawnee Road and 140th Street, adjacent to the Union Pacific Railroad.

== History ==
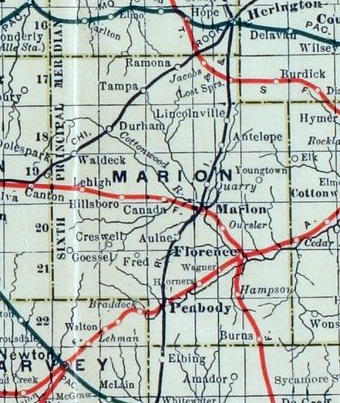
1915 railroad map of Marion County

=== Early history ===
For many millennia, the Great Plains of North America was inhabited by nomadic Native Americans. From the 16th century to 18th century, the Kingdom of France claimed ownership of large parts of North America. In 1762, after the French and Indian War, France secretly ceded New France to Spain, per the Treaty of Fontainebleau.

=== 19th century ===
In 1802, Spain returned most of the land to France. In 1803, most of the land for modern day Kansas was acquired by the United States from France as part of the 828,000 square mile Louisiana Purchase for 2.83 cents per acre.

In 1854, the Kansas Territory was organized, then in 1861 Kansas became the 34th U.S. state. In 1855, Marion County was established within the Kansas Territory, which included the land for modern day Aulne.

In 1872, a railroad contractor, named Col. W. Sherburn, decided the location would be good location for a town and named it after himself, Sherburn, but it was too early and never used.

In 1887, the Chicago, Kansas and Nebraska Railway built a branch line north–south from Herington through Aulne to Caldwell. It foreclosed in 1891 and was taken over by Chicago, Rock Island and Pacific Railway, which shut down in 1980, and reorganized as Oklahoma, Kansas and Texas Railroad which merged in 1988 with Missouri Pacific Railroad, and finally merged in 1997 with Union Pacific Railroad. Most locals still refer to this railroad as the "Rock Island".

A post office existed in Aulne from August 19, 1887, to February 28, 1954.

=== 20th century ===
Aulne was one of the finalist communities considered for Tabor College before it was established in Hillsboro in 1908.

During World War I, the local telephone company decreed that "No German could be spoken over the telephones", because of anti-German sentiment towards German-Americans.

== Geography ==
Aulne is located at coordinates 38.2761266, -97.0766933 in the scenic Flint Hills and Great Plains of the state of Kansas. It is roughly halfway between Marion and Peabody next to the Union Pacific Railroad.

== Area attractions ==
- Aulne United Methodist Church, north-east corner of 140th St and Pawnee Rd.
- 1890 Marion County Poor Farm (asylum), 1 mi west, 2.1 mi north. Large 3-story limestone house, now privately owned house, occasional tours by appointment. Darren E. Burrows lived here briefly as a child. Indigent, and somewhat "incompetent" people would live here with adult supervision, work the land, raise their own food, and earn their keep. Unwed pregnant girls could stay there until they delivered their babies, which were put up of adoption. The asylum was self-sustaining for a number of years, even paying taxes to the county.
- Marion Reservoir, approximately seven miles north of Aulne.

== Education ==
The community is served by Marion–Florence USD 408 public school district. All students attend schools in Marion. The high school is a member of T.E.E.N., a shared video teaching network between five area high schools.

- Marion High School, located in Marion.
- Marion Middle School, located in Marion.
- Marion Elementary School, located in Marion.

== Media ==
=== Print ===
- Marion County Record, newspaper from Marion.
- Hillsboro Free Press, free newspaper for greater Marion County area.

== Infrastructure ==
=== Transportation ===
U.S. Route 56 is 5.75 miles (9.25 km) to the north, U.S. Route 50 is 7 miles (11 km) to the south, and U.S. Route 77 is 4.5 miles (7.2 km) east of the community. The Oklahoma Kansas Texas (OKT) line of the Union Pacific Railroad passes through the community, but no longer has a side-spur at Aulne.

The Rock Island Railroad formerly provided passenger rail service to Aulne on their mainline from Minneapolis to Houston until at least 1951.

=== Utilities ===
- Internet
  - Satellite is provided by HughesNet, StarBand, WildBlue.
- TV
  - Satellite is provided by DirecTV, Dish Network.
  - Terrestrial is provided by regional digital TV stations.
- Electricity
  - Community and Rural areas provided by Flint Hills RECA.
- Water
  - Community and Rural areas provided by Marion County RWD #4 (map).

== Notable people ==
- Floyd B. Danskin, American politician, Washington State House of Representatives from 1921 to 1933, and Speaker of the House from 1925 to 1927.
