= Burns, Kansas =

City in Marion County, Kansas

- City
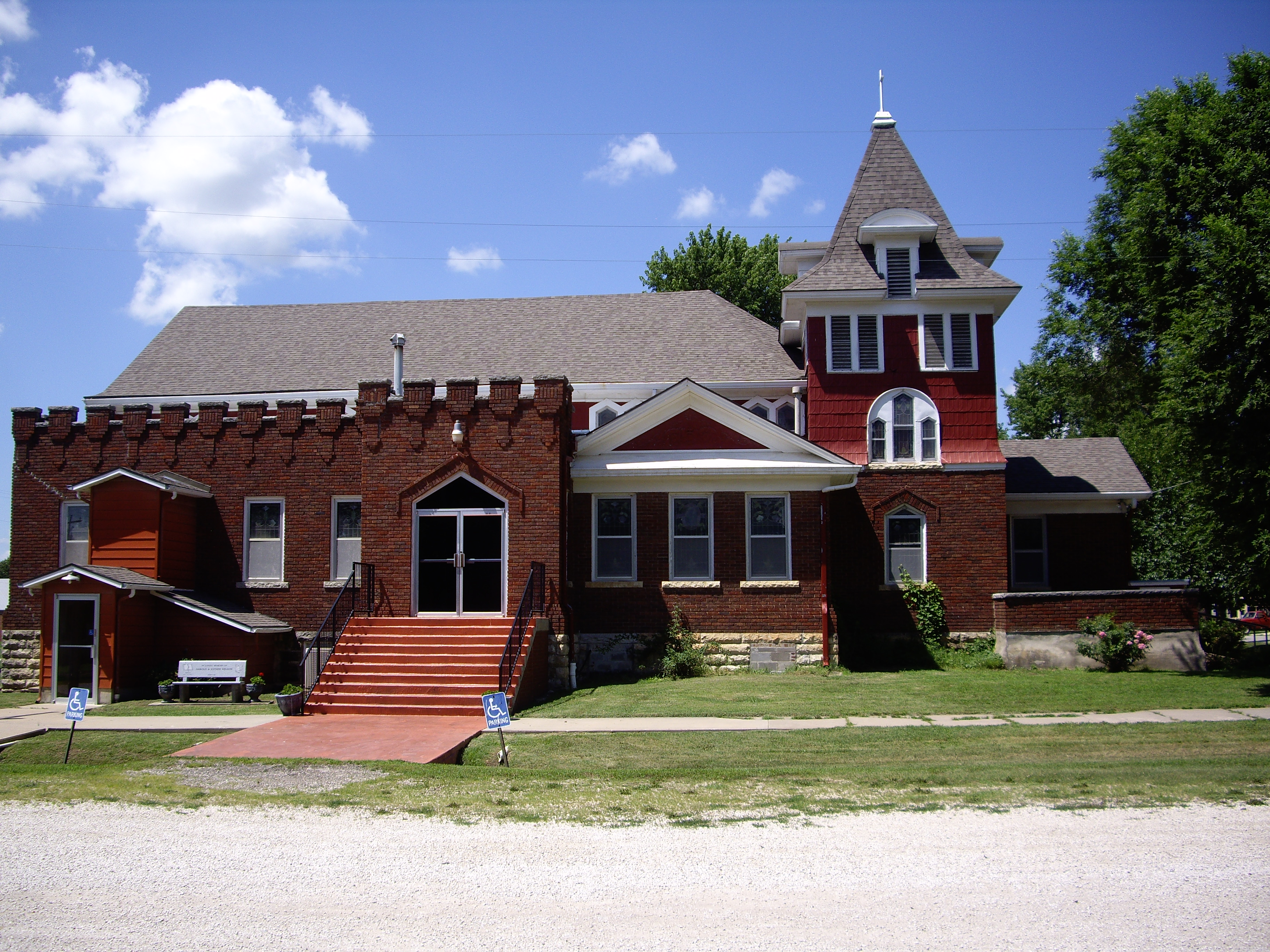
- Burns United Methodist Church (2010)

- Location within Marion County and Kansas

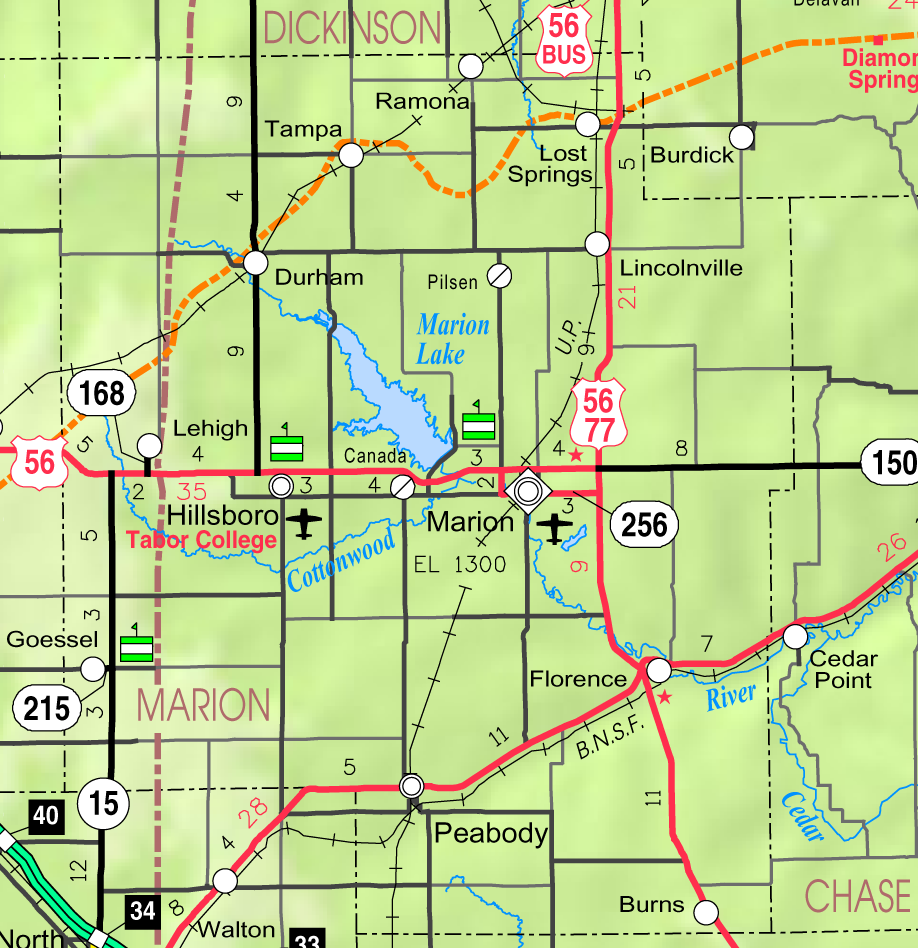
- KDOT map of Marion County (legend)
- Coordinates: 38°05′23″N 96°53′16″W
- Country: United States
- State: Kansas
- County: Marion
- Township: Milton
- Platted: 1880
- Incorporated: 1905
- Named for: Train station

Government
  - Type: Mayor–Council
  - Mayor: Mike Hammann

Area
  - Total: 0.34 sq mi (0.89 km^{2})
  - Land: 0.34 sq mi (0.89 km^{2})
  - Water: 0 sq mi (0.00 km^{2})
- Elevation: 1,496 ft (456 m)

Population (2020)
  - Total: 234
  - Density: 680/sq mi (260/km^{2})
- Time zone: UTC-6 (CST)
  - Summer (DST): UTC-5 (CDT)
- ZIP Code: 66840
- Area code: 620
- FIPS code: 20-09450
- GNIS ID: 2393471
- Website: burnsks.com

Burns is a city in Marion County, Kansas, United States. As of the 2020 census, the population of the city was 234. The city name came from a nearby train station, which was named prior to the city being incorporated. It is located between El Dorado and Florence along the west side of U.S. Route 77 highway. The southern edge of the city is the border between Marion and Butler counties.

== History ==
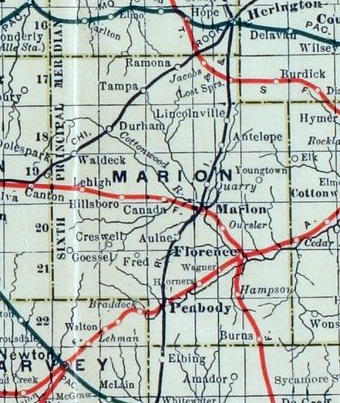
1915 railroad map of Marion County

=== Early history ===
For many millennia, the Great Plains of North America was inhabited by nomadic Native Americans. From the 16th century to 18th century, the Kingdom of France claimed ownership of large parts of North America. In 1762, after the French and Indian War, France secretly ceded New France to Spain, per the Treaty of Fontainebleau.

=== 19th century ===
In 1802, Spain returned most of the land to France. In 1803, most of the land for modern day Kansas was acquired by the United States from France as part of the 828,000 square mile Louisiana Purchase for 2.83 cents per acre.

In 1854, the Kansas Territory was organized, then in 1861 Kansas became the 34th U.S. state. In 1855, Marion County was established within the Kansas Territory, which included the land for modern day Burns.

In 1877, the Florence, El Dorado, and Walnut Valley Railroad Company built a branch line from Florence to El Dorado, and a station called Burns was built north of the present city location. In 1881, the rail line was extended to Douglass, then later to Arkansas City. The line was leased and operated by the Atchison, Topeka and Santa Fe Railway. The line from Florence through Burns to El Dorado was abandoned in 1942. The original branch line connected Florence through El Dorado to Arkansas City.

At the present location, a city named St. Francis was platted in August 1880. When the town incorporated, they discovered the official city name of St. Francis was already taken, so they changed the name to be the same as the nearby Burns train station, then soon afterward the station was moved into the new city. The original station was named after a railroad company official.

A post office was established in Burns on November 30, 1880.

=== 20th century ===
Burns High School was closed in 1965 as a result of statewide school district consolidation. Burns Elementary & Junior High School closed in 1997 due to the lack of funds. Education is currently provided by Peabody–Burns USD 398 public school district in Peabody.

=== 21st century ===
In 2010, the Keystone-Cushing Pipeline (Phase II) was constructed 6.5 miles west of Burns, north to south through Marion County, with much controversy over road damage, tax exemption, and environmental concerns (if a leak ever occurs). A pumping station named Burns was built two miles north of Potwin.

On August 15. 2023 police chief Joel Justice Womochil was arrested for possessing child pornography. He had been chief since February 8, 2022 but resigned on August 8. In March 2025, a federal judge sentenced him to 60 years in prison for two different conspiracies to produce pornography with children under six.

== Geography ==
Burns is located in the scenic Flint Hills and Great Plains of the state of Kansas. According to the United States Census Bureau, the city has a total area of 0.35 square miles (0.91 km^{2}), all land. The southern city boundary of Burns is the county line shared between Marion and Butler counties.

=== Climate ===
The climate in this area is characterized by hot, humid summers and generally mild to cool winters. According to the Köppen Climate Classification system, Burns has a humid subtropical climate, abbreviated "Cfa" on climate maps.

== Demographics ==
Historical population
Census	Pop.	Note	%±
1910	489		—
1920	622		27.2%
1930	455		−26.8%
1940	409		−10.1%
1950	294		−28.1%
1960	314		6.8%
1970	268		−14.6%
1980	224		−16.4%
1990	226		0.9%
2000	268		18.6%
2010	228		−14.9%
2020	234		2.6%
U.S. Decennial Census

=== 2020 census ===
The 2020 United States census counted 234 people, 83 households, and 56 families in Burns. The population density was 680.2 per square mile (262.6/km^{2}). There were 104 housing units at an average density of 302.3 per square mile (116.7/km^{2}). The racial makeup was 96.58% (226) white or European American (96.58% non-Hispanic white), 0.0% (0) black or African-American, 0.0% (0) Native American or Alaska Native, 0.0% (0) Asian, 0.0% (0) Pacific Islander or Native Hawaiian, 0.0% (0) from other races, and 3.42% (8) from two or more races. Hispanic or Latino of any race was 0.43% (1) of the population.

Of the 83 households, 32.5% had children under the age of 18; 49.4% were married couples living together; 22.9% had a female householder with no spouse or partner present. 25.3% of households consisted of individuals and 13.3% had someone living alone who was 65 years of age or older. The average household size was 3.3 and the average family size was 3.6. The percent of those with a bachelor's degree or higher was estimated to be 6.8% of the population.

29.9% of the population was under the age of 18, 9.8% from 18 to 24, 23.9% from 25 to 44, 22.6% from 45 to 64, and 13.7% who were 65 years of age or older. The median age was 33.3 years. For every 100 females, there were 87.2 males. For every 100 females ages 18 and older, there were 102.5 males.

The 2016–2020 5-year American Community Survey estimates show that the median household income was $59,167 (with a margin of error of +/- $14,882) and the median family income was $67,083 (+/- $8,721). Males had a median income of $41,250 (+/- $13,531) versus $20,625 (+/- $11,752) for females. The median income for those above 16 years old was $28,333 (+/- $5,497). Approximately, 11.8% of families and 19.4% of the population were below the poverty line, including 23.4% of those under the age of 18 and 13.8% of those ages 65 or over.

=== 2010 census ===
As of the census of 2010, there were 228 people, 93 households, and 59 families residing in the city. The population density was 651.4 inhabitants per square mile (251.5/km^{2}). There were 112 housing units at an average density of 320.0 per square mile (123.6/km^{2}). The racial makeup of the city was 96.9% White, 1.3% African American, 0.4% Native American, 0.4% Pacific Islander, and 0.9% from two or more races. Hispanic or Latino of any race were 0.9% of the population.

There were 93 households, of which 29.0% had children under the age of 18 living with them, 51.6% were married couples living together, 7.5% had a female householder with no husband present, 4.3% had a male householder with no wife present, and 36.6% were non-families. 32.3% of all households were made up of individuals, and 16.2% had someone living alone who was 65 years of age or older. The average household size was 2.45 and the average family size was 3.14.

The median age in the city was 38 years. 25% of residents were under the age of 18; 8.8% were between the ages of 18 and 24; 23.2% were from 25 to 44; 27.1% were from 45 to 64; and 15.8% were 65 years of age or older. The gender makeup of the city was 53.9% male and 46.1% female.

== Government ==
The Burns government consists of a mayor and five council members. The council meets once a month. As of January 2022, the mayor is Mike Hammann.

== Education ==
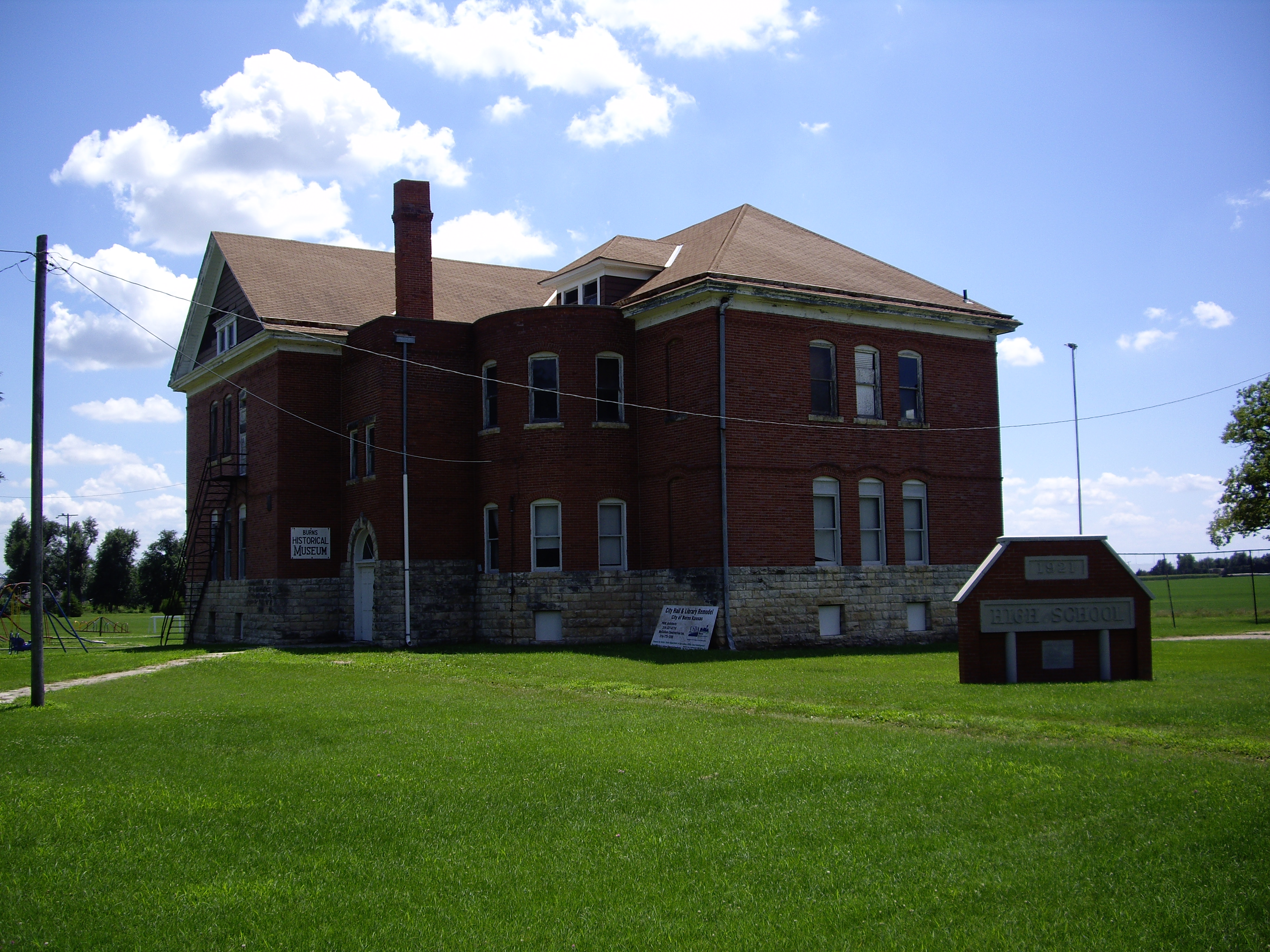
Burns Union School, now Burns Community Museum (2010)

=== Public ===
The community is served by Peabody–Burns USD 398 public school district. All students attend schools in Peabody at two schools:

- Peabody-Burns Junior/Senior High School, located in Peabody.
- Peabody-Burns Elementary School, located in Peabody.

Peabody-Burns High School Sports Championships

- 1977, 2nd Place, Class 2A, High School Boys Football, Head Coach Dennis Franchione.

Historical Burns Schools

- Burns High School, southeast corner of Main and Cincinnati. It was closed in 1965 as a result of statewide school district consolidation, then converted into the Burns Community Museum. The school mascot was Burns Hornets. It was the first consolidated grade school and high school in Kansas, and was the first to use a school "bus" in Kansas, which were special-order wagons in 1904. It is currently listed on the National Register of Historic Places (NRHP). (NRHP),
- Burns Elementary & Junior High School, southwest corner of Main and Church. It was closed in 1997 due to the lack of funds, then demolished.

Burns High School Sports Championships

- 1953, Class B, 1st Place, High School Boys Basketball, Head Coach Harvey Loy.

=== Private ===
- Eden Christian School, Private Mennonite Grade School, approximately 3 miles south of Burns.

=== Library ===
The city is served by the Burns Public Library at 104 North Washington Avenue. The library is a member of the North Central Kansas Libraries System.

== Media ==
=== Print ===
- Peabody Gazette-Bulletin, local newspaper for Burns, Florence, Peabody.
- Hillsboro Free Press, free newspaper for greater Marion County area.
- The El Dorado Times, regional newspaper from El Dorado.

=== Radio ===
Burns is served by numerous radio stations of the Wichita-Hutchinson listening market area, and satellite radio. See Media in Wichita, Kansas.

=== Television ===
Burns is served by over-the-air ATSC digital TV of the Wichita-Hutchinson viewing market area, cable TV by Allegiance Communications, and satellite TV. See Media in Wichita, Kansas.

=== Film ===
- Mars Attacks!, 1996 comedy science fiction movie, the Perkinsville scenes from this movie was filmed around Burns, such as the bus stop scene, cemetery scene, donut shop scenes, and trailer park scenes. The beginning cattle segment was filmed near Leon, and the retirement community was filmed in northeast Wichita. A city sign next to the highway was given to the city by Warner Brothers company.

== Infrastructure ==
=== Transportation ===
U.S. 77 highway runs north–south on the east side of Burns, and follows roughly parallel to the old railway.

== See also ==
- National Register of Historic Places listings in Marion County, Kansas
- Historical Maps of Marion County, Kansas
