= Fairplay Township =

Fairplay Township may refer to the following townships in the United States:

- Fairplay Township, Greene County, Indiana
- Fairplay Township, Marion County, Kansas
