= Doyle Township =

Doyle Township may refer to the following townships in the United States:

- Doyle Township, Clarke County, Iowa
- Doyle Township, Marion County, Kansas
- Doyle Township, Michigan
