= Aulne (disambiguation) =

Aulne is a river of Brittany in north-western France.

Aulne may also refer to:

- Aulne Abbey, a Cistercian monastery in Belgium
- Aulne, Kansas, an unincorporated community in the United States
