= Summit Township, Marion County, Kansas =

Summit Township Marion County, Kansas
- Township
- Location within Marion County

- Location within the state of Kansas
- Coordinates: 38.1296570°N 96.9870966°W
- Country: United States
- State: Kansas
- County: Marion

Area
  - Total: 36 sq mi (93 km^{2})

Dimensions
  - Length: 6.0 mi (9.7 km)
  - Width: 6.0 mi (9.7 km)
- Elevation: 1,463 ft (446 m)

Population (2020)
  - Total: 72
  - Density: 2.0/sq mi (0.77/km^{2})
- Time zone: UTC-6 (CST)
  - Summer (DST): UTC-5 (CDT)
- Area code: 620
- FIPS code: 20-69100
- GNIS ID: 477782
- Website: County website

Summit Township is a township in Marion County, Kansas, United States. As of the 2020 census, the township population was 72.

== Geography ==
Summit Township covers an area of 36 square miles (93.2 km^{2}).

== Communities ==
The township contains the following settlements:

- Ghost town of Watchorn. It was a former oil boom community during the 1910s and 1920s. It was located at the intersection of Timber Rd and 60th St (approximately 5 miles (8.0 km) east of Peabody).

== Cemeteries ==
The township contains the following cemeteries:

- Summit Township Cemetery (a.k.a. United Brethren Cemetery), located in Section 23 T22S R4E. The church was closed and demolished in the 2010s.
- Whitewater Center Cemetery (a.k.a. Stone Church Cemetery), located in Section 28 T22S R4E. The church is across the road.

== Gallery ==
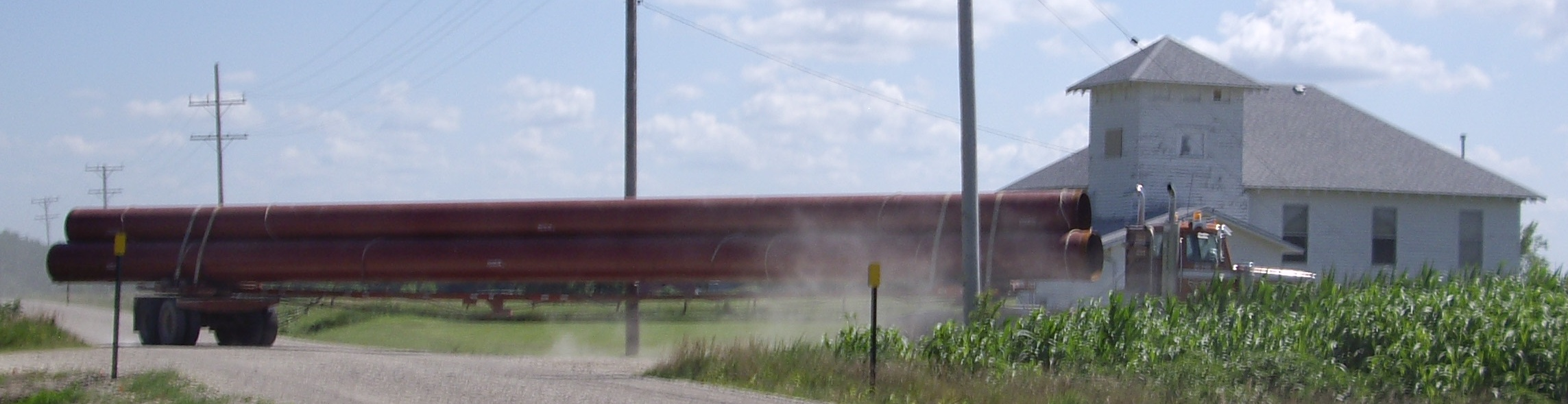
Truck hauling 36-Inch pipe to build Keystone-Cushing Pipeline (Phase II) south-east of Peabody at corner of Timber Rd and 20th St in Marion County. (Whitewater Center Church in background), in 2010.
