= Grant Township, Marion County, Kansas =

Grant Township Marion County, Kansas
- Township
- Location within Marion County

- Location within the state of Kansas
- Coordinates: 38.3666166°N 96.8781441°W
- Country: United States
- State: Kansas
- County: Marion

Area
  - Total: 69.5 sq mi (180 km^{2})

Dimensions
  - Length: 12.5 mi (20.1 km)
  - Width: 6.0 mi (9.7 km)
- Elevation: 1,424 ft (434 m)

Population (2020)
  - Total: 135
  - Density: 1.94/sq mi (0.750/km^{2})
- Time zone: UTC-6 (CST)
  - Summer (DST): UTC-5 (CDT)
- Area code: 620
- FIPS code: 20-27775
- GNIS ID: 477255
- Website: County website

Grant Township is a township in Marion County, Kansas, United States. As of the 2020 census, the township population was 135.

== Geography ==
Grant Township covers an area of 69.5 square miles (180.0 km^{2}).

== Communities ==
The township contains the following settlements:

- Ghost town of Elk (western part of community).

== Cemeteries ==
The township contains the following cemeteries:

- Grant Township Cemetery (aka Youngtown United Methodist Church Cemetery), located in Section 33 T19S R5E.
- Youngtown United Methodist Church Cemetery (aka Grant Township Cemetery), located in Section 20 T19S R5E.
- Unknown Cemetery (no longer in use), located in Section 13 T19S R5E.
