= Waldeck, Kansas =

Ghost town in Marion County, Kansas

- Ghost town
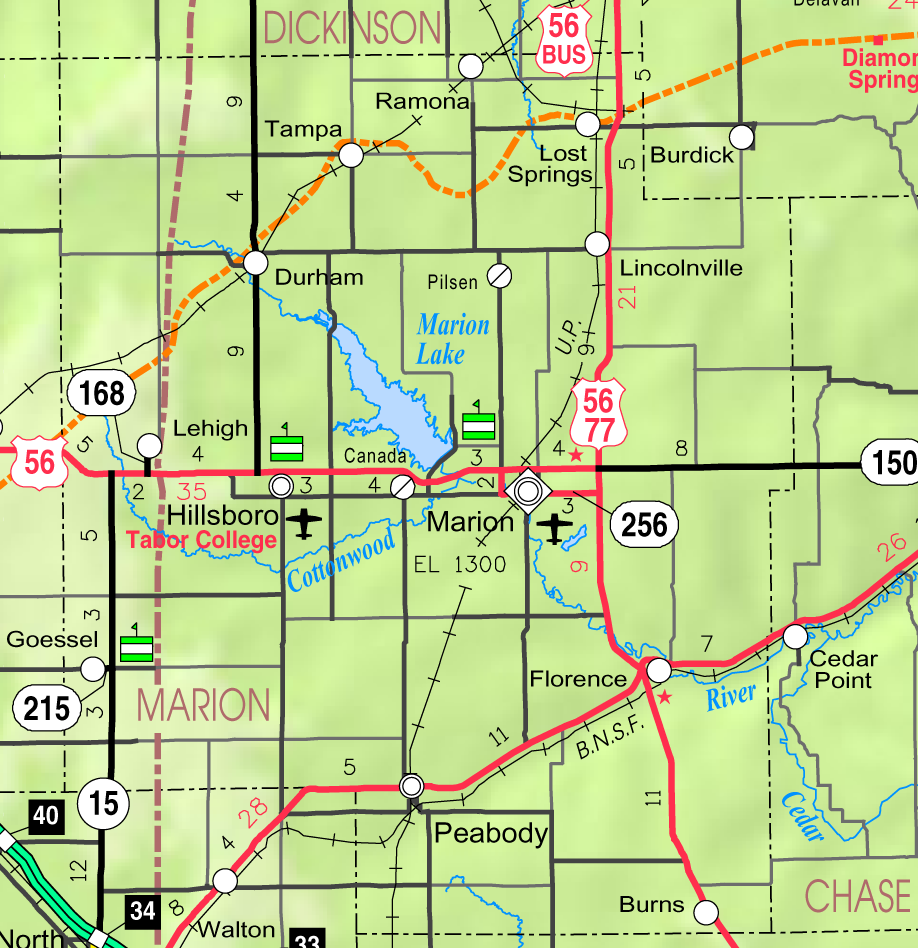
- KDOT map of Marion County (legend)

- Location within Kansas Location within the United States
- Coordinates: 38.4305642°N 97.3350299°W
- Country: United States
- State: Kansas
- County: Marion
- Township: Lehigh
- Founded: 1899
- Platted: 1899
- Named for: Waldeck
- Elevation: 1,555 ft (474 m)

Population
  - Total: 0
- Time zone: UTC-6 (CST)
  - Summer (DST): UTC-5 (CDT)
- Area code: 620
- FIPS code: 20-74540
- GNIS ID: 484810

Waldeck is a ghost town in Marion County, Kansas, United States. It is currently a ghost town that was located approximately 3.5 miles north of Lehigh next to a railroad. No buildings remain of this former community.

== History ==
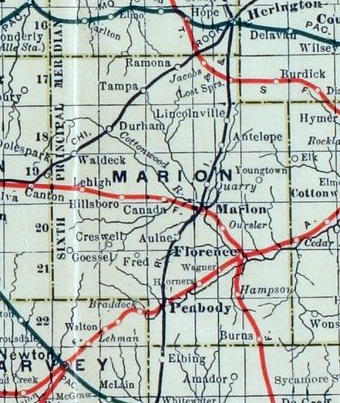
1915 railroad map of Marion County

=== Early history ===
For many millennia, the Great Plains of North America was inhabited by nomadic Native Americans. From the 16th century to 18th century, the Kingdom of France claimed ownership of large parts of North America. In 1762, after the French and Indian War, France secretly ceded New France to Spain, per the Treaty of Fontainebleau.

=== 19th century ===
In 1802, Spain returned most of the land to France. In 1803, most of the land for modern day Kansas was acquired by the United States from France as part of the 828,000 square mile Louisiana Purchase for 2.83 cents per acre.

In 1854, the Kansas Territory was organized, then in 1861 Kansas became the 34th U.S. state. In 1855, Marion County was established within the Kansas Territory, which included the land for modern day Waldeck.

From the 1820s to the 1870s, one of the most significant land routes in the United States was the Santa Fe Trail. The Santa Fe Trail was active across Marion County from 1821 to 1866. Along the Santa Fe Trail, French Frank's Road Ranch and Cottonwood Holes (for watering) were originally located on the land south of 245th Street. A Santa Fe Trail marker is located on the trail near Waldeck on 245th Street.

Also, the Chisholm Trail crossed Marion County from 1867 to 1871. Amazingly, Waldeck was near the junction of the Santa Fe Trail and Chisholm Trail, possibly within one mile.

In 1887, the Chicago, Kansas and Nebraska Railway built a main line from Herington through Waldeck to Pratt. In 1888, this line was extended to Liberal. Later, it was extended to Tucumcari, New Mexico and El Paso, Texas. It foreclosed in 1891 and taken over by Chicago, Rock Island and Pacific Railway, which shut down in 1980 and reorganized as Oklahoma, Kansas and Texas Railroad, merged in 1988 with Missouri Pacific Railroad, and finally merged in 1997 with Union Pacific Railroad. Waldeck was a coal and water stop for the railroad during the steam era. To allow for continuous train passage for those not needing to stop, a siding in excess of one mile was built. The siding continues this function for east and westbound commerce to pass to the present day.

The construction of this line meant that the Chisholm Trail no longer needed to run the additional 40 miles to Abilene, Kansas (the former northern terminus). Among the last usable structures at Waldeck, cattle corrals were operational until the early 1950s, when diesel locomotives became predominant.

The town was most likely named by a Swiss Brethren after the former Waldeck sovereign principality in the German Empire. The land on which Waldeck would stand was sold to the Golden Belt Town Co in October 1887. The railroad was routed through the land and a depot was built, but the "boom spirit" of the 1880s turned downward, so the land was sold at a loss to the Kansas Town and Loan Company in the 1890s. A townsite with two blocks was platted on December 7, 1899. A small general store and school were located in the community, but the town failed to grow.

=== 21st century ===
No structures currently exist in Waldeck; it is therefore considered a ghost town. There is a Santa Fe Trail marker nearby, on 245th Street.

== Geography ==
Waldeck was located at coordinates 38.4305642, -97.3350299 in the scenic Flint Hills and Great Plains of the state of Kansas. It was on the north side of 245th Street between Bison Road and Chisholm Trail Road in Marion County. It was bordered between 245th Street on the south side and the railroad on the north side. Its platted location was the northwestern quarter of Section 4, Township 19, Range 1. A stockyard was located on the north side of the tracks.
