= East Branch Township, Kansas =

East Branch Township Marion County, Kansas
- Township
- Location within Marion County

- Location within the state of Kansas
- Coordinates: 38.2177380°N 97.2075897°W
- Country: United States
- State: Kansas
- County: Marion

Area
  - Total: 36 sq mi (93 km^{2})

Dimensions
  - Length: 6.0 mi (9.7 km)
  - Width: 6.0 mi (9.7 km)
- Elevation: 1,532 ft (467 m)

Population (2020)
  - Total: 199
  - Density: 5.5/sq mi (2.1/km^{2})
- Time zone: UTC-6 (CST)
  - Summer (DST): UTC-5 (CDT)
- Area code: 620
- FIPS code: 20-19325
- GNIS ID: 477349
- Website: County website

East Branch Township is a township in Marion County, Kansas, United States. As of the 2020 census, the township population was 199.

== Geography ==
East Branch Township covers an area of 36 square miles (93.2 km^{2}).

== Communities ==
The township contains no cities or unincorporated communities.

== Cemeteries ==
The township contains the following cemeteries:

- Doyle Valley Cemetery (a.k.a. Doyle Creek Cemetery), located in Section 20 T21S R2E.
- Dunkard Cemetery (a.k.a. Church of the Brethren), located in Section 13 T21S R2E.
