= Milton Township, Marion County, Kansas =

Milton Township Marion County, Kansas
- Township
- Location within Marion County

- Location within the state of Kansas
- Coordinates: 38.1292350°N 96.8863068°W
- Country: United States
- State: Kansas
- County: Marion

Area
  - Total: 30 sq mi (78 km^{2})

Dimensions
  - Length: 6.0 mi (9.7 km)
  - Width: 5.0 mi (8.0 km)
- Elevation: 1,453 ft (443 m)

Population (2020)
  - Total: 323
  - Density: 11/sq mi (4.2/km^{2})
- Time zone: UTC-6 (CST)
  - Summer (DST): UTC-5 (CDT)
- Area code: 620
- FIPS code: 20-46900
- GNIS ID: 477790
- Website: County website

Milton Township is a township in Marion County, Kansas, United States. As of the 2020 census, the township population was 323, including the city of Burns.

== Geography ==
Milton Township covers an area of 36 square miles (93.2 km^{2}).

== Cities and towns ==
The township contains the following settlements:

- City of Burns.

== Cemeteries ==
The township contains the following cemeteries:

- Burns Catholic Church Cemetery, located in Section 33 T22S R5E.
- Burns City Cemetery, located in Section 33 T22S R5E.
- First Mennonite Church Cemetery, located in Section 29 T22S R5E.

== Transportation ==
U.S. Route 77 highway passes northwest to southeast through the township, and follows roughly parallel to the old railway.
