= Lehigh Township, Kansas =

Lehigh Township Marion County, Kansas
- Township
- Location within Marion County

- Location within the state of Kansas
- Coordinates: 38.3914905°N 97.3165415°W
- Country: United States
- State: Kansas
- County: Marion

Area
  - Total: 36 sq mi (93 km^{2})

Dimensions
  - Length: 6.0 mi (9.7 km)
  - Width: 6.0 mi (9.7 km)
- Elevation: 1,562 ft (476 m)

Population (2020)
  - Total: 311
  - Density: 8.6/sq mi (3.3/km^{2})
- Time zone: UTC-6 (CST)
  - Summer (DST): UTC-5 (CDT)
- Area code: 620
- FIPS code: 20-39250
- GNIS ID: 477225
- Website: County website

Lehigh Township is a township in Marion County, Kansas, United States. As of the 2020 census, the township population was 311, including the city of Lehigh.

== Geography ==
Lehigh Township covers an area of 36 square miles (93.2 km^{2}).

== Communities ==
The township contains the following settlements:

- City of Lehigh.
- Ghost town of Waldeck.

== Cemeteries ==
The township contains the following cemeteries:

- Lehigh Mennonite Cemetery, located in Section 27 T19S R1E.
- Lehigh Township Cemetery (aka Dalke Cemetery), located in Section 21 T19S R1E.
- Mennonite Brethren Church Cemetery, located in Section 27 T19S R1E.
- Silberfeld Community Cemetery (no longer in use), located in Section 1 T19S R1E.

== Transportation ==
K-15 and U.S. Route 56 highways pass through the township.
