= Oursler, Kansas =

Ghost town in Marion County, Kansas

- Ghost town
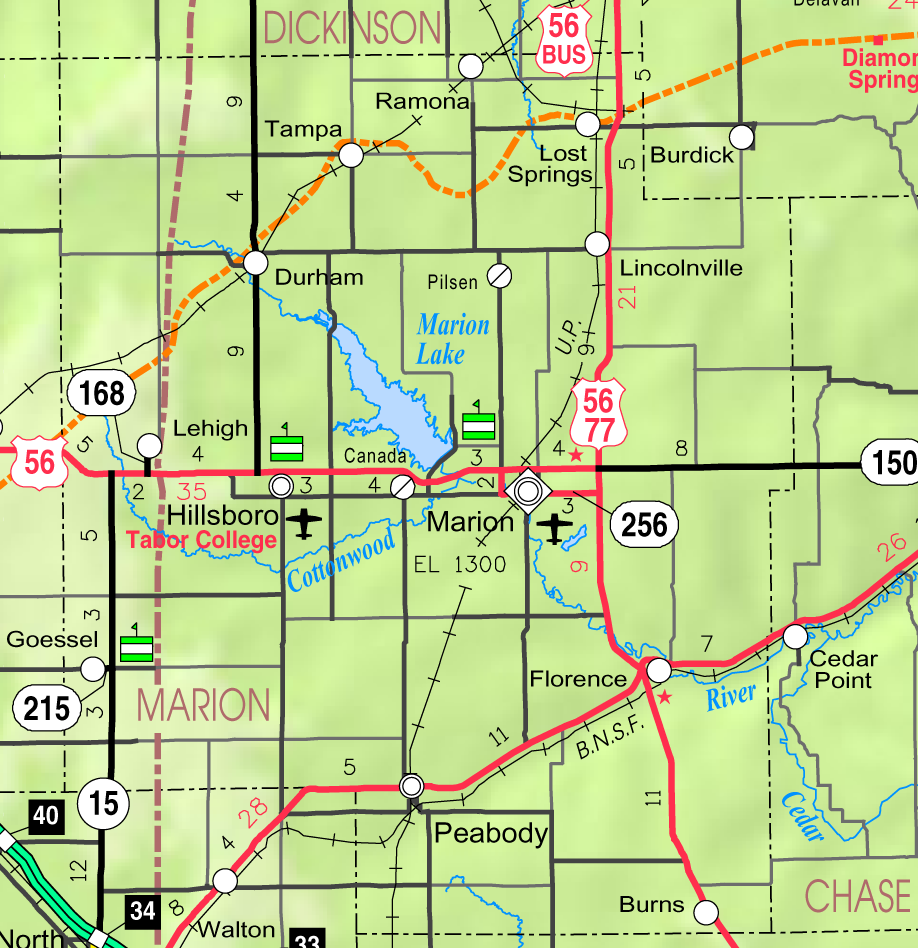
- KDOT map of Marion County (legend)

- Location within Kansas Location within the United States
- Coordinates: 38°17′23″N 96°58′52″W
- Country: United States
- State: Kansas
- County: Marion
- Township: Fairplay
- Founded: 1877
- Platted: 1877
- Named for: W.E.M. Oursler
- Elevation: 1,293 ft (394 m)

Population
  - Total: 0
- Time zone: UTC-6 (CST)
  - Summer (DST): UTC-5 (CDT)
- Area code: 620
- FIPS code: 20-53710
- GNIS ID: 484817

Oursler is a ghost town in Marion County, Kansas, United States. It is currently a ghost town that was located approximately 3.5 miles southeast of Marion next to a former railroad. No buildings remain of this former community.

== History ==
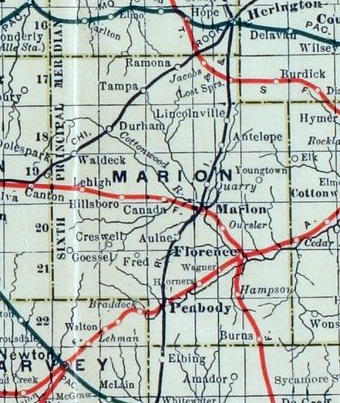
1915 railroad map of Marion County

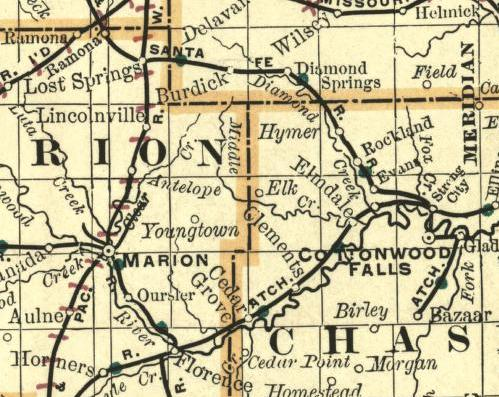
1893 railroad map

=== Early history ===
For many millennia, the Great Plains of North America was inhabited by nomadic Native Americans. From the 16th century to 18th century, the Kingdom of France claimed ownership of large parts of North America. In 1762, after the French and Indian War, France secretly ceded New France to Spain, per the Treaty of Fontainebleau.

=== 19th century ===
In 1802, Spain returned most of the land to France. In 1803, most of the land for modern day Kansas was acquired by the United States from France as part of the 828,000 square mile Louisiana Purchase for 2.83 cents per acre.

In 1854, the Kansas Territory was organized, then in 1861 Kansas became the 34th U.S. state. In 1855, Marion County was established within the Kansas Territory, which included the land for modern day Oursler.

As early as 1875, city leaders of Marion held a meeting to consider a branch railroad from Florence. In 1878, Atchison, Topeka and Santa Fe Railway and parties from Marion County and McPherson County chartered the Marion and McPherson Railway Company. In 1879, a branch line was built from Florence through Oursler to Marion then west to McPherson, in 1880 it was extended to Lyons, in 1881 it was extended to Ellinwood. The line was leased and operated by the Atchison, Topeka and Santa Fe Railway.

Oursler was named for W.E.M. Oursler, who came to Kansas in 1870 and kept a post office on his place for several years. After the railroad was built from Florence to Marion on the southwest side of Oursler, a depot was built and mail was brought to the station early each day. In addition to the post office, there was a brick kiln and a small grocery store. On October 17, 1877, W.E.M. Oursler and his wife filed a plot for a small town named Oursler with a size of two blocks.

=== 20th century ===
The railroad from Florence to Oursler to Marion, was abandoned in 1968.

=== 21st century ===
No buildings or landmarks exist in Oursler; it is therefore considered a ghost town.

== Geography ==
Oursler was located at coordinates 38°17′23″N, 96°58′52″W in the scenic Flint Hills and Great Plains of the state of Kansas. It was situated on a triangular plot, located at the southwestern corner of 150th Street and Union Road in Marion County. It was bordered by the two roads and the railroad southwest of the corner. Its platted location was the northeastern quarter of the northwestern quarter of Section 27, Township 20, Range 4.
