= Marion County Record =

Newspaper in Marion, Kansas

- Type: Weekly newspaper
- Format: Broadsheet
- Owner: Hoch Publishing
- Publisher: Eric K. Meyer
- Founded: 1869
- Language: English
- Headquarters: 117 S. 3rd St. Marion, Kansas 66861; United States
- Circulation: 1,941 (as of 2023)
- ISSN: 2159-4422
- OCLC number: 11368558
- Website: marionrecord.com

The Marion County Record is a weekly newspaper published in Marion, Kansas, United States, and the newspaper of record for the city and Marion County. It publishes Wednesdays. Its offices are across the street from the Marion County Courthouse. The paper was founded as The Western News in 1869 in nearby Detroit, Kansas. It soon moved to Marion, as it went through a series of owners and publishers and several names until 1874. It was then purchased by the Hoch family, which sold it in 1998 to the Meyer family, who had been involved since 1948 and continue to own it.

In August 2023, after one or more people complained to the local police department about reporting which the Record had not published, the police raided the office and homes of staff, seizing computers, reporting materials, and financial records. Joan Meyer, the 98-year-old co-owner, died the day after experiencing the tumultuous raid on her home. National news coverage of the raid precipitated criticism from local and national journalism organizations.

== Origin ==
A. W. Robinson founded the paper as The Western News, publishing its first issue on September 24, 1869, initially in Detroit, Kansas. Robinson relocated it to Marion Centre in 1870.

John E. Murphy purchased the paper and renamed it The Western Giant. He sold it five months later to C. S. Triplett, who in 1871 changed the name to Marion County Record. The nearby Emporia News praised Triplett's efforts after his first year running the paper. Triplett sold the paper in 1874 to Edward W. Hoch.

== Family ownership ==
Since 1874, two families have owned the Record. The Hoch family owned it for 124 years. The Meyer family, which had been involved with the paper since 1948, bought it in 1998, so that it could continue to be locally owned and operated rather than sold to a larger chain of newspapers.

E. W. Hoch ran the newspaper until 1925. Son Wallis Hoch and grandson Wharton Hoch also served as editors. E. W. Hoch and another of his sons, Homer Hoch, both held statewide political offices.

The Hochs acquired several other newspapers and merged them with the Record. Eighteen newspapers were published in Marion, each for fewer than two years, between 1880 and 1895. The Marion Times, founded in 1890 by C. E. Foote and Henry Kuhn, became the Marion Headlight in 1899 when J. J. Buschlen purchased it. Buschlen sold the paper to the Record in 1909.

The Marion Review, founded by D. O. Bell as the Lincolnville Lance in 1907, became the Marion County Lance, moved to Marion in 1908, and changed its name to the Marion Review. C. C. Jones was the Review’s first publisher. Mr. and Mrs. T. B. Matlock, Mr. and Mrs. Burton Smith and Mr. and Mrs. John Riddle followed him as publishers until, in May 1944, the Record and the Review merged to become the Marion Record-Review.

Wharton Hoch purchased the Riddle interest in May 1948. Bill Meyer joined as associate editor three months later. The paper's name reverted to Marion County Record in October 1957. Meyer became editor after Hoch's death in 1967. He and his wife, Joan W. Meyer, and son, Eric K. Meyer, a journalism professor at the University of Illinois, purchased the newspaper from Wharton Hoch's estate in 1998. The Meyer family bought the paper to prevent it from being sold to Liberty Group Publishing. The Hoch family has remained active in Kansas journalism until as recently as 2016.

Bill Meyer died in 2006. Joan Meyer, who compiled the Record’s "Memories" column until her death in 2023, was the newspaper's most senior staff member, having worked there for more than 50 years. Eric Meyer serves as publisher and president of the parent corporation, Hoch Publishing Co., Inc.

Donna Bernhardt, who remains a member of the board of directors along with longtime employees Melvin Honeyfield and Jean Stuchlik, became editor after Bill Meyer's retirement in 2003. Susan Berg, who later became Marion County treasurer, succeeded her as managing editor in 2008. After a series of news editors, including Adam Stewart, David Colburn, Sheila Kelley, and Mindy Kepfield, Eric Meyer assumed the role of editor after his retirement from the University of Illinois in 2021. Other current staff include reporters Clara Germani, Nicholas Kimball, Rowena Plett, Owen Prothro and Judd Weil, sales manager Debra Steele, office manager Arlene Ehrlich, and distribution workers Bev Baldwin and Barb Creamer. The paper's staff is larger than typical for a community of its size, since in 2026 it had five full-time and seven part-time staff, compared to a more typical size of three staff members.

== "Official" billing ==
Bill Meyer described his newspapers as "official", in reference to their status as officially recognized venues for legal advertisements in their cities. While run by the Hoch family in the 19th century, the Record described itself in its masthead as "Official Paper, Of City and County" and was identified by name in a number of city ordinances.

== Significant stories ==
The Record follows a model of journalism that focuses on accountability.

In 2004, the Marion County Record reported that the city was using water from a contaminated water reservoir.

In 2022, the paper investigated a housing development project with possible zoning irregularities.

== Present status ==
The Record is the oldest publication in Marion County; the Peabody Gazette-Bulletin, which the Record purchased in 2001, is three years younger. The Record purchased the Hillsboro Star-Journal in 1999. The Record is printed on presses owned by CherryRoad Media in Hutchinson, Kansas.

Following the 2023 police raid, the paper doubled its paid circulation to 5,500. However, owner Eric W. Meyer said he was down three staff positions and had struggled to fill them. Meyer doesn't take a salary. He wants to some day hand over the paper to "some young people that might be able to come here and might get enchanted with it."

== 2023 police raid ==
=== Background ===
A dispute between local restaurant owner Kari Newell and her husband Ryan, who were undergoing divorce proceedings, was the impetus for the raid. Ryan Newell told The Washington Post that he was concerned that his wife had continued driving and received a liquor license despite losing her driver's license in 2008 for drunk driving. Ryan Newell stated that an unnamed source gave him a screenshot of his wife's driving record and that he had passed the screenshot to a friend, who sent the screenshot to councilwoman Ruth Herbel and a Marion County Record reporter.

Sworn affidavits allege that a Marion County Record reporter obtained the driving record of Kari Newell. Newell alleged someone had accessed her private files by using a piece of postal mail addressed to her by the Kansas Department of Revenue. She claimed this was a violation of the Driver's Privacy Protection Act, which makes it illegal to use "false representation to obtain or use any personal information derived from an individual's motor vehicle record drivers' personal information".

The Record did not initially report on the evidence against Newell, believing the materials to have been leaked in relation to divorce proceedings. Eric Meyer notified the police of the leak. At a city council meeting on August 7, 2023, Kari Newell accused the Record of having her "private personal information". She confirmed that she had continued driving after losing her license due to a drunk driving charge, but alleged that the newspaper had illegally obtained and disseminated the information. The Record then published an article about the allegations Newell made against the newspaper at a Marion city council meeting. In that article, the Record reported that a confidential source alleged that local law enforcement was aware that Newell didn't have a valid driver's license and that the city police had ignored "repeated violations of driving laws by Newell". In a post-raid statement, Newell said she has a driver's license and that the prior conviction was too old to influence the liquor permitting process.

Marion Police Department chief Gideon Cody wrote that the records would otherwise not have been accessed if the employee had not impersonated Newell's husband Ryan or lied. Magistrate judge Laura Viar authorized a search on August 11 in connection with a criminal investigation into identity theft using Newell's information.

=== The raid ===
On August 11, 2023, the Marion Police Department raided the Record's office and home of one owner, showing a search warrant to publisher Eric Meyer afterward. Officers seized computers, cellphones and reporting materials. The raid came after the paper had received evidence from a confidential source that Kari Newell, a local restaurant owner, had been convicted of drunken driving and continued to drive her vehicle without a valid operator's license, which could have prevented Newell from obtaining a liquor license for her business. The search warrant, signed by Marion County District Court Magistrate Judge Laura Viar (who has a history of DUI arrests and driving on a suspended license), alleged identity theft and unlawful use of a computer and authorized police to seize equipment that could have been used to steal Newell's identity. After Meyer filed to obtain a copy of the affidavit supporting the issuance of a probable cause warrant, the judge responded that she did not have a probable cause warrant.

Bodycam video showed that recently hired Police Chief Gideon Cody was alerted to the presence of printed information about himself during the raid. Cody also spoke with Newell, while the police were conducting the raid on the paper. Two veteran female reporters suffered health problems after the raid. One of them, Deb Gruver, earlier had discovered that Cody had been anticipating being demoted at the Kansas City, Missouri, Police Department due to allegations against him of workplace harassment and opted instead for retirement there. Gruver resigned from her position at the Record, saying the raid caused her to suffer the exacerbation of a stress-related condition. She filed a federal lawsuit against Cody. The other reporter, Phyllis Zorn, also stated her intention to sue, citing permanent aggravation of a seizure disorder as a result of the raid.

According to the Kansas Reflector, the raid "appears to violate federal law that provides protections against searching and seizing materials from journalists. Cody wrote in a Facebook post that the law allows a search warrant "when there is reason to believe the journalist is taking part in the underlying wrongdoing". One day after the fractious raid on her home, the 98-year-old co-owner of the Record, Joan Meyer, died. The Record said that she had been unable to eat or sleep due to stress following the raid, and then died. In bodycam footage later obtained by the Record after Eric had left their house during the raid, Joan can be heard telling the police, "You know, if I have a heart attack and die, it's all your fault... If I die, you're going to be sued for murder." Her son Eric, publisher and co-owner of the newspaper, stated that a coroner determined that the raid contributed to his mother's death.

The officers also searched the home of Vice Mayor Ruth Herbel.

=== Reactions ===
The incident attracted international attention. Representatives of 34 news organizations signed a four-page letter condemning Marion police. The Society of Professional Journalists board of directors offered up to $20,000 from its legal defense fund to help defray the paper's legal costs. The Writers Guild of America, East and the NewsGuild-CWA called for the officers who raided the Marion County Record to be held accountable.

The Kansas Bureau of Investigation (KBI) announced on August 16 that all of the seized items would be returned, and that it would proceed with an investigation into the raid without reviewing any of the seized evidence. By the end of the day, Marion County Attorney Joel Ensey withdrew the warrant, and an attorney representing the Record confirmed that all items had been returned and would be examined for alterations.

On November 8, the Kansas Commission on Judicial Conduct considered in camera a complaint against magistrate Laura Viar for approving the search warrant for the raid. In a December 6 letter, they stated they dismissed the complaint because "facts and circumstances were not sufficient to conclude the issuance of the warrant crossed the line of incompetence," however, "This is not to say that the commission agrees that the issuance of the search warrant in this instance was reasonable or legally appropriate."

In early December, Colorado Bureau of Investigation agents, deputized to act on behalf of the KBI, interviewed several people about the raid. Record publisher Meyer reported that the Colorado agents were brought in as neutral third parties to gather evidence for two Kansas special prosecutors: Barry Wilkerson, county attorney of Riley County, who would investigate the raid itself, and possibly District Attorney Stephen Howe of Johnson County, who would investigate the access of the driving record.

=== Investigation of Marion police chief Gideon Cody ===
In post-raid interviews, owner and publisher Eric Meyer stated that the Record was also in the process of investigating Cody, who was named police chief of Marion two months earlier. The paper had received numerous tips that Cody had left his Kansas City police job under a cloud of misconduct allegations, but the paper had yet to publish an article about the investigation because the sources had not agreed to go on the record. The seized computers contained those allegations and the tipsters' identities. Meyer also said a Record reporter approached Cody seeking comment on the allegations. In response, Meyer said Cody threatened to sue the paper.

Previously, Cody had expelled reporters from the paper from a meeting with Jake LaTurner, Republican Congressman from Kansas's 2nd congressional district, reportedly at the behest of Newell, whose restaurant was the location of the meeting. LaTurner's staff, which invited the reporters, apologized.

Gideon Cody, a captain in the Kansas City, Missouri Police Department's (KCMO) property crimes unit, was under internal review for allegedly making insulting and sexist comments to a female officer. At the end of the internal investigation into the hostile work complaint, Cody was told that he would be demoted to sergeant, so he resigned with captain rank, which had an annual salary of $115,848. In May 2023, Cody was sworn in as Marion’s new police chief, a job that pays $60,000 a year.

Record reporter Deb Gruver published anonymous allegations from a former internal affairs detective for KCMO police that Cody had a reputation for bad judgment. In one instance he sped through the active scene of a possible suicide jumper and ran over the body, compromising the entire crime scene. As a result, he was transferred and suspended, yet he liked to joke about running over the body.

On September 28, 2023, Marion Mayor David Mayfield suspended Police Chief Cody with no reason given, a reversal of an earlier decision to allow him to continue working while the Kansas Bureau of Investigation probed his raid. Under city code, the mayor has the right to suspend, but only the council has the right to fire a city officer. On October 2, Chief Cody resigned effective immediately; the city council appointed Officer Zach Hudlin acting chief of police.

=== Lawsuits ===
On August 30, 2023, Record reporter Deb Gruver sued Chief Gideon Cody for compensatory and punitive damages for “emotional distress, mental anguish, and physical injury” in violating her First and Fourth Amendment rights. The lawsuit states Cody seized her personal cell phone while his application for the search warrant did not mention her or her phone as evidence of a crime. Gruver said her finger had been injured when police grabbed her cell phone out of her hand. She accepted $235,000 to settle part of her federal lawsuit. Gruver agreed to remove Cody from the lawsuit while leaving the Marion County sheriff and the county’s prosecutor. She plans to create a journalism scholarship with part of the money.

Reporter Phyllis Zorn filled a federal lawsuit on February 6, 2024, against a number of local officials seeking $950,000 in damages. The lawsuit alleges Cody was angry at the newspaper for investigating his background before he was hired as Marion’s police chief. It also claimed Zorn was on Cody’s “enemies list” for declining his offer to create a rival newspaper together. She later settled for $850,000.

Office manager Cheri Bentz was the third Record employee to file a lawsuit over the raid. In her federal lawsuit filed on March 29, 2024, Bentz claims she was unlawfully detained and interrogated, and had her cellphone seized. She later settled for an undisclosed amount.

On April 1, 2024, owner and publisher Eric Meyer filed a federal lawsuit against the City of Marion, the then-mayor David Mayfield, then-Police Chief Gideon Cody, acting Chief Zach Hudlin, the Marion County Board of Commissioners, Sheriff Jeff Soyez, and detective Aaron Christner. He is seeking more than $5 million for the wrongful death of his mother and on behalf of the Record, and $4 million in punitive damages.

On May 29, 2024, former vice mayor and councilwoman Ruth Herbel filed a federal lawsuit against Marion, Kansas officials.

In November 2025, Marion County settled legal claims against the county (but not the city and city officials) by agreeing to pay over $3 million along with an apology from the county sheriff. Under the judgment, the estate of Meyer’s mother will receive $1 million. Meyer, Gruver, Zorn and Bentz will split $1.1 million, and Herbel will receive $650,000.

=== Prosecution and discipline ===
On July 31, 2024, the Kansas Commission on Judicial Conduct dismissed a complaint against Magistrate Judge Laura Viar that she had improperly authorized the raid.

On August 5, 2024, special prosecutors Marc Bennett and Barry Wilkerson found no evidence supporting the underlying criminal offenses Gideon Cody accused former Marion Vice Mayor Ruth Herbel and reporter Phyllis Zorn of committing in his warrant applications. Cody will be charged with obstruction of judicial process, a felony, for directing restaurant owner Kari Newell to delete a text message conversation about the raid and for removal of two pages from her witness statement that included evidence showing Cody had reached out to her to tell her she was the victim of a crime. In October 2025, a judge determined there was enough evidence to go to trial, which has been delayed until the middle of 2026.

== Hall of Famers ==
Five of the newspaper's current or former managers are members of the Kansas Newspaper Hall of Fame:

- 1932: Edward Hoch, 17th Governor of Kansas and namesake of Hoch Auditoria at the University of Kansas, was inducted in 1932.
- 1974: Wharton Hoch, his grandson, was inducted in 1974.
- 2003: Bill Meyer, the second living inductee, was inducted in 2003, a year after he won the Eugene Cervi Award for Lifetime Achievement from the International Society of Weekly Newspaper Editors.
- 2024: Bill's wife, Joan Meyer, was inducted in 2024, a year after her death in the wake of the police raid, as was her son, Eric Meyer.

== Other awards ==
In the wake of the police raid, Eric and Joan Meyer and the newspaper were honored with several awards. Among them were the Don Bolles Medal from Investigative Reporters and Editors; a Citation of Courage from the Radio Television Digital News Association; the William Allen White National Citation from the University of Kansas; the Maria Ressa Prize for Courage in Local or Independent Journalism from the University of Maryland; the Victor Murdock Award from the Kansas Press Association; the Chairman's Award from the National Newspaper Association; the Tom and Pat Gish Award from the Institute for Rural Journalism at the University of Kentucky; and the Local Journalism Bright Spot and Media and Democracy Hero by the Media and Democracy Project.

In 2025, Eric Meyer joined his father in receiving the Eugene Cervi Award from the International Society of Weekly Newspaper Editors. He was the first son of a previous recipient to receive the award and the third journalist from Kansas to receive it, after his father in 2002 and McDill "Huck" Boyd in 1985. Unlike many awards won after police raided the newspaper in August 2023, the award is presented, according to ISWNE, “not for a single brave accomplishment but for a career of outstanding public service through community journalism and for adhering to the highest standards of the profession with deep reverence for the English language and consistently aggressive reporting at the grassroots level.”

The newspaper also frequently is honored in Kansas Press Association contests. In 2025, it won a near-record 39 awards, including best overall news and writing. The paper placed first in the state in overall news and writing for four of the past five years. The one year it didn’t win, staffers ran out of time to submit an entry in that category.

For the second year in a row, the paper swept 1st and 2nd place statewide in investigative reporting. Since 2000, the it has received three 1st, five 2nd, and three 3rd place awards in that category. In 2025 it also repeated as 1st place winner for best news story and for best series of stories and placed 1st for best front page, for which it received two 1st place awards, a 2nd, and a 3rd in the five previous years.

The Record won 1st place for best editorial writing — its sixth award in that category (two 1st, one 2nd, and three 3rd) in six years — and 1st place for best column writing (its fourth award in six years). Its editorial page was rated best in the state. It also won 1st for best health story, for best religion story, for best story originating from a public notice, and for overall design and layout excellence (its fifth consecutive award when entering that category).

== See also ==
The other newspapers in Marion County are Hillsboro Free Press, Hillsboro Star-Journal, Peabody Gazette-Bulletin. The Star-Journal and the Gazette-Bulletin are owned by Hoch Publishing along with the Record.
