= Hillsboro Star-Journal =

- Type: Weekly newspaper
- Format: Broadsheet
- Owner(s): Hoch Publishing
- Publisher: Eric Meyer
- News editor: Mindy Kepfield
- Headquarters: 117 S 3rd St; Marion, Kansas 66861; United States
- Circulation: 1,351
- Website: starj.com

The Hillsboro Star-Journal is a local weekly newspaper for the cities of Hillsboro, Kansas, Lehigh, Durham in the state of Kansas. The paper publishes weekly every Wednesday. It is one of two newspapers in the city, the other being the Hillsboro Free Press.

== See also ==
The other newspapers in Marion County are Hillsboro Free Press, Marion County Record, Peabody Gazette-Bulletin.
