= Marion County, Kansas =

County in Kansas, United States

- County
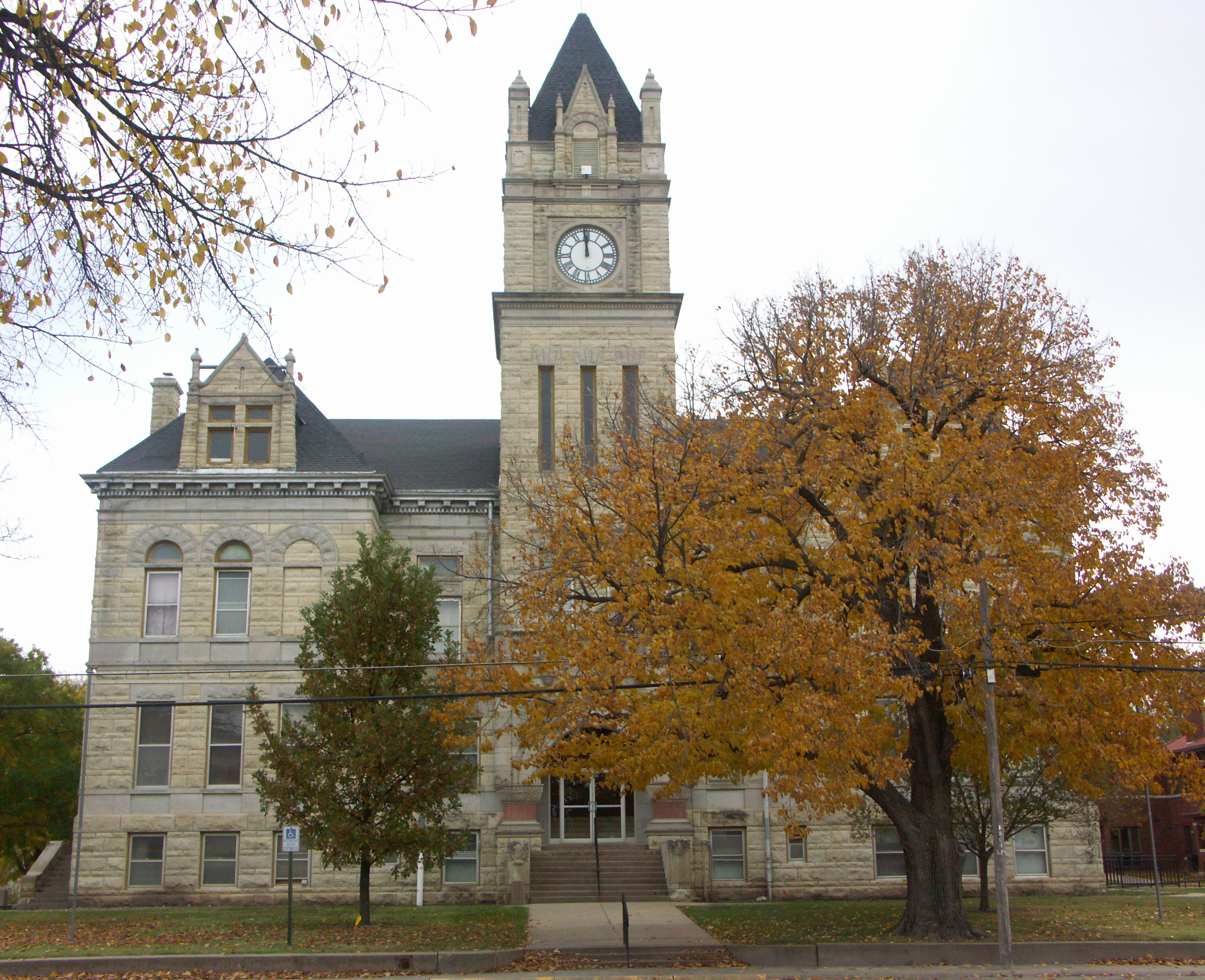
- Marion County Courthouse in Marion (2009)

- Location within the U.S. state of Kansas
- Coordinates: 38°21′N 97°06′W
- Country: United States
- State: Kansas
- Founded: August 30, 1855
- Named for: Francis Marion
- Seat: Marion
- Largest city: Hillsboro

Area
  - Total: 954 sq mi (2,470 km^{2})
  - Land: 944 sq mi (2,440 km^{2})
  - Water: 9.4 sq mi (24 km^{2}) 1.0%

Population (2020)
  - Total: 11,823
  - Estimate (2025): 11,634 ▼
  - Density: 12.5/sq mi (4.84/km^{2})
- Time zone: UTC−6 (Central)
  - Summer (DST): UTC−5 (CDT)
- Area code: 620, 785
- Congressional district: 2nd
- Website: marioncoks.net

Marion County is a county located in the U.S. state of Kansas. Its county seat is Marion and its most populous city is Hillsboro. As of the 2020 census, the county population was 11,823. The county was named in honor of Francis Marion, a brigadier general of the American Revolutionary War, known as the "Swamp Fox".

== History ==
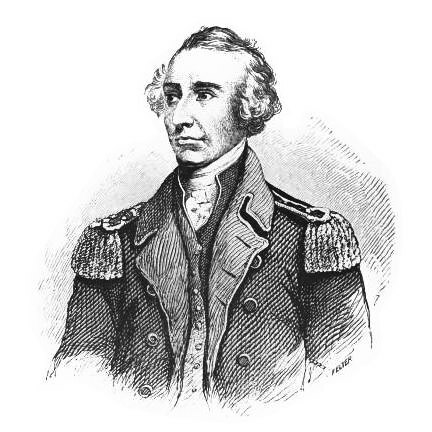
Francis Marion (late 1700s)

=== Early history ===
For millennia, the Great Plains of North America were inhabited by Native Americans. From the 16th to 18th centuries, the Kingdom of France claimed ownership of large parts of North America. In 1762, after the French and Indian War, France secretly ceded New France to Spain, by the Treaty of Fontainebleau.

=== 19th century ===
In 1802, Spain returned most of the land to France, but keeping title to about 7,500 square miles. In 1803, most of the land for modern day Kansas was acquired by the United States from France as part of the 828,000 square mile Louisiana Purchase for 2.83 cents per acre. In 1848, after the Mexican–American War, the Treaty of Guadalupe Hidalgo with Spain brought into the United States all or part of land for ten future states, including southwest Kansas.

In 1806, Zebulon Pike led the Pike Expedition westward from St Louis, Missouri, of which part of their journey followed the Cottonwood River through modern Marion County near the current cities of Florence, Marion, Durham.

In 1854, the Kansas Territory was organized, then in 1861 Kansas became the 34th U.S. state. In 1855, Marion County was established. The first settlers in Marion County located on Doyle Creek, near the present site of Florence. They were Moses Shane, who came in 1858, and whose death the next year was the first in the county; Patrick Doyle, in 1859, for whom Doyle Creek and Township were named, and a family by the name of Welsh, in which occurred the first birth in the county in August 1859. The city of Marion Centre was founded in 1860, became the county seat in 1865, and later the city name was shortened to Marion.

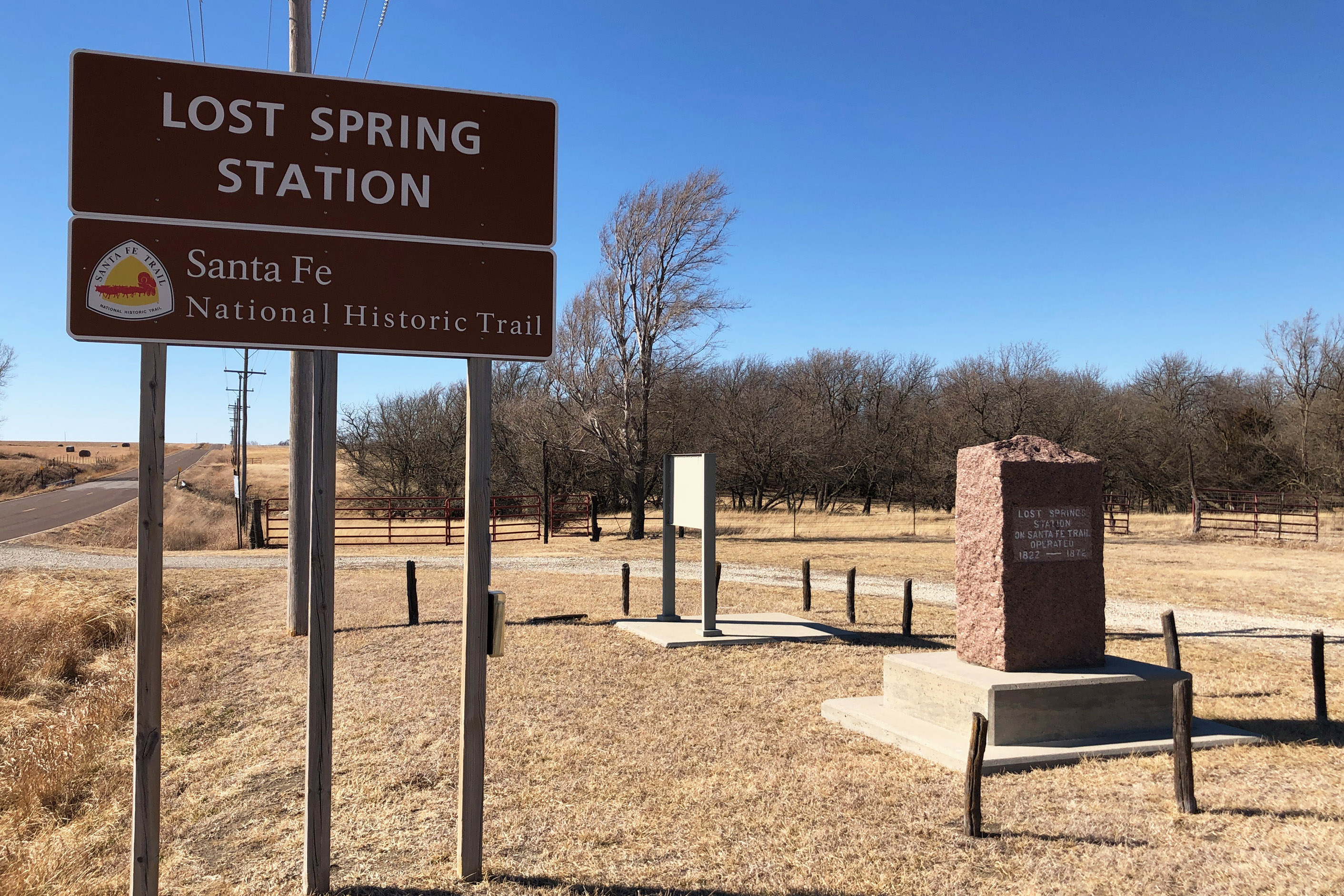
Lost Spring Station marker along former Santa Fe Trail

From 1821 to 1866, the Santa Fe Trail was active across Marion County. In the spring of 1859, a trading post was established at the "Lost Spring" on the Santa Fe Trail, and in the autumn of the same year, the Moore brothers established a ranch near the present site of Durham, and the first post office was established at this place. Later in the same year, a post office was established at "Lost Spring" near the current city of Lost Springs. Previously the nearest post office was Emporia.

From 1867 to 1871, the Chisholm Trail was routed along the western edge of Marion County. The trail started in Texas and ended in Abilene, Kansas, where cattle were shipped eastward by rail. As the railroads were built westward and southward, the trail was truncated from going further north.

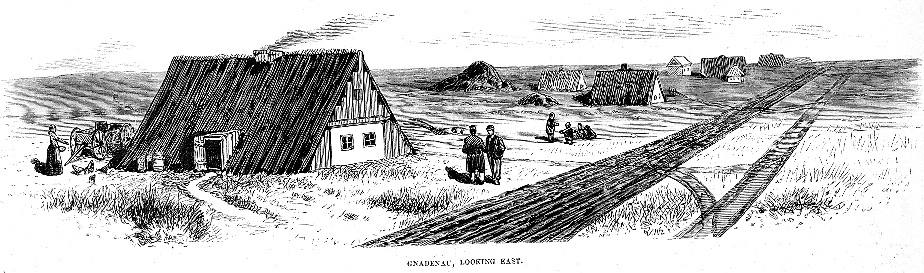
Burdei-type housing in Gnadenau (Frank Leslie's Illustrated March 20, 1875) (located southeast of Hillsboro)

Originally, Marion County covered more than a third of the area of Kansas, including all the territory in the state south and west of the present northern and eastern lines of the county. The original location of the county was fixed by legislative act in 1860. It comprised less than the present area. The original boundaries were altered by an increase of territory on the west and a decrease on the south. In 1863, the legislature by special act fixed the boundaries to include all of southwestern Kansas. In June of that year, on petition of the citizens of the county, the governor restored the previous boundaries and ordered a separate organization of the county. The south-eastern border one mile "notch" with Chase County was established under unusual circumstances. A murder had occurred and Marion County didn't want to have the trial, so a section one mile wide and eighteen miles long was ceded to Chase County to ensure the murder had occurred there. The one mile strip of land remains in Chase County to this day. The present county boundary lines were decided upon in 1872 and contain twenty-four townships.

The first two-story courthouse of stone was built in 1867. The upper floor was used for county court and the first floor was used as a school. A high wall for a place of refuge and defense in the event of an Indian attack surrounded it, but it was never needed for that purpose. An addition was completed in 1879 and part of the original structure was remodeled in 1881. The present three-story native limestone structure was completed in 1907.

==== Santa Fe Railroad ====
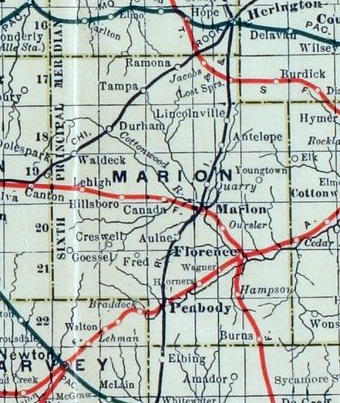
1915-1918 railroad map of Marion County

The state of Kansas granted the Atchison and Topeka Railroad three million acres (12,000 km^{2}) of land if it would build a continuous line to the western border of the state within ten years (March 1, 1873). In 1871, the railroad pushed westward from Emporia through Florence, Horners, and Peabody towards Newton, and got title to the land in 1873. According to the original land grant, the railroad was to receive every odd numbered section for ten miles (16 km) on each side of its track, but in eastern Kansas which was largely settled by then, much of this land was not available. The law therefore gave the railroad what was called "in lieu" lands further west. Eventually this worked out to be half the land on a strip twenty miles (32 km) on each side of its track from Emporia nearly out to Kinsley, which meant that most of Marion County fell within this strip.

In 1877, the Florence, El Dorado, and Walnut Valley Railroad Company built a branch line from Florence to El Dorado, in 1881 it was extended to Douglass, and later to Arkansas City. The line was leased and operated by the Atchison, Topeka and Santa Fe Railway. The line from Florence to El Dorado was abandoned in 1942. The original branch line connected Florence, Burns, De Graff, El Dorado, Augusta, Douglass, Rock, Akron, Winfield and Arkansas City.

In 1887, Atchison, Topeka and Santa Fe Railway built a branch line from Neva (three miles west of Strong City) to Superior, Nebraska. This branch line connected Strong City, Neva, Rockland, Diamond Springs, Burdick, Lost Springs, Jacobs, Hope, Navarre, Enterprise, Abilene, Talmage, Manchester, Longford, Oak Hill, Miltonvale, Aurora, Huscher, Concordia, Kackley, Courtland, Webber and Superior. At some point, the line from Neva to Lost Springs was pulled, but the right of way has not been abandoned. This branch line was originally called "Strong City and Superior line", but later the name was shortened to the "Strong City line". The railway is connected via a switch to allow north-bound "Rock Island" traffic to connect onto the north-west-bound "Santa Fe" tracks. This is the only way for the Santa Fe traffic to travel north-west after removing the tracks to Neva.

As early as 1875, city leaders of Marion held a meeting to consider a branch railroad from Florence. In 1878, Atchison, Topeka and Santa Fe Railway and parties from Marion County and McPherson County chartered the Marion and McPherson Railway Company. In 1879, a branch line was built from Florence to McPherson; in 1880 it was extended to Lyons, in 1881 it was extended to Ellinwood. The line was leased and operated by the Atchison, Topeka and Santa Fe Railway. The line from Florence to Marion was abandoned in 1968. In 1992, the line from Marion to McPherson was sold to Central Kansas Railway. In 1993, after heavy flood damage, the line from Marion to McPherson was abandoned. The original branch line connected Florence, Oursler, Marion, Canada, Hillsboro, Lehigh, Canton, Galva, McPherson, Conway, Windom, Little River, Mitchell, Lyons, Chase and Ellinwood.

In 1996, the Atchison, Topeka and Santa Fe Railway merged with Burlington Northern Railroad and renamed to the current BNSF Railway. Most locals still refer to this railroad as the "Santa Fe".

==== Rock Island Railroad ====
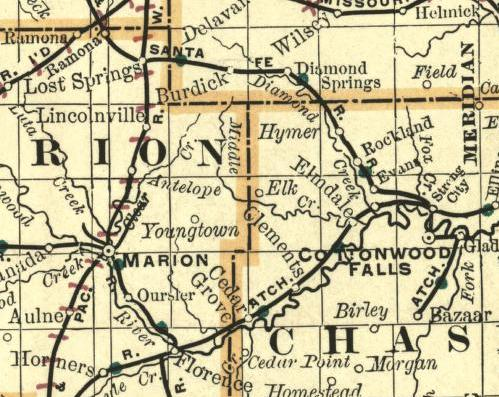
1893 Railroad Map

In 1887, the Chicago, Kansas and Nebraska Railway extended its main line from Herington to Pratt. This main line connected Herington, Ramona, Tampa, Durham, Waldeck, Canton, Galva, McPherson, Groveland, Inman, Medora, Hutchinson, Whiteside, Partridge, Arlington, Langdon, Turon, Preston, Natrona and Pratt. In 1888, this main line was extended to Liberal. Later, this line was extended to Tucumcari, New Mexico, and El Paso, Texas. This line is called the "Golden State Limited".

In 1887, the Chicago, Kansas and Nebraska Railway built a branch line north–south from Herington to Caldwell. This branch line connected Herington, Lost Springs, Lincolnville, Antelope, Marion, Aulne, Peabody, Elbing, Whitewater, Furley, Kechi, Wichita, Peck, Corbin, Wellington and Caldwell. By 1893, this branch line was incrementally built to Fort Worth, Texas. This line is called the "OKT".

The "Rock Island" has switches in Peabody and Lost Springs to allow connections to the crossing "Santa Fe" railroad in each city.

The Chicago, Kansas and Nebraska Railway was foreclosed in 1891 and was taken over by Chicago, Rock Island and Pacific Railway, which shut down in 1980 and reorganized as Oklahoma, Kansas and Texas Railroad, merged in 1988 with Missouri Pacific Railroad, and finally merged in 1997 with Union Pacific Railroad. Most locals still refer to this railroad as the "Rock Island".

==== Chingawasa Springs Railroad ====
In 1889, the Marion Belt and Chingawasa Springs Railroad built a 4.5 mile railroad from Marion northeast to Chingawasa Springs. A hotel was built near the site of the spa at Chingawasa Springs, along with a depot and eatery. Both Santa Fe and Rock Island offered round trip fares from Chicago and western cities to Chingawasa Springs. An economic panic in 1893 closed down the health spa and hotel, and quarry business along the tracks never developed sufficiently. In 1893, the railroad ceased operations, and tracks were removed in 1910.

=== 20th century ===
The National Old Trails Road, also known as the Ocean-to-Ocean Highway, was established in 1912, and was routed through Lehigh, Hillsboro, Marion, and Lost Springs.

Peabody, and nearby Watchorn, experienced an oil boom from 1918 to 1920. The influence of the petroleum industry remained strong in Peabody, and resulted in the greatest change upon the community in the shortest time. More than 100 residences were constructed in October and November 1919. From 1918 to 1919, the population increased by 75% or more, but later decreased as oil booms in other Kansas areas needed the workers.

From 1935 to 1937, the Marion County Lake was constructed southeast of Marion. From 1964 to 1968, the Marion Reservoir was constructed northwest of Marion.

=== 21st century ===
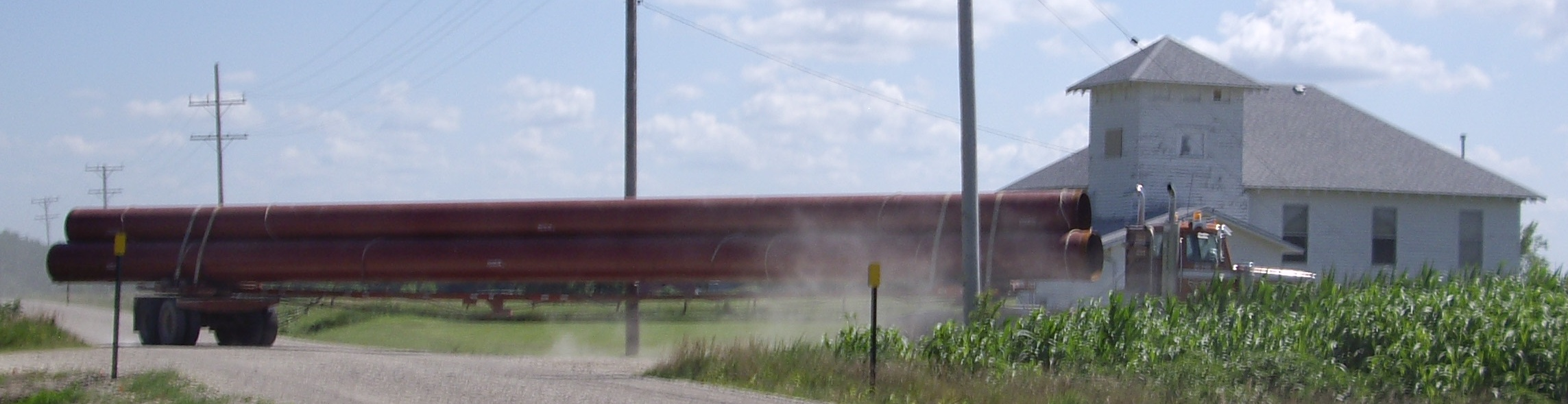
Truck hauling 36-inch pipe to build Keystone-Cushing Pipeline (Phase 2) southeast of Peabody

In 2010, the Keystone-Cushing Pipeline (Phase II) was constructed north to south through Marion County with much controversy over road damage, tax exemption, and environmental concerns (if a leak ever occurs).

In 2022, construction of the 201 megawatt Sunflower Wind farm was started in Marion County. Warning light and spin testing started in June 2023. This wind farm is located between Peabody, Aulne, and Florence, and operated by Ørsted headquartered in Fredericia, Denmark.

== Geography ==
According to the U.S. Census Bureau, the county has a total area of 954 square miles (2,470 km^{2}), of which 944 square miles (2,440 km^{2}) is land and 9.4 square miles (24 km^{2}) (1.0%) is water.

Marion County is located in the Great Plains, and the eastern part of the county is part of the Flint Hills.

=== Adjacent counties ===
- Dickinson County (north)
- Morris County (northeast)
- Chase County (east)
- Butler County (southeast)
- Harvey County (southwest)
- McPherson County (west)
- Saline County (northwest)

== Demographics ==
Historical population
Census	Pop.	Note	%±
1860	74		—
1870	768		937.8%
1880	12,453		1,521.5%
1890	20,539		64.9%
1900	20,676		0.7%
1910	22,415		8.4%
1920	22,923		2.3%
1930	20,739		−9.5%
1940	18,951		−8.6%
1950	16,307		−14.0%
1960	15,143		−7.1%
1970	13,935		−8.0%
1980	13,522		−3.0%
1990	12,888		−4.7%
2000	13,361		3.7%
2010	12,660		−5.2%
2020	11,823		−6.6%
2025 (est.)	11,634	▼	−1.6%
U.S. Decennial Census; 1790-1960 1900–1990; 1990-2000 2010–2020

=== Racial and ethnic composition ===
Marion County, Kansas – Racial and ethnic composition Note: the US Census treats Hispanic/Latino as an ethnic category. This table excludes Latinos from the racial categories and assigns them to a separate category. Hispanics/Latinos may be of any race.
Race / Ethnicity (NH = Non-Hispanic)	Pop 1980	Pop 1990	Pop 2000	Pop 2010	Pop 2020	% 1980	% 1990	% 2000	% 2010	% 2020
White alone (NH)	13,257	12,620	12,833	11,992	10,750	98.04%	97.92%	96.05%	94.72%	90.92%
Hispanic or Latino (any race)	140	118	257	296	442	1.04%	0.92%	1.92%	2.34%	3.74%
Mixed race or Multiracial (NH)	x	x	110	173	365	x	x	0.82%	1.37%	3.09%
Black or African American alone (NH)	58	82	63	95	118	0.43%	0.64%	0.47%	0.75%	1.00%
Native American or Alaska Native alone (NH)	34	34	71	63	35	0.25%	0.26%	0.53%	0.50%	0.30%
Asian alone (NH)	21	32	24	25	39	0.16%	0.25%	0.18%	0.20%	0.33%
Native Hawaiian or Pacific Islander alone (NH)	x	x	1	7	7	x	x	0.01%	0.06%	0.06%
Other race alone (NH)	12	2	2	9	67	0.09%	0.02%	0.01%	0.07%	0.57%
Total	13,522	12,888	13,361	12,660	11,823	100.00%	100.00%	100.00%	100.00%	100.00%

=== 2020 census ===
As of the 2020 census, the county had a population of 11,823. The median age was 44.6 years. 21.9% of residents were under the age of 18 and 23.5% of residents were 65 years of age or older. For every 100 females there were 100.0 males, and for every 100 females age 18 and over there were 98.0 males age 18 and over. 0.0% of residents lived in urban areas, while 100.0% lived in rural areas.

The racial makeup of the county was 92.3% White, 1.0% Black or African American, 0.5% American Indian and Alaska Native, 0.3% Asian, 0.1% Native Hawaiian and Pacific Islander, 1.5% from some other race, and 4.3% from two or more races. Hispanic or Latino residents of any race comprised 3.7% of the population.

There were 4,786 households in the county, of which 26.6% had children under the age of 18 living with them and 21.6% had a female householder with no spouse or partner present. About 29.0% of all households were made up of individuals and 15.1% had someone living alone who was 65 years of age or older.

There were 5,671 housing units, of which 15.6% were vacant. Among occupied housing units, 78.6% were owner-occupied and 21.4% were renter-occupied. The homeowner vacancy rate was 2.5% and the rental vacancy rate was 13.5%.

=== 2000 census ===
As of the census of 2000, there were 13,361 people, 5,114 households, and 3,687 families residing in the county. The population density was 14 people per square mile (5.4 people/km^{2}). There were 5,882 housing units at an average density of 6 per square mile (2.3/km^{2}). The racial makeup of the county was 97.06% White, 0.47% Black or African American, 0.59% Native American, 0.19% Asian, 0.01% Pacific Islander, 0.55% from other races, and 1.14% from two or more races. 1.92% of the population were Hispanic or Latino of any race.

There were 5,114 households, out of which 30.50% had children under the age of 18 living with them, 63.80% were married couples living together, 5.50% had a female householder with no husband present, and 27.90% were non-families. 25.20% of all households were made up of individuals, and 14.20% had someone living alone who was 65 years of age or older. The average household size was 2.46 and the average family size was 2.94.

In the county, the population was spread out, with 24.80% under the age of 18, 7.90% from 18 to 24, 23.50% from 25 to 44, 22.70% from 45 to 64, and 21.10% who were 65 years of age or older. The median age was 41 years. For every 100 females there were 95.10 males. For every 100 females age 18 and over, there were 92.20 males.

The median income for a household in the county was $34,500, and the median income for a family was $41,386. Males had a median income of $30,236 versus $21,119 for females. The per capita income for the county was $16,100. About 4.80% of families and 8.30% of the population were below the poverty line, including 9.50% of those under age 18 and 9.70% of those age 65 or over.

== Government ==
=== Presidential elections ===
Presidential election results

United States presidential election results for Marion County, Kansas
Year	Republican		Democratic		Third party(ies)	
Year	No.	%	No.	%	No.	%
1888	2,375	60.16%	1,283	32.50%	290	7.35%
1892	2,210	55.82%	0	0.00%	1,749	44.18%
1896	2,285	56.60%	1,699	42.09%	53	1.31%
1900	2,623	59.67%	1,729	39.33%	44	1.00%
1904	2,705	71.20%	928	24.43%	166	4.37%
1908	2,546	57.45%	1,747	39.42%	139	3.14%
1912	863	19.98%	1,732	40.10%	1,724	39.92%
1916	3,453	52.14%	2,790	42.13%	379	5.72%
1920	3,840	65.82%	1,713	29.36%	281	4.82%
1924	4,008	56.38%	1,520	21.38%	1,581	22.24%
1928	5,446	73.50%	1,938	26.15%	26	0.35%
1932	3,220	41.74%	4,366	56.59%	129	1.67%
1936	4,185	49.67%	4,207	49.93%	34	0.40%
1940	5,764	67.44%	2,724	31.87%	59	0.69%
1944	5,219	72.64%	1,925	26.79%	41	0.57%
1948	4,724	64.85%	2,421	33.23%	140	1.92%
1952	6,228	80.19%	1,361	17.52%	178	2.29%
1956	5,318	75.99%	1,644	23.49%	36	0.51%
1960	5,250	73.20%	1,904	26.55%	18	0.25%
1964	3,481	54.90%	2,792	44.03%	68	1.07%
1968	4,287	70.37%	1,494	24.52%	311	5.11%
1972	4,373	72.17%	1,478	24.39%	208	3.43%
1976	3,226	50.72%	3,004	47.23%	130	2.04%
1980	3,960	64.39%	1,569	25.51%	621	10.10%
1984	4,407	72.06%	1,632	26.68%	77	1.26%
1988	3,685	62.99%	2,024	34.60%	141	2.41%
1992	3,142	49.47%	1,627	25.62%	1,582	24.91%
1996	4,173	65.32%	1,673	26.19%	543	8.50%
2000	4,156	70.40%	1,475	24.99%	272	4.61%
2004	4,516	73.32%	1,536	24.94%	107	1.74%
2008	4,159	68.64%	1,801	29.72%	99	1.63%
2012	3,889	71.90%	1,385	25.61%	135	2.50%
2016	4,003	71.18%	1,204	21.41%	417	7.41%
2020	4,465	73.06%	1,516	24.81%	130	2.13%
2024	4,312	73.46%	1,429	24.34%	129	2.20%

=== Laws ===
Following amendment to the Kansas Constitution in 1986, the county remained a prohibition, or "dry", county until 2004, when voters approved the sale of alcoholic liquor by the individual drink with a 30 percent food sales requirement.

== Education ==
=== Colleges ===
- Tabor College, in Hillsboro
- Butler Community College (remote campus), in Marion

=== Unified school districts ===
The following public unified school districts are headquartered in Marion County.

- Centre USD 397, in a rural area between Lost Springs and Lincolnville
- Peabody–Burns USD 398, in Peabody
- Marion–Florence USD 408, in Marion
- Hillsboro USD 410, in Hillsboro
- Goessel USD 411, in Goessel

== Communities ==
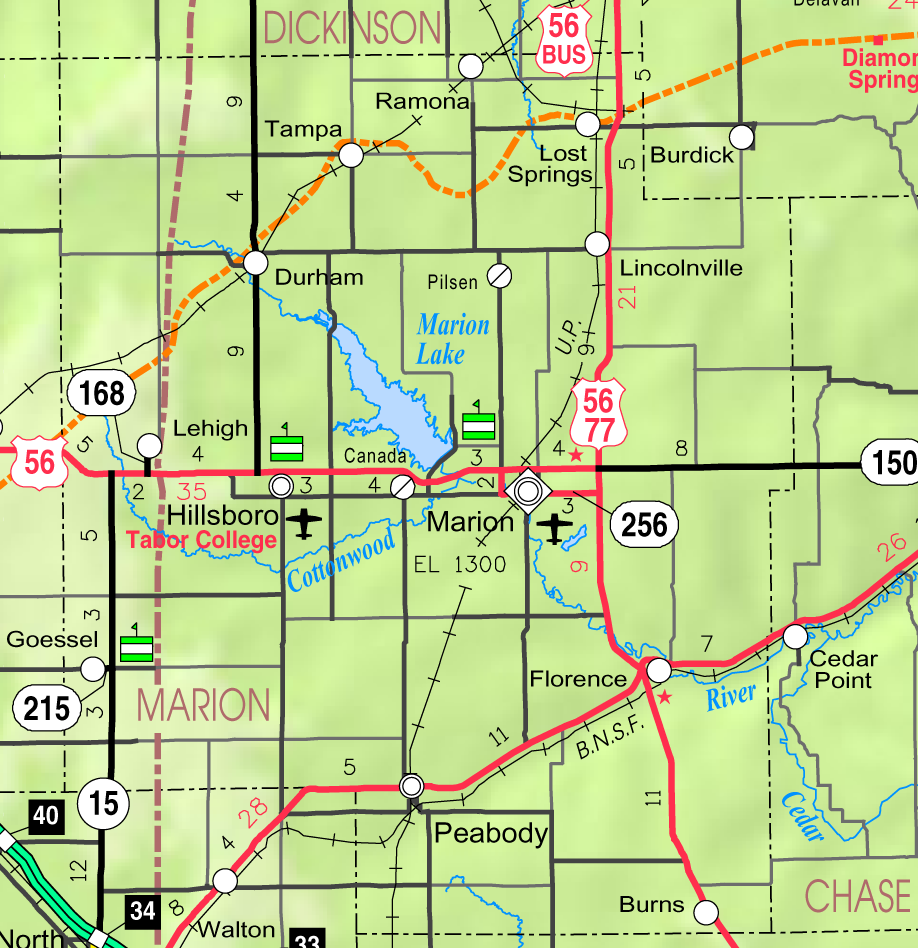
2005 map of Marion County (legend)

List of townships / incorporated cities / unincorporated communities / extinct former communities within Marion County.

=== Cities ===
- Burns - originally named St. Francis
- Durham - originally named Durham Park
- Florence
- Goessel - originally named Gnadenfeld
- Hillsboro - originally named Hill City
- Lehigh
- Lincolnville
- Lost Springs
- Marion (county seat) - originally named Marion Centre
- Peabody - originally named Coneburg
- Ramona
- Tampa

=== Unincorporated communities ===
† means a community is designated a Census-Designated Place (CDP) by the United States Census Bureau.

- Antelope
- Aulne
- Canada
- Eastshore†
- Marion County Lake
- Pilsen†

=== Ghost towns ===
Marion County contained early communities that have long since been abandoned.

Rail Towns / Stations / Cattle Pens

- Hampson, station, approximately five miles south of Florence.
- Horners (Honner), station and cattle pens, approximately three miles northeast of Peabody.
- Jacobs, TBD, northwest of Lost Springs.
- Oursler, station and tiny community.
- Quarry, station and limestone rock quarry, approximately 5.5 miles north of Marion.
- Wagner, TBD, southwest of Florence.
- Waldeck, station, cattle pens, and tiny community.

Oil Towns

- Watchorn, five miles east of Peabody.

Other

- Creswell (or Cresswell), east of Goessel
- Elk‡, northeast of Marion (straddled Chase County border)
- Fred, between Peabody and Hillsboro
- Kuhnbrook
- Morning Star
- Strassburg
- Youngtown, northeast of Marion

Mennonite Villages

- Alexanderfeld
- Ebenfeld
- Friedenstal (Alvin)
- Gnadenau (Grace Meadow)
- Hoffnungsthal (Hope Valley)
- Schoenthal (Fair Valley)
- Steinbach

Alexanderwohl Mennonite Villages, (see Alexanderwohl Mennonite Church)

- Blumenfeld (straddled on McPherson County border)
- Blumenort (straddled on McPherson County border)
- Emmathal
- Gnadenfeld
- Gnadenthal
- Gruenfeld (Green Field) (abandoned then later became Goessel)
- Hochfeld
- Springfield

=== Townships ===
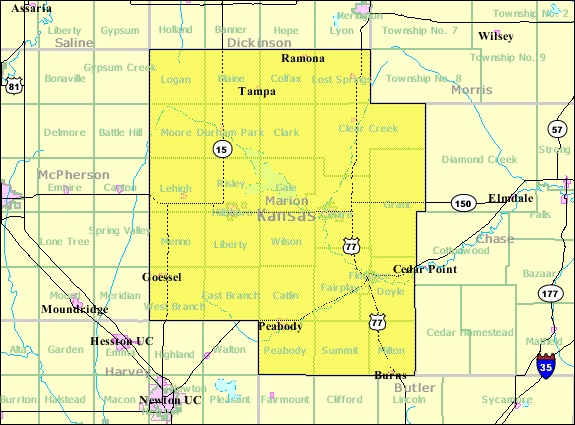
Map of Marion County with township boundaries.

Marion County is divided into twenty-four townships. The cities of Florence (in Doyle and Fairplay townships), Hillsboro (in Liberty and Risley townships), and Marion (in Centre township) are considered governmentally independent and are excluded from the census figures for the townships. In the following table, the population center is the largest city (or cities) included in that township's population total, if it is of a significant size.

Sources: 2000 U.S. Gazetteer from the U.S. Census Bureau.
Township	FIPS	Population center	Population (2000)	Population density /km^{2} (/sq mi)	Land area km^{2} (sq mi)	Water area km^{2} (sq mi)	Water %	Geographic coordinates
Blaine	07125	Tampa	212	2 (6)	93 (36)	0 (0)	0.33%	38°33′30″N 97°10′46″W
Catlin	11075	Peabody	180	2 (5)	93 (36)	0 (0)	0.05%	38°12′56″N 97°5′14″W
Centre	11825	*	535	4 (11)	128 (49)	0 (0)	0.26%	38°20′36″N 96°59′39″W
Clark	13500	Pilsen	149	2 (4)	93 (36)	0 (0)	0.42%	38°28′17″N 97°6′4″W
Clear Creek	13750	Lincolnville	592	3 (8)	196 (76)	0 (0)	0.06%	38°28′1″N 96°57′35″W
Colfax	14800	Ramona	218	2 (6)	93 (36)	0 (0)	0.01%	38°34′42″N 97°5′28″W
Doyle	18550	*	75	1 (2)	98 (38)	0 (0)	0.08%	38°14′3″N 96°53′17″W
Durham Park	19100	Durham	230	3 (7)	90 (35)	3 (1)	2.70%	38°29′9″N 97°12′46″W
East Branch	19325	n/a	188	2 (5)	92 (35)	0 (0)	0%	38°13′33″N 97°11′53″W
Fairplay	22350	*	121	1 (3)	116 (45)	0 (0)	0.04%	38°13′44″N 96°59′23″W
Gale	25075	Eastshore	220	3 (8)	67 (26)	21 (8)	23.70%	38°23′15″N 97°5′21″W
Grant	27775	n/a	128	1 (2)	174 (67)	0 (0)	0.08%	38°22′13″N 96°53′3″W
Lehigh	39250	Lehigh	370	4 (10)	93 (36)	0 (0)	0%	38°23′3″N 97°18′27″W
Liberty	40225	*	327	4 (9)	92 (35)	0 (0)	0%	38°18′13″N 97°12′37″W
Logan	41950	n/a	127	1 (4)	94 (36)	0 (0)	0.07%	38°32′38″N 97°19′34″W
Lost Springs	42850	Lost Springs	201	2 (6)	93 (36)	0 (0)	0.01%	38°34′14″N 96°58′23″W
Menno	45800	n/a	317	3 (9)	93 (36)	0 (0)	0.12%	38°18′50″N 97°18′34″W
Milton	46900	Burns	348	4 (12)	78 (30)	0 (0)	0.03%	38°6′6″N 96°53′4″W
Moore	48100	n/a	65	1 (2)	93 (36)	0 (0)	0.03%	38°29′27″N 97°19′39″W
Peabody	55125	Peabody	1,544	16 (42)	95 (37)	0 (0)	0.23%	38°9′40″N 97°6′22″W
Risley	60000	*	241	3 (7)	89 (34)	1 (0)	1.36%	38°23′56″N 97°11′48″W
Summit	69100	n/a	82	1 (2)	92 (36)	0 (0)	0.51%	38°7′21″N 96°58′54″W
West Branch	76775	Goessel	1,024	11 (29)	92 (36)	0 (0)	0.01%	38°13′30″N 97°19′35″W
Wilson	79750	Aulne	232	2 (6)	94 (36)	0 (0)	0%	38°18′17″N 97°5′19″W

== Historical maps ==
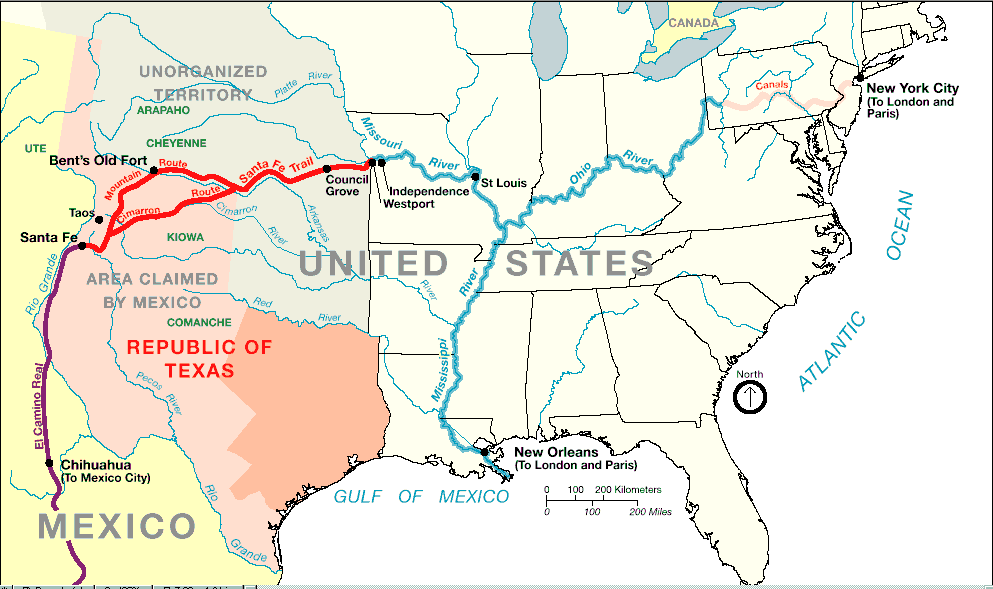
1845 Santa Fe Trail map.

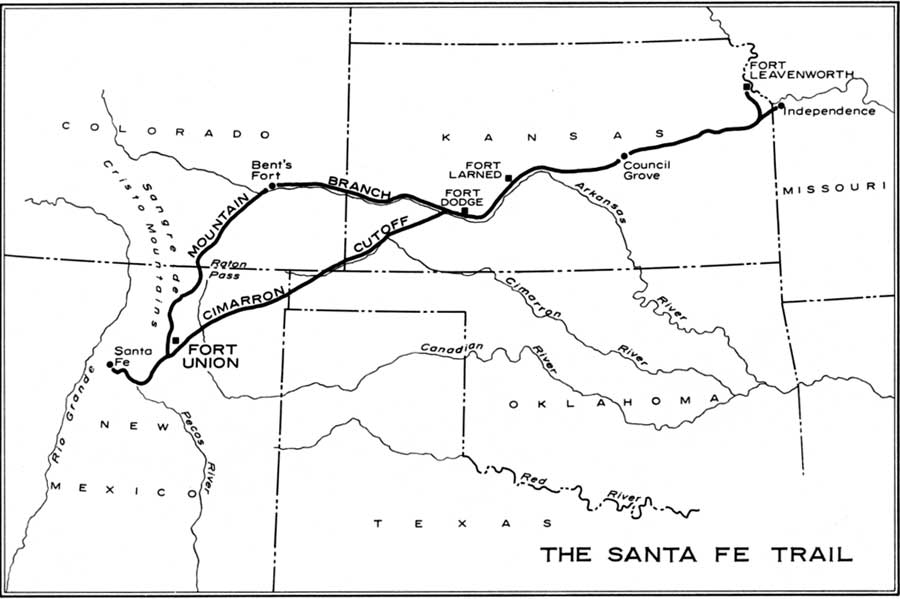
1860 Santa Fe Trail map.

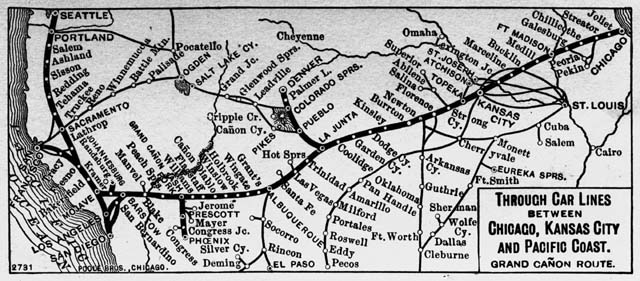
1900-1905 Atchison, Topeka & Santa Fe Railway route map of regular stops.

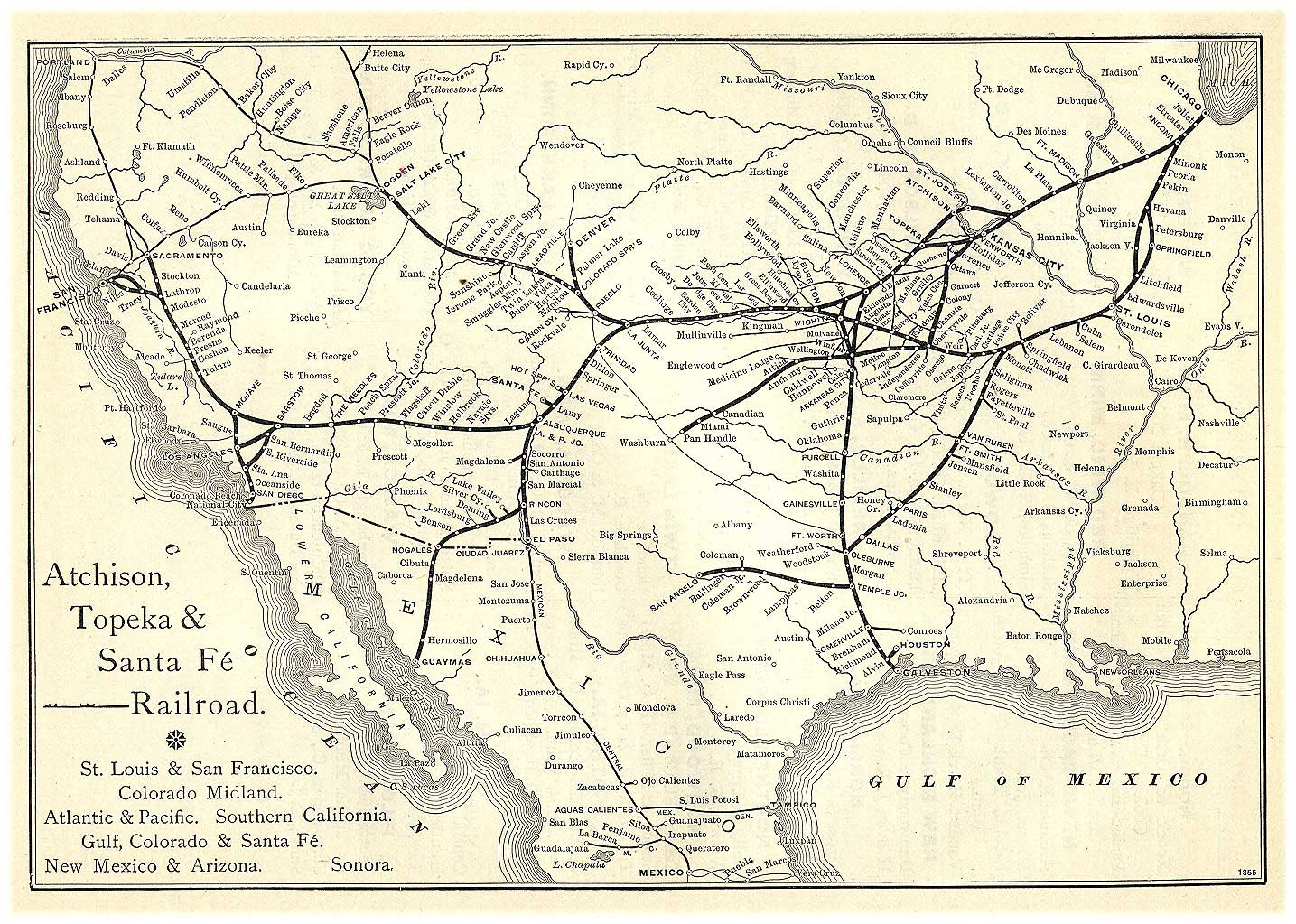
1891 Atchison, Topeka & Santa Fe Railway route map from Grain Dealers and Shippers Gazetteer.

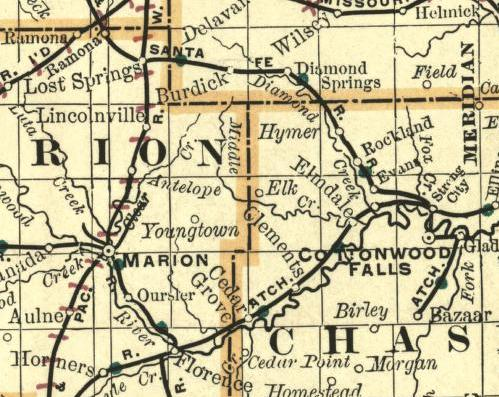
1893 railroad map.

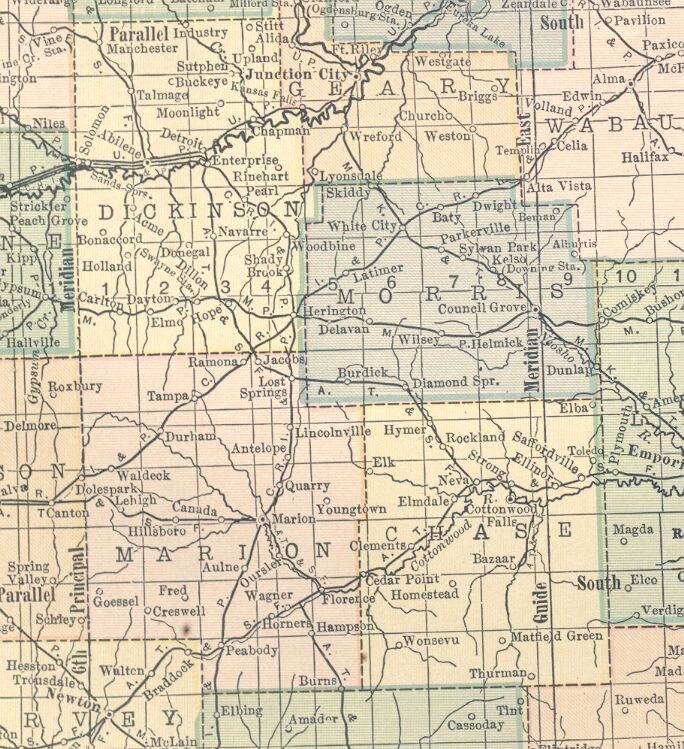
1914 railroad map.

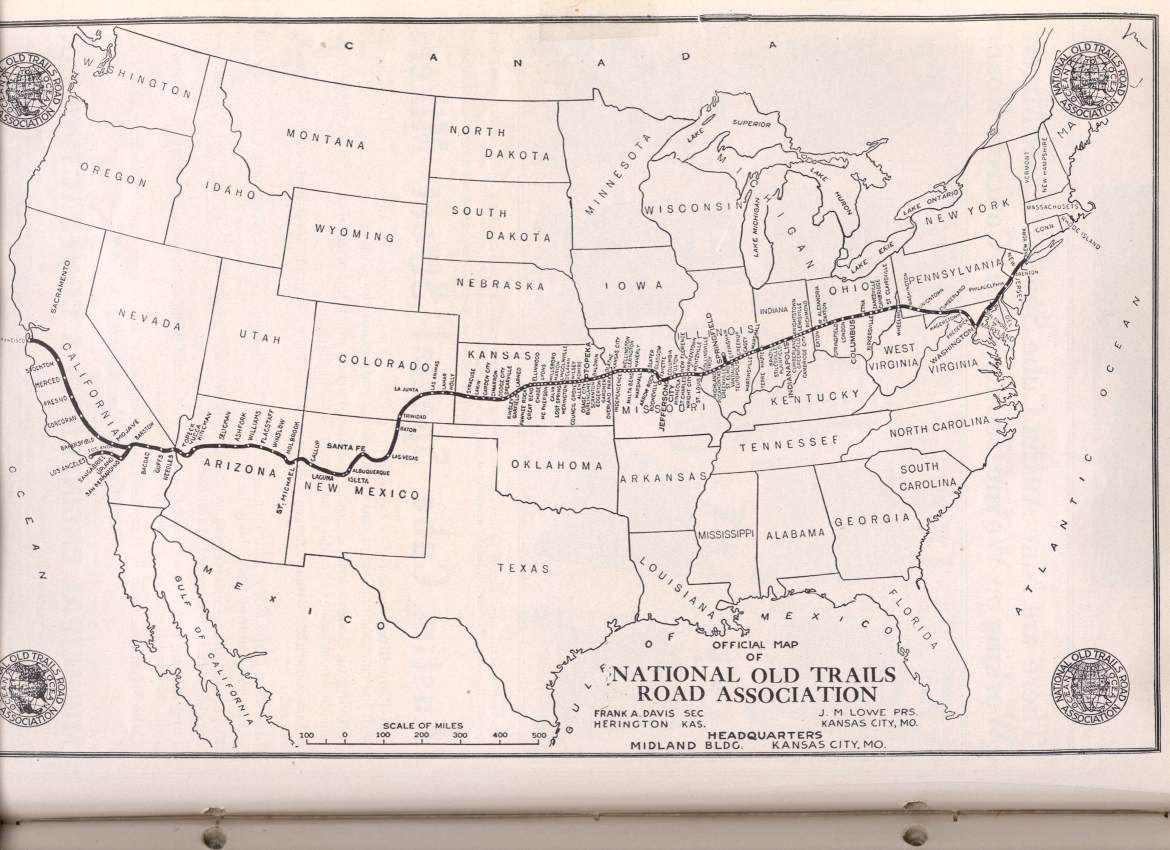
1910s-1920s National Old Trails Road map.

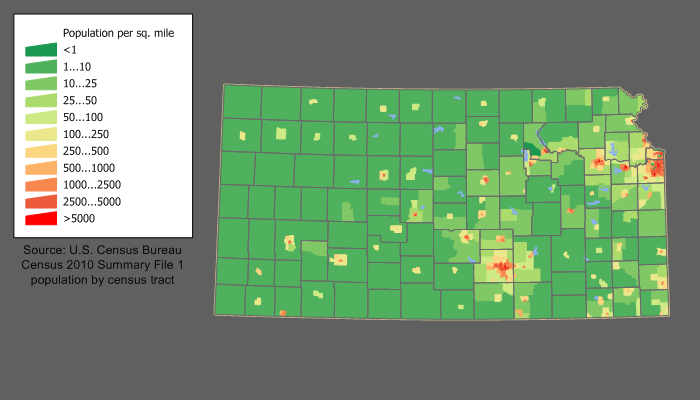
2000 Kansas Population map.

1893 map of Kansas.

== Media ==
=== Print ===
- Hillsboro Free Press, local newspaper for Hillsboro.
- Marion County Record, local newspaper for Marion.
- Peabody Gazette-Bulletin, local newspaper for Peabody.
- Hillsboro Star-Journal, local newspaper for the greater Marion County area.
- The Newton Kansan, regional newspaper from Newton.
- The Wichita Eagle, major regional newspaper from Wichita.

== See also ==
- National Register of Historic Places listings in Marion County, Kansas
- Cottonwood River and Great Flood of 1951
- March 1990 Central US tornado outbreak
- Public Land Survey System
- Chisholm Trail and Route of the Trail in Kansas
- Santa Fe Trail
- Geology of Kansas
- List of wind farms in the United States - Sunflower Farm wind farm is located in Marion County
