= Fairplay Township, Kansas =

Fairplay Township Marion County, Kansas
- Township
- Location within Marion County

- Location within the state of Kansas
- Coordinates: 38.2340855°N 96.9898118°W
- Country: United States
- State: Kansas
- County: Marion

Area
  - Total: 45 sq mi (120 km^{2})

Dimensions
  - Length: 8.0 mi (12.9 km)
  - Width: 6.0 mi (9.7 km)
- Elevation: 1,371 ft (418 m)

Population (2020)
  - Total: 93
  - Density: 2.1/sq mi (0.80/km^{2})
- Time zone: UTC-6 (CST)
  - Summer (DST): UTC-5 (CDT)
- Area code: 620
- FIPS code: 20-22350
- GNIS ID: 477371
- Website: County website

Fairplay Township is a township in Marion County, Kansas, United States. As of the 2020 census, the township population was 93, not including the city of Florence.

== Geography ==
Fairplay Township covers an area of 45 square miles (116.5 km^{2}).

== Communities ==
The township contains the following settlements:

- City of Florence (west part). The east part of Florence is located in Doyle Township.
- Ghost town of Oursler.

== Cemeteries ==
The township contains the following cemeteries:

- Allison Cemetery (no longer in use), located in Section 13 T21S R4E.
- St. Patrick's Catholic Cemetery (aka Mount Calvary Cemetery), located in Section 14 T21S R5E.

== Transportation ==
U.S. Route 50 and U.S. Route 77 pass through the township.
