= Peabody Gazette-Bulletin =

- Type: Weekly newspaper
- Format: Broadsheet
- Owner(s): Hoch Publishing
- Publisher: Eric Meyer
- News editor: Mindy Kepfield
- Founded: 1873
- Headquarters: 117 S. 3rd St. Marion, Kansas 66861; United States
- Circulation: 1,166
- Website: peabodykansas.com

The Peabody Gazette-Bulletin is a local weekly newspaper for the cities of Peabody, Burns, Florence in the state of Kansas. The paper publishes every Wednesday. The newspaper also maintains an online presence.

== History ==
The Peabody Gazette newspaper was founded in 1873 by J.P. Church. There was a daily edition in 1887 by W.H. Morgan, but it went back to a weekly edition during the same year. The Peabody Graphic newspaper existed from May 20 to June 19 of 1891. The Peabody Herald newspaper was founded in 1911 by C.T. Weaver. The Gazette and Herald consolidated into the Peabody Gazette-Herald in 1915 by Oscar S. Stauffer.

== Notable editors ==
- Oscar Stanley Stauffer, founder of Stauffer Communications, editor of Peabody Gazette-Herald newspaper from 1915 to 1922.

== See also ==
The other newspapers in Marion County are Hillsboro Free Press, Hillsboro Star-Journal, Marion County Record.
