= Doyle Township, Kansas =

Doyle Township Marion County, Kansas
- Township
- Location within Marion County

- Location within the state of Kansas
- Coordinates: 38.2216839°N 96.8898788°W
- Country: United States
- State: Kansas
- County: Marion

Area
  - Total: 35.5 sq mi (92 km^{2})

Dimensions
  - Length: 6.5 mi (10.5 km)
  - Width: 6.0 mi (9.7 km)
- Elevation: 1,375 ft (419 m)

Population (2020)
  - Total: 35
  - Density: 0.99/sq mi (0.38/km^{2})
- Time zone: UTC-6 (CST)
  - Summer (DST): UTC-5 (CDT)
- Area code: 620
- FIPS code: 20-18550
- GNIS ID: 477381
- Website: County website

Doyle Township is a township in Marion County, Kansas, United States. As of the 2020 census, the township population was 35, not including the city of Florence. Doyle was first settled by Euro-Americans in 1858.

== Geography ==
Doyle Township covers an area of 35.5 square miles (91.9 km^{2}).

== Communities ==
The township contains the following settlements:

- City of Florence (eastern part). The western section of Florence is located in Fairplay Township.
- Ghost town of Hampson.

== Cemeteries ==
The township contains the following cemeteries:

- Florence City Cemetery (aka Hillcrest Cemetery), located in Section 6 T21S R5E.

== Transportation ==
U.S. Route 50 and U.S. Route 77 pass through the township.
