= Wilson Township =

Wilson Township may refer to the following places in the United States:

== Arkansas ==
- Wilson Township, Clay County, Arkansas
- Wilson Township, Faulkner County, Arkansas
- Wilson Township, Fulton County, Arkansas
- Wilson Township, Pope County, Arkansas
- Wilson Township, Stone County, Arkansas

== Illinois ==
- Wilson Township, DeWitt County, Illinois

== Iowa ==
- Wilson Township, Osceola County, Iowa

== Kansas ==
- Wilson Township, Ellsworth County, Kansas
- Wilson Township, Lane County, Kansas
- Wilson Township, Marion County, Kansas
- Wilson Township, Rice County, Kansas

== Michigan ==
- Wilson Township, Alpena County, Michigan
- Wilson Township, Charlevoix County, Michigan

== Minnesota ==
- Wilson Township, Cass County, Minnesota
- Wilson Township, Winona County, Minnesota

== Missouri ==
- Wilson Township, Adair County, Missouri
- Wilson Township, Audrain County, Missouri
- Wilson Township, Dallas County, Missouri
- Wilson Township, Gentry County, Missouri
- Wilson Township, Greene County, Missouri
- Wilson Township, Grundy County, Missouri
- Wilson Township, Putnam County, Missouri

== North Carolina ==
- Wilson Township, Wilson County, North Carolina

== North Dakota ==
- Wilson Township, Burleigh County, North Dakota

== Ohio ==
- Wilson Township, Clinton County, Ohio

== Oklahoma ==
- Wilson Township, Atoka County, Oklahoma
- Wilson Township, Carter County, Oklahoma
- Wilson Township, Choctaw County, Oklahoma
- Wilson Township, Harper County, Oklahoma
- Wilson Township, McCurtain County, Oklahoma

== South Dakota ==
- Wilson Township, Perkins County, South Dakota

== See also ==
- Wilson (disambiguation)
