= Hillsboro Free Press =

Newspaper in Hillsboro, Kansas

- Type: Weekly newspaper
- Format: Broadsheet
- Editor: Don Ratzlaff
- Headquarters: 116 South Main Street; Hillsboro, Kansas 67063; United States
- Circulation: 7,300
- Website: hillsborofreepress.com

The Hillsboro Free Press is a local weekly newspaper from Hillsboro, Kansas. The paper publishes every Wednesday. It is one of two newspapers in the city, the other being the Hillsboro Star-Journal.

== See also ==
The other newspapers in Marion County are Hillsboro Star-Journal, Marion County Record, Peabody Gazette-Bulletin.
