= Wilson Township, Marion County, Kansas =

Wilson Township Marion County, Kansas
- Township
- Location within Marion County

- Location within the state of Kansas
- Coordinates: 38.3045813°N 97.0954760°W
- Country: United States
- State: Kansas
- County: Marion

Area
  - Total: 36 sq mi (93 km^{2})

Dimensions
  - Length: 6.0 mi (9.7 km)
  - Width: 6.0 mi (9.7 km)
- Elevation: 1,355 ft (413 m)

Population (2020)
  - Total: 220
  - Density: 6.1/sq mi (2.4/km^{2})
- Time zone: UTC-6 (CST)
  - Summer (DST): UTC-5 (CDT)
- Area code: 620
- FIPS code: 20-79750
- GNIS ID: 477362
- Website: County website

Wilson Township is a township in Marion County, Kansas, United States. As of the 2020 census, the township population was 220, including Aulne.

== Geography ==
Wilson Township covers an area of 36 square miles (93.2 km^{2}).

== Communities ==
The township contains the following settlements:

- Unincorporated community of Aulne.

== Cemeteries ==
The township contains the following cemeteries:

- Cedar Rest Cemetery (a.k.a. Marion County Home Cemetery or Poor Farm Cemetery), located in Section 16 T20S R3E.
- Spring Branch Catholic Cemetery, located in Section 21 T20S R3E.
