= Dharmachakra =

Symbol in Dharmic religions

The ancient Dharmachakra symbol used by Emperor Ashoka

The dharmachakra (Sanskrit: धर्मचक्र dharmacakra, Pali: dhammacakka) or wheel of dharma is a symbol used in the Dharmic religions. It has a widespread use in Buddhism. The dharmachakra is considered one of the ashtamangala (auspicious signs) in Hinduism and Buddhism. In some specific regional sites like in Odisha, dharmachakra imagery in Hindu temples has been linked to sites with an earlier Buddhist presence. The symbol also finds its usage in modern India, most notably at the centre of the flag of India.

Outside India, the dharmachakra has also been used as a decoration in Southeast Asian statues and inscriptions, beginning with the earliest period of Buddhism in Southeast Asia. It remains a major symbol of the Buddhist religion today.

== Etymology ==
The Sanskrit noun dharma (धर्म) is a derivation from the root dhṛ 'to hold, maintain, keep', and means 'what is established or firm'. The word derives from the Vedic Sanskrit n-stem dharman- with the meaning "bearer, supporter". The historical Vedic religion apparently conceived of dharma as an aspect of Ṛta.

== History and usage ==
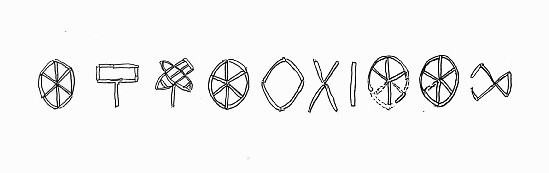
Ten Indus characters from the northern gate of Dholavira, dubbed the Dholavira Signboard.

Similar chakra (spoked-wheel) symbols are among the most ancient in all Indian history. Madhavan and Parpola note that a wheel symbol appears frequently in Indus Valley Civilisation artifacts, particularly on several seals. (Note: These symbols, however, are elongated and not circular. Spoked wheel vehicle are virtually absent in Harappan civilisation. Therefore interpreting these symbols as spoked wheel is a matter of debate.) Notably, it is present in a sequence of ten signs on the Dholavira Signboard.

Some historians associate the ancient chakra symbols with solar symbolism. In the Vedas, the god Surya is associated with the solar disc, which is said to be a chariot of one wheel (cakra). Mitra, a form of Surya, is described as "the eye of the world", and thus the sun is conceived of as an eye (cakṣu) which illuminates and perceives the world. Such a wheel is also the main attribute of Vishnu. Thus, a wheel symbol might also be associated with light and knowledge.

=== Buddhist usage and significance ===
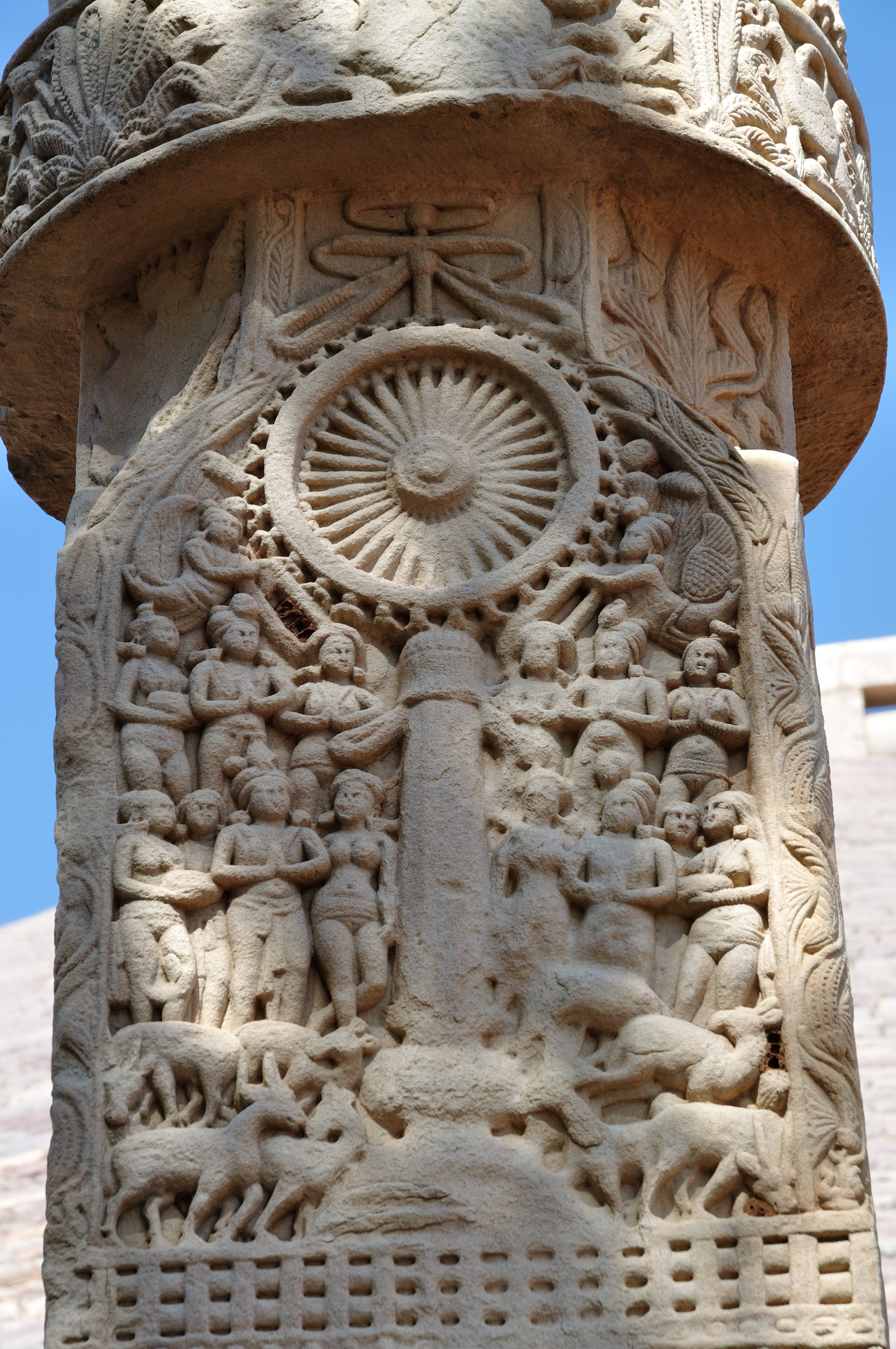
Worshipers and Dharmachakra, Sanchi Stupa, South Face, West Pillar.

In Buddhism, the Dharma Chakra is widely used to represent the Buddha's Dharma (Buddha's teaching and the universal moral order), Gautama Buddha himself and the walking of the path to enlightenment, since the time of Early Buddhism. (Note: Grünwedel e.a.:"The wheel (dharmachakra) as already mentioned, was adopted by Buddha's disciples as the symbol of his doctrine, and combined with other symbols—a trident placed above it, etc.—stands for him on the sculptures of the Asoka period.") The symbol is also sometimes connected to the Four Noble Truths, the Noble Eightfold Path and Dependent Origination. The pre-Buddhist dharmachakra (Pali: dhammacakka) is considered one of the ashtamangala (auspicious signs) in Hinduism and Buddhism and often used as a symbol of both faiths. (Note: Goetz: "dharmachakra, symbol of the Buddhist faith".) It is one of the oldest known Indian symbols found in Indian art, appearing with the first surviving post-Indus Valley Civilisation Indian iconography in the time of the Buddhist king Ashoka.

The Buddha is said to have set the "wheel of dharma" in motion when he delivered his first sermon, which is described in the Dhammacakkappavattana Sutta. This "turning of the wheel" signifies a great and revolutionary change with universal consequences, brought about by an exceptional human being. Buddhism adopted the wheel as a symbol from the Indian mythical idea of the ideal king, called a chakravartin ("wheel-turner", or "universal monarch"), who was said to possess several mythical objects, including the ratana cakka (the ideal wheel). The Mahā Sudassana Sutta of the Dīgha Nikāya describes this wheel as having a nave (nābhi), a thousand spokes (sahassārāni) and a felly (nemi), all of which are perfect in every respect. Siddhartha Gautama was said to have been a "mahapurisa" (great man) who could have chosen to become a wheel turning king, but instead became the spiritual counterpart to such a king, a wheel turning sage, that is, a Buddha.

In his explanation of the term "turning the wheel of Dharma", the Theravada exegete Buddhaghosa explains that this "wheel" which the Buddha turned is primarily to be understood as wisdom, knowledge, and insight (ñāṇa). This wisdom has two aspects, paṭivedha-ñāṇa, the wisdom of self-realisation of the Truth and desanā-ñāṇa, the wisdom of proclamation of the Truth. The dharmachakra symbol also points to the central Indian idea of "Dharma", a complex and multivalent term which refers to the eternal cosmic law, universal moral order and in Buddhism, the very teaching and path expounded by the Buddha. In the evolving Mahāyāna traditions, the motif of turning the wheel a second time served an important rhetorical function to promote novel perspectives.

In Buddhist art at early sites such as Bharhut and Sanchi, the dharmachakra was often used as a symbol of Gautama Buddha himself. The symbol is often paired with the triratna (triple jewel) or trishula (trident) symbolizing the triple gem, umbrellas (chatra), symbols of sovereignty and royal power, gems and garlands. It is also sometimes depicted alongside animals such as lions, or deer.

There are different designs of the Buddhist dharmachakra with 8, 12, 24 or more spokes. In different Buddhist traditions, the different number of spokes may represent different aspects of the Buddha's Dharma (teaching). In the Indo-Tibetan Buddhist tradition for example, the 8 spoked wheel represents the noble eightfold path, and the hub, rim and spokes are also said to represent the three trainings (sila, prajña and samadhi).

In Buddhism, the cyclical movement of a wheel is also used to symbolize the cyclical nature of life in the world (also referred to as the "wheel of samsara", samsara-chakra or the "wheel of becoming", bhava-cakra). This wheel of suffering can be reversed or "turned" through the practice of the Buddhist path. The Buddhist terms for "suffering" (dukkha) and happiness (sukha) may also originally be related to the proper or improper fitting of wheels on a chariot's axle. The Indo-Tibetan tradition has developed elaborate depictions called Bhavacakras which depict the many realms of rebirth in Buddhist cosmology.

The spokes of a wheel are also often used as symbols of the Buddhist doctrine of dependent origination. According to the Theravada scholar Buddhaghosa:

"It is the beginningless round of rebirths that is called the 'Wheel of the round of rebirths' (saṃsāracakka). Ignorance (avijjā) is its hub (or nave) because it is its root. Ageing-and-death (jarā-maraṇa) is its rim (or felly) because it terminates it. The remaining ten links [of Dependent Origination] are its spokes [i.e. saṅkhāra up to the process of becoming, bhava]."

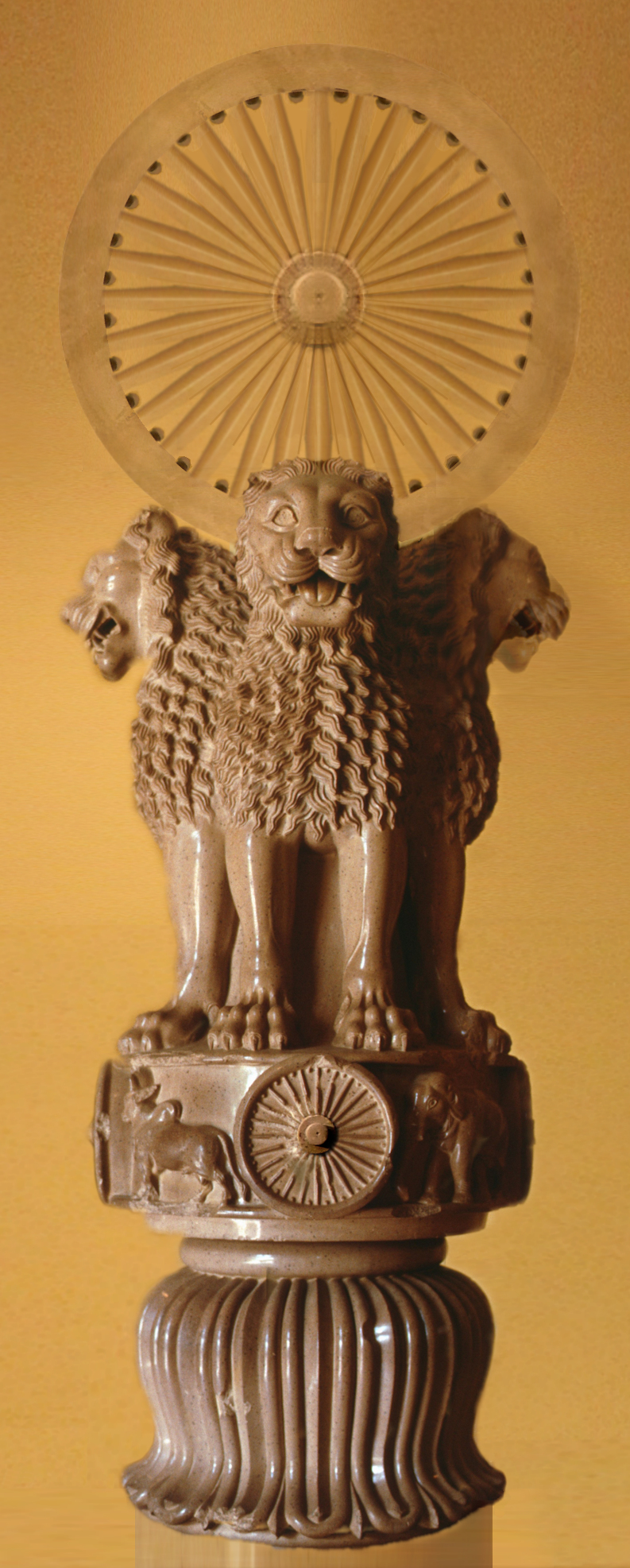
The original Lion Capital of Ashoka, from Sarnath. It originally supported a large dharmachakra on the top (reconstitution).

The earliest Indian monument featuring dharmachakras are the Ashokan Pillars, such as the lion pillar at Sanchi, built at the behest of the Mauryan emperor Ashoka. According to Benjamin Rowland:

"The Sārnāth column may be interpreted, therefore, not only as a glorification of the Buddha's preaching symbolised by the crowning wheel, but also through the cosmological implications of the whole pillar as a symbol of the universal extension of the power of the Buddha's Law as typified by the sun that dominates all space and all time, and simultaneously an emblem of the universal extension of Mauryan imperialism through the Dharma. The whole structure is then a translation of age-old Indian and Asiatic cosmology into artistic terms of essentially foreign origin and dedicated, like all Asoka's monuments, to the glory of Buddhism and the royal house."

The largest surviving group of free-standing stone dharmachakras was made much later and far to the east. Eng Jin Ooi and Peter Skilling count at least forty from the Dvaravati culture of present-day Thailand, about twelve of them inscribed, coming mainly from Lopburi, Suphan Buri, Chai Nat, Nakhon Pathom, Ratchaburi, Phetchaburi and Nakhon Sawan. Bands of pearls frame the felloe on either face; between the bands the felloe is usually flat and filled with pattern, and the outer edge carries a design Robert Brown called "foliage growth". The spokes take a form of Greek ionic capital, with three rings before the column and the middle ring banded with pearls. A wheel of this kind stood on an octagonal pillar set on a circular brick base, held by a stone bracket, with lions below it and a deer nearby. Ooi and Skilling surmise that making wheels on this scale was a devotional practice particular to Dvaravati, since it is not found in other regions where Theravada was practised.

The pairing of the wheel with deer, which stands for the Deer Park at Sarnath, developed in India and is seen in stone reliefs from south to north. It appears on the clay seals of the vihāra at Nālandā and on the sculptures of Phanagiri in Telangana, and it still stands on the roof-ridges of Tibetan monasteries. The four-lion capitals of Aśoka at Sarnath and Sanchi are thought to have carried dharmachakras as well.

According to Harrison, the symbolism of "the wheel of the law" and the order of Nature is also visible in the Tibetan prayer wheels. The moving wheels symbolize the movement of cosmic order (ṛta).

=== Buddha Dhamma and its modern Indian usage ===
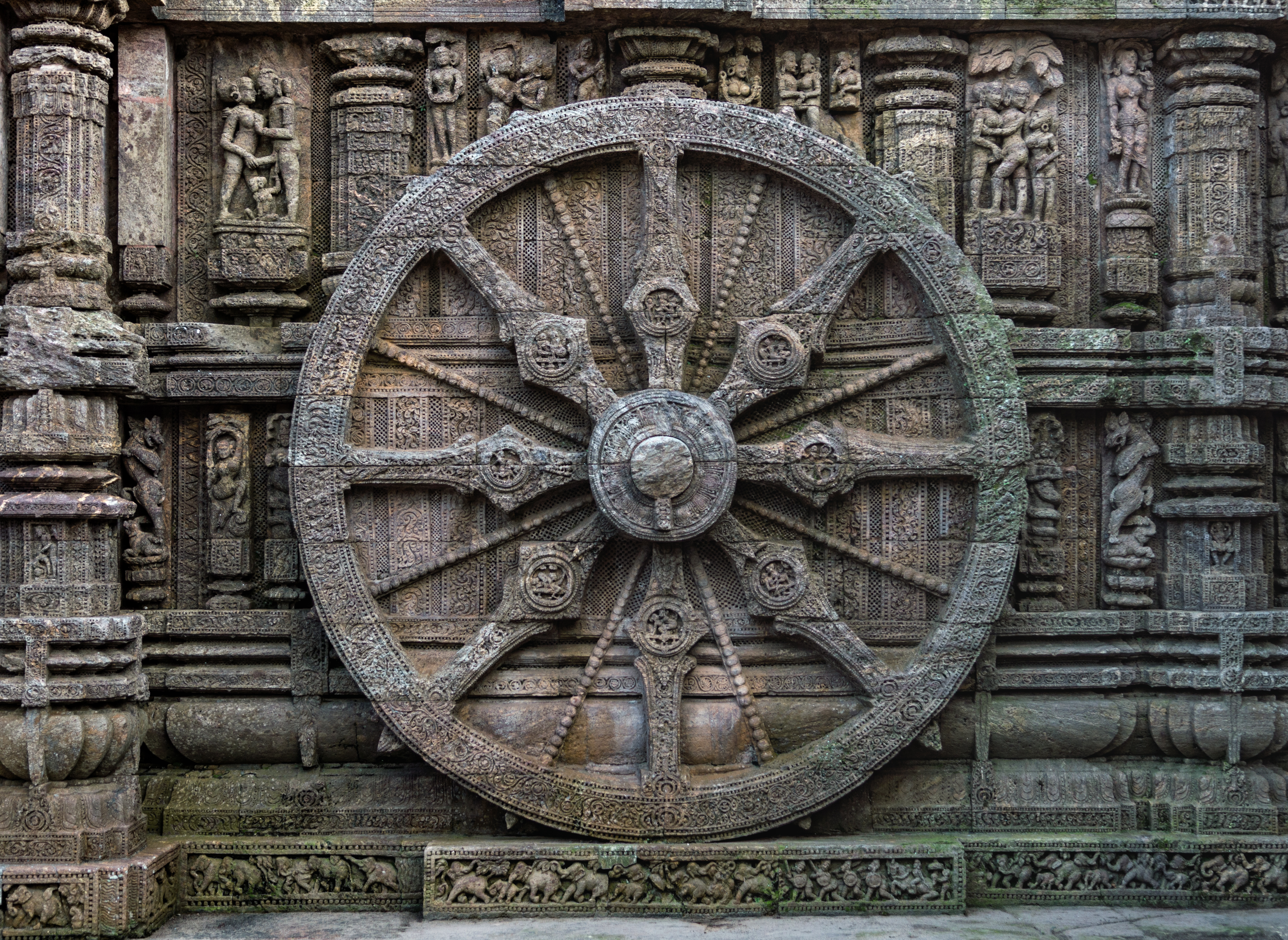
Wheel of the chariot of the sun, Konark Sun Temple.

The State Emblem of India features the 24 spoke Dharmachakra from the Lion Capital of Ashoka.

The dharmachakra is a symbol in the śramaṇa religion of Buddha Dhamma.

Wheel symbolism was also used in Indian temples in places that underwent a religious transformation from Buddhism, such as Jagannath temple, whose deity is believed by some scholars to have a Buddhist origin. It also finds use in other ancient temples of Odisha, the most famous of which is the Konark Sun Temple.

The 24 spoke Ashoka dharmachakra is present in the modern flag of India, representing the pan-Indian concept of Dharma. The modern State Emblem of India is a depiction of the Lion Capital of Ashoka (Sanchi), which includes the dharmachakra. An integral part of the emblem is the motto inscribed in Devanagari script: Satyameva Jayate (English: Truth Alone Triumphs). This is a quote from the Mundaka Upanishad, the concluding part of the Vedas.

Sarvepalli Radhakrishnan, the first Vice President of India, stated that the Ashoka Chakra of India represents the "wheel of the law of dharma", as well as "Truth or satya", "Virtue" as well as "motion", as in the "dynamism of a peaceful change".

=== Other uses and similar symbols ===
- The main attribute of Vishnu is a wheel like weapon called the Sudarśanacakra.
- Similar wheel symbols were used as a solar symbol by the Ancient Egyptians.
- Some Buddha statues also depict the related Dharmachakra Mudrā, a hand sign depicting the turning of the Dharma wheel.
- A very similar wheel symbol also appears in the flag of the Romani people, hinting to their nomadic history.
- In non-Buddhist cultural contexts, an eight-spoked wheel resembles a traditional ship's wheel. As a nautical emblem, this image is a common sailor tattoo, which may be misidentified as a dharmachakra or vice versa.
- The sonnenrad is a similar symbol used by occultists and neo-nazis.
- Falun Gong uses the concept of a similar wheel as a central concept.
- In the Unicode computer standard, the dharmachakra is called the "Wheel of Dharma" and found in the eight-spoked form. It is represented as U+2638 (☸). As emoji: ☸️.

== Gallery ==
=== Historical and archeological examples ===
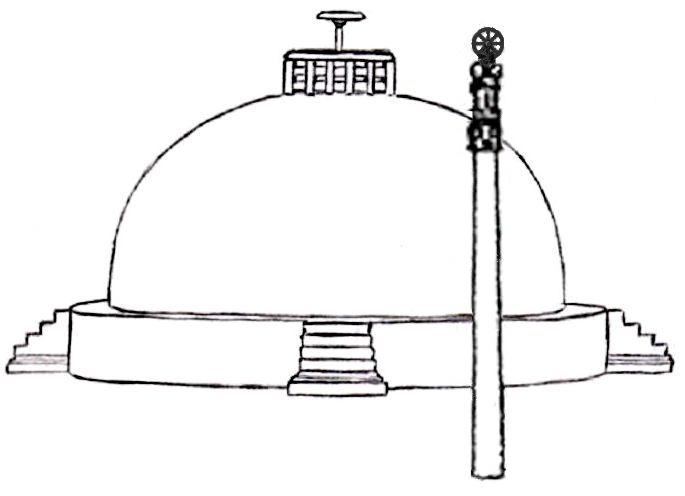
Reconstitution of approximate layout of Sanchi at the time of the Mauryas, showing the pillar topped by a dharmachakra.

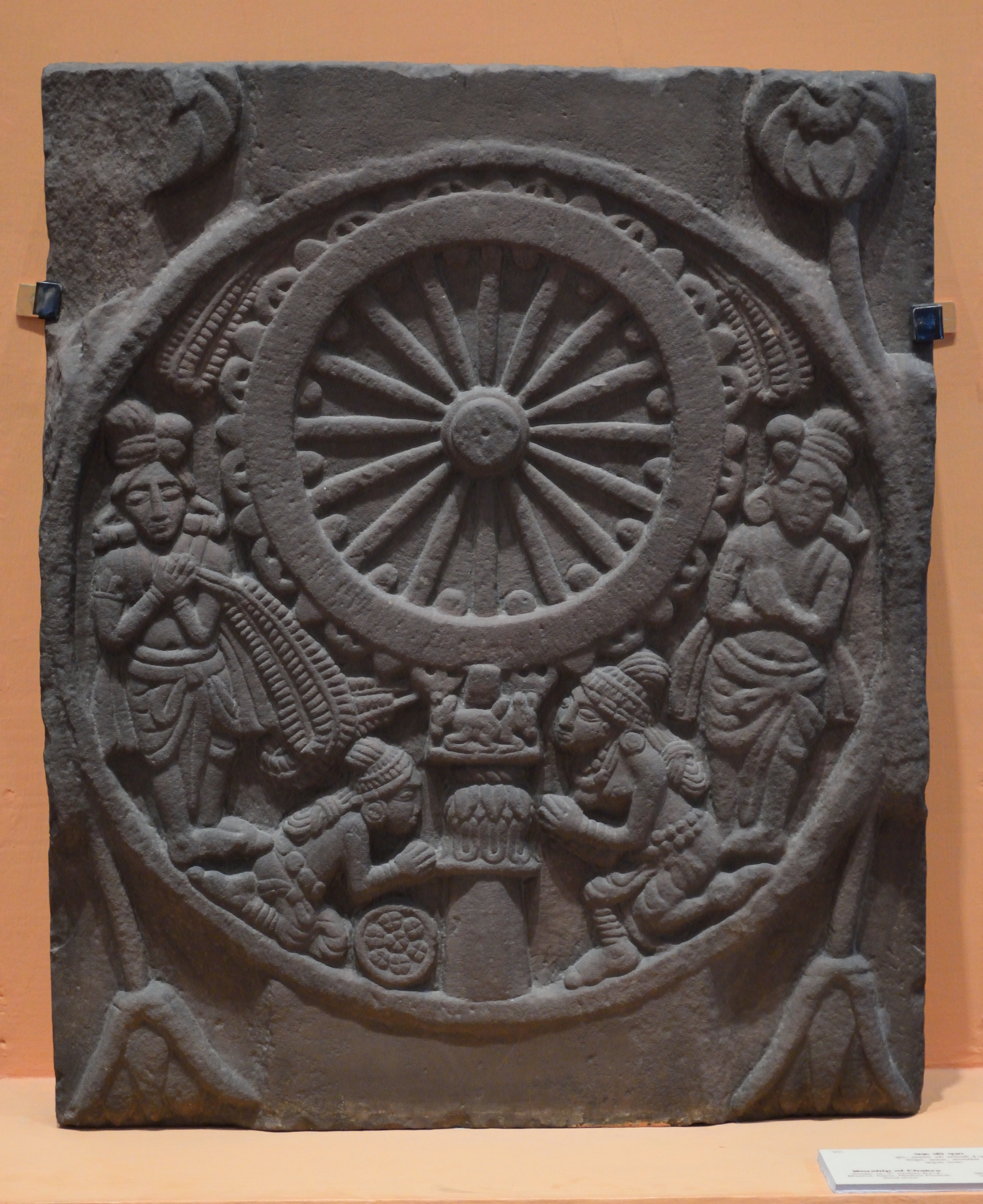
Sandstone depiction, c. 2nd Century BCE, Bharhut, Indian Museum – Kolkata.

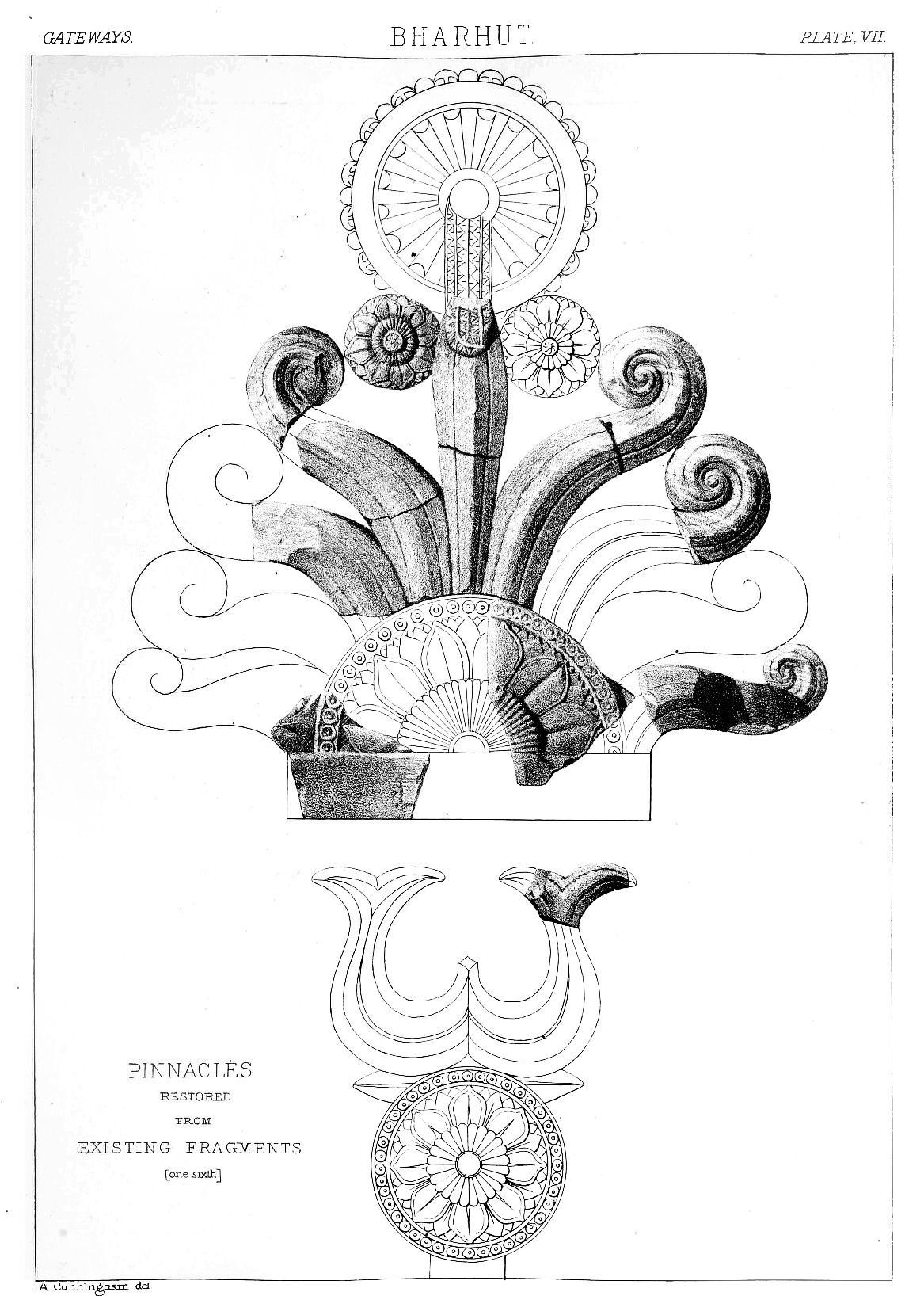
Illustrated reconstruction of the pinnacles at Bharhut by Alexander Cunningham

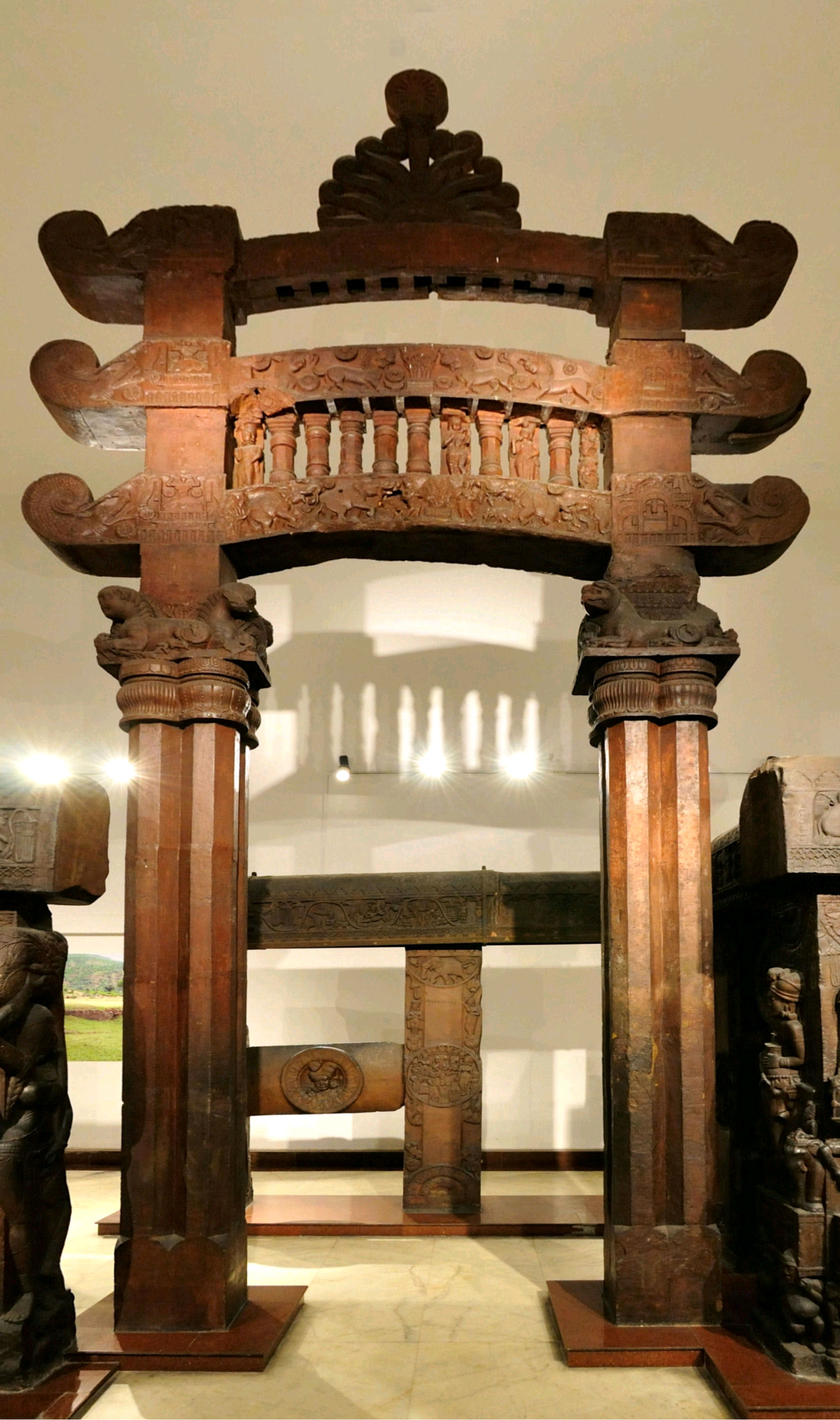
Eastern gateway of Bharhut stupa topped with a dharmachakra pinnacle

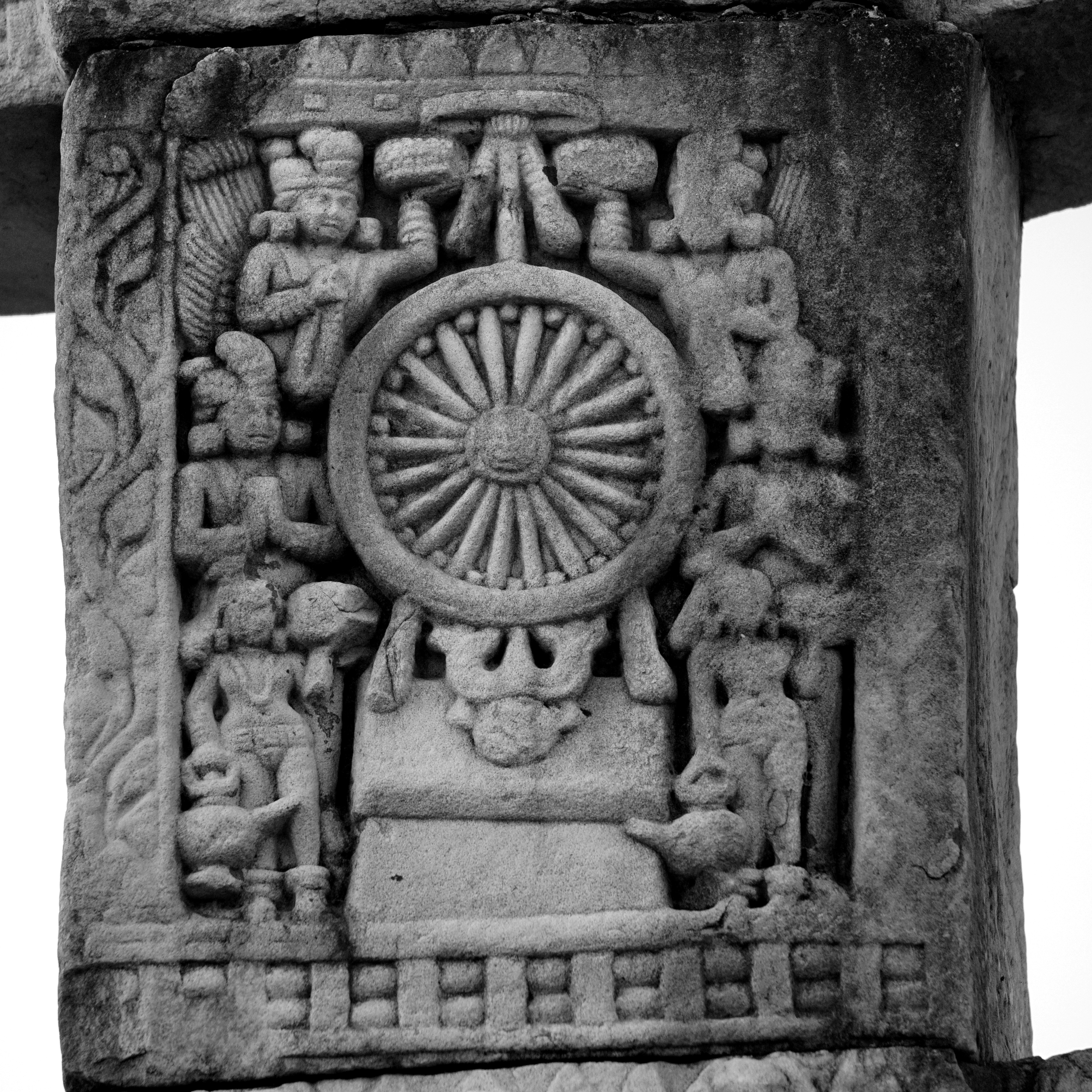
Buddha represented by Dharmacakra, Sanchi Stupa no. 3.

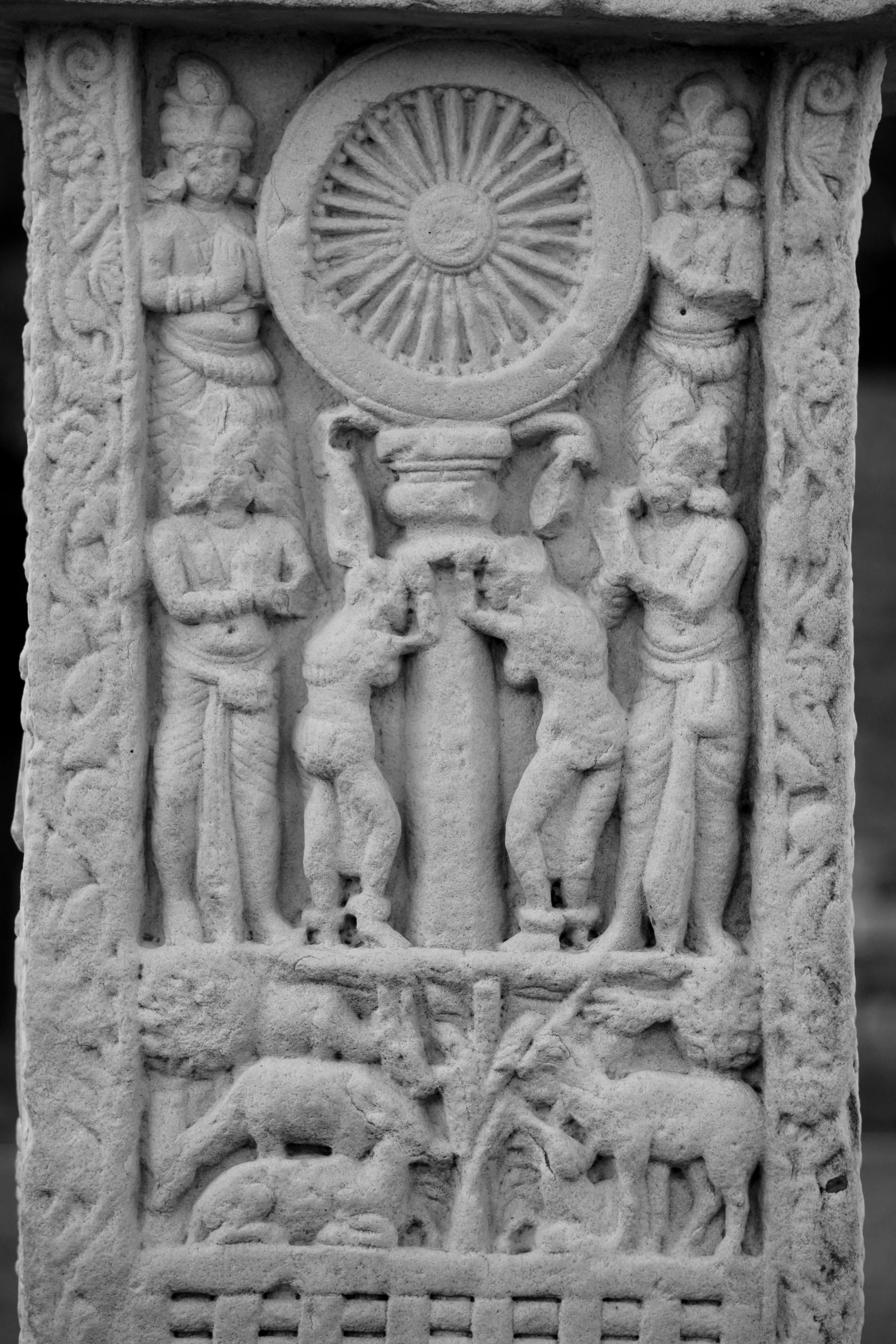
Dharmacakra on Pillar, Sanchi Stupa no. 3

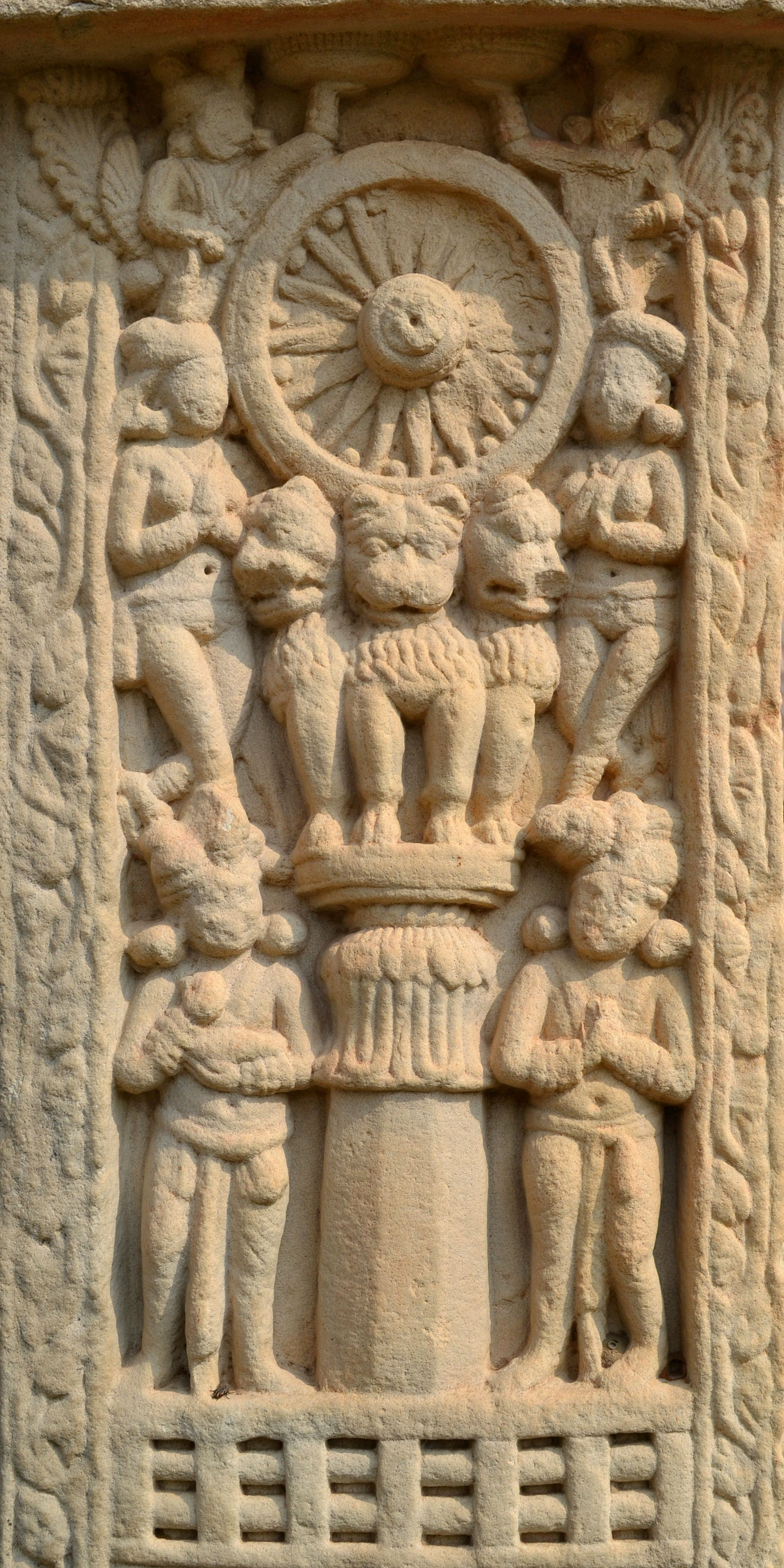
Adoration of the pillar of Ashoka, Sanchi Stupa no. 3.

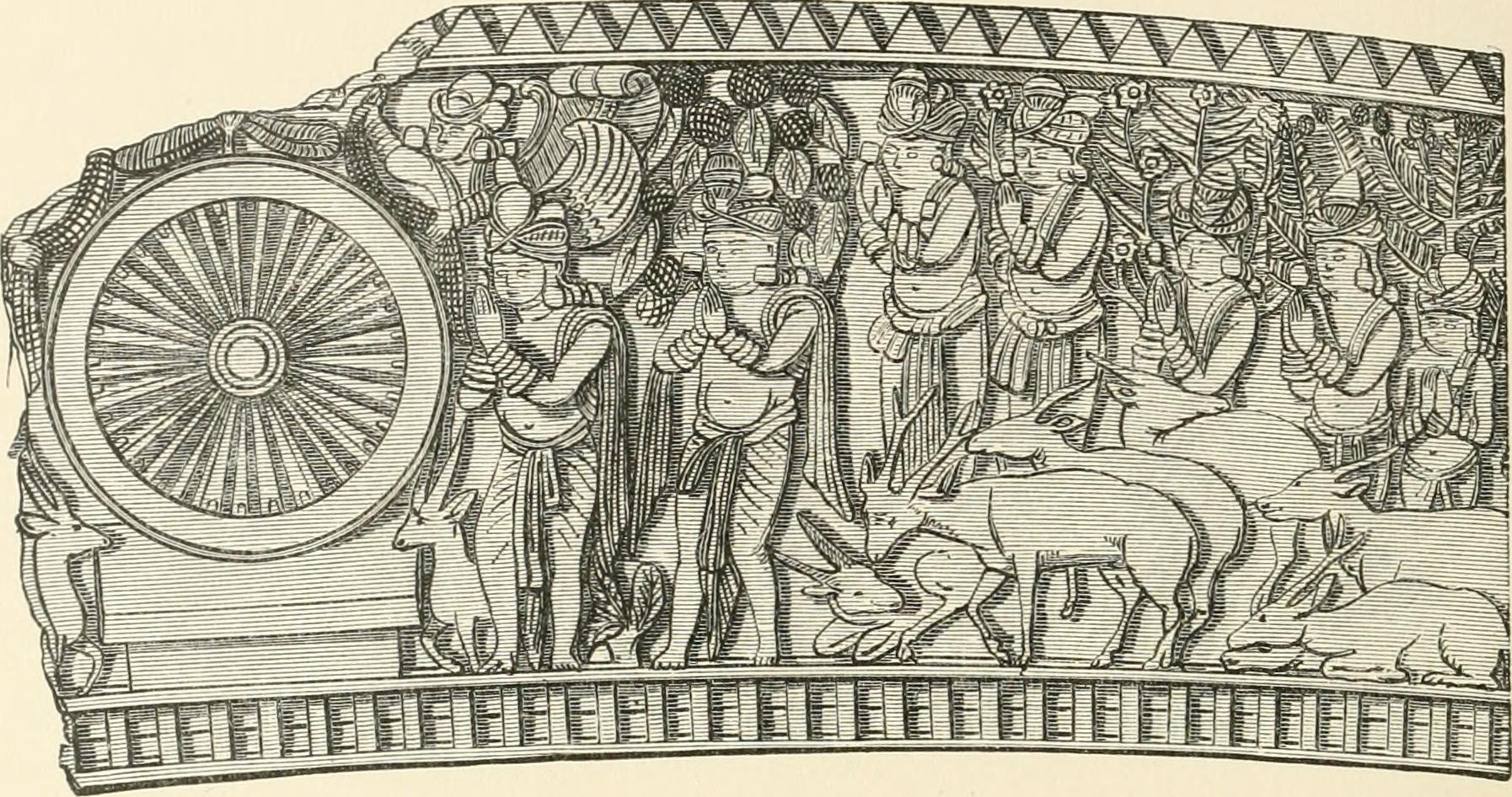
Illustration from Sanchi Stupa

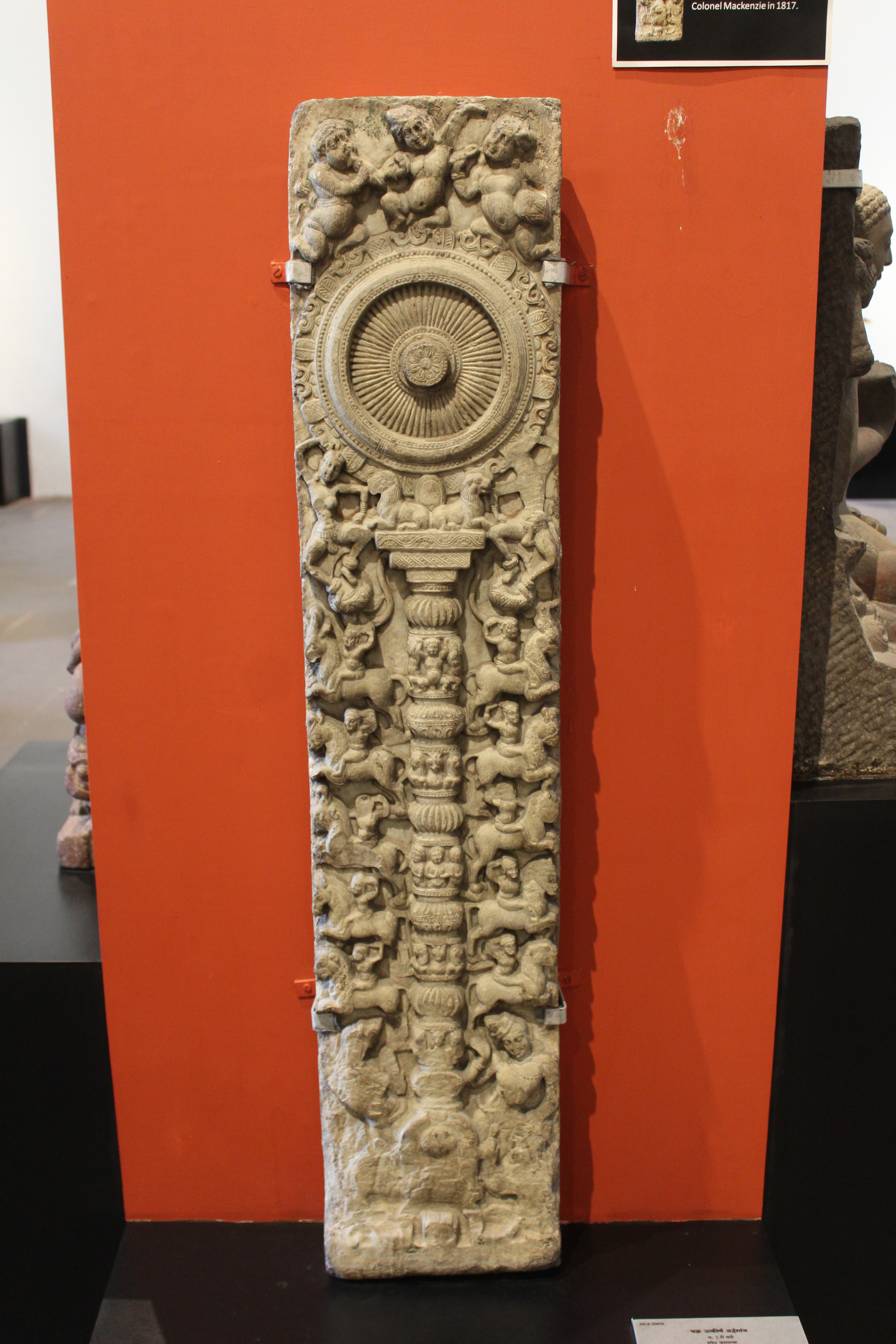
Limestone Pilaster, 2nd century CE, Amaravathi, Indian Museum, Kolkata.

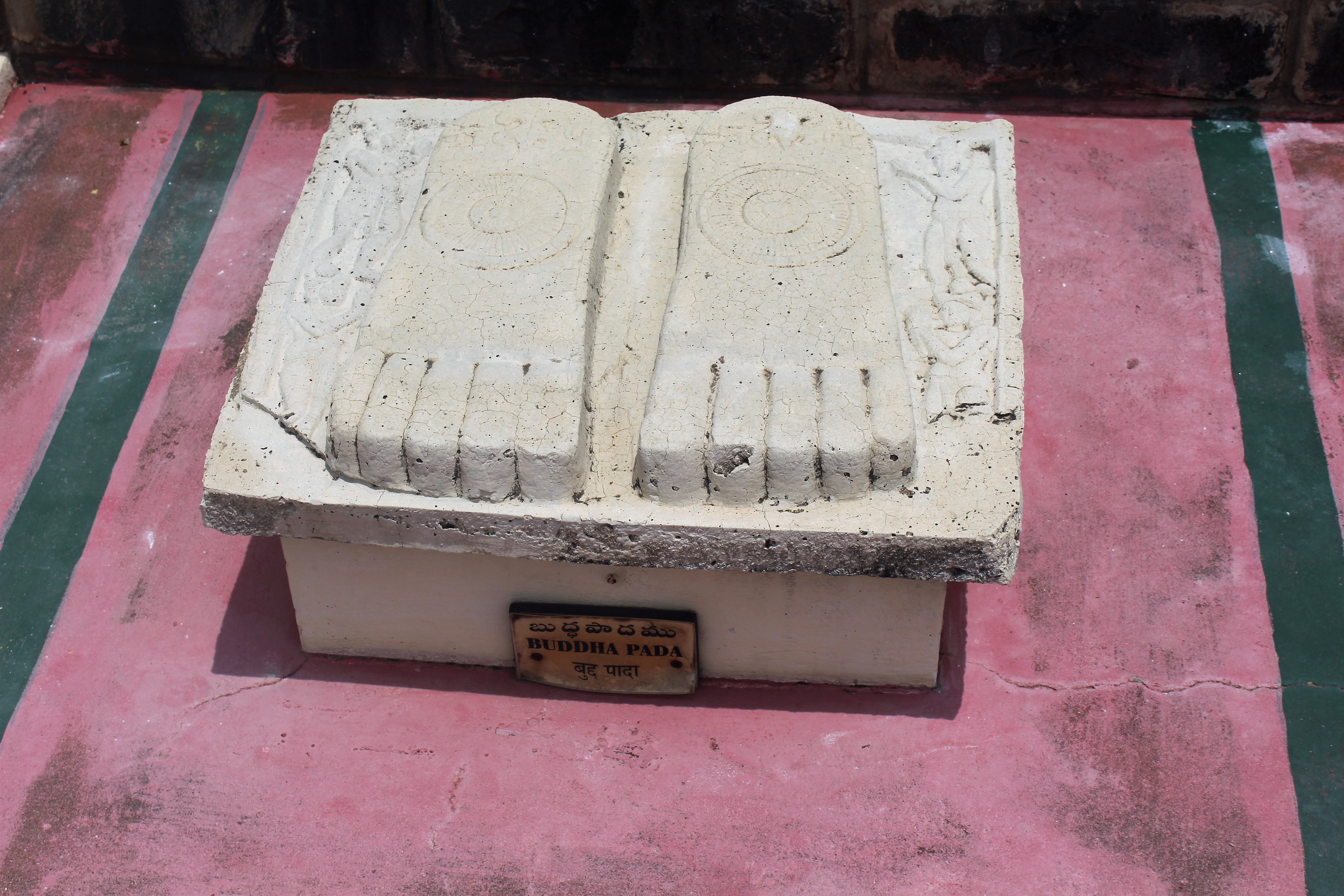
Buddha footprints with dharmachakras, Archaeological Museum, Amaravati

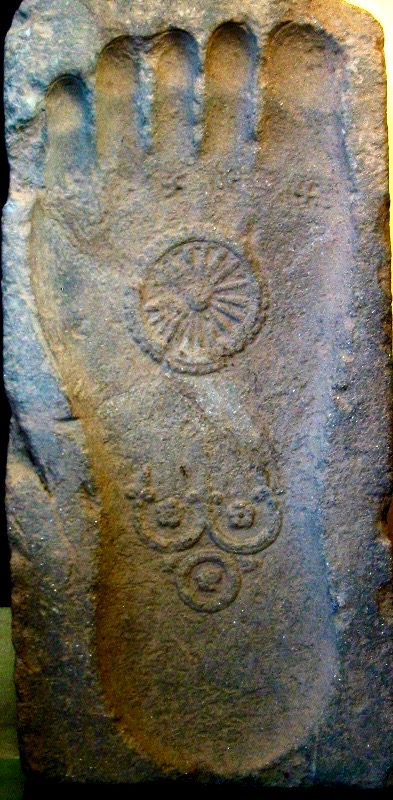
1st century Gandhara Buddha footprint

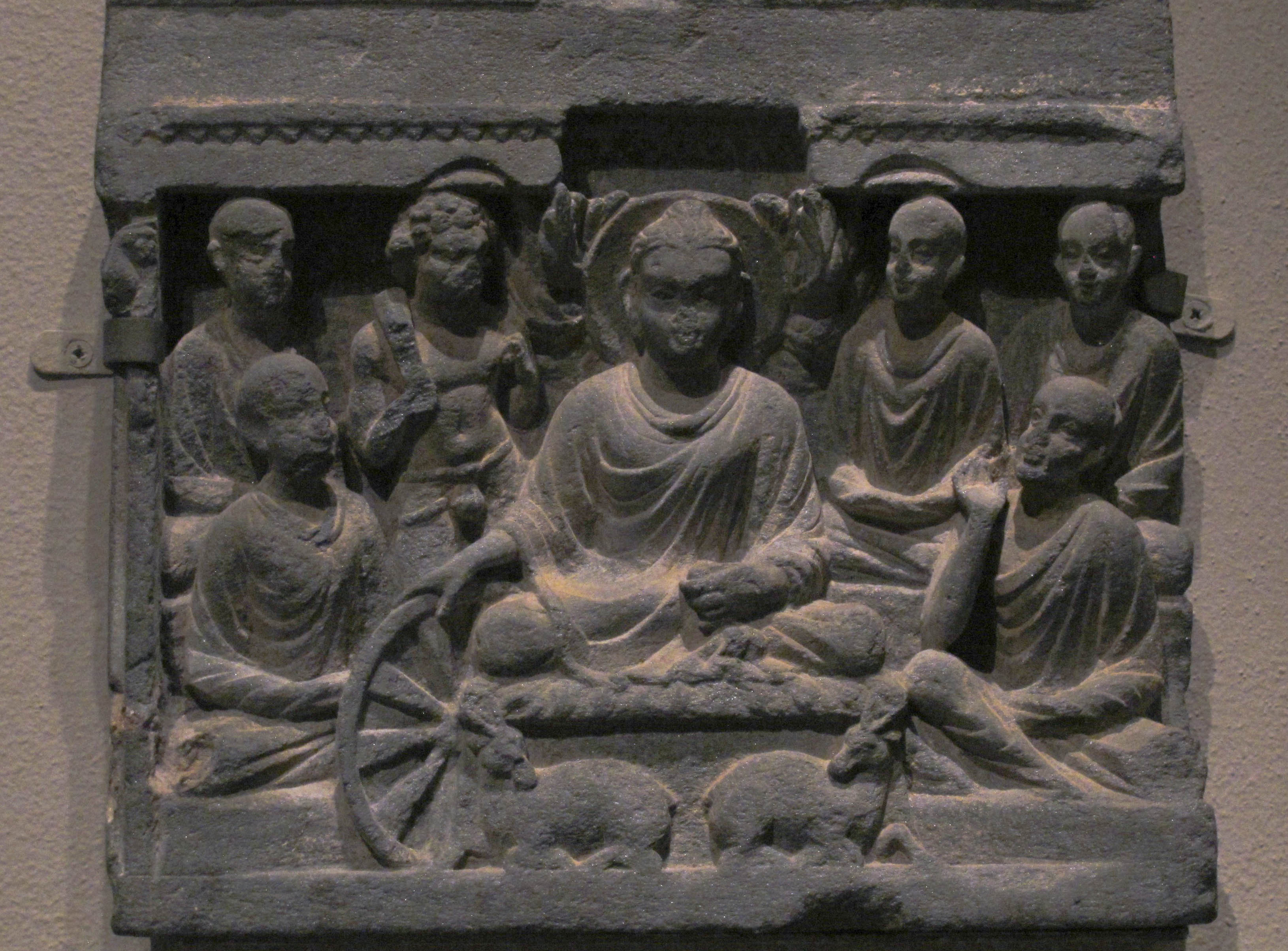
Gandharan Stele illustrating the first sermon at Sarnath, 2nd century, Metropolitan Museum of Art.

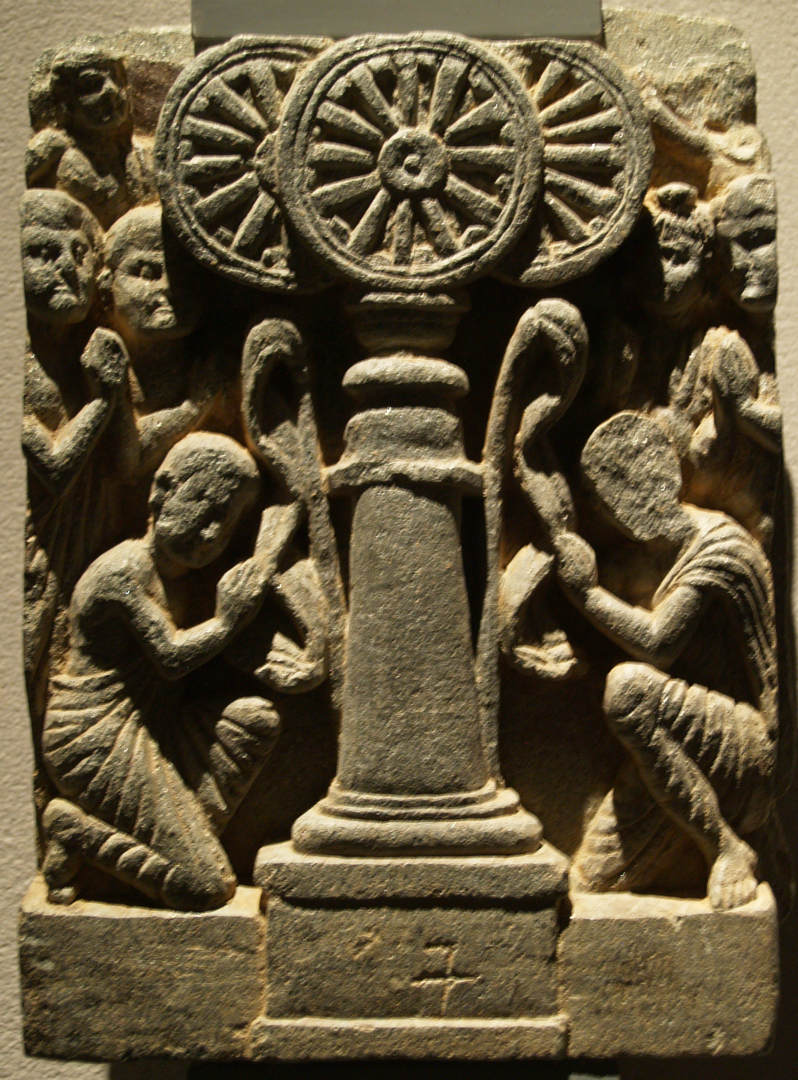
Stele from Gandhara

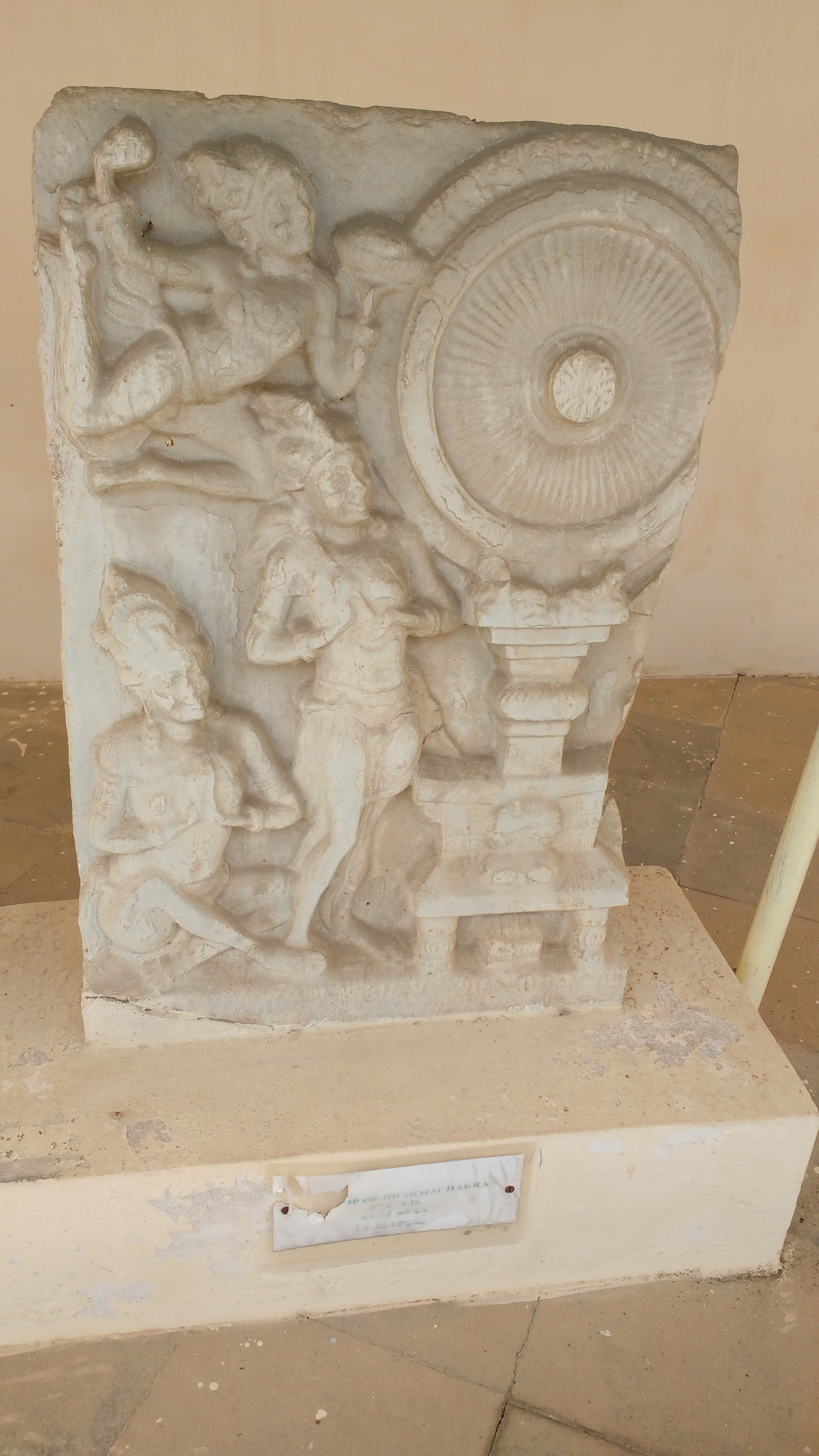
A sculpture depicting the Dharmachakra in the museum of Amaravathi

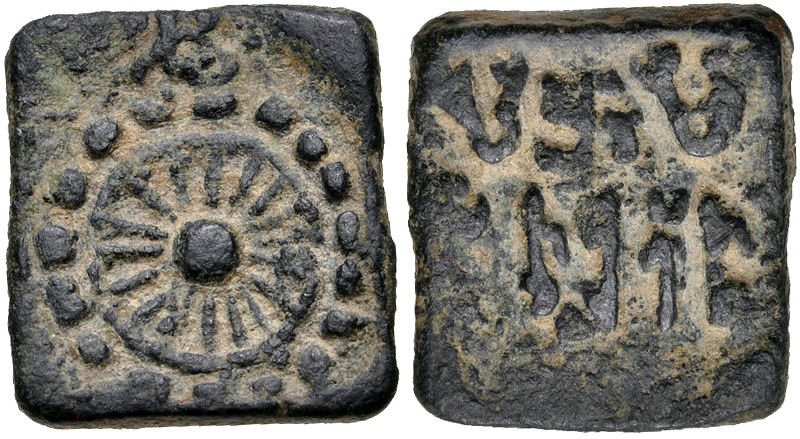
Taxila coin with wheel and Buddhist symbols

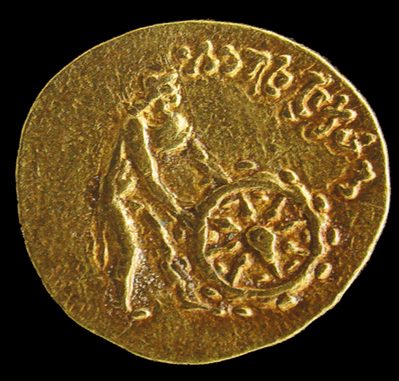
Coin found in Afghanistan, 50 BCE – c. 30 CE, at the latest before 50 CE.

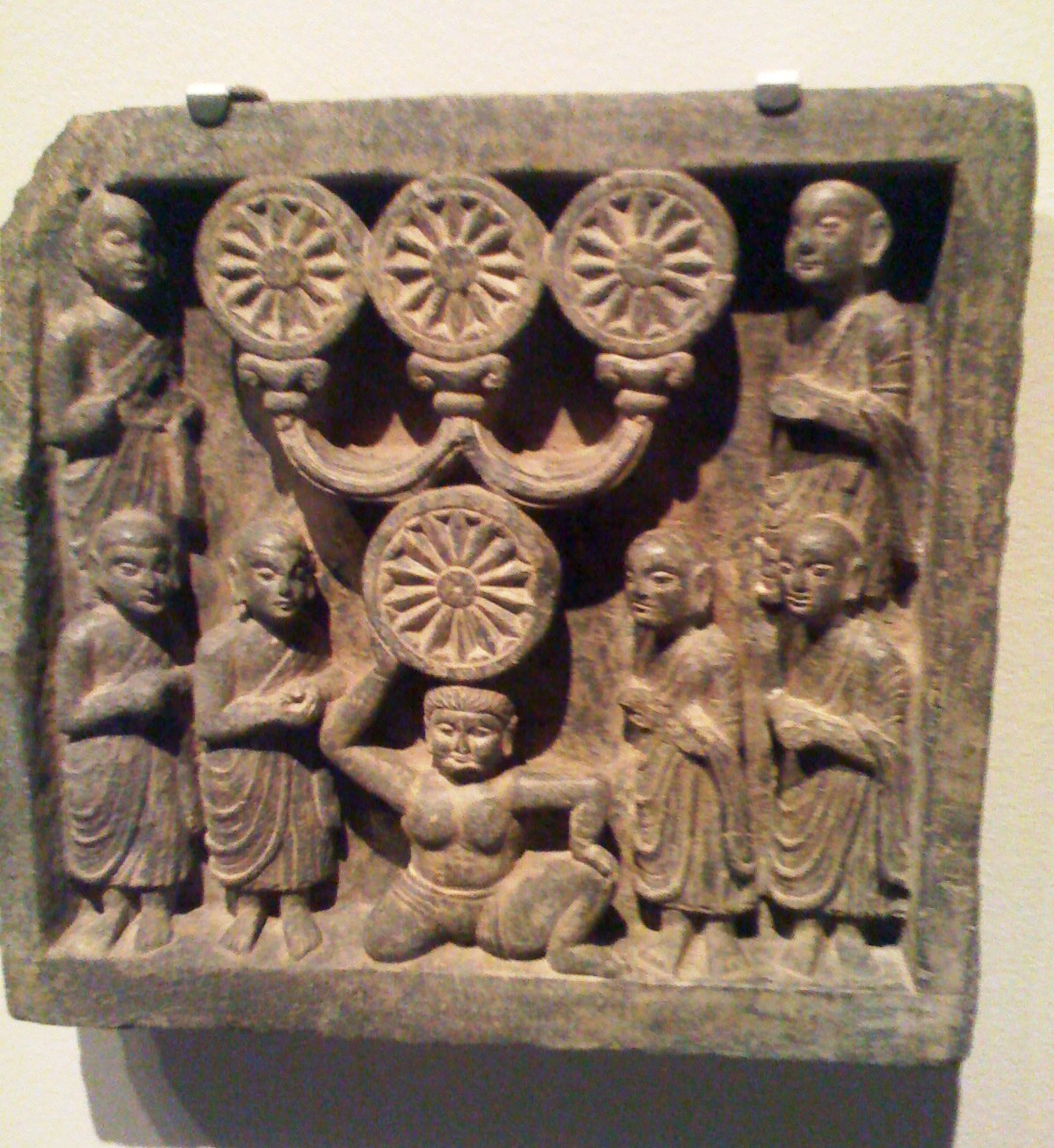
Three Jewels, or Triratna. Eastern Afghanistan. Kushan period. 2–3 century.

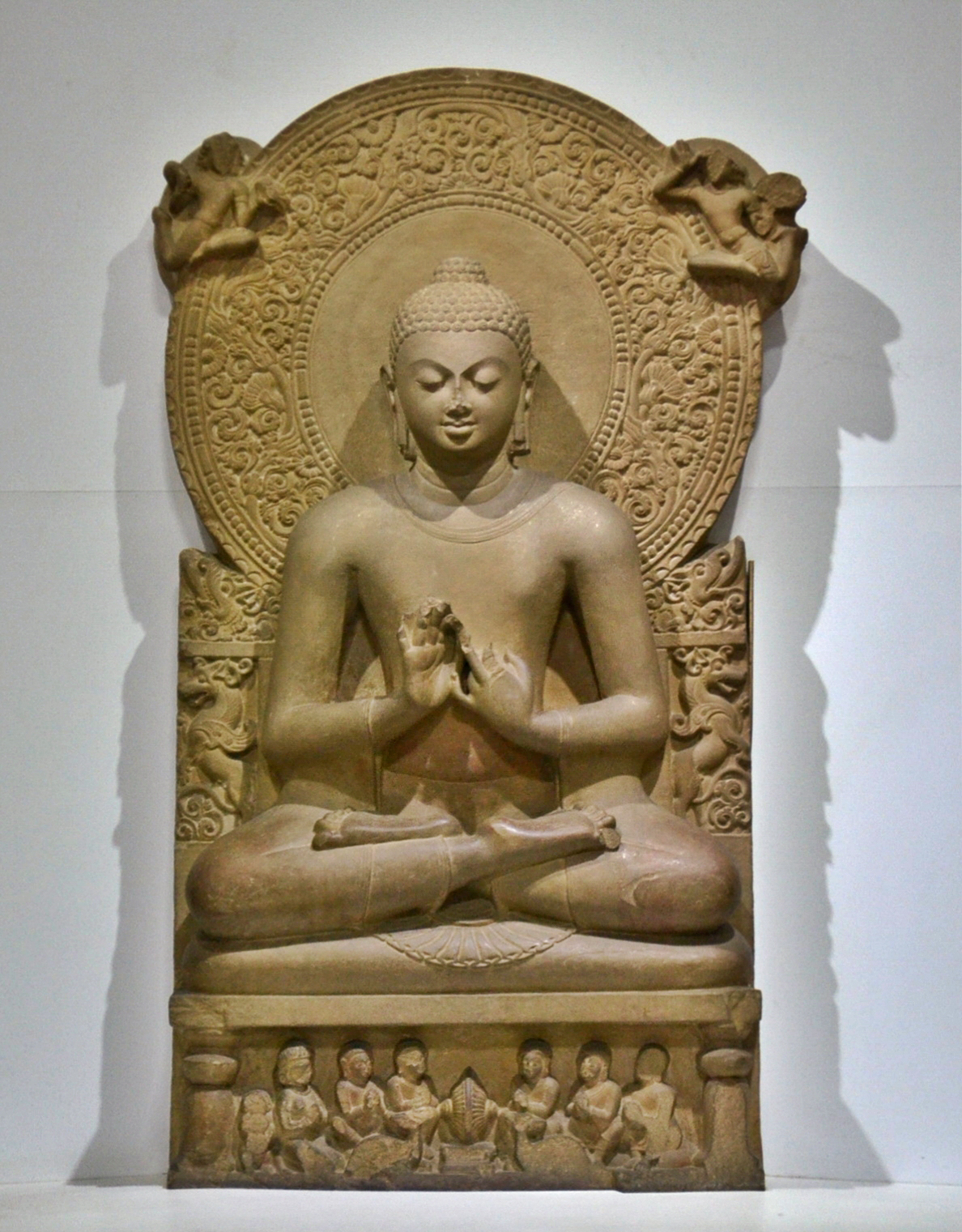
Dharmachakra Pravartana Mudra, Gupta period, 5th CE.

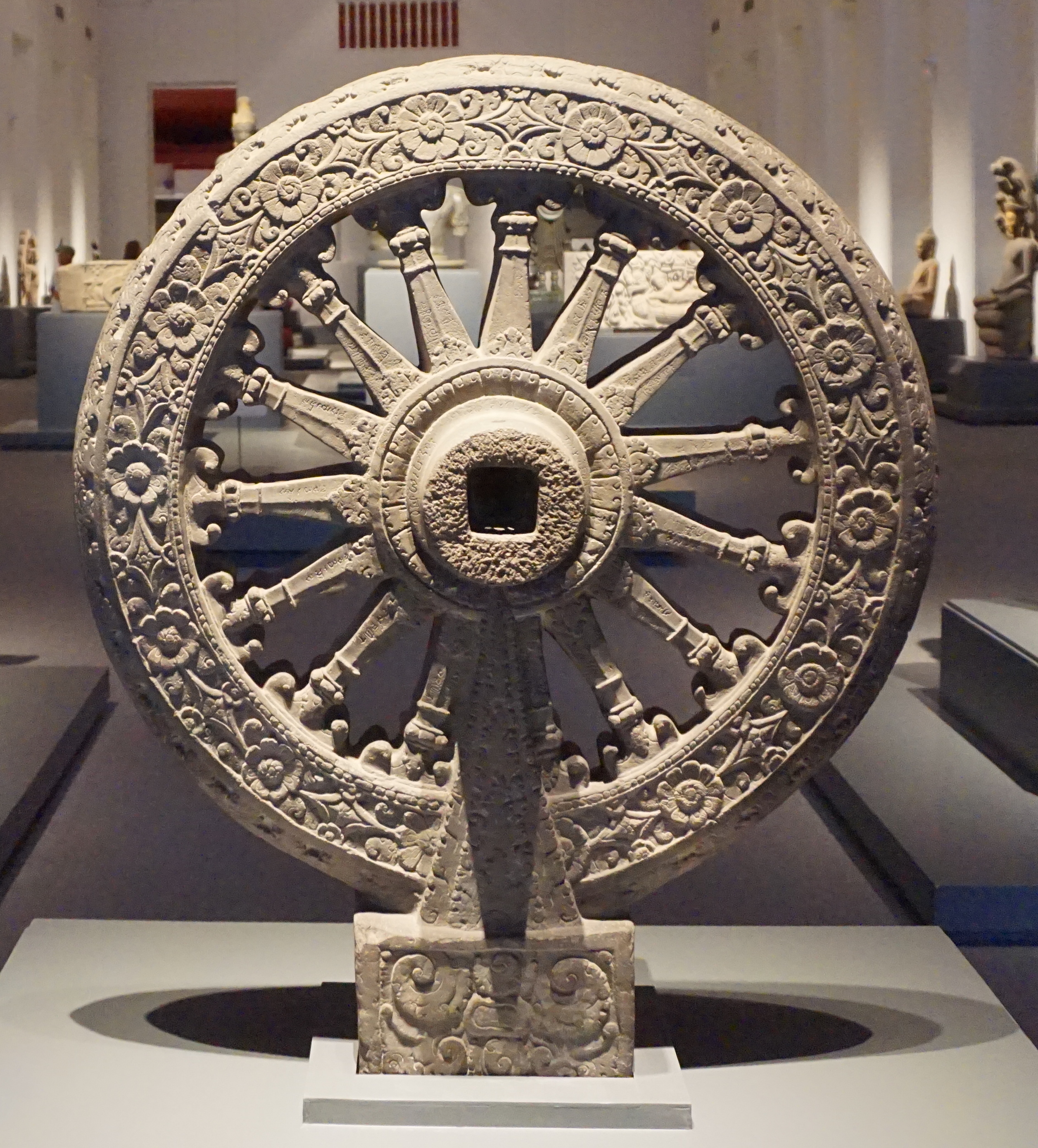
Dhammacakka, National Museum, Bangkok, Thailand.

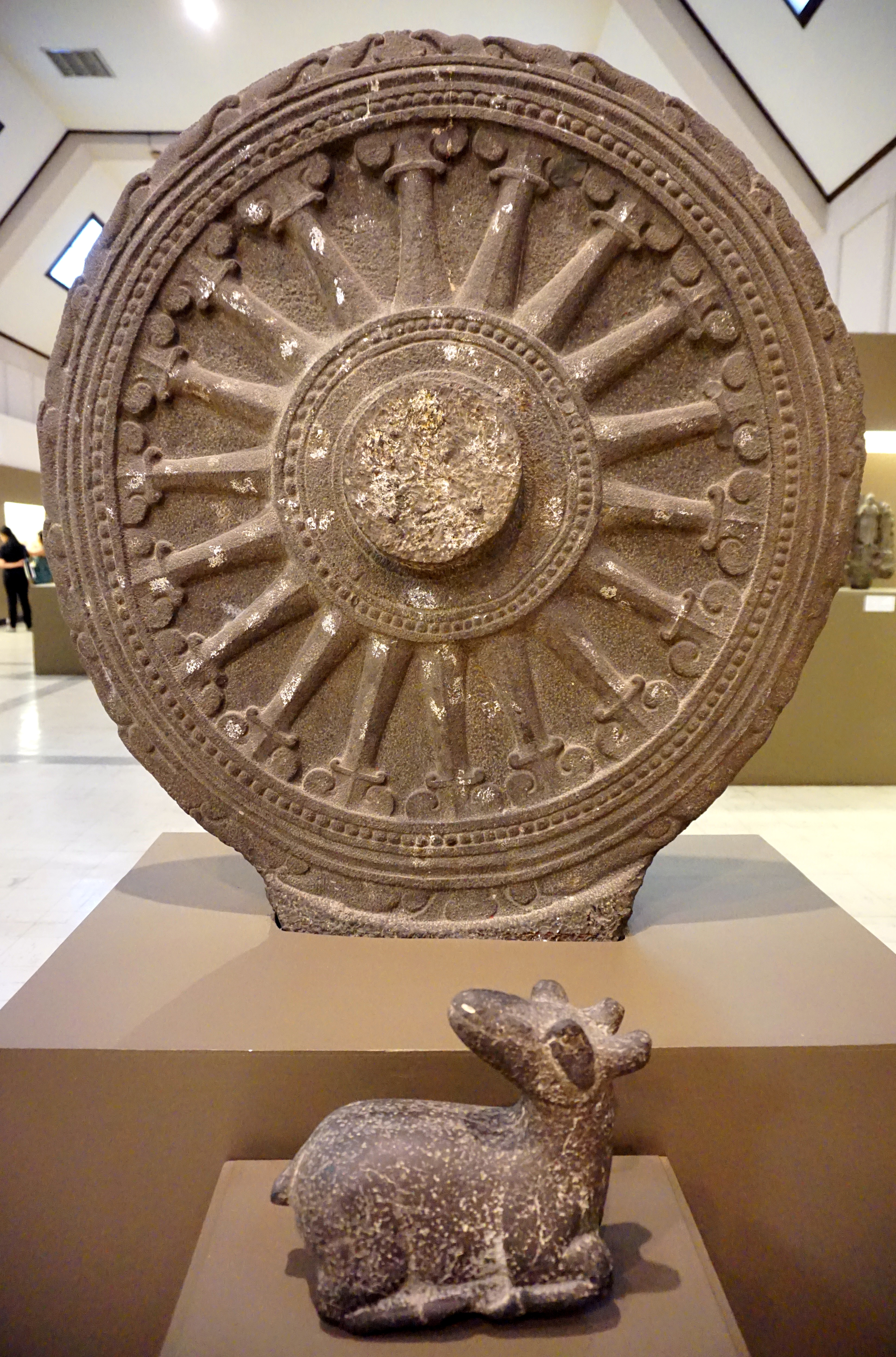
Dhammacakka, National Museum, Bangkok, Thailand.

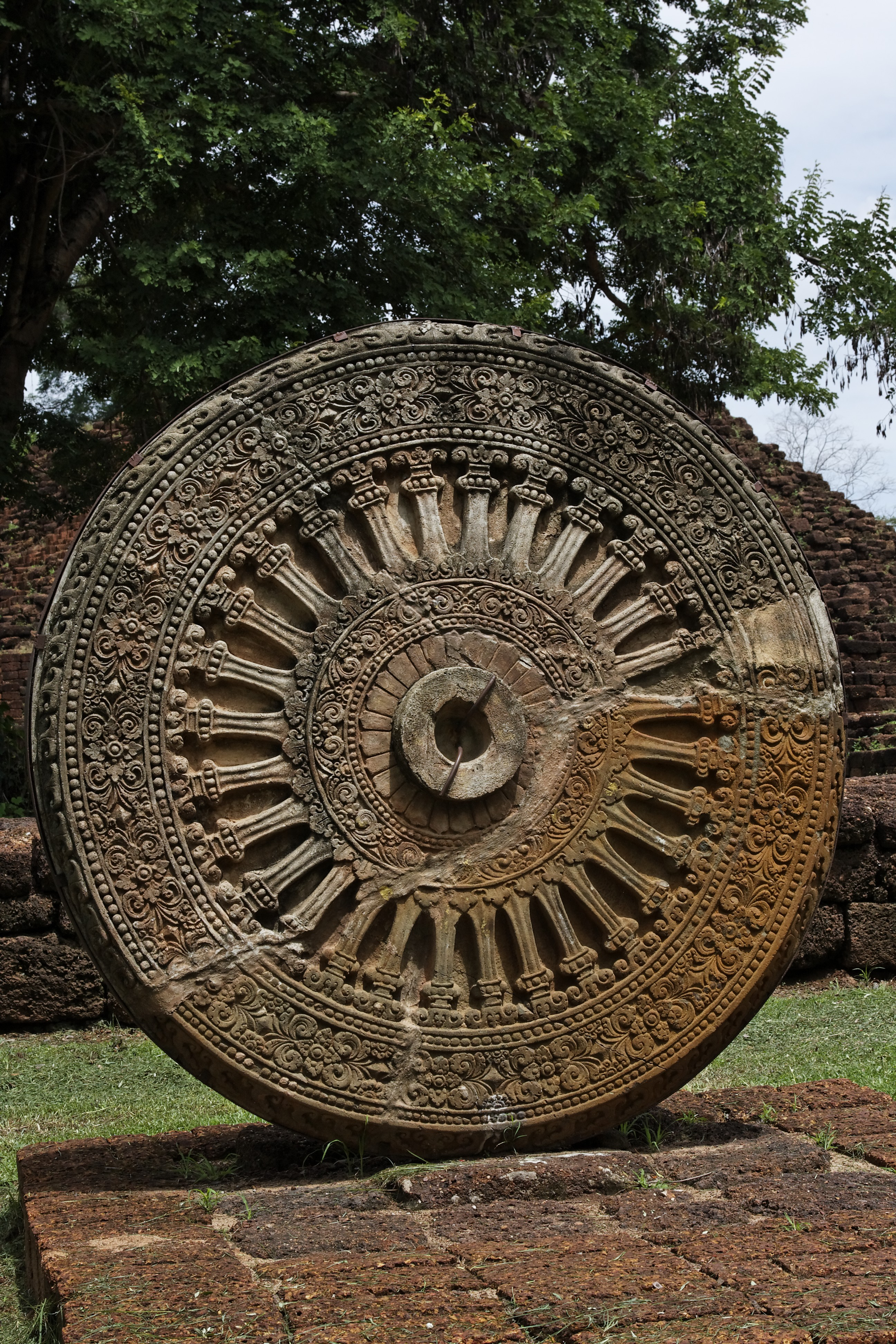
Khao Klang Nai, Si Thep Historical Park, Thailand.

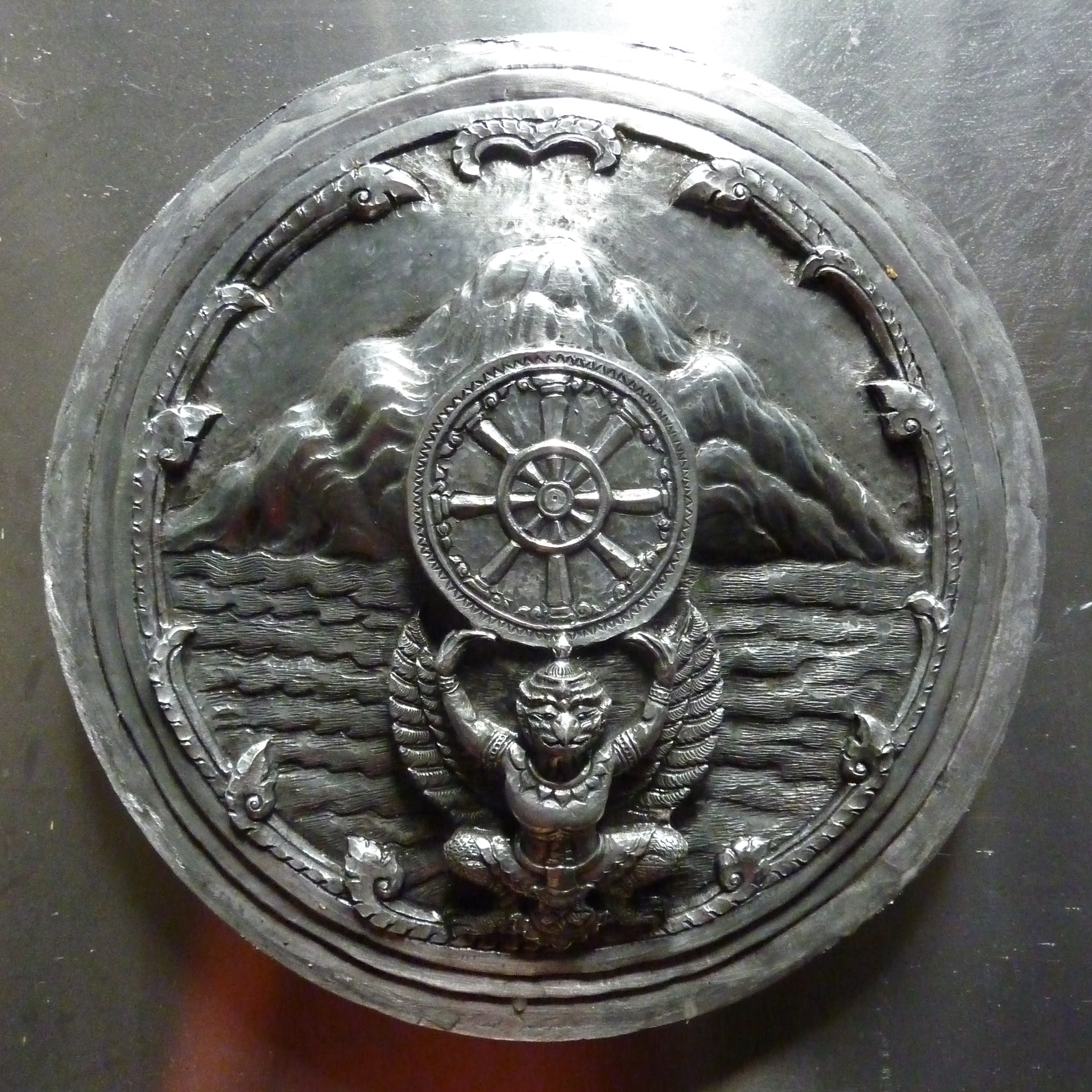
Seal of Chai Nat Province (a garuda upholding the dhammacakka in front of the mountain and river), Wat Sri Suphan, Chiang Mai, Thailand.

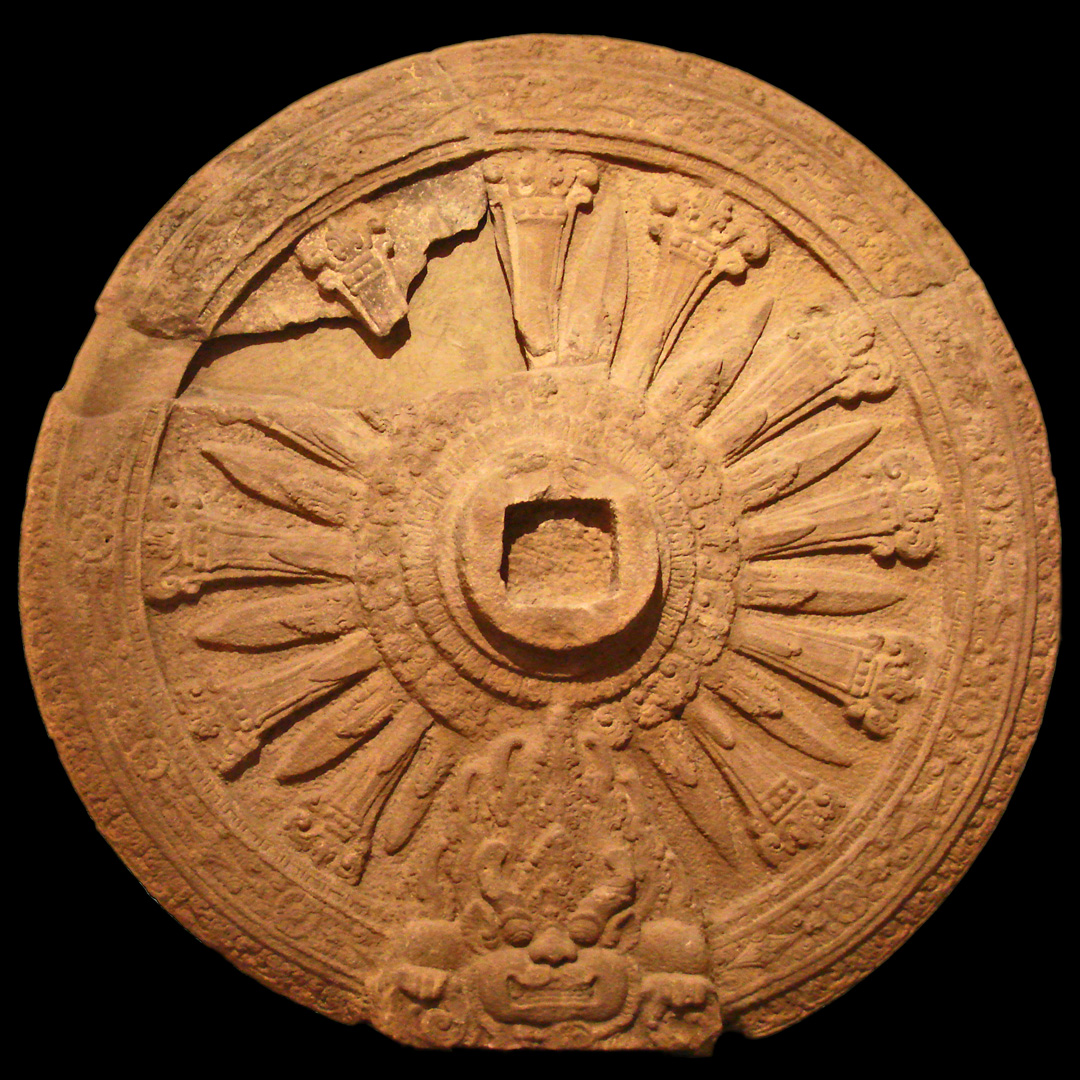
Mon dharmachakra, VII or IX century, Sandstone

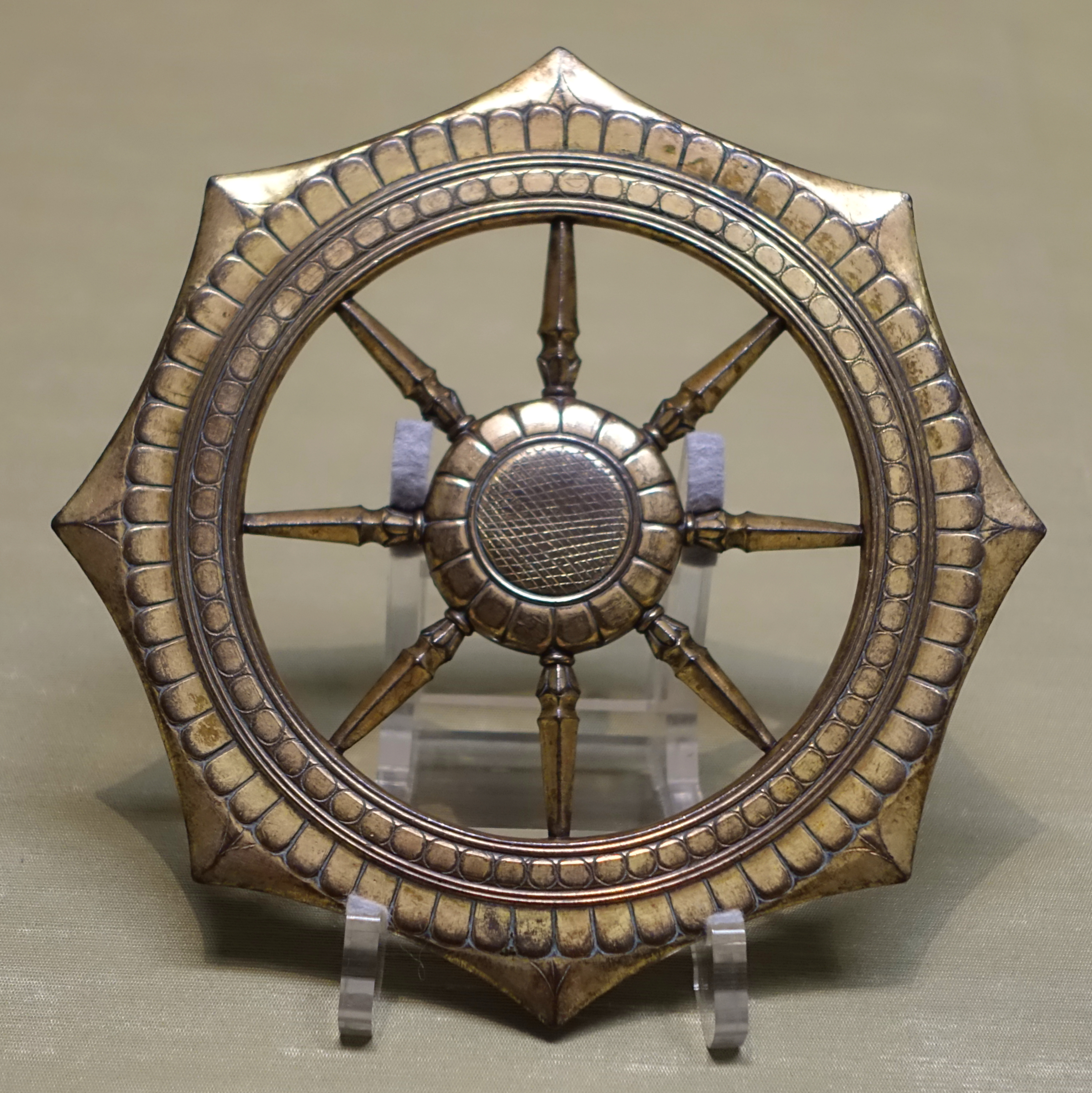
Dharma wheel, Japan, Kamakura period, 1200s CE, bronze – Tokyo National Museum.

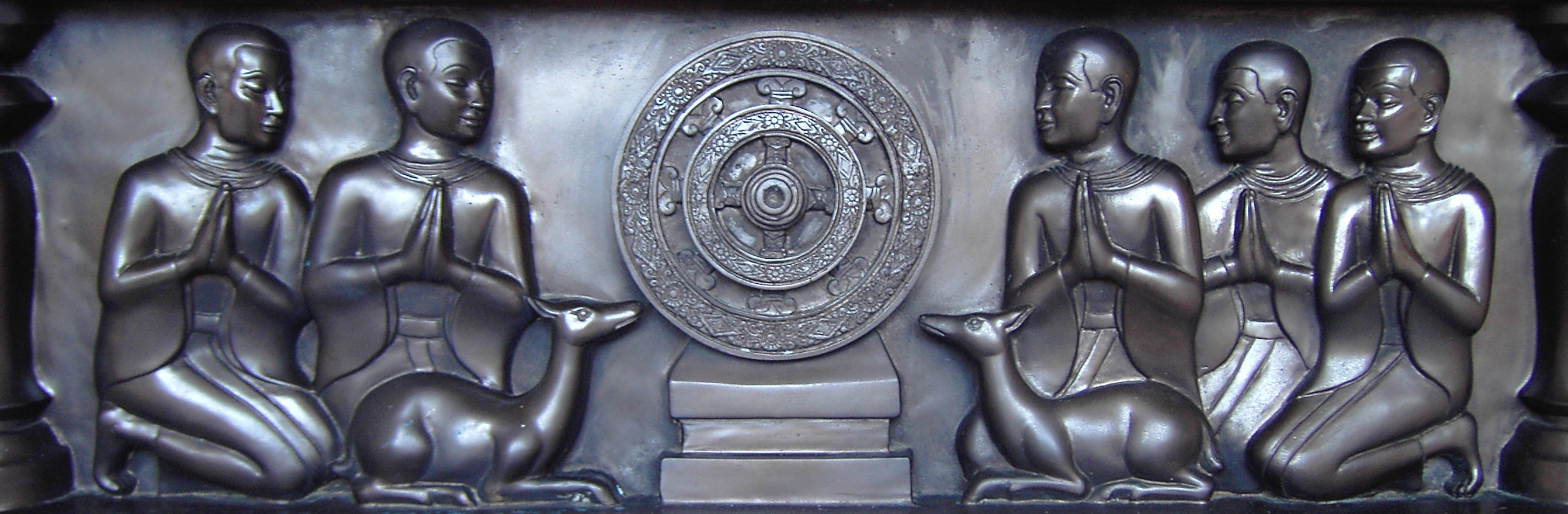
Part of a Buddha-statue, showing the first five disciples of the Buddha at Sarnath and dharmachakra.

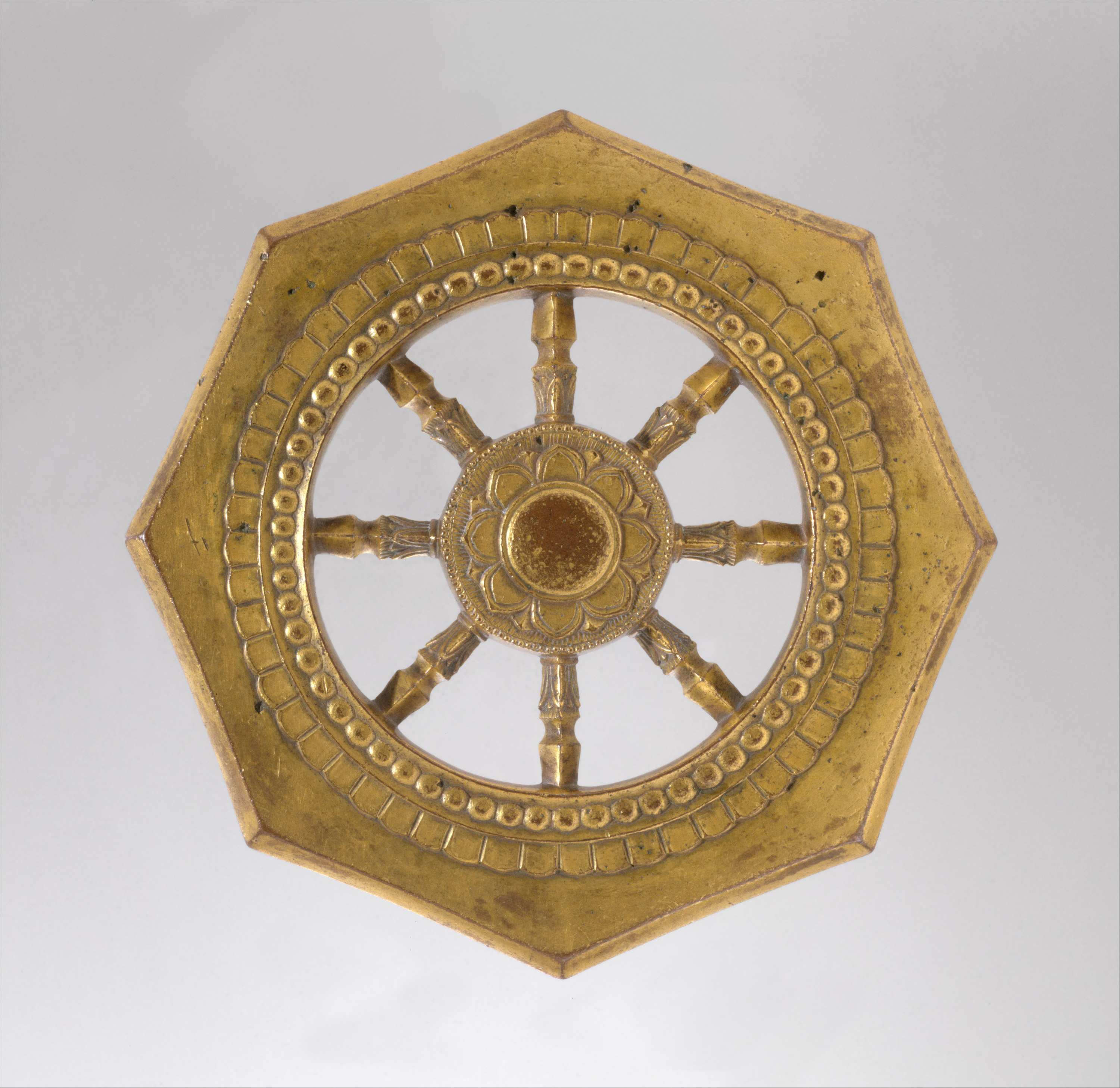
Japanese dharmachakra, late 13th century.

Mandala Base, China, Ming dynasty, Cleveland Museum of Art.

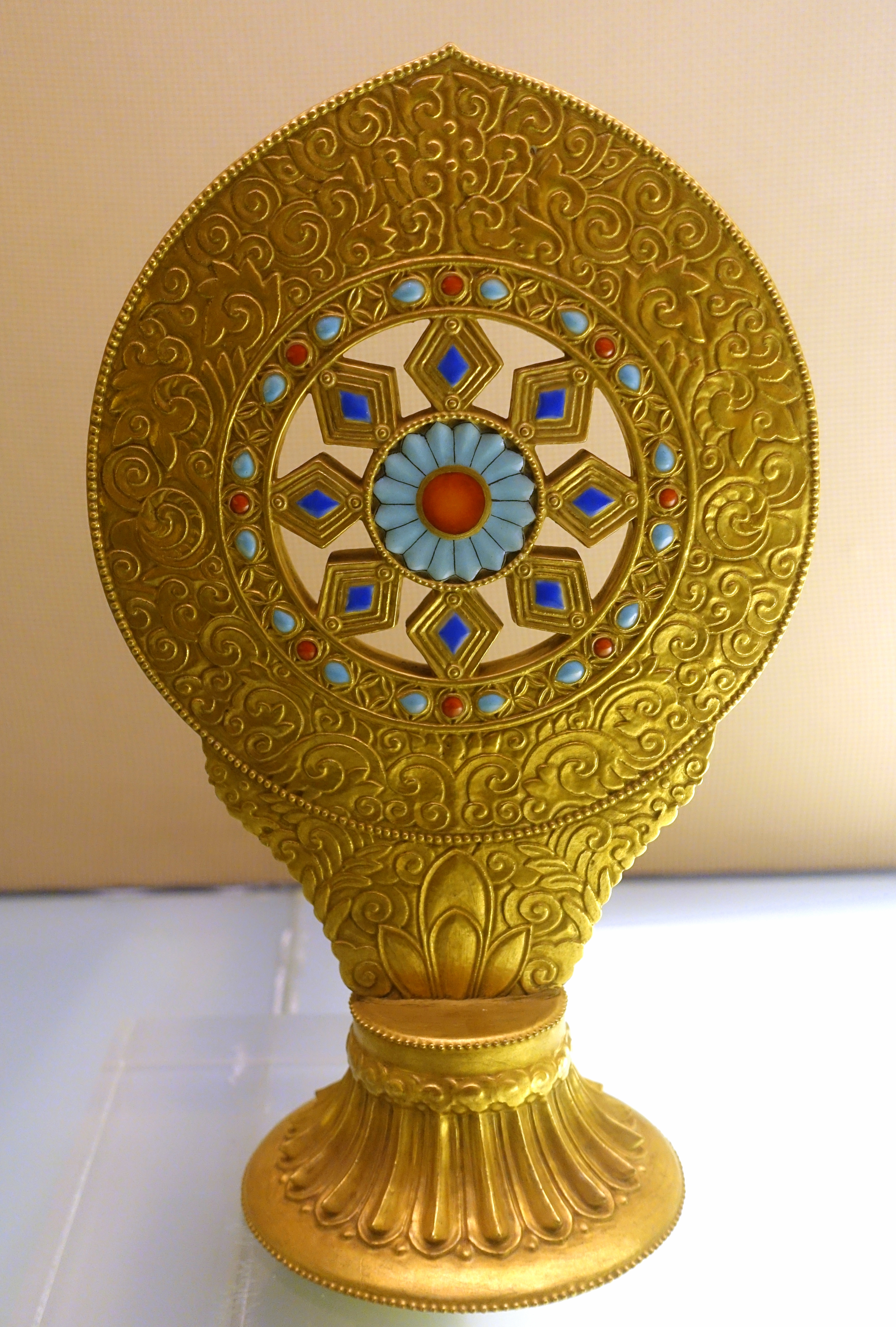
Dharma wheel, China, Qing dynasty, Qianlong period, 1736–1795 CE.

Box with Ink Cakes: Yellow Ink Stick, China, Qing dynasty (1644–1912).

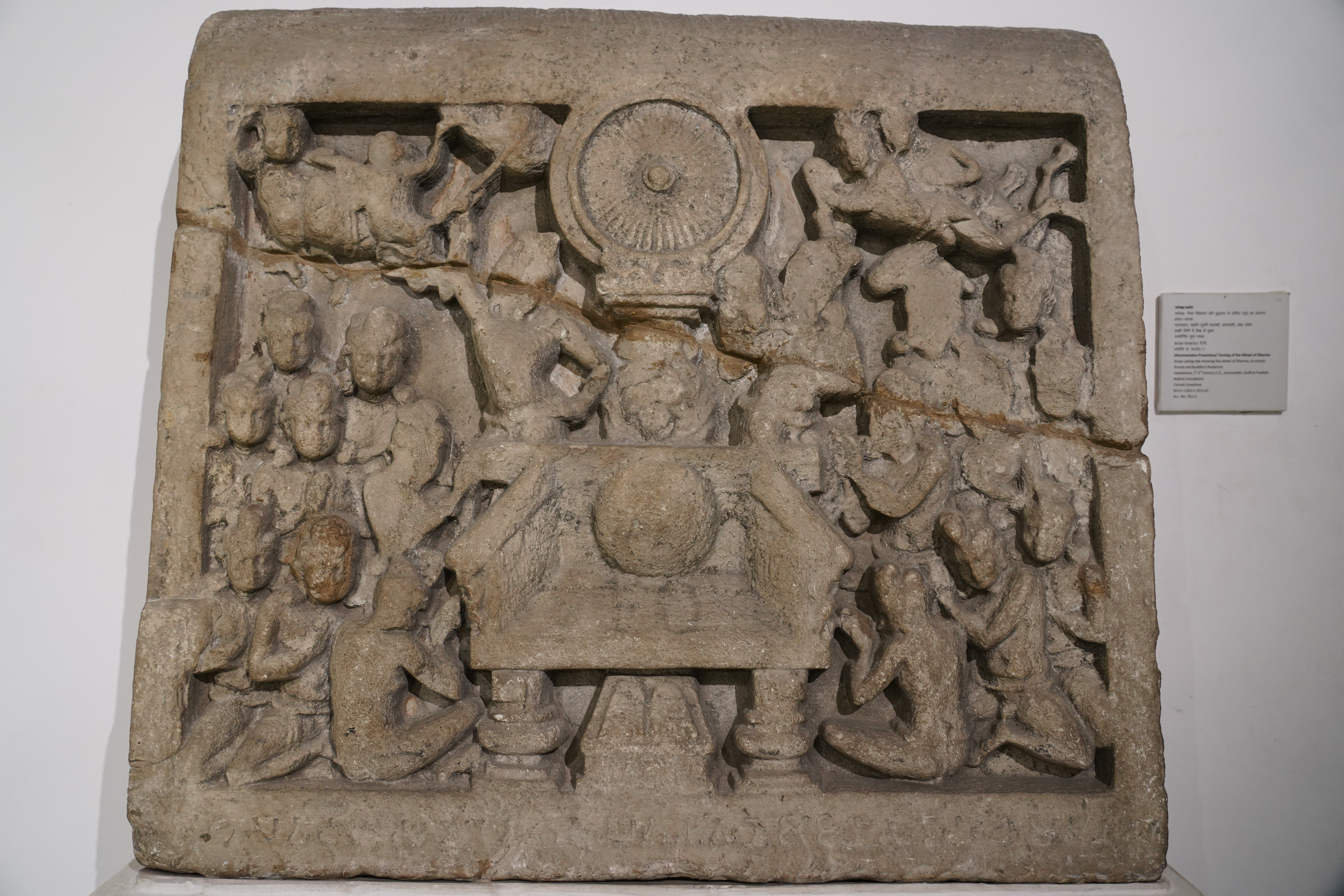
Dharmachakra Pravartana at National Museum, New Delhi

=== Contemporary examples ===
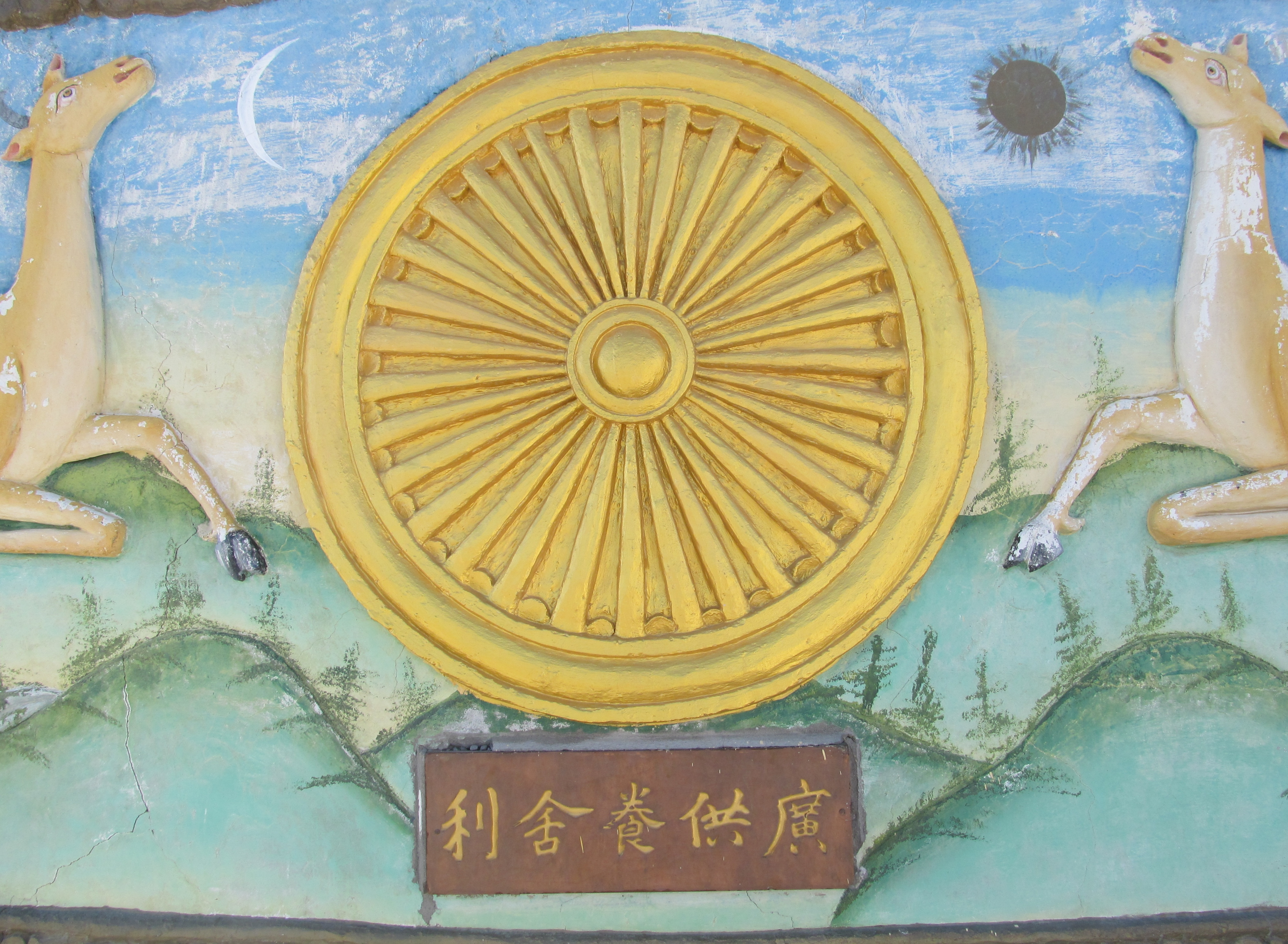
Shanti Stupa, Leh

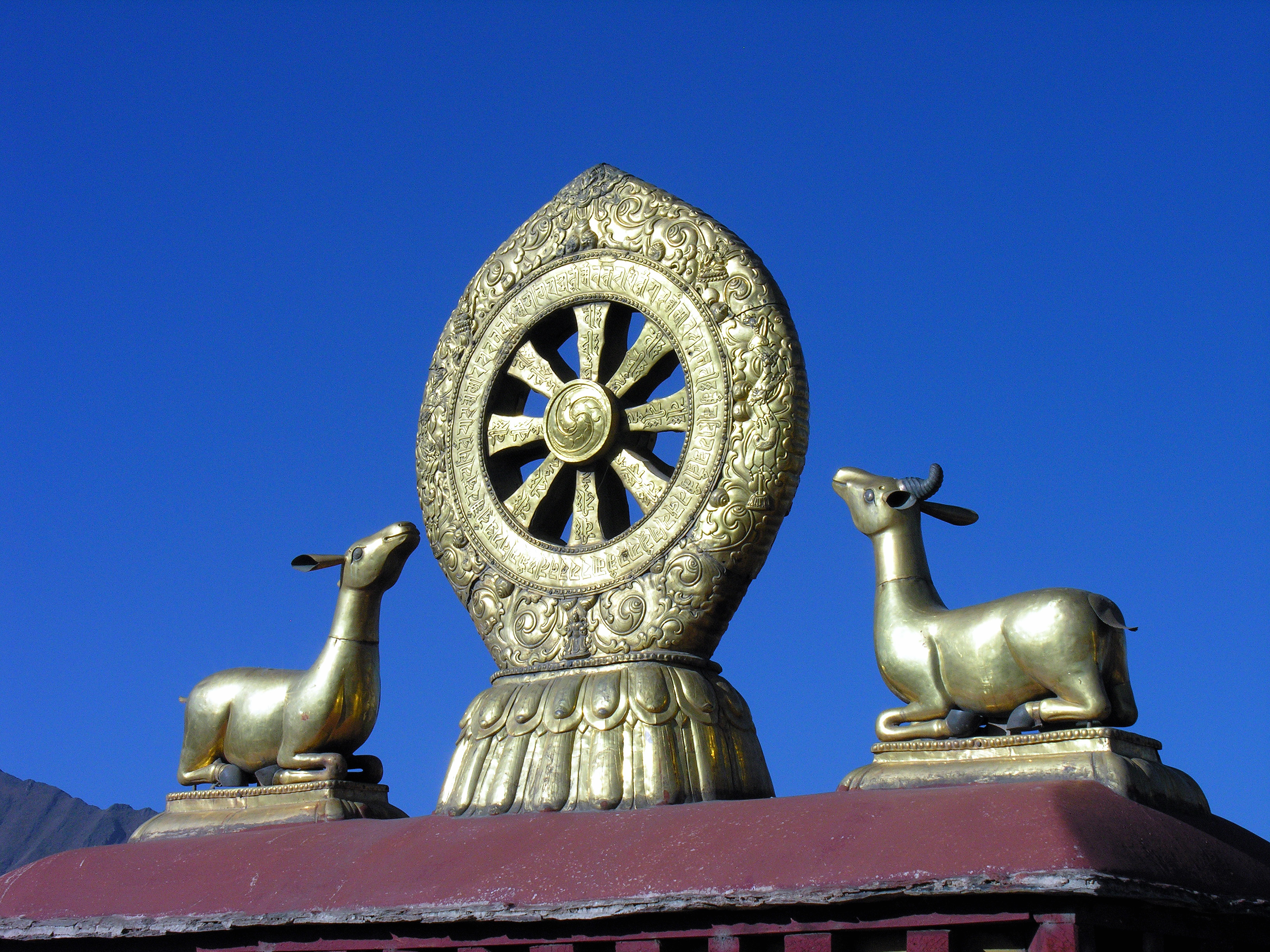
Jokhang Monastery

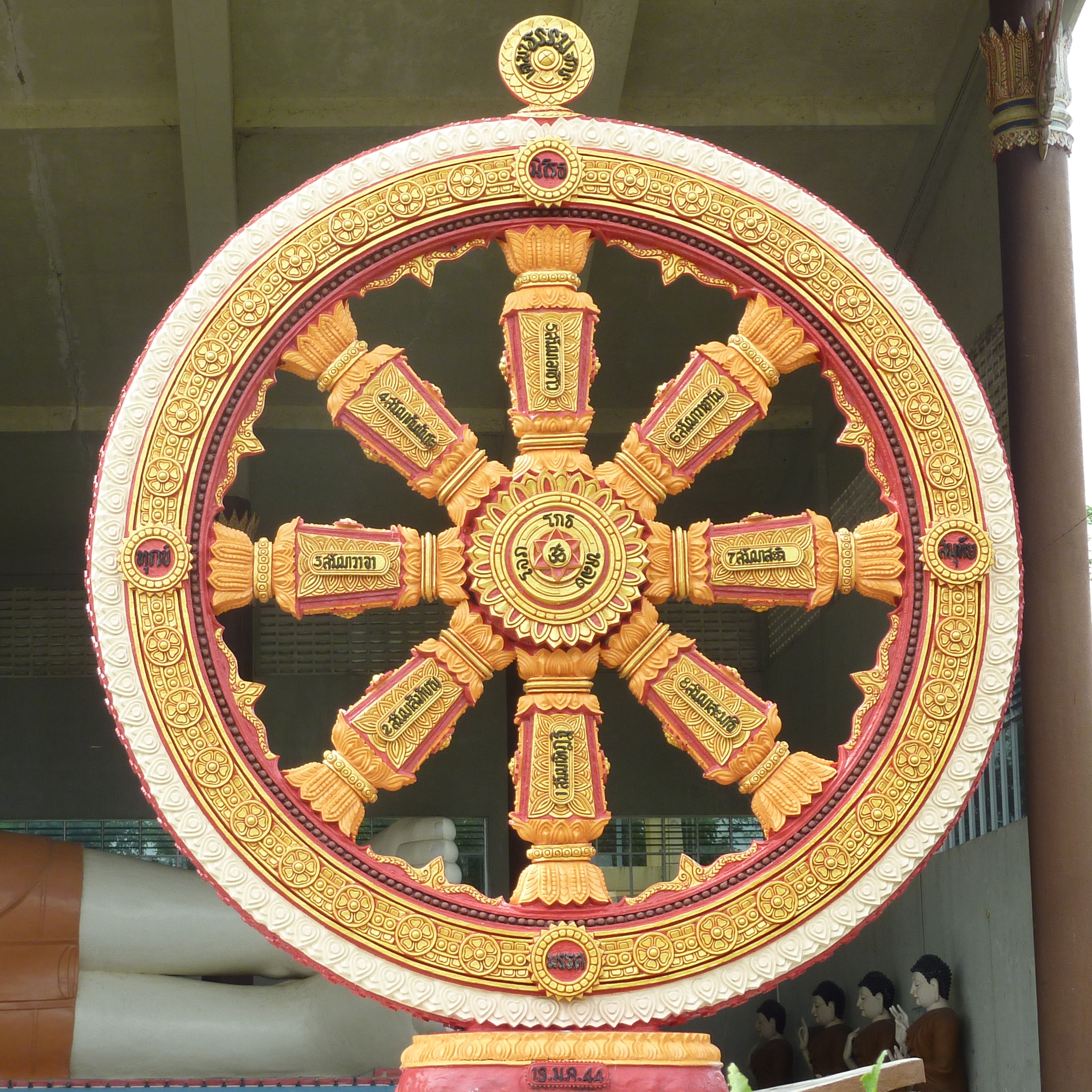
Wat Phothivihan, Tumpat, Kelantan

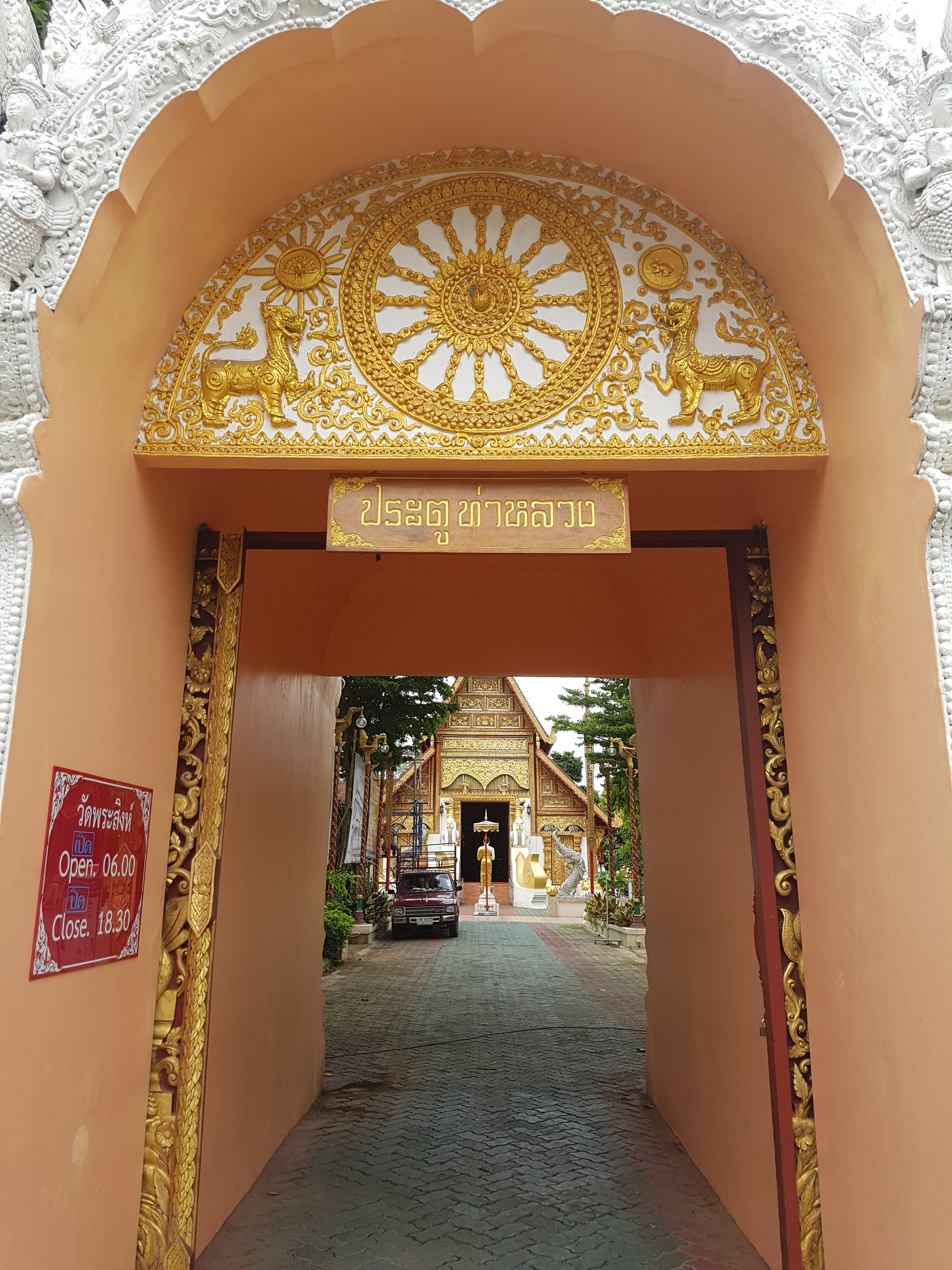
Entrance to Wat Phra Sing

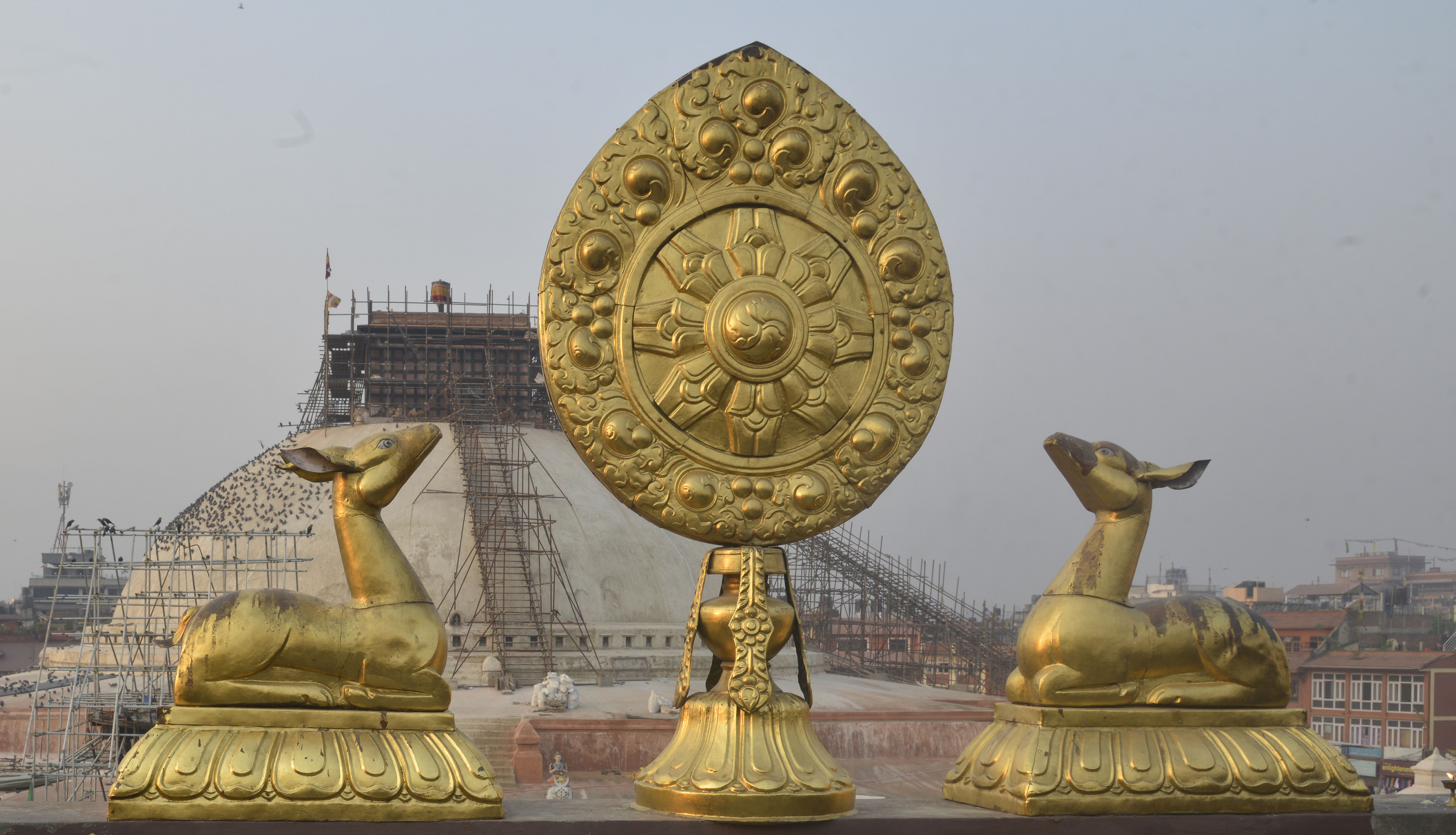
Dharmachakra at Boudanath

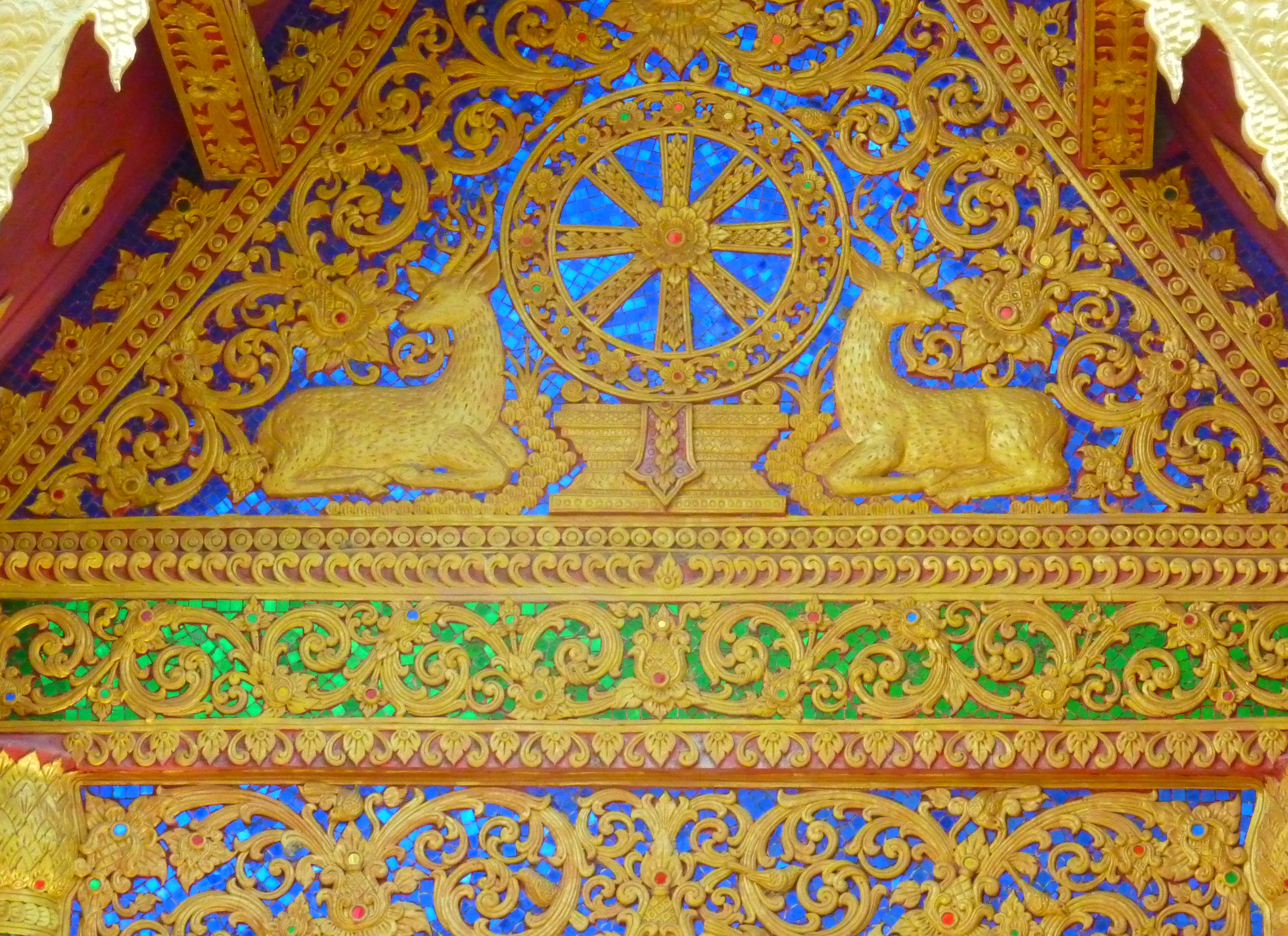
Dhammacakka on Main Gable, Wat Phra Putthabat Tak Pha, Lamphun

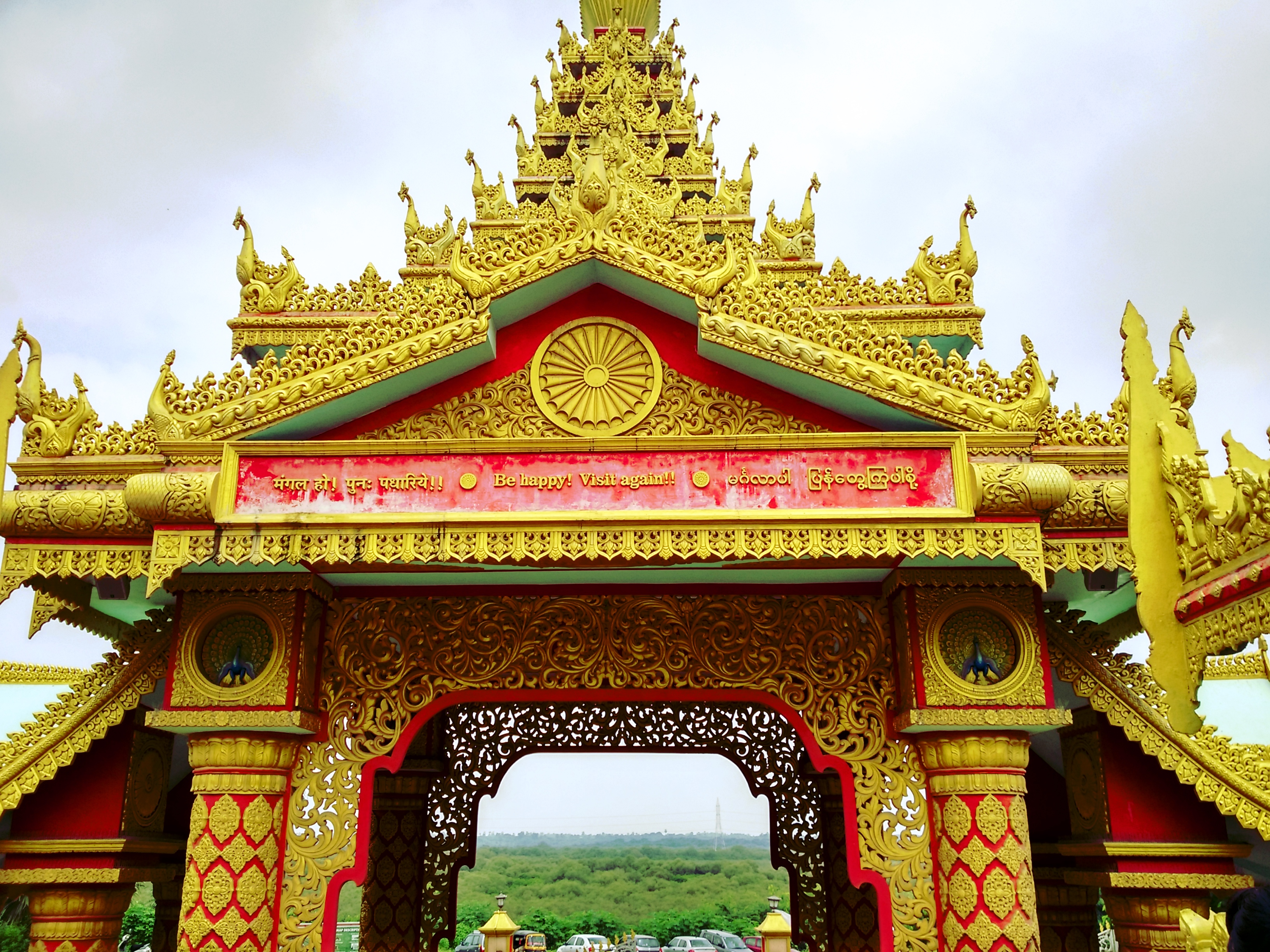
Entrance to the Global Vipassana Pagoda

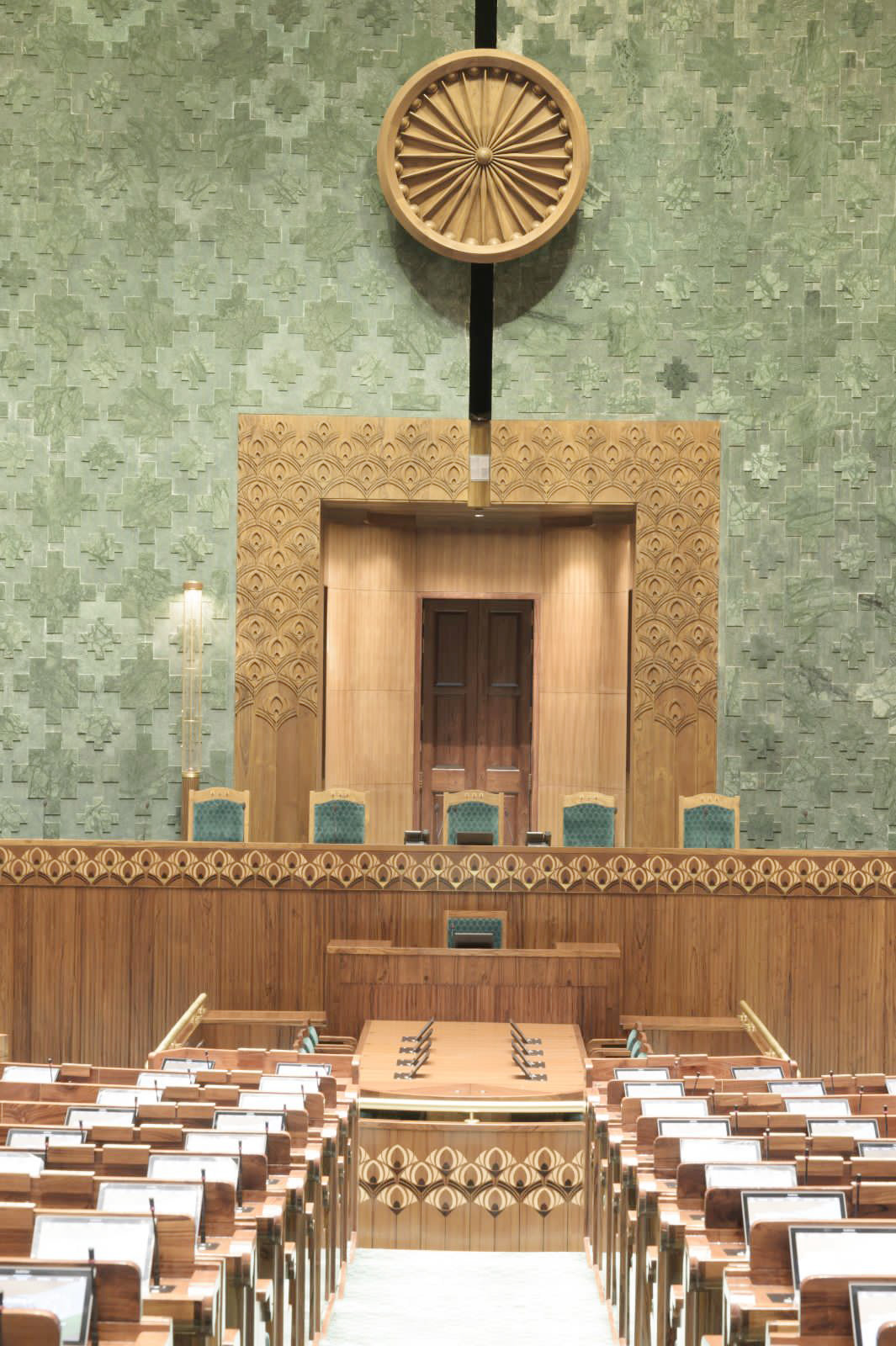
Lok Sabha chamber of the New Parliament building, New Delhi

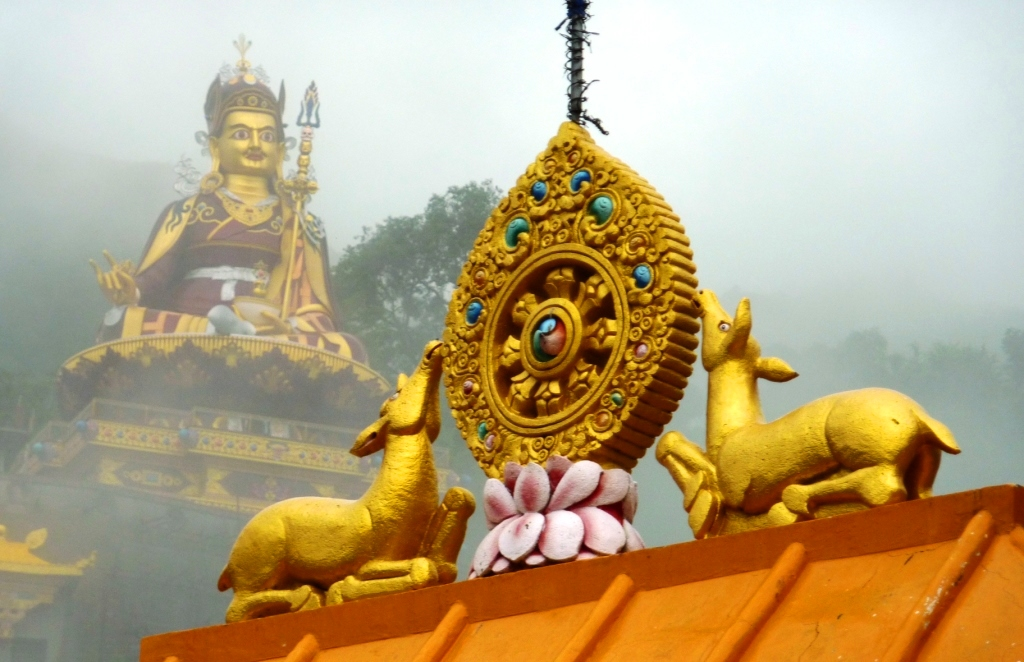
Dharmachakra in front of a statue of Padmasambhava. Lake Rewalsar, Himachal Pradesh

=== National flags and official symbolism ===
The Emblem of Mongolia includes the dharmachakra, a cintamani, a padma, blue khata and the Soyombo symbol

The Emblem of Sri Lanka, featuring a blue dharmachakra as the crest

The Emblem of India, featuring the Ashoka Chakra on the base panel representing the Dharmachakra

Emblem of the Supreme Court of India, which shows the dharmachakra on top of the Lion Capital (as was originally found in the Lion Capital of Ashoka).

The Flag of India has the Ashoka Chakra at its center representing the Dharmachakra.

The flag of the former Kingdom of Sikkim featured a version of the Dharmachakra

Emblem of Central Tibetan Administration with Tibetan Buddhist style Dharmachakra

The dhammacakka flag, the symbol of Buddhism in Thailand

The seal of Thammasat University in Thailand consisting of a Constitution on phan with a twelve-spoked dhammacakka

Colours of the National Scout Organization of Thailand

Flag used by the Indian Dalit Buddhist Movement

The insignia for Buddhist chaplains in the United States Armed Forces.

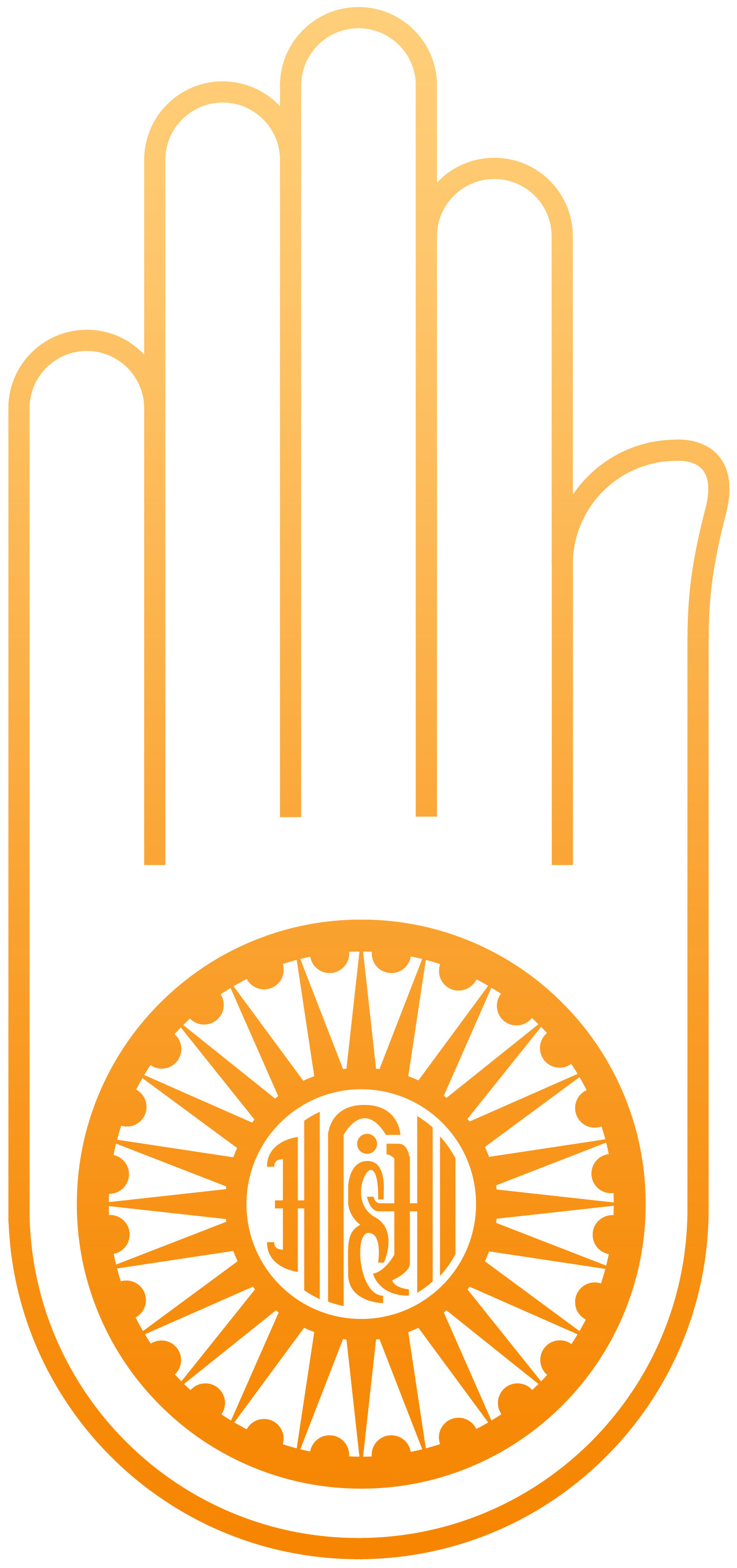
Wheel in Jain Symbol of Ahimsa represents dharmachakra

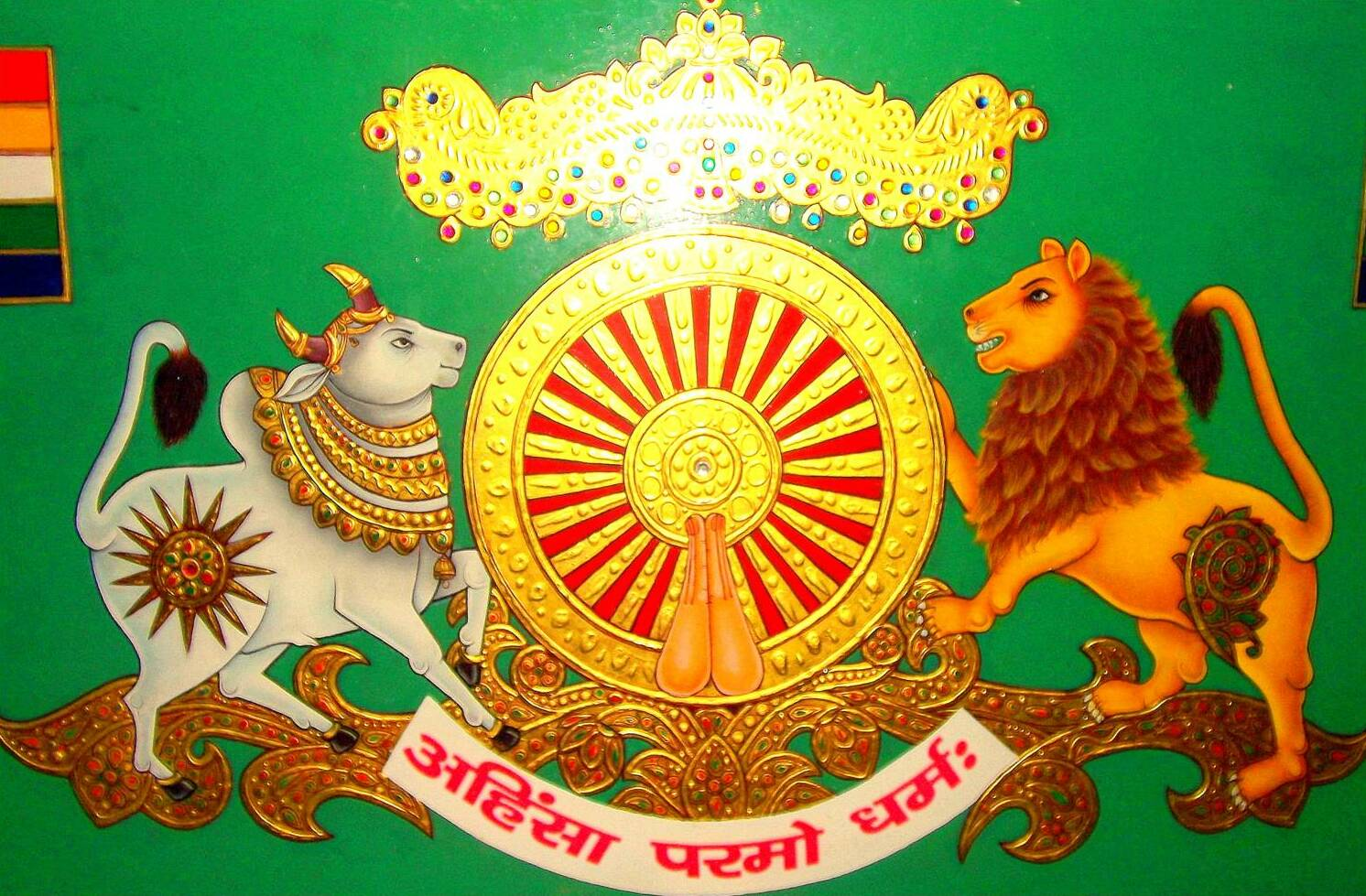
Jain illustration with dharmachakra and the motto Ahiṃsā Paramo Dharma (non-violence is the highest dharma).

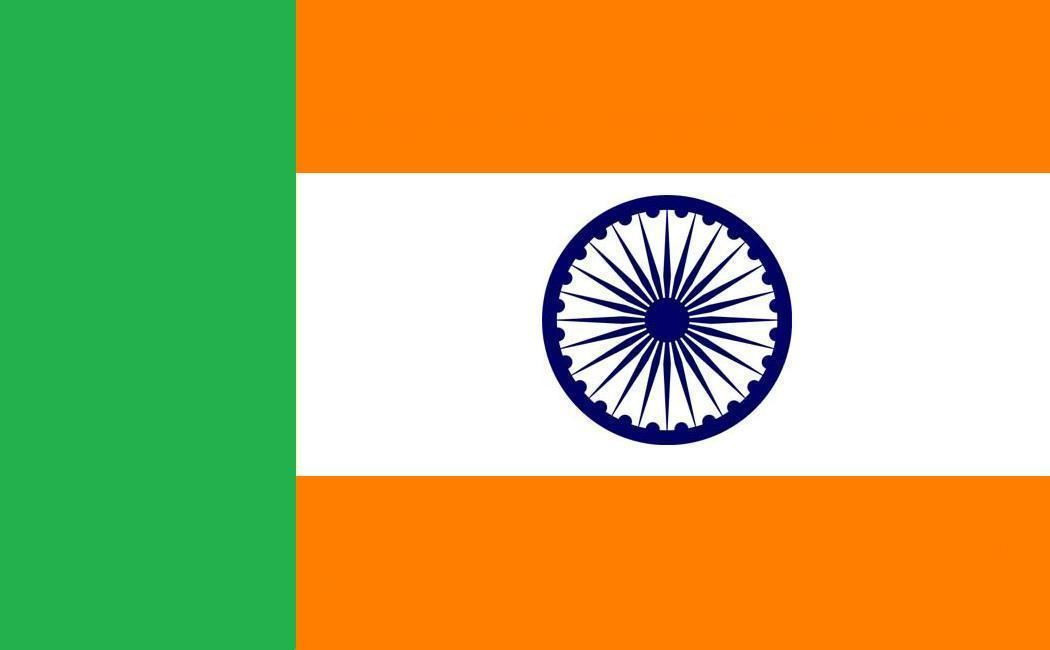
Flag for abolition of meat and speciesism, modeled after the flag of the Republic of India, with the Ashoka's Wheel of Dharma in the center.

USVA headstone emblem 2

Flag of the Romani People. It contains blue and green colour to represent the heaven and earth respectively, and uses a 16 spoke Dharmachakra to symbolise their tradition and to pay homage to their Indian origin.

== Sources ==
- Anthony, David W. (2007), The Horse The Wheel and Language. How Bronze-Age Riders From The Eurasian Steppes Shaped The Modern World, Princeton University Press
- Beer, Robert (2003), The Handbook of Tibetan Buddhist Symbols, Serindia Publications, Inc., ISBN 978-1932476033
- Day, Terence P. (1982), The Conception of Punishment in Early Indian Literature, Ontario: Wilfrid Laurier University Press, ISBN 0-919812-15-5
- Goetz, Hermann (1964), The art of India: five thousand years of Indian art, Crown
- Grünwedel, Albert; Gibson, Agnes C.; Burgess, James (1901), Buddhist art in India, Bernard Quaritch
- Harrison, Jane Ellen (2010) [1912], Themis: A Study of the Social Origins of Greek Religion, Cambridge University Press
- Hiltebeitel, Alf (2007), Hinduism. In: Joseph Kitagawa, "The Religious Traditions of Asia: Religion, History, and Culture". Digital printing 2007, Routledge, ISBN 9781136875908
- Inden, Ronald (1998), Ritual, Authority, And Cycle Time in Hindu Kingship. In: JF Richards, ed., "Kingship and Authority in South Asia", New Delhi: Oxford University Press
- Mallory, J.P. (1997), Encyclopedia of Indo-European Culture, London: Fitzroy Dearborn Publishers, ISBN 978-1-884964-98-5
- Nath, Vijay (March–April 2001), "From 'Brahmanism' to 'Hinduism': Negotiating the Myth of the Great Tradition", Social Scientist, 29 (3/4): 19–50, doi:10.2307/3518337, JSTOR 3518337
- Pal, Pratapaditya (1986), Indian Sculpture: Circa 500 B.C.–A.D. 700, University of California Press, ISBN 9780520059917
- Queen, Christopher S.; King, Sallie B. (1996), Engaged Buddhism: Buddhist liberation movements in Asia., SUNY Press, ISBN 9780791428443
- Samuel, Geoffrey (2010), The Origins of Yoga and Tantra. Indic Religions to the Thirteenth Century, Cambridge University Press
- Yan, Xiaojing (2009), The confluence of East and West in Nestorian Arts in China. In: Dietmar W. Winkler, Li Tang (eds.), Hidden Treasures and Intercultural Encounters: Studies on East Syriac Christianity in China and Central Asia, LIT Verlag Münster, ISBN 9783643500458
