= Sherman Township, Kansas =

Sherman Township is the name of a number of places in the U.S. state of Kansas:

- Sherman Township, Clay County, Kansas
- Sherman Township, Crawford County, Kansas
- Sherman Township, Decatur County, Kansas
- Sherman Township, Dickinson County, Kansas
- Sherman Township, Ellsworth County, Kansas
- Sherman Township, Grant County, Kansas
- Sherman Township, Leavenworth County, Kansas
- Sherman Township, Ottawa County, Kansas
- Sherman Township, Pottawatomie County, Kansas
- Sherman Township, Riley County, Kansas
- Sherman Township, Sedgwick County, Kansas
- Sherman Township, Washington County, Kansas

See also

- Sherman Township (disambiguation)
