= Sherman Township =

Sherman Township may refer to:

== Arkansas ==
- Sherman Township, Johnson County, Arkansas

== Illinois ==
- Sherman Township, Mason County, Illinois

== Iowa ==
- Sherman Township, Calhoun County, Iowa
- Sherman Township, Hardin County, Iowa
- Sherman Township, Jasper County, Iowa
- Sherman Township, Kossuth County, Iowa
- Sherman Township, Monona County, Iowa
- Sherman Township, Montgomery County, Iowa
- Sherman Township, Pocahontas County, Iowa
- Sherman Township, Sioux County, Iowa, in Sioux County, Iowa
- Sherman Township, Story County, Iowa

== Kansas ==
- Sherman Township, Clay County, Kansas
- Sherman Township, Crawford County, Kansas
- Sherman Township, Decatur County, Kansas
- Sherman Township, Dickinson County, Kansas
- Sherman Township, Ellsworth County, Kansas
- Sherman Township, Grant County, Kansas
- Sherman Township, Leavenworth County, Kansas
- Sherman Township, Ottawa County, Kansas, in Ottawa County, Kansas
- Sherman Township, Pottawatomie County, Kansas, in Pottawatomie County, Kansas
- Sherman Township, Riley County, Kansas, in Riley County, Kansas
- Sherman Township, Sedgwick County, Kansas
- Sherman Township, Washington County, Kansas, in Washington County, Kansas

== Michigan ==
- Sherman Township, Gladwin County, Michigan
- Sherman Township, Huron County, Michigan
- Sherman Township, Iosco County, Michigan
- Sherman Township, Isabella County, Michigan
- Sherman Township, Keweenaw County, Michigan
- Sherman Township, Mason County, Michigan
- Sherman Township, Newaygo County, Michigan
- Sherman Township, Osceola County, Michigan
- Sherman Township, St. Joseph County, Michigan

== Minnesota ==
- Sherman Township, Redwood County, Minnesota

== Missouri ==
- Sherman Township, Cass County, Missouri
- Sherman Township, Dallas County, Missouri
- Sherman Township, DeKalb County, Missouri
- Sherman Township, Harrison County, Missouri
- Sherman Township, Putnam County, Missouri

== Nebraska ==
- Sherman Township, Antelope County, Nebraska
- Sherman Township, Cuming County, Nebraska
- Sherman Township, Gage County, Nebraska
- Sherman Township, Kearney County, Nebraska
- Sherman Township, Platte County, Nebraska

== North Dakota ==
- Sherman Township, Bottineau County, North Dakota

== Ohio ==
- Sherman Township, Huron County, Ohio

== Oklahoma ==
- Sherman Township, Kingfisher County, Oklahoma

== South Dakota ==
- Sherman Township, Brookings County, South Dakota
- Sherman Township, Corson County, South Dakota
- Sherman Township, Faulk County, South Dakota

== See also ==
- Sherman (disambiguation)
