= Chapman Township, Ottawa County, Kansas =

Township in Ottawa County, Kansas, U.S.

Chapman Township
- Township
- Location within Ottawa County
- Coordinates: 39.262714°N 97.425607°W
- Country: United States
- State: Kansas
- County: Ottawa

Area
  - Total: 35.712 sq mi (92.49 km^{2})
  - Land: 35.712 sq mi (92.49 km^{2})
  - Water: 0 sq mi (0 km^{2}) 0%
- Elevation: 1,417 ft (432 m)

Population (2020)
  - Total: 69
  - Density: 1.9/sq mi (0.75/km^{2})
- Time zone: UTC-6 (CST)
  - Summer (DST): UTC-5 (CDT)
- Area code: 785
- GNIS feature ID: 476162

Chapman Township is a township in Ottawa County, Kansas, United States. As of the 2020 census, its population was 69.

== Geography ==
Chapman Township covers an area of 35.712 square miles (92.49 square kilometers).

=== Adjacent townships ===
- Starr Township, Cloud County (north)
- Five Creeks Township, Clay County (northeast)
- Oakland Township, Clay County (east)
- Chapman Township, Clay County (southeast)
- Durham Township, Ottawa County (south)
- Grant Township, Ottawa County (southwest)
- Sherman Township, Ottawa County (west)
- Oakland Township, Cloud County (northwest)
