= Durham Township, Kansas =

Township in Ottawa County, Kansas, U.S.

Durham Township
- Township
- Location within Ottawa County
- Coordinates: 39.19474°N 97.419113°W
- Country: United States
- State: Kansas
- County: Ottawa

Area
  - Total: 35.783 sq mi (92.68 km^{2})
  - Land: 35.775 sq mi (92.66 km^{2})
  - Water: 0.008 sq mi (0.021 km^{2}) 0.02%
- Elevation: 1,434 ft (437 m)

Population (2020)
  - Total: 16
  - Density: 0.45/sq mi (0.17/km^{2})
- Time zone: UTC-6 (CST)
  - Summer (DST): UTC-5 (CDT)
- Area code: 785
- GNIS feature ID: 476289

Durham Township is a township in Ottawa County, Kansas, United States. As of the 2020 census, its population was 16.

== Geography ==
Durham Township covers an area of 35.783 square miles (92.68 square kilometers).

=== Adjacent townships ===
- Chapman Township, Ottawa County (north)
- Oakland Township, Clay County (northeast)
- Chapman Township, Clay County (east)
- Flora Township, Dickinson County (southeast)
- Ottawa Township, Ottawa County (south)
- Richland Township, Ottawa County (southwest)
- Grant Township, Ottawa County (west)
- Sherman Township, Ottawa County (northwest)
