= Ottawa Township, Ottawa County, Kansas =

Township in Ottawa County, Kansas, U.S.

Ottawa Township
- Township
- Location within Ottawa County
- Coordinates: 39.09572°N 97.412149°W
- Country: United States
- State: Kansas
- County: Ottawa

Area
  - Total: 35.889 sq mi (92.95 km^{2})
  - Land: 35.881 sq mi (92.93 km^{2})
  - Water: 0.008 sq mi (0.021 km^{2}) 0.02%
- Elevation: 1,348 ft (411 m)

Population (2020)
  - Total: 36
  - Density: 1.0/sq mi (0.39/km^{2})
- Time zone: UTC-6 (CST)
  - Summer (DST): UTC-5 (CDT)
- Area code: 785
- GNIS feature ID: 476297

Ottawa Township is a township in Ottawa County, Kansas, United States. As of the 2020 census, its population was 36.

== Geography ==
Ottawa Township covers an area of 35.889 square miles (92.95 square kilometers).

=== Adjacent townships ===
- Durham Township, Ottawa County (north)
- Chapman Township, Clay County (northeast)
- Flora Township, Dickinson County (east)
- Willowdale Township, Dickinson County (southeast)
- Lincoln Township, Ottawa County (south)
- Buckeye Township, Ottawa County (southwest)
- Richland Township, Ottawa County (west)
- Grant Township, Ottawa County (northwest)
