= Sherman Township, Michigan =

Sherman Township is the name of a number of places in the U.S. state of Michigan:

- Sherman Township, Gladwin County, Michigan
- Sherman Township, Huron County, Michigan
- Sherman Township, Iosco County, Michigan
- Sherman Township, Isabella County, Michigan
- Sherman Township, Keweenaw County, Michigan
- Sherman Township, Mason County, Michigan
- Sherman Township, Newaygo County, Michigan
- Sherman Township, Osceola County, Michigan
- Sherman Township, St. Joseph County, Michigan

See also

- Sherman Township (disambiguation)
