= Lincoln Township, Ottawa County, Kansas =

Township in Ottawa County, Kansas, U.S.

Lincoln Township
- Township
- Location within Ottawa County
- Coordinates: 39.011865°N 97.422472°W
- Country: United States
- State: Kansas
- County: Ottawa

Area
  - Total: 35.872 sq mi (92.91 km^{2})
  - Land: 35.843 sq mi (92.83 km^{2})
  - Water: 0.029 sq mi (0.075 km^{2}) 0.08%
- Elevation: 1,283 ft (391 m)

Population (2020)
  - Total: 155
  - Density: 4.32/sq mi (1.67/km^{2})
- Time zone: UTC-6 (CST)
  - Summer (DST): UTC-5 (CDT)
- Area code: 785
- GNIS feature ID: 476472

Lincoln Township is a township in Ottawa County, Kansas, United States. As of the 2020 census, its population was 155.

== Geography ==
Lincoln Township covers an area of 35.872 square miles (92.91 square kilometers). The Solomon River flows through it.

=== Communities ===
- Niles

=== Adjacent townships ===
- Ottawa Township, Ottawa County (north)
- Flora Township, Dickinson County (northeast)
- Willowdale Township, Dickinson County (east)
- Lincoln Township, Dickinson County (southeast)
- Dayton Township, Saline County (south)
- Cambria Township, Saline County (southwest)
- Buckeye Township, Ottawa County (west)
- Richland Township, Ottawa County (northwest)

== Transportation ==
=== Major highways ===
- K-18
