= Republican Township =

Republican Township may refer to the following townships in the United States:

- Republican City Township, Harlan County, Nebraska
- Republican Township, Jefferson County, Indiana
- Republican Township, Clay County, Kansas
