= Highland Township, Clay County, Kansas =

Highland Township
- Township
- Location in Clay County
- Coordinates: 39°26′00″N 097°00′46″W
- Country: United States
- State: Kansas
- County: Clay

Area
  - Total: 35.4 sq mi (91.6 km^{2})
  - Land: 35.34 sq mi (91.54 km^{2})
  - Water: 0.023 sq mi (0.06 km^{2}) 0.07%
- Elevation: 1,381 ft (421 m)

Population (2020)
  - Total: 254
  - Density: 7.19/sq mi (2.77/km^{2})
- GNIS feature ID: 1729702

Highland Township is a township in Clay County, Kansas, United States. As of the 2020 census, its population was 254.

== Geography ==
Highland Township covers an area of 35.37 square miles (91.6 km^{2}) and contains one incorporated settlement, Green. According to the USGS, it contains three cemeteries: Ebenezer, Fancy Creek and Green.
