= Flora Township =

Flora Township may refer to:

- Flora Township, Boone County, Illinois
- Flora Township, Dickinson County, Kansas
- Flora Township, Renville County, Minnesota
