= Grant Township, Ottawa County, Kansas =

Township in Ottawa County, Kansas, U.S.

Grant Township
- Township
- Location within Ottawa County
- Coordinates: 39.187255°N 97.558098°W
- Country: United States
- State: Kansas
- County: Ottawa

Area
  - Total: 36.217 sq mi (93.80 km^{2})
  - Land: 36.212 sq mi (93.79 km^{2})
  - Water: 0.005 sq mi (0.013 km^{2}) 0.01%
- Elevation: 1,460 ft (450 m)

Population (2020)
  - Total: 75
  - Density: 2.1/sq mi (0.80/km^{2})
- Time zone: UTC-6 (CST)
  - Summer (DST): UTC-5 (CDT)
- Area code: 785
- GNIS feature ID: 476285

Grant Township is a township in Ottawa County, Kansas, United States. As of the 2020 census, its population was 75.

== Geography ==
Grant Township covers an area of 36.217 square miles (93.80 square kilometers).

=== Communities ===
- Wells

=== Adjacent townships ===
- Sherman Township, Ottawa County (north)
- Chapman Township, Ottawa County (northeast)
- Durham Township, Ottawa County (east)
- Ottawa Township, Ottawa County (southeast)
- Richland Township, Ottawa County (south)
- Concord Township, Ottawa County (southwest)
- Blaine Township, Ottawa County (west)
- Logan Township, Ottawa County (northwest)
