= Vine Creek, Kansas =

Ghost town in Kansas, U.S.

Coordinates: 39°07′05″N 97°24′57″W

Vine Creek is a ghost town in Ottawa County, Kansas, United States.

== History ==
Vine Creek (also known historically as Vine) had a post office from 1879 until 1932.

In 1888, a rail line of the Chicago, Kansas and Western Railroad opened from Manchester, Kansas in the east to Barnard in the west, a 43 mile line, with a stop at Vine Creek. The Atchison, Topeka and Santa Fe Railway acquired the railroad in 1901. An application was filed in 1983 to abandon this "Minneapolis District" line.

The 1912 cyclopedia of Kansas described Vine as a "village" on Atchison, Topeka and Santa Fe Railway, with "a money order postoffice and telegraph and express office. The population in 1910 was 50. The railroad name is Vine Creek."

== Education ==
Children living near the former community is served by North Ottawa County USD 239 public school district.
