= Gill Township =

Gill Township may refer to the following townships in the United States:

- Gill Township, Sullivan County, Indiana
- Gill Township, Clay County, Kansas
