= Hayes Township, Clay County, Kansas =

Hayes Township
- Township
- Location in Clay County
- Coordinates: 39°26′30″N 097°05′31″W
- Country: United States
- State: Kansas
- County: Clay

Area
  - Total: 35.67 sq mi (92.39 km^{2})
  - Land: 35.67 sq mi (92.39 km^{2})
  - Water: 0 sq mi (0 km^{2}) 0%
- Elevation: 1,300 ft (400 m)

Population (2020)
  - Total: 184
  - Density: 5.16/sq mi (1.99/km^{2})
- GNIS feature ID: 0476025

Hayes Township is a township in Clay County, Kansas, United States. As of the 2020 census, its population was 184.

== Geography ==
Hayes Township covers an area of 35.67 square miles (92.4 km^{2}) and contains no incorporated settlements. According to the USGS, it contains four cemeteries: Brethren in Christ, Greenwood, Hayes and Pleasant Hill.

== Transportation ==
Hayes Township contains one airport or landing strip, Holmes Airpark.
