= Blaine Township, Clay County, Kansas =

Blaine Township
- Township
- Location in Clay County
- Coordinates: 39°21′50″N 097°11′01″W
- Country: United States
- State: Kansas
- County: Clay

Area
  - Total: 42.31 sq mi (109.59 km^{2})
  - Land: 41.92 sq mi (108.56 km^{2})
  - Water: 0.40 sq mi (1.03 km^{2}) 0.94%
- Elevation: 1,204 ft (367 m)

Population (2020)
  - Total: 214
  - Density: 5.11/sq mi (1.97/km^{2})
- GNIS feature ID: 0476018

Blaine Township is a township in Clay County, Kansas, United States. As of the 2020 census, its population was 214.

== Geography ==
Blaine Township covers an area of 42.31 square miles (109.6 km^{2}) and contains no incorporated settlements. According to the USGS, it contains two cemeteries: Republican City and Wilson.

The streams of Chestnut Branch, Huntress Creek, North Branch Five Creek, Otter Creek and Reeder Branch Five Creek run through this township.
