= Buckeye Township, Ottawa County, Kansas =

Township in Ottawa County, Kansas, U.S.

Buckeye Township
- Township
- Location within Ottawa County
- Coordinates: 39.002461°N 97.533501°W
- Country: United States
- State: Kansas
- County: Ottawa

Area
  - Total: 30.08 sq mi (77.9 km^{2})
  - Land: 30.025 sq mi (77.76 km^{2})
  - Water: 0.055 sq mi (0.14 km^{2}) 0.18%
- Elevation: 1,201 ft (366 m)

Population (2020)
  - Total: 98
  - Density: 3.3/sq mi (1.3/km^{2})
- Time zone: UTC-6 (CST)
  - Summer (DST): UTC-5 (CDT)
- Area code: 785
- GNIS feature ID: 476468

Buckeye Township is a township in Ottawa County, Kansas, United States. As of the 2020 census, its population was 98.

== Geography ==
Buckeye Township covers an area of 30.08 square miles (77.9 square kilometers). The Solomon River flows through it.

=== Adjacent townships ===
- Richland Township, Ottawa County (north)
- Ottawa Township, Ottawa County (northeast)
- Lincoln Township, Ottawa County (east)
- Dayton Township, Saline County (southeast)
- Cambria Township, Saline County (south)
- Bennington Township, Ottawa County (west)

== Transportation ==
=== Major highways ===
- K-18
