= Exeter Township, Kansas =

Exeter Township
- Township
- Location in Clay County
- Coordinates: 39°16′00″N 097°12′01″W
- Country: United States
- State: Kansas
- County: Clay

Area
  - Total: 36.19 sq mi (93.73 km^{2})
  - Land: 36.16 sq mi (93.65 km^{2})
  - Water: 0.027 sq mi (0.07 km^{2}) 0.07%
- Elevation: 1,332 ft (406 m)

Population (2020)
  - Total: 60
  - Density: 1.7/sq mi (0.64/km^{2})
- GNIS feature ID: 0476172

Exeter Township is a township in Clay County, Kansas, United States. As of the 2020 census, its population was 60.

== Geography ==
Exeter Township covers an area of 36.19 square miles (93.7 km^{2}) and contains no incorporated settlements. According to the USGS, it contains three cemeteries: Lutheran, Pleasant Ridge and Wesleyan.
