= Browndale, Kansas =

- Ghost town
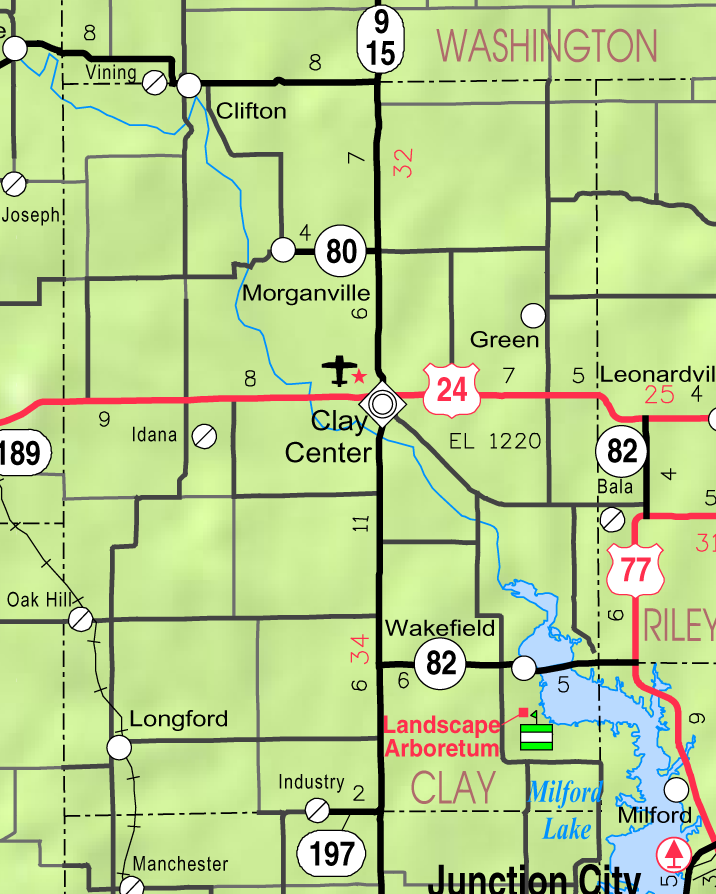
- KDOT map of Clay County (legend)

- Location within Kansas Location within the United States
- Coordinates: 39°21′35″N 97°21′03″W
- Country: United States
- State: Kansas
- County: Clay
- Elevation: 1,306 ft (398 m)

Population
  - Total: 0
- Time zone: UTC-6 (CST)
  - Summer (DST): UTC-5 (CDT)
- Area code: 785
- FIPS code: 20-08665
- GNIS ID: 484767

Browndale is a ghost town in Clay County, Kansas, United States..

== History ==
Browndale was located on the Union Pacific Railroad.
