= 1960 United States presidential election in Kansas =

- November 8, 1960

Nominee	Richard Nixon	John F. Kennedy
Party	Republican	Democratic
Home state	California	Massachusetts
Running mate	Henry Cabot Lodge Jr.	Lyndon B. Johnson
Electoral vote	8	0
Popular vote	561,474	363,213
Percentage	60.45%	39.10%
County results
Nixon
50–60%
60–70%
70–80%
Kennedy
50–60%
60–70%
President before election
Dwight D. Eisenhower
Republican
Elected President
John F. Kennedy
Democratic

The 1960 United States presidential election in Kansas took place on November 8, 1960, as part of the 1960 United States presidential election. Voters chose eight representatives, or electors, to the Electoral College, who voted for president and vice president.

Kansas was won by incumbent Vice President Richard Nixon (R–California), running with United States Ambassador to the United Nations Henry Cabot Lodge Jr., with 60.45 percent of the popular vote, against Senator John F. Kennedy (D–Massachusetts), running with Senator Lyndon B. Johnson, with 39.10 percent of the popular vote.

Kennedy carried only heavily Catholic Ellis County and urbanized Wyandotte County, the home of Kansas City, Kansas, which has become the Democrats' most reliable county in Kansas during presidential elections.

With 60.45 percent of the popular vote, Kansas would prove to be Nixon's second strongest state in the 1960 election after neighbouring Nebraska.

== Results ==
1960 United States presidential election in Kansas
Party	Candidate	Votes	%
Republican	Richard Nixon	561,474	60.45%
Democratic	John F. Kennedy	363,213	39.10%
Prohibition	Rutherford Decker	4,138	0.45%
Total votes		928,825	100%

=== Results by county ===
County	Richard Nixon Republican		John F. Kennedy Democratic		Rutherford Decker Prohibition		Margin		Total votes cast
County	#	%	#	%	#	%	#	%	Total votes cast
Allen	4,947	65.89%	2,540	33.83%	21	0.28%	2,407	32.06%	7,508
Anderson	2,665	62.35%	1,589	37.18%	20	0.47%	1,076	25.17%	4,274
Atchison	4,793	52.33%	4,336	47.34%	31	0.34%	457	4.99%	9,160
Barber	2,703	66.48%	1,347	33.13%	16	0.39%	1,356	33.35%	4,066
Barton	7,599	55.61%	6,036	44.17%	30	0.22%	1,563	11.44%	13,665
Bourbon	5,062	63.03%	2,928	36.46%	41	0.51%	2,134	26.57%	8,031
Brown	4,707	72.25%	1,773	27.21%	35	0.54%	2,934	45.04%	6,515
Butler	10,059	58.37%	7,112	41.27%	61	0.35%	2,947	17.10%	17,232
Chase	1,276	64.06%	708	35.54%	8	0.40%	568	28.52%	1,992
Chautauqua	2,160	70.54%	885	28.90%	17	0.56%	1,275	41.64%	3,062
Cherokee	5,753	56.45%	4,366	42.84%	73	0.72%	1,387	13.61%	10,192
Cheyenne	1,622	71.42%	636	28.01%	13	0.57%	986	43.41%	2,271
Clark	1,286	70.27%	538	29.40%	6	0.33%	748	40.87%	1,830
Clay	3,937	75.33%	1,246	23.84%	43	0.82%	2,691	51.49%	5,226
Cloud	4,045	60.58%	2,607	39.04%	25	0.37%	1,438	21.54%	6,677
Coffey	2,925	69.69%	1,263	30.09%	9	0.21%	1,662	39.60%	4,197
Comanche	1,187	71.85%	460	27.85%	5	0.30%	727	44.00%	1,652
Cowley	10,276	61.98%	6,205	37.42%	99	0.60%	4,071	24.56%	16,580
Crawford	9,383	52.78%	8,325	46.83%	69	0.39%	1,058	5.95%	17,777
Decatur	1,846	63.83%	1,038	35.89%	8	0.28%	808	27.94%	2,892
Dickinson	6,956	69.18%	3,054	30.37%	45	0.45%	3,902	38.81%	10,055
Doniphan	2,882	67.38%	1,383	32.34%	12	0.28%	1,499	35.04%	4,277
Douglas	11,337	66.43%	5,690	33.34%	38	0.22%	5,647	33.09%	17,065
Edwards	1,588	61.46%	986	38.16%	10	0.39%	602	23.30%	2,584
Elk	1,830	68.46%	823	30.79%	20	0.75%	1,007	37.67%	2,673
Ellis	3,156	35.16%	5,815	64.78%	6	0.07%	-2,659	-29.62%	8,977
Ellsworth	2,189	59.37%	1,488	40.36%	10	0.27%	701	19.01%	3,687
Finney	3,720	59.62%	2,490	39.90%	30	0.48%	1,230	19.72%	6,240
Ford	5,200	57.67%	3,792	42.05%	25	0.28%	1,408	15.62%	9,017
Franklin	6,158	68.20%	2,824	31.28%	47	0.52%	3,334	36.92%	9,029
Geary	3,789	61.28%	2,365	38.25%	29	0.47%	1,424	23.03%	6,183
Gove	1,065	55.85%	828	43.42%	14	0.73%	237	12.43%	1,907
Graham	1,572	62.96%	918	36.76%	7	0.28%	654	26.20%	2,497
Grant	1,235	63.59%	702	36.15%	5	0.26%	533	27.44%	1,942
Gray	1,150	60.56%	744	39.18%	5	0.26%	406	21.38%	1,899
Greeley	645	70.57%	262	28.67%	7	0.77%	383	41.90%	914
Greenwood	3,758	67.46%	1,804	32.38%	9	0.16%	1,954	35.08%	5,571
Hamilton	885	59.76%	591	39.91%	5	0.34%	294	19.85%	1,481
Harper	3,158	68.33%	1,439	31.13%	25	0.54%	1,719	37.20%	4,622
Harvey	7,798	68.38%	3,537	31.02%	69	0.61%	4,261	37.36%	11,404
Haskell	853	64.23%	471	35.47%	4	0.30%	382	28.76%	1,328
Hodgeman	926	61.45%	570	37.82%	11	0.73%	356	23.63%	1,507
Jackson	3,279	67.46%	1,567	32.24%	15	0.31%	1,712	35.22%	4,861
Jefferson	3,353	65.73%	1,739	34.09%	9	0.18%	1,614	31.64%	5,101
Jewell	2,914	72.25%	1,095	27.15%	24	0.60%	1,819	45.10%	4,033
Johnson	43,026	66.16%	21,914	33.70%	93	0.14%	21,112	32.46%	65,033
Kearny	846	62.11%	513	37.67%	3	0.22%	333	24.44%	1,362
Kingman	2,904	62.29%	1,735	37.22%	23	0.49%	1,169	25.07%	4,662
Kiowa	1,662	74.56%	555	24.90%	12	0.54%	1,107	49.66%	2,229
Labette	7,491	58.49%	5,248	40.98%	68	0.53%	2,243	17.51%	12,807
Lane	902	65.41%	462	33.50%	15	1.09%	440	31.91%	1,379
Leavenworth	7,870	53.06%	6,926	46.70%	36	0.24%	944	6.36%	14,832
Lincoln	2,052	71.15%	822	28.50%	10	0.35%	1,230	42.65%	2,884
Linn	2,824	70.18%	1,176	29.22%	24	0.60%	1,648	40.96%	4,024
Logan	1,243	65.22%	651	34.16%	12	0.63%	592	31.06%	1,906
Lyon	7,470	60.90%	4,755	38.77%	41	0.33%	2,715	22.13%	12,266
McPherson	7,920	73.61%	2,774	25.78%	65	0.60%	5,146	47.83%	10,759
Marion	5,250	73.20%	1,904	26.55%	18	0.25%	3,346	46.65%	7,172
Marshall	4,932	62.50%	2,931	37.14%	28	0.35%	2,001	25.36%	7,891
Meade	1,826	70.47%	754	29.10%	11	0.42%	1,072	41.37%	2,591
Miami	4,857	57.85%	3,505	41.75%	34	0.40%	1,352	16.10%	8,396
Mitchell	2,779	61.80%	1,692	37.63%	26	0.58%	1,087	24.17%	4,497
Montgomery	12,536	60.74%	7,938	38.46%	164	0.79%	4,598	22.28%	20,638
Morris	2,413	67.40%	1,148	32.07%	19	0.53%	1,265	35.33%	3,580
Morton	918	60.67%	586	38.73%	9	0.59%	332	21.94%	1,513
Nemaha	3,360	53.61%	2,884	46.02%	23	0.37%	476	7.59%	6,267
Neosho	5,877	62.71%	3,451	36.83%	43	0.46%	2,426	25.88%	9,371
Ness	1,683	63.39%	960	36.16%	12	0.45%	723	27.23%	2,655
Norton	2,781	68.01%	1,300	31.79%	8	0.20%	1,481	36.22%	4,089
Osage	3,880	64.02%	2,150	35.47%	31	0.51%	1,730	28.55%	6,061
Osborne	2,731	69.97%	1,152	29.52%	20	0.51%	1,579	40.45%	3,903
Ottawa	2,190	66.81%	1,072	32.70%	16	0.49%	1,118	34.11%	3,278
Pawnee	2,618	58.32%	1,853	41.28%	18	0.40%	765	17.04%	4,489
Phillips	3,123	75.34%	1,004	24.22%	18	0.43%	2,119	51.12%	4,145
Pottawatomie	3,666	63.16%	2,125	36.61%	13	0.22%	1,541	26.55%	5,804
Pratt	3,501	63.59%	1,968	35.74%	37	0.67%	1,533	27.85%	5,506
Rawlins	1,560	61.73%	951	37.63%	16	0.63%	609	24.10%	2,527
Reno	14,655	60.21%	9,557	39.27%	127	0.52%	5,098	20.94%	24,339
Republic	3,358	65.62%	1,724	33.69%	35	0.68%	1,634	31.93%	5,117
Rice	4,329	64.81%	2,328	34.85%	23	0.34%	2,001	29.96%	6,680
Riley	9,068	71.97%	3,482	27.63%	50	0.40%	5,586	44.34%	12,600
Rooks	2,840	63.25%	1,639	36.50%	11	0.24%	1,201	26.75%	4,490
Rush	1,668	53.86%	1,418	45.79%	11	0.36%	250	8.07%	3,097
Russell	3,607	65.57%	1,870	33.99%	24	0.44%	1,737	31.58%	5,501
Saline	11,023	62.74%	6,495	36.97%	50	0.28%	4,528	25.77%	17,568
Scott	1,514	71.28%	598	28.15%	12	0.56%	916	43.13%	2,124
Sedgwick	73,501	55.23%	58,887	44.25%	696	0.52%	14,614	10.98%	133,084
Seward	3,974	70.44%	1,654	29.32%	14	0.25%	2,320	41.12%	5,642
Shawnee	33,803	60.63%	21,799	39.10%	147	0.26%	12,004	21.53%	55,749
Sheridan	1,047	51.93%	954	47.32%	15	0.74%	93	4.61%	2,016
Sherman	2,030	65.08%	1,074	34.43%	15	0.48%	956	30.65%	3,119
Smith	3,013	71.88%	1,157	27.60%	22	0.52%	1,856	44.28%	4,192
Stafford	2,531	65.54%	1,305	33.79%	26	0.67%	1,226	31.75%	3,862
Stanton	627	65.72%	323	33.86%	4	0.42%	304	31.86%	954
Stevens	1,405	68.74%	630	30.82%	9	0.44%	775	37.92%	2,044
Sumner	7,219	61.51%	4,462	38.02%	55	0.47%	2,757	23.49%	11,736
Thomas	2,081	61.50%	1,285	37.97%	18	0.53%	796	23.53%	3,384
Trego	1,426	61.76%	875	37.90%	8	0.35%	551	23.86%	2,309
Wabaunsee	2,351	70.58%	969	29.09%	11	0.33%	1,382	41.49%	3,331
Wallace	727	68.20%	339	31.80%	0	0.00%	388	36.40%	1,066
Washington	3,707	68.09%	1,706	31.34%	31	0.57%	2,001	36.75%	5,444
Wichita	702	55.63%	554	43.90%	6	0.48%	148	11.73%	1,262
Wilson	4,333	67.77%	2,034	31.81%	27	0.42%	2,299	35.96%	6,394
Woodson	1,853	67.36%	888	32.28%	10	0.36%	965	35.08%	2,751
Wyandotte	34,764	45.27%	41,433	53.95%	604	0.79%	-6,669	-8.68%	76,801
Totals	561,474	60.45%	363,213	39.10%	4,138	0.45%	198,261	21.35%	928,825

==== Counties that flipped from Republican to Democratic ====
- Ellis

== See also ==
- United States presidential elections in Kansas
