= Athelstane Township, Kansas =

Athelstane Township
- Township
- Location in Clay County

- Location within the state of Kansas
- Coordinates: 39°10′45″N 097°12′11″W
- Country: United States
- State: Kansas
- County: Clay

Area
  - Total: 36.07 sq mi (93.43 km^{2})
  - Land: 36.1 sq mi (93.4 km^{2})
  - Water: 0.012 sq mi (0.03 km^{2}) 0.03%
- Elevation: 1,204 ft (367 m)

Population (2020)
  - Total: 106
  - Density: 2.94/sq mi (1.13/km^{2})
- Time zone: UTC-6 (CST)
  - Summer (DST): UTC-5 (CDT)
- FIPS code: 20-02950
- GNIS ID: 476298

Athelstane Township is a township in Clay County, Kansas, United States. As of the 2020 census, its population was 106.

== History ==
It was named after Athelstaneford, Scotland, when Robert Hamilton, an early settler, selected the name for the post office.

== Geography ==
Athelstane Township covers an area of 36.07 square miles (93.4 km^{2}) and contains no incorporated settlements. According to the USGS, it contains one cemetery, Athelstane.

The streams of Badger Creek, Basket Creek, and McMurray Creek run through this township.
