= Richland Township, Ottawa County, Kansas =

Township in Ottawa County, Kansas, U.S.

Richland Township
- Township
- Location within Ottawa County
- Coordinates: 39.087106°N 97.535868°W
- Country: United States
- State: Kansas
- County: Ottawa

Area
  - Total: 35.817 sq mi (92.77 km^{2})
  - Land: 35.651 sq mi (92.34 km^{2})
  - Water: 0.166 sq mi (0.43 km^{2}) 0.46%
- Elevation: 1,352 ft (412 m)

Population (2020)
  - Total: 207
  - Density: 5.81/sq mi (2.24/km^{2})
- Time zone: UTC-6 (CST)
  - Summer (DST): UTC-5 (CDT)
- Area code: 785
- GNIS feature ID: 476288

Richland Township is a township in Ottawa County, Kansas, United States. As of the 2020 census, its population was 207.

== Geography ==
Richland Township covers an area of 35.817 square miles (92.77 square kilometers).

=== Adjacent townships ===
- Grant Township, Ottawa County (north)
- Durham Township, Ottawa County (northeast)
- Ottawa Township, Ottawa County (east)
- Lincoln Township, Ottawa County (southeast)
- Buckeye Township, Ottawa County (south)
- Bennington Township, Ottawa County (southwest)
- Concord Township, Ottawa County (west)
- Blaine Township, Ottawa County (northwest)

== Transportation ==
=== Major highways ===
- K-106
