= Garfield Township, Clay County, Kansas =

Garfield Township
- Township
- Location in Clay County
- Coordinates: 39°31′40″N 097°09′01″W
- Country: United States
- State: Kansas
- County: Clay

Area
  - Total: 35.24 sq mi (91.28 km^{2})
  - Land: 35.22 sq mi (91.23 km^{2})
  - Water: 0.019 sq mi (0.05 km^{2}) 0.05%
- Elevation: 1,325 ft (404 m)

Population (2020)
  - Total: 91
  - Density: 2.6/sq mi (1.0/km^{2})
- GNIS feature ID: 0473364

Garfield Township is a township in Clay County, Kansas, United States. As of the 2020 census, its population was 91.

== Geography ==
Garfield Township covers an area of 35.24 square miles (91.3 km^{2}) and contains no incorporated settlements. According to the USGS, it contains one cemetery, Center Mission.
