= Mulberry Township, Clay County, Kansas =

Mulberry Township
- Township
- Location in Clay County
- Coordinates: 39°31′35″N 097°18′36″W
- Country: United States
- State: Kansas
- County: Clay

Area
  - Total: 38.31 sq mi (99.23 km^{2})
  - Land: 37.55 sq mi (97.25 km^{2})
  - Water: 0.76 sq mi (1.98 km^{2}) 2%
- Elevation: 1,300 ft (400 m)

Population (2020)
  - Total: 278
  - Density: 7.40/sq mi (2.86/km^{2})
- GNIS feature ID: 0472568

Mulberry Township is a township in Clay County, Kansas, United States. As of the 2020 census, its population was 278.

== Geography ==
Mulberry Township covers an area of 38.31 square miles (99.2 km^{2}) and contains no incorporated settlements. According to the USGS, it contains one cemetery, Riverdale.

The streams of Dry Creek, Mud Creek, Parsons Creek and Scribner Creek run through this township.
