= Union Township, Clay County, Kansas =

Union Township
- Township
- Location in Clay County
- Coordinates: 39°16′00″N 097°05′31″W
- Country: United States
- State: Kansas
- County: Clay

Area
  - Total: 35.61 sq mi (92.22 km^{2})
  - Land: 35.47 sq mi (91.86 km^{2})
  - Water: 0.14 sq mi (0.35 km^{2}) 0.38%
- Elevation: 1,296 ft (395 m)

Population (2020)
  - Total: 128
  - Density: 3.61/sq mi (1.39/km^{2})
- GNIS feature ID: 0476186

Union Township is a township in Clay County, Kansas, United States. As of the 2020 census, its population was 128.

== Geography ==
Union Township covers an area of 35.6 square miles (92 km^{2}) and contains no incorporated settlements. According to the USGS, it contains one cemetery, Gilbert.
