= Goshen Township, Kansas =

Goshen Township
- Township
- Location in Clay County
- Coordinates: 39°31′36″N 097°01′51″W
- Country: United States
- State: Kansas
- County: Clay

Area
  - Total: 35.2 sq mi (91.1 km^{2})
  - Land: 35.2 sq mi (91.1 km^{2})
  - Water: 0 sq mi (0 km^{2}) 0%
- Elevation: 1,289 ft (393 m)

Population (2020)
  - Total: 41
  - Density: 1.2/sq mi (0.45/km^{2})
- GNIS feature ID: 0473369

Goshen Township is a township in Clay County, Kansas, United States. As of the 2020 census, its population was 41.

== Geography ==
Goshen Township covers an area of 35.17 square miles (91.1 km^{2}) and contains no incorporated settlements. According to the USGS, it contains two cemeteries: Appleton and Central.

The streams of Carter Creek and Deadman Creek run through this township.
