= Clay Center Township, Kansas =

Clay Center Township
- Township
- Location in Clay County
- Coordinates: 39°22′00″N 097°07′01″W
- Country: United States
- State: Kansas
- County: Clay

Area
  - Total: 38.31 sq mi (99.23 km^{2})
  - Land: 37.75 sq mi (97.78 km^{2})
  - Water: 0.56 sq mi (1.45 km^{2}) 1.46%
- Elevation: 1,191 ft (363 m)

Population (2020)
  - Total: 384
  - Density: 10.2/sq mi (3.93/km^{2})
- GNIS feature ID: 0476026

Clay Center Township is a township in Clay County, Kansas, United States. As of the 2020 census, its population was 384.

== Geography ==
Clay Center Township covers an area of 38.31 square miles (99.2 km^{2}) and contains one incorporated settlement, Clay Center (the county seat). According to the USGS, it contains one cemetery, Broughton.

The streams of Dry Creek, Finney Creek, Lincoln Creek and Spring Creek run through this township.

== Transportation ==
Clay Center Township contains one airport or landing strip, Clay Center Municipal Airport.
