= Blaine Township, Ottawa County, Kansas =

Township in Ottawa County, Kansas, U.S.

Blaine Township
- Township
- Location within Ottawa County
- Coordinates: 39.168596°N 97.646173°W
- Country: United States
- State: Kansas
- County: Ottawa

Area
  - Total: 36.206 sq mi (93.77 km^{2})
  - Land: 36.196 sq mi (93.75 km^{2})
  - Water: 0.01 sq mi (0.026 km^{2}) 0.03%
- Elevation: 1,326 ft (404 m)

Population (2020)
  - Total: 95
  - Density: 2.6/sq mi (1.0/km^{2})
- Time zone: UTC-6 (CST)
  - Summer (DST): UTC-5 (CDT)
- Area code: 785
- GNIS feature ID: 476283

Blaine Township is a township in Ottawa County, Kansas, United States. As of the 2020 census, its population was 95.

== Geography ==
Blaine Township covers an area of 36.206 square miles (93.77 square kilometers).

=== Adjacent townships ===
- Logan Township, Ottawa County (north)
- Sherman Township, Ottawa County (northeast)
- Grant Township, Ottawa County (east)
- Richland Township, Ottawa County (southeast)
- Concord Township, Ottawa County (south)
- Garfield Township, Ottawa County (west)
- Sheridan Township, Ottawa County (northwest)

== Transportation ==
=== Major highways ===
- US-81
