= Clay County, Kansas =

County in Kansas, United States

- County
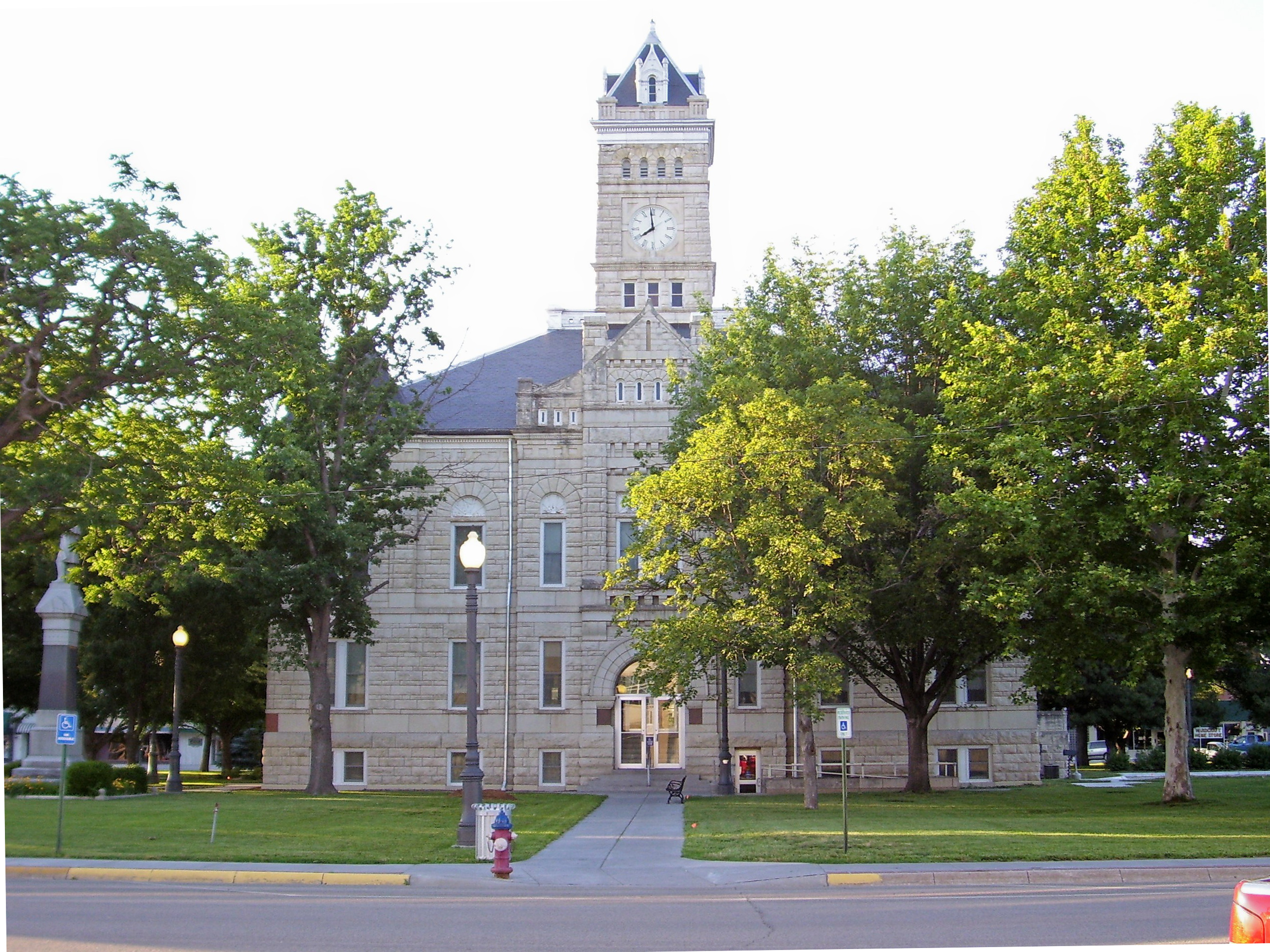
- Clay County Courthouse in Clay Center (2006)

- Location within the U.S. state of Kansas
- Country: United States
- State: Kansas
- Founded: February 20, 1857
- Named for: Henry Clay
- Seat: Clay Center
- Largest city: Clay Center

Area
  - Total: 656 sq mi (1,700 km^{2})
  - Land: 645 sq mi (1,670 km^{2})
  - Water: 10 sq mi (26 km^{2}) 1.6%

Population (2020)
  - Total: 8,117
  - Estimate (2025): 7,990 ▼
  - Density: 12.6/sq mi (4.9/km^{2})
- Time zone: UTC−6 (Central)
  - Summer (DST): UTC−5 (CDT)
- Area code: 785
- Congressional district: 1st
- Website: ClayCountyKansas.org

Clay County is a county located in the U.S. state of Kansas. Its county seat and most populous city is Clay Center. As of the 2020 United States census, the county population was 8,117. The county was named for Henry Clay, an influential U.S. Senator from Kentucky.

== History ==
=== Early history ===
For many millennia, the Great Plains of North America were inhabited by nomadic Native Americans. From the 16th century to 18th century, the Kingdom of France claimed ownership of large parts of North America. In 1762, after the French and Indian War, France secretly ceded New France to Spain, per the Treaty of Fontainebleau.

=== 19th century ===
In 1802, Spain returned most of the land to France, but keeping title to about 7,500 square miles. In 1803, most of the land for modern day Kansas was acquired by the United States from France as part of the 828,000 square mile Louisiana Purchase for 2.83 cents per acre.

In 1854, the Kansas Territory was organized, then in 1861 Kansas became the 34th U.S. state. In 1857, Clay County was established.

When the first counties were created by the Kansas legislature in 1855, the territory within the present limits of the county was attached to Riley County for all revenue and judicial purposes. Subsequently, Clay was attached to Geary County. In 1857, Clay was created and named in honor of the famous American statesman Henry Clay, a member of the United States Senate from Kentucky and United States Secretary of State in the 19th century.

In 1887, the Atchison, Topeka and Santa Fe Railway built a branch line from Neva (3 miles west of Strong City) to Superior, Nebraska. This branch line connected Strong City, Neva, Rockland, Diamond Springs, Burdick, Lost Springs, Jacobs, Hope, Navarre, Enterprise, Abilene, Talmage, Manchester, Longford, Oak Hill, Miltonvale, Aurora, Huscher, Concordia, Kackley, Courtland, Webber, Superior. At some point, the line from Neva to Lost Springs was pulled, but the right of way has not been abandoned. This branch line was originally called "Strong City and Superior line" but later the name was shortened to the "Strong City line". In 1996, the Atchison, Topeka and Santa Fe Railway merged with Burlington Northern Railroad and renamed to the current BNSF Railway. Most locals still refer to this railroad as the "Santa Fe".

=== 21st century ===
In 2010, the Keystone-Cushing Pipeline (Phase II) was constructed north to south through Clay County, with much controversy over tax exemption and environmental concerns (if a leak ever occurs). A pumping station named Riley was built along the pipeline.

== Geography ==
According to the U.S. Census Bureau, the county has a total area of 656 square miles (1,700 km^{2}), of which 645 square miles (1,670 km^{2}) is land and 10 square miles (26 km^{2}) (1.6%) is water.

=== Adjacent counties ===
- Washington County (north)
- Riley County (east)
- Geary County (southeast)
- Dickinson County (south)
- Ottawa County (southwest)
- Cloud County (west)

=== Major highways ===
Sources: National Atlas, U.S. Census Bureau

- US-24
- K-15
- K-82

== Demographics ==
Historical population
Census	Pop.	Note	%±
1860	163		—
1870	2,942		1,704.9%
1880	12,320		318.8%
1890	16,146		31.1%
1900	15,833		−1.9%
1910	15,251		−3.7%
1920	14,365		−5.8%
1930	14,556		1.3%
1940	13,281		−8.8%
1950	11,697		−11.9%
1960	10,675		−8.7%
1970	9,890		−7.4%
1980	9,802		−0.9%
1990	9,158		−6.6%
2000	8,822		−3.7%
2010	8,535		−3.3%
2020	8,117		−4.9%
2025 (est.)	7,990	▼	−1.6%
U.S. Decennial Census; 1790-1960 1900-1990; 1990-2000 2010-2020

=== Racial and ethnic composition ===
Clay County, Kansas – Racial and ethnic composition Note: the US Census treats Hispanic/Latino as an ethnic category. This table excludes Latinos from the racial categories and assigns them to a separate category. Hispanics/Latinos may be of any race.
Race / Ethnicity (NH = Non-Hispanic)	Pop 1980	Pop 1990	Pop 2000	Pop 2010	Pop 2020	% 1980	% 1990	% 2000	% 2010	% 2020
White alone (NH)	9,716	9,056	8,577	8,184	7,486	99.12%	98.89%	97.22%	95.89%	92.23%
Black or African American alone (NH)	21	18	50	34	50	0.21%	0.20%	0.57%	0.40%	0.62%
Native American or Alaska Native alone (NH)	10	16	34	32	34	0.10%	0.17%	0.39%	0.37%	0.42%
Asian alone (NH)	12	27	12	26	49	0.12%	0.29%	0.14%	0.30%	0.60%
Native Hawaiian or Pacific Islander alone (NH)	x	x	0	2	0	x	x	0.00%	0.02%	0.00%
Other race alone (NH)	0	3	2	2	10	0.00%	0.03%	0.02%	0.02%	0.12%
Mixed race or Multiracial (NH)	x	x	74	93	270	x	x	0.84%	1.09%	3.33%
Hispanic or Latino (any race)	43	38	73	162	218	0.44%	0.41%	0.83%	1.90%	2.69%
Total	9,802	9,158	8,822	8,535	8,117	100.00%	100.00%	100.00%	100.00%	100.00%

=== 2020 census ===
As of the 2020 census, the county had a population of 8,117. The median age was 44.6 years. 22.9% of residents were under the age of 18 and 23.9% of residents were 65 years of age or older. For every 100 females there were 98.7 males, and for every 100 females age 18 and over there were 98.2 males age 18 and over. 50.9% of residents lived in urban areas, while 49.1% lived in rural areas.

The racial makeup of the county was 92.9% White, 0.6% Black or African American, 0.6% American Indian and Alaska Native, 0.7% Asian, 0.0% Native Hawaiian and Pacific Islander, 0.8% from some other race, and 4.4% from two or more races. Hispanic or Latino residents of any race comprised 2.7% of the population.

There were 3,388 households in the county, of which 27.7% had children under the age of 18 living with them and 21.5% had a female householder with no spouse or partner present. About 29.5% of all households were made up of individuals and 15.5% had someone living alone who was 65 years of age or older.

There were 3,933 housing units, of which 13.9% were vacant. Among occupied housing units, 75.5% were owner-occupied and 24.5% were renter-occupied. The homeowner vacancy rate was 3.1% and the rental vacancy rate was 18.0%.

=== 2000 census ===
As of the 2000 census, there were 8,822 people, 3,617 households, and 2,517 families residing in the county. The population density was 14 people per square mile (5.4 people/km^{2}). There were 4,084 housing units at an average density of 6 per square mile (2.3/km^{2}). The racial makeup of the county was 97.72% White, 0.57% Black or African American, 0.41% Native American, 0.15% Asian, 0.26% from other races, and 0.90% from two or more races. Hispanic or Latino people of any race were 0.83% of the population.

There were 3,617 households, out of which 30.50% had children under the age of 18 living with them, 59.90% were married couples living together, 6.10% had a female householder with no husband present, and 30.40% were non-families. 27.70% of all households were made up of individuals, and 15.40% had someone living alone who was 65 years of age or older. The average household size was 2.39 and the average family size was 2.91.

In the county, the population was spread out, with 24.90% under the age of 18, 6.70% from 18 to 24, 23.90% from 25 to 44, 23.70% from 45 to 64, and 20.80% who were 65 years of age or older. The median age was 41 years. For every 100 females there were 99.10 males. For every 100 females age 18 and over, there were 95.60 males.

The median income for a household in the county was $33,965, and the median income for a family was $41,103. Males had a median income of $28,817 versus $17,760 for females. The per capita income for the county was $17,939. About 6.80% of families and 10.10% of the population were below the poverty line, including 14.60% of those under age 18 and 8.60% of those age 65 or over.

== Government ==
=== Presidential elections ===
Presidential election results

United States presidential election results for Clay County, Kansas
Year	Republican		Democratic		Third party(ies)	
Year	No.	%	No.	%	No.	%
1888	1,914	50.80%	920	24.42%	934	24.79%
1892	1,666	43.67%	0	0.00%	2,149	56.33%
1896	1,655	45.55%	1,929	53.10%	49	1.35%
1900	2,001	51.47%	1,826	46.97%	61	1.57%
1904	2,262	68.57%	403	12.22%	634	19.22%
1908	1,858	52.96%	1,495	42.62%	155	4.42%
1912	843	22.69%	1,373	36.96%	1,499	40.35%
1916	2,692	47.70%	2,632	46.63%	320	5.67%
1920	3,521	72.69%	1,155	23.84%	168	3.47%
1924	3,767	62.93%	1,417	23.67%	802	13.40%
1928	4,457	73.74%	1,515	25.07%	72	1.19%
1932	3,115	47.26%	3,289	49.90%	187	2.84%
1936	3,525	50.45%	3,441	49.25%	21	0.30%
1940	4,699	68.74%	2,067	30.24%	70	1.02%
1944	4,101	74.01%	1,391	25.10%	49	0.88%
1948	3,763	65.89%	1,804	31.59%	144	2.52%
1952	5,059	84.87%	831	13.94%	71	1.19%
1956	4,378	80.17%	1,034	18.93%	49	0.90%
1960	3,937	75.33%	1,246	23.84%	43	0.82%
1964	3,030	62.18%	1,806	37.06%	37	0.76%
1968	3,335	71.95%	926	19.98%	374	8.07%
1972	3,562	78.42%	887	19.53%	93	2.05%
1976	3,085	63.85%	1,610	33.32%	137	2.84%
1980	3,449	73.90%	932	19.97%	286	6.13%
1984	3,559	78.76%	919	20.34%	41	0.91%
1988	2,997	72.10%	1,112	26.75%	48	1.15%
1992	2,198	47.89%	947	20.63%	1,445	31.48%
1996	2,793	66.87%	963	23.05%	421	10.08%
2000	2,998	73.34%	951	23.26%	139	3.40%
2004	3,174	79.15%	793	19.78%	43	1.07%
2008	2,998	73.95%	1,009	24.89%	47	1.16%
2012	2,788	75.64%	834	22.63%	64	1.74%
2016	2,891	75.68%	677	17.72%	252	6.60%
2020	3,177	75.97%	894	21.38%	111	2.65%
2024	3,150	76.59%	867	21.08%	96	2.33%

Like all of Kansas outside the eastern cities, Clay County is overwhelmingly Republican. When Lyndon B. Johnson became in 1964 the last Democrat to carry the state's electoral votes, Clay County was his weakest in the state, giving over 62 percent of its votes to Barry Goldwater. The solitary Democrat to win a majority of Clay County's votes has been William Jennings Bryan in 1896, although Woodrow Wilson in a four-way race in 1912, and Franklin D. Roosevelt in 1932 both obtained slim pluralities. Roosevelt in 1936, when he lost to Kansan Alf Landon by eighty-four votes, remains the last Democrat to win forty percent of the county's vote, and Jimmy Carter in 1976 is the last to pass thirty percent.

== Education ==
Unified school districts that serve portions of the county include:

- Clay County USD 379
- Clifton-Clyde USD 224
- Southern Cloud USD 334

== Communities ==
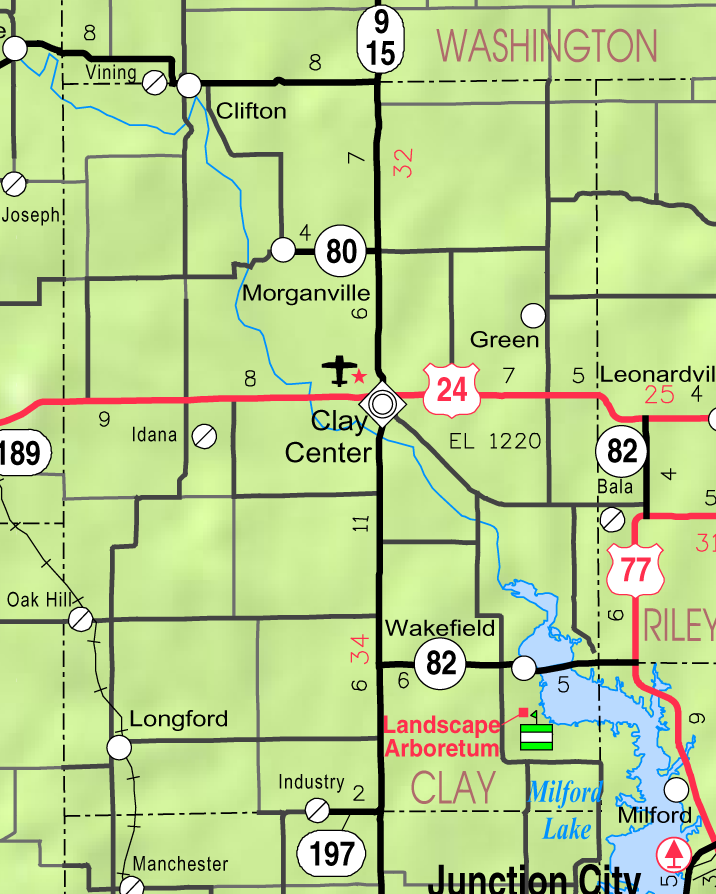
2005 map of Clay County (map legend)

List of townships / incorporated cities / unincorporated communities / extinct former communities within Clay County.

=== Cities ===
‡ means a community has portions in an adjacent county.

- Clay Center (county seat)
- Wakefield
- Clifton‡
- Morganville
- Green
- Longford
- Vining‡
- Oak Hill

=== Unincorporated communities ===
† means a community is designated a Census-Designated Place (CDP) by the United States Census Bureau.

- Idana†
- Industry‡
- Ladysmith

=== Ghost towns ===
- Broughton
- Browndale
- Athelstane
- Bateham
- Broughton, razed when Milford Lake was built
- Browndale
- Exeter
- Fact
- Fancy Creek
- Garfield Center
- Gatesville
- Northern
- Republican City
- Lovejoy
- Powellsburgh
- Delavan
- Riverdale
- Uniondale
- Stitt
- Chapmanville
- Wilson
- Hebron
- Lund
- Peach Grove
- Mulberry
- Morgan City
- Madura
- Fayetteville
- Otter Creek
- Mount Pleasant
- Fancy Creek
- Oberg
- Carter Creek
- Tabor
- Morena
- Bachelder
- Lima
- Iwacura

=== Townships ===
Clay County is divided into eighteen townships. The city of Clay Center is considered governmentally independent and is excluded from the census figures for the townships. In the following table, the population center is the largest city (or cities) included in that township's population total, if it is of a significant size.

Township	FIPS	Population center	Population	Population density /km^{2} (/sq mi)	Land area km^{2} (sq mi)	Water area km^{2} (sq mi)	Water %	Geographic coordinates
Athelstane	02950		144	2 (4)	93 (36)	0 (0)	0.03%	39°10′17″N 97°12′35″W
Blaine	07050		259	2 (6)	109 (42)	1 (0)	0.94%	39°20′38″N 97°11′11″W
Bloom	07325		125	1 (3)	122 (47)	1 (0)	0.53%	39°26′29″N 97°16′51″W
Chapman	12525	Longford	202	2 (6)	93 (36)	0 (0)	0.09%	39°10′21″N 97°19′35″W
Clay Center	13650		368	4 (10)	98 (38)	1 (1)	1.46%	39°21′30″N 97°6′17″W
Exeter	22100		81	1 (2)	94 (36)	0 (0)	0.08%	39°15′24″N 97°11′36″W
Five Creeks	23475		159	2 (4)	93 (36)	0 (0)	0.04%	39°21′22″N 97°18′14″W
Garfield	25500		107	1 (3)	91 (35)	0 (0)	0.05%	39°31′55″N 97°7′5″W
Gill	26250		140	2 (5)	78 (30)	0 (0)	0.04%	39°10′10″N 97°6′3″W
Goshen	27025		92	1 (3)	91 (35)	0 (0)	0%	39°31′4″N 97°0′14″W
Grant	27500		132	2 (5)	74 (29)	13 (5)	14.83%	39°16′12″N 96°59′27″W
Hayes	30875		206	2 (6)	92 (36)	0 (0)	0%	39°26′9″N 97°5′58″W
Highland	31825	Green	310	3 (9)	92 (35)	0 (0)	0.07%	39°25′28″N 97°0′1″W
Mulberry	49000	Clifton (part)	331	3 (9)	97 (38)	2 (1)	1.99%	39°32′19″N 97°16′23″W
Oakland	51725		110	1 (3)	93 (36)	0 (0)	0%	39°15′30″N 97°20′21″W
Republican	59025	Wakefield	1,024	14 (36)	73 (28)	10 (4)	12.46%	39°12′7″N 97°0′50″W
Sherman	64850	Morganville	328	4 (10)	85 (33)	1 (0)	1.00%	39°30′15″N 97°12′42″W
Union	72075		140	2 (4)	92 (35)	0 (0)	0.38%	39°16′16″N 97°4′53″W
Sources: "Census 2000 U.S. Gazetteer Files". U.S. Census Bureau, Geography Division. Archived from the original on August 2, 2002.

== Notable people ==
See List of people from Clay County, Kansas

Two former Kansas Governors resided in Clay County. George Docking was the 35th Governor, serving from January 14, 1957, until January 9, 1961. William H. Avery was the 37th Governor, from January 11, 1965, until January 9, 1967.

== See also ==
- Dry counties

Community information for Kansas

- Kansas locations by per capita income
- List of counties in Kansas
- List of townships in Kansas
- List of cities in Kansas
- List of unincorporated communities in Kansas
- List of ghost towns in Kansas
