= Green, Kansas =

City in Clay County, Kansas

- City
- Location within Clay County and Kansas

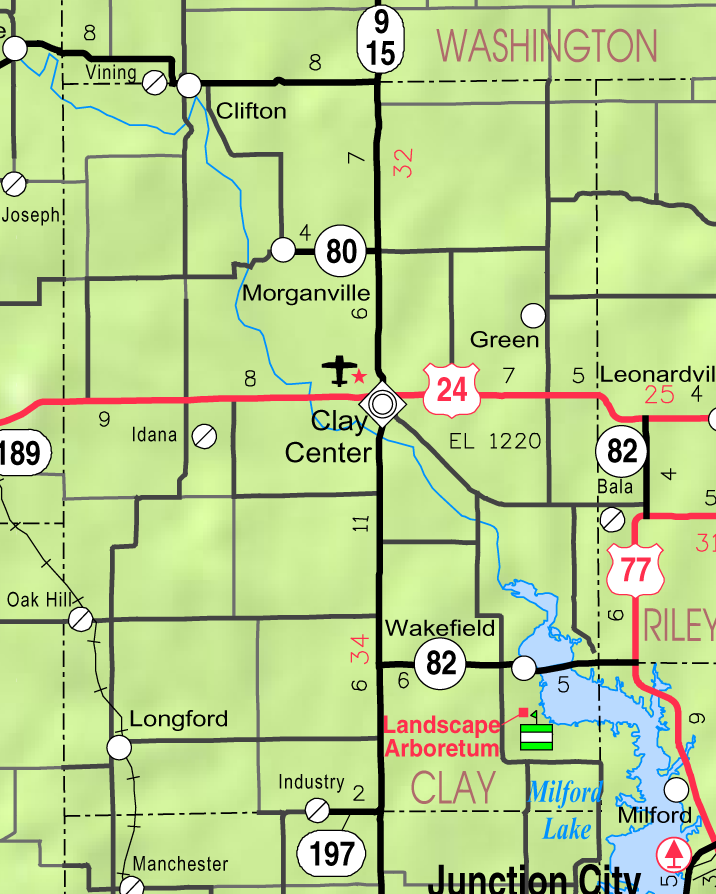
- KDOT map of Clay County (legend)
- Coordinates: 39°25′48″N 97°00′00″W
- Country: United States
- State: Kansas
- County: Clay
- Incorporated: 1908
- Named for: Nehemiah Green

Area
  - Total: 0.20 sq mi (0.51 km^{2})
  - Land: 0.20 sq mi (0.51 km^{2})
  - Water: 0 sq mi (0.00 km^{2})
- Elevation: 1,391 ft (424 m)

Population (2020)
  - Total: 95
  - Density: 480/sq mi (190/km^{2})
- Time zone: UTC-6 (CST)
  - Summer (DST): UTC-5 (CDT)
- ZIP Code: 67447
- Area code: 785
- FIPS code: 20-28425
- GNIS ID: 2394974

Green is a city in Clay County, Kansas, United States. As of the 2020 census, the population of the city was 95.

== History ==
A post office was opened in Powellsburgh (an extinct town) in 1872, but it was moved to Green in 1881.

Green was incorporated in 1908. It is named in honor of the fourth Governor of Kansas, Nehemiah Green, who offered to donate a church bell to the town in exchange for the naming rights.

Green was a shipping point on the Union Pacific Railroad.

== Geography ==
According to the United States Census Bureau, the city has a total area of 0.20 square miles (0.52 km^{2}), all land.

== Demographics ==
Historical population
Census	Pop.	Note	%±
1910	289		—
1920	297		2.8%
1930	293		−1.3%
1940	246		−16.0%
1950	219		−11.0%
1960	190		−13.2%
1970	163		−14.2%
1980	155		−4.9%
1990	150		−3.2%
2000	147		−2.0%
2010	128		−12.9%
2020	95		−25.8%
U.S. Decennial Census

=== 2020 census ===
The 2020 United States census counted 95 people, 43 households, and 31 families in Green. The population density was 487.2 per square mile (188.1/km^{2}). There were 53 housing units at an average density of 271.8 per square mile (104.9/km^{2}). The racial makeup was 97.89% (93) white or European American (97.89% non-Hispanic white), 0.0% (0) black or African-American, 1.05% (1) Native American or Alaska Native, 0.0% (0) Asian, 0.0% (0) Pacific Islander or Native Hawaiian, 1.05% (1) from other races, and 0.0% (0) from two or more races. Hispanic or Latino of any race was 1.05% (1) of the population.

Of the 43 households, 44.2% had children under the age of 18; 53.5% were married couples living together; 20.9% had a female householder with no spouse or partner present. 23.3% of households consisted of individuals and 11.6% had someone living alone who was 65 years of age or older. The average household size was 3.0 and the average family size was 3.4. The percent of those with a bachelor's degree or higher was estimated to be 23.2% of the population.

18.9% of the population was under the age of 18, 9.5% from 18 to 24, 21.1% from 25 to 44, 28.4% from 45 to 64, and 22.1% who were 65 years of age or older. The median age was 45.2 years. For every 100 females, there were 111.1 males. For every 100 females ages 18 and older, there were 97.4 males.

The 2016–2020 5-year American Community Survey estimates show that the median household income was $65,481 (with a margin of error of +/- $21,296) and the median family income was $66,442 (+/- $1,804). Males had a median income of $47,813 (+/- $25,760) versus $26,786 (+/- $16,562) for females. The median income for those above 16 years old was $32,500 (+/- $14,303). Approximately, 5.1% of families and 5.5% of the population were below the poverty line, including 8.3% of those under the age of 18 and 0.0% of those ages 65 or over.

=== 2010 census ===
As of the census of 2010, there were 128 people, 54 households, and 34 families residing in the city. The population density was 640.0 inhabitants per square mile (247.1/km^{2}). There were 68 housing units at an average density of 340.0 per square mile (131.3/km^{2}). The racial makeup of the city was 97.7% White, 1.6% Native American, and 0.8% from two or more races. Hispanic or Latino people of any race were 2.3% of the population.

There were 54 households, of which 31.5% had children under the age of 18 living with them, 48.1% were married couples living together, 7.4% had a female householder with no husband present, 7.4% had a male householder with no wife present, and 37.0% were non-families. 31.5% of all households were made up of individuals, and 16.7% had someone living alone who was 65 years of age or older. The average household size was 2.37 and the average family size was 3.03.

The median age in the city was 36.6 years. 28.1% of residents were under the age of 18; 3% were between the ages of 18 and 24; 29% were from 25 to 44; 27.3% were from 45 to 64; and 12.5% were 65 years of age or older. The gender makeup of the city was 50.0% male and 50.0% female.

=== 2000 census ===
As of the census of 2000, there were 147 people, 58 households, and 41 families residing in the city. The population density was 752.8 inhabitants per square mile (290.7/km^{2}). There were 71 housing units at an average density of 363.6 per square mile (140.4/km^{2}). The racial makeup of the city was 96.60% White, 0.68% African American and 2.72% Native American. Hispanic or Latino people of any race were 1.36% of the population.

There were 58 households, out of which 41.4% had children under the age of 18 living with them, 50.0% were married couples living together, 13.8% had a female householder with no husband present, and 29.3% were non-families. 24.1% of all households were made up of individuals, and 10.3% had someone living alone who was 65 years of age or older. The average household size was 2.53 and the average family size was 3.05.

In the city, the population was spread out, with 34.0% under the age of 18, 8.2% from 18 to 24, 29.3% from 25 to 44, 19.0% from 45 to 64, and 9.5% who were 65 years of age or older. The median age was 30 years. For every 100 females, there were 96.0 males. For every 100 females age 18 and over, there were 98.0 males.

The median income for a household in the city was $27,083, and the median income for a family was $29,167. Males had a median income of $21,750 versus $27,500 for females. The per capita income for the city was $11,171. 5.3% of families and 4.4% of the population were living below the poverty line, including 5.6% of those under eighteen and none of those over 64.

== Education ==
The community is served by Clay County USD 379 public school district.

== Gallery ==
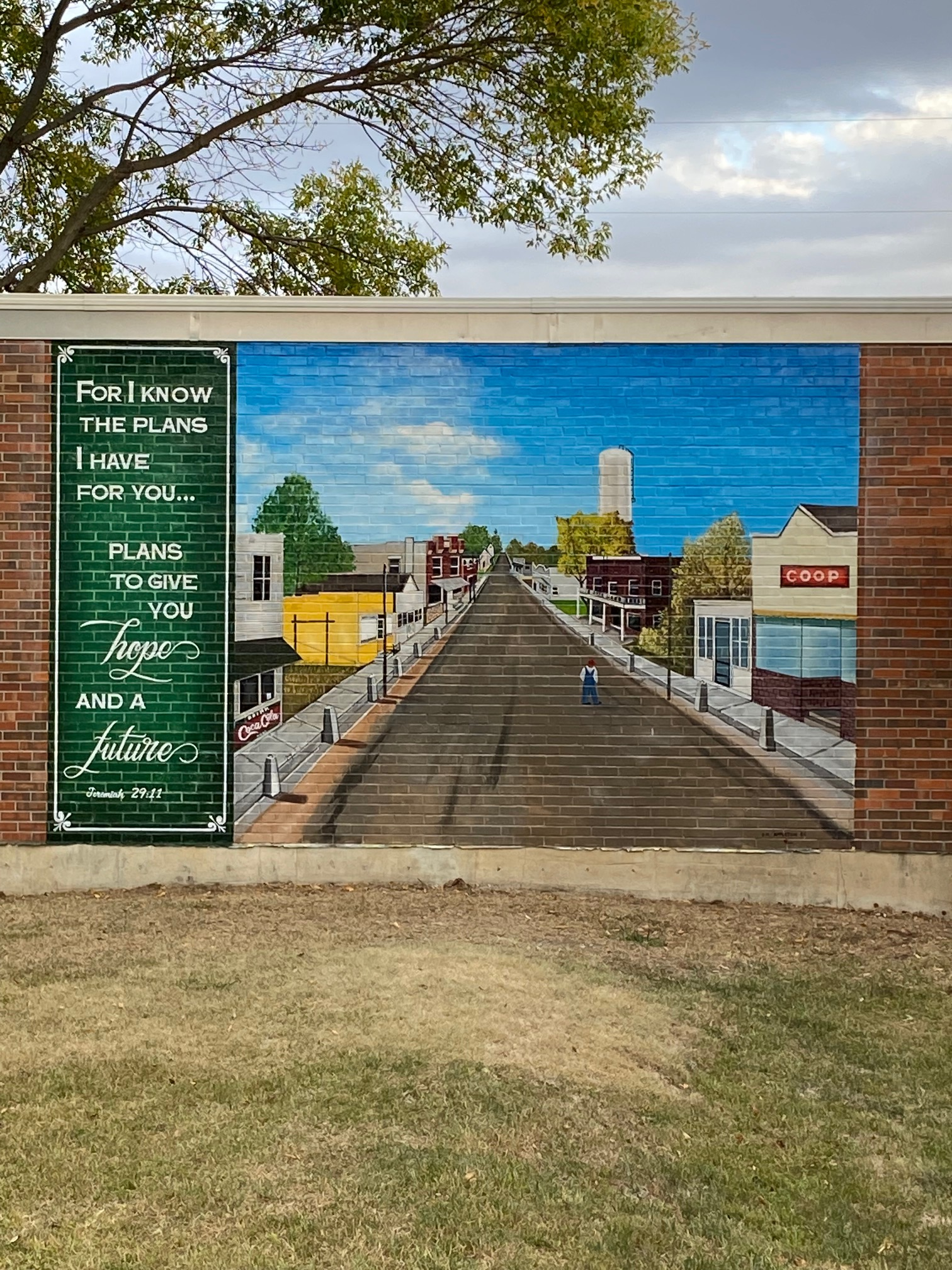
Green 1950 (2021)
