= Five Creeks Township, Kansas =

Five Creeks Township
- Township
- Location in Clay County
- Coordinates: 39°21′50″N 097°18′31″W
- Country: United States
- State: Kansas
- County: Clay

Area
  - Total: 35.99 sq mi (93.21 km^{2})
  - Land: 35.97 sq mi (93.17 km^{2})
  - Water: 0.015 sq mi (0.04 km^{2}) 0.04%
- Elevation: 1,289 ft (393 m)

Population (2020)
  - Total: 118
  - Density: 3.28/sq mi (1.27/km^{2})
- GNIS feature ID: 0476017

Five Creeks Township is a township in Clay County, Kansas, United States. As of the 2020 census, its population was 118.

== Geography ==
Five Creeks Township covers an area of 35.99 square miles (93.2 km^{2}) and contains no incorporated settlements. According to the USGS, it contains one cemetery, Shields.

The stream of Pinkerton Branch runs through this township.
