= Gill Township, Kansas =

Gill Township
- Township
- Location within Clay County

- Location within the state of Kansas
- Coordinates: 39°10′30″N 097°06′31″W
- Country: United States
- State: Kansas
- County: Clay

Area
  - Total: 30.09 sq mi (77.93 km^{2})
  - Land: 30.07 sq mi (77.89 km^{2})
  - Water: 0.012 sq mi (0.03 km^{2}) 0.04%
- Elevation: 1,335 ft (407 m)

Population (2020)
  - Total: 146
  - Density: 4.85/sq mi (1.87/km^{2})
- Time zone: UTC-6 (CST)
  - Summer (DST): UTC-5 (CDT)
- FIPS code: 20-26250
- GNIS ID: 476318

Gill Township is a township in Clay County, Kansas, United States. As of the 2020 census, its population was 146.

== Geography ==
Gill Township covers an area of 30.09 square miles (77.9 km^{2}) and contains no incorporated settlements.

According to the USGS, it contains one cemetery, Saint Johns.
