= Oakland Township, Clay County, Kansas =

Oakland Township
- Township
- Location in Clay County
- Coordinates: 39°16′00″N 097°19′16″W
- Country: United States
- State: Kansas
- County: Clay

Area
  - Total: 35.86 sq mi (92.87 km^{2})
  - Land: 35.86 sq mi (92.87 km^{2})
  - Water: 0 sq mi (0 km^{2}) 0%
- Elevation: 1,335 ft (407 m)

Population (2020)
  - Total: 104
  - Density: 2.90/sq mi (1.12/km^{2})
- GNIS feature ID: 0476171

Oakland Township is a township in Clay County, Kansas, United States. As of the 2020 census, its population was 104.

== Geography ==
Oakland Township covers an area of 35.86 square miles (92.9 km^{2}) and contains one incorporated settlement, Oak Hill. According to the USGS, it contains two cemeteries: Pleasant Valley and Rose Meron.
