= Oak Hill, Kansas =

City in Clay County, Kansas

- City
- Location within Clay County and Kansas

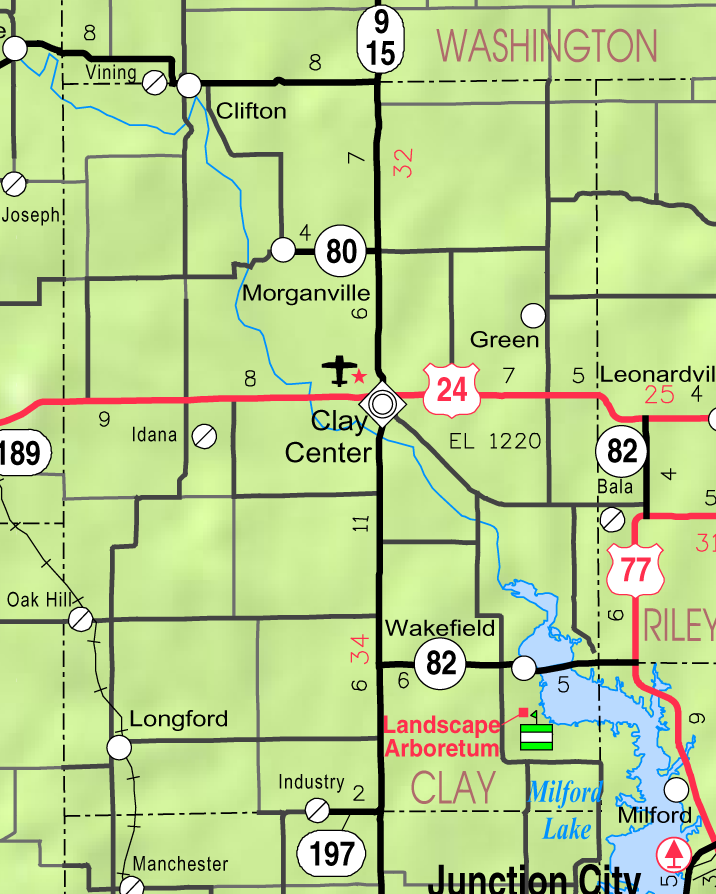
- KDOT map of Clay County (legend)
- Coordinates: 39°14′48″N 97°20′35″W
- Country: United States
- State: Kansas
- County: Clay
- Platted: 1872
- Incorporated: 1925

Area
  - Total: 0.050 sq mi (0.13 km^{2})
  - Land: 0.050 sq mi (0.13 km^{2})
  - Water: 0 sq mi (0.00 km^{2})
- Elevation: 1,289 ft (393 m)

Population (2020)
  - Total: 24
  - Density: 480/sq mi (180/km^{2})
- Time zone: UTC-6 (CST)
  - Summer (DST): UTC-5 (CDT)
- ZIP Code: 67432
- Area code: 785
- FIPS code: 20-51700
- GNIS ID: 2395284

Oak Hill is a city in Clay County, Kansas, United States. As of the 2020 census, the population of the city was 24.

== History ==
Oak Hill was laid out in 1872.

A post office was opened in 1871 in Oak Hill (also historically spelled Oakhill), and remained in operation until it was discontinued in 1995.

In 1887, Atchison, Topeka and Santa Fe Railway built a branch line from Neva (three miles west of Strong City) through Oak Hill to Superior, Nebraska. In 1996, the Atchison, Topeka and Santa Fe Railway merged with Burlington Northern Railroad and renamed to the current BNSF Railway. Most locals still refer to this railroad as the "Santa Fe".

== Geography ==
According to the United States Census Bureau, the city has a total area of 0.05 square miles (0.13 km^{2}), all land.

== Demographics ==
Historical population
Census	Pop.	Note	%±
1930	147		—
1940	147		0.0%
1950	92		−37.4%
1960	69		−25.0%
1970	41		−40.6%
1980	35		−14.6%
1990	13		−62.9%
2000	35		169.2%
2010	24		−31.4%
2020	24		0.0%
U.S. Decennial Census

=== 2010 census ===
As of the census of 2010, there were 24 people, 11 households, and 7 families living in the city. The population density was 480.0 inhabitants per square mile (185.3/km^{2}). There were 19 housing units at an average density of 380.0 per square mile (146.7/km^{2}). The racial makeup of the city was 95.8% White and 4.2% from two or more races.

There were 11 households, of which 18.2% had children under the age of 18 living with them, 54.5% were married couples living together, 9.1% had a female householder with no husband present, and 36.4% were non-families. 27.3% of all households were made up of individuals, and 18.2% had someone living alone who was 65 years of age or older. The average household size was 2.18 and the average family size was 2.71.

The median age in the city was 46 years. 12.5% of residents were under the age of 18; 0.0% were between the ages of 18 and 24; 33.4% were from 25 to 44; 37.5% were from 45 to 64; and 16.7% were 65 years of age or older. The gender makeup of the city was 50.0% male and 50.0% female.

=== 2000 census ===
As of the census of 2000, there were 35 people, 13 households, and 6 families living in the city. The population density was 729.0 inhabitants per square mile (281.5/km^{2}). There were 20 housing units at an average density of 416.6 per square mile (160.9/km^{2}). Every resident is White.

There were 13 households, out of which 23.1% had children under the age of 18 living with them, 38.5% were married couples living together, 7.7% had a female householder with no husband present, and 53.8% were non-families. 46.2% of all households were made up of individuals, and 30.8% had someone living alone who was 65 years of age or older. The average household size was 2.69 and the average family size was 4.00.

In the city, the population was spread out, with 37.1% under the age of 18, 5.7% from 18 to 24, 28.6% from 25 to 44, 11.4% from 45 to 64, and 17.1% who were 65 years of age or older. The median age was 30 years. For every 100 females, there were 105.9 males. For every 100 females age 18 and over, there were 144.4 males.

The median income for a household in the city was $29,583, and the median income for a family was $46,250. Males had a median income of $20,625 versus $38,750 for females. The per capita income for the city was $11,326. There were no families and 2.9% of the population living below the poverty line, including no under eighteens and none of those over 64.

== Education ==
The community is served by Clay County USD 379 public school district.
