= Wells, Kansas =

Unincorporated community in Ottawa County, Kansas

- Unincorporated community and CDP
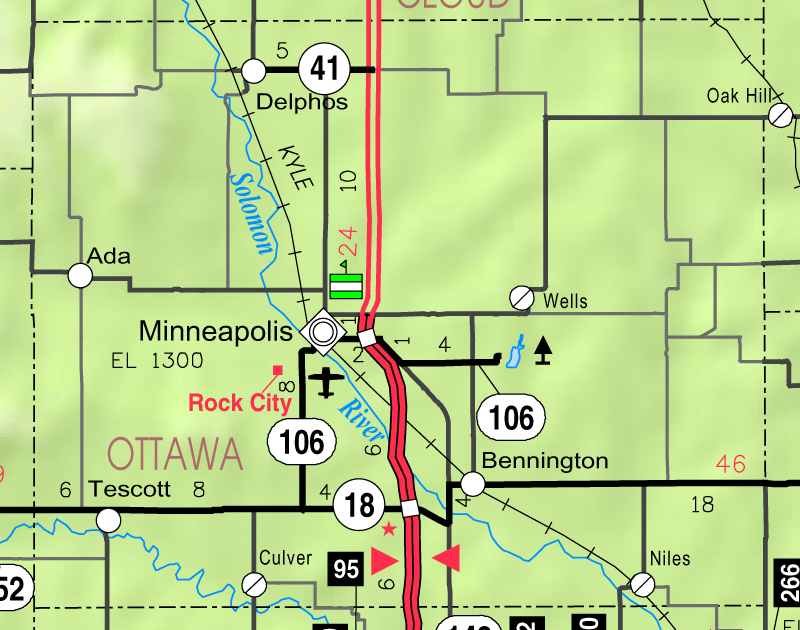
- KDOT map of Ottawa County (legend)

- Location within Kansas Location within the United States
- Coordinates: 39°08′21″N 97°33′04″W
- Country: United States
- State: Kansas
- County: Ottawa
- Elevation: 1,371 ft (418 m)

Population (2020)
  - Total: 45
- Time zone: UTC-6 (CST)
  - Summer (DST): UTC-5 (CDT)
- Area code: 785
- FIPS code: 20-76550
- GNIS ID: 2804518

Wells is an unincorporated community and census-designated place (CDP) in Ottawa County, Kansas, United States. As of the 2020 census, the population was 45. It is located approximately 6.5 miles east of U.S. Route 81 highway, next to a former railroad line.

== History ==
The first post office in Wells was established in 1888 and was called Poe until 1892. It remained in operation until it closed in 1996.

== Demographics ==
Historical population
Census	Pop.	Note	%±
2020	45		—
U.S. Decennial Census

== Education ==
The community is served by North Ottawa County USD 239 public school district.
