= Republican Township, Kansas =

Republican Township
- Township
- Location in Clay County
- Coordinates: 39°11′30″N 097°00′31″W
- Country: United States
- State: Kansas
- County: Clay

Area
  - Total: 32.26 sq mi (83.55 km^{2})
  - Land: 28.24 sq mi (73.14 km^{2})
  - Water: 4.02 sq mi (10.41 km^{2}) 12.46%
- Elevation: 1,188 ft (362 m)

Population (2020)
  - Total: 1,068
  - Density: 37.82/sq mi (14.60/km^{2})
- GNIS feature ID: 0476193

Republican Township is a township in Clay County, Kansas, United States. As of the 2020 census, its population was 1,068.

== Geography ==
Republican Township covers an area of 32.26 square miles (83.6 km^{2}) and contains one incorporated settlement, Wakefield. According to the USGS, it contains one cemetery, Madura.

The streams of Cane Creek and Quimby Creek run through this township.

== Transportation ==
Republican Township contains one airport or landing strip, Wakefield Municipal Airstrip.
