= Sherman Township, Clay County, Kansas =

Sherman Township
- Township
- Location in Clay County
- Coordinates: 39°28′30″N 097°11′21″W
- Country: United States
- State: Kansas
- County: Clay

Area
  - Total: 33.33 sq mi (86.33 km^{2})
  - Land: 33.00 sq mi (85.46 km^{2})
  - Water: 0.34 sq mi (0.87 km^{2}) 1.01%
- Elevation: 1,234 ft (376 m)

Population (2020)
  - Total: 235
  - Density: 7.12/sq mi (2.75/km^{2})
- GNIS feature ID: 0473356

Sherman Township is a township in Clay County, Kansas, United States. As of the 2020 census, its population was 235.

== Geography ==
Sherman Township covers an area of 33.33 square miles (86.3 km^{2}) and contains one incorporated settlement, Morganville. According to the USGS, it contains two cemeteries: Morganville and Sherman.

Stillwater Lake is within this township. The streams of East Branch Dry Creek and Peats Creek run through this township.
