= Longford, Kansas =

City in Clay County, Kansas

- City
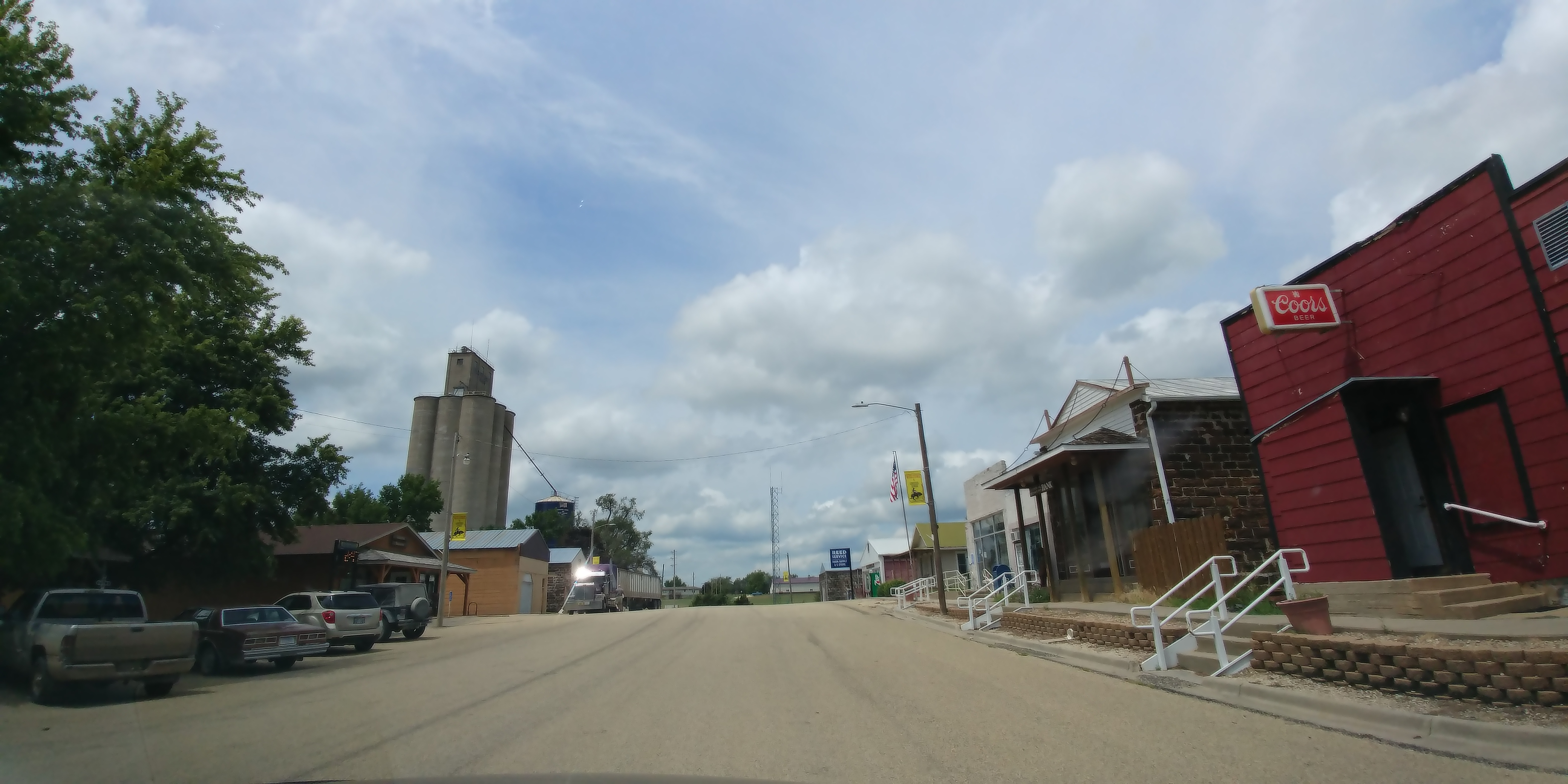
- Downtown Longford (2017)

- Location within Clay County and Kansas

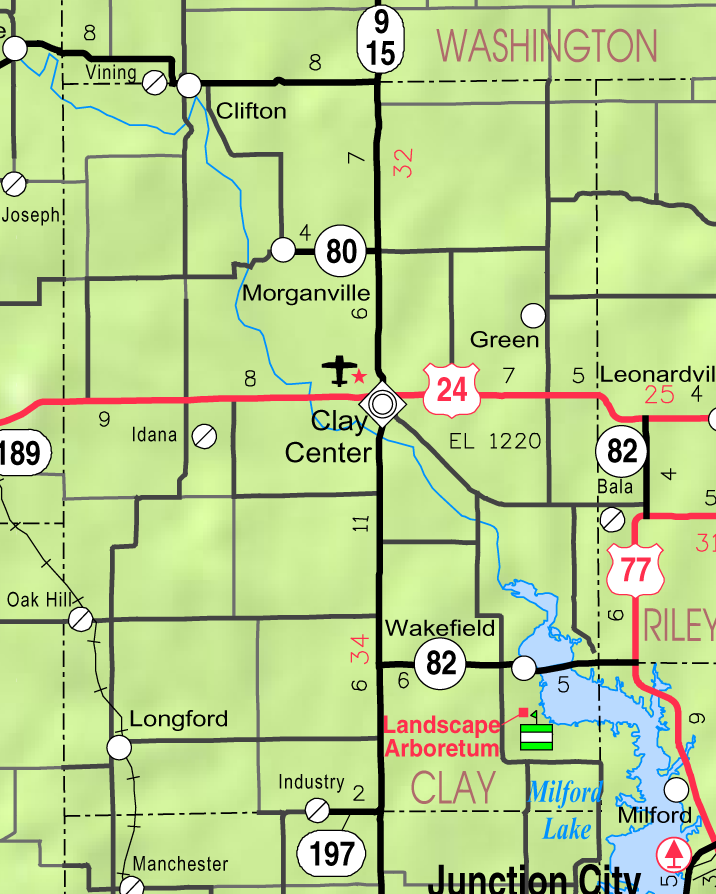
- KDOT map of Clay County (legend)
- Coordinates: 39°10′20″N 97°19′45″W
- Country: United States
- State: Kansas
- County: Clay

Area
  - Total: 0.15 sq mi (0.40 km^{2})
  - Land: 0.15 sq mi (0.40 km^{2})
  - Water: 0 sq mi (0.00 km^{2})
- Elevation: 1,362 ft (415 m)

Population (2020)
  - Total: 73
  - Density: 470/sq mi (180/km^{2})
- Time zone: UTC-6 (CST)
  - Summer (DST): UTC-5 (CDT)
- ZIP Code: 67458
- Area code: 785
- FIPS code: 20-42575
- GNIS ID: 2395759
- Website: www.longfordks.com

Longford is a city in Clay County, Kansas, United States. As of the 2020 census, the population of the city was 73.

== History ==
Longford was founded in 1870. It was named for County Longford in Ireland. The first post office in Longford was established in 1875.

In 1887, Atchison, Topeka and Santa Fe Railway built a branch line from Neva (3 mi (4.8 km) west of Strong City) through Longford to Superior, Nebraska. In 1996, the Atchison, Topeka and Santa Fe merged with Burlington Northern Railroad and was renamed to the current BNSF Railway. Most locals still refer to this railroad as the "Santa Fe".

== Geography ==
According to the United States Census Bureau, the city has a total area of 0.15 square miles (0.39 km^{2}), all land.

=== Climate ===
The climate in this area is characterized by hot, humid summers and generally mild to cool winters. According to the Köppen Climate Classification system, Longford has a humid subtropical climate, abbreviated "Cfa" on climate maps.

== Demographics ==
Historical population
Census	Pop.	Note	%±
1920	155		—
1930	200		29.0%
1940	160		−20.0%
1950	178		11.3%
1960	146		−18.0%
1970	99		−32.2%
1980	109		10.1%
1990	68		−37.6%
2000	94		38.2%
2010	79		−16.0%
2020	73		−7.6%
U.S. Decennial Census

=== 2020 census ===
The 2020 United States census counted 73 people, 39 households, and 25 families in Longford. The population density was 514.1 per square mile (198.5/km^{2}). There were 47 housing units at an average density of 331.0 per square mile (127.8/km^{2}). The racial makeup was 89.04% (65) white or European American (89.04% non-Hispanic white), 0.0% (0) black or African-American, 0.0% (0) Native American or Alaska Native, 0.0% (0) Asian, 0.0% (0) Pacific Islander or Native Hawaiian, 0.0% (0) from other races, and 10.96% (8) from two or more races. Hispanic or Latino of any race was 0.0% (0) of the population.

Of the 39 households, 48.7% had children under the age of 18; 43.6% were married couples living together; 17.9% had a female householder with no spouse or partner present. 28.2% of households consisted of individuals and 15.4% had someone living alone who was 65 years of age or older. The average household size was 2.9 and the average family size was 3.6. The percent of those with a bachelor's degree or higher was estimated to be 17.8% of the population.

21.9% of the population was under the age of 18, 11.0% from 18 to 24, 21.9% from 25 to 44, 21.9% from 45 to 64, and 23.3% who were 65 years of age or older. The median age was 44.3 years. For every 100 females, there were 78.0 males. For every 100 females ages 18 and older, there were 72.7 males.

The 2016–2020 5-year American Community Survey estimates show that the median household income was $40,938 (with a margin of error of +/- $10,248) and the median family income was $44,583 (+/- $18,683). Males had a median income of $24,375 (+/- $20,722). Approximately, 7.4% of families and 10.7% of the population were below the poverty line, including 6.1% of those under the age of 18 and 0.0% of those ages 65 or over.

=== 2010 census ===
As of the census of 2010, there were 79 people, 34 households, and 17 families living in the city. The population density was 526.7 inhabitants per square mile (203.4/km^{2}). There were 49 housing units at an average density of 326.7 per square mile (126.1/km^{2}). The racial makeup of the city was 97.5% White, 1.3% Native American, and 1.3% from two or more races. Hispanic or Latino people of any race were 6.3% of the population.

There were 34 households, of which 26.5% had children under the age of 18 living with them, 44.1% were married couples living together, 2.9% had a female householder with no husband present, 2.9% had a male householder with no wife present, and 50.0% were non-families. 41.2% of all households were made up of individuals, and 14.7% had someone living alone who was 65 years of age or older. The average household size was 2.32 and the average family size was 3.41.

The median age in the city was 39.5 years. 32.9% of residents were under the age of 18; 1.3% were between the ages of 18 and 24; 21.6% were from 25 to 44; 29.2% were from 45 to 64; and 15.2% were 65 years of age or older. The gender makeup of the city was 49.4% male and 50.6% female.

=== 2000 census ===
As of the census of 2000, there were 94 people, 41 households, and 25 families living in the city. The population density was 619.8 inhabitants per square mile (239.3/km^{2}). There were 54 housing units at an average density of 356.1 per square mile (137.5/km^{2}). The racial makeup of the city was 96.81% White, 2.13% African American, and 1.06% from two or more races.

There were 41 households, out of which 26.8% had children under the age of 18 living with them, 58.5% were married couples living together, and 36.6% were non-families. 31.7% of all households were made up of individuals, and 22.0% had someone living alone who was 65 years of age or older. The average household size was 2.29 and the average family size was 2.88.

In the city, the population was spread out, with 24.5% under the age of 18, 7.4% from 18 to 24, 27.7% from 25 to 44, 19.1% from 45 to 64, and 21.3% who were 65 years of age or older. The median age was 37 years. For every 100 females, there were 88.0 males. For every 100 females age 18 and over, there were 97.2 males.

The median income for a household in the city was $20,833, and the median income for a family was $24,375. Males had a median income of $22,500 versus $10,000 for females. The per capita income for the city was $12,072. There were 11.1% of families and 13.6% of the population living below the poverty line, including no under eighteens and 33.3% of those over 64.

== Culture ==
Longford is known for their annual PRCA-sanctioned rodeo. The Longford Rodeo started in 1955.

There is a mural paying homage to the local rodeo clowns in downtown Longford as a part of the local "Mural Movement".

== Education ==
The community is served by Clay County USD 379 public school district.

Longford schools were closed through school unification. The Longford High School mascot was Longford Lions.

== Notable people ==
- Bob Cain, baseball player, famous for pitching to Eddie Gaedel, the shortest person to appear in a Major League Baseball game

== Gallery ==
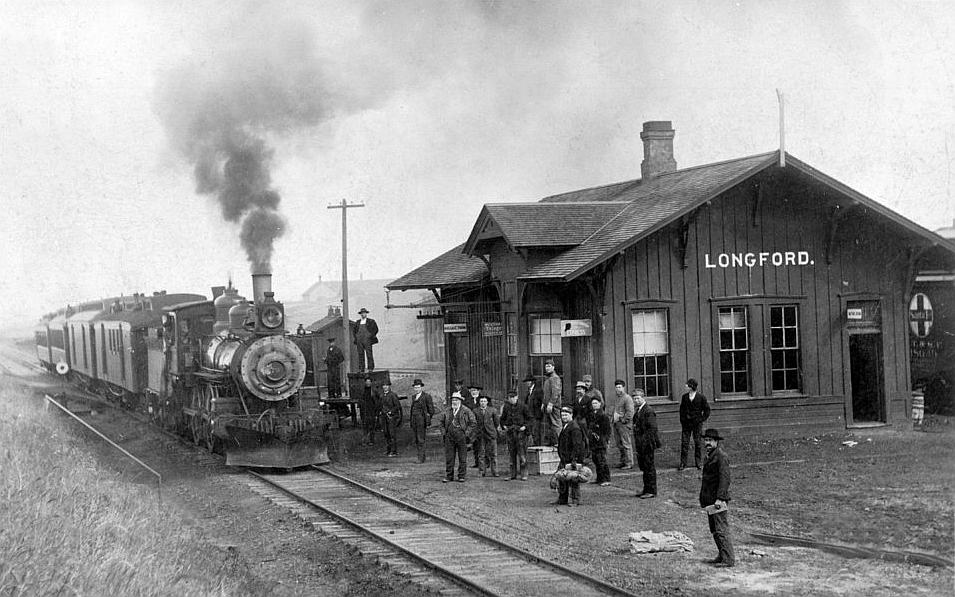
Atchison, Topeka and Santa Fe Railway depot in Longford, circa 1887-1897

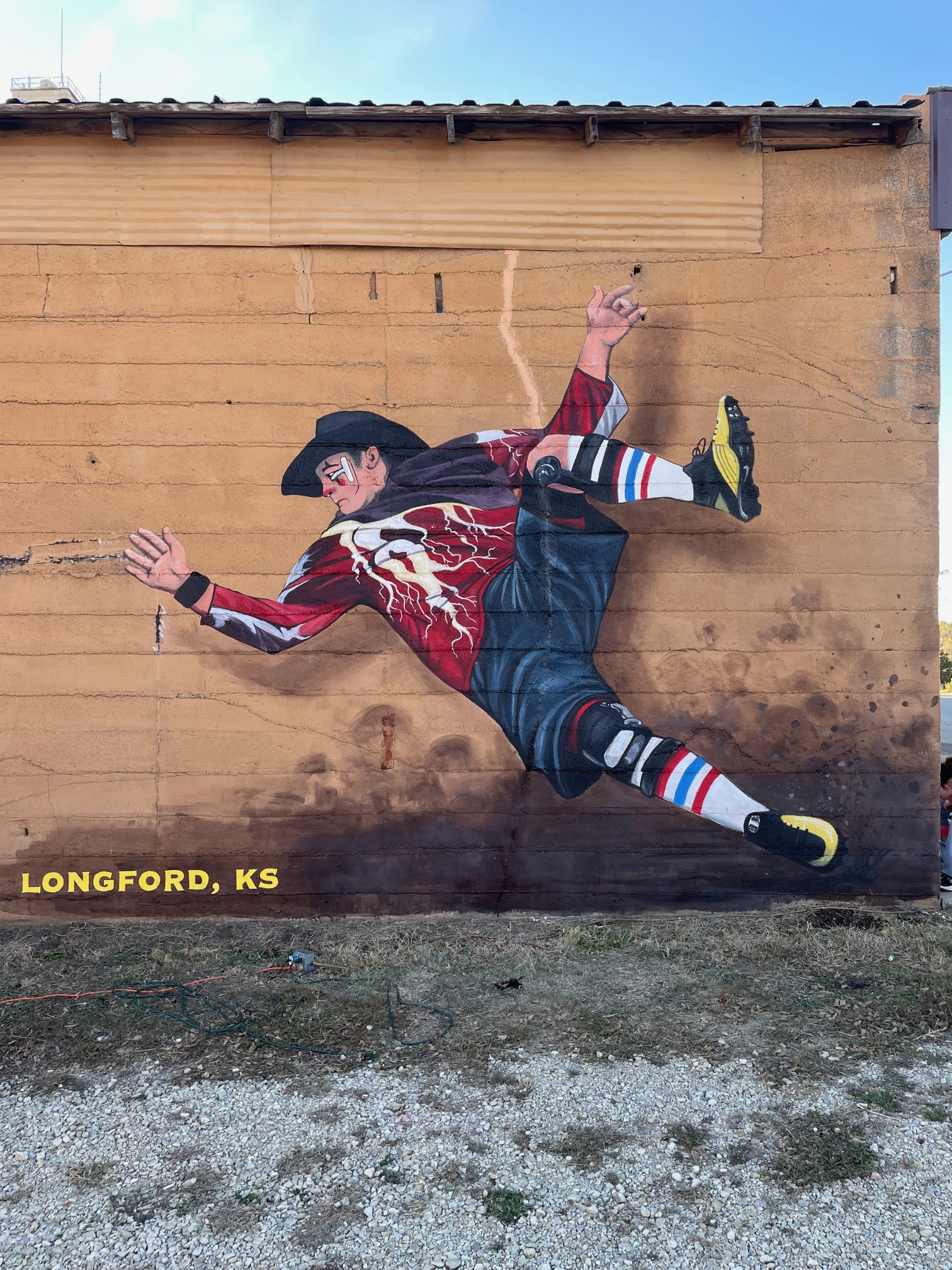
The Guardian by Whitney Kerr III (2021)
