= Morganville, Kansas =

City in Clay County, Kansas

- City
- Location within Clay County and Kansas

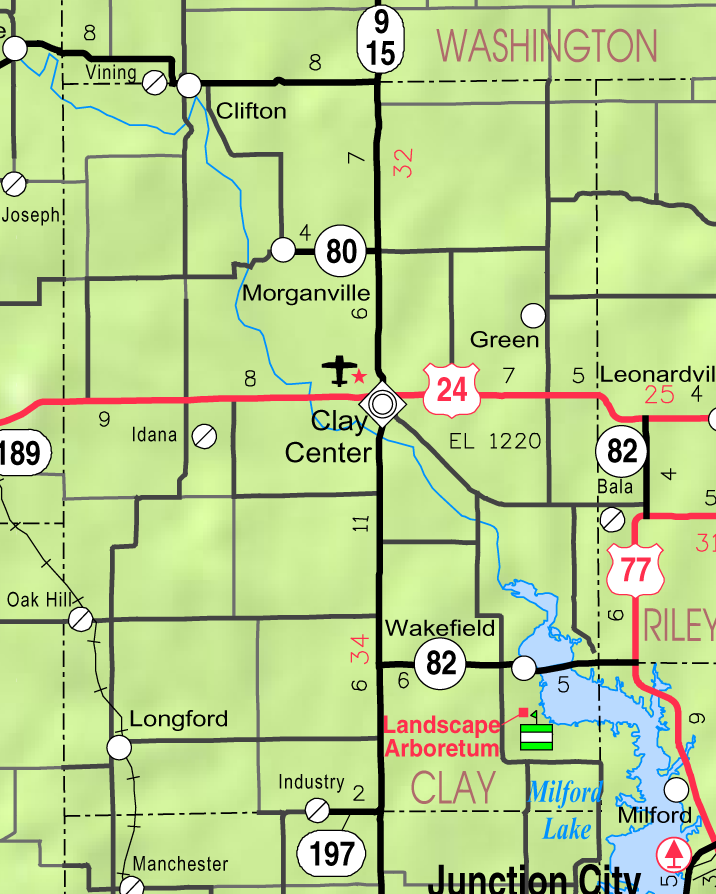
- KDOT map of Clay County (legend)
- Coordinates: 39°28′00″N 97°12′14″W
- Country: United States
- State: Kansas
- County: Clay

Area
  - Total: 0.34 sq mi (0.89 km^{2})
  - Land: 0.34 sq mi (0.88 km^{2})
  - Water: 0.0039 sq mi (0.01 km^{2})
- Elevation: 1,234 ft (376 m)

Population (2020)
  - Total: 180
  - Density: 530/sq mi (200/km^{2})
- Time zone: UTC-6 (CST)
  - Summer (DST): UTC-5 (CDT)
- ZIP Code: 67468
- Area code: 785
- FIPS code: 20-48225
- GNIS ID: 2395401

Morganville is a city in Clay County, Kansas, United States. As of the 2020 census, the population of the city was 180.

== History ==
Morganville was founded in 1870. It was named for its founder, Ebenezer Morgan. The first store in Morganville opened in 1871.

The post office in Morganville was originally called Della. It was established in 1871.

Morganville was located on the Chicago, Rock Island and Pacific Railroad.

== Geography ==
According to the United States Census Bureau, the city has a total area of 0.34 square miles (0.88 km^{2}), all land.

== Demographics ==
Historical population
Census	Pop.	Note	%±
1890	233		—
1900	350		50.2%
1910	285		−18.6%
1920	262		−8.1%
1930	281		7.3%
1940	264		−6.0%
1950	278		5.3%
1960	226		−18.7%
1970	257		13.7%
1980	261		1.6%
1990	181		−30.7%
2000	198		9.4%
2010	192		−3.0%
2020	180		−6.2%
U.S. Decennial Census

=== 2020 census ===
The 2020 United States census counted 180 people, 75 households, and 57 families in Morganville. The population density was 531.0 per square mile (205.0/km^{2}). There were 80 housing units at an average density of 236.0 per square mile (91.1/km^{2}). The racial makeup was 92.78% (167) white or European American (92.22% non-Hispanic white), 0.0% (0) black or African-American, 0.0% (0) Native American or Alaska Native, 1.11% (2) Asian, 0.0% (0) Pacific Islander or Native Hawaiian, 0.0% (0) from other races, and 6.11% (11) from two or more races. Hispanic or Latino of any race was 2.22% (4) of the population.

Of the 75 households, 38.7% had children under the age of 18; 60.0% were married couples living together; 18.7% had a female householder with no spouse or partner present. 20.0% of households consisted of individuals and 12.0% had someone living alone who was 65 years of age or older. The average household size was 2.7 and the average family size was 3.3. The percentage of those with a bachelor's degree or higher was estimated to be 5.6% of the population.

24.4% of the population was under the age of 18, 7.8% from 18 to 24, 21.1% from 25 to 44, 26.7% from 45 to 64, and 20.0% who were 65 years of age or older. The median age was 42.3 years. For every 100 females, there were 83.7 males. For every 100 females ages 18 and older, there were 83.8 males.

The 2016–2020 5-year American Community Survey estimates show that the median household income was $41,875 (with a margin of error of +/- $12,399) and the median family income was $45,833 (+/- $14,042). Males had a median income of $35,000 (+/- $11,473) versus $25,625 (+/- $11,652) for females. The median income for those above 16 years old was $33,250 (+/- $7,457). Approximately, 8.3% of families and 12.7% of the population were below the poverty line, including 18.8% of those under the age of 18 and 4.8% of those ages 65 or over.

=== 2010 census ===
As of the census of 2010, there were 192 people, 79 households, and 55 families residing in the city. The population density was 564.7 inhabitants per square mile (218.0/km^{2}). There were 86 housing units at an average density of 252.9 per square mile (97.6/km^{2}). The racial makeup of the city was 97.4% White, 1.0% African American, 0.5% from other races, and 1.0% from two or more races. Hispanic or Latino of any race were 2.6% of the population.

There were 79 households, of which 29.1% had children under the age of 18 living with them, 58.2% were married couples living together, 7.6% had a female householder with no husband present, 3.8% had a male householder with no wife present, and 30.4% were non-families. 26.6% of all households were made up of individuals, and 16.5% had someone living alone who was 65 years of age or older. The average household size was 2.43 and the average family size was 2.89.

The median age in the city was 43.5 years. 23.4% of residents were under the age of 18; 7.9% were between the ages of 18 and 24; 22.5% were from 25 to 44; 28.6% were from 45 to 64; and 17.7% were 65 years of age or older. The gender makeup of the city was 53.1% male and 46.9% female.

=== 2000 census ===
As of the census of 2000, there were 198 people, 77 households, and 54 families residing in the city. The population density was 581.0 inhabitants per square mile (224.3/km^{2}). There were 88 housing units at an average density of 258.2 per square mile (99.7/km^{2}). The racial makeup of the city was 96.46% White, 0.51% Native American, 1.01% from other races, and 2.02% from two or more races. Hispanic or Latino of any race were 1.01% of the population.

There were 77 households, out of which 31.2% had children under the age of 18 living with them, 61.0% were married couples living together, 3.9% had a female householder with no husband present, and 28.6% were non-families. 26.0% of all households were made up of individuals, and 11.7% had someone living alone who was 65 years of age or older. The average household size was 2.57 and the average family size was 3.11.

In the city, the population was spread out, with 30.8% under the age of 18, 3.5% from 18 to 24, 22.7% from 25 to 44, 23.7% from 45 to 64, and 19.2% who were 65 years of age or older. The median age was 40 years. For every 100 females, there were 104.1 males. For every 100 females age 18 and over, there were 101.5 males.

The median income for a household in the city was $33,125, and the median income for a family was $36,429. Males had a median income of $24,688 versus $21,563 for females. The per capita income for the city was $12,423. About 2.3% of families and 4.4% of the population were below the poverty line, including 7.7% of those under the age of eighteen and none of those 65 or over.

== Education ==
The community is served by Clay County USD 379 public school district.

Morganville schools were closed through school unification. The Morganville High School mascot was the Morganville Eagles.
