= Sherman Township, Ottawa County, Kansas =

Township in Ottawa County, Kansas, U.S.

Sherman Township
- Township
- Location within Ottawa County
- Coordinates: 39.262919°N 97.536942°W
- Country: United States
- State: Kansas
- County: Ottawa

Area
  - Total: 36.171 sq mi (93.68 km^{2})
  - Land: 36.171 sq mi (93.68 km^{2})
  - Water: 0 sq mi (0 km^{2}) 0%
- Elevation: 1,394 ft (425 m)

Population (2020)
  - Total: 43
  - Density: 1.2/sq mi (0.46/km^{2})
- Time zone: UTC-6 (CST)
  - Summer (DST): UTC-5 (CDT)
- Area code: 785
- GNIS feature ID: 476151

Sherman Township is a township in Ottawa County, Kansas, United States. As of the 2020 census, its population was 43.

== Geography ==
Sherman Township covers an area of 36.171 square miles (93.68 square kilometers).

=== Adjacent townships ===
- Oakland Township, Cloud County (north)
- Starr Township, Cloud County (northeast)
- Chapman Township, Ottawa County (east)
- Durham Township, Ottawa County (southeast)
- Grant Township, Ottawa County (south)
- Blaine Township, Ottawa County (southwest)
- Logan Township, Ottawa County (west)
- Meredith Township, Cloud County (northwest)
