= Sherman Township, St. Joseph County, Michigan =

Sherman Township, Michigan
- Township
- Location within the state of Michigan Sherman Township, Michigan (the United States)
- Coordinates: 41°51′5″N 85°27′11″W
- Country: United States
- State: Michigan
- County: St. Joseph

Area
  - Total: 35.0 sq mi (90.6 km^{2})
  - Land: 33.1 sq mi (85.7 km^{2})
  - Water: 1.9 sq mi (4.8 km^{2})
- Elevation: 958 ft (292 m)

Population (2020)
  - Total: 3,444
  - Density: 104/sq mi (40.2/km^{2})
- Time zone: UTC-5 (Eastern (EST))
  - Summer (DST): UTC-4 (EDT)
- FIPS code: 26-73300
- GNIS feature ID: 1627078
- Website: https://www.shermantwp.net/

Sherman Township is a civil township of St. Joseph County in the U.S. state of Michigan, located just north of Sturgis. The population was 3,444 at the 2020 census.

== Communities ==
- Chapin Lake was an unincorporated community on the lake of the same name.
- Crossman Lake was an unincorporated community. It was started by Abel Crossman in 1840.

== Geography ==
According to the United States Census Bureau, the township has a total area of 35.0 square miles (90.6 km^{2}), of which 33.1 square miles (85.7 km^{2}) is land and 1.9 square miles (4.8 km^{2} or 5.35%) is water. Major roads in the township include M-66, Banker Street Rd., Featherstone Rd., Shimmel Rd., and Balk Rd.

== Demographics ==
As of the census of 2000, there were 3,248 people, 1,175 households, and 909 families residing in the township. The population density was 98.1 inhabitants per square mile (37.9/km^{2}). There were 1,353 housing units at an average density of 40.9 per square mile (15.8/km^{2}). The racial makeup of the township was 97.14% White, 0.65% African American, 0.18% Native American, 0.68% Asian, 0.03% Pacific Islander, 0.49% from other races, and 0.83% from two or more races. Hispanic or Latino of any race were 1.45% of the population.

There were 1,175 households, out of which 32.9% had children under the age of 18 living with them, 66.8% were married couples living together, 6.8% had a female householder with no husband present, and 22.6% were non-families. 18.0% of all households were made up of individuals, and 6.9% had someone living alone who was 65 years of age or older. The average household size was 2.69 and the average family size was 3.05.

In the township the population was spread out, with 24.8% under the age of 18, 8.4% from 18 to 24, 28.0% from 25 to 44, 26.4% from 45 to 64, and 12.4% who were 65 years of age or older. The median age was 39 years. For every 100 females, there were 104.7 males. For every 100 females age 18 and over, there were 101.3 males.

The median income for a household in the township was $47,727, and the median income for a family was $54,291. Males had a median income of $38,106 versus $27,500 for females. The per capita income for the township was $20,904. About 4.4% of families and 6.8% of the population were below the poverty line, including 6.9% of those under age 18 and 7.5% of those age 65 or over.
