= Sherman Township, Grant County, Kansas =

Sherman Township
- Township
- Location in Grant County
- Coordinates: 37°38′45″N 101°08′47″W
- Country: United States
- State: Kansas
- County: Grant

Area
  - Total: 215.73 sq mi (558.75 km^{2})
  - Land: 215.72 sq mi (558.72 km^{2})
  - Water: 0.012 sq mi (0.03 km^{2}) 0.01%
- Elevation: 3,080 ft (940 m)

Population (2020)
  - Total: 437
  - Density: 2.03/sq mi (0.782/km^{2})
- GNIS feature ID: 0471722

Sherman Township is a township in Grant County, Kansas, United States. As of the 2020 census, its population was 437.

== Geography ==
Sherman Township covers an area of 215.73 square miles (558.7 km^{2}) and contains no incorporated settlements. According to the USGS, it contains one cemetery, Shockey.

The stream of Wolf Creek runs through this township.
