= Sherman Township, Crawford County, Kansas =

Sherman Township
- Township
- Location in Crawford County
- Coordinates: 37°37′00″N 094°51′36″W
- Country: United States
- State: Kansas
- County: Crawford

Area
  - Total: 72.62 sq mi (188.08 km^{2})
  - Land: 72.29 sq mi (187.24 km^{2})
  - Water: 0.32 sq mi (0.84 km^{2}) 0.45%
- Elevation: 1,033 ft (315 m)

Population (2020)
  - Total: 486
  - Density: 6.72/sq mi (2.60/km^{2})
- GNIS feature ID: 0474998

Sherman Township is a township in Crawford County, Kansas, United States. As of the 2020 census, its population was 486.

== Geography ==
Sherman Township covers an area of 72.62 square miles (188.1 km^{2}) and contains no incorporated settlements. According to the USGS, it contains two cemeteries: Farlington and Iowa.
