= Willowdale Township, Kansas =

Township in Dickinson County, Kansas

Willowdale Township
- Township
- Location in Dickinson County
- Coordinates: 39°00′10″N 097°19′01″W
- Country: United States
- State: Kansas
- County: Dickinson

Area
  - Total: 36.06 sq mi (93.39 km^{2})
  - Land: 36.04 sq mi (93.35 km^{2})
  - Water: 0.019 sq mi (0.05 km^{2}) 0.05%
- Elevation: 1,309 ft (399 m)

Population (2020)
  - Total: 283
  - Density: 7.85/sq mi (3.03/km^{2})
- GNIS feature ID: 0476476

Willowdale Township is a township in Dickinson County, Kansas, United States. As of the 2020 census, its population was 283.

== History ==
Willowdale Township was organized in 1872.

== Geography ==
Willowdale Township covers an area of 36.06 square miles (93.4 km^{2}) and contains no incorporated settlements.
