= Chapman Township, Clay County, Kansas =

Chapman Township
- Township
- Location in Clay County
- Coordinates: 39°10′45″N 097°19′01″W
- Country: United States
- State: Kansas
- County: Clay

Area
  - Total: 36 sq mi (93 km^{2})
  - Land: 35.88 sq mi (92.92 km^{2})
  - Water: 0.031 sq mi (0.08 km^{2}) 0.09%
- Elevation: 1,352 ft (412 m)

Population (2020)
  - Total: 175
  - Density: 4.88/sq mi (1.88/km^{2})
- GNIS feature ID: 0476299

Chapman Township is a township in Clay County, Kansas, United States. As of the 2020 census, its population was 175.

== Geography ==
Chapman Township covers an area of 35.91 square miles (93.0 km^{2}) and contains one incorporated settlement, Longford. According to the USGS, it contains one cemetery, Swartwood.

The stream of West Chapman Creek runs through this township.
