= Oakland Township, Cloud County, Kansas =

Oakland Township
- Township
- Location in Cloud County
- Coordinates: 39°21′30″N 097°32′11″W
- Country: United States
- State: Kansas
- County: Cloud

Area
  - Total: 36.11 sq mi (93.53 km^{2})
  - Land: 36.06 sq mi (93.39 km^{2})
  - Water: 0.054 sq mi (0.14 km^{2}) 0.15%
- Elevation: 1,532 ft (467 m)

Population (2020)
  - Total: 36
  - Density: 1.0/sq mi (0.39/km^{2})
- GNIS feature ID: 0475997

Oakland Township is a township in Cloud County, Kansas, United States. As of the 2020 census, its population was 36.

== History ==
Oakland Township was organized in 1874.

== Geography ==
Oakland Township covers an area of 36.11 square miles (93.5 km^{2}) and contains no incorporated settlements. According to the USGS, it contains one cemetery, Oakland Union.
