= Ottawa County, Kansas =

County in Kansas, United States

- County
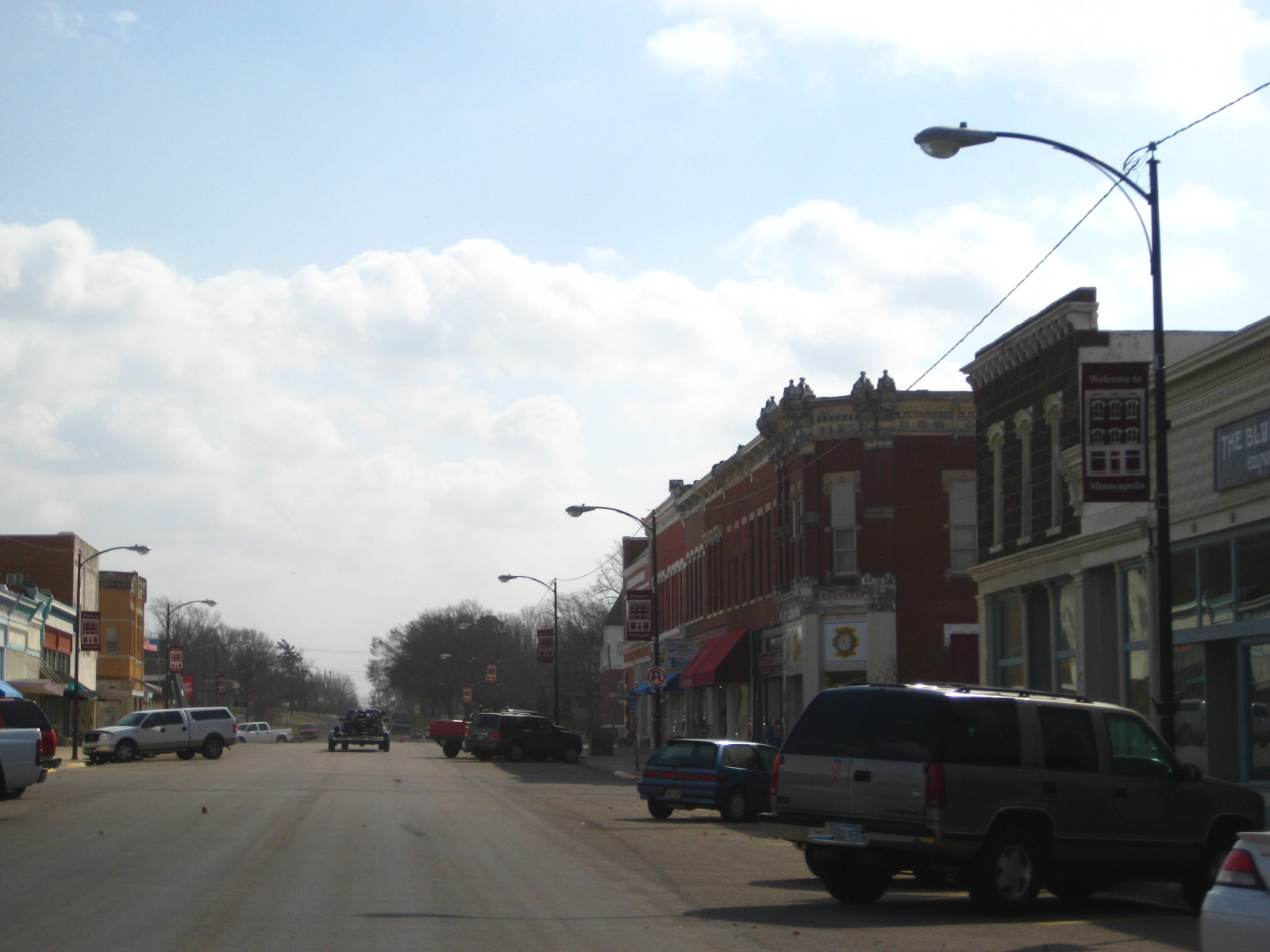
- Downtown Minneapolis (2009)

- Location within the U.S. state of Kansas
- Coordinates: 39°08′00″N 97°40′00″W
- Country: United States
- State: Kansas
- Founded: February 27, 1860
- Named for: Odawa tribe
- Seat: Minneapolis
- Largest city: Minneapolis

Area
  - Total: 721 sq mi (1,870 km^{2})
  - Land: 721 sq mi (1,870 km^{2})
  - Water: 0.6 sq mi (1.6 km^{2}) 0.08%

Population (2020)
  - Total: 5,735
  - Estimate (2025): 5,744 ▲
  - Density: 8/sq mi (3.1/km^{2})
- Time zone: UTC−6 (Central)
  - Summer (DST): UTC−5 (CDT)
- Congressional district: 1st
- Website: ottawacounty.org

Ottawa County is a county located in the U.S. state of Kansas. Its county seat and largest city is Minneapolis. As of the 2020 census, the county population was 5,735. The county was named after the Odawa tribe.

== History ==
=== Early history ===
For many millennia, the Great Plains of North America was inhabited by nomadic Native Americans. From the 16th century to 18th century, the Kingdom of France claimed ownership of large parts of North America. In 1762, after the French and Indian War, France secretly ceded New France to Spain, per the Treaty of Fontainebleau.

=== 19th century ===
In 1802, Spain returned most of the land to France, but keeping title to about 7,500 square miles. In 1803, most of the land for modern day Kansas was acquired by the United States from France as part of the 828,000 square mile Louisiana Purchase for 2.83 cents per acre.

In 1854, the Kansas Territory was organized, then in 1861 Kansas became the 34th U.S. state. In 1860, Ottawa County was established.

=== 20th century ===
Following amendment to the Kansas Constitution in 1986, Ottawa County remained a prohibition, or dry county until 2006, when voters approved the sale of alcoholic liquor by the individual drink with a 30% food sales requirement.

== Geography ==
According to the U.S. Census Bureau, the county has a total area of 721 square miles (1,870 km^{2}), of which 721 square miles (1,870 km^{2}) is land and 0.6 square miles (1.6 km^{2}) (0.08%) is water.

=== Features ===
The Solomon River is the longest river in the county, entering from Cloud County to the northwest and exiting to Saline County to the southeast. The Saline River traverses the southwestern portion of the county, going from Lincoln County to Saline County.

The largest lake is Ottawa State Fishing Lake, a 111-acre (0.45 km^{2}) reservoir to the east of Minneapolis. It is managed by the Kansas Department of Wildlife and Parks.

=== Adjacent counties ===
- Cloud County (north)
- Clay County (northeast)
- Dickinson County (southeast)
- Saline County (south)
- Lincoln County (west)
- Mitchell County (northwest)

== Demographics ==
Historical population
Census	Pop.	Note	%±
1870	2,127		—
1880	10,307		384.6%
1890	12,581		22.1%
1900	11,182		−11.1%
1910	11,811		5.6%
1920	10,714		−9.3%
1930	9,819		−8.4%
1940	9,224		−6.1%
1950	7,265		−21.2%
1960	6,779		−6.7%
1970	6,183		−8.8%
1980	5,971		−3.4%
1990	5,634		−5.6%
2000	6,163		9.4%
2010	6,091		−1.2%
2020	5,735		−5.8%
2025 (est.)	5,744	▲	0.2%
U.S. Decennial Census; 1790-1960 1900-1990; 1990-2000 2010-2020

Ottawa County is part of the Salina, KS Micropolitan Statistical Area.

=== Racial and ethnic composition ===
Ottawa County, Kansas – Racial and ethnic composition Note: the US Census treats Hispanic/Latino as an ethnic category. This table excludes Latinos from the racial categories and assigns them to a separate category. Hispanics/Latinos may be of any race.
Race / Ethnicity (NH = Non-Hispanic)	Pop 1980	Pop 1990	Pop 2000	Pop 2010	Pop 2020	% 1980	% 1990	% 2000	% 2010	% 2020
White alone (NH)	5,918	5,573	5,969	5,828	5,268	99.11%	98.92%	96.85%	95.68%	91.86%
Black or African American alone (NH)	7	4	31	49	30	0.12%	0.07%	0.50%	0.80%	0.52%
Native American or Alaska Native alone (NH)	11	16	21	20	22	0.18%	0.28%	0.34%	0.33%	0.38%
Asian alone (NH)	5	7	8	9	10	0.08%	0.12%	0.13%	0.15%	0.17%
Native Hawaiian or Pacific Islander alone (NH)	x	x	1	0	0	x	x	0.02%	0.00%	0.00%
Other race alone (NH)	0	0	0	1	15	0.00%	0.00%	0.00%	0.02%	0.26%
Mixed race or Multiracial (NH)	x	x	53	63	246	x	x	0.86%	1.03%	4.29%
Hispanic or Latino (any race)	30	34	80	121	144	0.50%	0.60%	1.30%	1.99%	2.51%
Total	5,971	5,634	6,163	6,091	5,735	100.00%	100.00%	100.00%	100.00%	100.00%

=== 2020 census ===
As of the 2020 census, the county had a population of 5,735. The median age was 44.1 years. 23.1% of residents were under the age of 18 and 21.2% of residents were 65 years of age or older. For every 100 females there were 106.1 males, and for every 100 females age 18 and over there were 103.9 males age 18 and over.

The racial makeup of the county was 93.1% White, 0.5% Black or African American, 0.4% American Indian and Alaska Native, 0.2% Asian, 0.0% Native Hawaiian and Pacific Islander, 0.5% from some other race, and 5.3% from two or more races. Hispanic or Latino residents of any race comprised 2.5% of the population.

0.0% of residents lived in urban areas, while 100.0% lived in rural areas.

There were 2,318 households in the county, of which 28.0% had children under the age of 18 living with them and 19.8% had a female householder with no spouse or partner present. About 28.2% of all households were made up of individuals and 13.0% had someone living alone who was 65 years of age or older.

There were 2,681 housing units, of which 13.5% were vacant. Among occupied housing units, 81.3% were owner-occupied and 18.7% were renter-occupied. The homeowner vacancy rate was 2.2% and the rental vacancy rate was 13.7%.

=== 2000 census ===
As of the census of 2000, there were 6,163 people, 2,430 households, and 1,718 families residing in the county. The population density was 8 people per square mile (3.1 people/km^{2}). There were 2,755 housing units at an average density of 4 per square mile (1.5/km^{2}). The racial makeup of the county was 97.53% White, 0.54% Black or African American, 0.37% Native American, 0.13% Asian, 0.02% Pacific Islander, 0.32% from other races, and 1.09% from two or more races. 1.30% of the population were Hispanic or Latino of any race.

There were 2,430 households, out of which 31.60% had children under the age of 18 living with them, 61.40% were married couples living together, 6.30% had a female householder with no husband present, and 29.30% were non-families. 25.70% of all households were made up of individuals, and 13.40% had someone living alone who was 65 years of age or older. The average household size was 2.46 and the average family size was 2.96.

In the county, the population was spread out, with 25.70% under the age of 18, 5.80% from 18 to 24, 26.70% from 25 to 44, 24.20% from 45 to 64, and 17.60% who were 65 years of age or older. The median age was 40 years. For every 100 females, there were 99.90 males. For every 100 females age 18 and over, there were 95.90 males.

The median income for a household in the county was $38,009, and the median income for a family was $46,033. Males had a median income of $30,761 versus $21,380 for females. The per capita income for the county was $17,663. About 5.10% of families and 8.60% of the population were below the poverty line, including 8.80% of those under age 18 and 11.70% of those age 65 or over.

== Government ==
=== Presidential elections ===
Presidential election results

United States presidential election results for Ottawa County, Kansas
Year	Republican		Democratic		Third party(ies)	
Year	No.	%	No.	%	No.	%
1888	1,569	56.08%	769	27.48%	460	16.44%
1892	1,444	47.48%	0	0.00%	1,597	52.52%
1896	1,256	45.29%	1,486	53.59%	31	1.12%
1900	1,509	51.61%	1,367	46.75%	48	1.64%
1904	1,682	66.27%	477	18.79%	379	14.93%
1908	1,444	50.54%	1,265	44.28%	148	5.18%
1912	517	18.28%	1,264	44.68%	1,048	37.04%
1916	2,013	40.55%	2,711	54.61%	240	4.83%
1920	2,512	62.94%	1,358	34.03%	121	3.03%
1924	2,475	60.25%	854	20.79%	779	18.96%
1928	3,158	72.53%	1,131	25.98%	65	1.49%
1932	1,884	41.32%	2,505	54.95%	170	3.73%
1936	2,230	44.31%	2,785	55.33%	18	0.36%
1940	2,810	57.06%	2,065	41.93%	50	1.02%
1944	2,428	63.11%	1,378	35.82%	41	1.07%
1948	2,203	59.00%	1,424	38.14%	107	2.87%
1952	2,916	77.66%	801	21.33%	38	1.01%
1956	2,329	68.80%	1,037	30.64%	19	0.56%
1960	2,190	66.81%	1,072	32.70%	16	0.49%
1964	1,491	48.85%	1,535	50.29%	26	0.85%
1968	1,740	62.66%	777	27.98%	260	9.36%
1972	2,065	72.94%	705	24.90%	61	2.15%
1976	1,629	52.86%	1,393	45.20%	60	1.95%
1980	2,118	71.87%	630	21.38%	199	6.75%
1984	2,345	75.74%	699	22.58%	52	1.68%
1988	1,836	64.78%	953	33.63%	45	1.59%
1992	1,284	45.53%	764	27.09%	772	27.38%
1996	1,846	63.88%	752	26.02%	292	10.10%
2000	1,977	70.83%	631	22.61%	183	6.56%
2004	2,333	78.53%	595	20.03%	43	1.45%
2008	2,323	75.28%	704	22.81%	59	1.91%
2012	2,295	78.25%	558	19.02%	80	2.73%
2016	2,283	78.64%	424	14.61%	196	6.75%
2020	2,610	81.79%	506	15.86%	75	2.35%
2024	2,475	82.42%	476	15.85%	52	1.73%

Like all of Kansas outside the eastern cities, Ottawa County is overwhelmingly Republican. No Democratic presidential candidate has won Ottawa County since Lyndon Johnson in 1964, and the last to reach thirty percent of the county's vote was Michael Dukakis in 1988 during a major Great Plains drought.

== Education ==
=== Unified school districts ===
- North Ottawa County USD 239
- Twin Valley USD 240

== Communities ==
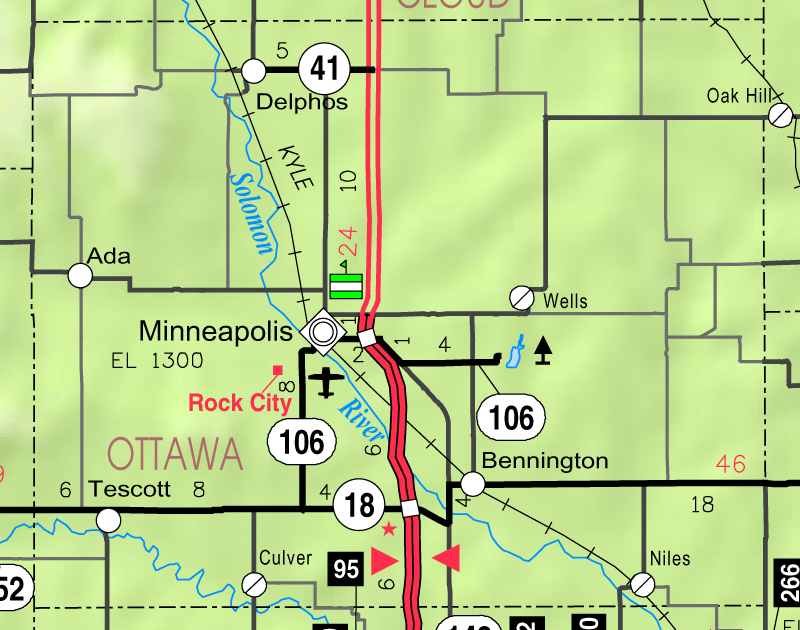
2005 map of Ottawa County (map legend)

List of townships / incorporated cities / unincorporated communities / extinct former communities within Ottawa County.

=== Cities ===
- Bennington
- Culver
- Delphos
- Minneapolis (county seat)
- Tescott

=== Unincorporated communities ===
† means a community is designated a Census-Designated Place (CDP) by the United States Census Bureau.

- Ada†
- Lindsey
- Niles†
- Sumnerville
- Verdi
- Wells†

=== Ghost town ===
- Vine Creek

=== Townships ===
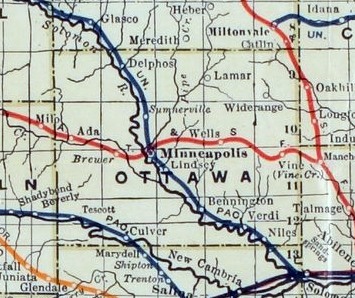
1915-1918 railroad map of Ottawa County

Ottawa County is divided into twenty townships. The city of Minneapolis is considered governmentally independent and is excluded from the census figures for the townships. In the following table, the population center is the largest city (or cities) included in that township's population total, if it is of a significant size.

Sources: 2000 U.S. Gazetteer from the U.S. Census Bureau.
Township	FIPS	Population center	Population	Population density /km^{2} (/sq mi)	Land area km^{2} (sq mi)	Water area km^{2} (sq mi)	Water %	Geographic coordinates
Bennington	06100		1,116	10 (27)	109 (42)	0 (0)	0.11%	39°0′31″N 97°36′20″W
Blaine	07150		111	1 (3)	94 (36)	0 (0)	0.07%	39°10′7″N 97°39′50″W
Buckeye	08975		101	1 (3)	78 (30)	0 (0)	0.13%	39°0′4″N 97°31′20″W
Center	11975		72	1 (2)	92 (36)	0 (0)	0.17%	39°6′53″N 97°44′39″W
Chapman	12575		67	1 (2)	93 (36)	0 (0)	0%	39°16′47″N 97°24′53″W
Concord	15175		209	2 (6)	90 (35)	0 (0)	0.08%	39°5′9″N 97°39′37″W
Culver	16725		318	3 (9)	94 (36)	0 (0)	0.08%	38°59′40″N 97°46′14″W
Durham	19075		25	0 (1)	93 (36)	0 (0)	0.02%	39°9′57″N 97°24′54″W
Fountain	24075		190	2 (5)	94 (36)	0 (0)	0.02%	39°10′6″N 97°53′1″W
Garfield	25725		95	1 (3)	94 (36)	0 (0)	0.11%	39°10′37″N 97°45′5″W
Grant	27900		93	1 (3)	94 (36)	0 (0)	0.03%	39°9′53″N 97°33′14″W
Henry	31325		22	0 (1)	93 (36)	0 (0)	0.14%	39°6′18″N 97°53′6″W
Lincoln	40950		143	2 (4)	93 (36)	0 (0)	0.10%	38°59′31″N 97°26′13″W
Logan	42050		82	1 (2)	93 (36)	0 (0)	0.10%	39°15′4″N 97°38′29″W
Morton	48500		498	5 (14)	93 (36)	0 (0)	0.14%	39°0′32″N 97°52′23″W
Ottawa	53600		49	1 (1)	93 (36)	0 (0)	0.03%	39°4′1″N 97°26′11″W
Richland	59500		218	2 (6)	92 (36)	0 (0)	0.51%	39°5′45″N 97°32′53″W
Sheridan	64725		589	6 (16)	94 (36)	0 (0)	0.06%	39°16′3″N 97°46′2″W
Sherman	65025		67	1 (2)	94 (36)	0 (0)	0%	39°16′1″N 97°32′27″W
Stanton	67950		52	1 (1)	95 (37)	0 (0)	0.27%	39°15′21″N 97°52′45″W

== See also ==
Community information for Kansas

- Kansas locations by per capita income
- List of counties in Kansas
- List of townships in Kansas
- List of cities in Kansas
- List of unincorporated communities in Kansas
- List of ghost towns in Kansas
