= Sherman Township, Decatur County, Kansas =

Sherman Township
- Township
- Location in Decatur County
- Coordinates: 39°57′27″N 100°27′32″W
- Country: United States
- State: Kansas
- County: Decatur

Area
  - Total: 35.6 sq mi (92.2 km^{2})
  - Land: 35.59 sq mi (92.19 km^{2})
  - Water: 0.0039 sq mi (0.01 km^{2}) 0.01%
- Elevation: 2,684 ft (818 m)

Population (2020)
  - Total: 17
  - Density: 0.48/sq mi (0.18/km^{2})
- GNIS feature ID: 0470929

Sherman Township is a township in Decatur County, Kansas, United States. As of the 2020 census, its population was 17.

== Geography ==
Sherman Township covers an area of 35.6 square miles (92 km^{2}) and contains no incorporated settlements.
