= Sherman Township, Dickinson County, Kansas =

Sherman Township
- Township
- Location in Dickinson County
- Coordinates: 39°05′30″N 097°06′31″W
- Country: United States
- State: Kansas
- County: Dickinson

Area
  - Total: 30.03 sq mi (77.79 km^{2})
  - Land: 30.03 sq mi (77.79 km^{2})
  - Water: 0 sq mi (0 km^{2}) 0%
- Elevation: 1,165 ft (355 m)

Population (2020)
  - Total: 164
  - Density: 5.46/sq mi (2.11/km^{2})
- GNIS feature ID: 0476319

Sherman Township is a township in Dickinson County, Kansas, United States. As of the 2020 census, its population was 164.

== Geography ==
Sherman Township covers an area of 30.03 square miles (77.8 km^{2}) and contains no incorporated settlements. According to the USGS, it contains two cemeteries: Green Ridge and Jones.
