= Manchester, Kansas =

City in Dickinson County, Kansas

- City
- Location within Dickinson County and Kansas

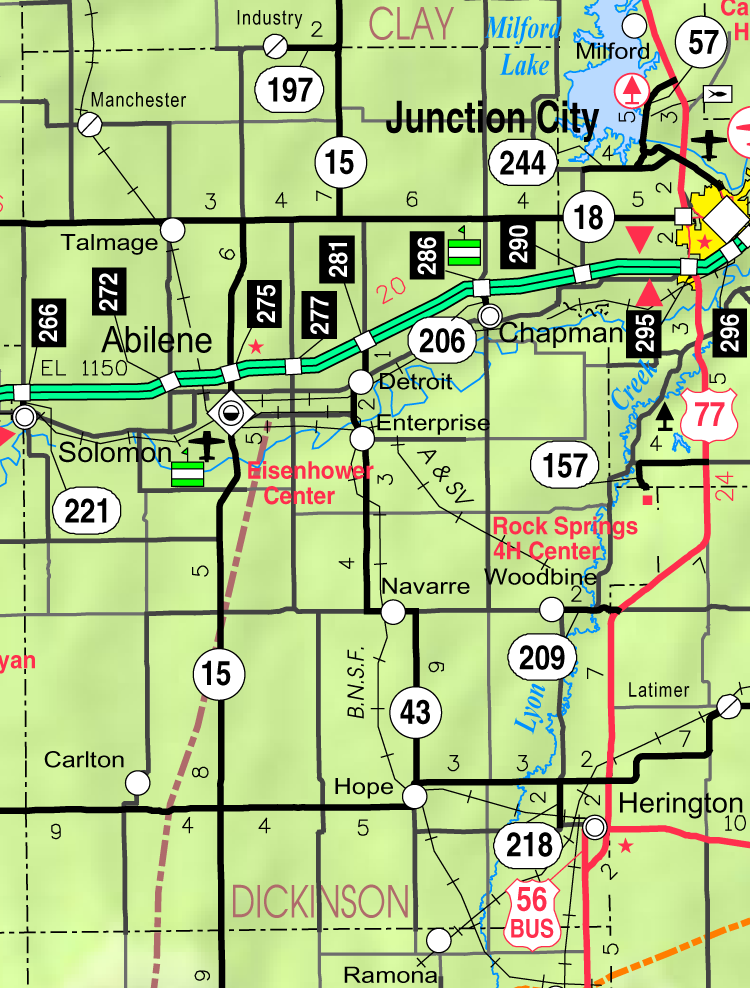
- KDOT map of Dickinson County (legend)
- Coordinates: 39°05′36″N 97°19′13″W
- Country: United States
- State: Kansas
- County: Dickinson
- Platted: 1887

Government
  - Type: Mayor–Council

Area
  - Total: 0.16 sq mi (0.42 km^{2})
  - Land: 0.16 sq mi (0.42 km^{2})
  - Water: 0 sq mi (0.00 km^{2})
- Elevation: 1,322 ft (403 m)

Population (2020)
  - Total: 47
  - Density: 290/sq mi (110/km^{2})
- Time zone: UTC-6 (CST)
  - Summer (DST): UTC-5 (CDT)
- ZIP Code: 67410
- Area code: 785
- FIPS code: 20-44225
- GNIS ID: 2395828

Manchester is a city in Dickinson County, Kansas, United States. As of the 2020 census, the population of the city was 47.

== History ==
Manchester was originally called Keystone, and under the latter name laid out in 1887. The name Manchester was adopted by 1890.

The post office in Manchester was discontinued in 1993.

In 1887, Atchison, Topeka and Santa Fe Railway built a branch line from Neva (three miles west of Strong City) through Manchester to Superior, Nebraska. In 1996, the Atchison, Topeka and Santa Fe Railway merged with Burlington Northern Railroad and renamed to the current BNSF Railway. Most locals still refer to this railroad as the "Santa Fe".

In 1888, a rail line of the Chicago, Kansas and Western Railroad opened, starting from Manchester and running 43 miles west to Barnard The Atchison, Topeka and Santa Fe Railway acquired the line in 1901. An application was filed in 1983 to abandon this "Minneapolis District" line.

== Geography ==
According to the United States Census Bureau, the city has a total area of 0.25 square miles (0.65 km^{2}), all land.

== Demographics ==
Historical population
Census	Pop.	Note	%±
1910	250		—
1920	263		5.2%
1930	241		−8.4%
1940	215		−10.8%
1950	151		−29.8%
1960	153		1.3%
1970	92		−39.9%
1980	98		6.5%
1990	80		−18.4%
2000	102		27.5%
2010	95		−6.9%
2020	47		−50.5%
U.S. Decennial Census

=== 2020 census ===
The 2020 United States census counted 47 people, 21 households, and 12 families in Manchester. The population density was 293.8 per square mile (113.4/km^{2}). There were 40 housing units at an average density of 250.0 per square mile (96.5/km^{2}). The racial makeup was 100.0% (47) white or European American (100.0% non-Hispanic white), 0.0% (0) black or African-American, 0.0% (0) Native American or Alaska Native, 0.0% (0) Asian, 0.0% (0) Pacific Islander or Native Hawaiian, 0.0% (0) from other races, and 0.0% (0) from two or more races. Hispanic or Latino of any race was 0.0% (0) of the population.

Of the 21 households, 9.5% had children under the age of 18; 42.9% were married couples living together; 33.3% had a female householder with no spouse or partner present. 33.3% of households consisted of individuals and 9.5% had someone living alone who was 65 years of age or older. The average household size was 2.5 and the average family size was 3.2.

12.8% of the population was under the age of 18, 4.3% from 18 to 24, 17.0% from 25 to 44, 46.8% from 45 to 64, and 19.1% who were 65 years of age or older. The median age was 50.5 years. For every 100 females, there were 176.5 males. For every 100 females ages 18 and older, there were 173.3 males.

The 2016–2020 5-year American Community Survey estimates show that the median household income was $47,500 (with a margin of error of +/- $42,864) and the median family income was $86,250 (+/- $73,940). The median income for those above 16 years old was $34,167 (+/- $18,570).

=== 2010 census ===
As of the census of 2010, there were 95 people, 38 households, and 24 families living in the city. The population density was 380.0 inhabitants per square mile (146.7/km^{2}). There were 60 housing units at an average density of 240.0 per square mile (92.7/km^{2}). The racial makeup of the city was 92.6% White, 4.2% Native American, 1.1% from other races, and 2.1% from two or more races. Hispanic or Latino of any race were 1.1% of the population.

There were 38 households, of which 34.2% had children under the age of 18 living with them, 36.8% were married couples living together, 18.4% had a female householder with no husband present, 7.9% had a male householder with no wife present, and 36.8% were non-families. 31.6% of all households were made up of individuals, and 7.9% had someone living alone who was 65 years of age or older. The average household size was 2.50 and the average family size was 3.21.

The median age in the city was 35.9 years. 31.6% of residents were under the age of 18; 3.1% were between the ages of 18 and 24; 26.4% were from 25 to 44; 30.5% were from 45 to 64; and 8.4% were 65 years of age or older. The gender makeup of the city was 54.7% male and 45.3% female.

=== 2000 census ===
As of the census of 2000, there were 102 people, 46 households, and 31 families living in the city. The population density was 398.7 inhabitants per square mile (153.9/km^{2}). There were 52 housing units at an average density of 203.3 per square mile (78.5/km^{2}). The racial makeup of the city was 91.18% White, 0.98% African American, 0.98% Native American, 0.98% from other races, and 5.88% from two or more races. Hispanic or Latino of any race were 0.98% of the population.

There were 46 households, out of which 23.9% had children under the age of 18 living with them, 56.5% were married couples living together, 8.7% had a female householder with no husband present, and 32.6% were non-families. 26.1% of all households were made up of individuals, and 13.0% had someone living alone who was 65 years of age or older. The average household size was 2.22 and the average family size was 2.55.

In the city, the population was spread out, with 19.6% under the age of 18, 3.9% from 18 to 24, 29.4% from 25 to 44, 29.4% from 45 to 64, and 17.6% who were 65 years of age or older. The median age was 41 years. For every 100 females, there were 121.7 males. For every 100 females age 18 and over, there were 121.6 males.

The median income for a household in the city was $31,563, and the median income for a family was $32,500. Males had a median income of $22,500 versus $16,500 for females. The per capita income for the city was $14,035. There were 6.3% of families and 7.8% of the population living below the poverty line, including 12.0% of under eighteens and none of those over 64.

== Education ==
The community is served by Chapman USD 473 public school district. The Chapman High School mascot is Chapman Fighting Irish.
