= Flora Township, Kansas =

Flora Township
- Township
- Location in Dickinson County
- Coordinates: 39°05′30″N 097°19′01″W
- Country: United States
- State: Kansas
- County: Dickinson

Area
  - Total: 36.1 sq mi (93.4 km^{2})
  - Land: 36.03 sq mi (93.33 km^{2})
  - Water: 0.027 sq mi (0.07 km^{2}) 0.07%
- Elevation: 1,302 ft (397 m)

Population (2020)
  - Total: 168
  - Density: 4.66/sq mi (1.80/km^{2})
- GNIS feature ID: 0476309

Flora Township is a township in Dickinson County, Kansas, United States. As of the 2020 census, its population was 168.

Flora Township was organized in 1879.

== Geography ==
Flora Township covers an area of 36.06 square miles (93.4 km^{2}) and contains one incorporated settlement, Manchester. According to the USGS, it contains three cemeteries: Keystone, Prairiedale and White Cloud.
