= Solomon Township, Saline County, Kansas =

Township in Saline County, Kansas, U.S.

Solomon Township
- Township
- Location within Saline County
- Coordinates: 38.827307°N 97.432226°W
- Country: United States
- State: Kansas
- County: Saline

Government
  - District 1 County Commissioner: Annie Grevas (R)

Area
  - Total: 36.17 sq mi (93.7 km^{2})
  - Land: 36.161 sq mi (93.66 km^{2})
  - Water: 0.009 sq mi (0.023 km^{2}) 0.02%

Population (2020)
  - Total: 321
  - Density: 8.88/sq mi (3.43/km^{2})
- Time zone: UTC-6 (CST)
  - Summer (DST): UTC-5 (CDT)
- Area code: 785
- GNIS feature ID: 476843

Solomon Township is a township in Saline County, Kansas, United States. As of the 2020 census, its population was 321.

== History ==
Solomon Township had two other townships created from parts of it: Gypsum Township in 1871 and Dayton Township in 1877.

== Geography ==
Solomon Township covers an area of 36.17 square miles (93.7 square kilometers). The Smoky Hill River and Gypsum Creek flow through it.

=== Communities ===
- part of Kipp

=== Adjacent townships ===
Dayton Township, Saline County
Cambria Township, Saline County	northwest	north	northeast	Lincoln Township, Dickinson County
Greeley Township, Saline County	west	self	east	Garfield Township, Dickinson County
Walnut Township, Saline County	southwest	south	southeast	Wheatland Township, Dickinson County
Eureka Township, Saline County
