= Dayton Township, Saline County, Kansas =

Township in Saline County, Kansas, U.S.

Dayton Township
- Township
- Location within Saline County
- Coordinates: 38.9194°N 97.4239°W
- Country: United States
- State: Kansas
- County: Saline
- Established: 1877

Government
  - District 1 County Commissioner: Tom Arpke (R)

Area
  - Total: 35.499 sq mi (91.94 km^{2})
  - Land: 35.43 sq mi (91.8 km^{2})
  - Water: 0.069 sq mi (0.18 km^{2}) 0.19%

Population (2020)
  - Total: 129
  - Density: 3.64/sq mi (1.41/km^{2})
- Time zone: UTC-6 (CST)
  - Summer (DST): UTC-5 (CDT)
- Area code: 785
- GNIS feature ID: 476657

Dayton Township is a township in Saline County, Kansas, United States. As of the 2020 census, its population was 129.

== History ==
Dayton Township was organized in 1877 from Solomon Township.

== Geography ==
Dayton Township covers an area of 35.499 square miles (91.94 square kilometers). The Smoky Hill River and Solomon River run through it, as well as Buckeye Creek.

=== Communities ===
- part of Solomon

=== Adjacent townships ===
Lincoln Township, Ottawa County
Buckeye Township, Ottawa County	northwest	north	northeast	Willowdale Township, Dickinson County
Cambria Township, Saline County	west	self	east	Lincoln Township, Dickinson County
Greeley Township, Saline County	southwest	south	southeast	Garfield Township, Dickinson County
Solomon Township, Saline County

== Transportation ==
=== Major highways ===
- I-70
- US-40
