= Eureka Township, Saline County, Kansas =

Township in Saline County, Kansas, U.S.

Eureka Township
- Township
- Location within Saline County
- Coordinates: 38.7439°N 97.4189°W
- Country: United States
- State: Kansas
- County: Saline
- Established: 1873

Government
  - District 2 County Commissioner: Annie Grevas (R)

Area
  - Total: 36.260 sq mi (93.91 km^{2})
  - Land: 36.255 sq mi (93.90 km^{2})
  - Water: 0.005 sq mi (0.013 km^{2}) 0.01%

Population (2020)
  - Total: 659
  - Density: 18.2/sq mi (7.02/km^{2})
- Time zone: UTC-6 (CST)
  - Summer (DST): UTC-5 (CDT)
- Area code: 785
- GNIS feature ID: 476842

Eureka Township is a township in Saline County, Kansas, United States. As of the 2020 census, its population was 659.

== History ==
Eureka Township was organized in 1873 from Gypsum Township.

== Geography ==
Eureka Township covers an area of 36.260 square miles (93.91 square kilometers). Gypsum Creek flows through it, as well as its West Branch.

=== Communities ===
- Gypsum
- part of Kipp

=== Adjacent townships ===
Solomon Township, Saline County
Greeley Township, Saline County	northwest	north	northeast	Garfield Township, Dickinson County
Walnut Township, Saline County	west	self	east	Wheatland Township, Dickinson County
Liberty Township, Saline County	southwest	south	southeast	Holland Township, Dickinson County
Gypsum Township, Saline County

== Transportation ==
=== Major highways ===
- K-4
