= Smolan =

Smolan can refer to:

- Rick Smolan, photographer
- Sandy Smolan, feature film, television, and documentary film director
- Smolan, Kansas, a small town in the United States
- Smolan Township, Saline County, Kansas, a civil township
