= Falun (disambiguation) =

Falun is a city in Sweden.

Falun may also refer to:

== Places ==
- Falun Municipality, a municipality in Sweden, its seat is the city of Falun
- Falun, Alberta
- Falun, Kansas
- Falun, Wisconsin
- Falun Township (disambiguation)
- Falun, Sichuan (发轮), a town in Zizhong County, Sichuan, China

== Other uses ==
- Falun (symbol), an emblem used by the Falun Gong spiritual group
- Falun (geology)
