= Bavaria, Kansas =

Unincorporated community in Saline County, Kansas

- Unincorporated community and CDP
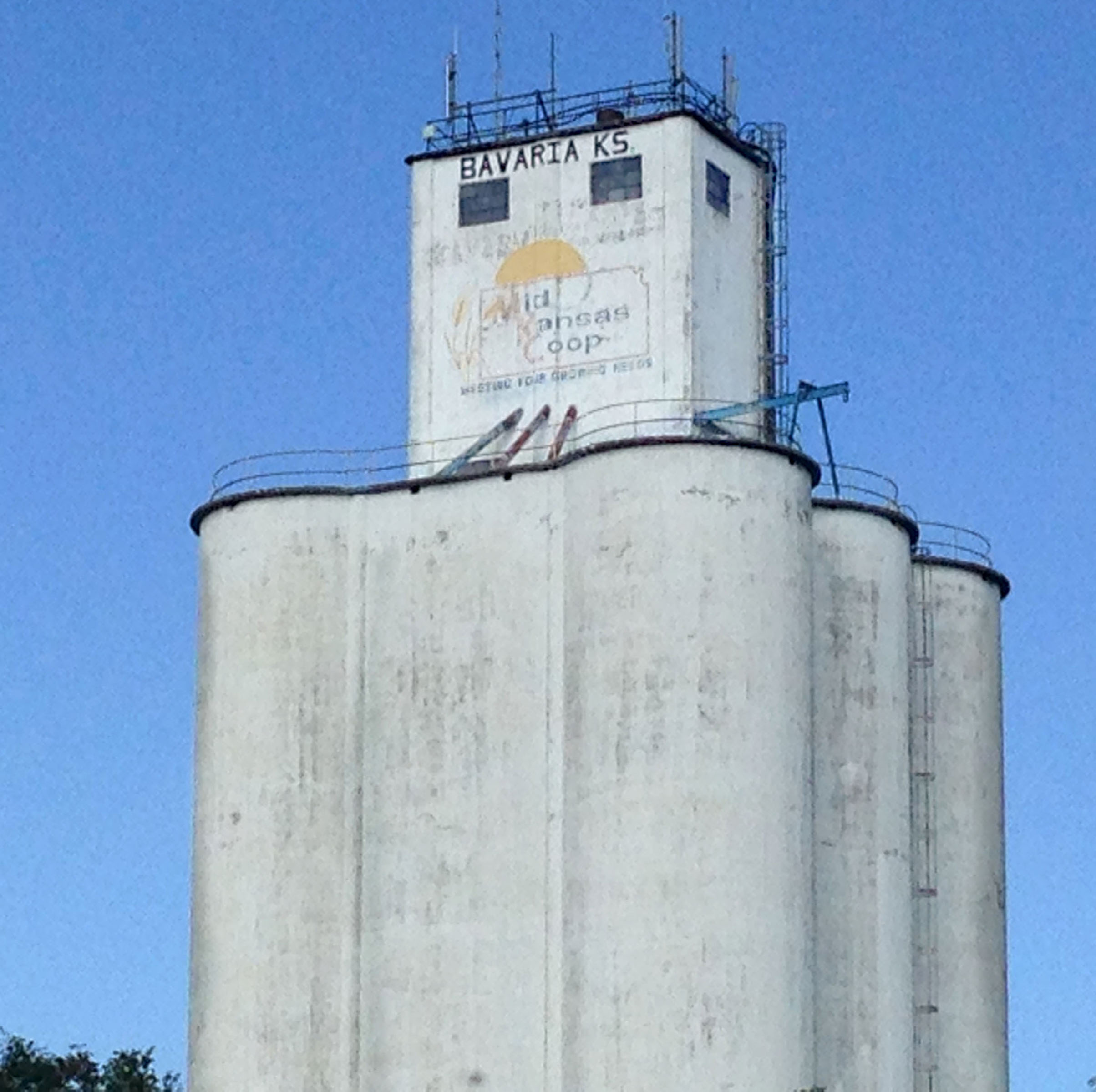
- Grain elevator in Bavaria (2015)

- Location within Saline County and Kansas

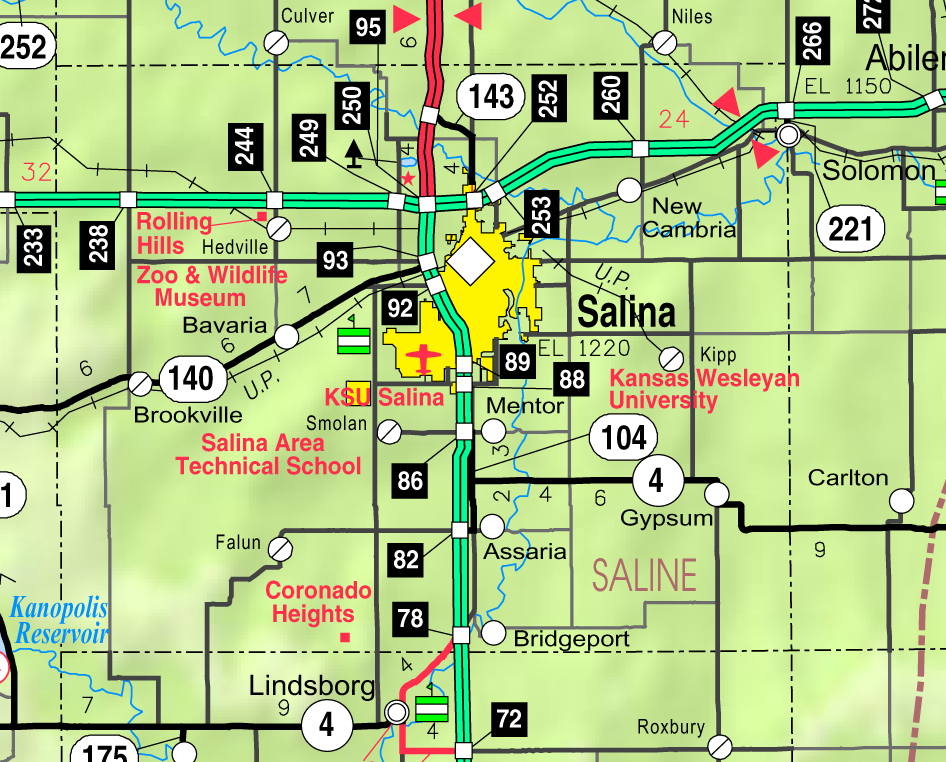
- KDOT map of Saline County (legend)
- Coordinates: 38°47′50″N 97°45′20″W
- Country: United States
- State: Kansas
- County: Saline
- Township: Ohio
- Founded: 1860s
- Named for: Bavaria
- Elevation: 1,273 ft (388 m)

Population (2020)
  - Total: 60
- Time zone: UTC-6 (CST)
  - Summer (DST): UTC-5 (CDT)
- Area code: 785
- FIPS code: 20-04575
- GNIS ID: 476783

Bavaria is an unincorporated community and census-designated place (CDP) in Saline County, Kansas, United States. As of the 2020 census, the population was 60. It lies along K-140 and a Union Pacific Railroad line west of Salina.

== History ==
The place was originally known as Hohneck, after Ernst Hohneck, who settled there in 1865. It was also known as Honek. Bavaria was laid out by E. F. Drake in 1877 and named after the State of Bavaria in Germany.

The post office in Bavaria was closed in 1986.

== Geography ==
Spring Creek flows through the community.

== Demographics ==
Historical population
Census	Pop.	Note	%±
2020	60		—
U.S. Decennial Census

Bavaria is a part of the Salina micropolitan area.

The 2020 United States census counted 60 people, 26 households, and 17 families in Bavaria. The population density was 263.2 per square mile (101.6/km^{2}). There were 26 housing units at an average density of 114.0 per square mile (44.0/km^{2}). The racial makeup was 80.0% (48) white or European American (73.33% non-Hispanic white), 0.0% (0) black or African-American, 0.0% (0) Native American or Alaska Native, 5.0% (3) Asian, 0.0% (0) Pacific Islander or Native Hawaiian, 10.0% (6) from other races, and 5.0% (3) from two or more races. Hispanic or Latino of any race was 16.67% (10) of the population.

Of the 26 households, 30.8% had children under the age of 18; 57.7% were married couples living together; 23.1% had a female householder with no spouse or partner present. 34.6% of households consisted of individuals and 23.1% had someone living alone who was 65 years of age or older. The average household size was 3.1 and the average family size was 3.7. The percent of those with a bachelor's degree or higher was estimated to be 0.0% of the population.

25.0% of the population was under the age of 18, 1.7% from 18 to 24, 21.7% from 25 to 44, 30.0% from 45 to 64, and 21.7% who were 65 years of age or older. The median age was 45.3 years. For every 100 females, there were 106.9 males. For every 100 females ages 18 and older, there were 104.5 males.

== Education ==
The community is served by Ell-Saline USD 307 public school district. Ell-Saline schools are located in Brookville. The Ell-Saline school mascot is Cardinals.

Bavaria schools were closed through school unification. The Bavaria High School mascot was Tigers.
