= Soldier Cap Mound =

Coordinates: 38°42′59″N 97°47′53″W

Soldier Cap Mound is a summit in Saline County, Kansas, in the United States. With an elevation of 1,473 feet (449 m), Soldier Cap Mound is the 48th highest summit in the state of Kansas.

Soldier Cap Mound was named from its resemblance to a soldier's headdress.
