= Saline County, Kansas =

County in Kansas, United States

- County
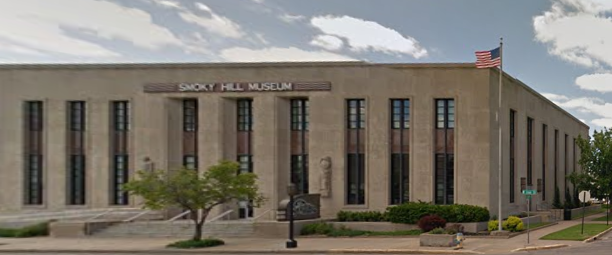
- Smoky Hills Museum in Salina (2013)

- Location within the U.S. state of Kansas
- Coordinates: 38°47′00″N 97°40′00″W
- Country: United States
- State: Kansas
- Founded: February 15, 1860
- Named for: Saline River
- Seat: Salina
- Largest city: Salina

Area
  - Total: 721 sq mi (1,870 km^{2})
  - Land: 720 sq mi (1,900 km^{2})
  - Water: 1.1 sq mi (2.8 km^{2}) 0.2%

Population (2020)
  - Total: 54,303
  - Estimate (2025): 53,377 ▼
  - Density: 75.4/sq mi (29.1/km^{2})
- Time zone: UTC−6 (Central)
  - Summer (DST): UTC−5 (CDT)
- Congressional district: 1st
- Website: salinecountyks.gov

Saline County is located in the U.S. state of Kansas. Its county seat and largest city is Salina. As of the 2020 census, the county population was 54,303. The county was named after the Saline River.

== History ==
=== Early history ===
For many millennia, the Great Plains of North America was inhabited by nomadic Native Americans. From the 16th century to 18th century, the Kingdom of France claimed ownership of large parts of North America. In 1762, after the French and Indian War, France secretly ceded New France to Spain, per the Treaty of Fontainebleau. In 1802, Spain returned most of the land to France, but keeping title to about 7,500 square miles.

In 1803, most of the land for modern day Kansas was acquired by the United States from France as part of the 828,000 square mile Louisiana Purchase for 2.83 cents per acre. In 1848, after the Mexican–American War, the Treaty of Guadalupe Hidalgo with Spain brought into the United States all or part of land for ten future states, including southwest Kansas. In 1854, the Kansas Territory was organized, then in 1861 Kansas became the 34th U.S. state.

=== 19th century ===
In 1860, Saline County was founded.

=== 20th century ===
Saline County was a prohibition, or "dry", county until the Kansas Constitution was amended in 1986 and voters approved the sale of alcoholic liquor by the individual drink with a 30% food sales requirement. The food sales requirement was removed with voter approval in 1994.

== Geography ==
According to the United States Census Bureau, the county has a total area of 721 square miles (1,870 km^{2}), of which 720 square miles (1,900 km^{2}) is land and 1.1 square miles (2.8 km^{2}) (0.2%) is water.

=== Major highways ===
- I-70 / US-40
- I-135
- US-81
- K-4
- K-104
- K-143

=== Adjacent counties ===
- Ottawa County (north)
- Dickinson County (east)
- Marion County (southeast)
- McPherson County (south)
- Ellsworth County (west)
- Lincoln County (northwest)

== Demographics ==
Historical population
Census	Pop.	Note	%±
1870	4,246		—
1880	13,808		225.2%
1890	17,442		26.3%
1900	17,076		−2.1%
1910	20,338		19.1%
1920	25,103		23.4%
1930	29,337		16.9%
1940	29,535		0.7%
1950	33,409		13.1%
1960	54,715		63.8%
1970	46,592		−14.8%
1980	48,905		5.0%
1990	49,301		0.8%
2000	53,597		8.7%
2010	55,606		3.7%
2020	54,303		−2.3%
2025 (est.)	53,377	▼	−1.7%
U.S. Decennial Census; 1790-1960 1900-1990; 1990-2000 2010-2020

Saline County is part of the Salina Micropolitan Statistical Area.

=== Racial and ethnic composition ===
Saline County, Kansas – Racial and ethnic composition Note: the US Census treats Hispanic/Latino as an ethnic category. This table excludes Latinos from the racial categories and assigns them to a separate category. Hispanics/Latinos may be of any race.
Race / Ethnicity (NH = Non-Hispanic)	Pop 1980	Pop 1990	Pop 2000	Pop 2010	Pop 2020	% 1980	% 1990	% 2000	% 2010	% 2020
White alone (NH)	45,782	45,826	46,645	45,671	41,506	93.61%	92.95%	87.03%	82.13%	76.43%
Black or African American alone (NH)	1,433	1,487	1,622	1,743	1,732	2.93%	3.02%	3.03%	3.13%	3.19%
Native American or Alaska Native alone (NH)	142	219	245	241	233	0.29%	0.44%	0.46%	0.43%	0.43%
Asian alone (NH)	354	523	903	1,138	1,109	0.72%	1.06%	1.68%	2.05%	2.04%
Native Hawaiian or Pacific Islander alone (NH)	x	x	20	21	26	x	x	0.04%	0.04%	0.05%
Other race alone (NH)	149	24	50	42	162	0.30%	0.05%	0.09%	0.08%	0.30%
Mixed race or Multiracial (NH)	x	x	884	1,347	2,893	x	x	1.65%	2.42%	5.33%
Hispanic or Latino (any race)	1,045	1,222	3,228	5,403	6,642	2.14%	2.48%	6.02%	9.72%	12.23%
Total	48,905	49,301	53,597	55,606	54,303	100.00%	100.00%	100.00%	100.00%	100.00%

=== 2020 census ===
As of the 2020 census, the county had a population of 54,303. The median age was 39.7 years. 23.1% of residents were under the age of 18 and 18.7% of residents were 65 years of age or older. For every 100 females there were 98.3 males, and for every 100 females age 18 and over there were 96.7 males age 18 and over.

The racial makeup of the county was 79.9% White, 3.4% Black or African American, 0.6% American Indian and Alaska Native, 2.1% Asian, 0.1% Native Hawaiian and Pacific Islander, 4.2% from some other race, and 9.7% from two or more races. Hispanic or Latino residents of any race comprised 12.2% of the population.

85.7% of residents lived in urban areas, while 14.3% lived in rural areas.

There were 22,250 households in the county, of which 28.3% had children under the age of 18 living with them and 26.7% had a female householder with no spouse or partner present. About 31.7% of all households were made up of individuals and 13.0% had someone living alone who was 65 years of age or older.

There were 24,076 housing units, of which 7.6% were vacant. Among occupied housing units, 64.7% were owner-occupied and 35.3% were renter-occupied. The homeowner vacancy rate was 1.5% and the rental vacancy rate was 9.3%.

=== 2000 census ===
As of the census of 2000, there were 53,597 people, 21,436 households, and 14,212 families residing in the county. The population density was 74 inhabitants per square mile (29/km^{2}). There were 22,695 housing units at an average density of 32 per square mile (12/km^{2}). The racial makeup of the county was 89.17% White, 3.10% Black or African American, 0.52% Native American, 1.70% Asian, 0.04% Pacific Islander, 3.33% from other races, and 2.14% from two or more races. 6.02% of the population were Hispanic or Latino of any race.

There were 21,436 households in the county, out of which 32.10% had children under the age of 18 living with them, 52.90% were married couples living together, 9.70% had a female householder with no husband present, and 33.70% were non-families. 28.30% of all households were made up of individuals, and 10.70% had someone living alone who was 65 years of age or older. The average household size was 2.43 and the average family size was 2.98.

In the county, the population was spread out, with 26.20% under the age of 18, 9.40% from 18 to 24, 28.40% from 25 to 44, 22.10% from 45 to 64, and 14.00% who were 65 years of age or older. The median age was 36 years. For every 100 females, there were 97.40 males. For every 100 females age 18 and over, there were 94.40 males.

The median income for a household in the county was $37,308, and the median income for a family was $46,362. Males had a median income of $31,509 versus $22,047 for females. The per capita income for the county was $19,073. About 6.00% of families and 8.80% of the population were below the poverty line, including 9.60% of those under age 18 and 8.80% of those age 65 or over.

== Government ==
=== Board of Commissioners ===
Saline County is governed by a Board of Commissioners. The commission enacts the annual budget for the county, currently set at about $38,000,000, creates policy to be implemented by the county administrator, approves contracts, and oversees legislation relating to the health, safety, and well-being of the county's citizens.

The Board of Commissioners has three members, one elected from each of the three commission districts. Commissioners are elected on a partisan basis. The districts are reapportioned every three years, with the three districts being equally populated. Term lengths are four years.

Current representatives on the Board of Commissioners are John Price (District 3; vice chairman), Monte Shadwick (District 1; secretary), and Jim Gile (District 2; chairman). In 2014, citizens voted to change the number of commissioners from three to five. The group, “Drive for Five”, successfully campaigned for better representation of the people. Monte Shadwick defeated incumbent commissioner Randy Duncan, who finished last in a three-way race.

Governor Sam Brownback was tasked with appointing the two new commission members that will serve for two years and then be up for election by the people. On January 12, 2015, Luci Larson and Dave Smith were appointed to the newly created 4th and 5th Districts.

=== County administrator ===
The county administrator is hired by the Board of Commissioners and is the administrative officer for the county. The administrator is responsible for researching administrative and operational issues and then presenting suggestions for improvement in government efficiency to the Board of Commissioners and for reviewing all requests for action brought to the Board of Commissioners. The county administrator also implements policies enacted by the Board of Commissioners, prepares the annual budget, and "supervises accounts payable, payroll, human resource division and central purchasing for the county." As needed, the county administrator will represent the county on boards and commissions.

The current county administrator is Andrew Manley.

=== Presidential elections ===
Presidential election results

United States presidential election results for Saline County, Kansas
Year	Republican		Democratic		Third party(ies)	
Year	No.	%	No.	%	No.	%
1888	2,263	57.97%	1,186	30.38%	455	11.65%
1892	1,817	45.17%	0	0.00%	2,206	54.83%
1896	1,706	42.01%	2,334	57.47%	21	0.52%
1900	2,245	49.67%	2,199	48.65%	76	1.68%
1904	2,797	70.35%	798	20.07%	381	9.58%
1908	2,297	50.15%	2,134	46.59%	149	3.25%
1912	534	11.15%	2,263	47.23%	1,994	41.62%
1916	3,984	43.25%	4,860	52.76%	368	3.99%
1920	5,554	64.42%	2,808	32.57%	260	3.02%
1924	6,534	62.20%	1,966	18.71%	2,005	19.09%
1928	7,872	71.20%	3,108	28.11%	76	0.69%
1932	5,265	41.22%	7,118	55.73%	389	3.05%
1936	6,061	43.35%	7,872	56.30%	50	0.36%
1940	7,975	54.69%	6,514	44.67%	92	0.63%
1944	7,571	59.51%	5,097	40.06%	55	0.43%
1948	7,928	53.14%	6,798	45.56%	194	1.30%
1952	12,326	75.12%	4,003	24.40%	80	0.49%
1956	11,172	69.32%	4,908	30.45%	37	0.23%
1960	11,023	62.74%	6,495	36.97%	50	0.28%
1964	6,533	39.94%	9,725	59.45%	99	0.61%
1968	9,324	55.43%	6,286	37.37%	1,212	7.20%
1972	12,592	68.74%	5,406	29.51%	321	1.75%
1976	11,218	55.79%	8,476	42.15%	413	2.05%
1980	12,758	60.27%	6,382	30.15%	2,029	9.58%
1984	15,244	69.41%	6,526	29.72%	191	0.87%
1988	11,371	57.96%	7,998	40.77%	249	1.27%
1992	8,565	36.26%	7,890	33.40%	7,168	30.34%
1996	12,475	55.34%	7,728	34.28%	2,338	10.37%
2000	12,412	57.66%	7,487	34.78%	1,628	7.56%
2004	15,111	65.58%	7,524	32.65%	406	1.76%
2008	14,165	62.16%	8,186	35.92%	437	1.92%
2012	13,840	64.38%	7,040	32.75%	616	2.87%
2016	13,828	62.67%	6,317	28.63%	1,919	8.70%
2020	15,722	63.85%	8,214	33.36%	688	2.79%
2024	15,069	64.88%	7,734	33.30%	423	1.82%

Saline County is a Republican stronghold: the last Democrat to win a majority in the county was Lyndon Johnson in 1964, who was also the last Democrat to carry the state's electoral votes. Saline has voted for the statewide winner in every presidential election since 1872, including for James Weaver in 1892.

=== Laws ===
The county voted "No" on the 2022 Kansas abortion referendum, an anti-abortion ballot measure, by 55% to 45% despite backing Donald Trump with 64% of the vote to Joe Biden's 33% in the 2020 presidential election.

== Education ==
=== Colleges and universities ===
- Kansas State University Aerospace and Technology Campus in Salina
- Kansas Wesleyan University in Salina
- Salina Area Technical College in Salina

=== Unified school districts ===
- Salina USD 305
- Southeast of Saline USD 306
- Ell-Saline USD 307

School district office in neighboring county

- Twin Valley USD 240
- Solomon USD 393
- Smoky Valley USD 400

=== Private schools ===
- St. John's Military School
- Sacred Heart High School

== Communities ==
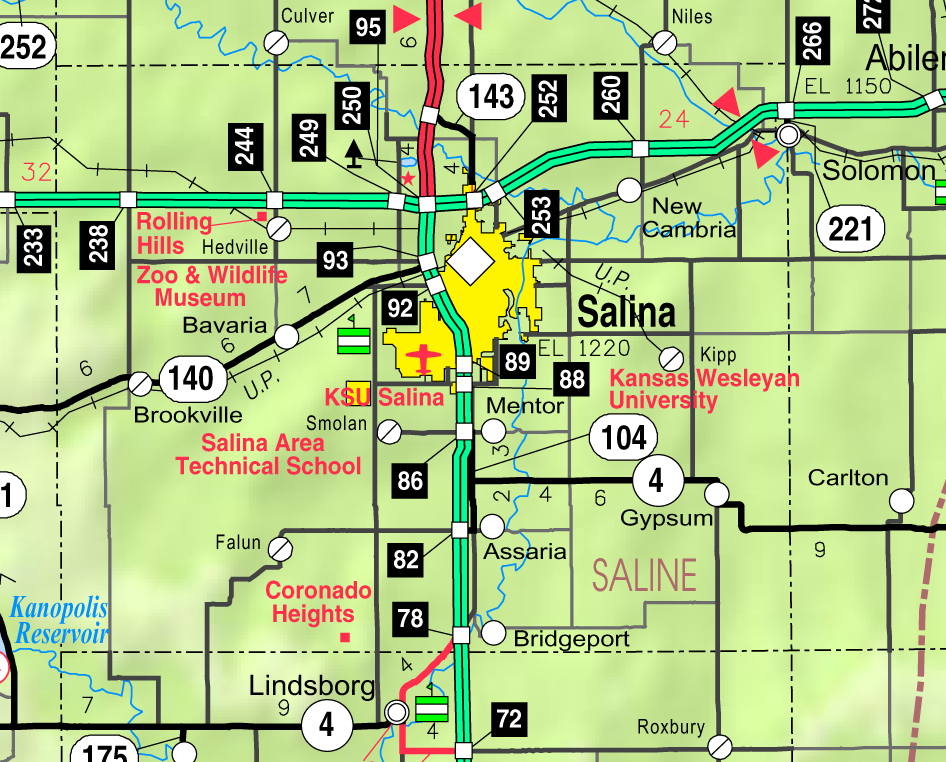
2005 map of Saline County (map legend)

List of townships / incorporated cities / unincorporated communities / extinct former communities within Saline County.

=== Cities ===
‡ means a community has portions in an adjacent county.

- Assaria
- Brookville
- Gypsum
- New Cambria
- Salina (county seat)
- Smolan
- Solomon‡

=== Unincorporated communities ===
† means a community is designated a Census-Designated Place (CDP) by the United States Census Bureau.

- Bavaria†
- Bridgeport†
- Falun†
- Glendale
- Hedville
- Kipp†
- Mentor†
- Salemsborg
- Shipton
- Trenton

=== Townships ===
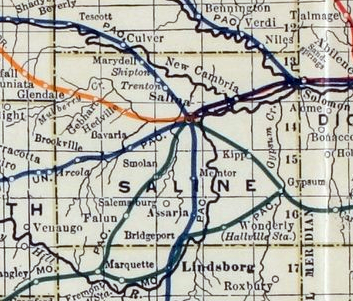
1915 railroad map of Saline County

Saline County is divided into eighteen townships. The city of Salina is considered governmentally independent and is excluded from the census figures for the townships. In the following table, the population center is the largest city (or cities) included in that township's population total, if it is of a significant size.

Sources: 2000 U.S. Gazetteer from the U.S. Census Bureau.
Township	FIPS	Population center	Population	Population density /km^{2} (/sq mi)	Land area km^{2} (sq mi)	Water area km^{2} (sq mi)	Water %	Geographic coordinates
Cambria	10100	New Cambria	450	5 (13)	93 (36)	0 (0)	0.16%	38°54′3″N 97°31′44″W
Dayton	17125		134	1 (4)	92 (36)	0 (0)	0.08%	38°55′0″N 97°25′18″W
Elm Creek	20650		828	9 (23)	92 (36)	0 (0)	0.39%	38°54′8″N 97°38′55″W
Eureka	21925	Gypsum	664	7 (18)	94 (36)	0 (0)	0.05%	38°43′20″N 97°25′36″W
Falun	22925		260	1 (4)	186 (72)	0 (0)	0.26%	38°39′26″N 97°47′14″W
Glendale	26475		104	1 (3)	93 (36)	0 (0)	0.30%	38°53′57″N 97°52′33″W
Greeley	28375		809	10 (26)	79 (31)	0 (0)	0.09%	38°50′21″N 97°32′35″W
Gypsum	29275		193	2 (5)	93 (36)	0 (0)	0.01%	38°39′35″N 97°25′22″W
Liberty	40350		183	2 (5)	93 (36)	0 (0)	0.44%	38°39′19″N 97°32′48″W
Ohio	52425		463	5 (13)	94 (36)	0 (0)	0.13%	38°49′12″N 97°45′9″W
Pleasant Valley	56625		422	5 (12)	93 (36)	0 (0)	0.43%	38°55′18″N 97°46′15″W
Smoky Hill	66050		324	5 (14)	59 (23)	0 (0)	0.10%	38°50′21″N 97°39′35″W
Smoky View	66075	Assaria	954	10 (27)	93 (36)	0 (0)	0.06%	38°39′25″N 97°37′34″W
Smolan	66125		749	9 (23)	85 (33)	0 (0)	0.15%	38°44′24″N 97°38′26″W
Solomon	66375		311	3 (9)	94 (36)	0 (0)	0.06%	38°49′56″N 97°26′14″W
Spring Creek	67500	Brookville	395	2 (6)	185 (72)	1 (0)	0.38%	38°46′42″N 97°51′47″W
Walnut	75125		553	6 (15)	93 (36)	1 (0)	0.79%	38°44′52″N 97°32′55″W
Washington	75725		122	1 (3)	93 (36)	0 (0)	0.04%	38°45′4″N 97°45′10″W

== See also ==
- National Register of Historic Places listings in Saline County, Kansas
- Rolling Hills Zoo

Community information for Kansas

- Kansas locations by per capita income
- List of counties in Kansas
- List of townships in Kansas
- List of cities in Kansas
- List of unincorporated communities in Kansas
- List of ghost towns in Kansas
