= Smolan Township, Kansas =

Township in Saline County, Kansas, U.S.

Smolan Township
- Township
- Location within Saline County
- Coordinates: 38.7364°N 97.6581°W
- Country: United States
- State: Kansas
- County: Saline
- Established: 1874

Government
  - District 4 County Commissioner: James Weese (R)

Area
  - Total: 31.682 sq mi (82.06 km^{2})
  - Land: 31.677 sq mi (82.04 km^{2})
  - Water: 0.005 sq mi (0.013 km^{2}) 0.02%

Population (2020)
  - Total: 647
  - Density: 20.4/sq mi (7.89/km^{2})
- Time zone: UTC-6 (CST)
  - Summer (DST): UTC-5 (CDT)
- Area code: 785
- GNIS feature ID: 476797

Smolan Township is a township in Saline County, Kansas, United States. As of the 2020 census, its population was 647.

== History ==
Smolan Township was organized in 1874 from Walnut Township. In 1868, Swedish settlers from Galesburg, Illinois settled in Smolan and Smoky View Townships.

== Geography ==
Smolan Township covers an area of 31.682 square miles (82.06 square kilometers). Dry Creek flows through it.

=== Communities ===
- Smolan
- part of Mentor

=== Adjacent townships ===
Smoky Hill Township, Saline County
Ohio Township, Saline County	northwest	north
Washington Township, Saline County	west	self	east	Walnut Township, Saline County
Falun Township, Saline County	southwest	south
Smoky View Township, McPherson County

== Transportation ==
=== Major highways ===
- I-135
- US-81
- K-4
- K-104
