= Glendale, Kansas =

Unincorporated community in Saline County, Kansas

- Unincorporated community
- Location within Saline County and Kansas

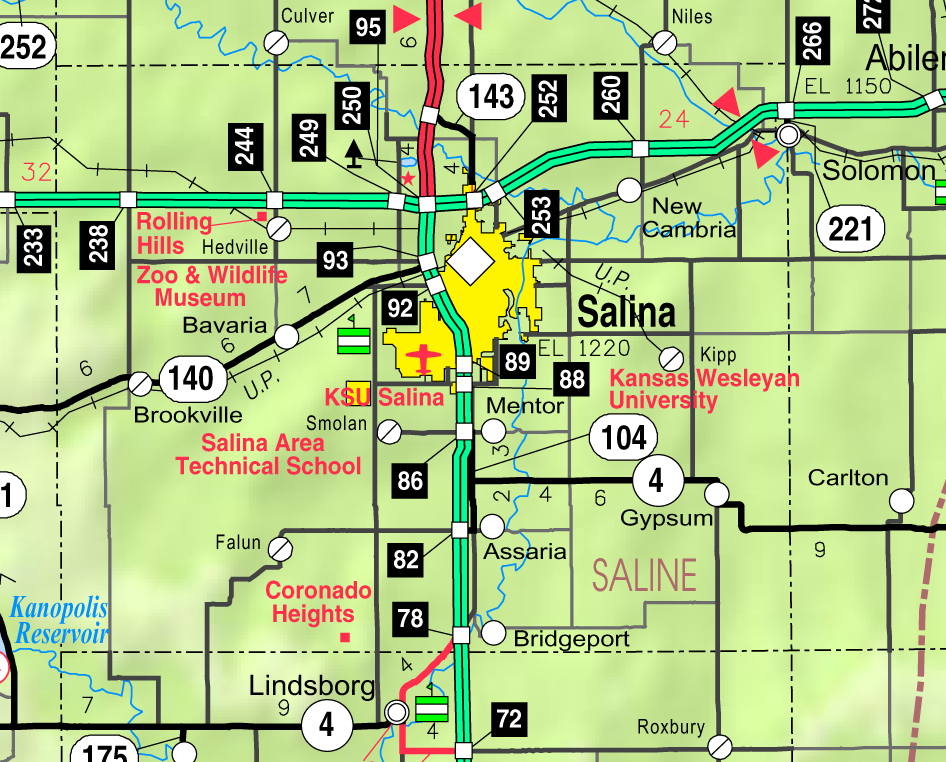
- KDOT map of Saline County (legend)
- Coordinates: 38°53′54″N 97°52′30.1″W
- Country: United States
- State: Kansas
- County: Saline
- Township: Glendale
- Elevation: 1,388 ft (423 m)
- Time zone: UTC-6 (CST)
  - Summer (DST): UTC-5 (CDT)
- ZIP Code: 67425
- Area code: 785
- FIPS code: 20-26450
- GNIS ID: 476626

Glendale is an unincorporated community in Saline County, Kansas, United States. It is located approximately 15 miles (24 km) northwest of Salina, along the Kansas and Oklahoma Railroad line, at the intersection of north Brookville and west Watkins roads, about 1.0 mile (1.6 km) north of I-70.

== Demographics ==
As a part of Saline County, Glendale is a part of the Salina micropolitan area.

== Education ==
The community is served by Twin Valley USD 240 public school district.
