= Center Township, Ottawa County, Kansas =

Township in Ottawa County, Kansas, U.S.

Center Township
- Township
- Location within Ottawa County
- Coordinates: 39.066697°N 97.770403°W
- Country: United States
- State: Kansas
- County: Ottawa

Area
  - Total: 35.639 sq mi (92.30 km^{2})
  - Land: 35.575 sq mi (92.14 km^{2})
  - Water: 0.064 sq mi (0.17 km^{2}) 0.18%
- Elevation: 1,368 ft (417 m)

Population (2020)
  - Total: 85
  - Density: 2.4/sq mi (0.92/km^{2})
- Time zone: UTC-6 (CST)
  - Summer (DST): UTC-5 (CDT)
- Area code: 785
- GNIS feature ID: 476278

Center Township is a township in Ottawa County, Kansas, United States. As of the 2020 census, its population was 85.

== Geography ==
Center Township covers an area of 35.639 square miles (92.30 square kilometers). The Solomon River flows through it.

=== Adjacent townships ===
- Garfield Township, Ottawa County (north)
- Concord Township, Ottawa County (east)
- Bennington Township, Ottawa County (southeast)
- Culver Township, Ottawa County (south)
- Morton Township, Ottawa County (southwest)
- Henry Township, Ottawa County (west)
- Fountain Township, Ottawa County (northwest)

== Transportation ==
=== Major highways ===
- K-106
