= Spring Creek Township, Saline County, Kansas =

Township in Saline County, Kansas, U.S.

Spring Creek Township
- Township
- Location within Saline County
- Coordinates: 38.787584°N 97.871736°W
- Country: United States
- State: Kansas
- County: Saline

Government
  - District 5 County Commissioner: Joe Hay Jr. (R)

Area
  - Total: 71.936 sq mi (186.31 km^{2})
  - Land: 71.784 sq mi (185.92 km^{2})
  - Water: 0.152 sq mi (0.39 km^{2}) 0.21%

Population (2020)
  - Total: 447
  - Density: 6.23/sq mi (2.40/km^{2})
- Time zone: UTC-6 (CST)
  - Summer (DST): UTC-5 (CDT)
- Area code: 785
- GNIS feature ID: 476779

Spring Creek Township is a township in Saline County, Kansas, United States. As of the 2020 census, its population was 447.

== History ==
Spring Creek Township had three other townships created from parts of it: Ohio Township in 1871, Pleasant Valley Township in 1873, and Summit Township in 1880. Summit Township would later be absorbed into Falun Township in the 1960s, which it was also created from.

== Geography ==
Spring Creek Township covers an area of 71.936 square miles (186.31 square kilometers). Mulberry Creek flows through it.

=== Communities ===
- Brookville

=== Adjacent townships ===
Glendale Township, Saline County
Madison Township, Lincoln County	northwest	north	northeast	Pleasant Valley Township, Saline County
Carneiro Township, Ellsworth County; Mulberry Township, Ellsworth County	west	self	east	Ohio Township, Saline County
Empire Township, Ellsworth County	southwest	south	southeast	Washington Township, Saline County
Falun Township, Saline County

== Transportation ==
=== Major highways ===
- K-140
