= K143 =

K143 or K-143 may refer to:

- K-143 (Kansas highway), a state highway in Kansas
- HMCS Louisburg (K143), a former Canadian Navy ship
