= Elm Creek Township, Saline County, Kansas =

Township in Saline County, Kansas, U.S.

Elm Creek Township
- Township
- Location within Saline County
- Coordinates: 38.919113°N 97.659387°W
- Country: United States
- State: Kansas
- County: Saline
- Established: 1871

Government
  - District 1 County Commissioner: Tom Arpke (R)

Area
  - Total: 35.471 sq mi (91.87 km^{2})
  - Land: 35.372 sq mi (91.61 km^{2})
  - Water: 0.099 sq mi (0.26 km^{2}) 0.28%

Population (2020)
  - Total: 816
  - Density: 23.1/sq mi (8.91/km^{2})
- Time zone: UTC-6 (CST)
  - Summer (DST): UTC-5 (CDT)
- Area code: 785
- GNIS feature ID: 476639

Elm Creek Township is a township in Saline County, Kansas, United States. As of the 2020 census, its population was 816.

== History ==
Elm Creek Township was organized in 1871 from Smoky Hill Township. Cambria Township was separated from Elm Creek Township in 1878.

== Geography ==
Elm Creek Township covers an area of 35.471 square miles (91.87 square kilometers). The Saline River flows through it, as well as Mulberry Creek and Dry Creek.

=== Communities ===
- Trenton

=== Adjacent townships ===
Bennington Township, Ottawa County
Culver Township, Ottawa County	northwest	north
Pleasant Valley Township, Saline County	west	self	east	Cambria Township, Saline County
Ohio Township, Saline County	southwest	south	southeast	Greeley Township, Saline County
Smoky Hill Township, Saline County

== Transportation ==
=== Major highways ===
- I-70
- I-135
- US-40
- US-81
- K-143
