= Bennington Township, Kansas =

Township in Ottawa County, Kansas, U.S.

Bennington Township
- Township
- Location within Ottawa County
- Coordinates: 39.000927°N 97.64464°W
- Country: United States
- State: Kansas
- County: Ottawa

Area
  - Total: 42.047 sq mi (108.90 km^{2})
  - Land: 42.022 sq mi (108.84 km^{2})
  - Water: 0.025 sq mi (0.065 km^{2}) 0.06%
- Elevation: 1,286 ft (392 m)

Population (2020)
  - Total: 1,219
  - Density: 29.01/sq mi (11.20/km^{2})
- Time zone: UTC-6 (CST)
  - Summer (DST): UTC-5 (CDT)
- Area code: 785
- GNIS feature ID: 476459

Bennington Township is a township in Ottawa County, Kansas, United States. As of the 2020 census, its population was 1,219.

== Geography ==
Bennington Township covers an area of 42.047 square miles (108.90 square kilometers). The Solomon River flows through it.

=== Communities ===
- Bennington

=== Adjacent townships ===
- Concord Township, Ottawa County (north)
- Richland Township, Ottawa County (northeast)
- Buckeye Township, Ottawa County (east)
- Cambria Township, Saline County (southeast)
- Elm Creek Township, Saline County (south)
- Pleasant Valley Township, Saline County (southwest)
- Culver Township, Saline County (west)
- Center Township, Ottawa County (northwest)

== Transportation ==
=== Major highways ===
- US-81
- K-18
