= Culver Township, Kansas =

Township in Ottawa County, Kansas, U.S.

Culver Township
- Township
- Location within Ottawa County
- Coordinates: 39.000435°N 97.763935°W
- Country: United States
- State: Kansas
- County: Ottawa

Area
  - Total: 36.214 sq mi (93.79 km^{2})
  - Land: 36.182 sq mi (93.71 km^{2})
  - Water: 0.032 sq mi (0.083 km^{2}) 0.09%
- Elevation: 1,293 ft (394 m)

Population (2020)
  - Total: 239
  - Density: 6.61/sq mi (2.55/km^{2})
- Time zone: UTC-6 (CST)
  - Summer (DST): UTC-5 (CDT)
- Area code: 785
- GNIS feature ID: 476457

Culver Township is a township in Ottawa County, Kansas, United States. As of the 2020 census, its population was 239.

== Geography ==
Culver Township covers an area of 36.214 square miles (93.79 square kilometers). The Saline River flows through it.

=== Communities ===
- Culver

=== Adjacent townships ===
- Center Township, Ottawa County (north)
- Concord Township, Ottawa County (northeast)
- Bennington Township, Ottawa County (east)
- Elm Creek Township, Saline County (southeast)
- Pleasant Valley Township, Saline County (south)
- Glendale Township, Saline County (southwest)
- Morton Township, Ottawa County (west)
- Henry Township, Ottawa County (northwest)

== Transportation ==
=== Major highways ===
- K-18
- K-106
