= Concord Township, Ottawa County, Kansas =

Township in Ottawa County, Kansas, U.S.

Concord Township
- Township
- Location within Ottawa County
- Coordinates: 39.078629°N 97.644943°W
- Country: United States
- State: Kansas
- County: Ottawa

Area
  - Total: 34.715 sq mi (89.91 km^{2})
  - Land: 34.691 sq mi (89.85 km^{2})
  - Water: 0.024 sq mi (0.062 km^{2}) 0.07%
- Elevation: 1,274 ft (388 m)

Population (2020)
  - Total: 247
  - Density: 7.12/sq mi (2.75/km^{2})
- Time zone: UTC-6 (CST)
  - Summer (DST): UTC-5 (CDT)
- Area code: 785
- GNIS feature ID: 476282

Concord Township is a township in Ottawa County, Kansas, United States. As of the 2020 census, its population was 247.

== Geography ==
Concord Township covers an area of 34.715 square miles (89.91 square kilometers). The Solomon River flows through it.

=== Communities ===
- Lindsey

=== Adjacent townships ===
- Blaine Township, Ottawa County (north)
- Grant Township, Ottawa County (northeast)
- Richland Township, Ottawa County (east)
- Bennington Township, Ottawa County (south)
- Culver Township, Ottawa County (southwest)
- Center Township, Ottawa County (west)

== Transportation ==
=== Major highways ===
- US-81
- K-106
