= Smoky Hill Township, Saline County, Kansas =

Township in Saline County, Kansas, U.S.

Smoky Hill Township
- Township
- Location within Saline County
- Coordinates: 38.8319°N 97.6544°W
- Country: United States
- State: Kansas
- County: Saline
- Established: 1871

Government
  - District 5 County Commissioner: Joe Hay Jr. (R)

Area
  - Total: 22.355 sq mi (57.90 km^{2})
  - Land: 22.338 sq mi (57.86 km^{2})
  - Water: 0.017 sq mi (0.044 km^{2}) 0.08%

Population (2020)
  - Total: 239
  - Density: 10.7/sq mi (4.13/km^{2})
- Time zone: UTC-6 (CST)
  - Summer (DST): UTC-5 (CDT)
- Area code: 785
- GNIS feature ID: 476796

Smoky Hill Township is a township in Saline County, Kansas, United States. As of the 2020 census, its population was 239.

== History ==
Smoky Hill Township was organized in 1871 from Elm Creek Township. Greeley Township was organized from part of Smoky Hill Township in 1879. In the 1970s there was a boundary adjustment between it and Greeley Township.

== Geography ==
Smoky Hill Township covers an area of 22.355 square miles (57.90 square kilometers). Mulberry Creek, Spring Creek, and Dry Creek flow through it.

=== Adjacent townships ===
Elm Creek Township, Saline County
Pleasant Valley Township, Saline County	northwest	north	northeast	Cambria Township, Saline County
Ohio Township, Saline County	west	self	east	Greeley Township, Saline County
Washington Township, Saline County	southwest	south
Walnut Township, Saline County

== Transportation ==
=== Major highways ===
- I-135
- US-81
- K-140
