= Rolling Hills Zoo =

- Interactive map of Rolling Hills Zoo
- 38.853341°N 97.764771°W
- Location: Salina, Kansas, USA
- No. of species: 100+
- Memberships: AZA
- Website: www.rollinghillszoo.org

The Rolling Hills Zoo is a medium-sized zoo near Salina, Kansas. It is located in rural Saline County, 6.0 miles (9.7 km) west of the I-70 and I-135 interchange, and 2.5 miles (4.0 km) south of I-70 Exit 244 through the unincorporated community of Hedville. It houses over 100 species of animals in a number of exhibits. The zoo also includes a 64,000 square foot wildlife museum.

The Rolling Hills Zoo is an accredited member of the Association of Zoos and Aquariums (AZA). Admission includes both the zoo and the wildlife museum. The museum also contains the Helen L Graves Hideaway Hollow play area as well as the Earl Bane gallery, which is dedicated to traveling exhibits.

== History ==
In the early 1980s, Salina businessman Charlie Walker purchased a section of ground in western Saline County. A large barn was built to house a number of Belgian horses and Rolling Hills Ranch was born. During the early years, hundreds of schoolchildren visited the “Main Barn” each year to learn about the large draft horses.

In the late 1980s, Walker decided to add a few animals to the barn, such as two black bear cubs, a few llamas, and a lioness. The tours were no longer requested only by school groups. Family reunions, class reunions, and other groups were requesting tours of the Main Barn to see these animals.

In 1995, the exotic animal portion of the ranch formally broke its ties with Rolling Hills Ranch and became a private, non-profit foundation dedicated to the conservation and propagation of rare and endangered species. The animal collection, land, and equipment were donated into the newly formed foundation, Rolling Hills Refuge Wildlife Conservation Center, and construction of the zoo began in earnest. After five years of construction, the zoo opened to the public in the fall of 1999.

In 2000, the vision was expanded to include a wildlife museum. A 64,000-square-foot building was constructed. A portion of this building was designated as a conference center that could be rented out for business meetings, receptions, or used for the zoo’s own events. The conference center held its first event in April 2002.

Construction began on the interior portion of the wildlife museum in 2003. The museum also offers a 2,000-square-foot travelling exhibit area, a children’s exploration room, and a domed ADM Theater. The museum opened to the public in March 2005.

In 2009, the park underwent an official name change to Rolling Hills Wildlife Adventure. Rolling Hills Zoo is a public, non-profit organization.
