= Cambria Township, Kansas =

Township in Saline County, Kansas, U.S.

Cambria Township
- Township
- Location within Saline County
- Coordinates: 38.9178°N 97.5292°W
- Country: United States
- State: Kansas
- County: Saline
- Established: 1878

Government
  - District 1 County Commissioner: Tom Arpke (R)

Area
  - Total: 35.816 sq mi (92.76 km^{2})
  - Land: 35.781 sq mi (92.67 km^{2})
  - Water: 0.035 sq mi (0.091 km^{2}) 0.10%

Population (2020)
  - Total: 420
  - Density: 12/sq mi (4.5/km^{2})
- Time zone: UTC-6 (CST)
  - Summer (DST): UTC-5 (CDT)
- Area code: 785
- GNIS feature ID: 476650

Cambria Township is a township in Saline County, Kansas, United States. As of the 2020 census, its population was 420.

== History ==
Cambria Township was organized in 1878 from Elk Creek Township.

== Geography ==
Cambria Township covers an area of 35.816 square miles (92.76 square kilometers). The Saline River runs through it.

=== Communities ===
- New Cambria

=== Adjacent townships ===
Buckeye Township, Ottawa County
Bennington Township, Ottawa County	northwest	north	northeast	Lincoln Township, Ottawa County
Elm Creek Township, Saline County	west	self	east	Dayton Township, Saline County
Smoky Hill Township, Saline County	southwest	south	southeast	Solomon Township, Saline County
Greely Township, Saline County

== Transportation ==
=== Major highways ===
- I-70
- US-40
