= Glendale Township, Kansas =

Township in Saline County, Kansas, U.S.

Glendale Township
- Township
- Location within Saline County
- Coordinates: 38.9139°N 97.8650°W
- Country: United States
- State: Kansas
- County: Saline
- Established: 1880

Government
  - District 5 County Commissioner: Joe Hay Jr. (R)

Area
  - Total: 36.108 sq mi (93.52 km^{2})
  - Land: 36.031 sq mi (93.32 km^{2})
  - Water: 0.077 sq mi (0.20 km^{2}) 0.21%

Population (2020)
  - Total: 108
  - Density: 3.00/sq mi (1.16/km^{2})
- Time zone: UTC-6 (CST)
  - Summer (DST): UTC-5 (CDT)
- Area code: 785
- GNIS feature ID: 476622

Glendale Township is a township in Saline County, Kansas, United States. As of the 2020 census, its population was 108.

== History ==
Glendale Township was organized in 1880 from Pleasant Valley Township.

== Geography ==
Glendale Township covers an area of 36.108 square miles (93.52 square kilometers). Mulberry Creek flows through it.

=== Communities ===
- Glendale

=== Adjacent townships ===
Morton Township, Ottawa County
Colorado Township, Lincoln County	northwest	north	northeast	Culver Township, Ottawa County
Madison Township, Lincoln County	west	self	east	Pleasant Valley Township, Saline County
Mulberry Township, Ellsworth County	southwest	south	southeast	Ohio Township, Saline County
Spring Creek Township, Saline County

== Transportation ==
=== Major highways ===
- I-70
- US-40
