= Greeley Township, Saline County, Kansas =

Township in Saline County, Kansas, U.S.

Greeley Township
- Township
- Location within Saline County
- Coordinates: 38.8275°N 97.5347°W
- Country: United States
- State: Kansas
- County: Saline
- Established: 1879

Government
  - District 2 County Commissioner: Annie Grevas (R)

Area
  - Total: 29.233 sq mi (75.71 km^{2})
  - Land: 29.213 sq mi (75.66 km^{2})
  - Water: 0.02 sq mi (0.052 km^{2}) 0.07%

Population (2020)
  - Total: 753
  - Density: 25.8/sq mi (9.95/km^{2})
- Time zone: UTC-6 (CST)
  - Summer (DST): UTC-5 (CDT)
- Area code: 785
- GNIS feature ID: 476832

Greeley Township is a township in Saline County, Kansas, United States. As of the 2020 census, its population was 753.

== History ==
Greeley Township was organized in 1879 from Smoky Hill Township. In the 1970s there was a boundary adjustment between it and Smoky Hill Township.

== Geography ==
Greeley Township covers an area of 29.233 square miles (75.71 square kilometers). The Smoky Hill River and Saline River flow through it.

=== Adjacent townships ===
Cambria Township, Saline County
Elm Creek Township, Saline County	northwest	north	northeast	Dayton Township, Saline County
Smoky Hill Township, Saline County	west	self	east	Solomon Township, Saline County
		south	southeast	Eureka Township, Saline County
Walnut Township, Saline County
