= Shipton, Kansas =

Unincorporated community in Saline County, Kansas

Coordinates: 38°54′50″N 97°40′56″W

Shipton is an unincorporated community in Saline County, Kansas, United States. It is located northwest of Salina, approximately 0.75 mi (1.2 km) west of the intersection of Halstead Road and Shipton Road, next to an abandoned railroad.

== History ==
The post office in Shipton was discontinued in 1895.

== Education ==
The community is served by Ell-Saline USD 307 public school district.
