= Washington Township, Saline County, Kansas =

Township in Saline County, Kansas, U.S.

Washington Township
- Township
- Location within Saline County
- Coordinates: 38.740°N 97.762°W
- Country: United States
- State: Kansas
- County: Saline
- Established: 1874

Government
  - District 4 County Commissioner: James Weese (R)

Area
  - Total: 36.171 sq mi (93.68 km^{2})
  - Land: 36.138 sq mi (93.60 km^{2})
  - Water: 0.033 sq mi (0.085 km^{2}) 0.09%

Population (2020)
  - Total: 144
  - Density: 3.98/sq mi (1.54/km^{2})
- Time zone: UTC-6 (CST)
  - Summer (DST): UTC-5 (CDT)
- Area code: 785
- GNIS feature ID: 476788

Washington Township is a township in Saline County, Kansas, United States. As of the 2020 census, its population was 144.

== History ==
Washington Township was organized in 1874 from Ohio Township.

== Geography ==
Washington Township covers an area of 36.171 square miles (93.68 square kilometers). Spring Creek flows through it.

=== Adjacent townships ===
Ohio Township, Saline County
		north	northeast	Smoky Hill Township, Saline County
Spring Creek Township, Saline County	west	self	east	Smolan Township, Saline County
		south
Falun Township, Saline County

== Transportation ==
=== Major highways ===
- K-140
