= National Register of Historic Places listings in Saline County, Kansas =

Location of Saline County in Kansas

This is a list of the National Register of Historic Places listings in Saline County, Kansas.

This is intended to be a complete list of the properties and districts on the National Register of Historic Places in Saline County, Kansas, United States. The locations of National Register properties and districts for which the latitude and longitude coordinates are included below, may be seen in a map.

There are 20 properties and districts listed on the National Register in the county, including 1 National Historic Landmark. At least one other site that was once listed has been removed.

This National Park Service list is complete through NPS recent listings posted November 13, 2026.

== Current listings ==
	Name on the Register	Image	Date listed	Location	City or town	Description
1	Brookville Grade School	Brookville Grade School	November 2, 1982 (#82000419)	Jewitt and Anderson Sts. 38°46′23″N 97°52′13″W	Brookville	
2	Christ Cathedral	Christ Cathedral	July 6, 2010 (#10000429)	138 South 8th St. 38°50′21″N 97°36′43″W	Salina	
3	Coronado Heights	Coronado Heights	October 20, 2010 (#10000847)	12th and Coronado Heights Rd. 38°36′48″N 97°42′12″W	Lindsborg	New Deal-Era Resources of Kansas MPS
4	Paul Laurence Dunbar School	Paul Laurence Dunbar School	April 8, 2025 (#100011703)	509 East Elm Street; 38°50′43″N 97°36′14″W	Salina	
5	Flanders-Lee House and Carriage House	Flanders-Lee House and Carriage House	August 20, 1987 (#87001406)	200 S. 7th St. 38°50′17″N 97°36′38″W	Salina	
6	Fox-Watson Theater Building	Fox-Watson Theater Building	August 4, 1988 (#88001171)	155 S. Santa Fe Ave. 38°50′17″N 97°36′32″W	Salina	
7	Hobbs Creek Truss Leg Bedstead Bridge	Hobbs Creek Truss Leg Bedstead Bridge	October 12, 2004 (#04001143)	On Hobbs Creek Rd., 0.6 miles west of its junction with Solomon Rd. 38°38′17″N 97°22′59″W	Gypsum	
8	Lakewood Park Bridge	Lakewood Park Bridge	June 9, 2004 (#04000579)	One Lakewood Dr., 0.01 miles north of its junction with Iron Ave. 38°50′28″N 97°35′22″W	Salina	
9	H.D. Lee Company Complex	H.D. Lee Company Complex	July 3, 2008 (#08000618)	248 N. Santa Fe; 38°50′38″N 97°36′34″W	Salina	
10	Lowell School	Lowell School	October 2, 2020 (#100005625)	1009 South Highland Ave. 38°49′09″N 97°36′41″W	Salina	
11	Masonic Temple	Masonic Temple	March 9, 2000 (#00000192)	336 S. Santa Fe Ave. 38°50′05″N 97°36′33″W	Salina	
12	Mount Barbara	Mount Barbara	April 14, 1995 (#95000445)	100 Mt. Barbara; 38°50′21″N 97°34′55″W	Salina	Prairie School house built in 1916-18.
13	National Bank of America	National Bank of America	August 24, 2020 (#100004923)	100 South Santa Fe Ave. 38°50′25″N 97°36′33″W	Salina	
14	The Norton Apartments	The Norton Apartments	March 26, 2018 (#100002246)	1111 & 1115 E Iron Ave. 38°50′26″N 97°35′36″W	Salina	
15	Pioneer Hall, Kansas Wesleyan University	Pioneer Hall, Kansas Wesleyan University	January 4, 2023 (#100008519)	100 East Claflin Ave. 38°48′49″N 97°36′35″W	Salina	
16	John H. Prescott House	John H. Prescott House	May 17, 1976 (#76000838)	211 W. Prescott Ave. 38°49′48″N 97°36′40″W	Salina	
17	Roosevelt-Lincoln Junior High School	Roosevelt-Lincoln Junior High School	December 20, 2006 (#06001169)	210 W. Mulberry St. 38°50′22″N 97°37′00″W	Salina	
18	A.J. Schwartz House	A.J. Schwartz House	April 13, 1973 (#73000774)	636 E. Iron St. 38°50′25″N 97°36′04″W	Salina	
19	US Post Office and Federal Building-Salina	US Post Office and Federal Building-Salina	July 18, 1989 (#89000793)	211 W. Iron; 38°50′25″N 97°36′40″W	Salina	
20	Whiteford (Price) Archeological Site	Whiteford (Price) Archeological Site	October 15, 1966 (#66000350)	East of Salina; 38°51′39″N 97°31′36″W	Salina	

== Former listings ==
	Name on the Register	Image	Date listed	Date removed	Location	City or town	Description
1	Brookville Hotel	Brookville Hotel	January 7, 1972 (#72000525)	January 2, 2013	Perry St. 38°46′23″N 97°52′01″W	Brookville	Removed due to significant alterations.

== See also ==
- List of National Historic Landmarks in Kansas
- National Register of Historic Places listings in Kansas
