= Pleasant Valley Township, Saline County, Kansas =

Township in Saline County, Kansas, U.S.

Pleasant Valley Township
- Township
- Location within Saline County
- Coordinates: 38.9078°N 97.7714°W
- Country: United States
- State: Kansas
- County: Saline
- Established: 1873

Government
  - District 5 County Commissioner: Joe Hay Jr. (R)

Area
  - Total: 36.151 sq mi (93.63 km^{2})
  - Land: 36.071 sq mi (93.42 km^{2})
  - Water: 0.08 sq mi (0.21 km^{2}) 0.22%

Population (2020)
  - Total: 364
  - Density: 10.1/sq mi (3.90/km^{2})
- Time zone: UTC-6 (CST)
  - Summer (DST): UTC-5 (CDT)
- Area code: 785
- GNIS feature ID: 476630

Pleasant Valley Township is a township in Saline County, Kansas, United States. As of the 2020 census, its population was 364.

== History ==
Pleasant Valley Township was organized in 1873 from Spring Creek Township. Glendale Township was established from part of Pleasant Valley Township in 1880.

== Geography ==
Pleasant Valley Township covers an area of 36.151 square miles (93.63 square kilometers). The Saline River flows through it, as well as Mulberry Creek.

=== Adjacent townships ===
Culver Township, Ottawa County
Morton Township, Ottawa County	northwest	north	northeast	Bennington Township, Ottawa County
Glendale Township, Saline County	west	self	east	Elm Creek Township, Saline County
Spring Creek Township, Saline County	southwest	south	southeast	Smoky Hill Township, Saline County
Ohio Township, Saline County

== Transportation ==
=== Major highways ===
- I-70
- US-40
