= Ohio Township, Saline County, Kansas =

Township in Saline County, Kansas, U.S.

Ohio Township
- Township
- Location within Saline County

- Location in Kansas, United States
- Coordinates: 38.8347°N 97.7708°W
- Country: United States
- State: Kansas
- County: Saline
- Established: 1871

Government
  - District 5 County Commissioner: Joe Hay Jr. (R)

Area
  - Total: 36.256 sq mi (93.90 km^{2})
  - Land: 36.226 sq mi (93.82 km^{2})
  - Water: 0.03 sq mi (0.078 km^{2}) 0.08%

Population (2020)
  - Total: 434
  - Density: 12.0/sq mi (4.63/km^{2})
- Time zone: UTC-6 (CST)
  - Summer (DST): UTC-5 (CDT)
- Area code: 785
- GNIS feature ID: 476787

Ohio Township is a township in Saline County, Kansas, United States. As of the 2020 census, its population was 434.

== History ==
Ohio Township was organized in 1871 from Spring Creek Township. Washington Township was established from part of Ohio Township in 1874.

== Geography ==
Ohio Township covers an area of 36.256 square miles (93.90 square kilometers). Mulberry Creek and Spring Creek flow through it.

=== Communities ===
- Bavaria
- Hedville

=== Adjacent townships ===
Pleasant Valley Township, Saline County
Glendale Township, Saline County	northwest	north	northeast	Elm Creek Township, Saline County
Spring Creek Township, Saline County	west	self	east	Smoky Hill Township, Saline County
		south	southeast	Smolan Township, Saline County
Washington Township, Saline County

== Transportation ==
=== Major highways ===
- K-140
