= Hedville, Kansas =

Unincorporated community in Saline County, Kansas

- Unincorporated community
- Location within Saline County and Kansas

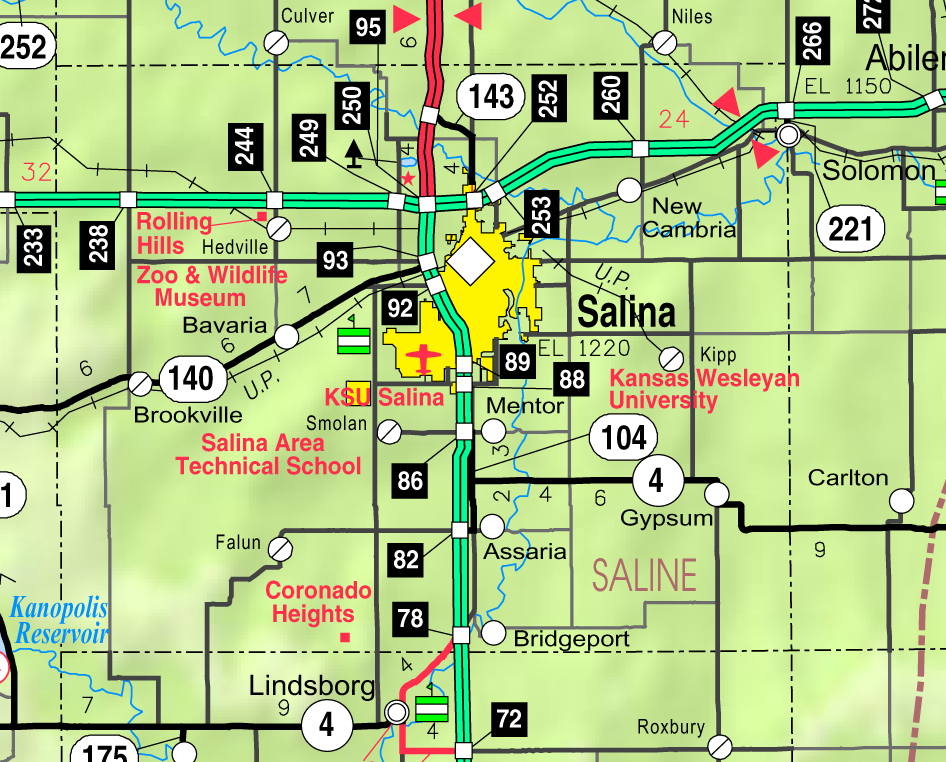
- KDOT map of Saline County (legend)
- Coordinates: 38°51′46″N 97°45′41″W
- Country: United States
- State: Kansas
- County: Saline
- Elevation: 1,273 ft (388 m)
- Time zone: UTC-6 (CST)
  - Summer (DST): UTC-5 (CDT)
- ZIP Code: 67401
- Area code: 785
- FIPS code: 20-31250
- GNIS ID: 476784

Hedville is an unincorporated community in Ohio Township, Saline County, Kansas, United States. It lies along Hedville Road and a Kansas and Oklahoma Railroad line, 1.0 mile (1.6 km) south of Interstate 70, northwest of Salina. The Rolling Hills Zoo is located approximately 1.0 mile (1.6 km) south of the community.

== Geography ==
Mulberry Creek flows through the community. Its elevation is 1,270 feet (387 m), and it is located at 38°51′46″N 97°45′41″W (38.8627816, -97.7614282).

== Demographics ==
As a part of Saline County, Hedville is a part of the Salina, Kansas micropolitan area.

== Education ==
The community is served by Ell–Saline USD 307 public school district.
