= Falun Township =

Falun Township may refer to:

- Falun Township, Saline County, Kansas
- Falun Township, Roseau County, Minnesota
