= Jeremy Petty =

American racing driver

- Born: August 31, 1982 (age 44) Smolan, Kansas, U.S.

ARCA Menards Series career
- Debut season: 2005
- Former teams: Wayne Peterson Racing, Promotion Associates
- Starts: 26
- Wins: 0
- Poles: 0
- Best finish: 13th in 2009
- Finished last season: 136th (2012)

NASCAR FedEx Freight Truck Series career
- 1 race run over 1 year
- 2010 position: 94th
- Best finish: 94th (2010)
- First race: 2010 Too Tough To Tame 200 (Darlington)
| Wins | Top tens | Poles |
|---|---|---|
| 0 | 0 | 0 |
- Statistics up to date as of January 3, 2025.

Jeremy Petty (born August 31, 1982) is an American professional stock car racing driver, crew chief and team executive. He works for MBM Motorsports as the crew chief of their No. 66 Ford in the ARCA Menards Series driven by Derek White. He last worked as the competition director for Maples Motorsports, an ARCA Menards Series team. Petty previously competed in the ARCA Series as a driver, including running one full season in 2009 for Hixson Motorsports. He also made one attempt in the Truck Series and planned to attempt a Nationwide Series race prior to withdrawing. As an ARCA crew chief, he worked for CCM Racing and Fast Track Racing.

== Racing career ==
=== Driving career ===
His father Joe Petty and grandfather Jack Petty were both accomplished drivers who won a combined 11 championships and 340 wins in various series. Petty, who was always an athletic person, started into racing at the age of ten years by becoming a Colorado State Champion Soap Box Derby driver. This led to various other forms of racing such as go-karts, vintage race cars, and IMCA type modifieds. In 2001, Petty started his racing career racing modifieds at various dirt tracks throughout Oklahoma and Kansas. In 2002, he tried asphalt racing at the Dodge City Raceway Park. Petty went on to win taking his first “A” feature race in just his ninth career start.

In 2003, Petty concentrated his racing efforts to asphalt at Dodge City Raceway Park, where he finished third in points and was also rookie of the year in the modified division. In 2004 Petty won a record seventeen straight feature wins on the asphalt. He went on to win the overall points championship at J.R.P. Speedway in Tulsa, OK, and the Missouri Cup.

In 2005, Petty started racing in what was then known as the ARCA Re/Max Series with his own team at the dirt race at DuQuoin. The car was a Chevrolet and used the No. 65. He also was set to compete at Salem driving the Roulo Brothers Racing No. 39, but he withdrew. The only race Petty ran the following year was his home track of Kansas, where he finished 33rd after a crash driving the No. 2 Pontiac for Hixson Motorsports.

Petty brought back his own team in 2007, switching manufacturers to Dodge and driving the No. 21 using owner points from Bowsher Motorsports in two races, which were Iowa and Gateway. Additionally, he made one other attempt that year at DuQuoin, but he did not qualify driving the No. 07 for Corrie Stott.

2008 saw Petty enter two races again. He did not finish the race at Iowa driving the No. 29 for Hixson, ending up in 38th place, and did not qualify for Kansas in Norm Benning's No. 8 car.

In 2009, his first full season in the series, Petty finished thirteenth in the final points standings, driving the No. 23 Chevrolet/Dodge for Hixson Motorsports. He did not return to the team in 2010, and was without a ride all year until he made his Truck Series debut in the No. 01 for Daisy Ramirez Motorsports at Darlington, surprisingly earning a top-twenty finish in seventeenth. He did not race in ARCA in 2011, either, but he did return to Kansas to attempt to qualify for his first Nationwide Series race that year, but after a crash in practice left his only car (they had no backup) of the weekend damaged, he and the No. 68 Fleur-de-Lis Motorsports team had to withdraw.

Petty's most recent start as a driver came at the ARCA race at Kansas in 2012, driving the No. 27 for Barry Fitzgerald's Promotion Associates team. He also had attempted to make the season-opening race at Daytona driving Wayne Peterson's No. 06, but did not qualify.

=== Crew chiefing career ===
In 2019, Petty began crew chiefing in the ARCA Series for CCM Racing, owned by driver Eric Caudell who drove the team's No. 7 car. In 2023 and 2024, he also crew chiefed select races on Fast Track Racing's No. 12 car. In 2025, Petty was named competition director of the new Maples Motorsports team, which was formed by 2024 Fast Track driver Michael Maples. Ryan Roulette, one of the drivers Petty crew chiefed on the No. 12 car in 2024, also moved over with him to Maples Motorsports. Petty moved to MBM Motorsports in 2026, serving as the crew chief of the team's ARCA car, the No. 66, which was driven by Derek White in the season opener at Daytona.

== Personal life ==
Petty was born in Salina, Kansas on August 31, 1982, he has no relation with NASCAR champion Richard Petty. He resides in Smolan, Kansas near his parents. He attended Brown Mackie College in Salina, Kansas where he was awarded a scholarship to play baseball. He pitched for the Brown Mackie Lions baseball team and received a degree in business management in 2003.

== Motorsports career results ==
=== NASCAR ===
(key) (Bold – Pole position awarded by qualifying time. Italics – Pole position earned by points standings or practice time. * – Most laps led.)

==== Nationwide Series ====
NASCAR Nationwide Series results
| Year | Team | No. | Make | 1 | 2 | 3 | 4 | 5 | 6 | 7 | 8 | 9 | 10 | 11 | 12 | 13 | 14 | 15 | 16 | 17 | 18 | 19 | 20 | 21 | 22 | 23 | 24 | 25 | 26 | 27 | 28 | 29 | 30 | 31 | 32 | 33 | 34 | NNSC | Pts | Ref |
|---|---|---|---|---|---|---|---|---|---|---|---|---|---|---|---|---|---|---|---|---|---|---|---|---|---|---|---|---|---|---|---|---|---|---|---|---|---|---|---|---|
| 2011 | Fleur-de-lis Motorsports | 68 | Chevy | DAY | PHO | LVS | BRI | CAL | TEX | TAL | NSH | RCH | DAR | DOV | IOW | CLT | CHI | MCH | ROA | DAY | KEN | NHA | NSH | IRP | IOW | GLN | CGV | BRI | ATL | RCH | CHI | DOV | KAN; Wth | CLT | TEX | PHO | HOM | N/A | – | |

==== Camping World Truck Series ====
NASCAR Camping World Truck Series results
| Year | Team | No. | Make | 1 | 2 | 3 | 4 | 5 | 6 | 7 | 8 | 9 | 10 | 11 | 12 | 13 | 14 | 15 | 16 | 17 | 18 | 19 | 20 | 21 | 22 | 23 | 24 | 25 | NCWTC | Pts | Ref |
|---|---|---|---|---|---|---|---|---|---|---|---|---|---|---|---|---|---|---|---|---|---|---|---|---|---|---|---|---|---|---|---|
| 2010 | Daisy Ramirez Motorsports | 01 | Chevy | DAY | ATL | MAR | NSH | KAN | DOV | CLT | TEX | MCH | IOW | GTY | IRP | POC | NSH | DAR; 17 | BRI | CHI | KEN | NHA | LVS | MAR | TAL | TEX | PHO | HOM | 94th | 112 | |

=== ARCA Racing Series ===
(key) (Bold – Pole position awarded by qualifying time. Italics – Pole position earned by points standings or practice time. * – Most laps led.)

ARCA Racing Series results
| Year | Team | No. | Make | 1 | 2 | 3 | 4 | 5 | 6 | 7 | 8 | 9 | 10 | 11 | 12 | 13 | 14 | 15 | 16 | 17 | 18 | 19 | 20 | 21 | 22 | 23 | ARSC | Pts | Ref |
|---|---|---|---|---|---|---|---|---|---|---|---|---|---|---|---|---|---|---|---|---|---|---|---|---|---|---|---|---|---|
| 2005 | Jeremy Petty Racing | 65 | Chevy | DAY | NSH | SLM | KEN | TOL | LAN | MIL | POC | MCH | KAN | KEN | BLN | POC | GTW | LER | NSH | MCH | ISF | TOL | DSF; 18 | CHI | SLM | TAL | 129th | 140 | |
| 2006 | Hixson Motorsports | 2 | Pontiac | DAY | NSH | SLM | WIN | KEN | TOL | POC | MCH | KAN; 33 | KEN | BLN | POC | GTW | NSH | MCH | ISF | MIL | TOL | DSF | CHI | SLM | TAL | IOW | 163rd | 65 | |
| 2007 | Jeremy Petty Racing | 21 | Dodge | DAY | USA | NSH | SLM | KAN | WIN | KEN | TOL | IOW; 25 | POC | MCH | BLN | KEN | POC | NSH | ISF | MIL | GTW; 34 | | | | | | 114th | 190 | |
| 2007 | Corrie Stott Racing | 07 | Dodge | | | | | | | | | | | | | | | | | | | DSF; DNQ | CHI | SLM | TAL | TOL | 114th | 190 | |
| 2008 | Hixson Motorsports | 29 | Chevy | DAY | SLM | IOW; 38 | | | | | | | | | | | | | | | | | | | | | 147th | 65 | |
| 2008 | Norm Benning Racing | 8 | Chevy | | | | KAN; DNQ | CAR | KEN | TOL | POC | MCH | CAY | KEN | BLN | POC | NSH | ISF | DSF | CHI | SLM | NJE | TAL | TOL | | | 147th | 65 | |
| 2009 | Hixson Motorsports | 23 | Chevy | DAY | SLM; 13 | CAR; 26 | TAL; 22 | | TOL; 12 | POC; 17 | | MFD; 12 | IOW; 28 | | BLN; 18 | | ISF; 16 | | TOL; 24 | DSF; 14 | NJE; 19 | SLM; 12 | | CAR; 26 | | | 13th | 3635 | |
| 2009 | Hixson Motorsports | 23 | Dodge | | | | | KEN; 18 | | | MCH; 19 | | | KEN; 21 | | POC; 20 | | CHI; 26 | | | | | KAN; 30 | | | | 13th | 3635 | |
| 2012 | Wayne Peterson Racing | 06 | Ford | DAY; DNQ | MOB | SLM | TAL | TOL | ELK | POC | MCH | WIN | NJE | IOW | CHI | IRP | POC | BLN | ISF | MAD | SLM | DSF | | | | | 136th | 85 | |
| 2012 | Promotion Associates | 27 | Chevy | | | | | | | | | | | | | | | | | | | | KAN; 34 | | | | 136th | 85 | |
