= Ell–Saline USD 307 =

Public school district in Brookville, Kansas

Address
- 412 E. Anderson Rd. Brookville, Kansas, 67425; United States
- Coordinates: 38.7727°N 97.8611°W

District information
- Type: Public
- Grades: Pre-K to 12
- Superintendent: Brian Rowley
- School board: 7 members
- Schools: 2

Students and staff
- Students: 419

Other information
- Website: ellsaline.org

Ell–Saline USD 307 is a public unified school district headquartered in Brookville, Kansas, United States. The district includes the communities of Brookville, Bavaria, Hedville, Shipton, and nearby rural areas. Currently the superintendent is Brian Rowley.

== History ==
The district is governed by a seven-member board of education.

In 2018, 25.9 percent of the students tested had an effective or excellent ability to understand and use mathematics skills needed for college and career readiness. In the same year, 34.81 percent of the students tested demonstrated an effective or excellent ability in English Language Arts skills needed for college and career readiness.

== Schools ==
The school district operates the following schools:

=== Ell-Saline Jr/Sr High School ===
- Address: 414 E. Anderson St., Brookville
- Grades 7 to 12
- Principal: Chris McClure

=== Ell-Saline Elementary School ===
- Address: 1757 N. Halstead Rd. (northwest of Salina at Stimmel Rd. intersection)
- Pre-K to 6th
- Principal: Darla Raile

As of the 2022–2023 school year, the district had an enrollment of approximately 419 students, with about 226 at the elementary school and 193 at the junior/senior high school.

== Extracurricular Activities ==
The district offers various extracurricular activities to enhance student engagement, including:

- Future Business Leaders of America (FBLA)
- Future Farmers of America (FFA)
- Scholars Bowl
- Art Club
- Music and Drama Programs

== Athletics ==
Ell-Saline Jr/Sr High School offers a variety of athletic programs and has achieved success in state competitions.

- Classification: Class 2A
- League: Heart of America league
- Mascot: Cardinals
- Colors: Red and White

=== Programs ===
==== Fall Sports ====
- Football
- Volleyball
- Cross Country

==== Winter Sports ====
- Basketball
- Wrestling

==== Spring Sports ====
- Baseball
- Softball
- Track and Field

=== State Championships ===
==== Baseball ====
- 2013 – Class 2-1A State Champions.

==== Basketball ====
- 1980 – Class 1A State Champions.

==== Football ====
- 1989 – 8-Man Division I State Champions.

==== Track and Field ====
- 1978 – Individual State Champion in Long Jump (John, Brookville-Ell-Saline) with a jump of 23' 0.75".

== See also ==
- Kansas State Department of Education
- Kansas State High School Activities Association
- List of high schools in Kansas
- List of unified school districts in Kansas
