= Bennington, Kansas =

City in Ottawa County, Kansas

- City
- Location within Ottawa County and Kansas

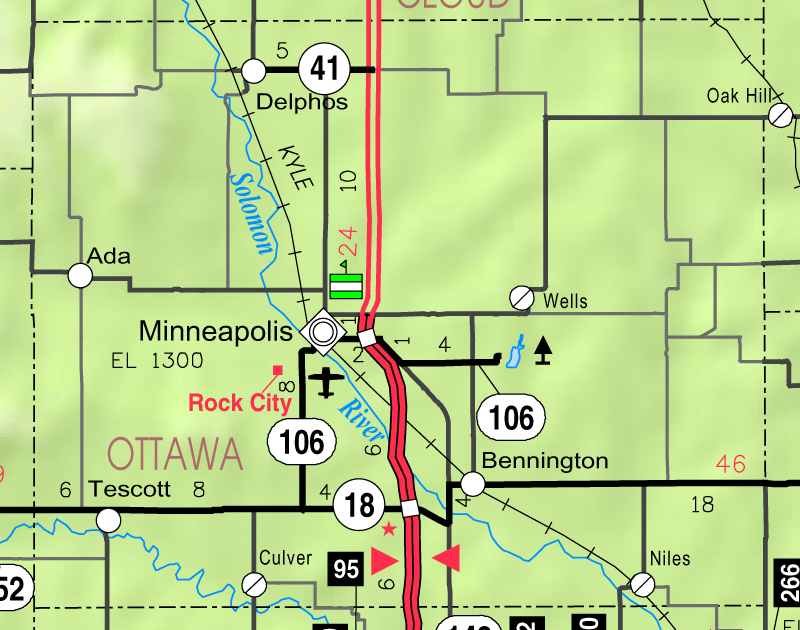
- KDOT map of Ottawa County (legend)
- Coordinates: 39°1′59″N 97°35′36″W
- Country: United States
- State: Kansas
- County: Ottawa
- Founded: 1870s
- Platted: 1878
- Incorporated: 1885
- Named for: Bennington, Vermont

Government
  - Type: Mayor–Council
  - Mayor: Ward Stockhamp

Area
  - Total: 0.42 sq mi (1.09 km^{2})
  - Land: 0.42 sq mi (1.09 km^{2})
  - Water: 0 sq mi (0.00 km^{2})
- Elevation: 1,230 ft (370 m)

Population (2020)
  - Total: 622
  - Density: 1,480/sq mi (571/km^{2})
- Time zone: UTC-6 (CST)
  - Summer (DST): UTC-5 (CDT)
- ZIP Code: 67422
- Area code: 785, exchange 488
- FIPS code: 20-06075
- GNIS ID: 2394136
- Website: cityofbennington.com

Bennington is a city in Ottawa County, Kansas, United States. As of the 2020 census, the population of the city was 622.

== History ==
=== 19th century ===
Bennington was platted in 1878 and grew to a population of over 200 within three years. The city name comes from one of two sources. A paper written on the history of Bennington states that Bennington is an Indian name meaning "place of fine trees." The same article also states that co-city founder George R. Parker gave the town its name after Bennington, Vermont. The Solomon Valley Railroad, a branch of the Kansas Pacific Railroad, reached Bennington in 1878.

In 1879, the first school was located one half mile south of town. In 1918, a new school house was built. In 1938, an auditorium was added; in 1955 a shop was added; and in 1961 a new grade school building was annexed.

== Geography ==
According to the United States Census Bureau, the city has a total area of 0.42 square miles (1.09 km^{2}), all land.

=== Climate ===
The climate in this area is characterized by hot, humid summers and generally mild to cool winters. According to the Köppen Climate Classification system, Bennington has a humid subtropical climate, abbreviated "Cfa" on climate maps.

== Demographics ==
Historical population
Census	Pop.	Note	%±
1890	390		—
1900	389		−0.3%
1910	386		−0.8%
1920	371		−3.9%
1930	374		0.8%
1940	369		−1.3%
1950	325		−11.9%
1960	535		64.6%
1970	561		4.9%
1980	579		3.2%
1990	568		−1.9%
2000	623		9.7%
2010	672		7.9%
2020	622		−7.4%
U.S. Decennial Census

Bennington is part of the Salina Micropolitan Statistical Area.

=== 2020 census ===
The 2020 United States census counted 622 people, 254 households, and 163 families in Bennington. The population density was 1,481.0 per square mile (571.8/km^{2}). There were 270 housing units at an average density of 642.9 per square mile (248.2/km^{2}). The racial makeup was 91.8% (571) white or European American (91.0% non-Hispanic white), 0.32% (2) black or African-American, 0.48% (3) Native American or Alaska Native, 0.0% (0) Asian, 0.0% (0) Pacific Islander or Native Hawaiian, 0.16% (1) from other races, and 7.23% (45) from two or more races. Hispanic or Latino of any race was 2.25% (14) of the population.

Of the 254 households, 29.9% had children under the age of 18; 49.6% were married couples living together; 24.0% had a female householder with no spouse or partner present. 28.7% of households consisted of individuals and 15.4% had someone living alone who was 65 years of age or older. The average household size was 2.2 and the average family size was 2.5. The percent of those with a bachelor's degree or higher was estimated to be 23.0% of the population.

24.8% of the population was under the age of 18, 6.6% from 18 to 24, 26.0% from 25 to 44, 25.2% from 45 to 64, and 17.4% who were 65 years of age or older. The median age was 40.1 years. For every 100 females, there were 103.3 males. For every 100 females ages 18 and older, there were 103.5 males.

The 2016–2020 5-year American Community Survey estimates show that the median household income was $67,143 (with a margin of error of +/- $13,979) and the median family income was $73,913 (+/- $5,512). Males had a median income of $40,703 (+/- $5,196) versus $23,594 (+/- $10,436) for females. The median income for those above 16 years old was $32,365 (+/- $2,567). Approximately, 13.0% of families and 16.5% of the population were below the poverty line, including 37.1% of those under the age of 18 and 0.0% of those ages 65 or over.

=== 2010 census ===
As of the census of 2010, there were 672 people, 261 households, and 188 families residing in the city. The population density was 1,600.0 inhabitants per square mile (617.8/km^{2}). There were 283 housing units at an average density of 673.8 per square mile (260.2/km^{2}). The racial makeup of the city was 97.8% White, 0.3% African American, 0.9% Native American, and 1.0% from two or more races. Hispanic or Latino of any race were 1.9% of the population.

There were 261 households, of which 37.2% had children under the age of 18 living with them, 61.7% were married couples living together, 7.7% had a female householder with no husband present, 2.7% had a male householder with no wife present, and 28.0% were non-families. 25.7% of all households were made up of individuals, and 8.8% had someone living alone who was 65 years of age or older. The average household size was 2.57 and the average family size was 3.07.

The median age in the city was 37.4 years. 28.4% of residents were under the age of 18; 6.5% were between the ages of 18 and 24; 27.3% were from 25 to 44; 25% were from 45 to 64; and 12.9% were 65 years of age or older. The gender makeup of the city was 52.8% male and 47.2% female.

== Government ==
The Bennington government consists of a mayor and five council members. The council meets the second and fourth Monday of each month at 7 pm.

- City Hall, 121 North Nelson Street.
- U.S. Post Office, 116 North Nelson Street.

== Education ==
The community is served by Twin Valley USD 240 public school district.

- Bennington High School, 301 North Putnam Street.
- Bennington Junior High School, 301 North Putnam Street.
- Bennington Grade School, 223 North Putnam Street.

== See also ==
- List of Nike missile locations
- List of tornadoes in the May 1995 tornado outbreak sequence
- List of tornadoes in the April 6–8, 2006 tornado outbreak
- List of tornadoes in the May 2007 Tornado Outbreak
- List of tornadoes in the tornado outbreak of May 26–31, 2013
