= Salina micropolitan area, Kansas =

Salina, KS Area
- Micropolitan Statistical Area
- Salina, KS Micropolitan Statistical Area
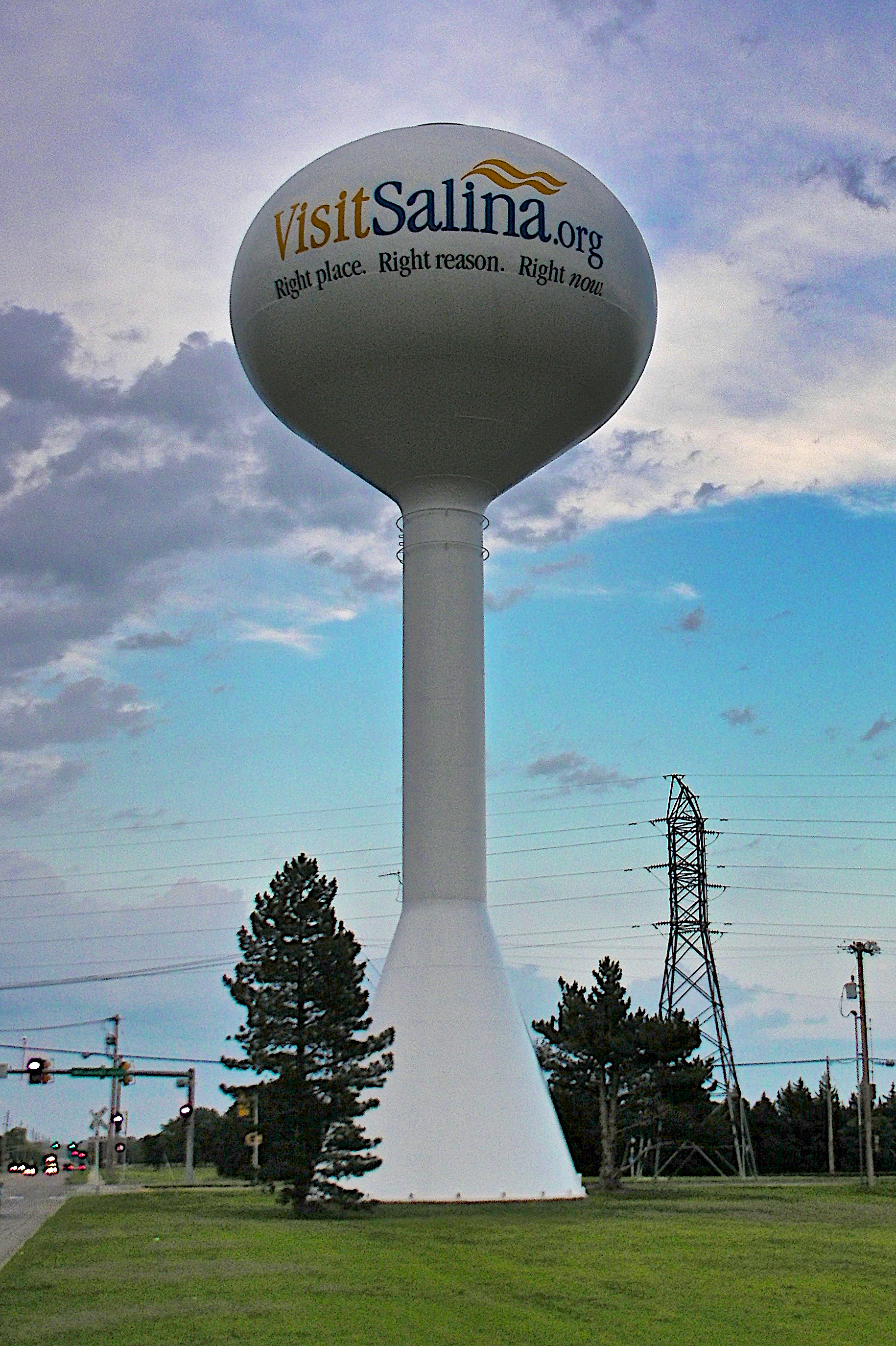
- Salina water tower (2013)
Interactive map
City of Salina
Salina, KS micropolitan statistical area
- Country: United States
- State: Kansas
- Largest city: Salina
- Time zone: UTC−6 (CST)
  - Summer (DST): UTC−5 (CDT)

The Salina, Kansas micropolitan area, as defined by the United States Census Bureau, consists of two counties in Kansas, anchored by the city of Salina.

As of the 2010 census, this micropolitan statistical area (MSA) had a population of 61,697. A July 1, 2012 estimate was 62,060.

== Counties ==
- Saline
- Ottawa

== Communities ==
- Population more than 40,000
  - Salina (principal city)
- Population 1,000 to 5,000
  - Minneapolis
  - Solomon (partial)
- Population 500 to 1,000
  - Bennington
- Population less than 500
  - Assaria
  - Brookville
  - Culver
  - Delphos
  - Gypsum
  - New Cambria
  - Smolan
  - Tescott
- Unincorporated
  - Bavaria
  - Bridgeport
  - Falun
  - Hedville
  - Kipp
  - Mentor

== Demographics ==
As of the census of 2000, the MSA had 59,760 people, 23,866 households, and 15,930 families. The racial makeup was 90.04% White, 2.83% African American, 0.51% Native American, 1.54% Asian, 0.04% Pacific Islander, 3.02% from other races, and 2.03% from two or more races. Hispanic or Latino of any race were 5.54% of the population.

The median income for a household was $37,659, and the median income for a family was $46,198. Males had a median income of $31,135 and $21,714 for females. The per capita income was $18,368.

== See also ==
- Kansas census statistical areas
