= K-106 (Kansas highway) =

State highway in Kansas, U.S.

K-106
- K-106 highlighted in red

Route information
- Maintained by KDOT and the city of Minneapolis
- Length: 16.254 mi (26.158 km)
- Existed: July 8, 1944–present

Major junctions
- West end: K-18 north-northeast of Salina
- US-81 east of Minneapolis
- East end: Lake Drive at Ottawa State Fishing Lake

Location
- Country: United States
- State: Kansas
- Counties: Ottawa

Highway system
- Kansas State Highway System; Interstate; US; State; Spurs
| ← K-105 | → K-107 |
| ← K-92 | → K-94 |

K-106 is an approximately 16 1/4-mile-long (26.2 km) state highway in the U.S. state of Kansas. It is signed as a west–east route even though the first approximately 6.5 miles (10.5 km) runs directly south to north. K-106's western terminus is at K-18 north-northwest of Salina, and the eastern terminus is a continuation as Lake Drive at Ottawa State Fishing Lake. About midway along the route, K-106 serves the city of Minneapolis and intersects U.S. Route 81 (US-81) just west of the city. South of Minneapolis, the highway passes within one mile (1.6 km) of Rock City, a group of 200 spherical boulders designated as a National Natural Landmark.

K-106 was first established on July 8, 1944, as a spur from US-81 to Minneapolis. In a resolution on May 25, 1949, a road was extended from the north side of the city to US-81 and became known as K-106N and the original K-106 became K-106S. Then by 1956, K-106S and K-106N became K-106, a complete loop through the city. On July 11, 1956, K-106 was extended southward from Minneapolis to K-18, and the loop within Minneapolis was eliminated. K-106 was extended east on June 14, 1994, over K-93 to Ottawa State Fishing Lake when a new alignment of US-81 was built.

== Route description ==
K-106's western terminus is at an intersection with K-18 north-northwest of Salina. The highway begins travelling north through small rolling hills covered with a mix of farmlands and grasslands. Roughly one mile (1.6 km) later the highway crosses Battle Creek, a tributary of the Solomon River. It advances north to an intersection with Ivy Road, which connects to Rock City, a group of 200 spherical boulders designated as a National Natural Landmarks. Here the landscape surrounding K-106 levels out and transitions to farmlands, as it continues north past an airport. As it passes by the airport it crosses Salt Creek then curves east. It continues east for 0.5 miles (0.80 km) then curves northeast and enters the city of Minneapolis. As the roadway enters the city it crosses the Solomon River then has an at-grade crossing with a Union Pacific Railroad track. K-106 then turns east at and begins to follow 1st Street. The highway then turns south at Rothsay Avenue and leaves 1st Street. It soon turns east and begins to follow Laurel Street and passes Highland Cemetery as it exits the city. K-106 continues east and crosses Lindsey Creek before reaching a diamond interchange with US-81. The highway then turns southeast and begins to parallel US-81. After just over one mile (1.6 km), K-106 turns east. It passes through flat rural farmlands before intersecting North 180th Road. The highway continues for one mile (1.6 km) then curves north and reaches its eastern terminus 0.3 miles (0.48 km) later at Ottawa State Fishing Lake, where it continues as Lake Drive.

The Kansas Department of Transportation (KDOT) tracks the traffic levels on its highways, and in 2018, they determined that on average the traffic varied from 190 vehicles per day at the eastern terminus to 1,850 vehicles per day just west of the junction with US-81. K-106 is not included in the National Highway System, (Note: The National Highway System is a system of highways important to the nation's defense, economy, and mobility.) but does connect to it at its junction with US-81. All but 1.522 miles (2.449 km) of K-106's alignment is maintained by KDOT. The entire section within Minneapolis is maintained by the city.

== History ==
Before state highways were numbered in Kansas there were auto trails, which were an informal network of marked routes that existed in the United States and Canada in the early part of the 20th century. The former Blue Line, which ran from Limon, Colorado to Junction City, follows K-106's southern terminus. In Minneaopolis, the highway crosses a spur of the former Sunflower Trail, which ran from Salina north to Beloit, and the former Meridian Highway, which ran from Laredo, Texas north to Pembina, North Dakota. In Minneapolis, US-81 originally followed East 10th Street then turned north onto North 120th Road.

K-106 was assigned by KDOT, at the time State Highway Commission of Kansas (SHC), on July 8, 1944, when US-81 was moved slightly east to a new alignment. At that time it began at the Minneapolis city limits and ran east along Laurel Street to US-81. In a May 25, 1949 resolution, a road was extended from the north side of the city east along 10th Street to US-81 and became known as K-106N and the original K-106 became K-106S. Between 1953 and 1956, K-106S and K-106N became K-106, a complete loop through the city. On July 11, 1956, the SHC passed a resolution to extend K-106 southward 7.554 miles (12.157 km) to K-18, and the section along Laurel Street formally known as K-106N was eliminated. The bridge over the Solomon River, just south of Minneapolis, was closed for three weeks between September and October 1962. The original brick, concrete and blacktop deck was ripped up and replaced with a concrete deck.

K-93
- Location: US-81–Ottawa State Fishing Lake
- Existed: May 1, 1936–June 14, 1994

In June 1990, Secretary of Transportation Horace Edwards announced that between 1991 and 1995, that US-81 would be expanded to four lanes from Minneapolis north to Concordia. This project included building an interchange at the junction with K-106. On May 19, 1995, a groundbreaking ceremony for the section of US-81 from Minneapolis north 14 miles (23 km) was held at the junction with K-106. This section of US-81 was completed in 1997. The portion of K-106 from Heartland Drive east to Ottawa Lake was designated as K-93 on May 1, 1936. By June 1994, the realignment of US-81 was nearing completion. In a resolution on June 14, 1994, K-106 was extended south along the former US-81 then east along K-93, at which time the K-93 designation was removed.

== Major intersections ==
The entire route is in Ottawa County.

| Location | mi | km | Destinations | Notes |
|---|---|---|---|---|
| Culver Township | 0.000 | 0.000 | K-18 – Junction City, Lincoln | Western terminus |
| Concord Township | 10.420 | 16.769 | US-81 – Concordia, Salina | Diamond interchange |
| Ottawa State Fishing Lake | 16.254 | 26.158 | Lake Drive | Eastern terminus |
1.000 mi = 1.609 km; 1.000 km = 0.621 mi
