= Twin Valley USD 240 =

Public school district in Bennington, Kansas

Address
- 107 N. Nelson St. Bennington, Kansas, 67422; United States
- Coordinates: 39.0309°N 97.5939°W

District information
- Type: Public
- Grades: Pre-K to 12
- Schools: 4

Other information
- Website: usd240.org

Twin Valley USD 240 is a public unified school district headquartered in Bennington, Kansas, United States. The district includes the communities of Bennington, Culver, Tescott, Glendale, and nearby rural areas.

== Schools ==
The school district operates the following schools:

- Bennington Junior/Senior High School
- Bennington Grade School
- Tescott Junior/Senior High School
- Tescott Grade School

== See also ==
- Kansas State Department of Education
- Kansas State High School Activities Association
- List of high schools in Kansas
- List of unified school districts in Kansas
