= Falun (symbol) =

Emblem of Falun Gong

The Falun

The Falun (法輪) symbol pictured is used as an emblem by the Falun Gong spiritual group. The term translates literally as "law wheel." Other representations of the Falun (dharma wheel, or Dharmachakra in Sanskrit) are utilized in other Buddhist traditions. In Buddhism, the Dharmachakra represents the completeness of the doctrine. To "turn the wheel of dharma" (Zhuan Falun) means to preach the Buddhist doctrine, and is the title of Falun Gong's main text.

Despite the invocation of Buddhist language and symbols, the law wheel as understood in Falun Gong has distinct connotations, and is held to represent the universe. It is conceptualized by an emblem consisting of one large and four small swastika symbols, representing the Buddha, and four small Taiji (yin-yang) symbols of the Daoist tradition.

It is blazoned as:

Orange, a chakram Gules fimbriated, charged with a svastika Or of the first. In the first and fourth quarters, a Taiji Sable and Gules; in the second and third quarters, a Taiji Azure and Gules, between four Taijis, four svastikas Or.
