= Walnut Township, Saline County, Kansas =

Township in Saline County, Kansas, U.S.

Walnut Township
- Township
- Location within Saline County
- Coordinates: 38.734181°N 97.530554°W
- Country: United States
- State: Kansas
- County: Saline

Government
  - District 3 County Commissioner: Rodger Sparks (R)

Area
  - Total: 35.864 sq mi (92.89 km^{2})
  - Land: 35.598 sq mi (92.20 km^{2})
  - Water: 0.266 sq mi (0.69 km^{2}) 0.74%

Population (2020)
  - Total: 481
  - Density: 13.5/sq mi (5.22/km^{2})
- Time zone: UTC-6 (CST)
  - Summer (DST): UTC-5 (CDT)
- Area code: 785
- GNIS feature ID: 476831

Walnut Township is a township in Saline County, Kansas, United States. As of the 2020 census, its population was 481.

== History ==
Spring Creek Township had four other townships created from parts of it: Falun Township in 1871, Liberty Township in 1872, Smolan Township in 1874, and Smoky View Township in 1876.

== Geography ==
Walnut Township covers an area of 35.864 square miles (92.89 square kilometers). The Smoky Hill River flows through it.

=== Communities ===
- part of Mentor

=== Adjacent townships ===
Greeley Township, Saline County
		north	northeast	Solomon Township, Saline County
Smolan Township, Saline County	west	self	east	Eureka Township, Saline County
Smoky View Township, Saline County	southwest	south
Liberty Township, Saline County

== Transportation ==
=== Major highways ===
- K-4
