= Culver, Kansas =

City in Ottawa County, Kansas

- City
- Location within Ottawa County and Kansas

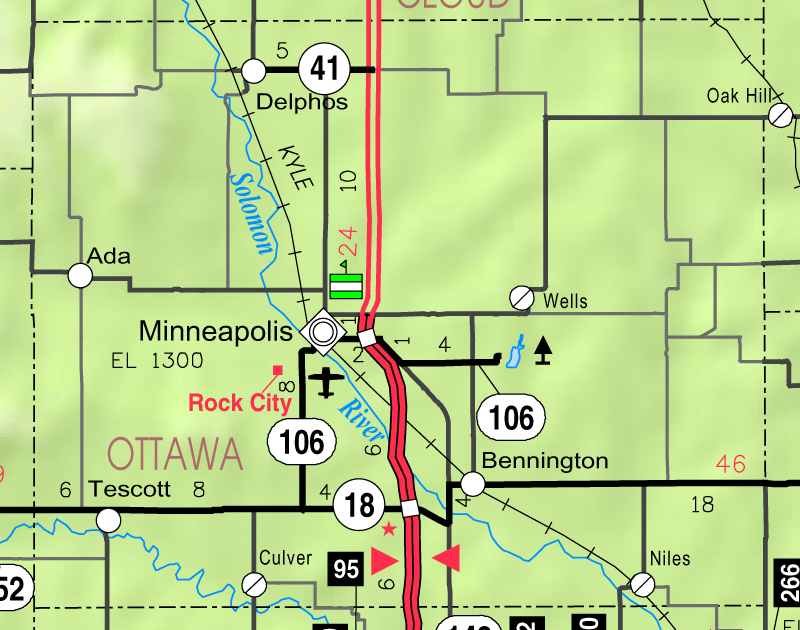
- KDOT map of Ottawa County (legend)
- Coordinates: 38°58′13″N 97°45′33″W
- Country: United States
- State: Kansas
- County: Ottawa
- Founded: 1870s
- Platted: 1878
- Incorporated: 1909
- Named for: George Washington Culver

Area
  - Total: 0.14 sq mi (0.35 km^{2})
  - Land: 0.14 sq mi (0.35 km^{2})
  - Water: 0 sq mi (0.00 km^{2})
- Elevation: 1,260 ft (380 m)

Population (2020)
  - Total: 114
  - Density: 840/sq mi (330/km^{2})
- Time zone: UTC-6 (CST)
  - Summer (DST): UTC-5 (CDT)
- ZIP Code: 67484
- Area code: 785
- FIPS code: 20-16700
- GNIS ID: 2393693
- Website: cityofculverkansas.org

Culver is a city in Ottawa County, Kansas, United States. As of the 2020 census, the population of the city was 114. It is located northwest of Salina at the intersection of 90th Road and Aspen Road, next to an abandoned railroad.

== History ==
Culver was laid out circa 1878. It was named after George Washington Culver, who was living in Ottawa County in August 1868 when he was recruited to be a scout for Col. George Forsyth, following the first Spillman-Bacon Creek Indian raid. At daybreak on September 17, 1868, Forsyth's band of 50 civilian scouts was attacked by approximately 1,000 of Roman Nose's dog soldier warriors in northeastern Colorado Territory. This was known as Beecher Island. They took cover on a small sandy island in the middle of the Arickaree fork of the Republican River, about 17 miles south of present-day Wray, Colorado. The next three days were spent fighting and by the time the fighting ended, the scouts were out of rations and living on horse and mule meat. About half of the scouts were wounded at the outbreak of the fighting. Culver was one of five scouts killed or mortally wounded. Culver was buried at the battleground, later moved to Fort Wallace Cemetery and eventually to Fort Leavenworth National Cemetery. Before Beecher Island, during the Civil War he served as 2nd Lt, Co E, Second Colorado Cavalry. Following the Civil War, he worked for a time as a watchmaker in Junction City, Kansas, and shortly before his death was elected to public office in Ottawa County. The town and township of Culver were named in honor of him.

A post office was opened at Culver in 1873 and remained in operation until it was discontinued in 1984.

== Geography ==
According to the United States Census Bureau, the city has a total area of 0.15 square miles (0.39 km^{2}), all land.

== Demographics ==
Historical population
Census	Pop.	Note	%±
1910	326		—
1920	234		−28.2%
1930	206		−12.0%
1940	195		−5.3%
1950	153		−21.5%
1960	200		30.7%
1970	148		−26.0%
1980	167		12.8%
1990	162		−3.0%
2000	164		1.2%
2010	121		−26.2%
2020	114		−5.8%
U.S. Decennial Census

Culver is part of the Salina Micropolitan Statistical Area.

=== 2020 census ===
The 2020 United States census counted 114 people, 41 households, and 25 families in Culver. The population density was 640.4 per square mile (247.3/km^{2}). There were 56 housing units at an average density of 314.6 per square mile (121.5/km^{2}). The racial makeup was 85.09% (97) white or European American (84.21% non-Hispanic white), 0.0% (0) black or African-American, 2.63% (3) Native American or Alaska Native, 0.88% (1) Asian, 0.0% (0) Pacific Islander or Native Hawaiian, 0.88% (1) from other races, and 10.53% (12) from two or more races. Hispanic or Latino of any race was 5.26% (6) of the population.

Of the 41 households, 17.1% had children under the age of 18; 48.8% were married couples living together; 26.8% had a female householder with no spouse or partner present. 39.0% of households consisted of individuals and 17.1% had someone living alone who was 65 years of age or older. The average household size was 2.3 and the average family size was 2.9. The percent of those with a bachelor's degree or higher was estimated to be 8.8% of the population.

21.1% of the population was under the age of 18, 3.5% from 18 to 24, 21.1% from 25 to 44, 24.6% from 45 to 64, and 29.8% who were 65 years of age or older. The median age was 54.0 years. For every 100 females, there were 111.1 males. For every 100 females ages 18 and older, there were 119.5 males.

The 2016–2020 5-year American Community Survey estimates show that the median household income was $27,813 (with a margin of error of +/- $11,696) and the median family income was $29,375 (+/- $25,601). Approximately, 21.4% of families and 32.6% of the population were below the poverty line, including 44.0% of those under the age of 18 and 25.0% of those ages 65 or over.

=== 2010 census ===
As of the census of 2010, there were 121 people, 48 households, and 34 families residing in the city. The population density was 806.7 inhabitants per square mile (311.5/km^{2}). There were 56 housing units at an average density of 373.3 per square mile (144.1/km^{2}). The racial makeup of the city was 92.6% White, 4.1% African American, 0.8% Native American, 0.8% Asian, 0.8% from other races, and 0.8% from two or more races. Hispanic or Latino of any race were 3.3% of the population.

There were 48 households, of which 22.9% had children under the age of 18 living with them, 56.3% were married couples living together, 10.4% had a female householder with no husband present, 4.2% had a male householder with no wife present, and 29.2% were non-families. 25.0% of all households were made up of individuals, and 8.4% had someone living alone who was 65 years of age or older. The average household size was 2.52 and the average family size was 2.91.

The median age in the city was 47.3 years. 17.4% of residents were under the age of 18; 11.5% were between the ages of 18 and 24; 18.2% were from 25 to 44; 37.1% were from 45 to 64; and 15.7% were 65 years of age or older. The gender makeup of the city was 52.9% male and 47.1% female.

== Education ==
The community is served by Twin Valley USD 240 public school district.

== Notable people ==
- George Washington Carver, lived in the vicinity for a brief period.
