= Falun Township, Kansas =

Township in Saline County, Kansas, U.S.

Falun Township
- Township
- Location within Saline County
- Coordinates: 38.6608°N 97.8061°W
- Country: United States
- State: Kansas
- County: Saline
- Established: 1871

Government
  - District 4 County Commissioner: James Weese (R)

Area
  - Total: 72.011 sq mi (186.51 km^{2})
  - Land: 71.948 sq mi (186.34 km^{2})
  - Water: 0.063 sq mi (0.16 km^{2}) 0.09%

Population (2020)
  - Total: 267
  - Density: 3.71/sq mi (1.43/km^{2})
- Time zone: UTC-6 (CST)
  - Summer (DST): UTC-5 (CDT)
- Area code: 785
- GNIS feature ID: 476943

Falun Township is a township in Saline County, Kansas, United States. As of the 2020 census, its population was 267.

== History ==
Falun Township was organized in 1871 from Walnut Township. Summit Township was separated from it in 1880. Summit Township was reabsorbed into Falun Township in the 1960s. This gave it the name Falun-Summit Township before the name Falun Township was restored.

== Geography ==
Falun Township covers an area of 72.011 square miles (186.51 square kilometers).

=== Communities ===
- Falun

=== Adjacent townships ===
Washington Township, Saline County
Spring Creek Township, Saline County	northwest	north	northeast	Smolan Township, Saline County
Empire Township, Ellsworth County	west	self	east	Smoky View Township, Saline County
Langley Township, Ellsworth County	southwest	south	southeast	Smoky Hill Township, McPherson County
Union Township, McPherson County; Marquette Township, McPherson County
