= Lincoln Township, Dickinson County, Kansas =

Lincoln Township
- Township
- Location in Dickinson County
- Coordinates: 38°54′55″N 097°19′01″W
- Country: United States
- State: Kansas
- County: Dickinson

Area
  - Total: 36.66 sq mi (94.96 km^{2})
  - Land: 35.93 sq mi (93.07 km^{2})
  - Water: 0.73 sq mi (1.89 km^{2}) 1.99%
- Elevation: 1,211 ft (369 m)

Population (2020)
  - Total: 1,535
  - Density: 42.72/sq mi (16.49/km^{2})
- GNIS feature ID: 0476656

Lincoln Township is a township in Dickinson County, Kansas, United States. As of the 2020 census, its population was 1,535.

== History ==
Lincoln Township was organized in 1872.

== Geography ==
Lincoln Township covers an area of 36.66 square miles (94.9 km^{2}) and contains one incorporated settlement, Solomon. According to the USGS, it contains one cemetery, Prairie Mound.

The stream of Solomon River runs through this township.
