= Brookville, Kansas =

City in Saline County, Kansas

- City
- The formerly NRHP-listed Brookville Hotel building (c. 1870) in 2026. Its listing was removed in 2013 after it was remodeled into a Mission Revival style.

- Location within Saline County and Kansas

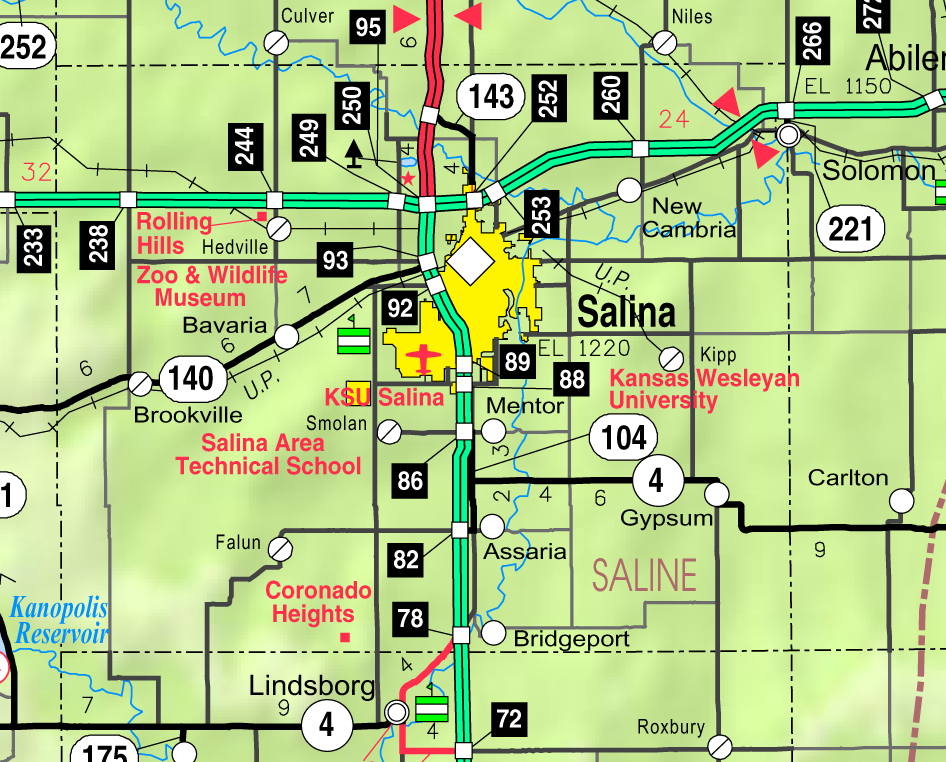
- KDOT map of Saline County (legend)
- Coordinates: 38°46′24″N 97°52′5″W
- Country: United States
- State: Kansas
- County: Saline
- Founded: 1870
- Platted: 1870
- Incorporated: 1871

Area
  - Total: 0.58 sq mi (1.49 km^{2})
  - Land: 0.58 sq mi (1.49 km^{2})
  - Water: 0 sq mi (0.00 km^{2})
- Elevation: 1,362 ft (415 m)

Population (2020)
  - Total: 247
  - Density: 429/sq mi (166/km^{2})
- Time zone: UTC-6 (CST)
  - Summer (DST): UTC-5 (CDT)
- ZIP Code: 67425
- Area code: 785
- FIPS code: 20-08575
- GNIS ID: 476780

Brookville is a city in Saline County, Kansas, United States. As of the 2020 census, the population of the city was 247.

== History ==
Brookville was laid out in 1870 when the Kansas Pacific Railway was extended to that point. The first post office in Brookville was established in February 1870.

== Geography ==
Brookville is located at 38°46′24″N 97°52′5″W (38.773464, -97.868015). According to the United States Census Bureau, the city has a total area of 0.57 square miles (1.48 km^{2}), all land.

=== Climate ===
The climate in this area is characterized by hot, humid summers and generally mild to cool winters. According to the Köppen Climate Classification system, Brookville has a humid subtropical climate, abbreviated "Cfa" on climate maps.

== Demographics ==
Historical population
Census	Pop.	Note	%±
1870	201		—
1880	511		154.2%
1890	345		−32.5%
1900	292		−15.4%
1910	280		−4.1%
1920	212		−24.3%
1930	237		11.8%
1940	221		−6.8%
1950	213		−3.6%
1960	246		15.5%
1970	238		−3.3%
1980	259		8.8%
1990	226		−12.7%
2000	259		14.6%
2010	262		1.2%
2020	247		−5.7%
U.S. Decennial Census

It is part of the Salina Micropolitan Statistical Area.

=== 2020 census ===
The 2020 United States census counted 247 people, 92 households, and 62 families in Brookville. The population density was 429.6 per square mile (165.9/km^{2}). There were 109 housing units at an average density of 189.6 per square mile (73.2/km^{2}). The racial makeup was 92.31% (228) white or European American (92.31% non-Hispanic white), 0.0% (0) black or African-American, 1.62% (4) Native American or Alaska Native, 0.4% (1) Asian, 0.0% (0) Pacific Islander or Native Hawaiian, 0.81% (2) from other races, and 4.86% (12) from two or more races. Hispanic or Latino of any race was 3.24% (8) of the population.

Of the 92 households, 30.4% had children under the age of 18; 53.3% were married couples living together; 17.4% had a female householder with no spouse or partner present. 25.0% of households consisted of individuals and 9.8% had someone living alone who was 65 years of age or older. The average household size was 2.9 and the average family size was 3.6. The percent of those with a bachelor's degree or higher was estimated to be 6.1% of the population.

26.3% of the population was under the age of 18, 8.5% from 18 to 24, 25.9% from 25 to 44, 27.1% from 45 to 64, and 12.1% who were 65 years of age or older. The median age was 35.9 years. For every 100 females, there were 94.5 males. For every 100 females ages 18 and older, there were 95.7 males.

The 2016–2020 5-year American Community Survey estimates show that the median household income was $59,063 (with a margin of error of +/- $23,818) and the median family income was $72,857 (+/- $54,209). Males had a median income of $40,250 (+/- $15,062) versus $29,063 (+/- $7,565) for females. The median income for those above 16 years old was $35,987 (+/- $8,316). Approximately, 3.7% of families and 10.4% of the population were below the poverty line, including 7.4% of those under the age of 18 and 8.0% of those ages 65 or over.

=== 2010 census ===
As of the 2010 census, there were 262 people, 101 households, and 72 families residing in the city. The population density was 459.6 inhabitants per square mile (177.5/km^{2}). There were 113 housing units at an average density of 198.2 per square mile (76.5/km^{2}). The racial makeup of the city was 94.3% White, 0.4% Native American, 0.4% Pacific Islander, 1.5% from other races, and 3.4% from two or more races. Hispanic or Latino of any race were 5.0% of the population.

There were 101 households, of which 38.6% had children under the age of 18 living with them, 54.5% were married couples living together, 8.9% had a female householder with no husband present, 7.9% had a male householder with no wife present, and 28.7% were non-families. 23.8% of all households were made up of individuals, and 7% had someone living alone who was 65 years of age or older. The average household size was 2.59 and the average family size was 2.97.

The median age in the city was 39 years. 27.9% of residents were under the age of 18; 7.5% were between the ages of 18 and 24; 25.2% were from 25 to 44; 28.7% were from 45 to 64; and 10.7% were 65 years of age or older. The gender makeup of the city was 54.6% male and 45.4% female.

== Education ==
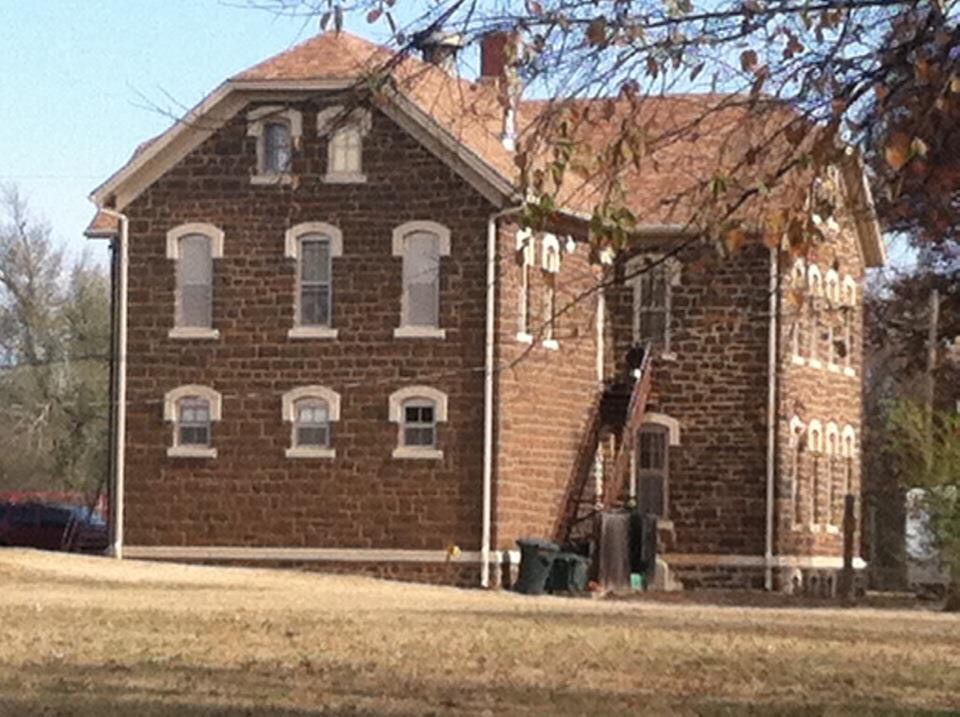
Former Brookville grade school (2012)

The community is served by Ell-Saline USD 307 public school district. Ell-Saline schools are located in Brookville. The Ell-Saline school mascot is Cardinals.

Prior to school unification as Ell-Saline High School, the Brookville High School mascot was Brookville Cardinals. The Brookville Cardinals won the Kansas State High School boys class BB basketball championship in 1952.

== In popular culture ==
One scene of the 1980 film Up the Academy was filmed in Brookville, where the boys drive off without paying for fuel.

== See also ==
- National Register of Historic Places listings in Saline County, Kansas
