= Wheatland Township, Dickinson County, Kansas =

Wheatland Township
- Township
- Location in Dickinson County
- Coordinates: 38°44′25″N 097°19′01″W
- Country: United States
- State: Kansas
- County: Dickinson

Area
  - Total: 36.07 sq mi (93.43 km^{2})
  - Land: 36.01 sq mi (93.26 km^{2})
  - Water: 0.066 sq mi (0.17 km^{2}) 0.18%
- Elevation: 1,240 ft (378 m)

Population (2020)
  - Total: 129
  - Density: 3.58/sq mi (1.38/km^{2})
- GNIS feature ID: 0476841

Wheatland Township is a township in Dickinson County, Kansas, United States. As of the 2020 census, its population was 129.

== History ==
Wheatland Township was organized in 1878.

== Geography ==
Wheatland Township covers an area of 36.07 square miles (93.4 km^{2}) and contains no incorporated settlements. According to the USGS, it contains one cemetery, Fairview.

The streams of East Holland Creek and West Holland Creek run through this township.
