= Smolan, Kansas =

City in Saline County, Kansas

- City
- Location within Saline County and Kansas

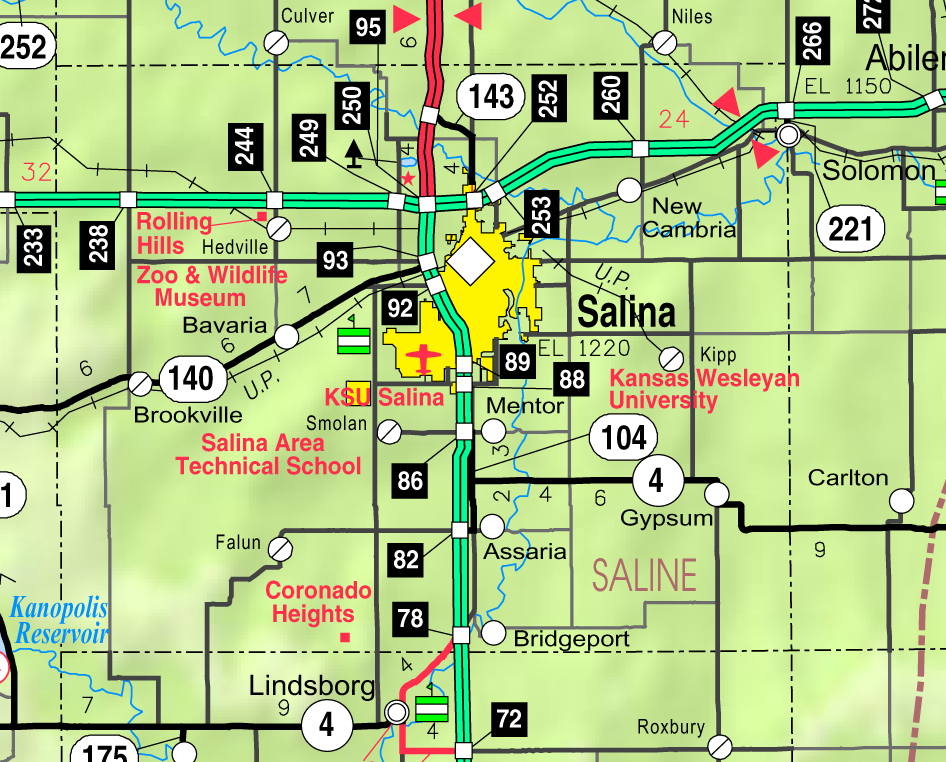
- KDOT map of Saline County (legend)
- Coordinates: 38°44′17″N 97°41′2″W
- Country: United States
- State: Kansas
- County: Saline
- Founded: 1800s
- Incorporated: 1962
- Named for: Småland

Area
  - Total: 0.11 sq mi (0.29 km^{2})
  - Land: 0.11 sq mi (0.29 km^{2})
  - Water: 0 sq mi (0.00 km^{2})
- Elevation: 1,283 ft (391 m)

Population (2020)
  - Total: 162
  - Density: 1,400/sq mi (560/km^{2})
- Time zone: UTC-6 (CST)
  - Summer (DST): UTC-5 (CDT)
- ZIP Code: 67479
- Area code: 785
- FIPS code: 20-66100
- GNIS ID: 476947

Smolan is a city in Saline County, Kansas, United States. As of the 2020 census, the population of the city was 162.

== History ==
Smolan was named after the Swedish province of Småland, the native home of a large share of the early settlers.

A post office was opened in Smolan in 1887, and remained in operation until it was discontinued in 1997.

== Geography ==
Smolan is located at 38°44′17″N 97°41′2″W (38.738009, -97.683940). According to the United States Census Bureau, the city has a total area of 0.13 square miles (0.34 km^{2}), all land.

== Demographics ==
Historical population
Census	Pop.	Note	%±
1970	175		—
1980	169		−3.4%
1990	195		15.4%
2000	218		11.8%
2010	215		−1.4%
2020	162		−24.7%
U.S. Decennial Census

It is part of the Salina Micropolitan Statistical Area.

=== 2010 census ===
As of the census of 2010, there were 215 people, 80 households, and 59 families residing in the city. The population density was 1,653.8 inhabitants per square mile (638.5/km^{2}). There were 94 housing units at an average density of 723.1 per square mile (279.2/km^{2}). The racial makeup of the city was 91.2% White, 3.7% Asian, 2.8% from other races, and 2.3% from two or more races. Hispanic or Latino of any race were 4.7% of the population.

There were 80 households, of which 36.3% had children under the age of 18 living with them, 62.5% were married couples living together, 6.3% had a female householder with no husband present, 5.0% had a male householder with no wife present, and 26.3% were non-families. 23.8% of all households were made up of individuals, and 2.5% had someone living alone who was 65 years of age or older. The average household size was 2.69 and the average family size was 3.12.

The median age in the city was 39.8 years. 27.4% of residents were under the age of 18; 8.4% were between the ages of 18 and 24; 18.7% were from 25 to 44; 36.7% were from 45 to 64; and 8.8% were 65 years of age or older. The gender makeup of the city was 53.5% male and 46.5% female.

=== 2000 census ===
As of the census of 2000, there were 218 people, 79 households, and 63 families residing in the city. The population density was 1,575.5 inhabitants per square mile (608.3/km^{2}). There were 83 housing units at an average density of 599.9 per square mile (231.6/km^{2}). The racial makeup of the city was 97.71% White, 0.46% African American, 0.46% Native American, 1.38% from other races. Hispanic or Latino of any race were 5.50% of the population.

There were 79 households, out of which 41.8% had children under the age of 18 living with them, 68.4% were married couples living together, 6.3% had a female householder with no husband present, and 19.0% were non-families. 16.5% of all households were made up of individuals, and 2.5% had someone living alone who was 65 years of age or older. The average household size was 2.76 and the average family size was 3.06.

In the city, the population was spread out, with 31.2% under the age of 18, 5.0% from 18 to 24, 32.1% from 25 to 44, 22.5% from 45 to 64, and 9.2% who were 65 years of age or older. The median age was 37 years. For every 100 females, there were 101.9 males. For every 100 females age 18 and over, there were 108.3 males.

The median income for a household in the city was $40,500, and the median income for a family was $43,750. Males had a median income of $26,750 versus $23,750 for females. The per capita income for the city was $16,149. About 10.3% of families and 10.0% of the population were below the poverty line, including 12.5% of those under the age of eighteen and none of those 65 or over.

== Education ==
The community is served by Smoky Valley USD 400 public school district. The Smoky Valley High School mascot is Smoky Valley Vikings.

Smolan High School was closed through school unification. The Smolan High School mascot was Smolan Swedes.

== Notable people ==
- John W. Carlin, former governor of Kansas (January 1979 – January 1987)
- Jeremy Petty, racing driver
