= K-143 (Kansas highway) =

State highway in Kansas, U.S.

K-143
- K-143 highlighted in red

Route information
- Maintained by KDOT
- Length: 4.658 mi (7.496 km)

Major junctions
- South end: I-70 / US-40 in Salina
- North end: US-81 north of Salina

Location
- Country: United States
- State: Kansas
- Counties: Saline

Highway system
- Kansas State Highway System; Interstate; US; State; Spurs
← K-141	→ K-144

K-143 is a 4.658-mile-long (7.496 km) north–south state highway in Saline County, Kansas. The route runs through lands mostly used for agriculture from an interchange at Interstate 70 (I-70) and U.S. Route 40 (US-40) in northern Salina, Kansas generally northward to a junction with US-81 north of Salina. The southern part of the route is a four-lane divided highway while the rest is a two-lane highway. It has an annual average daily traffic (AADT) between 1,580 and 4,133 vehicles. The route is paved with three different pavement types, and is not a part of the National Highway System. It was first designated as US-81 Alternate in the early 1970s with the designation being changed to K-143 in the early 1980s.

== Route description ==
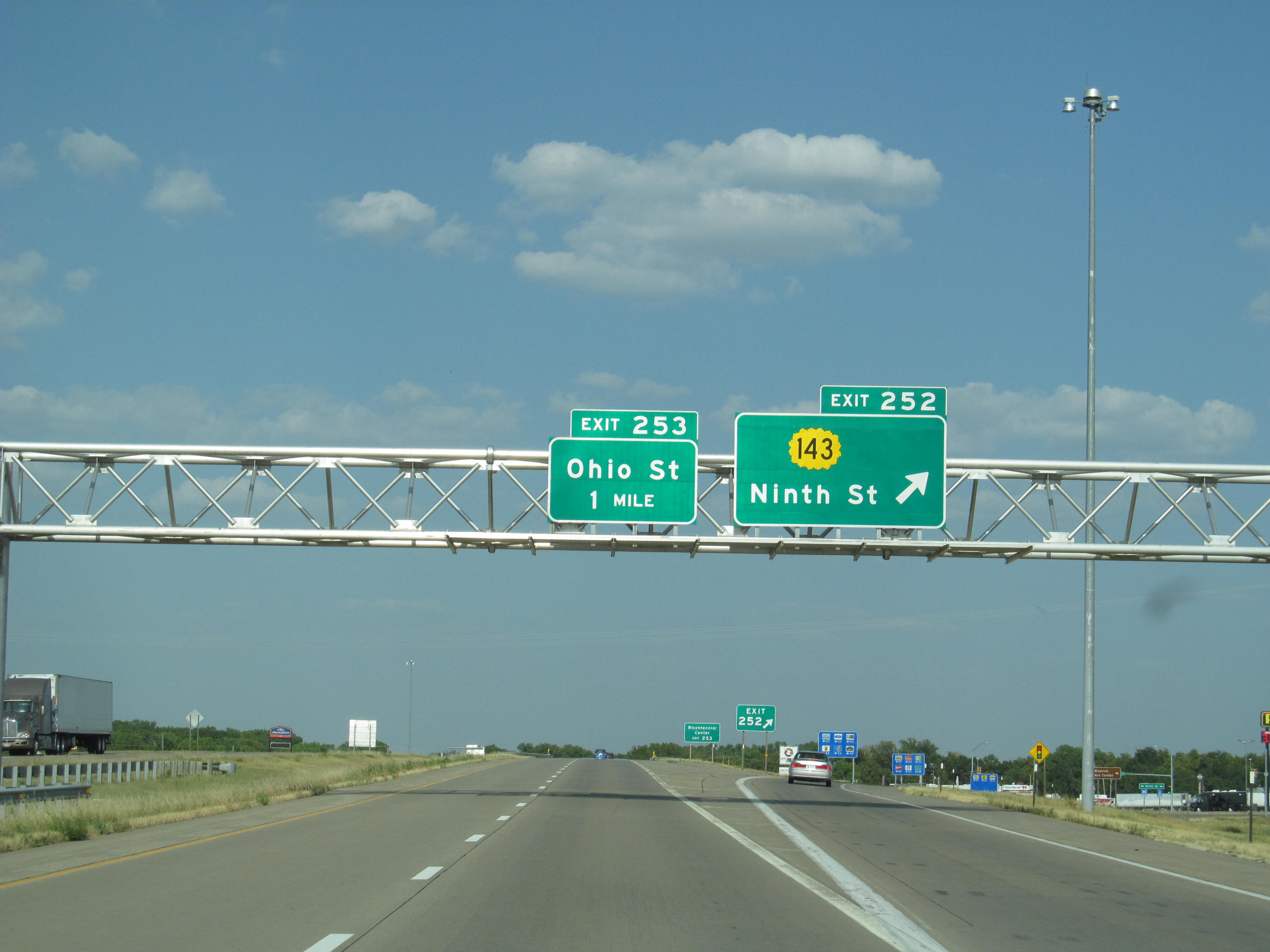
I-70 at exit for K-143

K-143's southern terminus is at a diamond interchange with I-70 in the northernmost parts of Salina, Kansas. For the first 0.9 miles (1.4 km) of the route, the highway travels due north through commercial and agricultural land within the Salina city limits. A short distance after this, K-143 transitions from a divided four-lane highway into a two-lane highway. It then crosses the Saline River and continues north through primarily agricultural land north of Salina. At 2.7 miles (4.3 km), K-143 turns northwest and follows a gently curving path in that direction for the remainder of the route. The highway then reaches its northern terminus at US-81.

K-143 has an AADT of 4,133 vehicles in the southernmost 0.9 miles (1.4 km) of the route, with an AADT of 1,580–1,595 vehicles in the remainder of the route. The route is paved with a combination of full-design bituminous pavement, composite pavement, and partial-design bituminous pavement. K-143 is not a part of the National Highway System.

== History ==
K-143's route was established between 1970 and 1971 as US-81 Alternate. The numbering was changed to K-143 between 1981 and 1983.

== Major intersections ==
The entire route is in Saline County.

Location	mi	km	Destinations	Notes
Salina	0.000	0.000	I-70 / US-40	Southern terminus; I-70 exit 252; diamond interchange
	4.658	7.496	US-81	Northern terminus; diamond interchange
1.000 mi = 1.609 km; 1.000 km = 0.621 mi
