= Garfield Township, Dickinson County, Kansas =

Garfield Township
- Township
- Location in Dickinson County
- Coordinates: 38°49′40″N 097°19′01″W
- Country: United States
- State: Kansas
- County: Dickinson

Area
  - Total: 36.3 sq mi (94.1 km^{2})
  - Land: 36.31 sq mi (94.04 km^{2})
  - Water: 0.023 sq mi (0.06 km^{2}) 0.06%
- Elevation: 1,253 ft (382 m)

Population (2020)
  - Total: 187
  - Density: 5.15/sq mi (1.99/km^{2})
- GNIS feature ID: 0476840

Garfield Township is a township in Dickinson County, Kansas, United States. As of the 2020 census, its population was 187.

== Geography ==
Garfield Township covers an area of 36.33 square miles (94.1 km^{2}) and contains no incorporated settlements. According to the USGS, it contains one cemetery, Green Lawn.
