= Kipp, Kansas =

Unincorporated community in Saline County, Kansas

- Unincorporated community and CDP
- Location within Saline County and Kansas

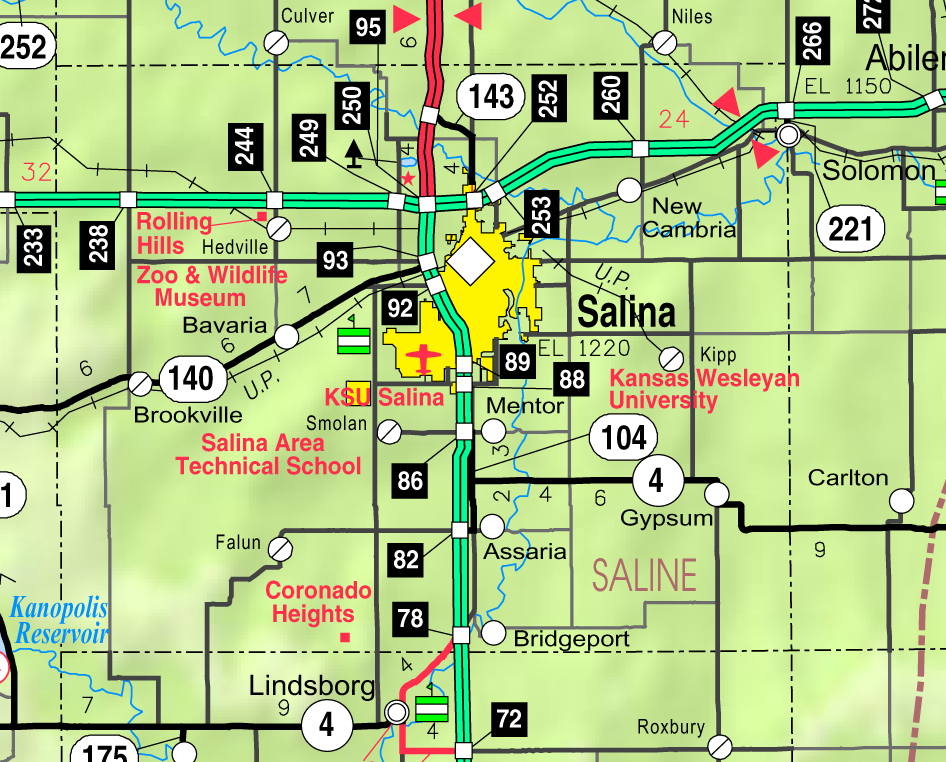
- KDOT map of Saline County (legend)
- Coordinates: 38°47′02″N 97°27′16″W
- Country: United States
- State: Kansas
- County: Saline
- Township: Eureka, Solomon
- Elevation: 1,207 ft (368 m)

Population (2020)
  - Total: 60
- Time zone: UTC-6 (CST)
  - Summer (DST): UTC-5 (CDT)
- ZIP Code: 67401
- Area code: 785
- FIPS code: 20-37200
- GNIS ID: 476837

Kipp is an unincorporated community and census-designated place (CDP) in Saline County, Kansas, United States. As of the 2020 census, the population was 60. It is located southeast of Salina, along Schilling Road between Whitmore Road and Kipp Road, next to an abandoned railroad.

== History ==
A post office was opened in Kipp in 1890, and remained in operation until it was discontinued in 1957.

== Geography ==
Its elevation is 1207 feet (368 m), and it is located at 38°47′2″N 97°27′16″W (38.7838911, -97.4544748). The West Branch of Gypsum Creek flows through the community.

== Demographics ==
Historical population
Census	Pop.	Note	%±
2020	60		—
U.S. Decennial Census

Kipp is a part of the Salina micropolitan area.

The 2020 United States census counted 60 people, 29 households, and 26 families in Kipp. The population density was 74.4 per square mile (28.7/km^{2}). There were 31 housing units at an average density of 38.5 per square mile (14.9/km^{2}). The racial makeup was 90.0% (54) white or European American (86.67% non-Hispanic white), 0.0% (0) black or African-American, 0.0% (0) Native American or Alaska Native, 0.0% (0) Asian, 0.0% (0) Pacific Islander or Native Hawaiian, 0.0% (0) from other races, and 10.0% (6) from two or more races. Hispanic or Latino of any race was 6.67% (4) of the population.

Of the 29 households, 31.0% had children under the age of 18; 82.8% were married couples living together; 13.8% had a female householder with no spouse or partner present. 10.3% of households consisted of individuals and 6.9% had someone living alone who was 65 years of age or older. The percent of those with a bachelor's degree or higher was estimated to be 0.0% of the population.

25.0% of the population was under the age of 18, 3.3% from 18 to 24, 18.3% from 25 to 44, 28.3% from 45 to 64, and 25.0% who were 65 years of age or older. The median age was 50.3 years. For every 100 females, there were 172.7 males. For every 100 females ages 18 and older, there were 181.2 males.

== Economy ==
A Great Plains Manufacturing Land Pride manufacturing facility is located in Kipp.

== Education ==
The community is served by Southeast of Saline USD 306 public school district. The district high school, Southeast of Saline, is located 4 miles west of Gypsum.

Kipp schools were closed through school unification. The Kipp High School mascot was Kipp Orioles. The Kipp Orioles won the Kansas State High School class B baseball championship in 1949.
