= CityGo =

Bus service in Salina, Kansas, US

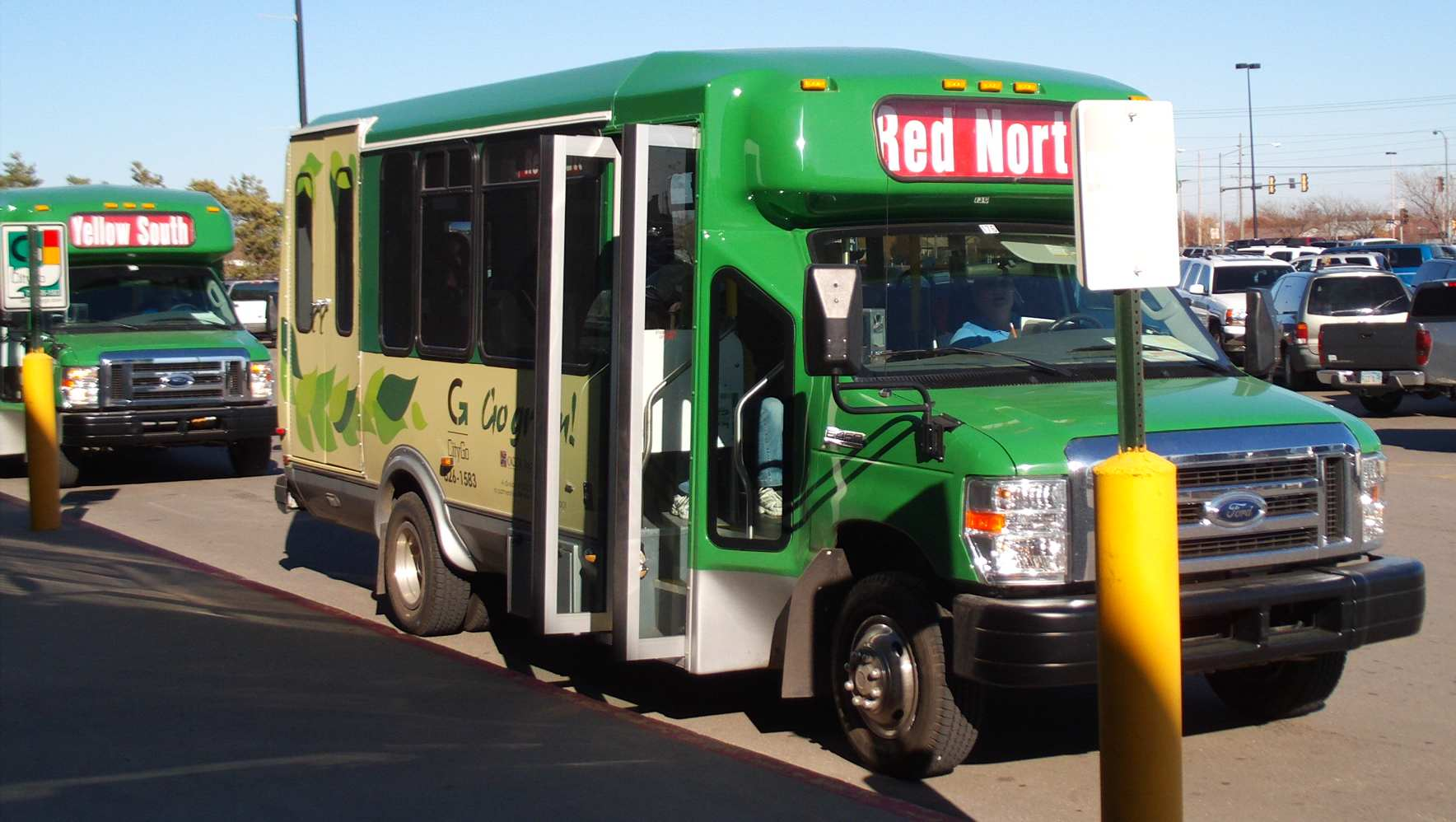
- Founded: 2008
- Headquarters: 340 N. Santa Fe Avenue
- Locale: Salina, Kansas
- Service area: Saline County, Kansas
- Service type: Bus, Fixed Route
- Routes: 5
- Stops: 214
- Fleet: 12 buses
- Operator: OCCK
- Chief executive: Patrick Wallerius
- Website: www.salinacitygo.com

CityGo is a local bus service in Salina, Kansas, operated by OCCK through partnership with the City of Salina and the Kansas Department of Transportation. The service was opened to the public in November 2008.

== Routes and operations ==
CityGo operates five fixed routes, all of which cover a significant and different area of the city, and terminate in downtown Salina where each route forms a loop. The routes are identified by color: The Blue (North) route serves the North part of Salina to Otis Avenue and terminates back at 7th and Walnut at the half hour. The same bus then switches to Blue East and serves the east part of Salina, all the way to the Presbyterian Manor, before terminating back at 7th and Walnut at the top of the hour when it switches to Blue North again. The red route serves central Salina and south Salina. The yellow route serves the east, central, and south part of Salina. The purple route serves the south and west portions of Salina, and is the only route that serves the airport, OCCK offices, various colleges and industry work. The Green route serves the west and north part of the city, with the northern part covering all the way up to and past Interstate 70. Each route operates on a regular one bus per hour schedule during non-peak hours, and two buses per hour during peak hours.

Route	Locations served and transfer points (T)
Blue	7th/Walnut (T), Faith(T), Central High School, Kenwood Cove, Mowery Clinic
Red	7th/Walnut (T), Salina Regional Health Center, South High School, Central Mall, Wal-Mart (T), Faith (T),
Yellow	7th/Walnut (T), Social Security Office, Wal-Mart (T), Central Mall, Kansas Wesleyan University, Salina Regional Health Center
Purple	7th/Walnut (T), Dillons at Sunset Plaza (T), Wal-Mart (T), K-State Salina,
Green	7th/Walnut (T), Dillons at Sunset Plaza (T), 9th & Hamilton (T), Iron Skillet, Salina Fieldhouse

=== Paratransit ===
OCCK offers origin-to-destination paratransit service to those with disabilities, the elderly, and others who meet eligibility requirements. The service is available from 6 am to 9 pm Monday through Friday, and 9 am to 5 pm on Saturday.

=== Inter-City (81 Connection) ===
OCCK also operates intercity bus service to areas around Salina, branded as 81 Connection.
