= Salina High School =

Salina High School may refer to:

- Salina High School Central, known as Salina High School before the construction of Salina High School South
- Salina High School South
