= Wonderly, Kansas =

Historical community in Kansas

Wonderly is a historical community in Saline County, Kansas, US. Located in Liberty Township, it is situated approximately 18 miles from Salina, the county seat. Established as a station on the Missouri Pacific Railroad, Wonderly was part of the rural development in the area during the early 20th century and was recorded as a town from 1888 to 1906.

As of 1910, the community had a population of 20 individuals and received its mail via rural delivery from Bridgeport. Today, the site of the former community is near the GPS coordinates 38.64112760967156, -97.54167425276233.

== History ==
Wonderly's origins date back to its establishment as a railroad station on the Missouri Pacific Railroad. It operated as a town from 1888 to 1906 and in the early 20th century, such stations were integral to the economic and social development of rural American communities, often acting as hubs for agricultural commerce. The mention of Hallville Station on historical maps corroborates the existence of a railroad community at the site of present-day Wonderly.

== Demographics ==
In 1910, Wonderly was recorded to have a population of 20. Information about the demographics of the community during its period of activity is limited to historical records from the era.

== Geography ==
Wonderly was located in Liberty Township, Saline County, Kansas, with the given coordinates marking its historical location.
