= Assaria, Kansas =

City in Saline County, Kansas

- City
- Location within Saline County and Kansas

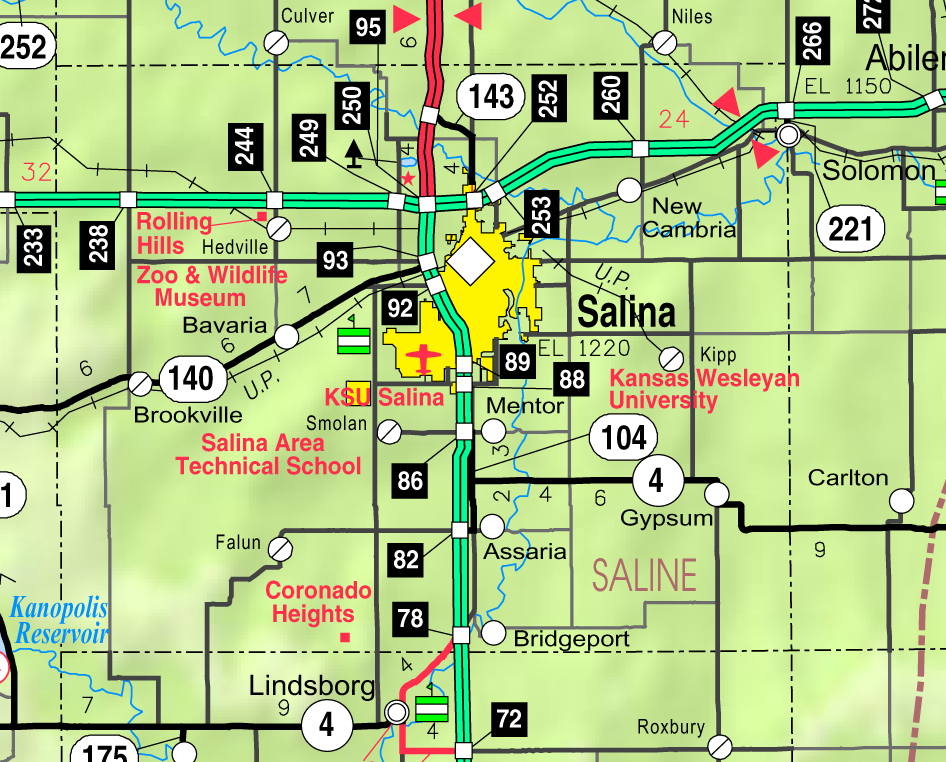
- KDOT map of Saline County (legend)
- Coordinates: 38°40′49″N 97°36′15″W
- Country: United States
- State: Kansas
- County: Saline
- Founded: 1879
- Platted: 1879
- Incorporated: 1886

Area
  - Total: 0.23 sq mi (0.60 km^{2})
  - Land: 0.23 sq mi (0.60 km^{2})
  - Water: 0 sq mi (0.00 km^{2})
- Elevation: 1,286 ft (392 m)

Population (2020)
  - Total: 428
  - Density: 1,800/sq mi (710/km^{2})
- Time zone: UTC-6 (CST)
  - Summer (DST): UTC-5 (CDT)
- ZIP Code: 67416
- Area code: 785
- FIPS code: 20-02850
- GNIS ID: 476952
- Website: assaria.krwa.net

Assaria is a city in Saline County, Kansas, United States. As of the 2020 census, the population of the city was 428.

== History ==
Assaria was laid out in 1879. The first post office in Assaria was established in September 1879.

A railroad previously ran north–south through Assaria, but it was later abandoned.

== Geography ==
Assaria is located at 38°40′49″N 97°36′15″W (38.680374, -97.604029). According to the United States Census Bureau, the city has a total area of 0.19 square miles (0.49 km^{2}), all land.

== Demographics ==
Historical population
Census	Pop.	Note	%±
1880	56		—
1890	180		221.4%
1900	214		18.9%
1910	246		15.0%
1920	234		−4.9%
1930	201		−14.1%
1940	232		15.4%
1950	221		−4.7%
1960	322		45.7%
1970	303		−5.9%
1980	414		36.6%
1990	387		−6.5%
2000	438		13.2%
2010	413		−5.7%
2020	428		3.6%
U.S. Decennial Census

It is part of the Salina Micropolitan Statistical Area.

=== 2020 census ===
The 2020 United States census counted 428 people, 169 households, and 117 families in Assaria. The population density was 1,829.1 per square mile (706.2/km^{2}). There were 176 housing units at an average density of 752.1 per square mile (290.4/km^{2}). The racial makeup was 95.79% (410) white or European American (94.16% non-Hispanic white), 0.7% (3) black or African-American, 0.0% (0) Native American or Alaska Native, 0.0% (0) Asian, 0.0% (0) Pacific Islander or Native Hawaiian, 0.93% (4) from other races, and 2.57% (11) from two or more races. Hispanic or Latino of any race was 3.74% (16) of the population.

Of the 169 households, 33.7% had children under the age of 18; 58.0% were married couples living together; 18.3% had a female householder with no spouse or partner present. 23.1% of households consisted of individuals and 12.4% had someone living alone who was 65 years of age or older. The average household size was 2.6 and the average family size was 2.9. The percent of those with a bachelor's degree or higher was estimated to be 19.4% of the population.

26.4% of the population was under the age of 18, 5.1% from 18 to 24, 24.8% from 25 to 44, 26.4% from 45 to 64, and 17.3% who were 65 years of age or older. The median age was 40.7 years. For every 100 females, there were 101.9 males. For every 100 females ages 18 and older, there were 105.9 males.

The 2016–2020 5-year American Community Survey estimates show that the median household income was $69,545 (with a margin of error of +/- $16,322) and the median family income was $69,688 (+/- $14,136). Males had a median income of $52,000 (+/- $12,479) versus $33,125 (+/- $8,594) for females. The median income for those above 16 years old was $38,036 (+/- $5,762). Approximately, 3.2% of families and 7.7% of the population were below the poverty line, including 8.3% of those under the age of 18 and 4.1% of those ages 65 or over.

=== 2010 census ===
As of the census of 2010, there were 413 people, 159 households, and 122 families living in the city. The population density was 2,173.7 inhabitants per square mile (839.3/km^{2}). There were 171 housing units at an average density of 900.0 per square mile (347.5/km^{2}). The racial makeup of the city was 98.3% White, 0.2% Native American, and 1.5% from two or more races. Hispanic or Latino of any race were 1.9% of the population.

There were 159 households, of which 34.6% had children under the age of 18 living with them, 65.4% were married couples living together, 6.3% had a female householder with no husband present, 5.0% had a male householder with no wife present, and 23.3% were non-families. 18.2% of all households were made up of individuals, and 7.6% had someone living alone who was 65 years of age or older. The average household size was 2.60 and the average family size was 2.95.

The median age in the city was 39.7 years. 27.4% of residents were under the age of 18; 6.3% were between the ages of 18 and 24; 22.6% were from 25 to 44; 30.4% were from 45 to 64; and 13.3% were 65 years of age or older. The gender makeup of the city was 50.8% male and 49.2% female.

=== 2000 census ===
As of the census of 2000, there were 438 people, 153 households, and 123 families living in the city. The population density was 2,220.0 inhabitants per square mile (857.1/km^{2}). There were 160 housing units at an average density of 811.0 per square mile (313.1/km^{2}). The racial makeup of the city was 95.43% White, 1.14% Native American, 0.23% Asian, 2.05% from other races, and 1.14% from two or more races. Hispanic or Latino of any race were 3.65% of the population.

There were 153 households, out of which 43.8% had children under the age of 18 living with them, 72.5% were married couples living together, 7.2% had a female householder with no husband present, and 19.0% were non-families. 15.7% of all households were made up of individuals, and 4.6% had someone living alone who was 65 years of age or older. The average household size was 2.86 and the average family size was 3.23.

In the city, the population was spread out, with 32.4% under the age of 18, 7.1% from 18 to 24, 29.9% from 25 to 44, 20.3% from 45 to 64, and 10.3% who were 65 years of age or older. The median age was 35 years. For every 100 females, there were 95.5 males. For every 100 females age 18 and over, there were 85.0 males.

The median income for a household in the city was $44,792, and the median income for a family was $45,833. Males had a median income of $34,063 versus $24,375 for females. The per capita income for the city was $19,381. None of the families and 1.9% of the population were living below the poverty line, including no under eighteens and 2.2% of those over 64.

== Economy ==
A Great Plains Manufacturing research and development facility is located in Assaria.

== Education ==
The community is served by Southeast of Saline USD 306 public school district. Southeast of Saline High School is located in Gypsum.

Assaria schools were closed through school unification. The Assaria Trojans won the Kansas State High School class B baseball championship in 1959 and 1960.

== Transportation ==
The Union Pacific Railroad formerly provided passenger rail service along a route from Salina to McPherson. Assaria saw multiple daily passenger trains until at least 1929 with mixed train service until at least 1959. As of 2025, the nearest passenger rail station is located in Newton, where Amtrak's Southwest Chief stops once daily on a route from Chicago to Los Angeles.
