= Southeast High School =

Southeast High School, South East High School, or Southeastern High School may refer to:

== California ==
- South East High School (South Gate, California)

== Florida ==
- Southeast High School (Florida) in Bradenton

== Illinois ==
- Southeastern High School (Illinois)
- Springfield Southeast High School

== Kansas ==
- South East High School (Kansas) in Cherokee, Kansas
- Southeast of Saline Secondary School in Gypsum
- Wichita High School Southeast

== Michigan ==
- Southeastern High School (Detroit, Michigan)

== Missouri ==
- Southeast High School (Missouri) in Kansas City, Missouri

== Nebraska ==
- Lincoln Southeast High School

== Ohio ==
- Southeast High School (Ohio) in Palmyra Township
- Southeastern High School (Chillicothe, Ohio)
- Southeastern Local High School (South Charleston, Ohio)

== Oklahoma ==
- Southeast High School (Oklahoma City, Oklahoma)
