= Bridgeport, Kansas =

Unincorporated community in Saline County, Kansas

- Unincorporated community and CDP
- Location within Saline County and Kansas

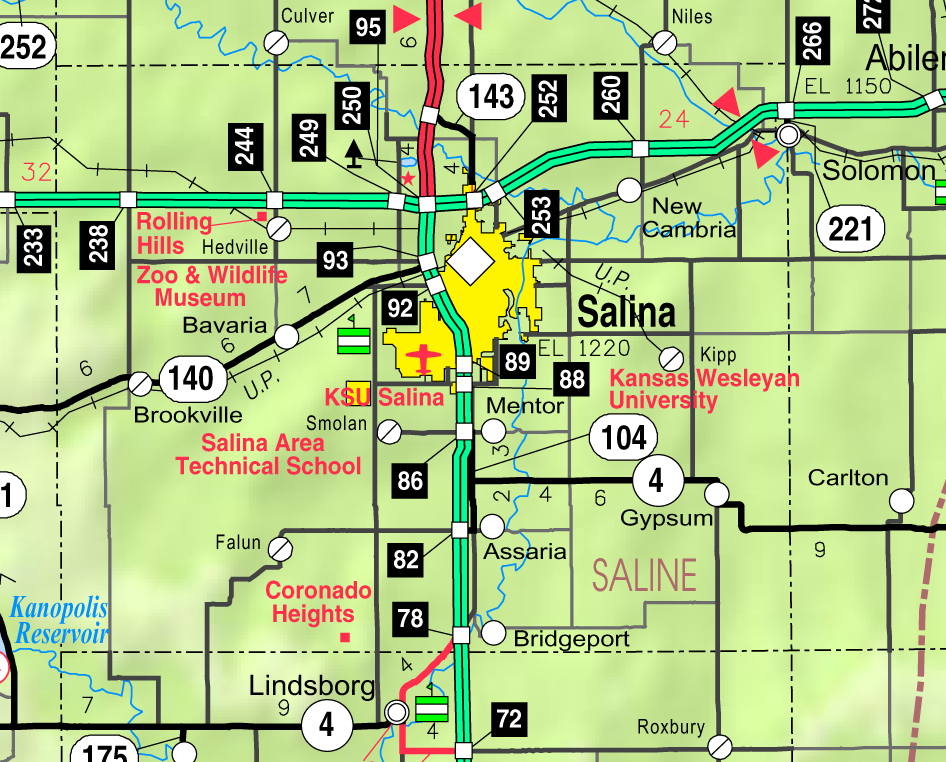
- KDOT map of Saline County (legend)
- Coordinates: 38°37′40″N 97°36′47″W
- Country: United States
- State: Kansas
- County: Saline
- Elevation: 1,303 ft (397 m)

Population (2020)
  - Total: 64
- Time zone: UTC-6 (CST)
  - Summer (DST): UTC-5 (CDT)
- ZIP Code: 67416
- Area code: 785
- FIPS code: 20-08450
- GNIS ID: 476951

Bridgeport is an unincorporated community and census-designated place (CDP) in Smoky View Township, Saline County, Kansas, United States. As of the 2020 census, the population was 64. It is located south of Salina, along K-4 near Interstate 135.

== History ==
A post office was opened in Bridgeport in 1879, and remained in operation until it was discontinued in 1976.

Two railroads previously ran through Bridgeport, but were later abandoned.

== Geography ==
The Smoky Hill River flows through the community. Its elevation is 1,302 feet (397 m), and it is located at 38°37′40″N 97°36′47″W (38.6277833, -97.6130924).

=== Climate ===
The climate in this area is characterized by hot, humid summers and generally mild to cool winters. According to the Köppen Climate Classification system, Bridgeport has a humid subtropical climate, abbreviated "Cfa" on climate maps.

== Demographics ==
Historical population
Census	Pop.	Note	%±
2020	64		—
U.S. Decennial Census

Bridgeport is a part of the Salina micropolitan area.

The 2020 United States census counted 64 people, 31 households, and 18 families in Bridgeport. The population density was 307.7 per square mile (118.8/km^{2}). There were 31 housing units at an average density of 149.0 per square mile (57.5/km^{2}). The racial makeup was 96.88% (62) white or European American (96.88% non-Hispanic white), 0.0% (0) black or African-American, 0.0% (0) Native American or Alaska Native, 0.0% (0) Asian, 0.0% (0) Pacific Islander or Native Hawaiian, 0.0% (0) from other races, and 3.12% (2) from two or more races. Hispanic or Latino of any race was 0.0% (0) of the population.

Of the 31 households, 35.5% had children under the age of 18; 51.6% were married couples living together; 19.4% had a female householder with no spouse or partner present. 35.5% of households consisted of individuals and 9.7% had someone living alone who was 65 years of age or older. The percent of those with a bachelor's degree or higher was estimated to be 0.0% of the population.

23.4% of the population was under the age of 18, 9.4% from 18 to 24, 25.0% from 25 to 44, 35.9% from 45 to 64, and 6.2% who were 65 years of age or older. The median age was 38.5 years. For every 100 females, there were 100.0 males. For every 100 females ages 18 and older, there were 81.5 males.

== Education ==
The community is served by Southeast of Saline USD 306 public school district.

== Transportation ==
The Union Pacific Railroad formerly provided passenger rail service along a route from Salina to McPherson. Bridgeport saw multiple daily passenger trains until at least 1929 with mixed train service until at least 1959. As of 2025, the nearest passenger rail station is located in Newton, where Amtrak's Southwest Chief stops once daily on a route from Chicago to Los Angeles.
