= Mentor, Kansas =

Unincorporated community in Saline County, Kansas

- Unincorporated community and CDP
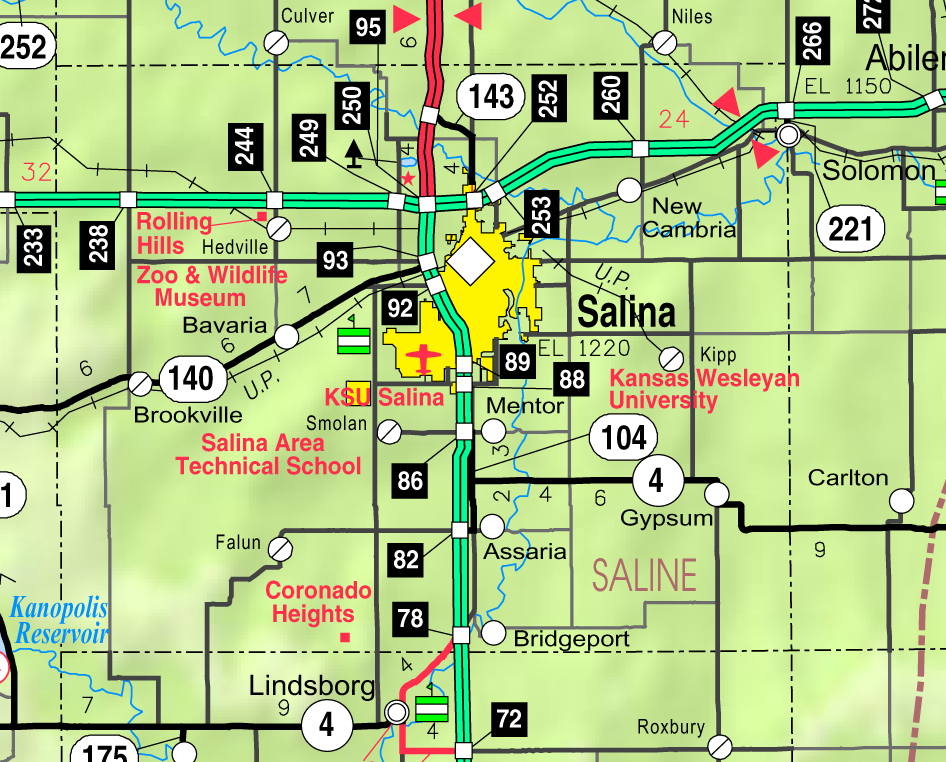
- KDOT map of Saline County (legend)

- Location within Kansas Location within the United States
- Coordinates: 38°44′26″N 97°36′11″W
- Country: United States
- State: Kansas
- County: Saline
- Elevation: 1,270 ft (390 m)

Population (2020)
  - Total: 101
- Time zone: UTC-6 (CST)
  - Summer (DST): UTC-5 (CDT)
- ZIP Code: 67416
- Area code: 785
- FIPS code: 20-45875
- GNIS ID: 476953

Mentor is an unincorporated community and census-designated place (CDP) in Saline County, Kansas, United States. As of the 2020 census, the population was 101. It is located south of Salina on Mentor Road.

== History ==
Mentor was named by settlers who hailed from Mentor, Ohio.

Mentor had a post office between 1881 and 1995.

A railroad previously ran north–south through Mentor, but it was later abandoned.

== Geography ==
Mentor is located at 38°44′26″N 97°36′11″W, which is approximately three miles south of Salina. It has an elevation of 1,273 feet (388 m).

== Demographics ==
Historical population
Census	Pop.	Note	%±
2020	101		—
U.S. Decennial Census

Mentor is a part of the Salina micropolitan area.

The 2020 United States census counted 101 people, 46 households, and 33 families in Mentor. The population density was 261.0 per square mile (100.8/km^{2}). There were 48 housing units at an average density of 124.0 per square mile (47.9/km^{2}). The racial makeup was 92.08% (93) white or European American (86.14% non-Hispanic white), 2.97% (3) black or African-American, 0.0% (0) Native American or Alaska Native, 0.0% (0) Asian, 0.0% (0) Pacific Islander or Native Hawaiian, 0.0% (0) from other races, and 4.95% (5) from two or more races. Hispanic or Latino of any race was 8.91% (9) of the population.

Of the 46 households, 19.6% had children under the age of 18; 60.9% were married couples living together; 17.4% had a female householder with no spouse or partner present. 21.7% of households consisted of individuals and 10.9% had someone living alone who was 65 years of age or older. The average household size was 2.2 and the average family size was 2.7. The percent of those with a bachelor's degree or higher was estimated to be 7.9% of the population.

14.9% of the population was under the age of 18, 3.0% from 18 to 24, 14.9% from 25 to 44, 37.6% from 45 to 64, and 29.7% who were 65 years of age or older. The median age was 54.5 years. For every 100 females, there were 110.4 males. For every 100 females ages 18 and older, there were 100.0 males.

== Education ==
The community is served by Southeast of Saline USD 306 public school district.

== Transportation ==
The Union Pacific Railroad formerly provided passenger rail service along a route from Salina to McPherson. Mentor saw multiple daily passenger trains until at least 1929 with mixed train service until at least 1959. As of 2025, the nearest passenger rail station is located in Newton, where Amtrak's Southwest Chief stops once daily on a route from Chicago to Los Angeles.
