= Salina USD 305 =

Public school district in Salina, Kansas

Address
- 1511 Gypsum Street Salina, Kansas, 67401; United States
- Coordinates: 38.8382°N 97.5876°W

District information
- Type: Public
- Grades: K to 12
- Schools: 12

Other information
- Website: usd305.com

Salina USD 305, also known as Salina Public Schools, is a public unified school district headquartered in Salina, Kansas, United States. The district includes the communities of Salina, Trenton, and nearby rural areas. As of 2018 the district had 7,144 students.

== Schools ==
The school district operates the following schools:

High Schools

- Salina High School Central
- Salina High School South

Middle Schools

- Lakewood Middle School
- South Middle School

Elementary Schools

- Coronado Elementary School
- Cottonwood Elementary School
- Heusner Elementary School
- Meadowlark Ridge Elementary School
- Oakdale Elementary School
- Schilling Elementary School
- Stewart Elementary School
- Sunset Elementary School

Preschool

- Heartland Early Education

== Academic achievement ==
In 2018, 26.87 percent of the students tested had an effective or excellent ability to understand and use the mathematics skills and knowledge needed for college and career readiness. In the same year 32.85 percent of the students tested had an effective or excellent ability to understand and use the English Language arts skills and knowledge needed for college and career readiness.

== See also ==
- List of unified school districts in Kansas
- List of high schools in Kansas
- Kansas State Department of Education
- Kansas State High School Activities Association
