= Adrianna Franch =

American soccer player (born 1990)

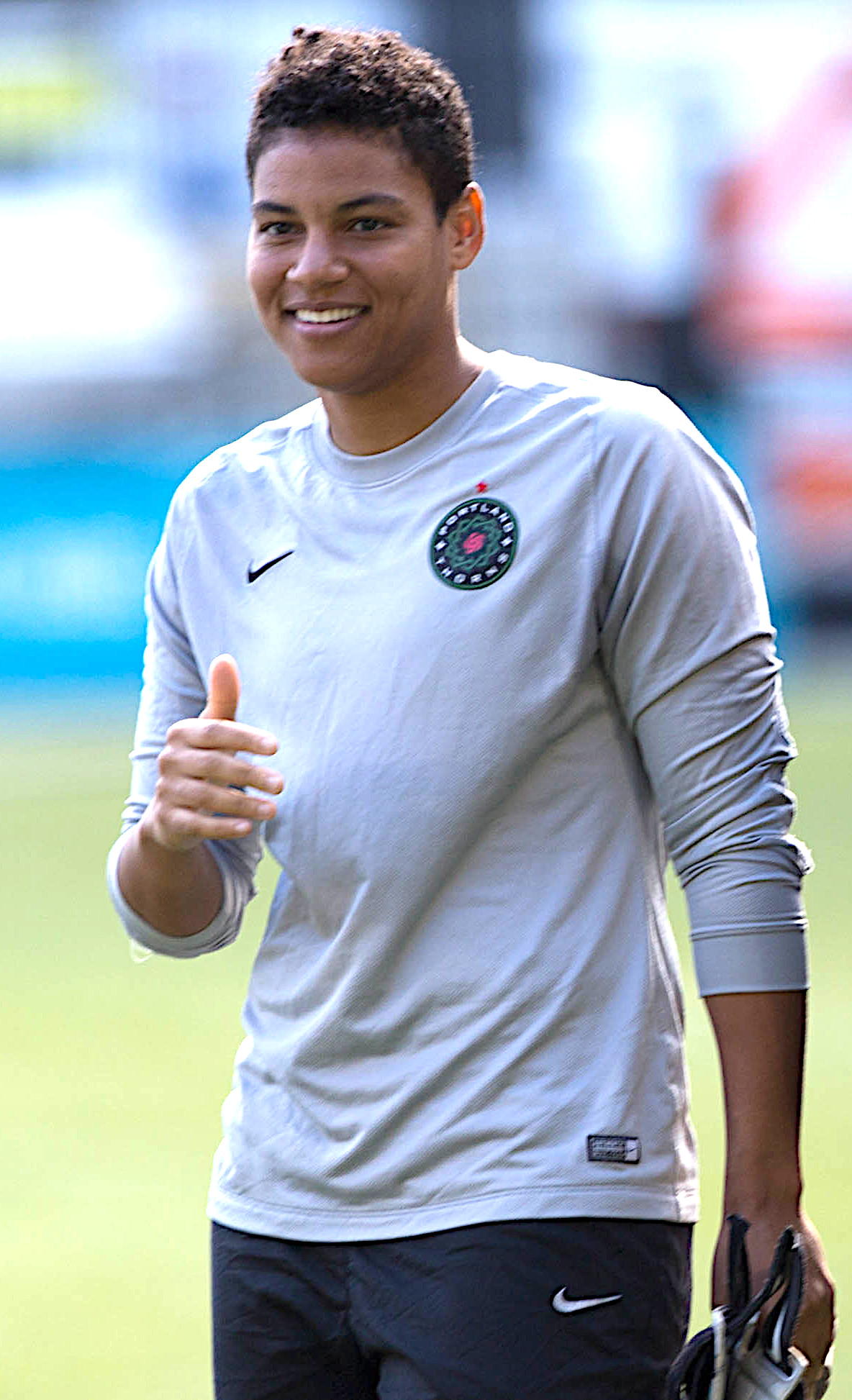
- Franch in 2016

Personal information
- Full name: Adrianna Nichole Franch
- Date of birth: November 12, 1990 (age 36)
- Place of birth: Salina, Kansas, United States
- Height: 5 ft 9 in (1.75 m)
- Position: Goalkeeper

College career
Years	Team	Apps	(Gls)
2009–2012	Oklahoma State Cowgirls		

Senior career*
Years	Team	Apps	(Gls)
2013	Western New York Flash	22	(0)
2015	Avaldsnes IL	12	(0)
2016–2021	Portland Thorns	44	(0)
2021–2024	Kansas City Current	21	(0)
2025–2026	Birmingham City	5	(0)

International career^{‡}
2010	United States U-20	7	(0)
2011–2013	United States U-23	5	(0)
2019–2021	United States	10	(0)
Medal record
Women's soccer
Representing the United States
Olympic Games
Bronze medal – third place	2020 Tokyo	Team
FIFA Women's World Cup
Gold medal – first place	2019 France	Team
- * Club domestic league appearances and goals as of 23:24, 16 March 2025 (UTC) ‡ National team caps and goals as of October 21, 2021

Adrianna Nichole "AD" Franch (born November 12, 1990) is an American professional soccer player who plays as a goalkeeper.

She previously played for Kansas City Current, and Portland Thorns FC, winning the NWSL Championship in 2017 with the latter team and being named NWSL Goalkeeper of the Year in 2017 and 2018.

Franch was first called up to the United States national team in 2012 and debuted for the team in 2019.

== Early life ==
Franch grew up in Salina, Kansas. She attended Salina South High School and was the starting goalkeeper for three seasons, but did not play her senior season due to an injury suffered playing basketball. She earned All-State, All-Southwest Region and All-League honors, as well as league MVP during her time at South. Franch was also a star basketball player earning first-team All-County and All-League honors as well as an honorable mention All-State performer.

Franch was a three-year member of the Kansas Olympic Development Program (ODP) team. She played on the Region II ODP team and was an ODP National Pool player in 2006. She led her club team, the KC Comets Select, to a Kansas state championship in 2006 and to the Kansas state finals in 2007 and 2008.

As a child, Franch's favorite goalkeeper was women's national team keeper, Briana Scurry, and people used to call her the "next Bri Scurry."

=== Oklahoma State University ===
Franch was the starting goalkeeper for Oklahoma State University as a freshman in 2009, playing in 24 games and allowing just 14 goals for a 0.61 GAA. She went 15–6–2 with 11 shutouts and was named First-Team All-Big 12. Franch played a key role in the Cowgirls winning the Big 12 tournament for their second time ever.

Franch is considered one of the most decorated players in Big 12 Conference and Oklahoma State University soccer history. She is a two-time All-American and a two-time MAC Hermann Trophy semifinalist. During each of her four seasons with Oklahoma State, she was named to the All-Big 12 First Team, the seventh player in Big 12 Conference history to achieve that distinction.

Franch holds the OSU career record for shutouts with 38 and led the Big 12 in the same category in three of her four seasons. She finished her career with 325 saves ranking second the program's history. Franch's 38 shutouts rank sixth all time in NCAA history, and her 8,064:02 minutes in goal rank ninth on the NCAA list. As a junior, she ranked second in the NCAA in goals against average (0.348) and third in save percentage (0.92). She also set OSU's single-season record with 12 shutouts.

In 2010, Franch became the first Oklahoma State soccer player to play for a United States national team when she was called up to the United States U-20 team.

== Club career ==
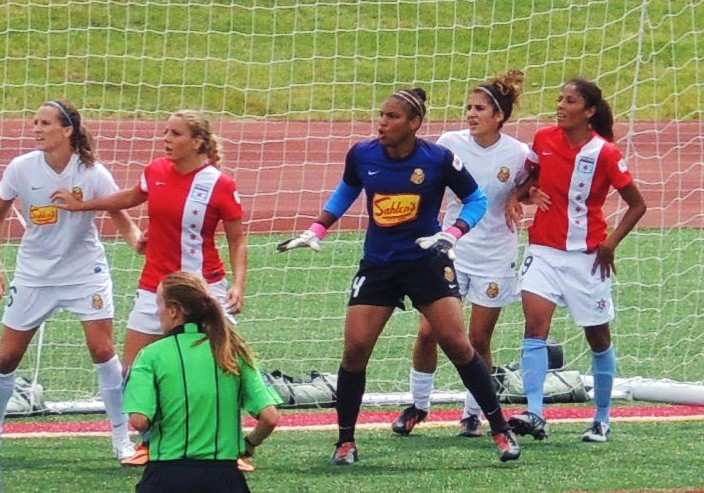
July 4, 2013; Adrianna Franch defending a corner kick in Chicago Red Stars vs Western New York Flash. Left to right:Katherine Reynolds-16, Adriana Leon-16, Adrianna Franch-24, Angela Salem-6, Maribel Dominguez-9

=== Western New York Flash, 2013–2014 ===
On January 18, 2013, Franch was the sixth pick during the first round of the 2013 college draft of National Women's Soccer League; the first goalkeeper picked by any team and the first player picked by Western New York Flash. Franch said of the Flash, "They are a very strong team that plays together and knows how to win. It's an environment that I'm really excited to be around because they have a lot of drive and heart." During the team's first regular season match against Sky Blue FC, Franch made six saves. Although the Flash lost 1–0 due to an own goal, Franch was heralded as a tremendous force in the goal and a future prospect at the 2015 FIFA Women's World Cup. She came second in voting for NWSL Rookie of the Year in 2013.

Franch missed the 2014 National Women's Soccer League season due to a torn anterior cruciate ligament.

=== Avaldsnes IL, 2015 ===
After rehabilitating her injury, Franch joined Avaldsnes IL, a Norwegian club competing in the Toppserien, in 2015. She started 12 matches and played 1080 minutes for the team, recording 4 shutouts. The team finished the 2015 Toppserien in second place.

=== Portland Thorns FC, 2016–2021 ===
On December 10, 2015, Franch signed with the National Women's Soccer League club, Portland Thorns FC, after rights to her were traded from the expansion Orlando Pride. As a back-up keeper to Michelle Betos she helped the Thorns win the NWSL Shield in the 2016 season, recording three shutouts in six appearances. As starting keeper in 2017, she set a league record with 11 shutouts in the regular season, helped the Thorns win the NWSL Championship in a 1–0 shutout over the North Carolina Courage, and was named NWSL Goalkeeper of the Year.

After starting the first 3 games of the 2018 season, Franch missed the next 9 games after undergoing surgery to repair a slight meniscus tear in her knee. She returned to the field on June 22 against the Houston Dash. Franch was named Player of the Week, for week 14 after recording 11 saves during the Thorns two games that week. Franch was named to the 2018 NWSL Best XI and was awarded NWSL Goalkeeper of the Year for the second straight year, becoming the first player to win the award twice.

=== Kansas City 2021-2024 ===
On August 17, 2021, it was announced Franch would be traded to Kansas City in exchange for goalkeeper Abby Smith and $150,000 in allocation money.

=== Birmingham City 2025–2026 ===
On 15 March 2025, it was announced that Franch would leave Kansas City and had signed a deal with Birmingham City until the end of the season. On August 5, 2025, it was announced that she had signed a one-year contract, extending her time with the club.

== International career ==
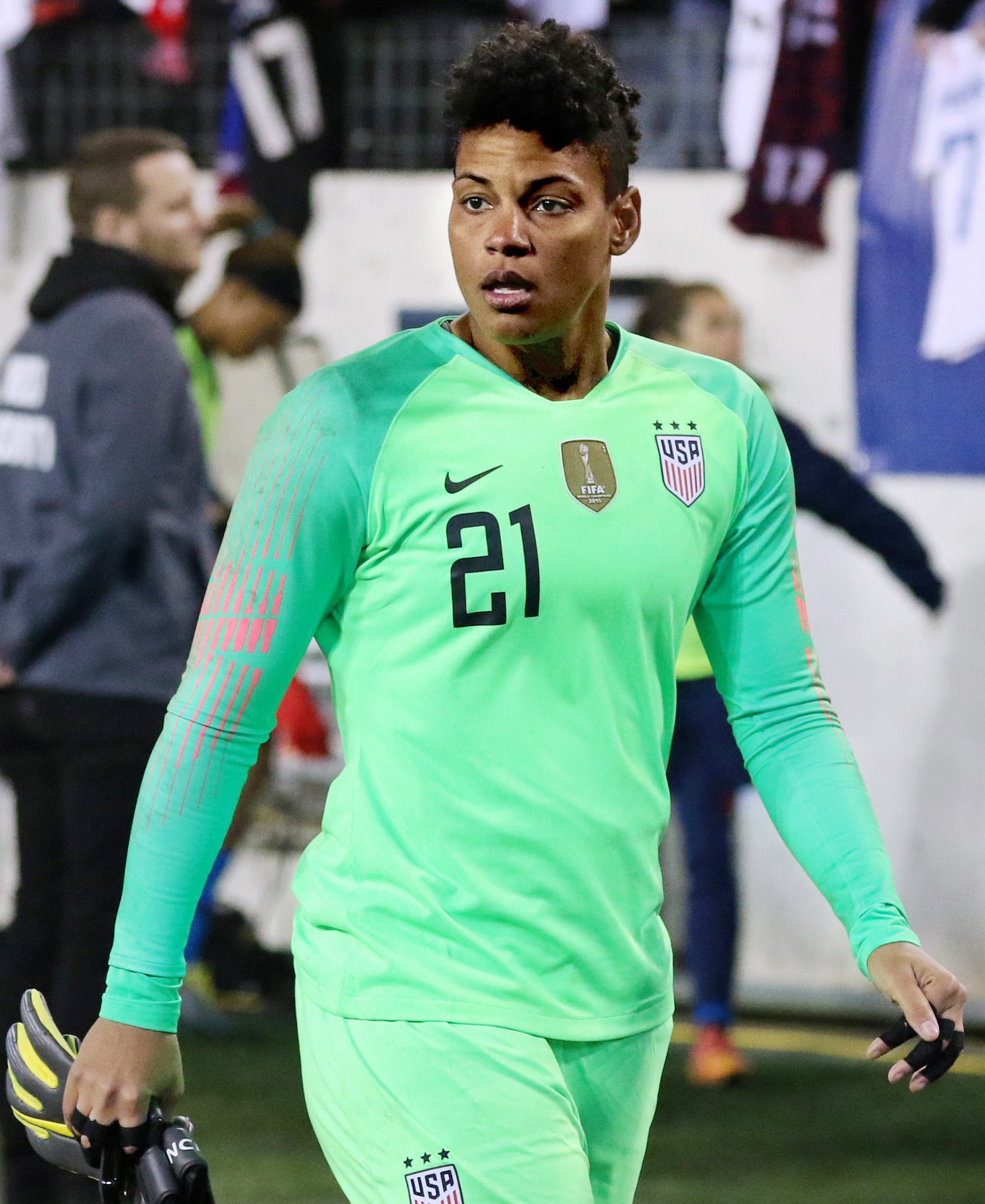
Franch in her first cap with the USWNT against England on March 2, 2019.

Franch has played for the United States U-20, U-23, and senior USWNT teams. Her first ever call-up to the U.S. youth national teams came at the end of 2009 when she was called to U-20 camp in Sunrise, Florida. Her first international caps came at the La Manga Tournament in Spain in March 2010, where she played against Norway and Germany, earning a win and a tie.

In May 2012, Franch was called up to train with the United States women's national soccer team in preparation for the 2012 Summer Olympics by coach, Pia Sundhage. In March 2013, she was named to the senior team roster by USWNT coach, Tom Sermanni for upcoming exhibition matches against Germany and the Netherlands.

Franch was called into the United States women's national soccer team January 2016 training camp by coach Jill Ellis. and again for the June 2016 friendlies against Japan. She was called to training camp in November 2016 but unable to attend the camp.

In January 2018 Franch received a call-up to USWNT annual January training camp. She was also named to the roster for the 2018 Tournament of Nations, the United States won the tournament but Franch did not see any playing time as USWNT number one keeper Alyssa Naeher played all three games. Franch was called into camp for a set of friendlies against Chile in August 2018, but once again she did not see any playing time. Franch was named to the preliminary 35 person roster for the 2018 CONCACAF Women's Championship but wasn't named to the final 20 person roster, but it was announced that she would still join the team to assist in preparation.

Franch was called up to the senior national team for friendlies in Portugal and Scotland in November 2018. In January 2019, she participated in the USWNT's annual January training camp, held in the Algarve region of Portugal. Franch remained with the national team for subsequent matches against France and Spain, but was not awarded any playing time.

In February 2019, U.S. Soccer announced that Franch would be on the WNT roster for the SheBelieves Cup. Franch played the entirety of the USWNT's second match of the tournament, a 2–2 draw against England. This marked her first-ever start and cap with the senior national team.

== Personal life ==
Franch grew up in Salina, Kansas with her mom and two siblings. When she was ten, her family purchased a home through Habitat for Humanity which she and her mom helped build.

Franch married her wife Emily Boscacci on December 21, 2019.

For the second match of the 2019 SheBelieves Cup, Franch replaced her own name on her game jersey with that of former national team goalkeeper Briana Scurry, whom she had met as a child.

== Career statistics ==
Appearances and goals by national team and year
National team	Year	Apps	Goals
United States	2019	3	0
United States	2020	1	0
United States	2021	6	0
Total		10	0

== Honors ==
Western New York Flash

- NWSL Shield: 2013

Portland Thorns

- NWSL Champions: 2017
- NWSL Shield: 2016
- NWSL Challenge Cup: 2021

Kansas City Current

- NWSL x Liga MX Femenil Summer Cup: 2024

Birmingham City

- Women's Super League 2: 2025–26

International

- FIFA Women's World Cup: 2019
- Olympic Bronze Medal: 2020
- CONCACAF Women's Olympic Qualifying Tournament: 2020
- SheBelieves Cup: 2020, 2023
- Tournament of Nations: 2018

Individual

- NWSL Goalkeeper of the Year: 2017, 2018
- NWSL Best XI: 2017, 2018
- NWSL Second XI: 2013
- CONCACAF Goalkeeper of the Year: 2017
