= Southeast of Saline USD 306 =

Public school district near Gypsum, Kansas

Address
- 5056 E. K-4 Highway Gypsum, Kansas, 67448; United States
- Coordinates: 38.7093°N 97.5096°W

District information
- Type: Public
- Grades: K to 12
- Schools: 2

Other information
- Website: www.usd306.org

Southeast of Saline USD 306 is a public unified school district headquartered approximately 4 mi (6.4 km) west of Gypsum, Kansas, United States. The district includes the communities of Assaria, Bridgeport, Gypsum, Kipp, Mentor, a tiny amount of the south side of Salina, and nearby rural areas.

== Schools ==
The school district operates the following schools:

- Southeast of Saline Junior-Senior High School, west of Gypsum
- Southeast of Saline Elementary School, west of Gypsum

== See also ==
- List of unified school districts in Kansas
- List of high schools in Kansas
- Kansas State Department of Education
- Kansas State High School Activities Association
