= Salina High School Central =

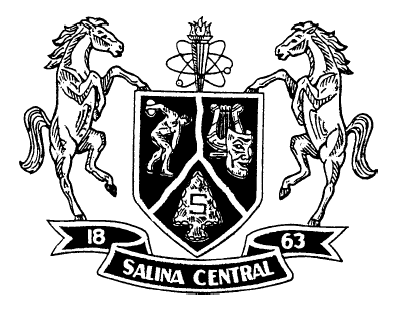

Location
- 650 East Crawford Street; Salina, Kansas 67401; United States; 38°49′32.2″N 97°36′8.1″W

Information
- School type: Public, High School
- Motto: We Are SC
- Established: 1863
- School district: Salina USD 305
- CEEB code: 172685
- Principal: Tiffany Lowe
- Faculty: 80
- Grades: 9 to 12
- Gender: coed
- Enrollment: 950 (2023–2024)
- Schedule: Block schedule (maroon and white days)
- Colors: Maroon; White
- Song: Central High Alma Mater
- Fight song: On Salina
- Athletics: Class 5A; District 6
- Athletics conference: AVCTL I & II
- Mascot: Mustangs
- Rival: Salina South, Derby High School
- Newspaper: The Pylon
- Website: www.305centralhigh.com

Salina High School Central, often referred to as Salina Central, is a fully accredited public high school located in Salina, Kansas, serving students in grades 9–12. The school was known as Salina High School before the opening of Salina High School South in 1971. Located at 650 East Crawford in the city of Salina, the school is attended by Salina USD 305 students living north of Republic Avenue. The athletic programs compete in the Ark Valley Chisholm Trail League of the 5A division according to the KSHSAA. The Salina High School Central campus is home of the Salina Stadium.

== History ==
=== Early history ===
Prior to the addition of Salina High School South to the district in 1971, the school was originally called Salina High School. The present building at the intersection of Front and Crawford Streets was dedicated October 27, 1952 at 7:30 PM in the school's auditorium. The building replaced the Washington High School building on 3rd Street. Architects from Wilson & Company designed the building which was constructed by Bauman & Borden Construction Co. W.M. Ostenberg was the Superintendent of the Salina School System and Owen E. Hodgson was the principal of the high school when the new building opened. The building was quite modern by standards of the day and was considered the premiere high school facility in the state of Kansas. The building had approximately 150,000 square feet (14,000 m^{2}) of space divided into classrooms, recreation and public use, and stairways and halls. There were 37 functional classrooms, four rooms used for libraries, a recital hall, and an art gallery and visual education. The four other rooms include the gymnasium, auditorium, cafeteria, and concourse. The current cafeteria, non-spectator gym and the block of classrooms located at the south end of the building was added in the 1960s. The library expansion occurred in the early 1990s. The construction on the stadium located to the east of the building was completed in 1965.

=== Recent years ===
Beginning in the fall of 2007, a new physical fitness wing was added to the building. This addition included a new weight room, wrestling room, health classroom, two new locker rooms, a training room, and various offices. The project was completed and open for the beginning of the 2008–2009 school year. Over the 2008 summer, the new tennis complex was completed replacing the small, aging courts. Eight new courts were added just north of the stadium with a new softball field being added just northeast of the stadium.

== Location ==
The school is located at 650 E. Crawford in Salina, Kansas. Attendance for Salina high schools is determined by residence relative to Cloud Street, within various elementary school residential districts. Students living in the Cottonwood, Heusner, Meadowlark, and Oakdale elementary school attendance districts will attend Central. Students living in the Coronado, Schilling, Sunset, and Stewart districts will attend South.

== Academic achievement ==
In 2018, 80.61 percent of sophomores tested in the Kansas Assessment Program were below 300, the equivalent of the college ready benchmark of 22 on the ACT in math.

== Extracurricular activities ==
=== Athletics ===
Salina Central offers a wide variety of athletic programs due to the school's size. The athletic teams are commonly known as the "Mustangs" and are classified as 5A according to the KSHSAA. Throughout its history, Salina Central has won many state championships in various sports.

=== Football ===
Throughout its history, the Mustang football team has won 7 state championships, occurring in 1993, 1996, 1999, 2001, 2002, 2005, and 2025. Additionally, the Mustangs had back-to-back-to-back undefeated regular seasons and held a 46-game winning-streak in district play from 1991 to 2007, until they were defeated by Topeka Seaman High School.

=== Tennis ===
The men's tennis program recorded its 6th consecutive KSHSAA 5A state title in 2009. The men's tennis team currently owns eleven state titles, while the lady's tennis team owns three.

=== Forensics ===
In 2005 and 2006 the forensics team placed second in the state, and in 2007 they won 5A state breaking the all-time state record for number of points with 392. They then proceeded to win state four times in a row through 2010.

=== State championships ===
State Championships
Season	Sport	Number of Championships	Year	Reference
Fall	Football	7	1993, 1996, 1999, 2001, 2002, 2005, 2025	
Fall	Cross Country, Boys	1	1963	
Winter	Wrestling	2	1949, 1967	
Winter	Basketball, Boys	4	1963, 1971, 1975, 1983	
Winter	Bowling, Boys	1	2020	
Spring	Tennis, Boys	13	1993, 1998, 2000, 2004, 2005, 2006, 2007, 2008, 2009, 2013, 2014, 2019, 2021	
Spring	Tennis, Girls	5	1970, 1981, 2002, 2003, 2004	
Spring	Track and Field, Girls	1	2002	
Spring	Track and Field, Boys	2	1981, 1985	
Spring	Forensics	6	2007, 2008, 2009, 2010, 2012, 2013	
Total		41		

Salina High School Central offers the extracurricular activities:

=== Fall ===
- Football
- Volleyball
- Boys cross-country
- Girls cross-country
- Girls golf
- Boys soccer
- Girls tennis
- V.E.T.S. (Dance Team)
- Cheerleading
- Color Guard
- Debate
- Scholars' Bowl (also competes during winter)

=== Winter ===
- Boys basketball
- Girls basketball
- Wrestling
- Boys swimming/diving
- V.E.T.S. (Dance Team)
- Winter cheerleading
- Bowling

=== Spring ===
- Baseball
- Boys golf
- Boys tennis
- Girls soccer
- Girls swimming/diving
- Softball
- Boys track and field
- Girls track and field
- Forensics

=== Fine arts ===
Salina Central has become a front runner in theatre. Thespian Troupe 639 presented Noises Off! at the Kansas State Thespian Conference in Wichita in January 2008. The troupe also took Noises Off! to the International Thespian Festival held in Lincoln, Nebraska over the week of June 23–29, 2008. It was one of 12 schools invited to perform at the festival, and one of two from Kansas. In the summer of 2010, Salina Central performed its second show in three years at the International Thespian Festival with the one-act The Least Offensive Play in the Whole Darn World. Troupe 639 took the play "Funny Money" to International Thespian Festival in June 2012, and also took the comedy “Fox on The Fairway” to International Thespian Festival in June 2017.

Later, Troupe 639 would have its one-act “Lockdown” chosen as the Kansas Chapter select. Although “Lockdown” was meant to be performed at International Thespian Festival 2020, it was streamed on Virtual International Thespian Festival 2020 due to the COVID-19 pandemic.

The following school year, Troupe 639's “Antigone” directed by Barbara Hilt was chosen as a main-stage performance for Virtual Kansas Thespian Festival.

Central also has a choir program with about 150 students. In the 2012 contest season, many of the groups and soloist received 1 ratings.

== Notable alumni ==
- Walter Shublom - (Class of 1941), former high school, junior college and college basketball coach, inducted into the National High School Hall of Fame in 1982
- Roy Applequist - (Class of 1964), agriculture manufacturing company founder
- Steven Hawley - (Class of 1969), United States astronaut
- Lawton Nuss - (Class of 1970), Kansas Supreme Court Justice
- Bill Graves - (Class of 1971), 43rd Governor of the State of Kansas
- Tyrees Allen - (Class of 1972), actor on television, stage, and film
- Joe Miller - (Class of 1985), Republican nominee for the U.S. Senate from Alaska
- Terence Newman - (Class of 1998), former defensive back for the Dallas Cowboys Cincinnati Bengals and Minnesota Vikings

== See also ==
- Salina High School South
- Southeast of Saline
- List of high schools in Kansas
- List of unified school districts in Kansas
