= North Central Kansas =

Tourism region in the United States

Coordinates: 39.3°N 97.5°W

North Central Kansas is a tourism and geographical region of the state of Kansas. It consists of 15 counties, and has a population of over 150,000. The Salina micropolitan area is part of North Central Kansas. The region stretches from the Nebraska border in the north to Russell, Ellsworth, Saline, and Dickinson Counties in the south. Its western border includes Smith, Osborne, and Russell Counties, and its eastern border Dickinson, Clay, Washington, and Marshall Counties.

The 15 counties included in the region are:

- Clay
- Cloud
- Dickinson
- Ellsworth
- Jewell
- Lincoln
- Marshall
- Mitchell
- Ottawa
- Osborne
- Republic
- Russell
- Saline
- Smith
- Washington
