= Roy Applequist =

American businessman (born 1946)

- Born: June 3, 1946 (age 79); Salina, Kansas, U.S.
- Education: North Park University (BA, 1968)
- Known for: Farm equipment manufacturing

Roy Applequist (born June 3, 1946) is an American businessman who owned Great Plains Manufacturing from 1976 to 2016 and Applequist Manufacturing starting in 2018, both farm equipment companies based in Kansas.

== Early life ==
Roy Applequist was born on June 3, 1946, in Salina, Kansas. He attended Salina High School, graduating in 1964. In 1968, he earned his Bachelor of Arts degree in economics from North Park University in Chicago before returning to Salina. Soon after he returned, the foundry manager of his father's agricultural manufacturing business, Roberts Industries, resigned. Applequist filled the position until the company was sold in to Federal-Mogul in 1976.

== Great Plains Manufacturing ==
The sale of Roberts Industries prompted Applequist to found his own farm equipment business, Great Plains Manufacturing, on April 1, 1976. He originally started it in the same building where his father's business formed, but moved operations to Assaria, Kansas in 1979. In late 1981, Applequist added a new facility in Salina.

In 1982, Applequist started a trucking division of Great Plains Manufacturing to deliver the company's products and transport raw materials.

The corporate headquarters also moved to a building in Salina in 1995.

Great Plains Manufacturing sold its products in all 50 U.S. states and internationally before being sold to Kubota for $430 million in July 2016 (equivalent to $560 million in 2024).

=== Recognition ===
In 2006, Applequist was inducted into the Salina Business Hall of Fame. That year, Great Plains Manufacturing was named the Kansas Governor's Exporter of the Year for its international success.

Applequist was inducted into the Kansas Business Hall of Fame as its contemporary honoree in 2010. He also received No-Till Farmer magazine's No-Till Innovator Award in 2010 for his role in pioneering the no-till farming drill and his companies efforts in educating farmers about new agriculture techniques.

== Applequist Manufacturing ==
In 2018, about two years after his sale of Great Plains Manufacturing, Roy started a new agricultural equipment business in Smith Center, Kansas, called Applequist Manufacturing. Construction of its 138,000-square-foot (12,800 m^{2}) production facility began in January 2019 and is now complete. Applequist Manufacturing's headquarters are in Assaria.
