= Salina High School South =

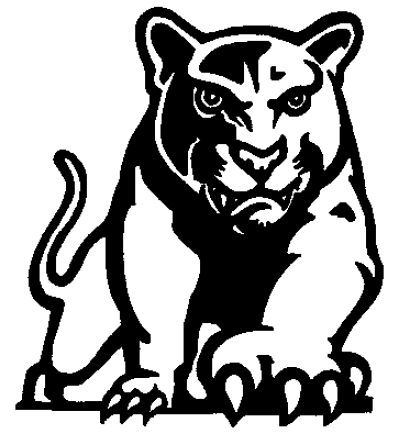

Location
- 730 East Magnolia Road; Salina, Kansas 67401; United States; 38°47′47″N 97°35′59″W

Information
- School type: Public, High School
- Established: 1971
- School district: Salina USD 305
- CEEB code: 172687
- Principal: Ginger Jones
- Grades: 9 to 12
- Gender: coed
- Enrollment: 1,064 (2023-2024)
- Colors: Green; Gold; White
- Athletics: Class 5A; District 6
- Athletics conference: AVCTL I & II
- Mascot: Cougars
- Rival: Salina Central
- Accreditation: Blue Ribbon 1984
- Website: School Website

Salina High School South is a public school located in Salina, Kansas, serving students in grades 9-12. It is operated by Salina USD 305 school district, and students who live south of Cloud Avenue attend this school. It serves approximately 1,057 students each year, and about 90% of the staff employed at the school are certified, including principal Ginger Jones. The school colors are green, gold, and white. The school mascot is the Cougar. The athletic teams offered at Salina South are varied and compete in the 5A division according to the KSHSAA.

== History ==
Salina South High School was established in 1971 due to overcrowding at Salina Central High School. The school was selected as a Blue Ribbon School in 1984. The Blue Ribbon Award recognizes public and private schools which perform at high levels or have made significant academic improvements. The school has additionally been through multiple renovations with the most recent being in 2016–18.

== School layout ==
Salina South was formerly a brown building distinctly recognized by its three "pods" (circular hallways named the 200, 300, and 400 Pods). The "pod" design featured doorless classrooms with faux walls and very few windows. In April 2014, a $110 million bond was approved which would fund a whole new school, due to the "pods" being in poor condition. The new building was built in 3 phases from 2016 to 2018 as part of a district wide remodeling of schools. The new building contains many windows, increased security, larger classrooms, a school store, a coffee bar, and a more modern design from the old "pod" design.

== Extracurricular activities ==
=== Athletics ===
==== Football ====
In 2000, the football team won the 5A state championship with a victory over Pittsburg High School. The football team repeated as state champions in 2004 with a victory over Olathe North High School.

=== State championships ===
State Championships
Season	Sport	Number of Championships	Year
Fall	Football	2	2000, 2004
Fall	Soccer, Boys	1	2015
Fall	Cross Country, Boys	2	1984, 1990
Fall	Cross Country, Girls	1	1984
Fall	Gymnastics, Boys	2	1973, 1974
Winter	Swimming and Diving, Boys	3	1973, 1983, 2010
Winter	Bowling, Girls	1	2020
Spring	Baseball	1	1993
Spring	Softball	2	1995, 2003
Spring	Track & Field, Girls	1	1979
Total		16	

=== Fall ===
- Football
- Cross Country
- Girls Tennis
- Volleyball
- Cheerleading
- Marching Band
- Girls Golf
- Boys Soccer

=== Winter ===
- Basketball
- Wrestling
- Boys Swimming
- Bowling

=== Spring ===
- Girls Soccer
- Baseball
- Boys Golf
- Boys Tennis
- Softball
- Track and Field
- Girls Swimming

=== Non-athletic programs ===
- 2006 - The debate team qualified a Policy Debate Team for the National Forensics League National Tournament for the first time since 1995. This same team, composed of Bret Higgins and Josh Harzman won the 5A 2-Speaker Debate State Tournament. The same year Bret Higgins won the 5A Lincoln-Douglas Debate State Championship.
- 2007 - The Salina South Theatre department's production of Guys and Dolls received national recognition from USA Weekend's High School Musical Showstopper as one of the top high school productions in America.
- 1984-2005 - The school marching band, the Salina South Marching Cougars, received 21 straight "Superior" ratings for their field performances at the annual Central States Marching Festival held at Kansas State University in Manhattan, Kansas under the leadership of director Randall Fillmore.

== Notable alumni ==
- Anne Boyer (class of 1991), poet and essayist
- Adrianna Franch (class of 2009), professional soccer player for Birmingham City
- Mark Stucky (class of 1976), test pilot, astronaut
- Brent Venables, head football coach at the University of Oklahoma

== See also ==
- Salina High School Central
- Southeast of Saline
- List of high schools in Kansas
- List of unified school districts in Kansas
