= Gypsum, Kansas =

City in Saline County, Kansas

- City
- Location within Saline County and Kansas

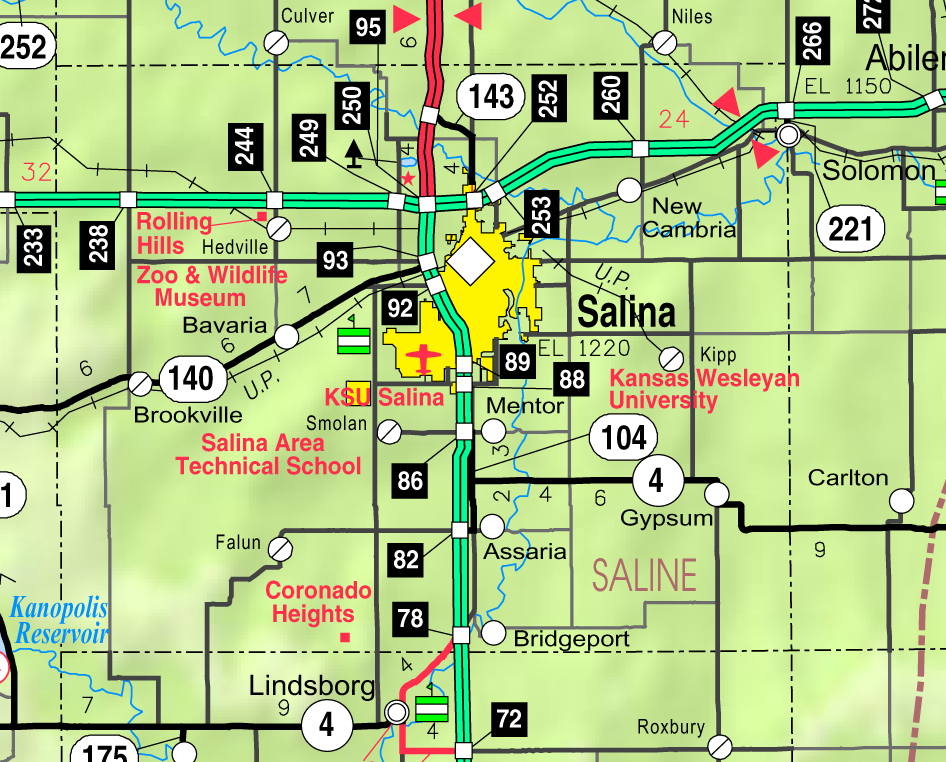
- KDOT map of Saline County (legend)
- Coordinates: 38°42′20″N 97°25′41″W
- Country: United States
- State: Kansas
- County: Saline
- Founded: 1800s
- Incorporated: 1887
- Named for: Gypsum Creek

Government
  - Type: Mayor–Council

Area
  - Total: 0.37 sq mi (0.97 km^{2})
  - Land: 0.37 sq mi (0.97 km^{2})
  - Water: 0 sq mi (0.00 km^{2})
- Elevation: 1,227 ft (374 m)

Population (2020)
  - Total: 400
  - Density: 1,100/sq mi (410/km^{2})
- Time zone: UTC-6 (CST)
  - Summer (DST): UTC-5 (CDT)
- ZIP Code: 67448
- Area code: 785
- FIPS code: 20-29250
- GNIS ID: 476963
- Website: City Website

Gypsum is a city in Saline County, Kansas, United States. As of the 2020 census, the population of the city was 400.

== History ==
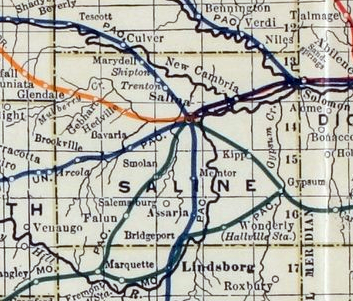
1915 railroad map of Saline County

=== Early history ===
For many millennia, the Great Plains of North America was inhabited by nomadic Native Americans. From the 16th century to 18th century, the Kingdom of France claimed ownership of large parts of North America. In 1762, after the French and Indian War, France secretly ceded New France to Spain, per the Treaty of Fontainebleau.

=== 19th century ===
In 1802, Spain returned most of the land to France. In 1803, most of the land for modern day Kansas was acquired by the United States from France as part of the 828,000 square mile Louisiana Purchase for 2.83 cents per acre.

In 1854, the Kansas Territory was organized, then in 1861 Kansas became the 34th U.S. state. In 1860, Saline County was established within the Kansas Territory, which included the land for modern day Gypsum.

The community was founded as a Templer community called Tempelfeld. Gypsum was named after Gypsum Creek. The Gypsum post office has operated under that name since 1886.

== Geography ==
Gypsum is located at 38°42′18″N 97°25′37″W (38.705118, -97.426876). According to the United States Census Bureau, the city has a total area of 0.36 square miles (0.93 km^{2}), all land.

== Demographics ==
Historical population
Census	Pop.	Note	%±
1890	530		—
1900	552		4.2%
1910	623		12.9%
1920	732		17.5%
1930	638		−12.8%
1940	615		−3.6%
1950	523		−15.0%
1960	593		13.4%
1970	391		−34.1%
1980	423		8.2%
1990	365		−13.7%
2000	414		13.4%
2010	405		−2.2%
2020	400		−1.2%
U.S. Decennial Census

It is part of the Salina Micropolitan Statistical Area.

=== 2020 census ===
The 2020 United States census counted 400 people, 173 households, and 101 families in Gypsum. The population density was 1,069.5 per square mile (412.9/km^{2}). There were 188 housing units at an average density of 502.7 per square mile (194.1/km^{2}). The racial makeup was 86.75% (347) white or European American (85.75% non-Hispanic white), 5.75% (23) black or African-American, 0.0% (0) Native American or Alaska Native, 0.5% (2) Asian, 0.0% (0) Pacific Islander or Native Hawaiian, 0.75% (3) from other races, and 6.25% (25) from two or more races. Hispanic or Latino of any race was 3.25% (13) of the population.

Of the 173 households, 30.6% had children under the age of 18; 38.2% were married couples living together; 27.7% had a female householder with no spouse or partner present. 33.5% of households consisted of individuals and 16.8% had someone living alone who was 65 years of age or older. The average household size was 2.4 and the average family size was 2.9. The percent of those with a bachelor's degree or higher was estimated to be 10.2% of the population.

26.5% of the population was under the age of 18, 6.5% from 18 to 24, 24.5% from 25 to 44, 26.5% from 45 to 64, and 16.0% who were 65 years of age or older. The median age was 38.5 years. For every 100 females, there were 111.6 males. For every 100 females ages 18 and older, there were 107.0 males.

The 2016–2020 5-year American Community Survey estimates show that the median household income was $53,036 (with a margin of error of +/- $22,256) and the median family income was $66,875 (+/- $19,232). Males had a median income of $40,833 (+/- $12,432) versus $26,250 (+/- $8,925) for females. The median income for those above 16 years old was $31,620 (+/- $7,226). Approximately, 4.6% of families and 7.8% of the population were below the poverty line, including 8.7% of those under the age of 18 and 7.0% of those ages 65 or over.

=== 2010 census ===
As of the census of 2010, there were 405 people, 162 households, and 111 families residing in the city. The population density was 1,125.0 inhabitants per square mile (434.4/km^{2}). There were 187 housing units at an average density of 519.4 per square mile (200.5/km^{2}). The racial makeup of the city was 94.6% White, 0.5% African American, 1.2% Native American, 1.0% Asian, 1.0% from other races, and 1.7% from two or more races. Hispanic or Latino of any race were 2.5% of the population.

There were 162 households, of which 29.0% had children under the age of 18 living with them, 50.6% were married couples living together, 11.7% had a female householder with no husband present, 6.2% had a male householder with no wife present, and 31.5% were non-families. 27.2% of all households were made up of individuals, and 8.1% had someone living alone who was 65 years of age or older. The average household size was 2.50 and the average family size was 2.97.

The median age in the city was 39.9 years. 26.7% of residents were under the age of 18; 6.6% were between the ages of 18 and 24; 24.5% were from 25 to 44; 27.7% were from 45 to 64; and 14.6% were 65 years of age or older. The gender makeup of the city was 47.2% male and 52.8% female.

=== 2000 census ===
As of the census of 2000, there were 414 people, 158 households, and 111 families residing in the city. The population density was 956.5 inhabitants per square mile (369.3/km^{2}). There were 179 housing units at an average density of 413.6 per square mile (159.7/km^{2}). The racial makeup of the city was 95.17% White, 1.21% African American, 0.24% from other races, and 3.38% from two or more races. Hispanic or Latino of any race were 0.97% of the population.

There were 158 households, out of which 36.7% had children under the age of 18 living with them, 57.6% were married couples living together, 7.6% had a female householder with no husband present, and 29.7% were non-families. 25.3% of all households were made up of individuals, and 12.0% had someone living alone who was 65 years of age or older. The average household size was 2.62 and the average family size was 3.09.

In the city, the population was spread out, with 28.5% under the age of 18, 7.2% from 18 to 24, 29.7% from 25 to 44, 23.4% from 45 to 64, and 11.1% who were 65 years of age or older. The median age was 36 years. For every 100 females, there were 102.9 males. For every 100 females age 18 and over, there were 107.0 males.

The median income for a household in the city was $30,833, and the median income for a family was $34,375. Males had a median income of $27,000 versus $17,386 for females. The per capita income for the city was $16,440. About 4.1% of families and 6.0% of the population were below the poverty line, including 3.5% of those under age 18 and 9.4% of those age 65 or over.

== Government ==
The Gypsum government consists of a mayor and five council members. The council meets the 2nd Monday of each month at 7 pm.

== Education ==
The community is served by Southeast of Saline USD 306 public school district. The Southeast of Saline High School mascot is the Trojans.

Gypsum schools were closed through school unification. The Gypsum High School mascot was Pirates.

== Notable people ==
- Steve Fritz (b. 1967), fourth place in 1996 Olympic decathlon, assistant coach for the Kansas State University track and field team for 21 years.
- Bill Wheatley (1909–1992), basketball player who competed in the 1936 Summer Olympics with the American basketball team that won a gold medal.
- Frank Wilkeson (1848–1913), New York Times journalist and Washington explorer who owned a large ranch in Gypsum for nearly forty years.

== See also ==
- National Register of Historic Places listings in Saline County, Kansas
