= Southeast of Saline Secondary School =

High school in Kansas, United States

Coordinates: 38°42′33″N 97°30′36″W

Southeast of Saline Secondary School is a K-12 school, located approximately 4 miles west of Gypsum, Kansas, United States, on the south side of Highway K-4. It is operated by Southeast of Saline USD 306.

The school's enrollment is approximately 700 students from the communities of Gypsum, Assaria, Kipp, and Mentor. The school colors are purple and white and the mascot is the Trojan.

== See also ==
- List of high schools in Kansas
- List of unified school districts in Kansas
