= K-149 (Kansas highway) =

State highway in Kansas, U.S.

K-149
- K-149 highlighted in red

Route information
- Maintained by KDOT
- Length: 6.098 mi (9.814 km)
- Existed: February 13, 1957–present

Major junctions
- South end: US-56 east of Herington
- North end: K-4 south of White City

Location
- Country: United States
- State: Kansas
- Counties: Morris

Highway system
- Kansas State Highway System; Interstate; US; State; Spurs
← K-148	→ K-150

K-149 is a 6.098-mile-long (9.814 km) north–south state highway in the U.S. state of Kansas. Entirely within rural Morris County, K-149's southern terminus is at U.S. Route 56 (US-56) east of Herington and the northern terminus is at K-4 south of White City. The highway passes through grasslands characteristic of the Great Plains and is a two-lane road for its entire length.

K-149 was first designated as a state highway by the State Highway Commission of Kansas, now known as the Kansas Department of Transportation, on February 13, 1957. The highway's alignment has not changed since it was created.

== Route description ==
K-149's southern terminus is at US-56 west of Council Grove. Aside from a 1/10-mile (160 m) jog to the east near its midpoint due to a survey correction, the highway travels due north through the Great Plains. The roadway crosses the West Fork Neosho River and passes an abandoned schoolhouse before reaching its northern terminus at K-4 south of White City.

The Kansas Department of Transportation (KDOT) tracks the traffic levels on its highways, and in 2020, the agency determined that on average the traffic was 160 vehicles per day on K-149. The entire route is paved with partial design bituminous pavement.

== History ==
K-149 was first designated a state highway by the Kansas State Highway Commission (SHC), now known as KDOT, on February 13, 1957. On June 5, 1957, the SHC asked for bids to pave the entire length of the new K-149. In October 1957, the SHC placed a load limit of 8 short tons (7.1 long tons; 7,300 kg) per vehicle on the bridge over the West Fork Neosho River in accordance with new stricter federal regulations. In November 1977, SHC approved a five-year statewide highway construction program at an estimated cost of almost $596 million (equivalent to $2.4 billion in 2024 dollars). Included in the project were plans to rebuild the K-149 bridge over the West Fork Neosho River at an estimated cost of $180,000 (equivalent to $725,000 in 2024 dollars). In early February 1978, it was announced that the existing 30-by-28-foot (9.1 m × 8.5 m) bridge will be replaced with a 132.5-by-28-foot-long (40.4 m × 8.5 m) concrete slab bridge. In late February 1978, the Federal Highway Administration approved the design plans for the new bridge. On August 31, 1978, the SHC asked for bids to be submitted by September 21, for the replacement bridge as well as grading and planting on a short section by the bridge. The bridge was then replaced that next year. K-149's alignment has not changed since it was created.

== Major intersections ==
The entire route is in Morris County.

Location	mi	km	Destinations	Notes
	0.000	0.000	US-56 – Council Grove, Herington	Southern terminus
	6.098	9.814	K-4 – White City, Dwight, Herington	Northern terminus
1.000 mi = 1.609 km; 1.000 km = 0.621 mi
