= Latimer, Kansas =

City in Morris County, Kansas

- City
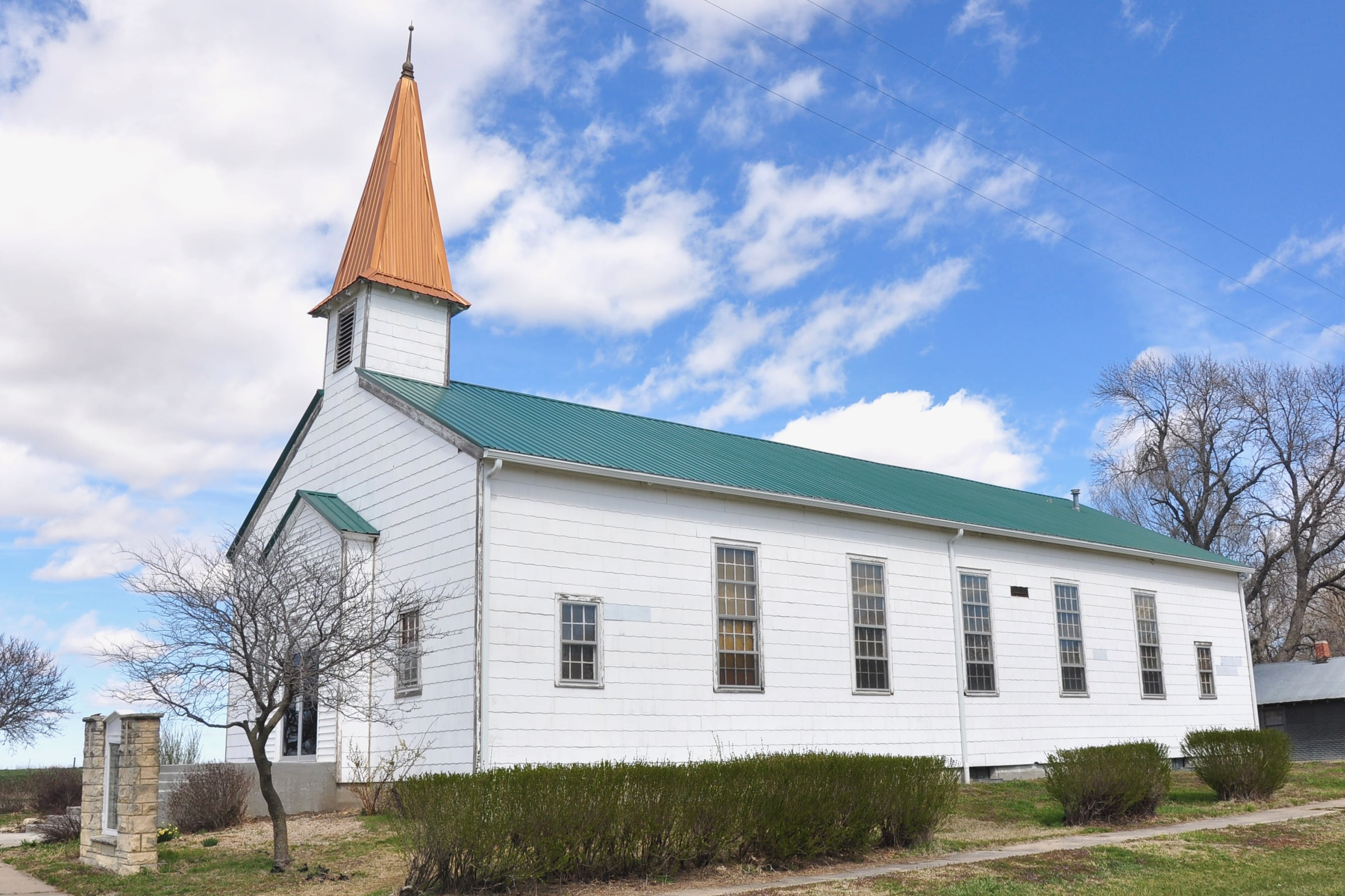
- Zion Lutheran Church

- Location within Morris County and Kansas

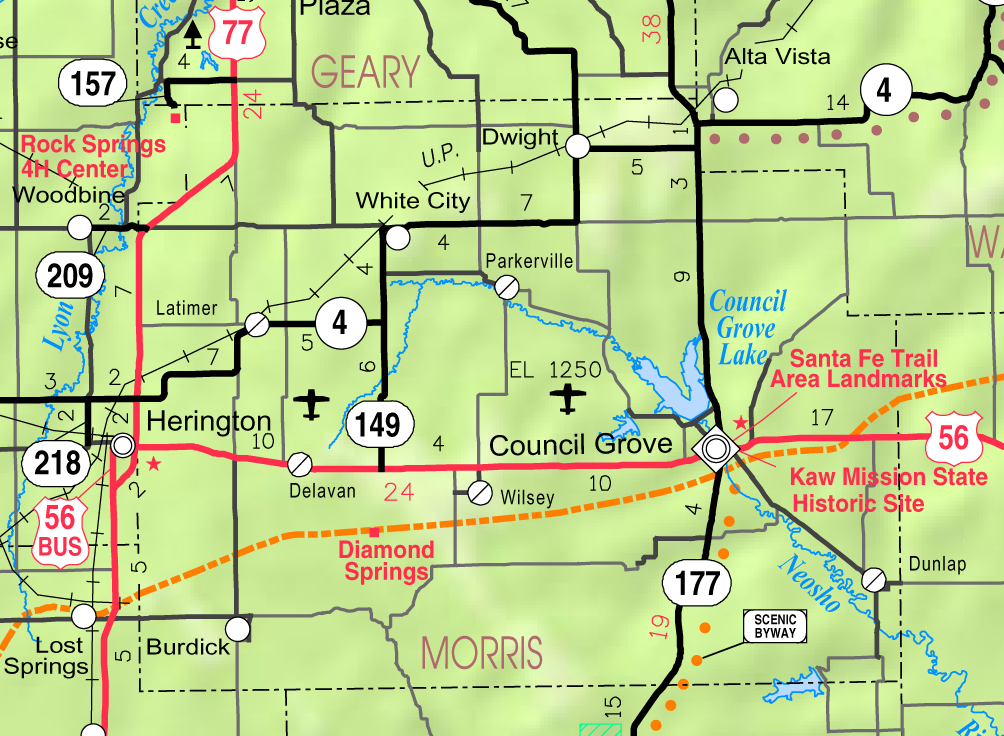
- KDOT map of Morris County (legend)
- Coordinates: 38°44′16″N 96°50′46″W
- Country: United States
- State: Kansas
- County: Morris
- Founded: 1883
- Incorporated: 1929

Government
  - Type: Mayor–Council

Area
  - Total: 0.058 sq mi (0.15 km^{2})
  - Land: 0.058 sq mi (0.15 km^{2})
  - Water: 0 sq mi (0.00 km^{2})
- Elevation: 1,414 ft (431 m)

Population (2020)
  - Total: 31
  - Density: 540/sq mi (210/km^{2})
- Time zone: UTC-6 (CST)
  - Summer (DST): UTC-5 (CDT)
- Area code: 785
- FIPS code: 20-38800
- GNIS ID: 477001

Latimer is a city in Morris County, Kansas, United States. As of the 2020 census, the population of the city was 31.

== History ==
The community was originally called Far West, and was founded in about 1883. It was renamed Latimer in 1888. Latimer was the name of one of the town's founders.

In 1887, the Chicago, Kansas and Nebraska Railway built a main line from Topeka through Latimer to Herington. The Chicago, Kansas and Nebraska Railway was foreclosed in 1891 and taken over by Chicago, Rock Island and Pacific Railway, which shut down in 1980 and reorganized as Oklahoma, Kansas and Texas Railroad, merged in 1988 with Missouri Pacific Railroad, and merged in 1997 with Union Pacific Railroad. Most locals still refer to this railroad as the "Rock Island".

The post office in Latimer was discontinued in 1961.

== Geography ==
Latimer is located at 38°44′16″N 96°50′46″W (38.737844, -96.846059). According to the United States Census Bureau, the city has a total area of 0.09 square miles (0.23 km^{2}), all land.

== Demographics ==
Historical population
Census	Pop.	Note	%±
1930	124		—
1940	84		−32.3%
1950	34		−59.5%
1960	40		17.6%
1970	29		−27.5%
1980	31		6.9%
1990	20		−35.5%
2000	21		5.0%
2010	20		−4.8%
2020	31		55.0%
U.S. Decennial Census

=== 2020 census ===
The 2020 United States census counted 31 people, 9 households, and 8 families in Latimer. The population density was 516.7 per square mile (199.5/km^{2}). There were 9 housing units at an average density of 150.0 per square mile (57.9/km^{2}). The racial makeup was 100.0% (31) white or European American (100.0% non-Hispanic white), 0.0% (0) black or African-American, 0.0% (0) Native American or Alaska Native, 0.0% (0) Asian, 0.0% (0) Pacific Islander or Native Hawaiian, 0.0% (0) from other races, and 0.0% (0) from two or more races. Hispanic or Latino of any race was 0.0% (0) of the population.

Of the 9 households, 55.6% had children under the age of 18; 77.8% were married couples living together; 11.1% had a female householder with no spouse or partner present. 11.1% of households consisted of individuals and 0.0% had someone living alone who was 65 years of age or older. The average household size was 2.0 and the average family size was 2.0.

32.3% of the population was under the age of 18, 6.5% from 18 to 24, 12.9% from 25 to 44, 35.5% from 45 to 64, and 12.9% who were 65 years of age or older. The median age was 37.8 years. For every 100 females, there were 47.6 males. For every 100 females ages 18 and older, there were 40.0 males.

=== 2010 census ===
As of the census of 2010, there were 20 people, 9 households, and 5 families residing in the city. The population density was 222.2 inhabitants per square mile (85.8/km^{2}). There were 11 housing units at an average density of 122.2 per square mile (47.2/km^{2}). The racial makeup of the city was 100.0% White.

There were 9 households, of which 33.3% had children under the age of 18 living with them, 55.6% were married couples living together, and 44.4% were non-families. 44.4% of all households were made up of individuals, and 11.1% had someone living alone who was 65 years of age or older. The average household size was 2.22 and the average family size was 3.20.

The median age in the city was 46 years. 25% of residents were under the age of 18; 5% were between the ages of 18 and 24; 15% were from 25 to 44; 40% were from 45 to 64; and 15% were 65 years of age or older. The gender makeup of the city was 50.0% male and 50.0% female.

=== 2000 census ===
As of the census of 2000, there were 21 people, 9 households, and 3 families residing in the city. The population density was 241.9 inhabitants per square mile (93.4/km^{2}). There were 13 housing units at an average density of 149.8 per square mile (57.8/km^{2}). The racial makeup of the city was 90.48% White and 9.52% Native American.

There were 9 households, out of which 22.2% had children under the age of 18 living with them, 44.4% were married couples living together, and 55.6% were non-families. 55.6% of all households were made up of individuals, and 33.3% had someone living alone who was 65 years of age or older. The average household size was 2.33 and the average family size was 3.75.

In the city, the population was spread out, with 9.5% under the age of 18, 14.3% from 18 to 24, 38.1% from 25 to 44, 9.5% from 45 to 64, and 28.6% who were 65 years of age or older. The median age was 42 years. For every 100 females, there were 90.9 males. For every 100 females age 18 and over, there were 90.0 males.

The median income for a household in the city was $21,875, and the median income for a family was $13,750. Males had a median income of $20,000 versus $0 for females. The per capita income for the city was $14,536. There were no families and 18.2% of the population living below the poverty line, including no under eighteens and 40.0% of those over 64.

== Education ==
The community is served by Rural Vista USD 481 public school district.
