= Morris County, Kansas =

County in Kansas, United States

- County
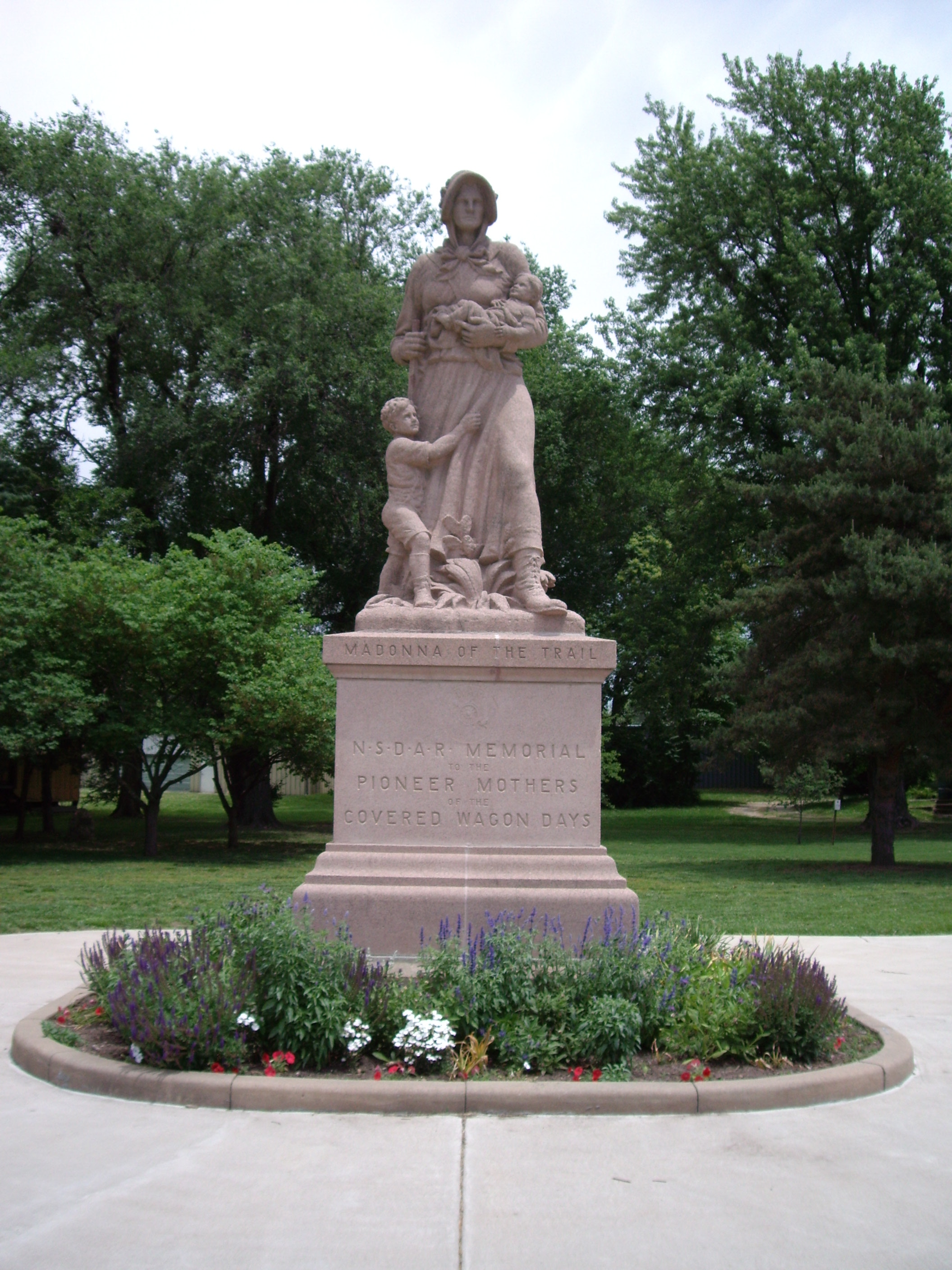
- Madonna of the Trail monument in Council Grove

- Location within the U.S. state of Kansas
- Coordinates: 38°42′N 96°36′W
- Country: United States
- State: Kansas
- Founded: February 11, 1859
- Named for: Thomas Morris
- Seat: Council Grove
- Largest city: Council Grove

Area
  - Total: 703 sq mi (1,820 km^{2})
  - Land: 695 sq mi (1,800 km^{2})
  - Water: 7.6 sq mi (20 km^{2}) 1.1%

Population (2020)
  - Total: 5,386
  - Estimate (2025): 5,348 ▼
  - Density: 7.7/sq mi (3.0/km^{2})
- Time zone: UTC−6 (Central)
  - Summer (DST): UTC−5 (CDT)
- Congressional district: 2nd
- Website: MorrisCountyKS.org

Morris County is a county located in the U.S. state of Kansas. Its county seat and largest city is Council Grove. As of the 2020 census, the county population was 5,386. The county was named for Thomas Morris, a U.S. Senator from Ohio and anti-slavery advocate.

== History ==
=== Early history ===
For many millennia, the Great Plains of North America was inhabited by nomadic Native Americans. From the 16th century to 18th century, the Kingdom of France claimed ownership of large parts of North America. In 1762, after the French and Indian War, France secretly ceded New France to Spain, per the Treaty of Fontainebleau. In 1802, Spain returned most of the land to France, but keeping title to about 7,500 square miles.

In 1803, most of the land for modern day Kansas was acquired by the United States from France as part of the 828,000 square mile Louisiana Purchase for 2.83 cents per acre. In 1848, after the Mexican–American War, the Treaty of Guadalupe Hidalgo with Mexico brought into the United States all or part of land for ten future states, including southwest Kansas. In 1854, the Kansas Territory was organized, then in 1861 Kansas became the 34th U.S. state.

=== 19th century ===
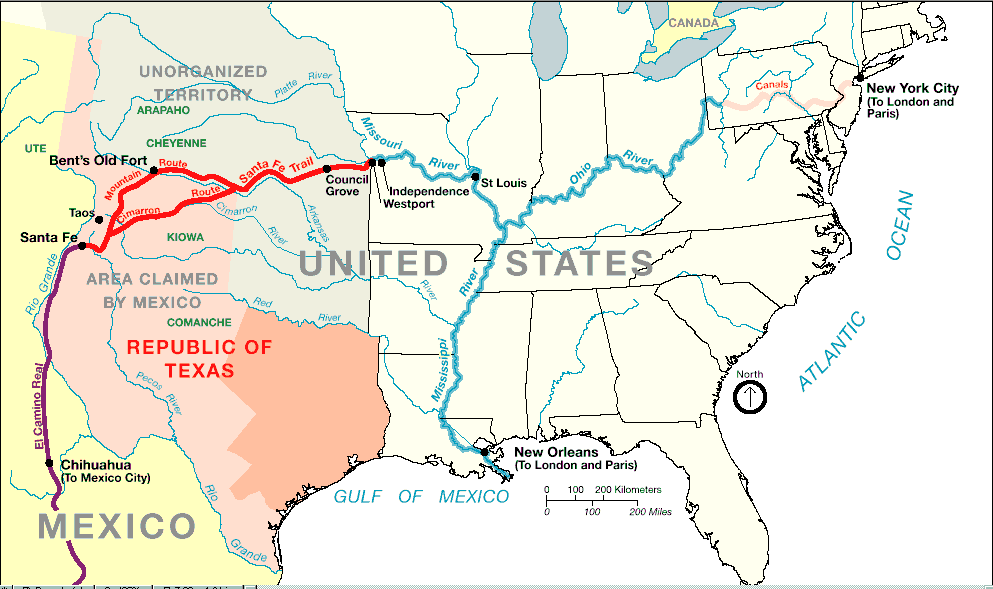
1845 Santa Fe Trail crossing Morris County

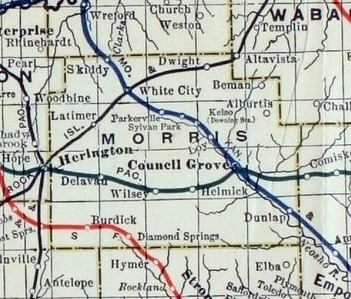
1915-1918 railroad map of Morris County

The county was established on ancient grounds of the Kaw American Indian tribe. Settlers and the Kaw lived in increasingly uneasy relationship as settlers encroached on native lands.

Council Grove, established by European Americans in 1825, was an important supply station on the Santa Fe Trail. The community was also the site of an encampment by John C. Fremont in 1845 and in 1849 the Overland Mail established a supply headquarters there.

From 1821 to 1866, the Santa Fe Trail was active across Morris County.

The county was originally organized as Wise County in 1855. The county was named for Virginia Governor Henry A. Wise. When Wise presided over the hanging of abolitionist John Brown at Harpers Ferry in 1859, abolition supporters renamed it to Morris County in honor of Thomas Morris, a former United States Senator from Ohio who was an opponent of slavery.

From 1846 to 1873, a Kaw Indian Reservation was centered around Council Grove, Kansas on 20 square miles of land. In 1851, the Methodist Church established an Indian Mission in Morris County.

Between 1877 and 1879, Benjamin "Pap" Singleton, a former slave who escaped to freedom in 1846, staked out a settlement in Morris County for freedmen known as "Exodusters". Thousands of families migrated from the post-Reconstruction South to seek more opportunities and better living conditions in the Midwest.

In 1887, the Chicago, Kansas and Nebraska Railway built a main line from Topeka to Herington. This main line connected Topeka, Valencia, Willard, Maple Hill, Vera, Paxico, McFarland, Alma, Volland, Alta Vista, Dwight, White City, Latimer, Herington. The Chicago, Kansas and Nebraska Railway was foreclosed in 1891 and taken over by Chicago, Rock Island and Pacific Railway, which shut down in 1980 and reorganized as Oklahoma, Kansas and Texas Railroad, merged in 1988 with Missouri Pacific Railroad, merged in 1997 with Union Pacific Railroad. Most locals still refer to this railroad as the "Rock Island".

In 1887, Atchison, Topeka and Santa Fe Railway built a branch line from Neva (three miles west of Strong City) to Superior, Nebraska. This branch line connected Strong City, Neva, Rockland, Diamond Springs, Burdick, Lost Springs, Jacobs, Hope, Navarre, Enterprise, Abilene, Talmage, Manchester, Longford, Oak Hill, Miltonvale, Aurora, Huscher, Concordia, Kackley, Courtland, Webber, Superior. At some point, the line from Neva to Lost Springs was pulled but the right of way has not been abandoned. This branch line was originally called "Strong City and Superior line" but later the name was shortened to the "Strong City line". In 1996, the Atchison, Topeka and Santa Fe Railway merged with Burlington Northern Railroad and renamed to the current BNSF Railway.

=== 20th century ===
The National Old Trails Road, also known as the Ocean-to-Ocean Highway, was established in 1912, and was routed through Herington, Delavan, and Council Grove.

During World War II, the federal government established the 1,700-acre Herington Army Airfield near Delavan in 1942 to process heavy bomber crews and B-29 Superfortress aircraft. Concurrently, an internment branch camp was erected at the former Civilian Conservation Corps (CCC) camp in Council Grove to house German prisoners of war (POWs) used as agricultural labor.

Following the catastrophic Great Flood of 1951, which heavily damaged the Neosho River valley, the federal government authorized construction of the Council Grove Dam and Reservoir under the Flood Control Act of 1950. Construction began in June 1960, cost $11.5 million, and became fully operational for regional flood control on October 9, 1964.

The historic Custer Elm tree in Council Grove—under which General George Armstrong Custer and the 7th Cavalry camped in 1867 while patrolling the Santa Fe Trail—died of Dutch elm disease in the mid-1970s, though its base trunk was preserved as a historical landmark.

=== 21st century ===
In April 2002, the Kaw Nation reclaimed a portion of their ancestral home by purchasing 168 acres of territory south of Council Grove to establish the Allegawaho Memorial Heritage Park. The park preserves the physical ruins of the 1861 Kaw Agency building, which marked the tribe's final reservation lands in Kansas prior to their forced removal to Indian Territory in 1873.

== Geography ==
According to the U.S. Census Bureau, the county has a total area of 703 square miles (1,820 km^{2}), of which 695 square miles (1,800 km^{2}) is land and 7.6 square miles (20 km^{2}) (1.1%) is water.

=== Adjacent counties ===
- Geary County (north)
- Wabaunsee County (northeast)
- Lyon County (southeast)
- Chase County (south)
- Marion County (southwest)
- Dickinson County (west)

== Demographics ==
Historical population
Census	Pop.	Note	%±
1860	770		—
1870	2,225		189.0%
1880	9,265		316.4%
1890	11,381		22.8%
1900	11,967		5.1%
1910	12,397		3.6%
1920	12,005		−3.2%
1930	11,859		−1.2%
1940	10,363		−12.6%
1950	8,485		−18.1%
1960	7,392		−12.9%
1970	6,432		−13.0%
1980	6,419		−0.2%
1990	6,198		−3.4%
2000	6,104		−1.5%
2010	5,923		−3.0%
2020	5,386		−9.1%
2025 (est.)	5,348	▼	−0.7%
U.S. Decennial Census; 1790-1960 1900-1990; 1990-2000 2010-2020

=== Racial and ethnic composition ===
Morris County, Kansas – Racial and ethnic composition Note: the US Census treats Hispanic/Latino as an ethnic category. This table excludes Latinos from the racial categories and assigns them to a separate category. Hispanics/Latinos may be of any race.
Race / Ethnicity (NH = Non-Hispanic)	Pop 1980	Pop 1990	Pop 2000	Pop 2010	Pop 2020	% 1980	% 1990	% 2000	% 2010	% 2020
White alone (NH)	6,305	6,050	5,871	5,572	4,897	98.22%	97.61%	96.18%	94.07%	90.92%
Black or African American alone (NH)	19	18	21	25	16	0.30%	0.29%	0.34%	0.42%	0.30%
Native American or Alaska Native alone (NH)	22	29	18	26	10	0.34%	0.47%	0.29%	0.44%	0.19%
Asian alone (NH)	8	11	12	14	18	0.12%	0.18%	0.20%	0.24%	0.33%
Native Hawaiian or Pacific Islander alone (NH)	x	x	1	1	1	x	x	0.02%	0.02%	0.02%
Other race alone (NH)	1	0	1	0	12	0.02%	0.00%	0.02%	0.00%	0.22%
Mixed race or Multiracial (NH)	x	x	44	73	205	x	x	0.72%	1.23%	3.81%
Hispanic or Latino (any race)	64	90	136	212	227	1.00%	1.45%	2.23%	3.58%	4.21%
Total	6,419	6,198	6,104	5,923	5,386	100.00%	100.00%	100.00%	100.00%	100.00%

=== 2020 census ===
As of the 2020 census, the county had a population of 5,386 and a median age of 47.2 years; 21.5% of residents were under the age of 18 and 24.6% were 65 years of age or older.

For every 100 females there were 97.9 males, and for every 100 females age 18 and over there were 96.1 males age 18 and over. 0.0% of residents lived in urban areas, while 100.0% lived in rural areas.

The racial makeup of the county was 92.6% White, 0.3% Black or African American, 0.3% American Indian and Alaska Native, 0.3% Asian, 0.0% Native Hawaiian and Pacific Islander, 1.2% from some other race, and 5.3% from two or more races. Hispanic or Latino residents of any race comprised 4.2% of the population.

There were 2,294 households in the county, of which 26.1% had children under the age of 18 living with them and 23.4% had a female householder with no spouse or partner present. About 30.1% of all households were made up of individuals and 14.9% had someone living alone who was 65 years of age or older.

There were 2,996 housing units, of which 23.4% were vacant. Among occupied housing units, 76.6% were owner-occupied and 23.4% were renter-occupied. The homeowner vacancy rate was 2.2% and the rental vacancy rate was 10.8%.

=== 2000 census ===
As of the census of 2000, there were 6,104 people, 2,539 households, and 1,777 families residing in the county. The population density was 9 people per square mile (3.5 people/km^{2}). There were 3,160 housing units at an average density of 4 per square mile (1.5/km^{2}). The racial makeup of the county was 97.49% White, 0.34% Black or African American, 0.33% Native American, 0.23% Asian, 0.02% Pacific Islander, 0.70% from other races, and 0.88% from two or more races. 2.23% of the population were Hispanic or Latino of any race.

There were 2,539 households, out of which 30.20% had children under the age of 18 living with them, 60.70% were married couples living together, 6.60% had a female householder with no husband present, and 30.00% were non-families. 28.00% of all households were made up of individuals, and 14.90% had someone living alone who was 65 years of age or older. The average household size was 2.37 and the average family size was 2.90.

In the county, the population was spread out, with 25.20% under the age of 18, 5.60% from 18 to 24, 23.90% from 25 to 44, 24.30% from 45 to 64, and 21.00% who were 65 years of age or older. The median age was 42 years. For every 100 females there were 97.00 males. For every 100 females age 18 and over, there were 93.30 males.

The median income for a household in the county was $32,163, and the median income for a family was $39,717. Males had a median income of $28,912 versus $21,239 for females. The per capita income for the county was $18,491. About 6.70% of families and 9.00% of the population were below the poverty line, including 10.40% of those under age 18 and 13.30% of those age 65 or over.

== Government ==
=== Presidential elections ===
Presidential election results

United States presidential election results for Morris County, Kansas
Year	Republican		Democratic		Third party(ies)	
Year	No.	%	No.	%	No.	%
1888	1,612	58.72%	840	30.60%	293	10.67%
1892	1,416	50.90%	0	0.00%	1,366	49.10%
1896	1,484	49.92%	1,456	48.97%	33	1.11%
1900	1,650	55.15%	1,326	44.32%	16	0.53%
1904	2,007	70.32%	702	24.60%	145	5.08%
1908	1,788	57.53%	1,273	40.96%	47	1.51%
1912	487	16.49%	1,144	38.73%	1,323	44.79%
1916	2,289	45.73%	2,577	51.48%	140	2.80%
1920	3,001	66.19%	1,467	32.36%	66	1.46%
1924	3,089	64.70%	1,040	21.78%	645	13.51%
1928	3,830	79.54%	929	19.29%	56	1.16%
1932	2,566	49.69%	2,452	47.48%	146	2.83%
1936	2,751	49.32%	2,805	50.29%	22	0.39%
1940	3,276	61.64%	1,992	37.48%	47	0.88%
1944	2,628	62.11%	1,584	37.44%	19	0.45%
1948	2,285	56.46%	1,701	42.03%	61	1.51%
1952	3,263	74.11%	1,124	25.53%	16	0.36%
1956	2,677	68.55%	1,208	30.93%	20	0.51%
1960	2,413	67.40%	1,148	32.07%	19	0.53%
1964	1,683	50.65%	1,605	48.30%	35	1.05%
1968	1,938	60.00%	976	30.22%	316	9.78%
1972	2,471	76.12%	704	21.69%	71	2.19%
1976	1,698	54.74%	1,337	43.10%	67	2.16%
1980	1,933	65.55%	810	27.47%	206	6.99%
1984	2,240	72.19%	820	26.43%	43	1.39%
1988	1,682	58.12%	1,165	40.26%	47	1.62%
1992	1,071	34.43%	957	30.76%	1,083	34.81%
1996	1,553	51.96%	965	32.29%	471	15.76%
2000	1,599	60.55%	882	33.40%	160	6.06%
2004	1,961	66.79%	931	31.71%	44	1.50%
2008	1,875	66.00%	907	31.93%	59	2.08%
2012	1,773	69.20%	718	28.02%	71	2.77%
2016	1,820	69.36%	601	22.90%	203	7.74%
2020	2,124	73.27%	729	25.15%	46	1.59%
2024	2,021	72.39%	721	25.82%	50	1.79%

Like all of Kansas outside the eastern cities, Morris County is powerfully Republican. Only two Democratic presidential candidates have ever carried the county – Woodrow Wilson in 1916 and Franklin D. Roosevelt in 1936, who ironically was opposing Kansan governor Alf Landon. Ross Perot tied with George H. W. Bush in the county in 1992.

=== Laws ===
Following amendment to the Kansas Constitution in 1986, the county remained a prohibition, or "dry", county until 1992, when voters approved the sale of alcoholic liquor by the individual drink with a 30 percent food sales requirement.

== Education ==
=== Unified school districts ===
School districts covering the county include:

- Morris County USD 417
- Rural Vista USD 481

School district office in neighboring county

- Centre USD 397
- Chase County USD 284
- Herington USD 487

== Communities ==
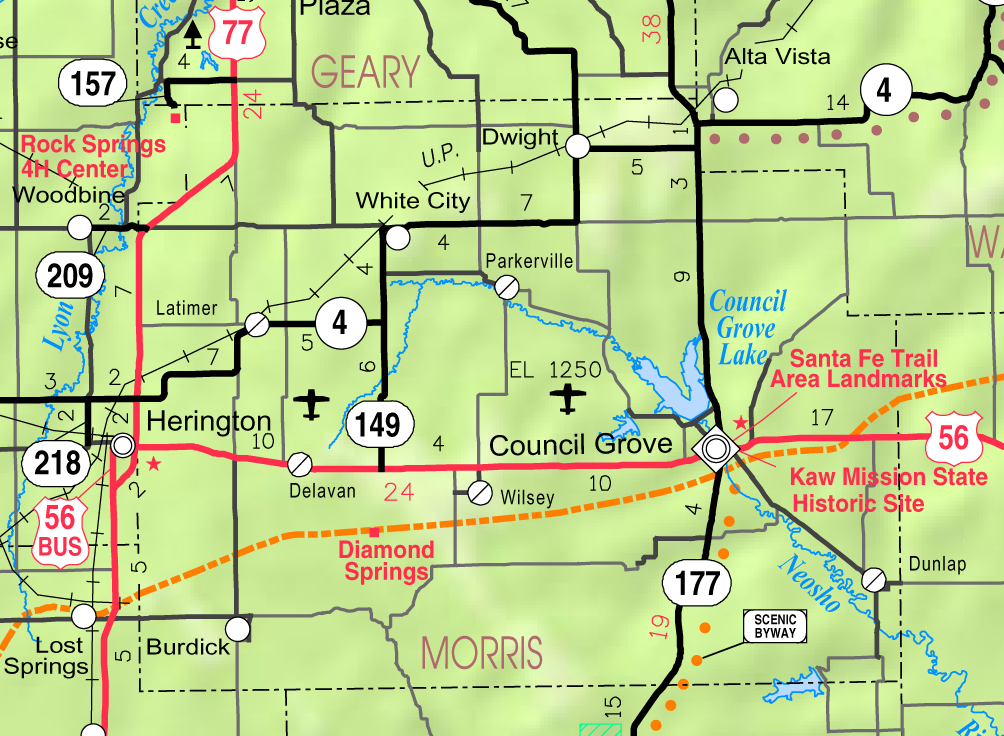
2005 map of Morris County (map legend)

List of townships / incorporated cities / unincorporated communities / extinct former communities within Morris County.

=== Cities ===
‡ means a community has portions in an adjacent county.

- Council Grove (county seat)
- Dunlap
- Dwight
- Herington‡
- Latimer
- Parkerville
- White City
- Wilsey

=== Unincorporated communities ===
† means a community is designated a Census-Designated Place (CDP) by the United States Census Bureau.

- Burdick†
- Delavan
- Diamond Springs
- Skiddy

=== Ghost towns ===
- Comiskey‡

=== Townships ===
Morris County is divided into eleven townships. The cities of Council Grove and Herington are considered governmentally independent and are excluded from the census figures for the townships. In the following table, the population center is the largest city (or cities) included in that township's population total, if it is of a significant size.

Sources: 2000 U.S. Gazetteer from the U.S. Census Bureau.
Township	FIPS	Population center	Population	Population density /km^{2} (/sq mi)	Land area km^{2} (sq mi)	Water area km^{2} (sq mi)	Water %	Geographic coordinates
Highland	31975		94	1 (3)	93 (36)	0 (0)	0.03%	38°44′48″N 96°45′52″W
Overland	53750		60	1 (2)	88 (34)	0 (0)	0.01%	38°48′18″N 96°51′44″W
Township 1	71202		551	2 (4)	356 (138)	1 (0)	0.28%	38°36′23″N 96°25′34″W
Township 2	71206		688	3 (7)	270 (104)	12 (5)	4.37%	38°42′42″N 96°30′4″W
Township 3	71210		503	5 (12)	109 (42)	0 (0)	0.06%	38°49′54″N 96°34′57″W
Township 4	71214		252	2 (4)	155 (60)	0 (0)	0.02%	38°47′19″N 96°39′17″W
Township 5	71218		686	7 (19)	93 (36)	0 (0)	0.02%	38°48′24″N 96°45′4″W
Township 6	71222		111	1 (4)	78 (30)	0 (0)	0.18%	38°44′5″N 96°51′46″W
Township 7	71227		258	2 (4)	170 (66)	0 (0)	0.10%	38°39′22″N 96°49′44″W
Township 8	71232		212	1 (3)	186 (72)	0 (0)	0.08%	38°33′56″N 96°48′36″W
Township 9	71237		368	2 (5)	202 (78)	0 (0)	0.08%	38°38′2″N 96°39′28″W

== See also ==
- Flint Hills Trail
- National Register of Historic Places listings in Morris County, Kansas

Community information for Kansas

- Kansas locations by per capita income
- List of counties in Kansas
- List of townships in Kansas
- List of cities in Kansas
- List of unincorporated communities in Kansas
- List of ghost towns in Kansas
