= White City, Kansas =

City in Morris County, Kansas

- City
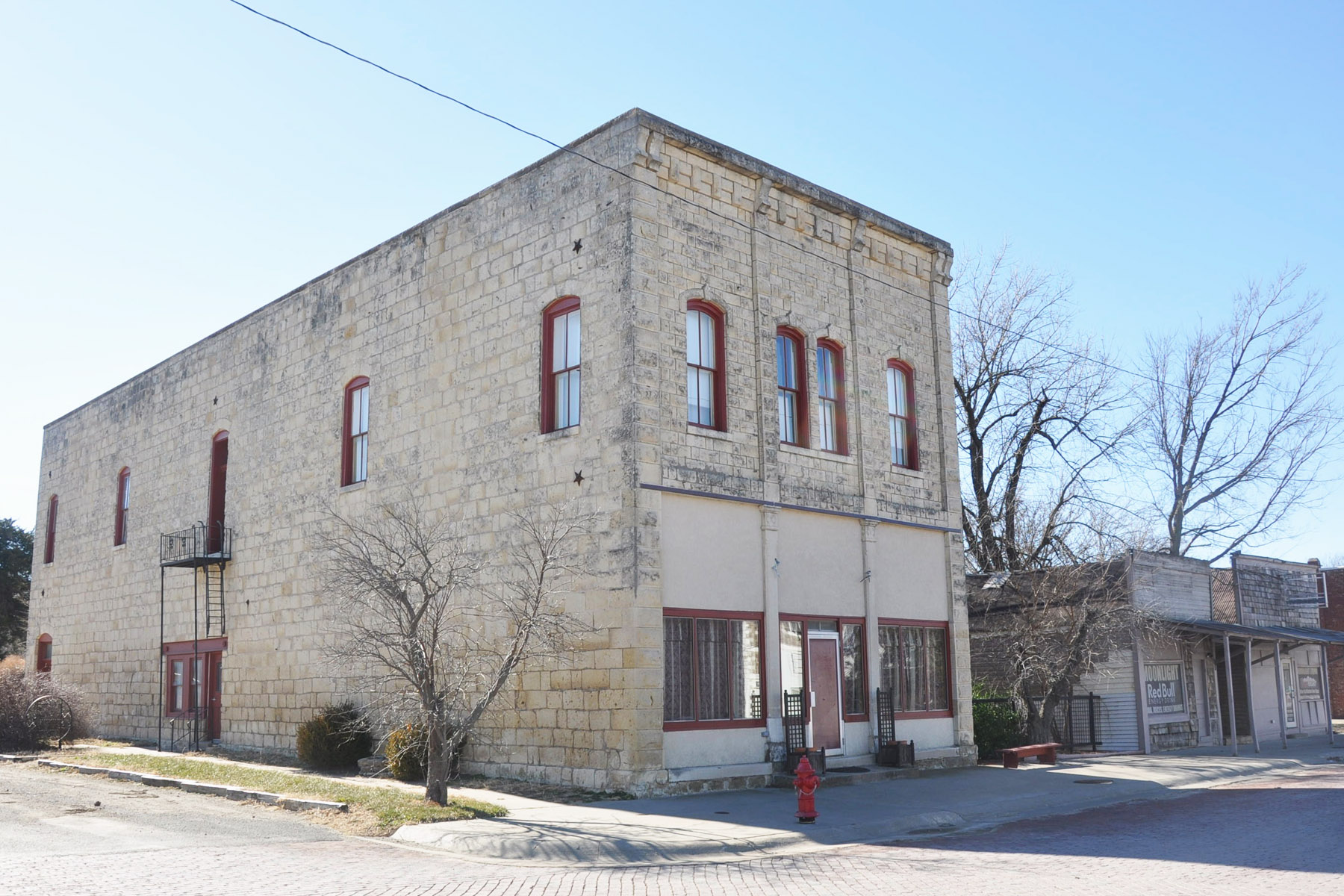
- Jenkins Building (2021)

- Location within Morris County and Kansas

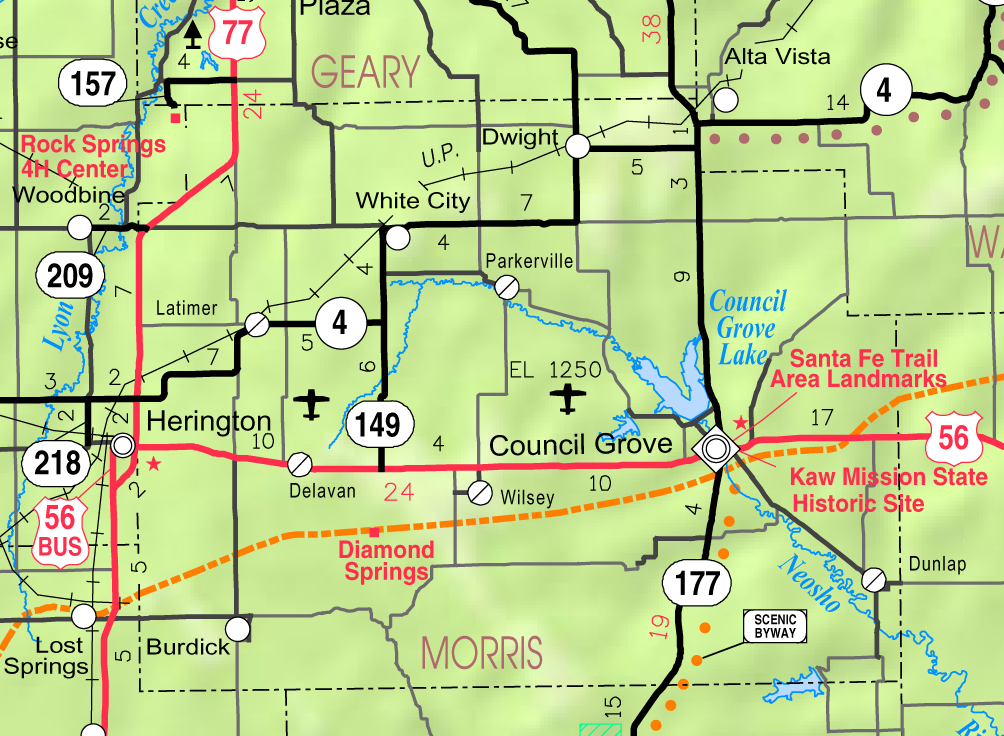
- KDOT map of Morris County (legend)
- Coordinates: 38°47′43″N 96°44′12″W
- Country: United States
- State: Kansas
- County: Morris
- Founded: 1871
- Incorporated: 1885
- Named for: F.C. White

Government
  - Type: Mayor–Council

Area
  - Total: 1.25 sq mi (3.23 km^{2})
  - Land: 1.24 sq mi (3.22 km^{2})
  - Water: 0.0039 sq mi (0.01 km^{2})
- Elevation: 1,473 ft (449 m)

Population (2020)
  - Total: 447
  - Density: 360/sq mi (139/km^{2})
- Time zone: UTC-6 (CST)
  - Summer (DST): UTC-5 (CDT)
- ZIP Code: 66872
- Area code: 785
- FIPS code: 20-77825
- GNIS ID: 476888
- Website: whitecityks.net

White City is a city in Morris County, Kansas, United States. As of the 2020 census, the population of the city was 447.

== History ==
White City was founded in 1871 by a colony from Chicago. It was named for F.C. White, superintendent of the Neosho division of the M-K-T Railroad, which was built on the land in 1868, prior to the existence of the community. Prior to the naming of the community, other names considered were "New Chicago" (because the founders came from Chicago) and "Swedeland" (because so many Swedes settled in the community).

The first post office in White City was established in January 1872.

In 1887, the Chicago, Kansas and Nebraska Railway built a main line from Topeka through White City to Herington. The Chicago, Kansas and Nebraska Railway was foreclosed in 1891 and taken over by Chicago, Rock Island and Pacific Railway, which shut down in 1980 and reorganized as Oklahoma, Kansas and Texas Railroad, merged in 1988 with Missouri Pacific Railroad, merged in 1997 with Union Pacific Railroad. Most locals still refer to this railroad as the "Rock Island".

== Geography ==
White City is located at 38°47′43″N 96°44′12″W (38.795216, -96.736657). According to the United States Census Bureau, the city has a total area of 1.26 square miles (3.26 km^{2}), of which 1.25 square miles (3.24 km^{2}) is land and 0.01 square miles (0.03 km^{2}) is water.

=== Climate ===
The climate in this area is characterized by hot, humid summers and generally mild to cool winters. According to the Köppen Climate Classification system, White City has a humid subtropical climate, abbreviated "Cfa" on climate maps.

== Demographics ==
Historical population
Census	Pop.	Note	%±
1880	158		—
1890	391		147.5%
1900	532		36.1%
1910	506		−4.9%
1920	652		28.9%
1930	619		−5.1%
1940	516		−16.6%
1950	540		4.7%
1960	459		−15.0%
1970	438		−4.6%
1980	534		21.9%
1990	533		−0.2%
2000	518		−2.8%
2010	618		19.3%
2020	447		−27.7%
U.S. Decennial Census

=== 2010 census ===
As of the census of 2010, there were 618 people, 238 households, and 169 families residing in the city. The population density was 494.4 inhabitants per square mile (190.9/km^{2}). There were 279 housing units at an average density of 223.2 per square mile (86.2/km^{2}). The racial makeup of the city was 95.3% White, 0.8% African American, 1.1% Native American, 0.3% Asian, 1.3% from other races, and 1.1% from two or more races. Hispanic or Latino of any race were 2.1% of the population.

There were 238 households, of which 34.0% had children under the age of 18 living with them, 55.5% were married couples living together, 10.5% had a female householder with no husband present, 5.0% had a male householder with no wife present, and 29.0% were non-families. 25.2% of all households were made up of individuals, and 13.4% had someone living alone who was 65 years of age or older. The average household size was 2.60 and the average family size was 3.05.

The median age in the city was 39.2 years. 26.4% of residents were under the age of 18; 8.1% were between the ages of 18 and 24; 23.6% were from 25 to 44; 27.3% were from 45 to 64; and 14.6% were 65 years of age or older. The gender makeup of the city was 50.8% male and 49.2% female.

=== 2000 census ===
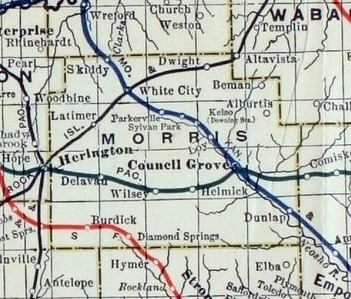
1915 railroad map of Morris County

As of the census of 2000, there were 518 people, 218 households, and 149 families residing in the city. The population density was 416.3 inhabitants per square mile (160.7/km^{2}). There were 253 housing units at an average density of 203.3 per square mile (78.5/km^{2}). The racial makeup of the city was 95.37% White, 0.77% African American, 0.19% Native American, 0.19% Asian, 1.16% from other races, and 2.32% from two or more races. Hispanic or Latino of any race were 2.32% of the population.

There were 218 households, out of which 34.4% had children under the age of 18 living with them, 56.4% were married couples living together, 9.2% had a female householder with no husband present, and 31.2% were non-families. 27.5% of all households were made up of individuals, and 15.1% had someone living alone who was 65 years of age or older. The average household size was 2.38 and the average family size was 2.91.

In the city, the population was spread out, with 26.8% under the age of 18, 6.4% from 18 to 24, 28.2% from 25 to 44, 21.8% from 45 to 64, and 16.8% who were 65 years of age or older. The median age was 37 years. For every 100 females, there were 97.0 males. For every 100 females age 18 and over, there were 101.6 males.

The median income for a household in the city was $36,136, and the median income for a family was $39,423. Males had a median income of $29,000 versus $18,000 for females. The per capita income for the city was $14,603. About 5.7% of families and 7.2% of the population were below the poverty line, including 8.8% of those under age 18 and 7.5% of those age 65 or over.

== Transportation ==
White City is connected to the Union Pacific rail system.

== Education ==
The community is served by Rural Vista USD 481 public school district. The community is served by a pre-kindergarten through grade 12 school with a mascot of Huskies. In most sports, however, the school consolidates with Hope High School to become the Rural Vista Heat.
