= Dwight, Kansas =

City in Morris County, Kansas

- City
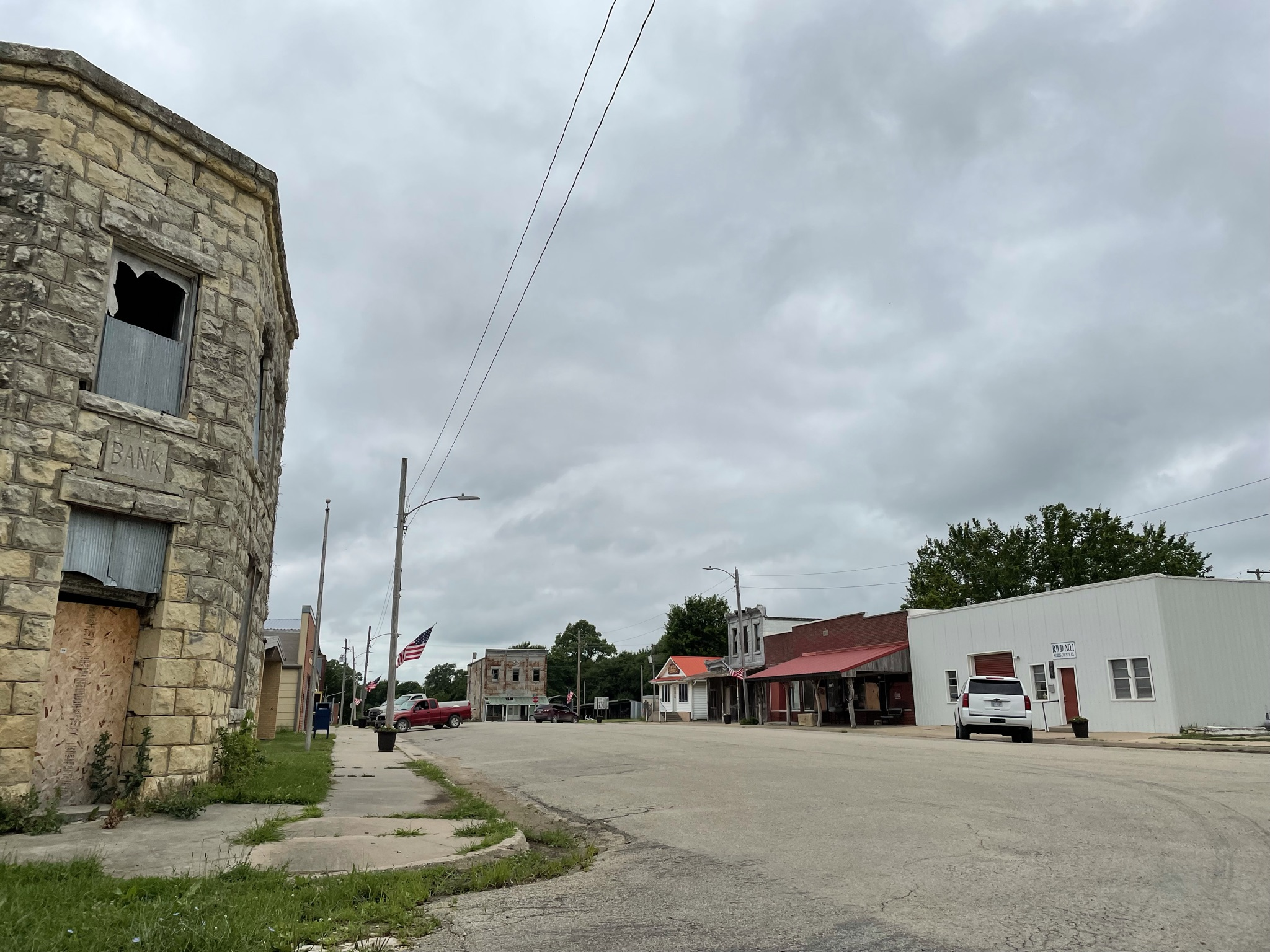
- Downtown area (2021)

- Location within Morris County and Kansas

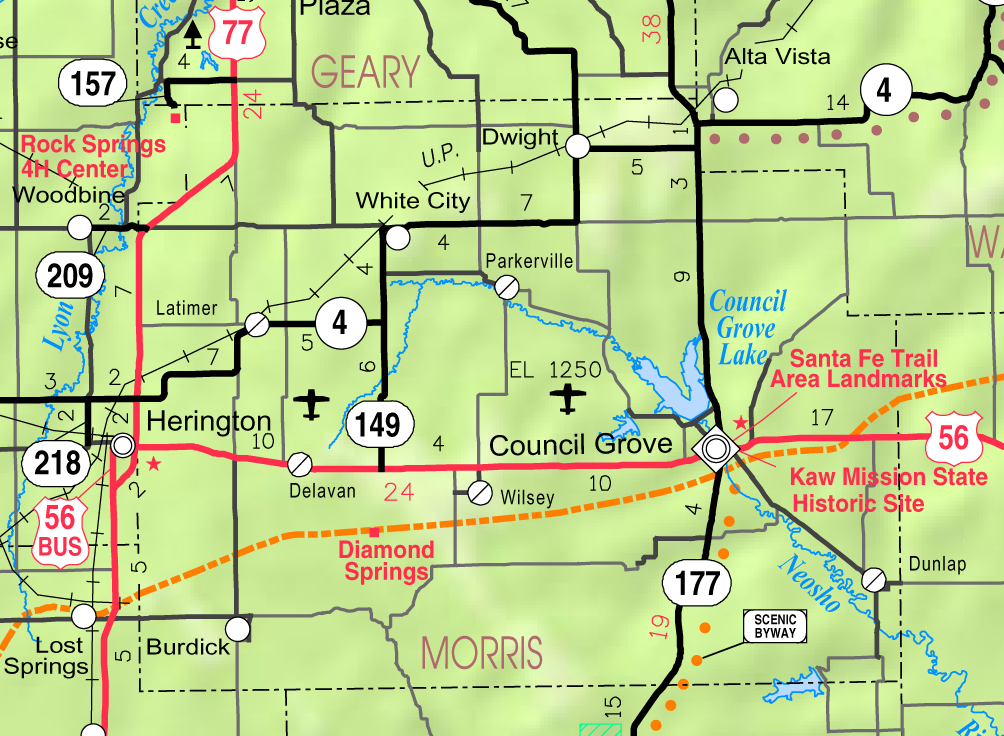
- KDOT map of Morris County (legend)
- Coordinates: 38°50′41″N 96°35′42″W
- Country: United States
- State: Kansas
- County: Morris
- Founded: 1887
- Incorporated: 1905
- Named for: Dwight Rathbone

Government
  - Type: Mayor–Council

Area
  - Total: 0.36 sq mi (0.94 km^{2})
  - Land: 0.36 sq mi (0.94 km^{2})
  - Water: 0 sq mi (0.00 km^{2})
- Elevation: 1,503 ft (458 m)

Population (2020)
  - Total: 217
  - Density: 600/sq mi (230/km^{2})
- Time zone: UTC-6 (CST)
  - Summer (DST): UTC-5 (CDT)
- ZIP Code: 66849
- Area code: 785
- FIPS code: 20-19125
- GNIS ID: 485452
- Website: dwightks.net

Dwight is a city in Morris County, Kansas, United States. As of the 2020 census, the population of the city was 217.

== History ==
Dwight had its start in the year 1887 by the building of the Chicago, Kansas and Nebraska Railway through that territory. It was named for Dwight Rathbone, the owner of the original town site. Dwight was incorporated as a city in 1903.

The Chicago, Kansas and Nebraska Railway was foreclosed in 1891 and taken over by Chicago, Rock Island and Pacific Railway, which shut down in 1980 and reorganized as Oklahoma, Kansas and Texas Railroad, merged in 1988 with Missouri Pacific Railroad, merged in 1997 with Union Pacific Railroad. Most locals still refer to this railroad as the "Rock Island".

A post office was established in Dwight on March 19, 1887.

== Geography ==
Dwight is located at 38°50′41″N 96°35′42″W (38.844602, -96.594935). According to the United States Census Bureau, the city has a total area of 0.37 square miles (0.96 km^{2}), all land.

== Demographics ==
Historical population
Census	Pop.	Note	%±
1910	298		—
1920	246		−17.4%
1930	334		35.8%
1940	295		−11.7%
1950	281		−4.7%
1960	281		0.0%
1970	322		14.6%
1980	320		−0.6%
1990	365		14.1%
2000	330		−9.6%
2010	272		−17.6%
2020	217		−20.2%
U.S. Decennial Census

=== 2020 census ===
The 2020 United States census counted 217 people, 90 households, and 59 families in Dwight. The population density was 601.1 per square mile (232.1/km^{2}). There were 113 housing units at an average density of 313.0 per square mile (120.9/km^{2}). The racial makeup was 82.95% (180) white or European American (82.95% non-Hispanic white), 1.38% (3) black or African-American, 0.0% (0) Native American or Alaska Native, 0.46% (1) Asian, 0.0% (0) Pacific Islander or Native Hawaiian, 0.0% (0) from other races, and 15.21% (33) from two or more races. Hispanic or Latino of any race was 0.92% (2) of the population.

Of the 90 households, 26.7% had children under the age of 18; 55.6% were married couples living together; 27.8% had a female householder with no spouse or partner present. 33.3% of households consisted of individuals and 17.8% had someone living alone who was 65 years of age or older. The average household size was 2.5 and the average family size was 3.1. The percent of those with a bachelor's degree or higher was estimated to be 23.5% of the population.

20.7% of the population was under the age of 18, 6.5% from 18 to 24, 17.5% from 25 to 44, 35.0% from 45 to 64, and 20.3% who were 65 years of age or older. The median age was 49.3 years. For every 100 females, there were 100.9 males. For every 100 females ages 18 and older, there were 102.4 males.

The 2016–2020 5-year American Community Survey estimates show that the median household income was $45,536 (with a margin of error of +/- $15,927) and the median family income was $68,750 (+/- $19,136). Males had a median income of $38,750 (+/- $22,837) versus $15,750 (+/- $5,715) for females. The median income for those above 16 years old was $32,321 (+/- $5,152). Approximately, 8.5% of families and 10.9% of the population were below the poverty line, including 7.7% of those under the age of 18 and 10.9% of those ages 65 or over.

=== 2010 census ===
As of the census of 2010, there were 272 people, 117 households, and 79 families residing in the city. The population density was 735.1 inhabitants per square mile (283.8/km^{2}). There were 136 housing units at an average density of 367.6 per square mile (141.9/km^{2}). The racial makeup of the city was 93.0% White, 1.5% African American, 0.4% Native American, 0.7% Asian, 0.4% from other races, and 4.0% from two or more races. Hispanic or Latino of any race were 4.8% of the population.

There were 117 households, of which 27.4% had children under the age of 18 living with them, 50.4% were married couples living together, 10.3% had a female householder with no husband present, 6.8% had a male householder with no wife present, and 32.5% were non-families. 28.2% of all households were made up of individuals, and 18.8% had someone living alone who was 65 years of age or older. The average household size was 2.32 and the average family size was 2.78.

The median age in the city was 45.1 years. 21.3% of residents were under the age of 18; 10% were between the ages of 18 and 24; 18.3% were from 25 to 44; 27.3% were from 45 to 64; and 23.2% were 65 years of age or older. The gender makeup of the city was 50.4% male and 49.6% female.

=== 2000 census ===
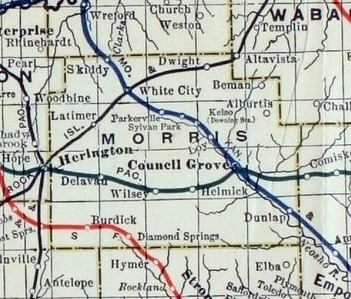
1915 railroad map of Morris County

As of the census of 2000, there were 330 people, 143 households, and 90 families residing in the city. The population density was 886.8 inhabitants per square mile (342.4/km^{2}). There were 163 housing units at an average density of 438.0 per square mile (169.1/km^{2}). The racial makeup of the city was 94.85% White, 0.30% African American, 0.61% Native American, 0.61% Asian, 1.52% from other races, and 2.12% from two or more races. Hispanic or Latino of any race were 4.85% of the population.

There were 143 households, out of which 29.4% had children under the age of 18 living with them, 53.1% were married couples living together, 6.3% had a female householder with no husband present, and 36.4% were non-families. 33.6% of all households were made up of individuals, and 14.7% had someone living alone who was 65 years of age or older. The average household size was 2.31 and the average family size was 2.96.

In the city, the population was spread out, with 24.2% under the age of 18, 9.1% from 18 to 24, 26.4% from 25 to 44, 23.0% from 45 to 64, and 17.3% who were 65 years of age or older. The median age was 39 years. For every 100 females, there were 100.0 males. For every 100 females age 18 and over, there were 96.9 males.

The median income for a household in the city was $25,909, and the median income for a family was $38,750. Males had a median income of $25,000 versus $20,227 for females. The per capita income for the city was $14,727. About 9.4% of families and 15.1% of the population were below the poverty line, including 17.7% of those under age 18 and 3.3% of those age 65 or over.

== Government ==
The Dwight government consists of a mayor and five council members. The council meets the 3rd Monday of each month at 7PM.

== Education ==
The community is served by Morris County USD 417 public school district. The district high school is Council Grove High School.

Dwight schools were closed through school unification. The Dwight Rockets won the Kansas State High School boys class BB basketball championship in 1966 and 1967.

== Notable people ==
- Mary Beck Briscoe, senior United States circuit judge of the United States Court of Appeals for the Tenth Circuit, grew up in Dwight and graduated from Dwight Rural High School with the class of 1965.
