= Alta Vista, Kansas =

City in Wabaunsee County, Kansas

- City
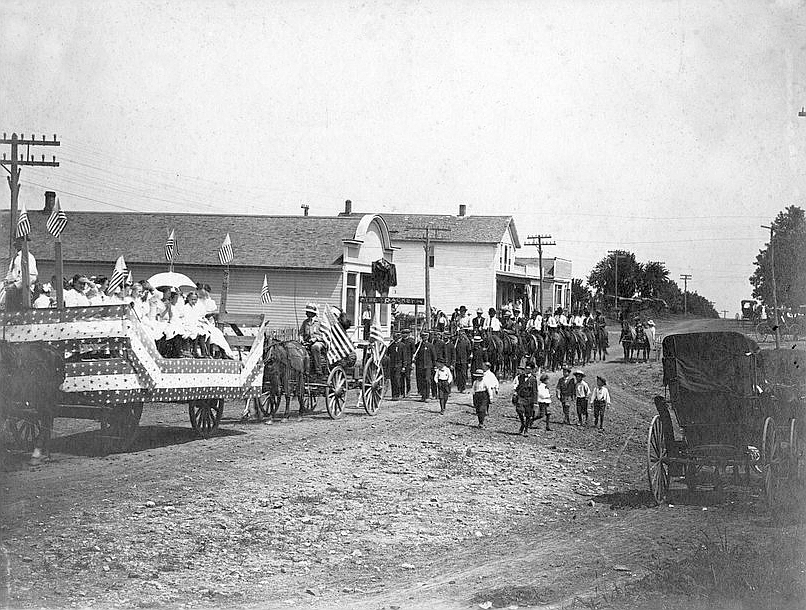
- Fourth of July Parade (1905)

- Location within Wabaunsee County and Kansas

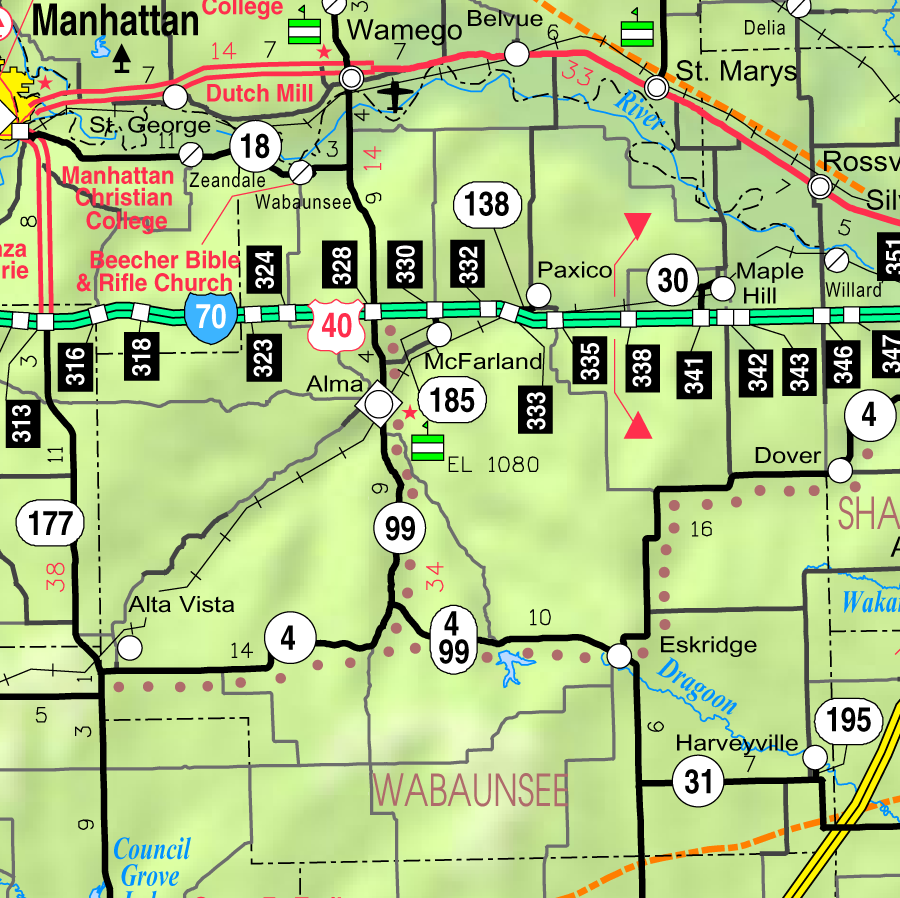
- KDOT map of Wabaunsee County (legend)
- Coordinates: 38°51′47″N 96°29′20″W
- Country: United States
- State: Kansas
- County: Wabaunsee
- Founded: 1887
- Incorporated: 1905

Government
  - Type: Mayor–Council

Area
  - Total: 0.35 sq mi (0.90 km^{2})
  - Land: 0.35 sq mi (0.90 km^{2})
  - Water: 0 sq mi (0.00 km^{2})
- Elevation: 1,453 ft (443 m)

Population (2020)
  - Total: 409
  - Density: 1,200/sq mi (450/km^{2})
- Time zone: UTC-6 (CST)
  - Summer (DST): UTC-5 (CDT)
- ZIP Code: 66834
- Area code: 785
- FIPS code: 20-01575
- GNIS ID: 2393931
- Website: altavistaks.com

Alta Vista is a city in Wabaunsee County, Kansas, United States. As of the 2020 census, the population of the city was 409.

== History ==
Alta Vista was founded in 1887, and it was incorporated as a city in 1905. Alta Vista is derived from the Spanish word for "high view", and the city was so named from its lofty elevation.

In 1887, the Chicago, Kansas and Nebraska Railway built a main line from Topeka through Alta Vista to Herington. The Chicago, Kansas and Nebraska Railway was foreclosed in 1891 and taken over by Chicago, Rock Island and Pacific Railway, which shut down in 1980 and reorganized as Oklahoma, Kansas and Texas Railroad, merged in 1988 with Missouri Pacific Railroad, merged in 1997 with Union Pacific Railroad. Most locals still refer to this railroad as the "Rock Island".

The first post office in Alta Vista was established in March 1887.

== Geography ==
According to the United States Census Bureau, the city has a total area of 0.36 square miles (0.93 km^{2}), all land.

=== Climate ===
The climate in this area is characterized by hot, humid summers and generally mild to cool winters. According to the Köppen Climate Classification system, Alta Vista has a humid subtropical climate, abbreviated "Cfa" on climate maps.

== Demographics ==
Historical population
Census	Pop.	Note	%±
1910	499		—
1920	484		−3.0%
1930	436		−9.9%
1940	461		5.7%
1950	420		−8.9%
1960	400		−4.8%
1970	402		0.5%
1980	430		7.0%
1990	477		10.9%
2000	442		−7.3%
2010	444		0.5%
2020	409		−7.9%
U.S. Decennial Census

Alta Vista is part of the Topeka, Kansas Metropolitan Statistical Area.

=== 2020 census ===
The 2020 United States census counted 409 people, 182 households, and 116 families in Alta Vista. The population density was 1,171.9 per square mile (452.5/km^{2}). There were 202 housing units at an average density of 578.8 per square mile (223.5/km^{2}). The racial makeup was 92.91% (380) white or European American (90.71% non-Hispanic white), 0.73% (3) black or African-American, 1.22% (5) Native American or Alaska Native, 0.0% (0) Asian, 0.0% (0) Pacific Islander or Native Hawaiian, 1.47% (6) from other races, and 3.67% (15) from two or more races. Hispanic or Latino of any race was 4.4% (18) of the population.

Of the 182 households, 28.0% had children under the age of 18; 51.6% were married couples living together; 23.6% had a female householder with no spouse or partner present. 30.8% of households consisted of individuals and 15.4% had someone living alone who was 65 years of age or older. The average household size was 2.1 and the average family size was 2.6. The percent of those with a bachelor's degree or higher was estimated to be 8.3% of the population.

23.5% of the population was under the age of 18, 7.8% from 18 to 24, 25.2% from 25 to 44, 23.0% from 45 to 64, and 20.5% who were 65 years of age or older. The median age was 37.9 years. For every 100 females, there were 98.5 males. For every 100 females ages 18 and older, there were 104.6 males.

The 2016–2020 5-year American Community Survey estimates show that the median household income was $39,205 (with a margin of error of +/- $6,168) and the median family income was $48,750 (+/- $23,089). Males had a median income of $31,442 (+/- $6,656) versus $30,417 (+/- $8,760) for females. The median income for those above 16 years old was $31,023 (+/- $5,440). Approximately, 12.3% of families and 23.8% of the population were below the poverty line, including 38.1% of those under the age of 18 and 21.3% of those ages 65 or over.

=== 2010 census ===
As of the census of 2010, there were 444 people, 189 households, and 128 families residing in the city. The population density was 1,233.3 inhabitants per square mile (476.2/km^{2}). There were 211 housing units at an average density of 586.1 per square mile (226.3/km^{2}). The racial makeup of the city was 98.2% White, 0.7% African American, 0.2% Native American, 0.2% Asian, and 0.7% from two or more races. Hispanic or Latino of any race were 4.3% of the population.

There were 189 households, of which 32.3% had children under the age of 18 living with them, 51.9% were married couples living together, 10.6% had a female householder with no husband present, 5.3% had a male householder with no wife present, and 32.3% were non-families. 28.6% of all households were made up of individuals, and 10.5% had someone living alone who was 65 years of age or older. The average household size was 2.35 and the average family size was 2.80.

The median age in the city was 41.5 years. 25% of residents were under the age of 18; 5.5% were between the ages of 18 and 24; 24.4% were from 25 to 44; 29.7% were from 45 to 64; and 15.5% were 65 years of age or older. The gender makeup of the city was 52.3% male and 47.7% female.

=== 2000 census ===
As of the census of 2000, there were 442 people, 190 households, and 126 families residing in the city. The population density was 1,242.1 inhabitants per square mile (479.6/km^{2}). There were 216 housing units at an average density of 607.0 per square mile (234.4/km^{2}). The racial makeup of the city was 97.29% White, 1.36% Native American, 0.68% Pacific Islander, and 0.68% from two or more races. Hispanic or Latino of any race were 4.07% of the population.

There were 190 households, out of which 30.0% had children under the age of 18 living with them, 52.1% were married couples living together, 10.5% had a female householder with no husband present, and 33.2% were non-families. 31.1% of all households were made up of individuals, and 16.8% had someone living alone who was 65 years of age or older. The average household size was 2.33 and the average family size was 2.90.

In the city, the population was spread out, with 24.0% under the age of 18, 7.7% from 18 to 24, 25.3% from 25 to 44, 27.4% from 45 to 64, and 15.6% who were 65 years of age or older. The median age was 41 years. For every 100 females, there were 113.5 males. For every 100 females age 18 and over, there were 103.6 males.

The median income for a household in the city was $32,159, and the median income for a family was $38,542. Males had a median income of $29,167 versus $20,833 for females. The per capita income for the city was $15,885. About 8.0% of families and 9.9% of the population were below the poverty line, including 15.5% of those under age 18 and 11.4% of those age 65 or over.

== Education ==
The community is served by Morris County USD 417 public school district.

Alta Vista High School was closed through school unification. The Alta Vista High School mascot was Bulldogs.

== Infrastructure ==
=== Transportation ===
Alta Vista is served by the Union Pacific Railroad, formerly the Southern Pacific, and prior, the Chicago, Rock Island and Pacific Railroad. Alta Vista is located on UP's Golden State main line to El Paso, Texas. The line was originally built by the Chicago, Kansas and Nebraska Railroad.
