= K149 =

K149 or K-149 may refer to:

- K-149 (Kansas highway), a state highway in Kansas
- HMCS Brandon (K149), a former Canadian Navy ship
