= Wilsey, Kansas =

City in Morris County, Kansas

- City
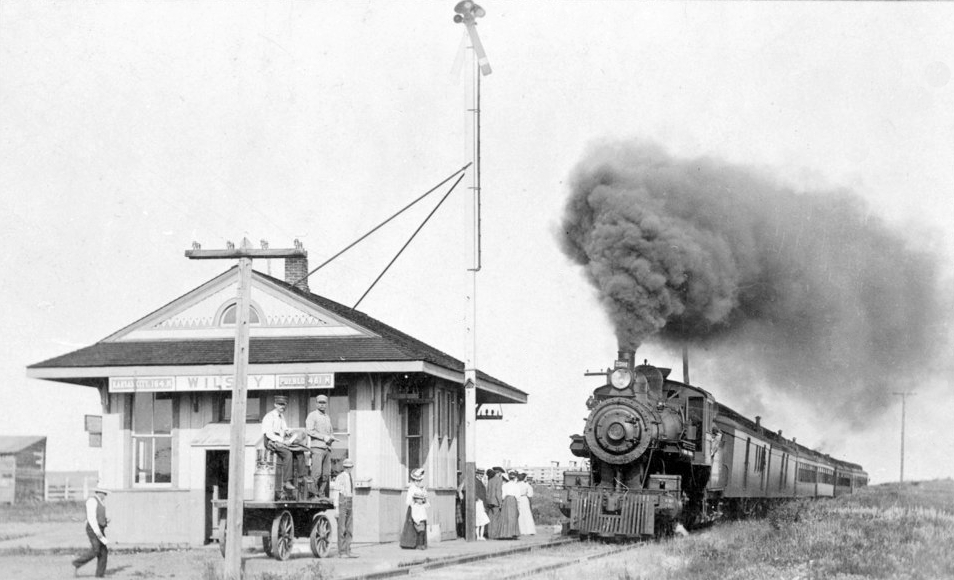
- Missouri Pacific Railroad depot in Wilsey, circa 1900–1919

- Location within Morris County and Kansas

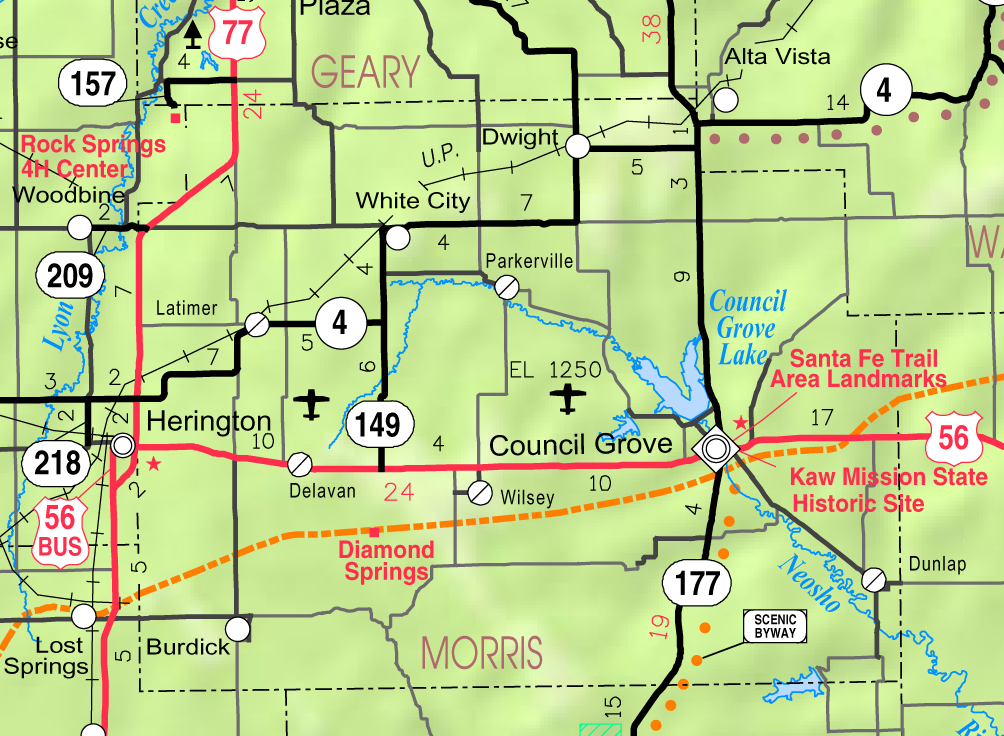
- KDOT map of Morris County (legend)
- Coordinates: 38°38′12″N 96°40′34″W
- Country: United States
- State: Kansas
- County: Morris
- Incorporated: 1910
- Named for: John Wilsey

Government
  - Type: Mayor–Council
  - Mayor: J.C. Sarratt

Area
  - Total: 0.27 sq mi (0.70 km^{2})
  - Land: 0.27 sq mi (0.70 km^{2})
  - Water: 0 sq mi (0.00 km^{2})
- Elevation: 1,506 ft (459 m)

Population (2020)
  - Total: 139
  - Density: 510/sq mi (200/km^{2})
- Time zone: UTC-6 (CST)
  - Summer (DST): UTC-5 (CDT)
- ZIP Code: 66873
- Area code: 785
- FIPS code: 20-79650
- GNIS ID: 477005

Wilsey is a city in Morris County, Kansas, United States. As of the 2020 census, the population of the city was 139.

== History ==
An agricultural-based community, Wilsey was named after pioneer John D. Wilsey. In the early 1880s, the Missouri Pacific Railroad was built through the county, at which time Wilsey established the city. The community once supported a business district and schools.

The post office in Wilsey was discontinued in 1997.

== Geography ==
According to the United States Census Bureau, the city has a total area of 0.28 square miles (0.73 km^{2}), all land.

=== Climate ===
The climate in this area is characterized by hot, humid summers and generally mild to cool winters. According to the Köppen Climate Classification system, Wilsey has a humid subtropical climate, abbreviated "Cfa" on climate maps.

== Demographics ==
Historical population
Census	Pop.	Note	%±
1920	337		—
1930	330		−2.1%
1940	348		5.5%
1950	251		−27.9%
1960	224		−10.8%
1970	169		−24.6%
1980	179		5.9%
1990	149		−16.8%
2000	191		28.2%
2010	153		−19.9%
2020	139		−9.2%
U.S. Decennial Census

=== 2010 census ===
As of the census of 2010, there were 153 people, 66 households, and 43 families residing in the city. The population density was 546.4 inhabitants per square mile (211.0/km^{2}). There were 88 housing units at an average density of 314.3 per square mile (121.4/km^{2}). The racial makeup of the city was 89.5% White, 2.6% African American, 1.3% Native American, 3.9% from other races, and 2.6% from two or more races. Hispanic or Latino of any race were 7.2% of the population.

There were 66 households, of which 24.2% had children under the age of 18 living with them, 51.5% were married couples living together, 4.5% had a female householder with no husband present, 9.1% had a male householder with no wife present, and 34.8% were non-families. 30.3% of all households were made up of individuals, and 12.1% had someone living alone who was 65 years of age or older. The average household size was 2.32 and the average family size was 2.91.

The median age in the city was 41.8 years. 22.9% of residents were under the age of 18; 8.4% were between the ages of 18 and 24; 21% were from 25 to 44; 28.1% were from 45 to 64; and 19.6% were 65 years of age or older. The gender makeup of the city was 52.9% male and 47.1% female.

=== 2000 census ===
As of the census of 2000, there were 191 people, 77 households, and 51 families residing in the city. The population density was 696.6 inhabitants per square mile (269.0/km^{2}). There were 86 housing units at an average density of 313.7 per square mile (121.1/km^{2}). The racial makeup of the city was 97.38% White and 2.62% Native American. Hispanic or Latino of any race were 0.52% of the population.

There were 77 households, out of which 33.8% had children under the age of 18 living with them, 58.4% were married couples living together, 9.1% had a female householder with no husband present, and 32.5% were non-families. 32.5% of all households were made up of individuals, and 16.9% had someone living alone who was 65 years of age or older. The average household size was 2.48 and the average family size was 3.15.

In the city, the population was spread out, with 31.4% under the age of 18, 3.7% from 18 to 24, 26.7% from 25 to 44, 21.5% from 45 to 64, and 16.8% who were 65 years of age or older. The median age was 38 years. For every 100 females, there were 96.9 males. For every 100 females age 18 and over, there were 84.5 males.

The median income for a household in the city was $29,688, and the median income for a family was $37,500. Males had a median income of $26,875 versus $18,750 for females. The per capita income for the city was $10,781. About 2.0% of families and 5.9% of the population were below the poverty line, including 6.8% of those under the age of eighteen and 11.4% of those 65 or over.

== Education ==
The community is served by Morris County USD 417 public school district. The district high school is Council Grove High School.

Wilsey schools were closed through school unification. The Wilsey Wildcats won the Kansas State High School boys class BB basketball championship in 1961.

== See also ==
- Santa Fe Trail
