= Alan Shields =

American artist

- Alan Shields in 1984
- Born: 4 February 1944; Herington, Kansas, United States
- Died: 13 December 2005 (aged 61); Shelter Island, New York
- Education: Kansas State University
- Known for: Paintings, sculptures, prints, works on paper
- Style: Pattern and decoration
- Spouse: Maria Caccese
- Partner: Marla Gagnum

Alan J. Shields (February 4, 1944 – December 13, 2005) was an American painter, and for a time during the 1980s, had a secondary career as a commercial boat operator, including as ferryboat captain.

== Early life and education ==
Shields was born in Herington, Kansas to a farming family—his great-grandfather had been a cattle farmer who had been a homesteader on the Great Plains. Shields often referenced his family in his own art-making. He grew up watching his mother and two younger sisters quilting and embroidering, living on a farm required a degree of frugality and recycling, which is where Shields learned the crafts himself.

He eventually attended Kansas State University from 1963–66 where he studied civil engineering and studio art. In his art education he closely studied the work of Buckminster Fuller. When developing his practice, Shields referenced his studies on Fuller, pointing out that if Fuller's dome-style architecture were to become common, "...there wouldn't be any flat walls to hang a painting." After graduating he went on to participate in Summer Theater Workshops at the University of Maine (1966–67).

== Painting career ==
In 1968, he moved to New York City where he began showing with Paula Cooper Gallery later that year and through 1991. He began his trademark three-dimensional, two-sided paintings in 1970. Shields was immediately distinct from his New York contemporaries, who at the time were largely concerned with minimalism. The vibrant, tactile, and labor intensive works placed him apart from the prevailing contemporary artists. His work was extremely gestural and focused on the physicality of materials. Unlike the minimalists, Shields held a great reverence for craft, sewing and beading are an essential component in Shields' practice. In 1971, Shield's work was featured on the cover of Artforum magazine. In a 1975 interview with artist Howardena Pindell (the two of whom are fundamental to Postminimalism and Process Art), Shields describes how he would first draw a grid in pencil on the back of a canvas, then stitch over the pencil lines with the colored thread in the bobbin and white thread on the top: "So what I did was utilize the fact that the sewing machine could...transcribe drawings that were on the back of the canvas to the front by using the bobbin threads." Shields saw the difference between painting and sewing as marginal, and used the two methods to similar ends.

In 1971, Shields purchased a house on Shelter Island. He kept his studio in New York City for a year until the Shelter Island home became his permanent residence in 1972. He did not give up his SoHo loft until the mid-1980s, at which point he decided to raise his family, grow his own food, become a commercial fisherman and a licensed ferryboat captain. In 1983 he received his first license to operate a commercial watercraft for up to six passengers. He would go on to get a one-hundred ton boating license and become a captain for the North Ferry Company, connecting Shelter Island and Greenport, New York. He converted a greenhouse attached to his home into a studio space. He began to focus on print and papermaking, making over thirty editions between 1971 and 1974. During this period, he would receive the Guggenheim Fellowship and travel to South America for three months in 1973.

In 1980, he went to the Ahmadabad retreat in India. After becoming a ferryboat captain and pursuing an additional career as a commercial fisherman, Shields' passion for fishing began to have a dialectic relationship with his artmaking. The three-dimensional works that are suspended from the ceiling use the same ball bearing swivels used in fishing tackle and fishing gear, and he would also use backing line and monofilaments in the pieces.

In 1999, he decided to move again on Shelter Island, and relocated to a ranch for the remainder of his life.

=== Significant works ===
J + K (1972) industrial webbing, canvas, paint, fishing line and beads

J + K (1972) – The outer framework is constructed from industrial webbing and canvas enclosing a web of fishing line strung with beads. The work, which is in the collection of the Whitney Museum of American Art, refers to the "countercultural aesthetics of the time from tie-dye to love beads." The New York Times notes that Shields "reinvented painting" by doing away with stretcher bars, resulting in painted canvas elements combined with other media such as fishing nets, rope, and industrial materials. J + K is described as "a cat’s cradle of intersecting beaded fishing line and tackle." The curvature of the fishing lines, weighted by tackle recalls the ocean waves.

== Selected solo exhibitions ==
After his first show with Paula Cooper Gallery in 1969, Shields continued to exhibit there with solo shows until 1991. After this period he had two more solo exhibitions with the gallery, in 2013 and 2019. Throughout his life, Shields exhibited in commercial gallery spaces throughout the U.S., Europe, South America, and Asia. In 2011 he had his first show with his subsequent New York gallery: Greenberg Van Doren, who would go on to exhibit his famous Maze installation in 2012 at their gallery space and in 2013 at SITELAB: 3. When the gallery became Van Doren Waxter Shields continued to have solo exhibitions in 2016 with Alan Shields: Space Sisters work from the 1970s, again in 2018 with Alan Shields Rolling Orbit: Prints from the 1970s, and in 2020, with Alan Shields: Worms with Bedroom Eyes.

In 1973, Shields had a two-person show with Richard Artschwager at the Museum of Contemporary Art, Chicago. In 1975, Shields exhibited at the Spencer Museum of Art, University of Kansas, Lawrence, and in the following year his work was presented at the Museu de Arte Moderna, Rio de Janeiro, Brazil. In 1977, the Musée d’Art Moderne de Strasbourg presented a one person show of his work; followed by a solo show at P.S.1 in 1978. In 1979, a one-person exhibition was held at the Williams College Museum of Art, Sterling and Francine Clark Art Institute, and an additional show of his paintings and prints was presented at the Williams College Museum in 1981.

In 1983 a survey of his work, 1968-1983: The Work of Alan Shields, was organized by the Memphis Brooks Museum of Art as a traveling exhibition covering 15 years of the artist's production. It traveled to Lowe Art Museum, Coral Gables, and to the Nelson-Atkins Museum of Art. In 1986, a retrospective show of prints by Shields was shown at the Cleveland Center for Contemporary Arts presented his work, the show included an exhibition catalog.

In 1999, another survey exhibition of Shield's work, Alan Shields: A Survey, was organized and presented by the Beach Museum of Art. In 2007, the Parrish Art Museum, in Southampton, New York presented Alan Shields: Stirring Up the Waters; later in 2014 and in 2017 the Parish Art Museum presented solo exhibitions of the artist. In 2016, another survey show of his work, Alan Shields: Protracted Simplicity (1966-1985), was held at the Aspen Art Museum. More recent exhibitions have been held at the Shelter Island Historical Society, Alan Shields: Where Art Life Met Island Life, at Pace Prints, New York, (both in 2017) and at Goya Contemporary in Baltimore, Alan Shields: Of His Time and Ahead OF His Time, in 2022.

== Selected public collections ==
Shields' work can be found in the following public collections:

- Ackland Art Museum;
- Akron Art Museum;
- Allen Memorial Art Museum;
- Beach Museum of Art;
- Cincinnati Art Museum;
- Cleveland Museum of Art;
- Dallas Museum of Art;
- Fogg Art Museum;
- Frances Lehman Loeb Art Center;
- Herbert F. Johnson Museum;
- High Museum;
- Hirshhorn Museum and Sculpture Garden;
- Jane Voorhees Zimmerli Art Museum;
- Kansas State University;
- Memphis Brooks Museum of Art;
- Metropolitan Museum of Art;
- Milwaukee Art Museum;
- Museum of Contemporary Art Chicago;
- Museum of Fine Arts, Boston;
- Museum of Modern Art;
- National Gallery of New Zealand;
- Nelson-Atkins Museum;
- Parrish Art Museum;
- Solomon R. Guggenheim Museum,;
- Spencer Museum of Art;
- Tate Britain;
- University of Arizona Museum of Art;
- Walker Art Center;
- Whitney Museum of American Art.

== Personal life ==
Shields had two children, a daughter and son, from his first marriage. His companion later in life was Marla Gagnum.

== Death ==
Shields died in his sleep at his home on Shelter Island on December 13, 2005.
