= Morris County USD 417 =

School district in Council Grove, Kansas

Address
- 17 S. Wood St. Council Grove, Kansas, 66846; United States
- Coordinates: 38.6607°N 96.4892°W

District information
- Type: Public
- Grades: K to 12
- Schools: 3

Other information
- Website: usd417.org

Morris County USD 417 is a public unified school district headquartered in Council Grove, Kansas, United States. The district includes the communities of Alta Vista, Council Grove, Diamond Springs, Dunlap, Dwight, Wilsey, Delavan, and nearby rural areas. The district includes much of Morris County, and extends into Lyon and Wabaunsee counties.

== Schools ==
The school district operates the following schools:

- Council Grove Junior Senior High School
- Council Grove Elementary School
- Prairie Heights Elementary School

== See also ==
- Kansas State Department of Education
- Kansas State High School Activities Association
- List of high schools in Kansas
- List of unified school districts in Kansas
