= Comiskey, Kansas =

Ghost town in Morris County, Kansas

- Ghost town
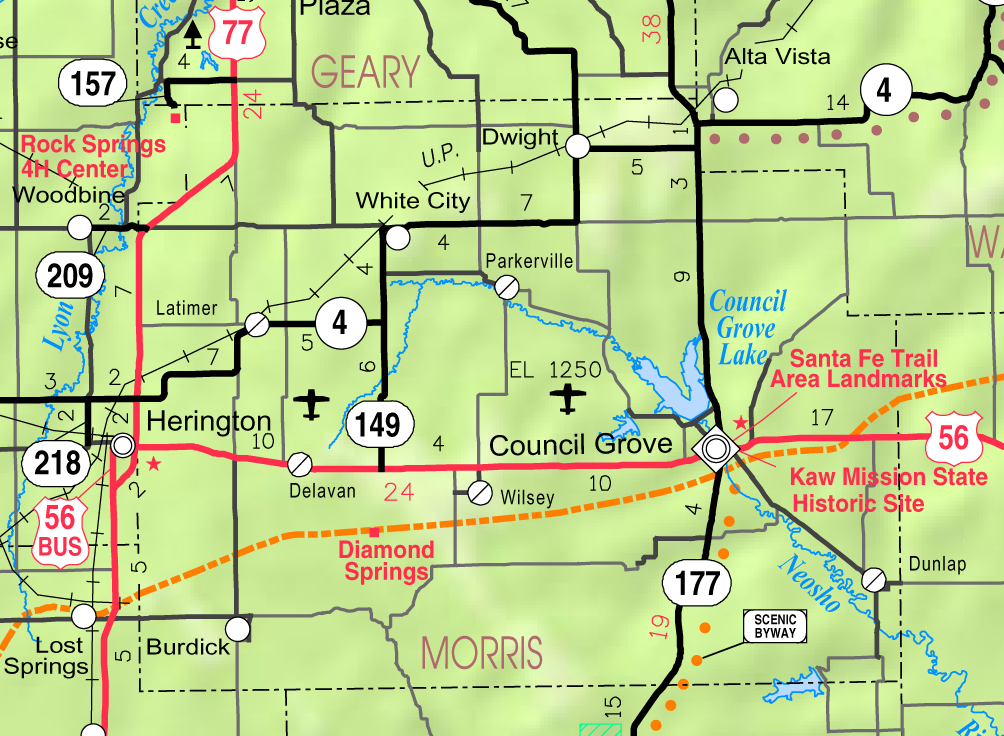
- KDOT map of Morris County (legend)

- Location within Kansas Location within the United States
- Coordinates: 38°38′40″N 96°21′15″W
- Country: United States
- State: Kansas
- County: Morris
- Township: Garfield
- Platted: 1887
- Named for: Charles Comiskey
- Elevation: 1,266 ft (386 m)

Population
  - Total: 0
- Time zone: UTC-6 (CST)
  - Summer (DST): UTC-5 (CDT)
- Area code: 620
- GNIS ID: 481858

Comiskey is a ghost town in Morris County, Kansas, United States. It was located approximately 6 miles (9.7 km) east of Council Grove, next to the county line.

== History ==
Comiskey was platted in 1887 and originally served as a whistle-stop of the Missouri Pacific Railroad. A post office existed in Comiskey from 1887 to 1929. In 1910, the community had a population of 28.

Following the St. Louis Browns' victory in the 1886 World Series over the Chicago White Stockings, the Missouri Pacific Railroad honored several of the St. Louis players by naming some of their depots after the players. This community was named in honor of St. Louis Browns first baseman Charles Comiskey (who would later found the Chicago White Sox and build Comiskey Park). The neighboring city of Bushong was named after Doc Bushong from the same team.

Comiskey Cemetery still exists, approximately 0.5 miles (0.80 km) north of the former community at an area southwest of the intersection of 100 Rd and U Ave.

1887 deed for town of Comiskey

1887 platt for town of Comiskey

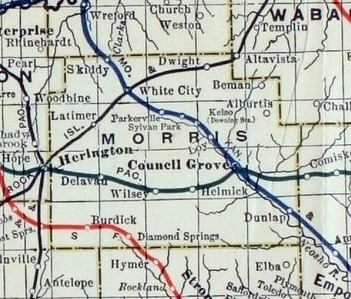
1915-1918 railroad map of Morris County (incorrectly showing Comiskey east of the county line)

== Geography ==
Comiskey was located at 38°38′40″N 96°21′15″W (38.6444525, -96.3541663), which is about 1.5 miles (2.4 km) south of U.S. 56 on 100 Rd in Morris County, which forms the boundary between Morris and Lyon counties.
