= List of people from Dickinson County, Kansas =

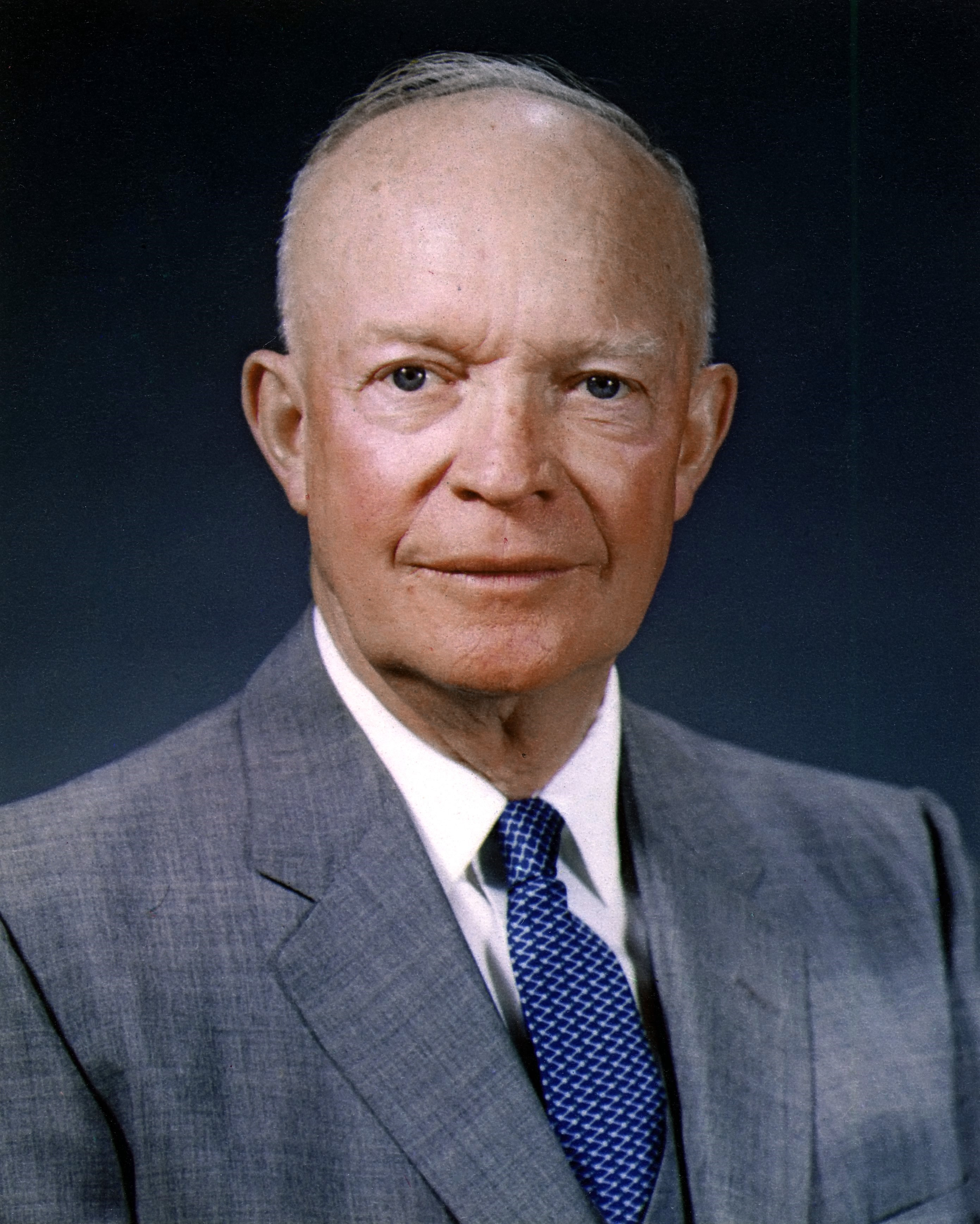
U.S. President Dwight D. Eisenhower considered Abilene to be his hometown.

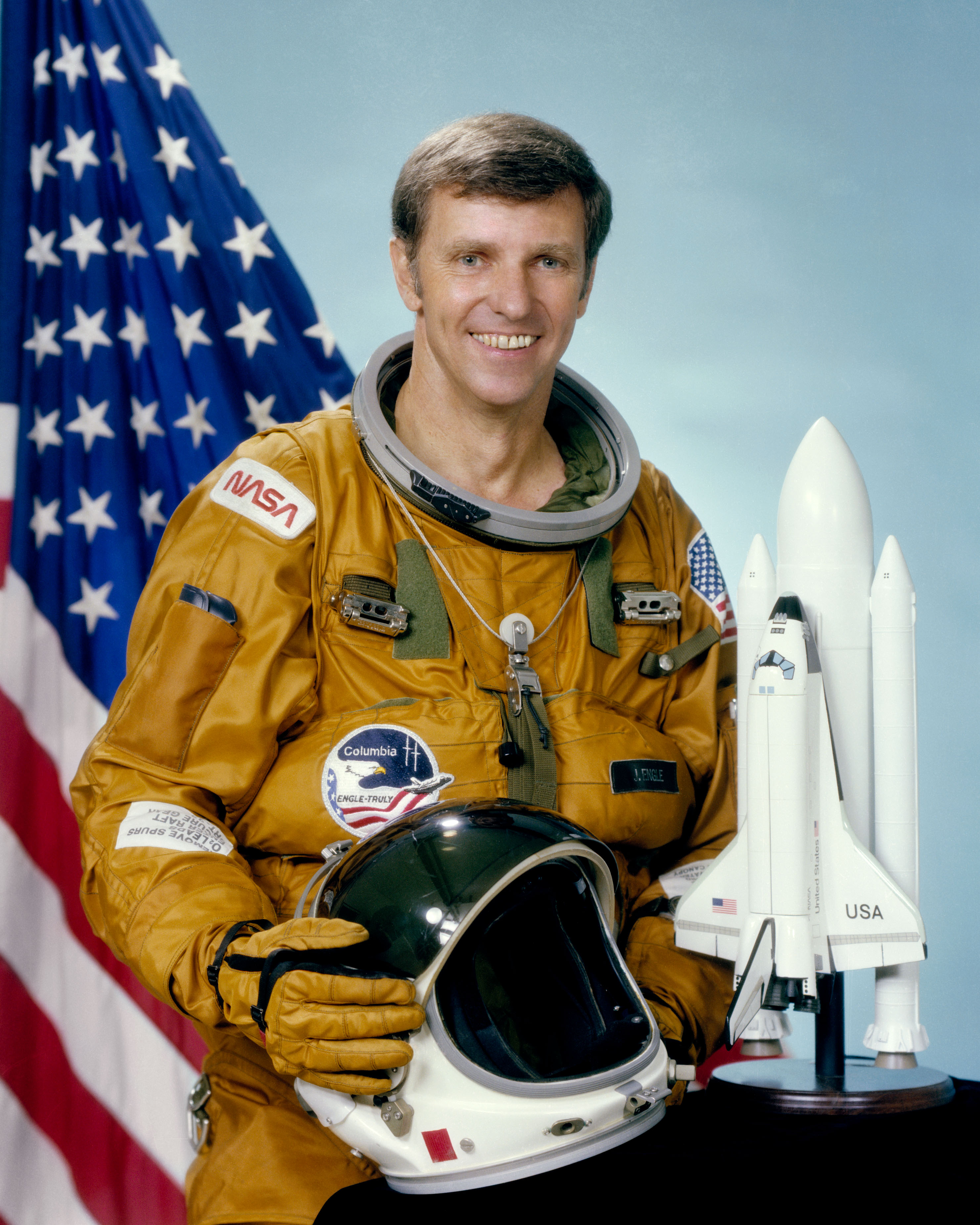
Joe Engle grew up in Chapman and is the only astronaut to manually fly the Space Shuttle through reentry and landing.

The following is a list of people from Dickinson County, Kansas. Inclusion on the list should be reserved for notable people past and present who have resided in the county, either in cities or rural areas.

== Academia ==
- C. Olin Ball, food scientist, inventor
- Deane Malott, university administrator

== Arts and entertainment ==
- Harry Beaumont, director and silent film actor
- Frankie Burke, actor
- Leo Pierson, silent film actor
- Henry Poor, artist and architect

== Athletics ==
- Ralph Faulkner, Olympic fencer
- Robert Rubel, college football coach
- Hy Vandenberg, Major League Baseball pitcher

== Clergy ==
- Bruce Blake, bishop of the United Methodist Church
- John Eastwood, World War II US Army Air Corps chaplain, was stationed at Herington Army Airfield
- Emil Kapaun, Roman Catholic priest and Servant of God, United States Army chaplain, and Medal of Honor recipient

== Journalists ==
- Steve Doocy, journalist, author
- Oscar Stauffer, founder of Stauffer Communications

== Military ==
- Joseph Engle, Space Shuttle astronaut
- Terry Nichols, served in U.S. Army, accomplice in the Oklahoma City bombing of the Alfred P. Murrah Federal Building
- Everett Stewart, World War II flying ace

== Old West ==
Notable people from the American Old West include:

- Phil Coe, gambler
- John Hardin, gunfighter
- Wild Bill Hickok, lawman
- Joseph McCoy, cattle baron
- Tom "Bear River" Smith, lawman
- Ben Thompson, gunfighter
- Libby Thompson, prostitute and dance hall girl

== Politicians ==
- Joseph Burton, U.S. senator from Kansas
- Edward Little, U.S. representative from Kansas
- Kenneth McLeod, Canadian politician
- Frank Parent, California court judge
- Seymour Stedman, lawyer and Socialist candidate for vice president of the United States

=== Eisenhower family ===
- Dwight D. Eisenhower, 34th president of the United States and five-star general
- Earl D. Eisenhower
- Edgar N. Eisenhower
- Milton S. Eisenhower

== Others ==
- Marlin Fitzwater, press secretary to Ronald Reagan and George Bush
- Gregory Frazier, former Chief Agricultural Negotiator for the United States
- Ebby Halliday, centenarian and successful realtor
- Pop Hollinger, pioneer of the market for comic book collection and restoration

== See also ==
- Lists of people from Kansas
