= Diamond Springs, Kansas =

Unincorporated community in Morris County, Kansas

- Unincorporated community
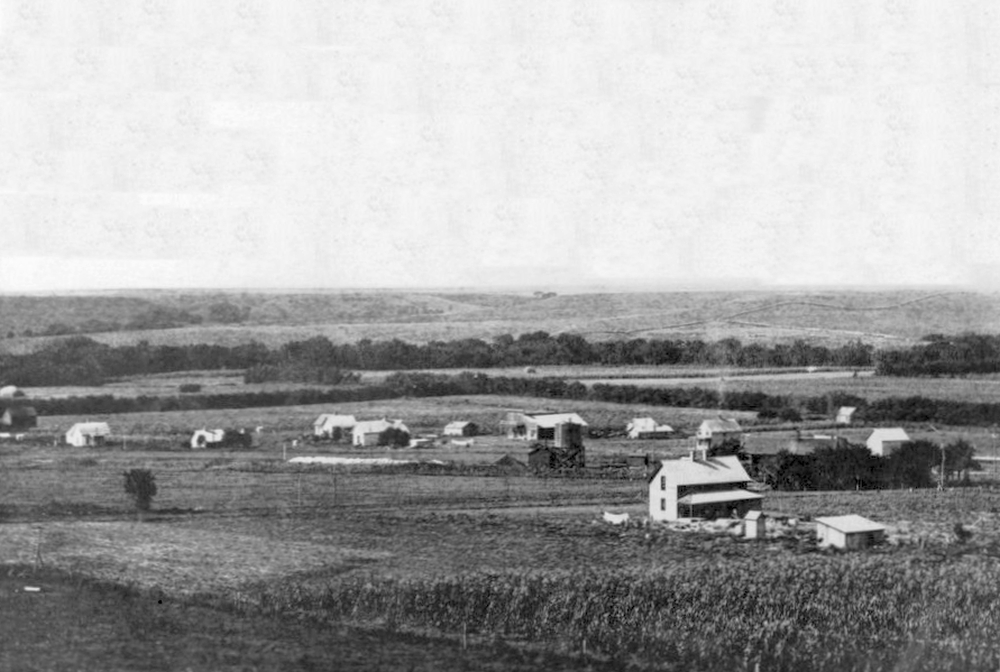
- Diamond Springs, circa 1880-1920

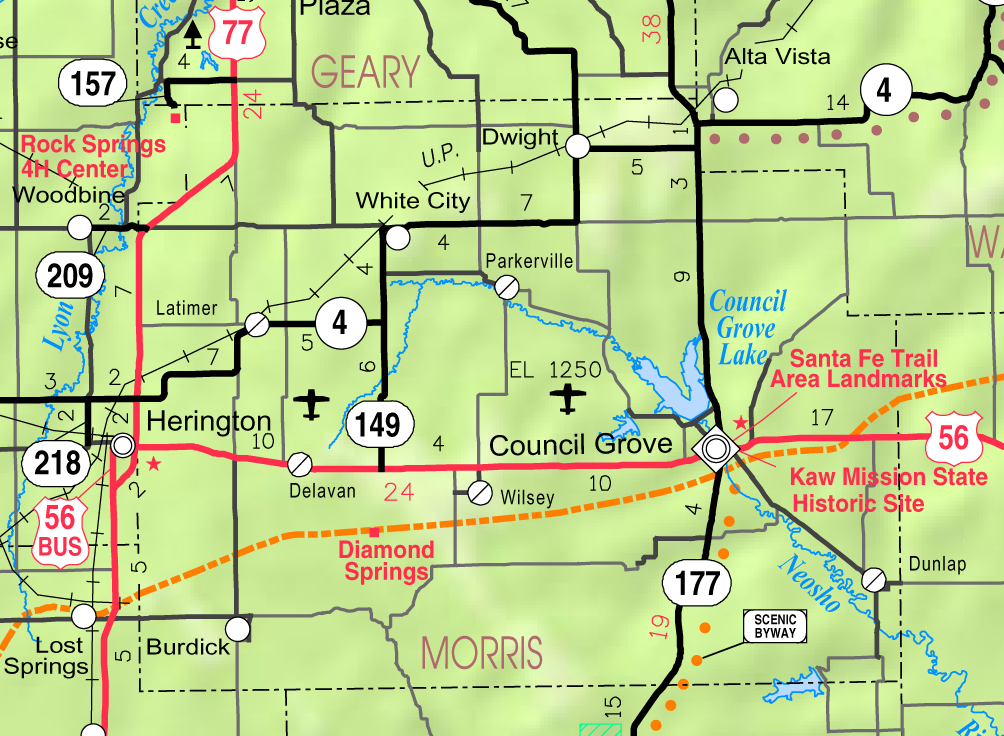
- KDOT map of Morris County (legend)

- Location within Kansas Location within the United States
- Coordinates: 38°33′27″N 96°44′40″W
- Country: United States
- State: Kansas
- County: Morris
- Elevation: 1,339 ft (408 m)
- Time zone: UTC-6 (CST)
  - Summer (DST): UTC-5 (CDT)
- Area code: 785
- FIPS code: 20-18000
- GNIS ID: 484806

Diamond Springs is an unincorporated community in Morris County, Kansas, United States.

== History ==
Diamond Springs takes its name from a stream which was a landmark and watering place for travelers on the Santa Fe Trail, which is located approximately four miles north on private property.

The post office in Diamond Springs was discontinued in 1930.

== Education ==
The community is served by Morris County USD 417 public school district.
