= Herington USD 487 =

Public school district in Herington, Kansas

Address
- 19 N. Broadway St. Herington, Kansas, 67449; United States
- Coordinates: 38°40′16″N 96°56′37″W

District information
- Type: Public
- Grades: K to 12

Other information
- Website: heringtonschools.org

Herington High School

Location
- 1401 North D Street; Herington, (Dickinson County), Kansas 67449; United States

Information
- Type: Public high school
- Principal: Mark Paul
- Staff: 11.40 (FTE)
- Enrollment: 149 (2023-24)
- Student to teacher ratio: 13.07
- Colors: Maroon, orange and white
- Nickname: Railroaders
- Website: Herington High School

Herington USD 487 is a public unified school district headquartered in Herington, Kansas, United States. The district includes the community of Herington, Shady Brook, and nearby rural areas. The district has territory in Dickinson County and in Morris County.

== Schools ==
The school district operates the following schools:

- Herington High School
- Herington Middle School
- Herington Elementary School
- Little Railer Preschool

== See also ==
- Kansas State Department of Education
- Kansas State High School Activities Association
- List of high schools in Kansas
- List of unified school districts in Kansas
