= Delavan, Kansas =

Unincorporated community in Morris County, Kansas

- Unincorporated community
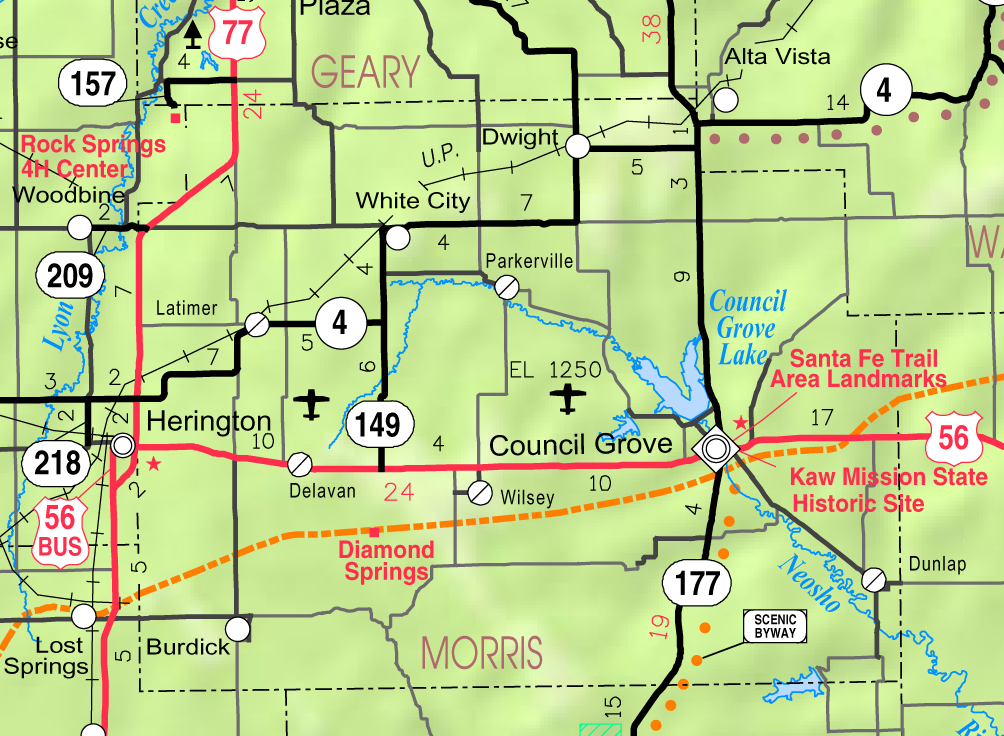
- KDOT map of Morris County (legend)

- Location within Kansas Location within the United States
- Coordinates: 38°39′22″N 96°48′48″W
- Country: United States
- State: Kansas
- County: Morris
- Elevation: 1,503 ft (458 m)
- Time zone: UTC-6 (CST)
  - Summer (DST): UTC-5 (CDT)
- Area code: 785
- FIPS code: 20-17400
- GNIS ID: 476998

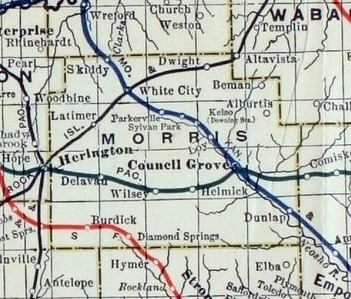
1915 railroad map of Morris County

Delavan is an unincorporated community in Morris County, Kansas, United States.

== History ==
The post office in Delavan was discontinued in 1992.

== Education ==
The community is served by Morris County USD 417 public school district.
