= Bruce P. Blake =

American bishop

Bruce P. Blake is a retired American bishop of the United Methodist Church, elected in 1988.

== Family ==
Blake is from Wichita, Kansas, having graduated in 1955 from the Wichita East High School. In 1957 he married Karen Eileen Miers of Furley, Kansas, who has worked as personal secretary for doctors David and Vera Mace. The Blakes have three sons: Steven Keith, Scott Douglas, and Darin Paul; and four grandchildren.

== Education ==
He graduated from Friends University, Wichita, and from Drew Theological Seminary, Madison, New Jersey, in 1962 cum laude.

== Ordained ministry ==
He served a church in New Jersey while attending Drew. Upon returning to Kansas (the Kansas West Annual Conference), he served the Ransom-Brownell U.M. Charge (1962–67). He was pastor at Herington, Kansas (1967–69); then as the director of the first cooperative ministry in the Kansas West Conference: the Tri-County Cooperative Ministry at Herington (1969–74). He then served as senior pastor at Woodlawn U.M.C., Derby, Kansas (1974–84). Bruce then served as president of Southwestern College, Winfield, Kansas (1984–88).

== Episcopal ministry ==
Blake was elected to the episcopacy in 1988 by the South Central Jurisdictional Conference of the U.M. Church. He was assigned to the Dallas Episcopal Area. In 1996 he was assigned to the Oklahoma Area. In retirement, the Blakes reside in Winfield, Kansas.

== See also ==
- List of bishops of the United Methodist Church
