= Herington, Kansas =

City in Dickinson and Morris Counties of Kansas

- City
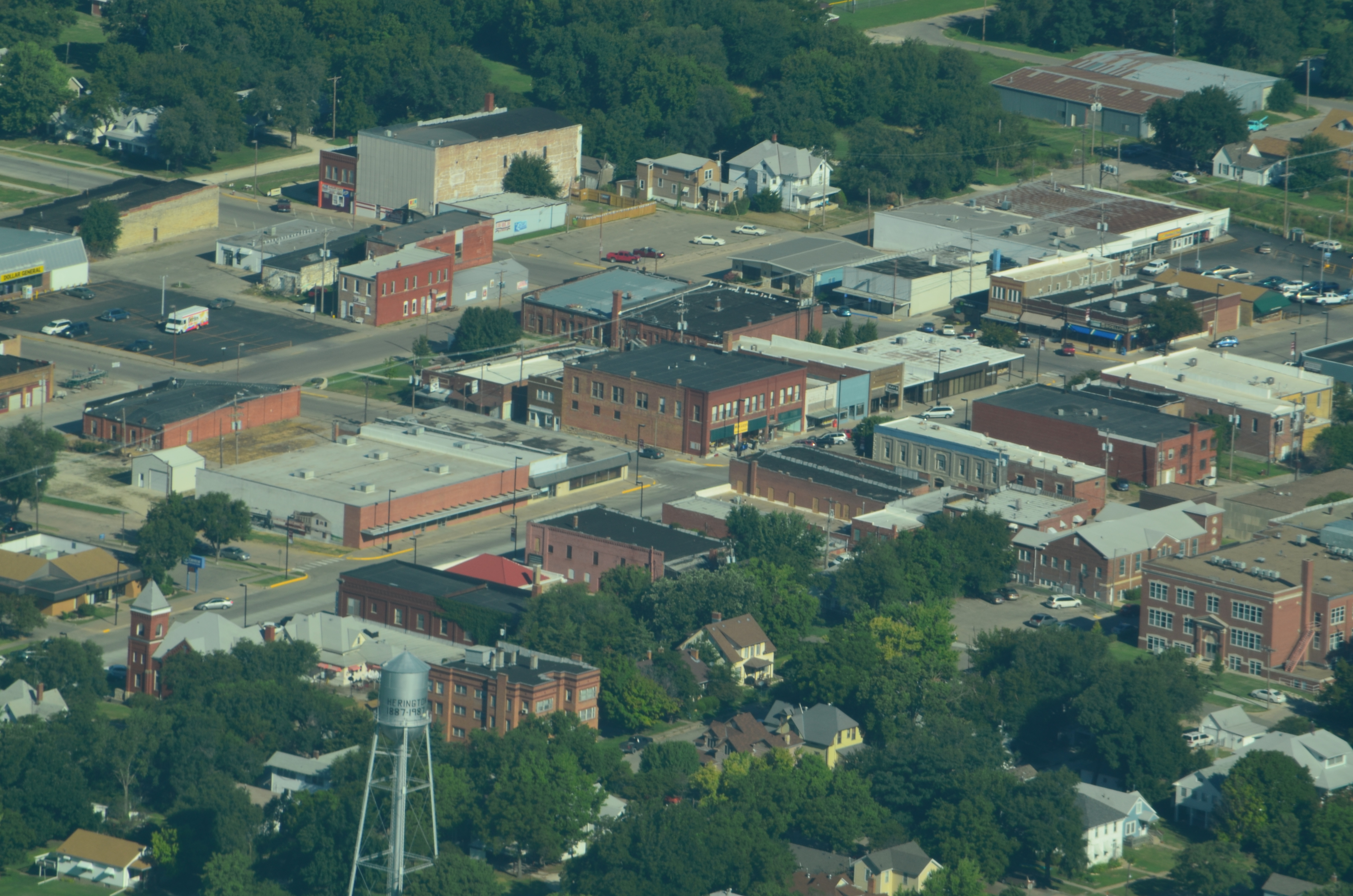
- Aerial view of Herington (2013)

- Location within Dickinson County and Kansas

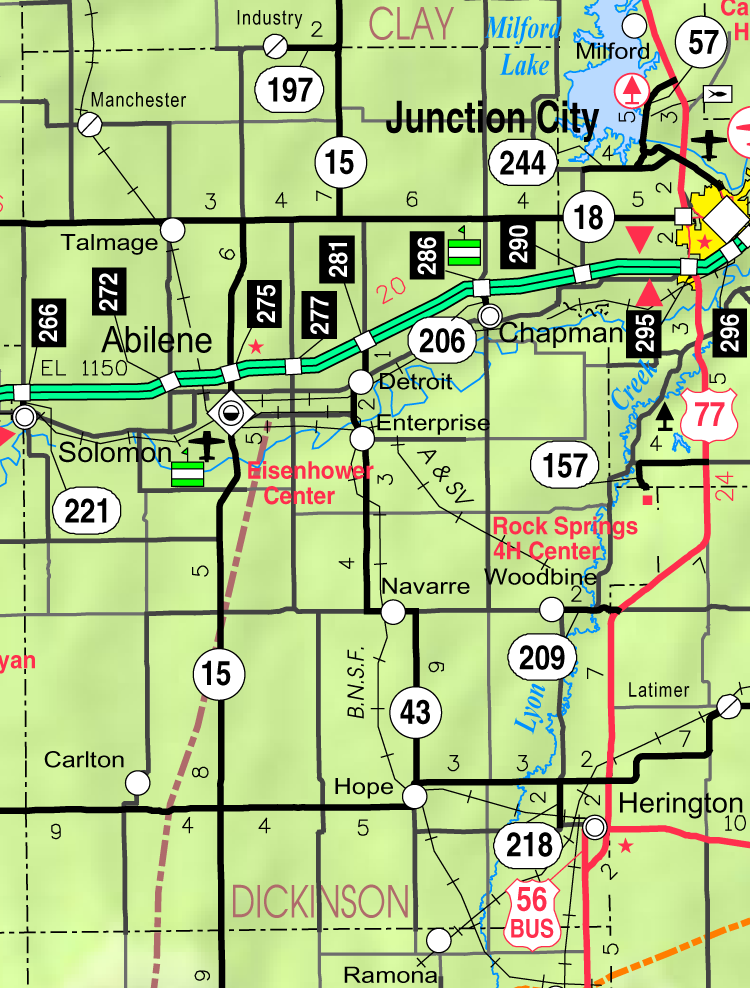
- KDOT map of Dickinson County (legend)
- Coordinates: 38°40′25″N 96°56′41″W
- Country: United States
- State: Kansas
- Counties: Dickinson, Morris
- Founded: 1880s
- Incorporated: 1887
- Named for: Monroe Herington

Government
  - Type: Commissioner-Manager
  - City Manager

Area
  - Total: 4.85 sq mi (12.57 km^{2})
  - Land: 4.83 sq mi (12.50 km^{2})
  - Water: 0.027 sq mi (0.07 km^{2})
- Elevation: 1,463 ft (446 m)

Population (2020)
  - Total: 2,109
  - Density: 437.0/sq mi (168.7/km^{2})
- Time zone: UTC-6 (CST)
  - Summer (DST): UTC-5 (CDT)
- ZIP Code: 67449
- Area code: 785
- FIPS code: 20-31400
- GNIS ID: 485590
- Website: cityofherington.com

Herington is a city in Dickinson and Morris counties in the U.S. state of Kansas. As of the 2020 census, the population of the city was 2,109.

== History ==
=== 19th century ===
Herington was named after its founder, Monroe Davis Herington. His name at birth was Davis Monroe Herrington, but he later dropped the second "r" from his last name.

The first post office in Herington was established in February 1884.

In 1887, Mr. Herington successfully got the Chicago, Kansas and Nebraska Railway to build through Herington. He gave the land and right-of-way for Herington to become a division point with shops, two round houses, freight house, bridge yards, telegraph office and many other buildings. He furnished the limestone for the freight house, and for a two-story depot that was 28 by 66 feet (8.5 m × 20.1 m) and later enlarged to 28 by 105 feet (8.5 m × 32.0 m). That same year, the Chicago, Kansas and Nebraska Railway built a main line from Topeka to Herington. Also in 1887, the Chicago, Kansas and Nebraska Railway extended its main line from Herington to Pratt. This line is called the "Golden State Limited". That same year, the Chicago, Kansas and Nebraska Railway built a branch line north–south from Herington to Caldwell. By 1893, this branch line was incrementally built to Fort Worth, Texas. This line is called the "OKT".

The Chicago, Kansas and Nebraska Railway was foreclosed in 1891 and was taken over by Chicago, Rock Island and Pacific Railway, which shut down in 1980 and reorganized as Oklahoma, Kansas and Texas Railroad, merged in 1988 with Missouri Pacific Railroad, merged in 1997 with Union Pacific Railroad. Most locals still refer to this railroad as the "Rock Island".

=== 20th century ===
The National Old Trails Road, also known as the Ocean-to-Ocean Highway, was established in 1912, and was routed through Herington, Delavan, and Council Grove. The American Discovery Trail passes through Herington.

In World War II, Herington Army Airfield was built and was one of only two fields that processed heavy bombardment crews and equipment staging to the coasts for overseas duty. The field was later turned over to the City of Herington and is currently used as a municipal airport.

== Geography ==
According to the United States Census Bureau, the city has a total area of 5.09 square miles (13.18 km^{2}), of which 5.06 square miles (13.11 km^{2}) is land and 0.03 square miles (0.08 km^{2}) is water.

=== Climate ===
Climate data for Herington, Kansas (1991–2020 normals, extremes 1924–present)
Month	Jan	Feb	Mar	Apr	May	Jun	Jul	Aug	Sep	Oct	Nov	Dec	Year
Record high °F (°C)	78 (26)	82 (28)	89 (32)	97 (36)	99 (37)	111 (44)	111 (44)	112 (44)	109 (43)	96 (36)	87 (31)	75 (24)	112 (44)
Mean maximum °F (°C)	63.2 (17.3)	69.0 (20.6)	79.1 (26.2)	86.3 (30.2)	90.1 (32.3)	95.7 (35.4)	101.6 (38.7)	99.8 (37.7)	94.5 (34.7)	87.3 (30.7)	74.0 (23.3)	64.4 (18.0)	102.9 (39.4)
Mean daily maximum °F (°C)	39.9 (4.4)	44.8 (7.1)	55.8 (13.2)	65.6 (18.7)	74.7 (23.7)	84.9 (29.4)	90.0 (32.2)	88.5 (31.4)	80.5 (26.9)	68.6 (20.3)	54.5 (12.5)	42.6 (5.9)	65.9 (18.8)
Daily mean °F (°C)	28.3 (−2.1)	32.6 (0.3)	43.3 (6.3)	53.2 (11.8)	63.5 (17.5)	73.7 (23.2)	78.7 (25.9)	76.8 (24.9)	68.1 (20.1)	55.5 (13.1)	42.4 (5.8)	31.6 (−0.2)	54.0 (12.2)
Mean daily minimum °F (°C)	16.8 (−8.4)	20.5 (−6.4)	30.7 (−0.7)	40.7 (4.8)	52.3 (11.3)	62.5 (16.9)	67.3 (19.6)	65.1 (18.4)	55.8 (13.2)	42.4 (5.8)	30.3 (−0.9)	20.6 (−6.3)	42.1 (5.6)
Mean minimum °F (°C)	−1.3 (−18.5)	2.7 (−16.3)	11.8 (−11.2)	24.1 (−4.4)	35.2 (1.8)	48.7 (9.3)	55.7 (13.2)	53.2 (11.8)	39.3 (4.1)	24.8 (−4.0)	13.8 (−10.1)	3.2 (−16.0)	−5.5 (−20.8)
Record low °F (°C)	−22 (−30)	−17 (−27)	−9 (−23)	8 (−13)	26 (−3)	38 (3)	44 (7)	44 (7)	28 (−2)	11 (−12)	−4 (−20)	−23 (−31)	−23 (−31)
Average precipitation inches (mm)	0.82 (21)	1.22 (31)	2.27 (58)	3.45 (88)	5.11 (130)	4.61 (117)	4.18 (106)	4.28 (109)	3.00 (76)	2.42 (61)	1.58 (40)	1.33 (34)	34.27 (870)
Average snowfall inches (cm)	3.6 (9.1)	3.6 (9.1)	1.8 (4.6)	0.2 (0.51)	0.0 (0.0)	0.0 (0.0)	0.0 (0.0)	0.0 (0.0)	0.0 (0.0)	0.1 (0.25)	0.8 (2.0)	3.0 (7.6)	13.1 (33)
Average precipitation days (≥ 0.01 in)	4.0	4.3	6.6	7.9	10.2	8.4	8.6	8.0	6.5	6.1	4.8	4.3	79.7
Average snowy days (≥ 0.1 in)	2.5	1.7	0.9	0.2	0.0	0.0	0.0	0.0	0.0	0.1	0.5	1.7	7.6
Source: NOAA

== Demographics ==
Historical population
Census	Pop.	Note	%±
1890	1,353		—
1900	1,607		18.8%
1910	3,273		103.7%
1920	4,065		24.2%
1930	4,519		11.2%
1940	3,804		−15.8%
1950	3,775		−0.8%
1960	3,702		−1.9%
1970	3,165		−14.5%
1980	2,930		−7.4%
1990	2,685		−8.4%
2000	2,563		−4.5%
2010	2,526		−1.4%
2020	2,109		−16.5%
U.S. Decennial Census

=== 2020 census ===
As of the 2020 census, Herington had a population of 2,109 and 515 families. The population density was 437.0 inhabitants per square mile (168.7/km^{2}), and there were 1,263 housing units at an average density of 261.7 per square mile (101.0/km^{2}).

The median age was 43.3 years. Of residents, 22.4% were under the age of 18, 6.0% were from 18 to 24, 23.3% were from 25 to 44, 26.3% were from 45 to 64, and 22.0% were 65 years of age or older. For every 100 females, there were 94.6 males, and for every 100 females age 18 and over there were 92.7 males age 18 and over.

Of the population, 0.0% lived in urban areas and 100.0% lived in rural areas.

There were 948 households, of which 23.4% had children under the age of 18 living in them. Of all households, 40.6% were married-couple households, 23.1% were households with a male householder and no spouse or partner present, and 28.0% were households with a female householder and no spouse or partner present. About 38.9% of all households were made up of individuals, and 19.9% had someone living alone who was 65 years of age or older. The average household size was 2.0 and the average family size was 2.8.

Of housing units, 24.9% were vacant. The homeowner vacancy rate was 6.5% and the rental vacancy rate was 22.0%.

Racial composition as of the 2020 census
Race	Number	Percent
White	1,880	89.1%
Black or African American	12	0.6%
American Indian and Alaska Native	20	0.9%
Asian	12	0.6%
Native Hawaiian and Other Pacific Islander	3	0.1%
Some other race	44	2.1%
Two or more races	138	6.5%
Hispanic or Latino (of any race)	117	5.5%

Of the population, 87.3% was non-Hispanic white.

=== Education ===
The percent of those with a bachelor's degree or higher was estimated to be 14.6% of the population.

=== Income and poverty ===
The 2016–2020 5-year American Community Survey estimates show that the median household income was $46,786 (with a margin of error of +/- $8,335) and the median family income was $58,214 (+/- $8,957). Males had a median income of $33,565 (+/- $4,114) versus $22,652 (+/- $3,929) for females. The median income for those above 16 years old was $30,025 (+/- $4,914). Approximately, 17.1% of families and 20.3% of the population were below the poverty line, including 32.8% of those under the age of 18 and 20.5% of those ages 65 or over.

=== 2010 census ===
As of the census of 2010, there were 2,526 people, 1,082 households, and 666 families living in the city. The population density was 499.2 inhabitants per square mile (192.7/km^{2}). There were 1,300 housing units at an average density of 256.9 per square mile (99.2/km^{2}). The racial makeup of the city was 93.3% White, 0.4% African American, 0.9% Native American, 0.5% Asian, 0.2% Pacific Islander, 1.7% from other races, and 2.9% from two or more races. Hispanic or Latino of any race were 5.7% of the population.

There were 1,082 households, of which 32.3% had children under the age of 18 living with them, 44.0% were married couples living together, 12.4% had a female householder with no husband present, 5.2% had a male householder with no wife present, and 38.4% were non-families. 33.5% of all households were made up of individuals, and 16.8% had someone living alone who was 65 years of age or older. The average household size was 2.29 and the average family size was 2.89.

The median age in the city was 39.2 years. 25.1% of residents were under the age of 18; 7.8% were between the ages of 18 and 24; 22.8% were from 25 to 44; 24.4% were from 45 to 64; and 19.9% were 65 years of age or older. The gender makeup of the city was 47.8% male and 52.2% female.

== Area attractions ==
Local attractions include:

- Herington Historical Museum.
- The Kansas Historical Marker of Dwight David Eisenhower is approximately 1 mi (1.6 km) south of Herington. In 2012, the Eisenhower marker replaced the previous "Father Juan De Padilla And Quivira" marker.

== Government ==
The Herington government is a Commissioner-Manager form of government. The commission appoints a mayor every year to represent the City in a ceremonial role. The commissioner elections are at-large.

== Education ==
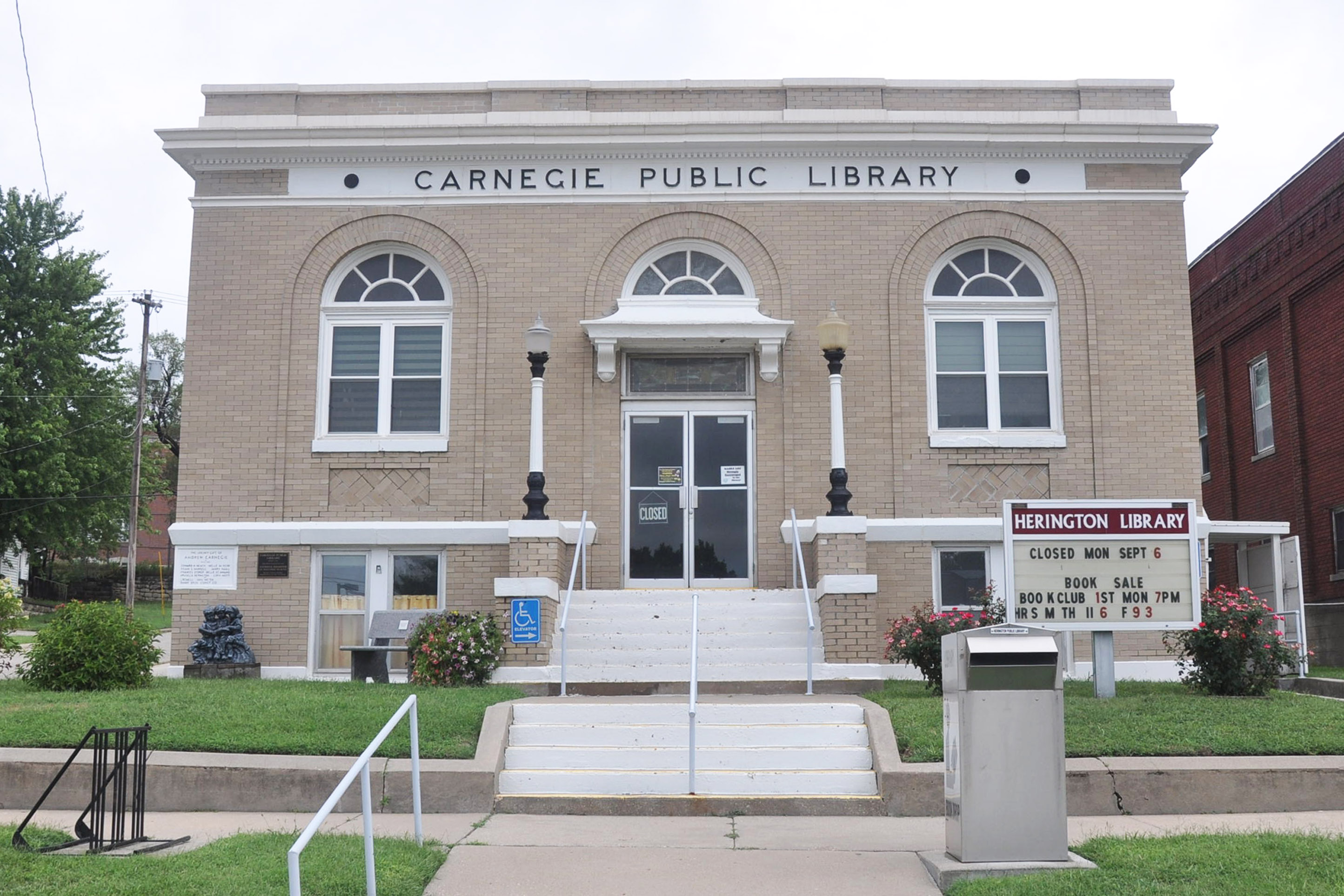
Herington Public Library

=== Primary and secondary education ===
The community is served by Herington USD 487 public school district. The high school is a member of T.E.E.N., a shared video teaching network between five area high schools.

Schools in Herington include:

- Herington High School.
- Herington Middle School.
- Herington Elementary School.
- Herington Little Railer Preschool.

=== Library ===
The Herington Public Library is a Carnegie library.

== Infrastructure ==
=== Transportation ===
==== Rail ====
From its beginnings, Herington has been a hub for the Rock Island, the Cotton Belt Route, Southern Pacific, and currently Union Pacific Railroad. UP still uses this as its hub on its system to this day. Herington has also been served by the Rio Grande, Missouri Pacific, and the Oklahoma, Kansas and Texas Railroad.

==== Air ====
Airports include:

- Herington Regional Airport, FAA:HRU.
- ICAO:KHRU, located east of Herington.

== Notable people ==
See List of people from Dickinson County, Kansas

- Bruce P. Blake, Bishop of the United Methodist Church
- Brad Crandall, radio personality
- Louis Durant (1910–1972) race car driver
- John Eastwood (1911–2007), World War II United States Army Air Forces chaplain
- Nathan Johnson (1926–2021), African American modernist architect
- Emil Kapaun (1916–1951), Roman Catholic priest and Medal Of Honor recipient United States Army chaplain
- Terry Nichols, accomplice in the 1995 Oklahoma City bombing of the Alfred P. Murrah Federal Building
- Alan Shields (1944–2005) American visual artist, painter
- Calvin Wright, Idaho politician

== See also ==
- National Old Trails Road
