= Council Grove High School =

Public school in Kansas, United States

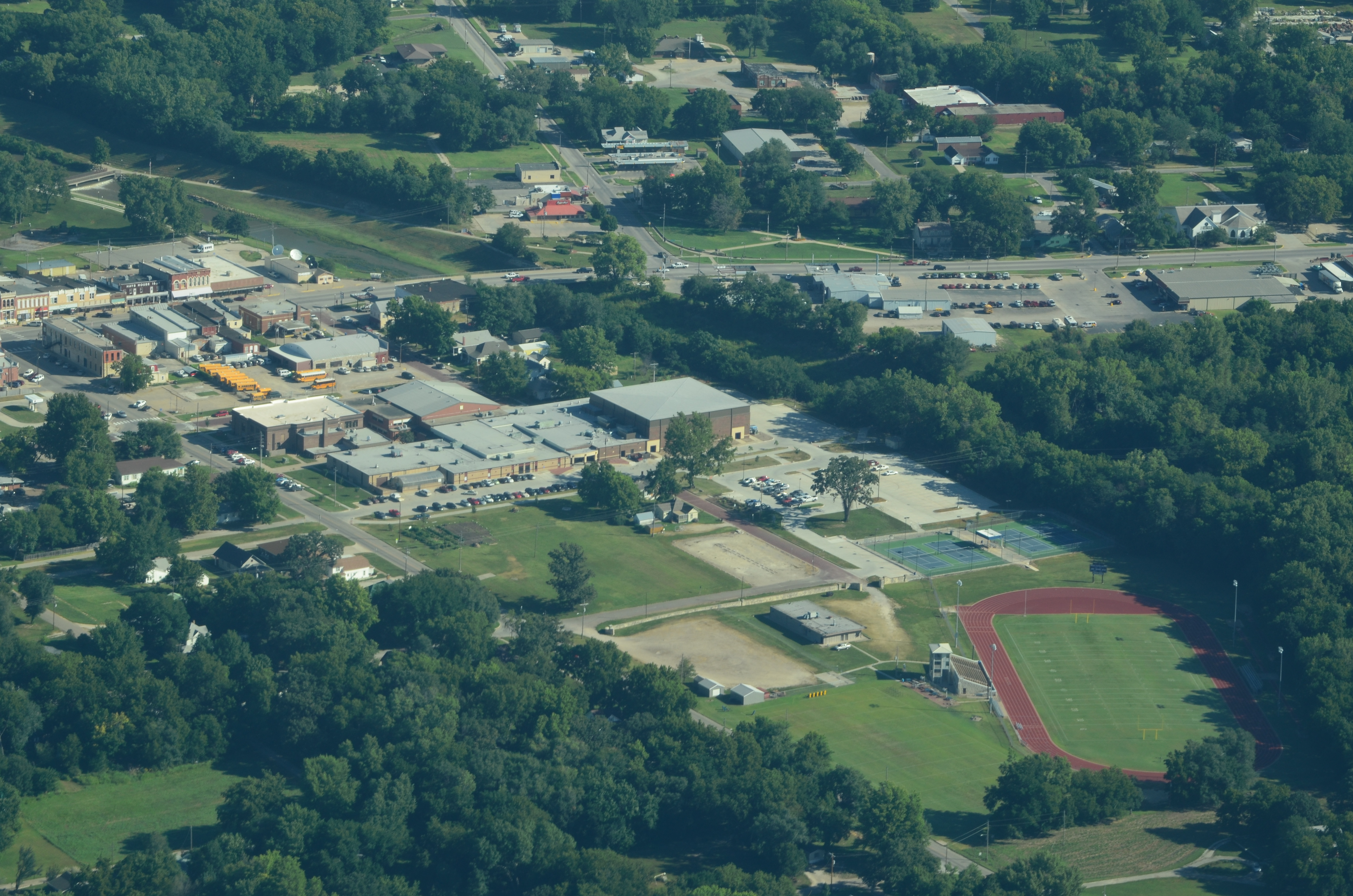
- Aerial photo of Council Grove High School

Location
- 129 Hockaday Street; Council Grove, Kansas 66846; United States; 38.659774°N 96.489405°W

Information
- School type: Public, High School
- School board: Board Website
- School district: Morris County USD 417
- CEEB code: 170690
- Principal: Jay Doornbos
- Grades: 7 to 12
- Enrollment: 360 (2023-2024)
- Colors: Blue and Gold
- Athletics conference: Flint Hills League
- Mascot: Braves & Arrowhead
- Rival: Osage City High School
- Website: School Website

Council Grove High School is a public high school located in Council Grove, Kansas, United States, and operated by Morris County USD 417 school district. The school serves students in grades 9 to 12 and educates approximately 226 students. The principal is Jay Doornbos. The school mascot is the Brave Indian and the school colors are blue and gold. Throughout its history, the athletic teams have won several state championships.

== Extracurricular activities ==
Owing to the school's small size, Council Grove offers a relatively small number of clubs and programs. The school is a member of the Kansas State High School Activities Association and is classified as a 3A school. The athletic teams at Council Grove are known as the "Braves". Throughout the school's history, the Braves have won several state championships and have produced a few collegiate athletes. Most notably, Gary Carrier (6'7) in the mid-1980s and Chris Baker (6'0) in the early 1990s, number one and number two all time in scoring respectively in basketball. Pundits say Baker, despite his size (6'0), is arguably the best all around player to ever grace the court from Council Grove High School. Both went on to have well-known and successful college careers. Some prominent sports at Council Grove High School are football, basketball, wrestling, cheerleading, and the Bravette dance team.

=== Athletics ===
==== State championships ====
State Championships
Season	Sport	Number of Championships	Year
Fall	Volleyball	1	1984
Spring	Golf, Girls	2	1979, 1980
Spring	Golf, Boys (2-Man)	1	1979
Total		4	

== See also ==
- List of high schools in Kansas
- List of unified school districts in Kansas
