= Oklahoma, Kansas and Texas Railroad =

Railway line in the United States

Overview
- Headquarters: Dallas, TX
- Reporting mark: OKKT
- Locale: Oklahoma, Kansas, Texas
- Dates of operation: 1980–1988

Technical
- Track gauge: 4 ft 8 1/2 in (1,435 mm) standard gauge

The Oklahoma, Kansas and Texas Railroad (OKT) (reporting mark OKKT) was a railroad operating in its namesake states in the 1980s.

== OKT I ==
The Oklahoma, Kansas and Texas Railroad was originally created on May 29, 1980, after the demise of the Chicago, Rock Island and Pacific Railroad on March 31, 1980. A subsidiary of the Missouri-Kansas-Texas Railroad (MKT), it operated 767 miles (1,234 km) of the former Rock Island's Herington, Kansas, to Fort Worth, Texas, North-South line, as a cooperative venture with local shippers providing $3 million in initial start-up costs. The original OKT North-South route ran from St. Joe, Missouri, to Topeka, Kansas, south through Herington, Wichita, Enid and El Reno to Fort Worth. It also originally operated several of the former Rock Island's branch lines including: Herington to Salina; Ponca City to Enid; Chickasha to Anadarko and Lawton; and from Waurika to Walters. In addition, a small portion of the Rock Island's East-West mainline was operated between El Reno and nearby Oklahoma City.

During the original version of the OKT, a total of 61,891 cars were moved during 1981, with the first train leaving Dallas, the company's headquarters, on June 6, 1980. Although the MKT supplied the bulk of operating equipment during OKT I, additional leased equipment was obtained for use on the line, including leased EMD GP38s from Conrail and a number of cabooses leased from Conrail and from the Alaska Railroad. However, due to poor financial performance, MKT management sought reduced rentals from the Rock Island Trustee, with both sides going back and forth until MKT shut down its original OKT operations on December 31, 1981. The State of Oklahoma and the Oklahoma, Kansas and Texas Rail Users' Association helped the two sides to reach consensus on a purchase price. On October 20, 1982, U.S. District Judge Frank McGarr approved the sale of the Herington, Kansas, to Ft Worth, Texas, line to MKT subsidiary OKT for $55 million, consisting of 645 miles (1,038 km) of line.

== Interim operations between OKT I and OKT II ==
During negotiations in 1981 and 1982, Okarche Central Railway (OCRI) operated portions of the line between Enid & El Reno and from El Reno to Oklahoma City, North Central Texas Railway (NCTR) operated portions of the line between Dallas, Texas, and Chico, Texas, Enid Central Railway (ENIC), which began operations January 1, 1982, and ceased all operations on February 28, 1983, operated line between Enid & El Reno and between Enid & Ponca City, and North Central Oklahoma Railway (NCOK) operated Chickasha to El Reno as well as the branch line between Chickasha and Anadarko. OCRI, NCTR, NCOK, and ENIC all were owned by the same corporation.

== OKT II ==
After the line was finally purchased from the Rock Island Trustee, the second version of the OKT reinstated operations on November 1, 1982. Somewhat similar to the first OKT operation, the second version still included the Herington to Dallas mainline; the El Reno to Oklahoma City secondary main; the Chickasha to Lawton branch; and the Waurika to Walters branch. In addition, the line also acquired the Herington to Abilene branch as well as the Rock Island's trackage rights over the Union Pacific Railroad (UP) between Abilene and Salina. Notably absent during the second OKT operation was the Enid to Ponca City branch line and the Topeka to St. Joe line, both of which were quickly abandoned. The startup of OKT II displaced the NCTR, NCOK, and ENIC. The ENIC ceased operations on February 28, 1983, and the NCTR on October 31, 1982. NCOK began operating a westward line from El Reno to Geary, Oklahoma, and then northward through Watonga, Okeene and Homestead on March 1, 1983 until it became under AT&L control in 1985.

The OKT proved to be a valuable addition to the MKT Lines and generated thousands of carloads annually. The main commodities shipped on the line were wheat and corn from Kansas and Oklahoma, and sand, gravel and other aggregates from several on line facilities including Chico, Richard's Spur, Waurika and Dover. Although the line utilized the majority of its equipment from the parent MKT, the line did receive its own jumbo wheat hoppers lettered OKKT as well as several EMD GP39-2s and GP38s which also displayed a small OKT logo.

== Operations ==
Primary trains on the route consisted of daily Wichita to Ft. Worth freights, Trains 503 (southbound) and 504 (northbound). An occasional second section was operated (usually a unit grain train) which were assigned Trains 603 (southbound) and 604 (northbound). A five-day a week El Reno Turn was operated between Oklahoma City and El Reno as Train 537 (westbound) and Train 538 (eastbound). The 7 day a week Oklahoma City to Richards Spur rock trains were Trains 521 and 531 (southbound empties) and Trains 522 and 532 (northbound loads). These trains also provided all local switching to any on line customers at Anadarko, Apache and Lawton. Locals on the Walters Branch were operated as extras. The seven-day-a-week Chico Turn rock trains (Dallas-Ft. Worth to Chico) were assigned as Train 550 (northbound empties) and Train 551 (southbound loads).

== Mergers ==
Like its parent corporation the MKT, the OKT became a part of the Missouri Pacific Railroad Company (MPRR) on August 12, 1988. On January 1, 1997, MPRR merged into the Union Pacific.
