= Chicago, Kansas and Nebraska Railway =

Railway in America

The Chicago, Kansas and Nebraska Railway (CK&N) was formed in 1885 under the presidency of Marcus Low, a former attorney for the Chicago, Rock Island and Pacific Railroad. The CRI&P advanced the CK&N about twenty-five million dollars to begin construction in exchange for nearly all of the CK&N's stock. The CK&N put down about 1388 miles of track, mostly in Kansas, Nebraska, Colorado and Indian Territory. The company entered Oklahoma Territory in 1888, building tracks south along the Chisholm Trail and reaching the Red River by 1892. In 1889, the CK&N was failing to make payments on its interest, so the Chicago, Rock Island and Pacific Railroad took over.

== Construction Record ==
- 1886: Elwood KS - Horton KS, Beatrice NE - Fairbury NE
- 1887: Horton KS - Beatrice NE, Horton KS - Topeka KS - Herington KS - Caldwell KS, Herington KS - Salina KS, Fairbury KS - Belleville KS - Mankato KS, Belleville KS - MacFarland KS
- 1888: Mankato KS - Goodland KS - Limon CO - Colorado Springs CO, Herington KS - Liberal KS, purchased Dodge City KS - Bucklin KS
- 1889: Caldwell KS - El Reno IT
- 1890: El Reno IT - Minco IT
