= National Register of Historic Places listings in Morris County, Kansas =

Location of Morris County in Kansas

This is a list of the National Register of Historic Places listings in Morris County, Kansas.

This is intended to be a complete list of the properties and districts on the National Register of Historic Places in Morris County, Kansas, United States. The locations of National Register properties and districts for which the latitude and longitude coordinates are included below, may be seen in a map.

There are 28 properties and districts listed on the National Register in the county, including 1 National Historic Landmark.

This National Park Service list is complete through NPS recent listings posted October 30, 2026.

== Current listings ==
	Name on the Register	Image	Date listed	Location	City or town	Description
1	Big John Farm Limestone Bank Barn	Big John Farm Limestone Bank Barn	October 25, 1990 (#90001576)	North of U.S. Route 56, east of Big John Creek; 38°40′13″N 96°26′58″W	Council Grove	Built 1871-1872, the limestone barn measures 76 feet by 40 feet. The stone walls are two feet thick. The roof is of a double truss design of native oak. The property, at one time, was owned by Seth Hays and it is likely he paid for its construction.
2	Oscar Carlson House	Oscar Carlson House	May 26, 2000 (#00000533)	K-2; 38°32′11″N 96°52′53″W	Burdick	Designed and built in 1930 by Swen Johnson and Oscar Carlson, this is a 1 1/2-story farmhouse bungalow containing many built-in features for convenience.
3	Cottage House Hotel	Cottage House Hotel	August 4, 1988 (#88001172)	25 N. Neosho; 38°39′42″N 96°29′23″W	Council Grove	
4	Council Grove Carnegie Library	Council Grove Carnegie Library	June 25, 1987 (#87000963)	303 W. Main; 38°39′35″N 96°29′37″W	Council Grove	
5	Council Grove Downtown Historic District	Council Grove Downtown Historic District	July 30, 2010 (#10000519)	Beginning at the Neosho River on W. Main St. to Belfry St. and extending north to Columbia St. between Neosho and Mission Streets; 38°39′40″N 96°29′32″W	Council Grove	The historic district contains seventy-one buildings dating from the mid and late 19th and early 20th century. The earliest building is Conn Mercantile constructed in 1853 and used as a general store and way station for travelers on the Santa Fe Trail.
6	Council Grove Historic District	Council Grove Historic District	October 15, 1966 (#66000347)	U.S. Route 56; 38°39′32″N 96°28′44″W	Council Grove	Council Grove was named in 1825 when Government Survey Commissioners made treaties with Osage Indians which guaranteed safe passage for travelers on the Santa Fe Trail.
7	Council Grove Missouri, Kansas and Texas Depot	Council Grove Missouri, Kansas and Texas Depot	October 11, 2001 (#01001092)	512 E. Main St. 38°39′43″N 96°28′48″W	Council Grove	The Victorian style depot for the Missouri, Kansas & Texas Railway (also M-K-T or Katy) was built in 1894.
8	Council Grove National Bank	Council Grove National Bank	June 3, 1976 (#76000834)	130 W. Main; 38°39′41″N 96°29′24″W	Council Grove	Originally chartered in 1878 as the Morris County State Bank, in 1900 it received a national charter as the Council Grove National Bank. After a fire in 1886, the bank commissioned architect J. H. Leedy and builder Louis Peterson, both of Council Grove for a new building which was completed April 28, 1887.
9	Diamond Spring		September 30, 1976 (#76000835)	6 miles west of Wilsey; 38°36′58″N 96°45′44″W	Wilsey	
10	Dunlap Colored Cemetery	Dunlap Colored Cemetery	September 14, 2018 (#100002967)	2050 S 100 Rd. 38°35′15″N 96°21′12″W	Dunlap vicinity	
11	Farmers and Drovers Bank	Farmers and Drovers Bank	June 21, 1971 (#71000321)	201 and 203 W. Main St. 38°39′51″N 96°29′21″W	Council Grove	Originally just 201 W. Main; 203 W. Main added in boundary increase of February 19, 1982
12	First Baptist Church	First Baptist Church	July 28, 1995 (#95000915)	325 W. Main St. 38°39′35″N 96°29′34″W	Council Grove	
13	Four Mile Creek Lattice	Four Mile Creek Lattice	January 4, 1990 (#89002181)	Over Four Mile Creek, southeast of Wilsey; 38°36′33″N 96°39′21″W	Wilsey	
14	Furney Farm	Furney Farm	July 12, 2006 (#06000596)	649 E. US 56; 38°39′45″N 96°27′15″W	Council Grove	
15	Greenwood Cemetery	Greenwood Cemetery	February 3, 2020 (#100004926)	West Main St. 38°39′30″N 96°30′04″W	Council Grove	
16	Seth Hays House	Seth Hays House	September 25, 1975 (#75000718)	203 Wood St. 38°39′32″N 96°29′18″W	Council Grove	Seth Hays came to Council Grove in 1847, achieving success as merchant and later, owner of the Hays House tavern and hotel. The brick house, built in 1866-1867, was home for Seth Hays, his adopted daughter Kittie Parker Robbins Hays, and his housekeeper, a freed slave "Aunt Sallie" Taylor. The home is now a museum and contributing property to the Council Grove Historic District.
17	Herington Army Airfield Chapel	Herington Army Airfield Chapel	January 5, 2024 (#100009706)	106 Main Street; 38°44′20″N 96°50′46″W	Latimer	
18	Hermit's Cave on Belfry Hill	Hermit's Cave on Belfry Hill	April 14, 2015 (#15000148)	E. of N. Belfry St., generally from Columbia to Conn Sts. 38°39′44″N 96°29′39″W	Council Grove	
19	Jenkins Building	Jenkins Building	May 19, 2004 (#04000451)	101 W. Mackenzie St. 38°47′44″N 96°44′08″W	White City	
20	Last Chance Store	Last Chance Store	June 21, 1971 (#71000322)	500 W. Main St. 38°39′47″N 96°29′35″W	Council Grove	A contributing property to the Council Grove Historic District
21	Little John Creek Reserve	Little John Creek Reserve	October 21, 2001 (#01001125)	South of Council Grove around Little John Creek, E. 1/2, Sec. 29, T 16 S, R 9 E 38°37′38″N 96°25′43″W	Council Grove	From 1846 to 1873, the land was a reserve for the Kansa Indians. The reserve was, for a short period, childhood home to Charles Curtis, representative and senator from Kansas, and, later, Vice President of the United States.
22	Madonna of the Trail	Madonna of the Trail	March 26, 2018 (#100002245)	11 E. Main St. 38°39′43″N 96°29′13″W	Council Grove	
23	Old Kaw Mission	Old Kaw Mission	March 24, 1971 (#71000323)	500 N. Mission St. 38°39′57″N 96°29′38″W	Council Grove	
24	Simcock House	Simcock House	March 11, 1982 (#82004888)	206-208 Columbia St. 38°39′43″N 96°29′29″W	Council Grove	
25	Six Mile Creek Stage Station Historic District	Six Mile Creek Stage Station Historic District	May 11, 1995 (#95000585)	600 feet east of FAS Highway 468, 4¼ miles south of junction with U.S. Route 56; 38°36′20″N 96°51′16″W	Burdick	
26	US Post Office-Council Grove	US Post Office-Council Grove	October 17, 1989 (#89001636)	103 W. Main St. 38°39′39″N 96°29′16″W	Council Grove	
27	T.W. Whiting Residence		November 5, 2026 (#100013587)	605 Columbia St; 38°39′37″N 96°29′48″W	Council Grove	
28	William Young Archeological Site		February 24, 1971 (#71000324)	Address Restricted	Council Grove	

== See also ==
- List of National Historic Landmarks in Kansas
- National Register of Historic Places listings in Kansas
