= Simcock House =

Simcock House may refer to:

- Simcock House (Independence, Kansas), listed on the NRHP in Kansas
- Simcock House (Council Grove, Kansas), listed on the National Register of Historic Places in Morris County, Kansas
- Simcock House (Swansea, Massachusetts), listed on the NRHP in Bristol County, Massachusetts
