= Council Grove Downtown Historic District =

Historic district in Kansas, United States

- U.S. National Register of Historic Places
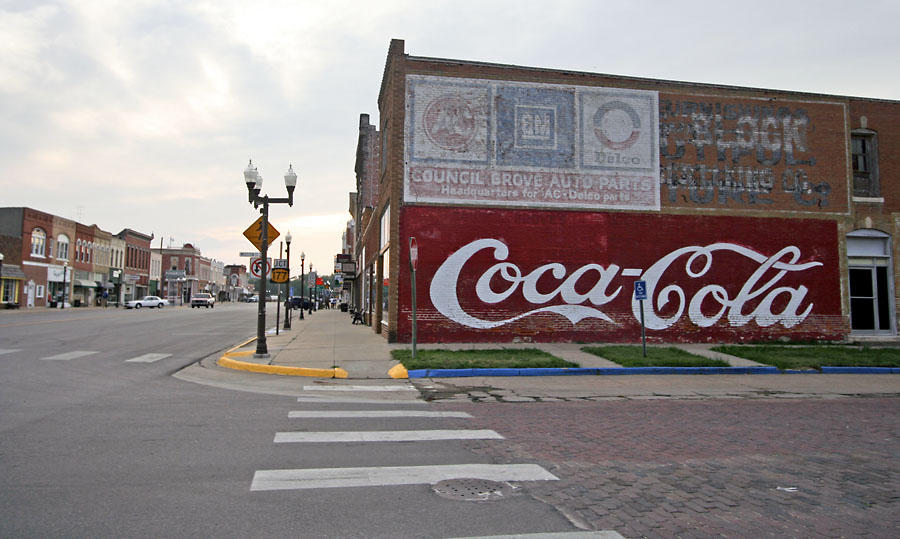

- Location within Kansas
- Location: Generally spanning from Neosho River to Belfry on W Main and extending N to Columbia between Neosho and Mission, Council Grove, Kansas
- Coordinates: 38.661111°N 96.492222°W
- Area: 25.8 acres (10.4 ha)
- Architect: Louis Simon, C.W. Squires
- Architectural style: Early Commercial, Late Victorian
- NRHP reference No.: 10000519
- Added to NRHP: July 30, 2010

The Council Grove Downtown Historic District is a 25.8 acres (10.4 ha) historic district which was listed on the National Register of Historic Places in 2010.

The historic district contains seventy-one buildings dating from the mid and late 19th and early 20th century. The earliest building is Conn Mercantile constructed in 1853 and used as a general store and way station for travelers on the Santa Fe Trail. Forty-three of the buildings were deemed contributing.

The district extends from the Neosho River on W. Main St. to Belfry St. and extends north to Columbia St. between Neosho and Mission Streets.

== See also ==
- Council Grove Historic District, the U.S. National Historic Landmark
