= Big John Farm Limestone Bank Barn =

- U.S. National Register of Historic Places
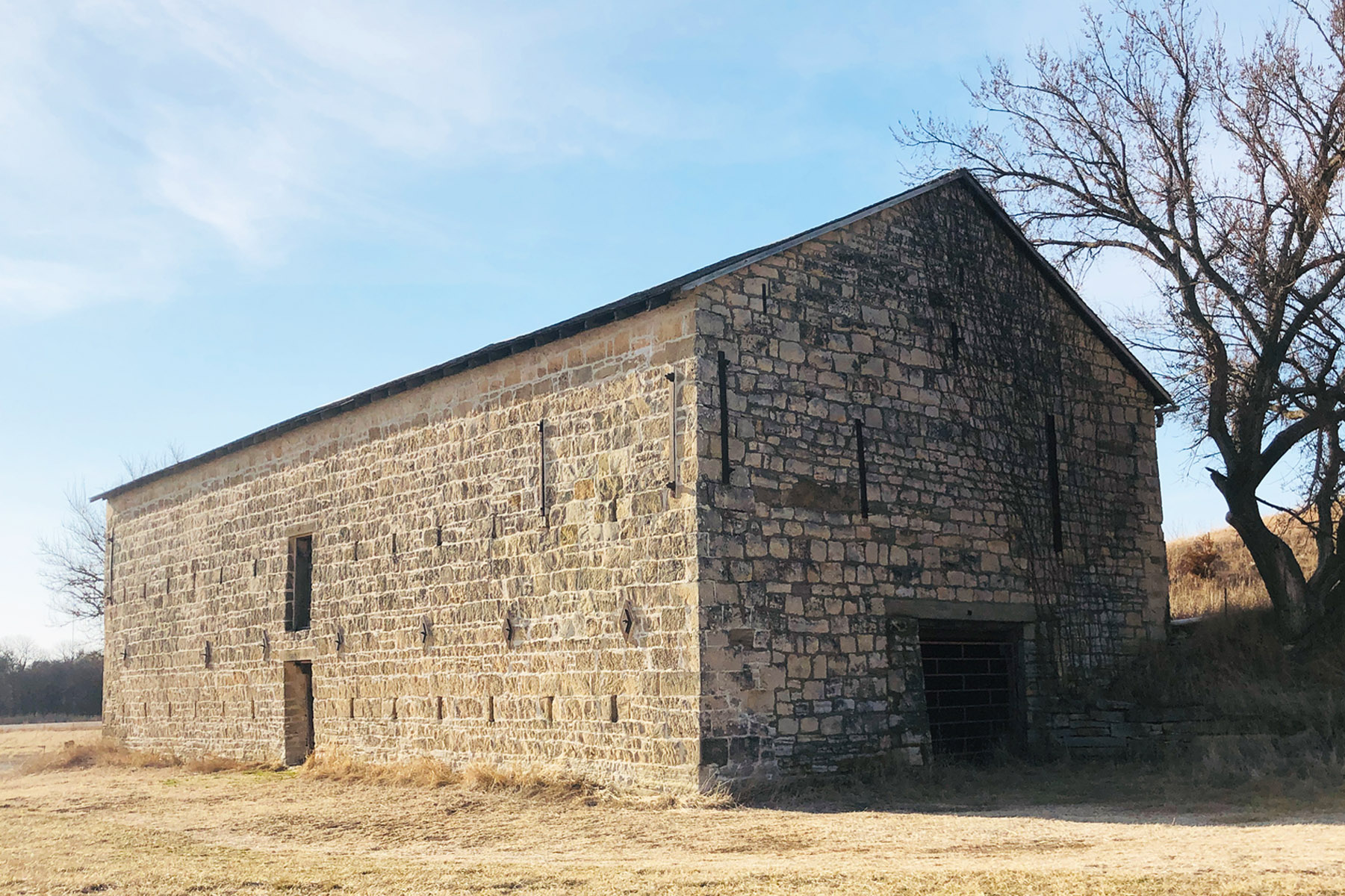
- Barn in 2021

- Location within Kansas
- Nearest city: Council Grove, Kansas
- Coordinates: 38.67015°N 96.44947°W
- Area: less than one acre
- Built: 1871
- Architectural style: Limestone bank barn
- NRHP reference No.: 90001576
- Added to NRHP: October 25, 1990

The Big John Farm Limestone Bank Barn, located north of U.S. Route 56 and east of Big John Creek in Council Grove, Morris County, Kansas, was listed on the National Register of Historic Places in 1990.

It is a bank barn, which is a barn built against a hillside and having entrances on two levels.

Built during 1871–1872, the limestone barn measures 76 by 40 feet (23 m × 12 m). The stone walls are 2 feet (0.61 m) thick. The roof is of a double truss design of native oak. The property, at one time, was owned by Seth Hays and it is likely he paid for its construction.

The farm was purchased by Morris County in 1877 for use as a poor farm, and it served as that until 1945.

At the time of the National Register listing in 1990, study was underway about how the barn could be restored and reused in some way; a grant had been received to hire an architect or engineer to address structural problems.

During 1992 to 2006, the barn's roof, windows, and drainpipes were replaced, and its walls were repaired.

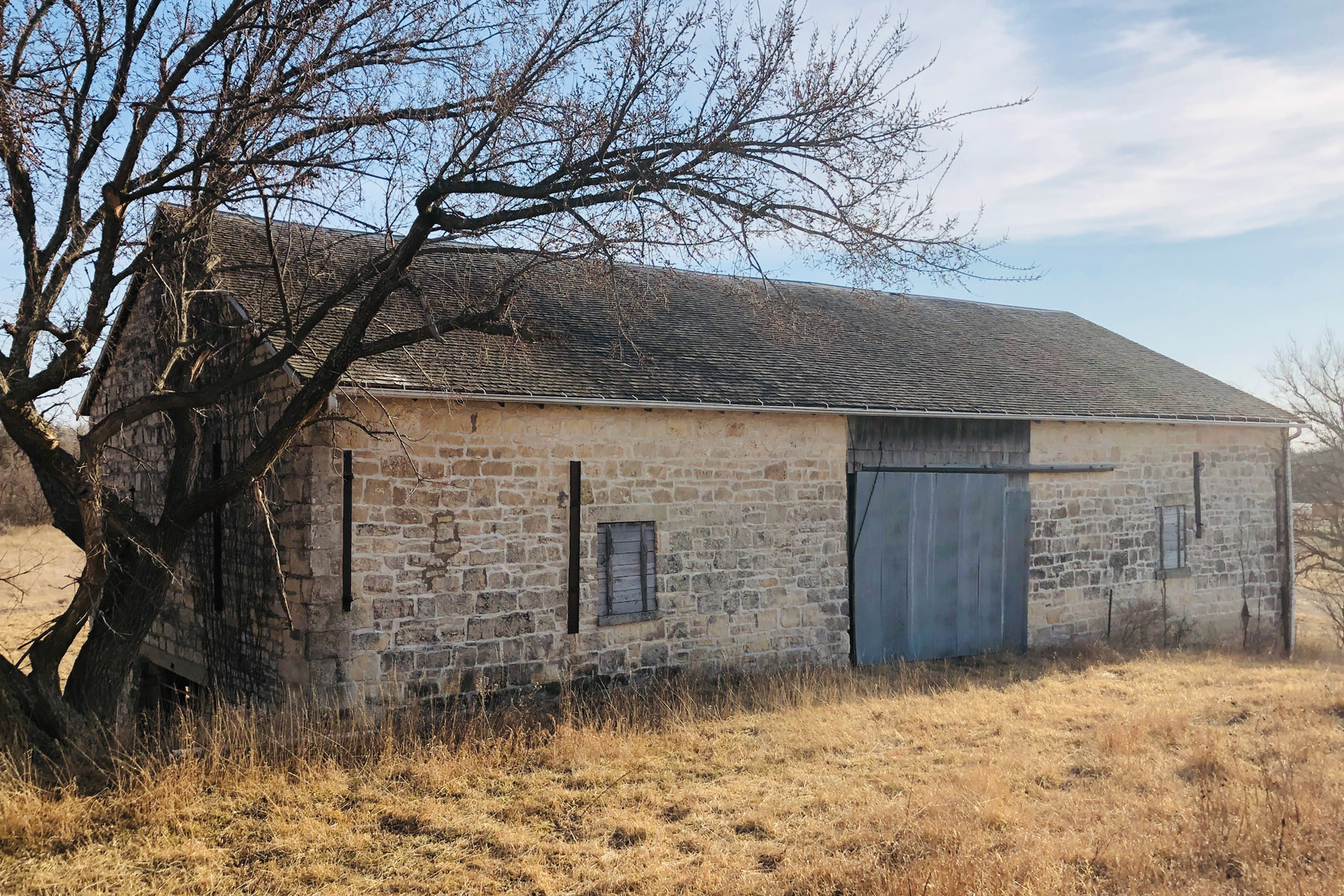
Back view of barn, from 2021

It is located behind (on the north side of) what the Morris County Fairgrounds is now. A sign on westbound Highway 56 indicates "OLD STONE BARN" at what is also an entrance to the Morris County Recycling Center and the Morris County Transfer Station. Big John Creek runs through the property.
