= Greenwood Cemetery (Council Grove, Kansas) =

Historic cemetery in Morris County, Kansas

- U.S. National Register of Historic Places
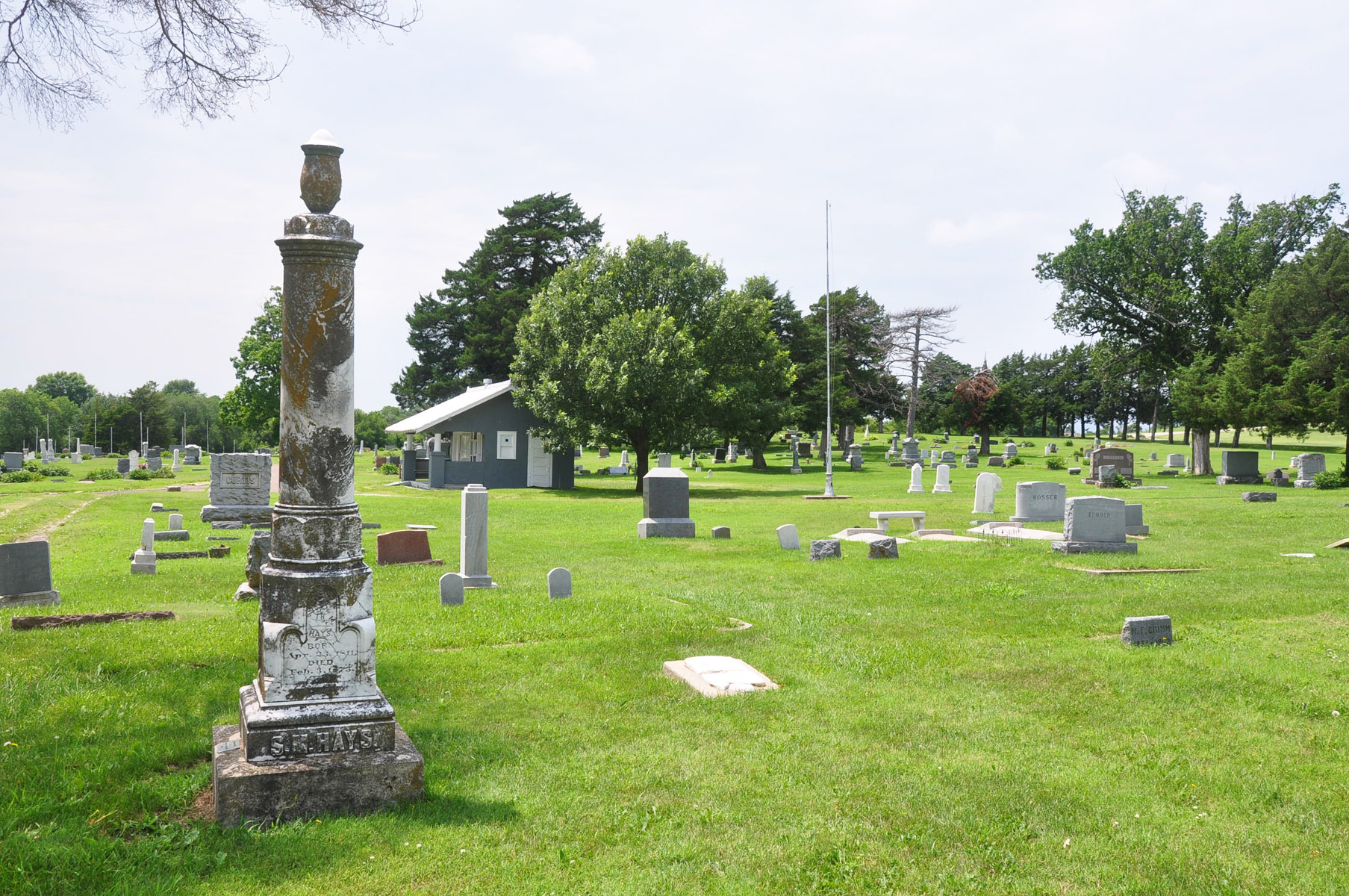

- Location within Kansas
- Location: West Main St., Council Grove, Kansas
- Coordinates: 38°39′30″N 96°30′04″W
- Built: 1862
- NRHP reference No.: 100004926
- Added to NRHP: February 3, 2020

Greenwood Cemetery is a historic cemetery on West Main Street in Council Grove, Kansas. The cemetery opened in 1862; before then, all burials in Council Grove took place at the Kaw Mission's graveyard. A number of bodies were moved from the graveyard to the new cemetery once it opened. The local chapter of the Independent Order of Odd Fellows began managing the cemetery in 1870; the group platted the cemetery grounds and built a stone wall around it, the south side of which still stands. The Council Grove city government took over cemetery operations in 1911 and built the Shelter House, the cemetery's only building, in 1922. The city expanded the cemetery grounds in 1923 and 1945; in 1990, when all available plots had been sold, they opened a new cemetery. Most of Council Grove's early settlers and civic leaders are buried at Greenwood Cemetery, including Seth M. Hays, the city's first white settler.

The cemetery was added to the National Register of Historic Places on February 3, 2020.
