= Council Grove Historic District =

Historic district in Kansas, United States

- U.S. National Register of Historic Places
- U.S. National Historic Landmark District
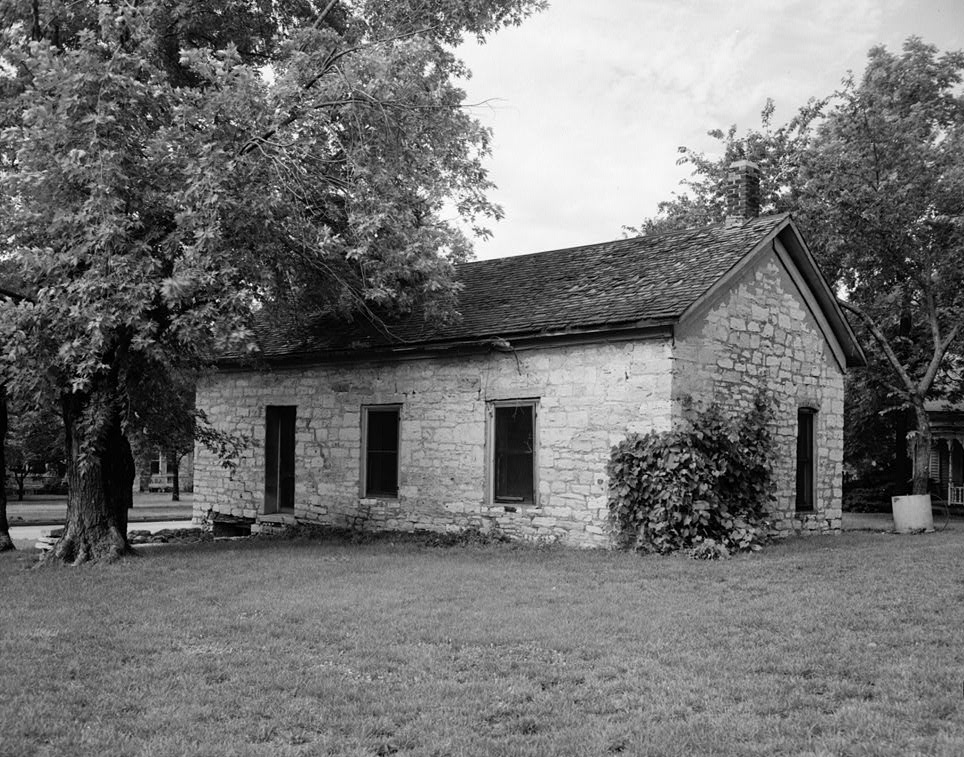
- Last Chance Store, a part of the district

- Location within Kansas Location within the United States
- Location: U.S. 56 and other areas, Council Grove, Kansas
- Coordinates: 38°39′32″N 96°28′44″W
- Built: 1825
- NRHP reference No.: 66000347

Significant dates
- Added to NRHP: October 15, 1966
- Designated NHLD: May 23, 1963

The Council Grove Historic District is a National Historic Landmark District located in Council Grove, Kansas, United States. It consists of six discontiguous areas in the city important in the history of the Santa Fe Trail and American migration to the west in the 19th century. Council Grove was named for the occasion of an 1825 treaty negotiation between the Osage Indians and the US Federal government which guaranteed the Santa Fe caravans safe passage through Osage territory. The landmark was designated in 1963.

== Trees ==
The area that is now Council Grove was a natural stopping point for westward migrants on the Santa Fe Trail, since it had plentiful water, and was the last adequate source of lumber (needed for maintenance of wagons). It was, however, in territory controlled by the Osage people. Delegates of the United States government met with Osage leaders, and signed an agreement guaranteeing safe passage through Osage territory to migrants. The site of this meeting was in what is now a small park at the center of Council Grove, under a large oak tree. That tree was felled by a storm in 1958, but its stump has been preserved and had a shelter built over it, and is one of the principal features of the district. A second tree, located on the north side of East Main Street just east of the Madonna of the Grove, was believed to be over 300 years old at the time of the landmark designation; it has also succumbed to the elements, with a sheltered tree section set in front of an old stone house.

== Trail section ==
The exact route of the Santa Fe Trail between Council Grove and points east varied over time, and was channeled onto Main Street when the city was platted. A relatively undisturbed section of wagon ruts dating to the period of migration were found about 1 mile (1.6 km) east of downtown Council Grove.

== Historic buildings ==
Three buildings dating to the historic period of migration by wagon are also included in the district. The Seth Hays House, located at the southwest corner of Hall and Wood Streets, is a single-story brick house, built about 1855 by Seth Hays, the first white settler in Morris County. Hays's first home was a log cabin on Main Street, which he replaced with the Hays Tavern in 1857, in order to better serve the caravans passing through. The Last Chance Store, located at Main and Chautauqua Streets, is a stone commercial establishment built in 1857. At that time it was on the western outskirts of the community, and was the last retail establishment serving caravans. It was designated an NHL in 1963.

== See also ==
- List of National Historic Landmarks in Kansas
- National Register of Historic Places listings in Morris County, Kansas
