= Council Grove National Bank =

- U.S. National Register of Historic Places
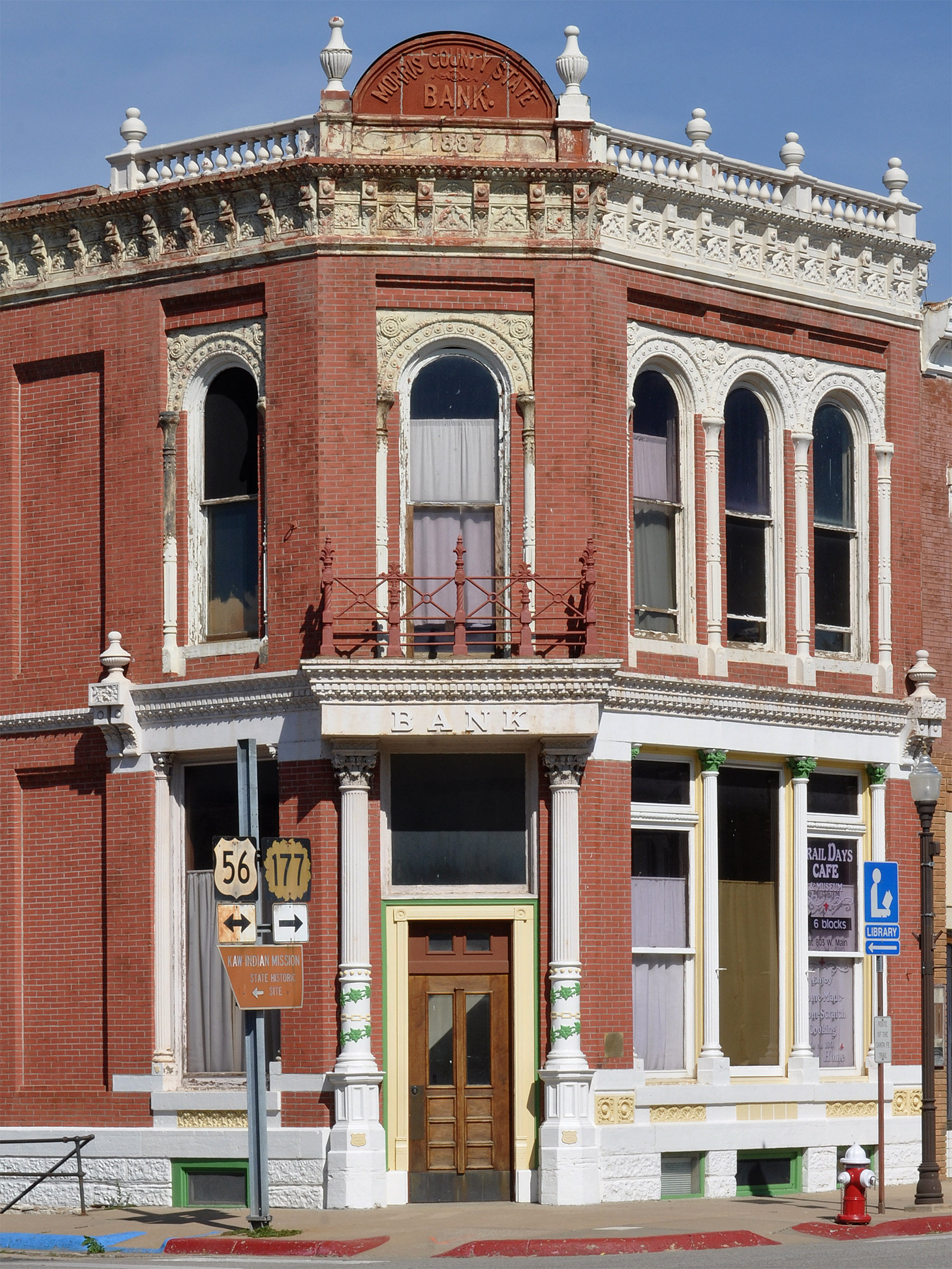

- Location within Kansas
- Location: 130 W. Main St., Council Grove, Kansas
- Coordinates: 38°39′41″N 96°29′24″W
- Area: 1 acre (0.40 ha)
- Built: 1887
- Built by: Louis Peterson
- Architect: J. H. Leedy
- Architectural style: Italianate
- NRHP reference No.: 76000834
- Added to NRHP: June 3, 1976

The Council Grove National Bank is a historic bank building at 130 W. Main Street in Council Grove, Kansas. It was built in 1887 for the Morris County State Bank, which was chartered in 1878 and lost its first building to a fire in 1886. Local architect J. H. Leedy designed the Italianate building, and Louis Peterson led its construction. The bank's design includes an entablature above the first-floor windows, Corinthian columns flanking the corner entrance, a bracketed entablature at the roof line, and a balustrade along the roof broken by a plaque above the entrance. The bank changed its name to the Council Grove National Bank when it was chartered nationally in 1900. The bank continued to use the building until it was damaged by a fire in 1978.

The building was added to the National Register of Historic Places on June 3, 1976.
