= Farmers and Drovers Bank =

- U.S. National Register of Historic Places
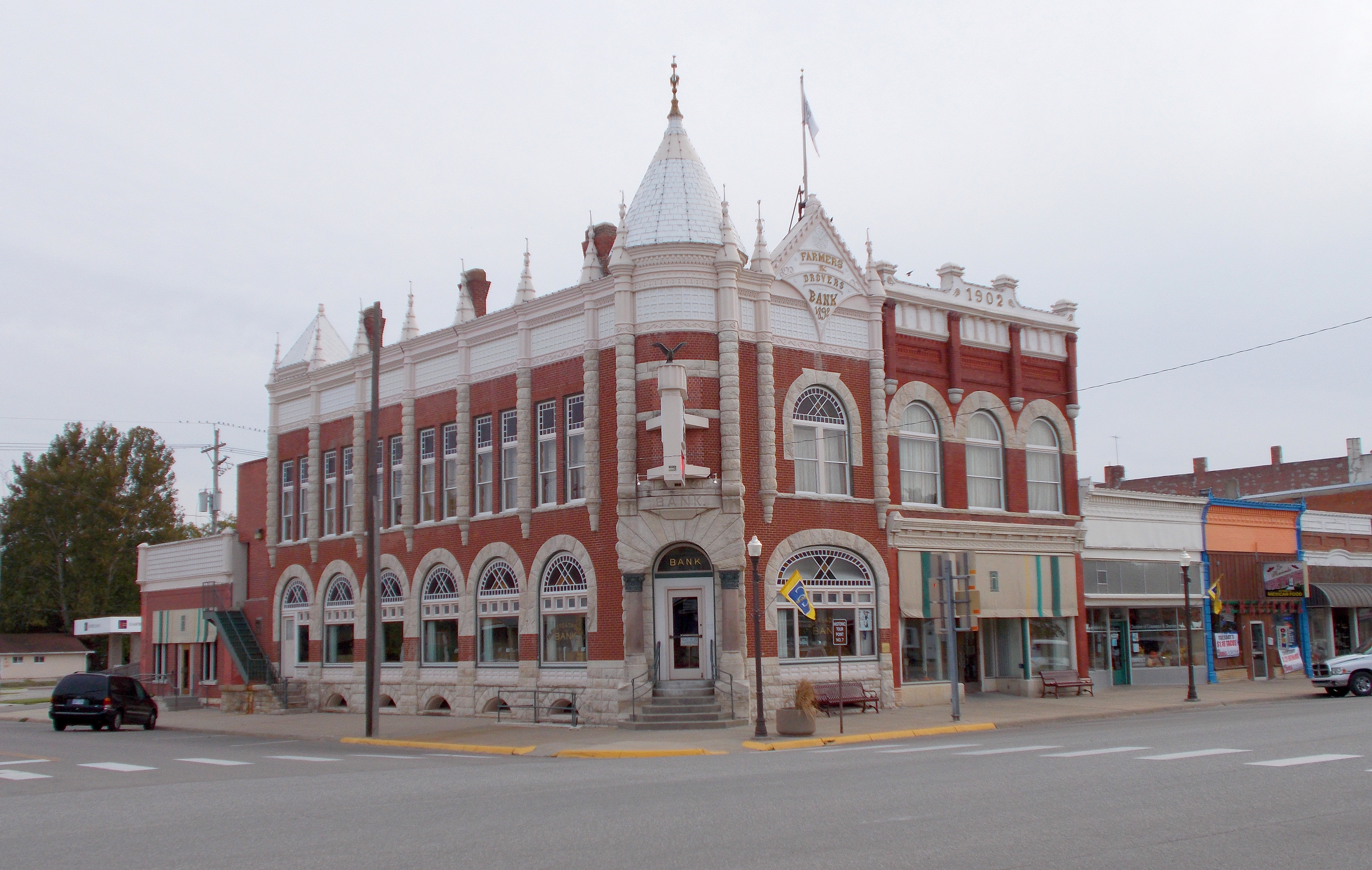

- Location within Kansas
- Location: 201 W. Main St., Council Grove, Kansas
- Coordinates: 38°39′51″N 96°29′21″W
- Area: less than one acre
- Built: 1892
- Architectural style: Victorian
- NRHP reference No.: 71000321
- Added to NRHP: June 21, 1971

The Farmers and Drovers Bank is a historic bank building located at 201 W. Main Street in Council Grove, Kansas. Constructed in 1892 by local contractors, the bank officially opened to customers in early 1893. Its Victorian-style design exemplifies the "commercial palace" architectural trend, characterized by bold, eclectic features intended to convey wealth and prosperity.

The building's notable design elements include a red brick exterior adorned with limestone arched windows, a turret above the front corner, and a limestone cornice divided by pinnacles. In 1902, the neighboring Indicator Building was constructed as an addition to the bank, designed to complement its architecture. The bank leased this space to local businesses, and the building's name originates from its first tenant, a general store called The Indicator. However, the store only operated for a year before closing due to a flood and subsequent fire.

The Farmers and Drovers Bank, along with the Indicator Building, was added to the National Register of Historic Places on June 21, 1971.

== The Farmers and Drovers Bank ==
Fifth-generation member of the Bank's ownership family, Michelle Bowman, held a senior role at the Bank for more than six years before appointment as Kansas banking commissioner in 2017, then appointment in 2018 to fill the community bank seat on the Federal Reserve Board that was created by Congress during the Obama administration and further appointments thereafter on the FRB with a term ending in 2034 and the position on the board of vice chair for supervision for a term ending in 2029.
