= Last Chance Store =

- U.S. National Register of Historic Places
- U.S. National Historic Landmark District – Contributing property
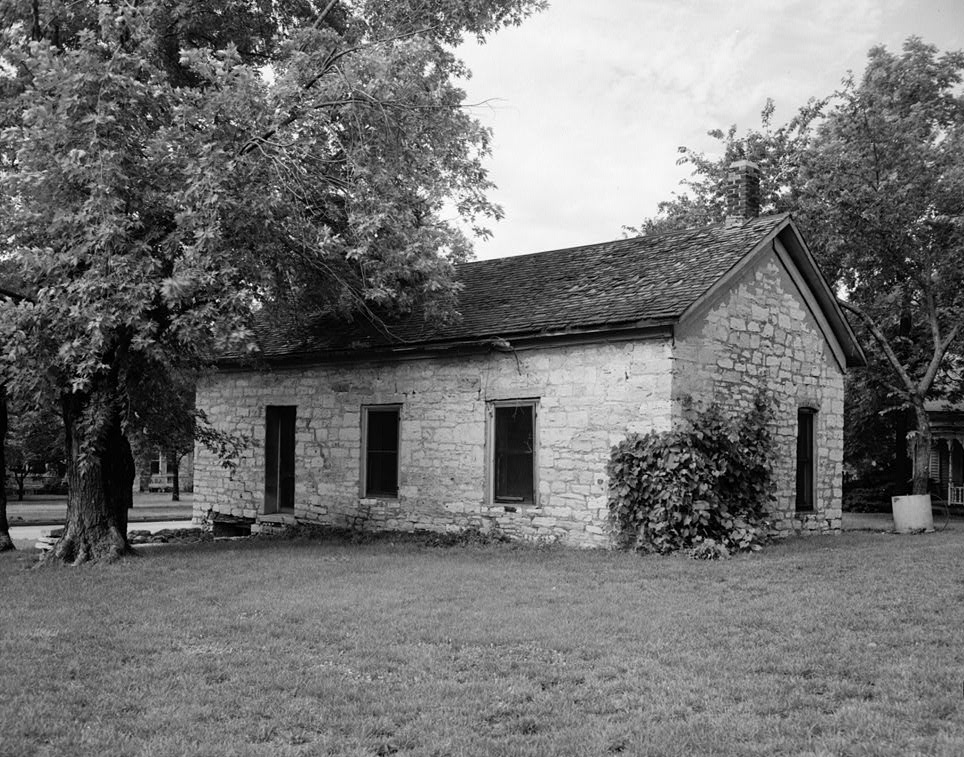
- Last Chance Store in 1958

- Location within Kansas Location within the United States
- Location: 500 W. Main St., Council Grove, Kansas
- Coordinates: 38°39′47″N 96°29′35″W
- Area: 1 acre (0.40 ha)
- Built: 1857
- Architectural style: Frontier/Plains Vernacular
- Part of: Council Grove Historic District (ID66000347)
- NRHP reference No.: 71000322

Significant dates
- Added to NRHP: June 21, 1971
- Designated NHLDCP: May 23, 1963

The Last Chance Store was built in 1857 along the Santa Fe Trail at Council Grove, Kansas. Located where the trail crossed the Neosho River, it was the last store in the settlement before the river. It was operated by Tom Hill as a trading post, as well as a post office and a polling place. The structure is constructed of local limestone, irregularly course, with a gable room and some quoining at the corners. The building marks a transition from the Frontier style of construction to the Prairie Vernacular style.

It was placed on the National Register of Historic Places on June 21, 1971. The store contributes to the National Historic Landmark Council Grove Historic District.
