= William Young Site =

- William Young Archeological Site
- U.S. National Register of Historic Places
- Nearest city: Council Grove, Kansas
- Area: 3 acres (1.2 ha)
- NRHP reference No.: 71000324
- Added to NRHP: February 24, 1971

The William Young Site is an archaeological site in Morris County, Kansas, near the city of Council Grove. The site was inhabited between 3550 and 3050 BC and initially excavated in 1962. A drought in North America led most humans to abandon the Great Plains during this period, and the site provides evidence that some humans remained in the area. It became the basis of what archaeologists named the Munkers Creek phase, a period of human habitation in the Flint Hills region marked by its stone tools. Artifacts recovered from the William Young Site include distinctive triangular stone gouges and a clay effigy head, the oldest clay artifact found in Kansas.

The site was listed on the National Register of Historic Places on February 24, 1971.
