= United States Post Office (Council Grove, Kansas) =

- US Post Office–Council Grove
- U.S. National Register of Historic Places
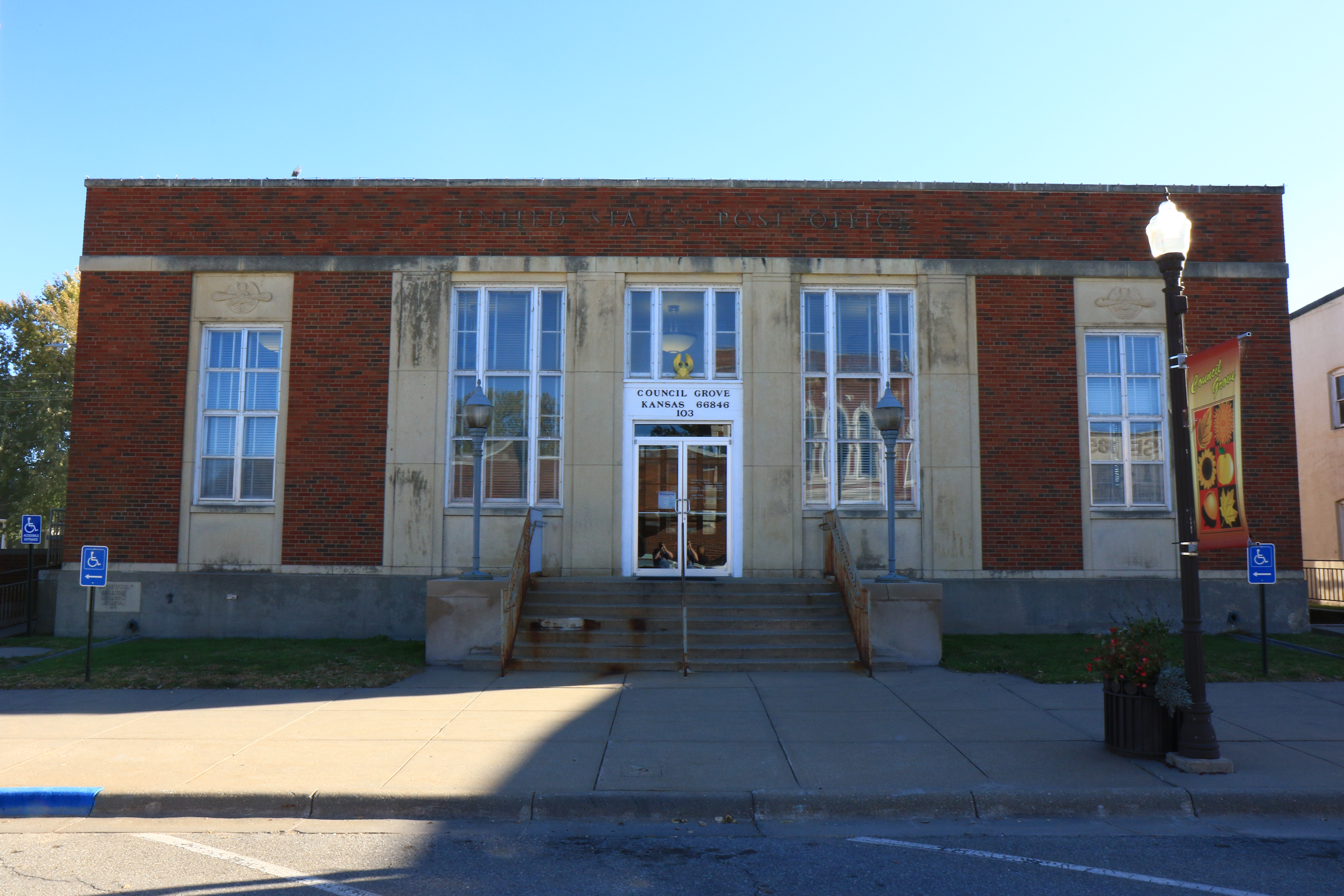

- Location within Kansas
- Location: 103 W. Main St., Council Grove, Kansas
- Coordinates: 38°39′39″N 96°29′16″W
- Area: less than one acre
- Built: 1938-39
- Architect: Louis A. Simon
- Architectural style: Classical Revival
- MPS: Kansas Post Offices with Artwork, 1936--1942 MPS
- NRHP reference No.: 89001636
- Added to NRHP: October 17, 1989

The United States Post Office at 103 W. Main Street is the main post office in Council Grove, Kansas. The post office was built in 1938-39 according to a Neoclassical design credited to Supervising Architect Louis A. Simon. It includes a mural, "Autumn Colors", by artist Charles B. Rogers, which was painted in 1941 as part of the New Deal post office mural program. Rogers was a student at Bethany College who earned the commission for the Council Grove post office after entering a contest to paint a mural in the St. Louis, Missouri post office; he was a self-taught artist who had little exposure to art in his youth. The oil on canvas mural portrays a Flint Hills farm scene in autumn and is typical of the illustrative realism style commonly seen in the post office murals.

The post office was listed on the National Register of Historic Places on October 17, 1989.
