= Little John Creek Reserve =

- U.S. National Register of Historic Places
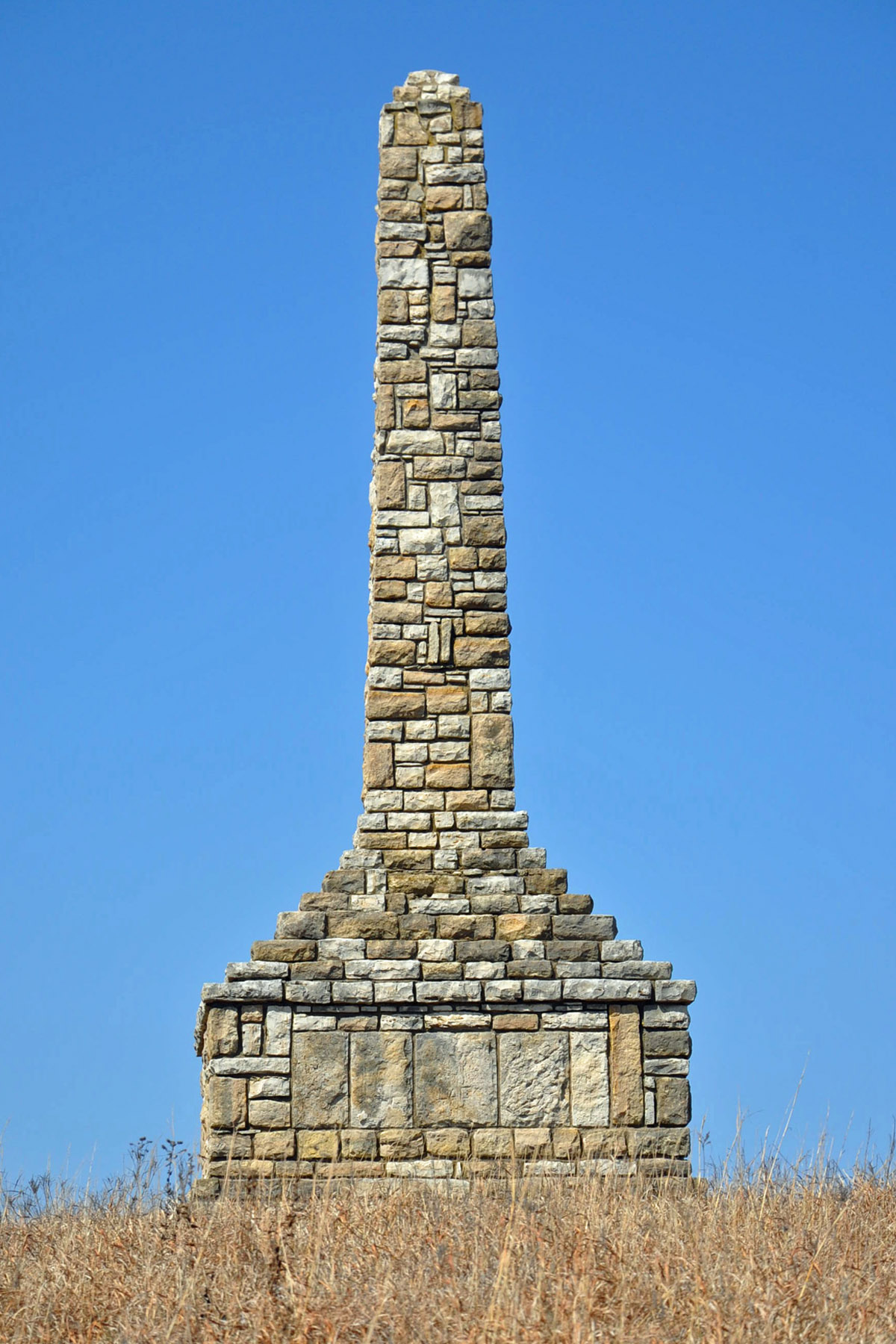
- Monument to the Unknown Kanza Warrior

- Location within Kansas
- Location: South of Council Grove around Little John Creek, E. 1/2, Sec. 29, T 16 S, R 9 E
- Coordinates: 38°37′38″N 96°25′43″W
- Area: 152.9 acres (61.9 ha)
- NRHP reference No.: 01001125
- Added to NRHP: October 21, 2001

The Little John Creek Reserve, located south of Council Grove, Kansas, is a former American Indian reservation that was the last home of the Kaw people in Kansas. The Kaw, then known as the Kanza, relocated to the reservation following an 1846 treaty in which they exchanged the land for their settlements on the Missouri River. The tribe remained on the land until 1873, when white pressure forced them to relocate to the Indian Territory.

The reservation includes the former Kaw Agency Building and a group of stone houses built by the U.S. Government in the early 1860s. The houses were part of an unsuccessful attempt by the government to impose white values of land ownership and domesticity upon the tribe. The Kanza largely kept to their traditional leather and hide housing, as the stone houses were susceptible to theft, could not be moved during flooding or hunting seasons, and ignored the traditional Kanza belief that square corners attracted bad spirits. They mainly used the stone houses to shelter animals, and the buildings only became houses after white settlers occupied the land. The reservation also includes the Monument to the Unknown Kanza Warrior, a 40-foot (12 m) stone marker erected in 1925. The monument was built by property owner Frank Haucke and the Council Grove American Legion, and the remains of a Kanza warrior Haucke found on the property are buried below it.

U.S. Vice President Charles Curtis, who was a member of the Kaw tribe, lived on the reservation from 1863 to 1868. During a raid on the reservation by the Cheyenne in 1868, the nine-year-old Curtis allegedly walked from Council Grove to Topeka to warn of the attack. He frequently recounted the story to establish his political career, which included terms in the U.S. House of Representatives and U.S. Senate prior to his vice presidency. The battles between the Kaw and Cheyenne led the government to curtail the tribe's annual buffalo hunts, which played a role in their weakening and eventual removal from Kansas.

After a period of white settlement, the property was neglected from 1930 through the end of the twentieth century. The Kaw Nation purchased the land in 2000. The reservation was listed on the National Register of Historic Places on October 21, 2001.

== See also ==
- Indian Land Cessions in the United States
