= Cottage House Hotel =

- U.S. National Register of Historic Places
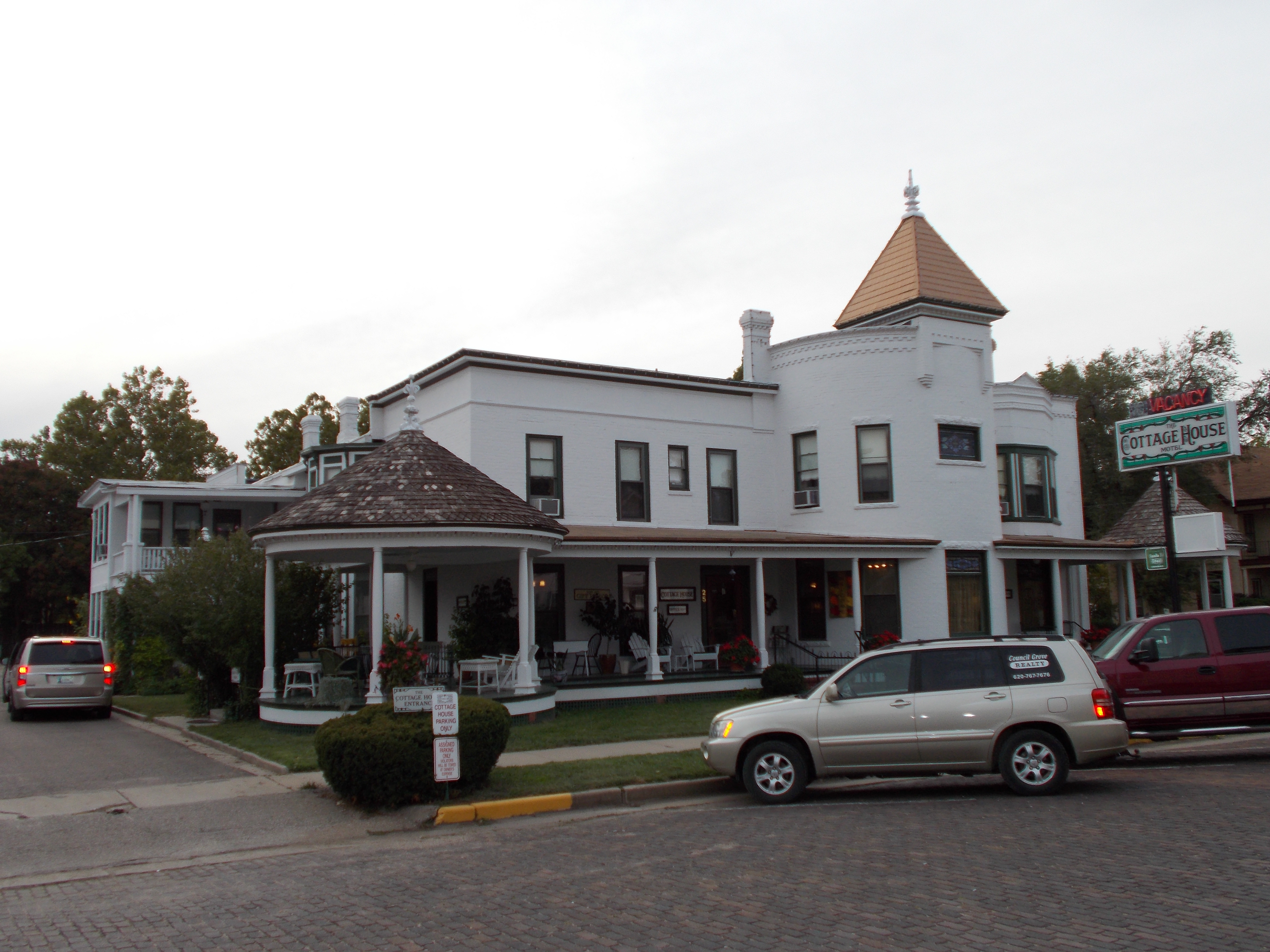
- The Cottage House Hotel in 2012

- Location within Kansas
- Location: 25 N. Neosho St., Council Grove, Kansas
- Coordinates: 38°39′42″N 96°29′23″W
- Area: Less than one acre
- Built: 1871–72
- Built by: Joe Axe, Marion Scholes, E. Pattison
- Architectural style: Italianate, Queen Anne
- NRHP reference No.: 88001172
- Added to NRHP: August 4, 1988

The Cottage House Hotel is a historic hotel at 25 N. Neosho Street in Council Grove, Kansas. The original hotel was built in 1871–72 around a small house built in 1867; the two-story Italianate hotel was originally a boarding house with a small number of renters. Banker Lewis Mead and his first wife Sarah Marks Mead bought the hotel in 1879; after Sarah died in 1886, Lewis remarried her sister Josephine, who was responsible for enlarging and promoting the hotel. The hotel under Josephine's management was known as a popular destination for businessmen and salesmen, including many of Lewis' business associates; it did not advertise to the traveling public, and it earned a reputation for feeling welcoming and more like a private home than a commercial business. Many members of the large Marks family also lived in or near the hotel. The hotel expanded several times to fit its growing clientele; its 1898 addition is notable for its Queen Anne design with a square tower on the roof. Josephine Marks Mead operated the hotel until her death in 1932; the building has passed through several owners since then, though it has mostly remained an operating hotel.

The hotel was added to the National Register of Historic Places on August 4, 1988.
