= First Baptist Church of Council Grove =

Historic church in Kansas, United States

- First Baptist Church
- U.S. National Register of Historic Places
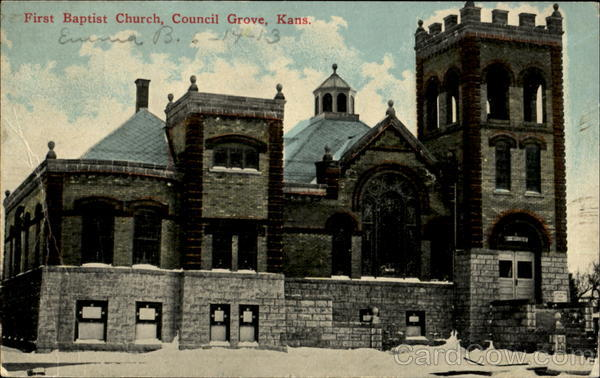
- 1913 postcard

- Location within Kansas Location within the United States
- Location: 325 West Main Street; Council Grove, Kansas
- Coordinates: 38.6601°N 96.4929°W
- Built: 1909
- Architectural style: Romanesque Revival, Gothic Revival
- NRHP reference No.: 95000915
- Added to NRHP: July 28, 1995

The First Baptist Church of Council Grove, Kansas is a historic Baptist church. Its historic building at 325 West Main Street was listed on the National Register of Historic Places in 1995.

== Building ==
It is a one-story limestone and brick church. The historic building at 325 West Main Street was constructed for the congregation of the First Baptist Church of Council Grove in 1909. The church building features Romanesque Revival and Gothic Revival elements.

== Congregation ==
The congregation of the First Baptist Church of Council was organized on Dec. 3, 1870. It was located on Main street for many decades and moved to Country Lane in 1993, with the dedication of the new building on April 17, 1994. The First Baptist congregation currently meets at 501 Country Lane in Council Grove.
