= Furney Farm =

- U.S. National Register of Historic Places
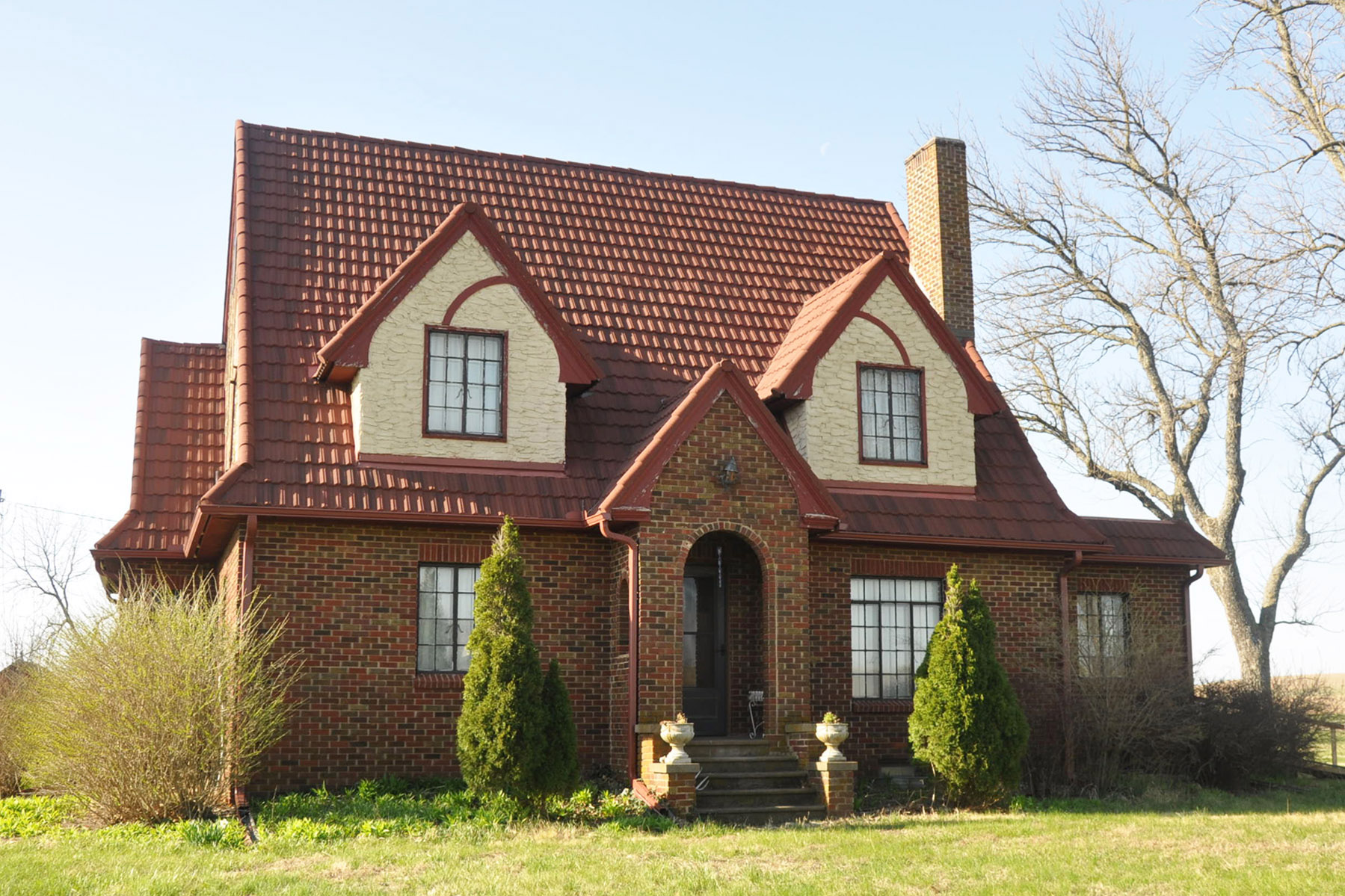
- The Furney Farmhouse

- Location within Kansas
- Location: 649 E. US 56, Council Grove, Kansas
- Coordinates: 38°39′45″N 96°27′15″W
- Area: 286.1 acres (115.8 ha)
- Built: 1925-26
- Architect: Walter G. Ward
- Architectural style: Tudor Revival
- NRHP reference No.: 06000596
- Added to NRHP: July 12, 2006

The Furney Farm is a historic farm at 649 E. U.S. Highway 56 east of Council Grove, Kansas. The property became a farm in 1862, when Carlos G. and Kate Akin were granted its patent; prior to that, it was the site of Fremont Spring, a stopping place on the Santa Fe Trail. After it passed through several owners, Grant Furney bought the farm in 1921 and settled there with his family. Furney built the farm's Tudor Revival farmhouse in 1925–26; while the style was popular in the early twentieth century, it was not commonly used on farms. Designed by Kansas State Agricultural College architect Walter G. Ward, the farmhouse features a projecting front entrance with a gabled portico, two gabled dormers with stucco exteriors and one curved half-timber each, and a steep shingled gable roof. The property also includes a historic barn with a gambrel roof and hay hood, five modern outbuildings, wagon ruts from the Santa Fe Trail, and the remains of Fremont Spring, which was mostly paved over during the construction of US 56.

The farm was added to the National Register of Historic Places on July 12, 2006.
