= Council Grove station =

- Council Grove Missouri, Kansas and Texas Depot
- U.S. National Register of Historic Places
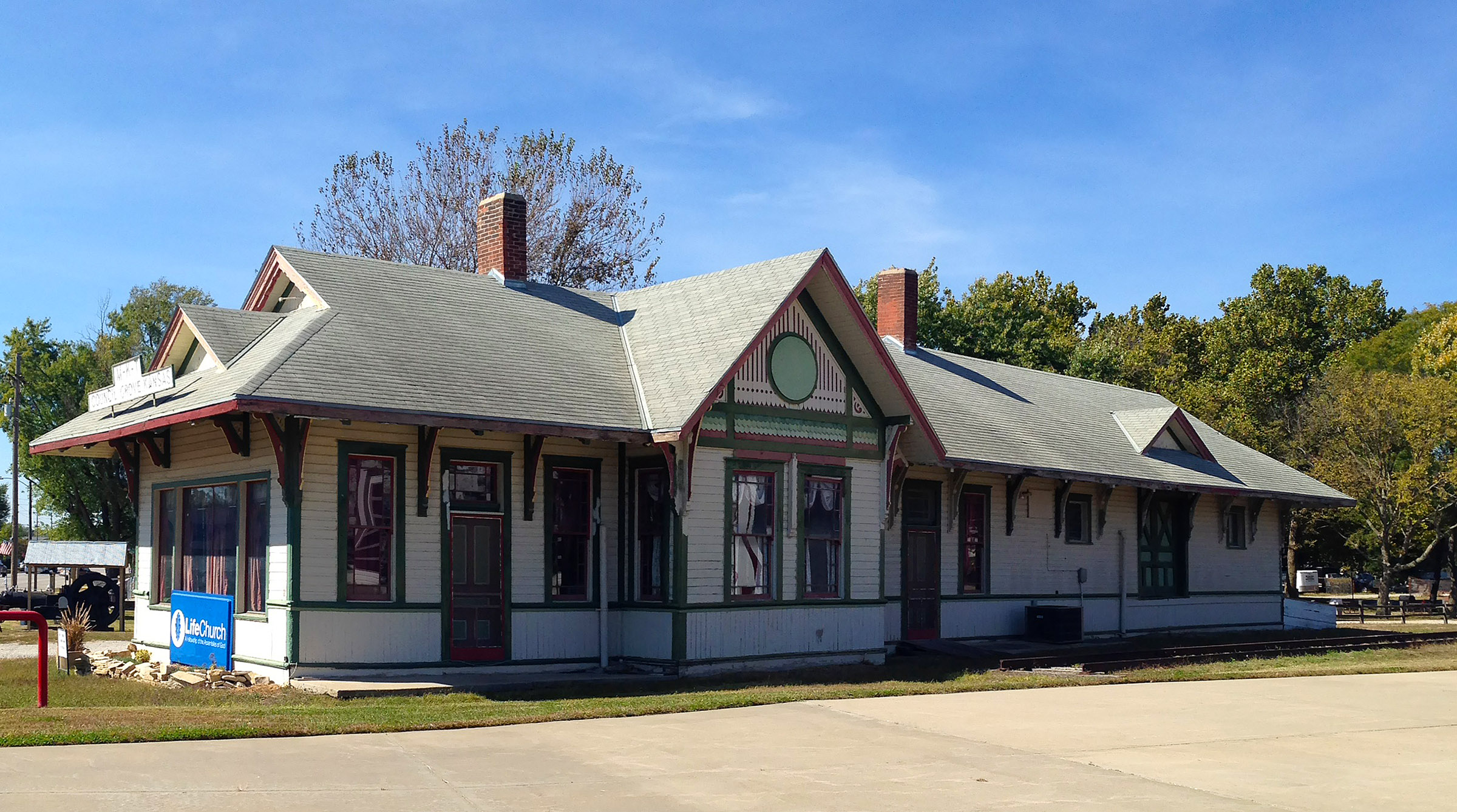

- Location within Kansas
- Location: 512 E. Main St., Council Grove, Kansas
- Coordinates: 38°39′43″N 96°28′48″W
- Area: less than one acre
- Built: December 31, 1894
- Built by: Missouri, Kansas & Texas RR Co.
- Architectural style: Victorian
- MPS: Railroad Resources of Kansas MPS
- NRHP reference No.: 01001092
- Added to NRHP: October 11, 2001

The Council Grove Missouri, Kansas and Texas Depot is a former Missouri–Kansas–Texas Railroad (MKT) station at 512 E. Main Street in Council Grove, Kansas. The station opened on December 31, 1894, to replace the previous station, a utilitarian building which opened with the MKT line through Council Grove in 1869 and had burned down on May 18 of that year. The wooden building has a Victorian design that features ornamental siding and brackets along the roof. The station served both freight and passenger traffic; the former included cattle, local agricultural products, and American Express mail. Trains served the station until 1957, when the MKT ended service along the line through Council Grove. The station is one of eleven surviving MKT stations in Kansas, and it is the only one not to have been relocated.

The station was added to the National Register of Historic Places on October 11, 2001.

Preceding station	Missouri–Kansas–Texas Railroad	Following station
Parkerville toward Junction City	Junction City – Joplin	Dunlap toward Joplin
