= Oscar Carlson House =

- U.S. National Register of Historic Places
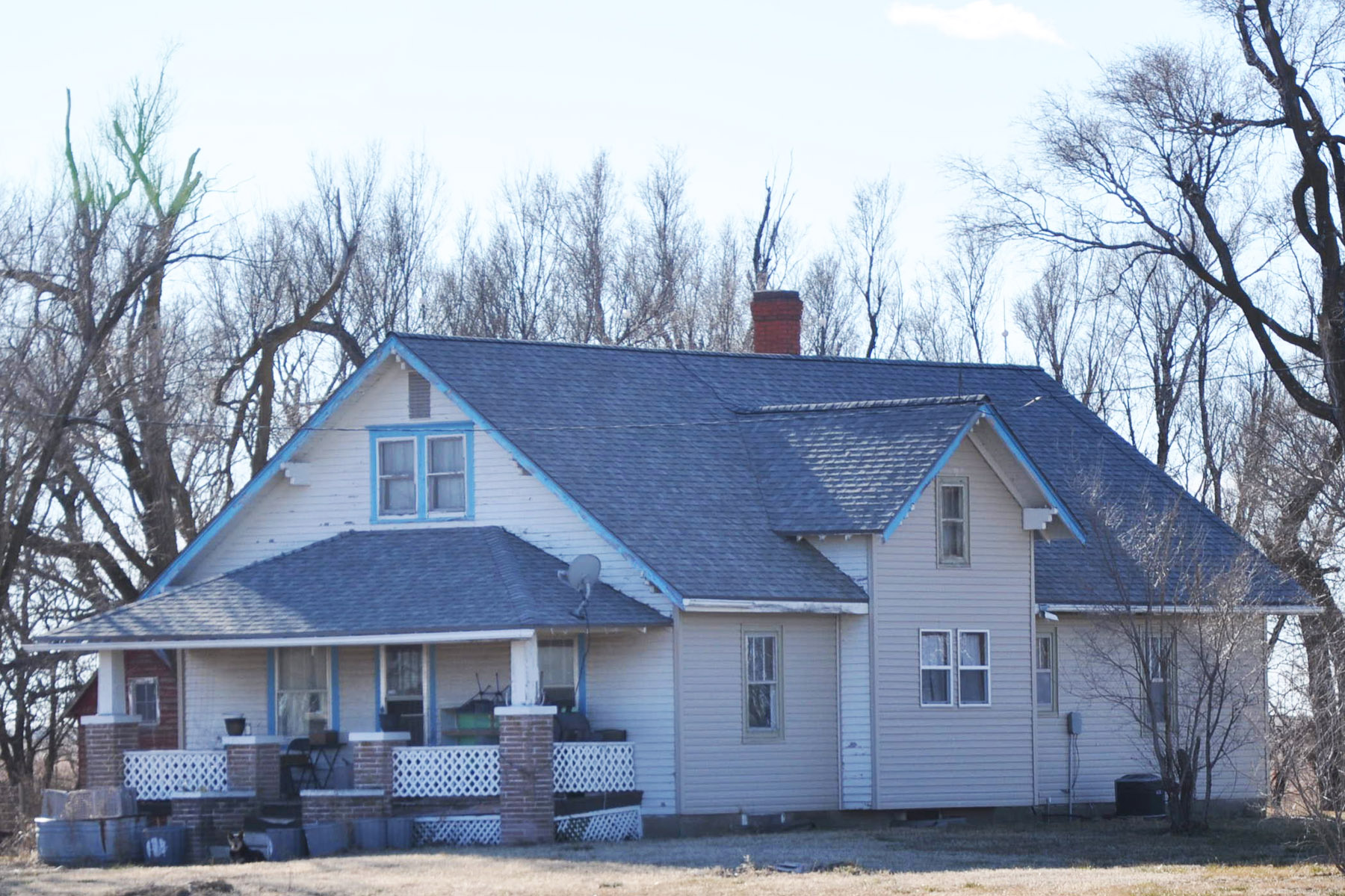

- Location within Kansas
- Nearest city: Burdick, Kansas
- Coordinates: 38°32′11″N 96°52′53″W
- Area: less than one acre
- Built: 1930
- Built by: Swen Johnson
- Architectural style: Bungalow
- NRHP reference No.: 00000533
- Added to NRHP: May 26, 2000

The Oscar Carlson House is a historic house in rural Morris County, Kansas, southwest of the community of Burdick. Carpenter Swen Johnson built the house for Oscar and Anna Carlson in 1930; Anna contributed several pieces of the design. The one-and-a-half story house has a bungalow design with a gable roof, projecting cross gabled bays, and a full-width front porch, all typical elements of the style. The house included technology that was considered modern for the time, including a windmill-powered running water system and electric wiring; the latter could not be used until 1944, when electric lines reached the area. Anna's plan for the basement included a laundry room with a washing machine, a stove for cooking and heating laundry water, and chutes for laundry, garbage, and dust. As of 2000, the Carlson family's descendants still owned and lived in the house.

The house was added to the National Register of Historic Places on May 26, 2000.
