= Diamond Spring (Wilsey, Kansas) =

Spring in Kansas, U.S.

- U.S. National Register of Historic Places
- Location within Kansas
- Nearest city: Wilsey, Kansas
- Coordinates: 38°36′58″N 96°45′44″W
- Area: 5 acres (2.0 ha)
- NRHP reference No.: 76000835
- Added to NRHP: September 30, 1976

Diamond Spring is a natural spring in western Morris County, Kansas, which served as a stopping point on the Santa Fe Trail. A hunter named Old Ben Jones found the spring during the U.S. government's survey of the trail route in 1825. The survey commissioners named the site "The Diamond of the Plain" after a similarly named oasis in the Arabian Desert, though the name was typically shortened to Diamond Spring by travelers. In addition to water, the site had plentiful grass and shade trees, making it a popular campground; all recorded trail guides from the era included the spring, and it was frequently described in journals kept by travelers on the trail. A stagecoach station and a store, both of which are no longer standing, were built at the site later in the nineteenth century. An irrigation system linking the spring to a nearby ranch still remains at the site, though it is no longer usable.

The spring was added to the National Register of Historic Places on September 30, 1976.
