= Seth Hays House =

- U.S. National Register of Historic Places
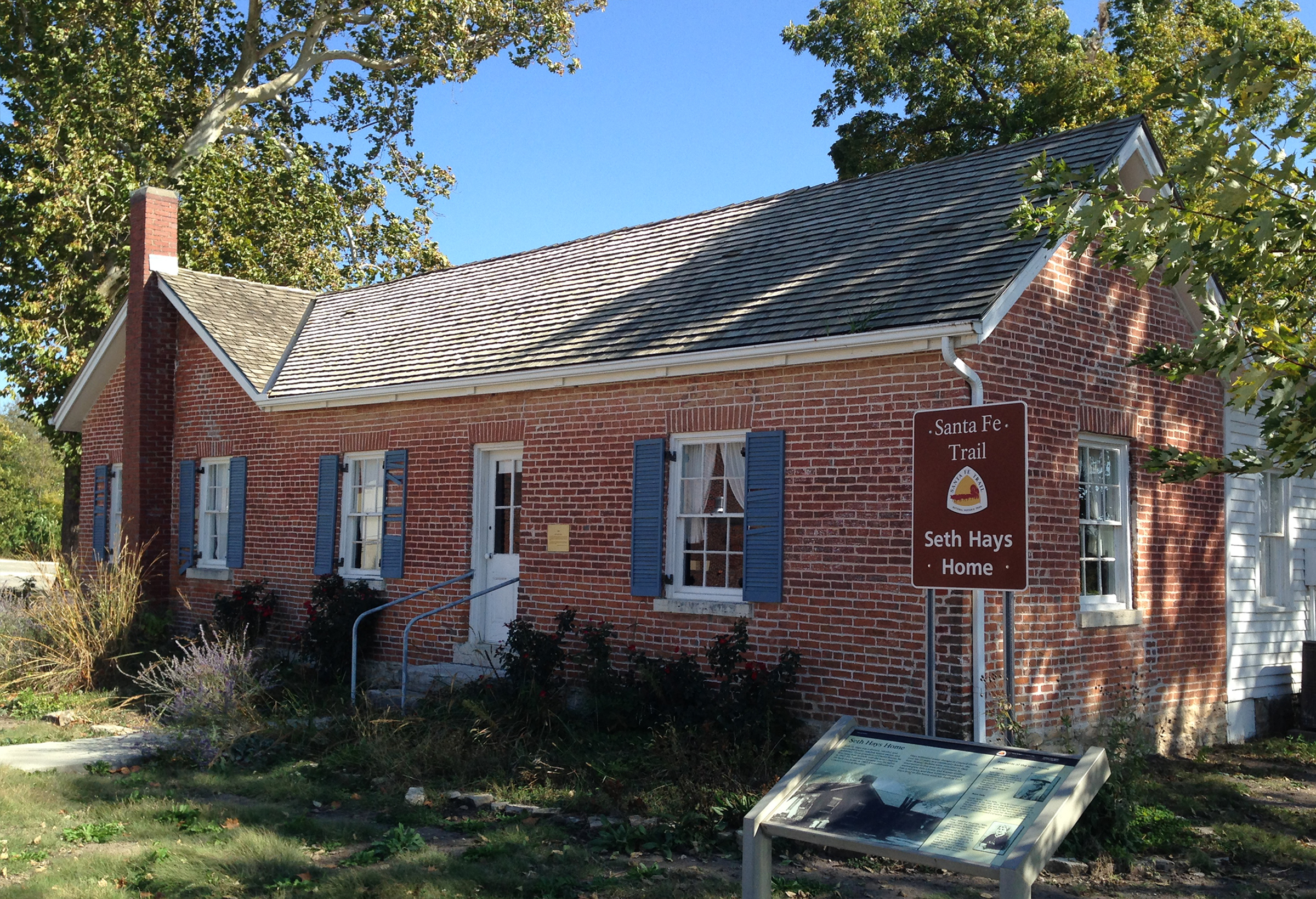

- Location within Kansas
- Location: 203 Wood St., Council Grove, Kansas
- Coordinates: 38°39′32″N 96°29′18″W
- Area: 1 acre (0.40 ha)
- Built: 1867
- NRHP reference No.: 75000718
- Added to NRHP: September 25, 1975

The Seth Hays House is a historic house at 203 Wood Street in Council Grove, Kansas. Seth Hays, the first white settler in Council Grove, built the house in 1867. A Missouri native, Hays originally moved to Council Grove to start a trading post for Boone & Hamilton; he eventually owned the trading post himself, and he also started a local newspaper and the town's first bank. The house was Hays' third in Council Grove; he built a log cabin for himself in 1847, the year he settled in Council Grove, and moved to a brick dwelling in 1860. The 1867 house is a one-story vernacular brick building with an L-shaped plan. While living in Missouri, Hays enslaved a woman named Sarah Taylor, also known as Aunt Sallie. After Kansas became a state and abolished slavery in 1861, she stayed with Hays as a servant, and she lived in the house's basement.

The house was added to the National Register of Historic Places on September 25, 1975.
