= Six Mile Creek Stage Station Historic District =

- U.S. National Register of Historic Places
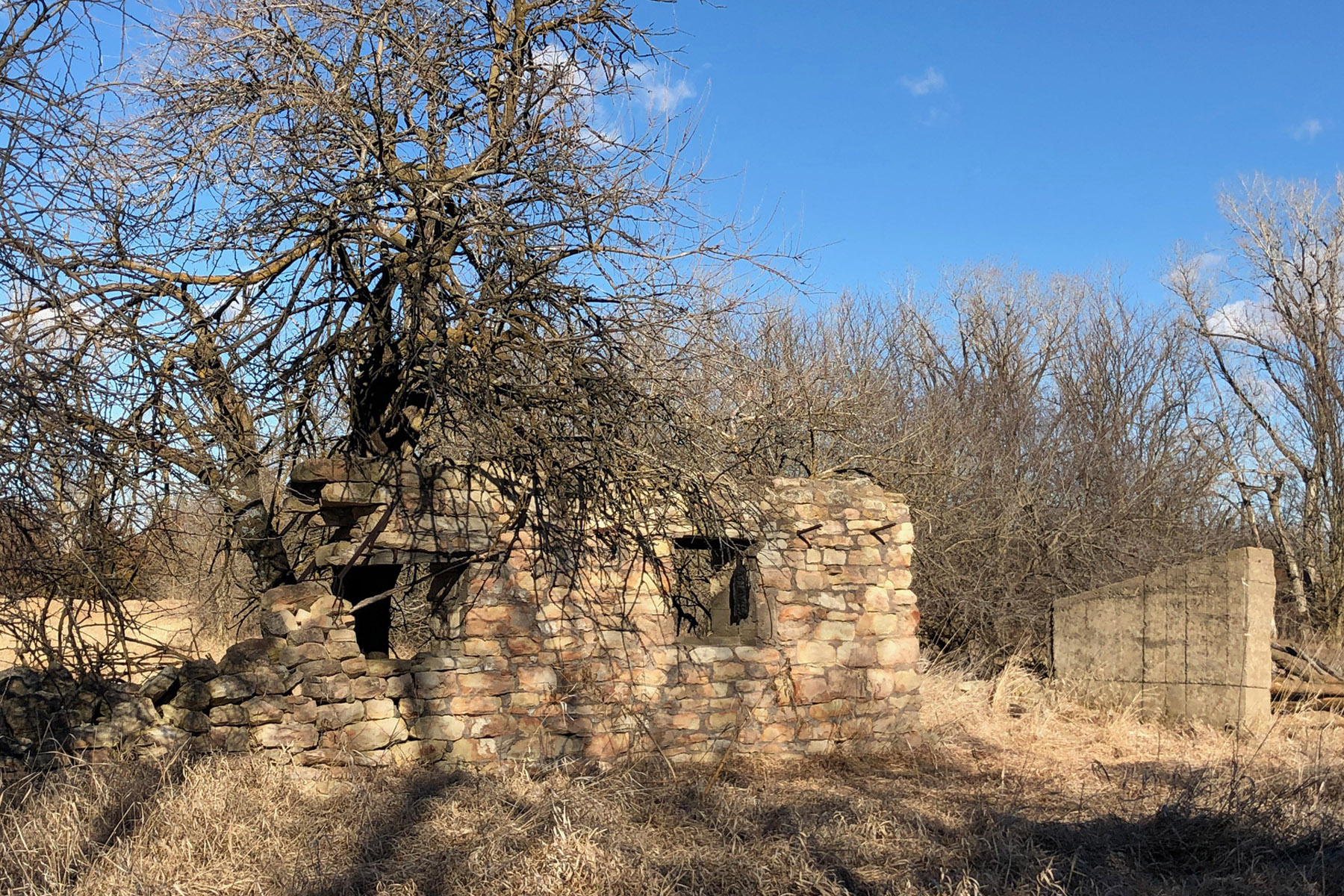
- The remains of the stagecoach station

- Location within Kansas
- Location: 600 feet east of FAS Highway 468, 4¼ miles south of junction with U.S. Route 56, Burdick, Kansas
- Coordinates: 38°36′20″N 96°51′16″W
- Area: 7.5 acres (3.0 ha)
- Built: 1863
- MPS: Santa Fe Trail MPS
- NRHP reference No.: 95000585
- Added to NRHP: May 11, 1995

Six Mile Creek Stage Station Historic District is the site of a stagecoach station and ranch on the Santa Fe Trail in western Morris County, Kansas. The site is located near the trail's crossing of Six Mile Creek, which was named for its location 6 miles (9.7 km) west of Diamond Spring. After the stagecoach station at Diamond Spring was destroyed, a new station was built at Six Mile Creek in 1863. The station lasted until later in the 1860s, when new railroad construction made the stage line obsolete. Charley Owens began a ranch at the site in 1866, and while his ranch only lasted two years, the site was sporadically used for ranching and farming into the twentieth century. In addition to the ruined stage station, the site includes the remnants of a barn, blacksmith shop, corral, and well, along with several ruts from the trail.

The site was added to the National Register of Historic Places on May 11, 1995.
