= Simcock House (Council Grove, Kansas) =

- U.S. National Register of Historic Places
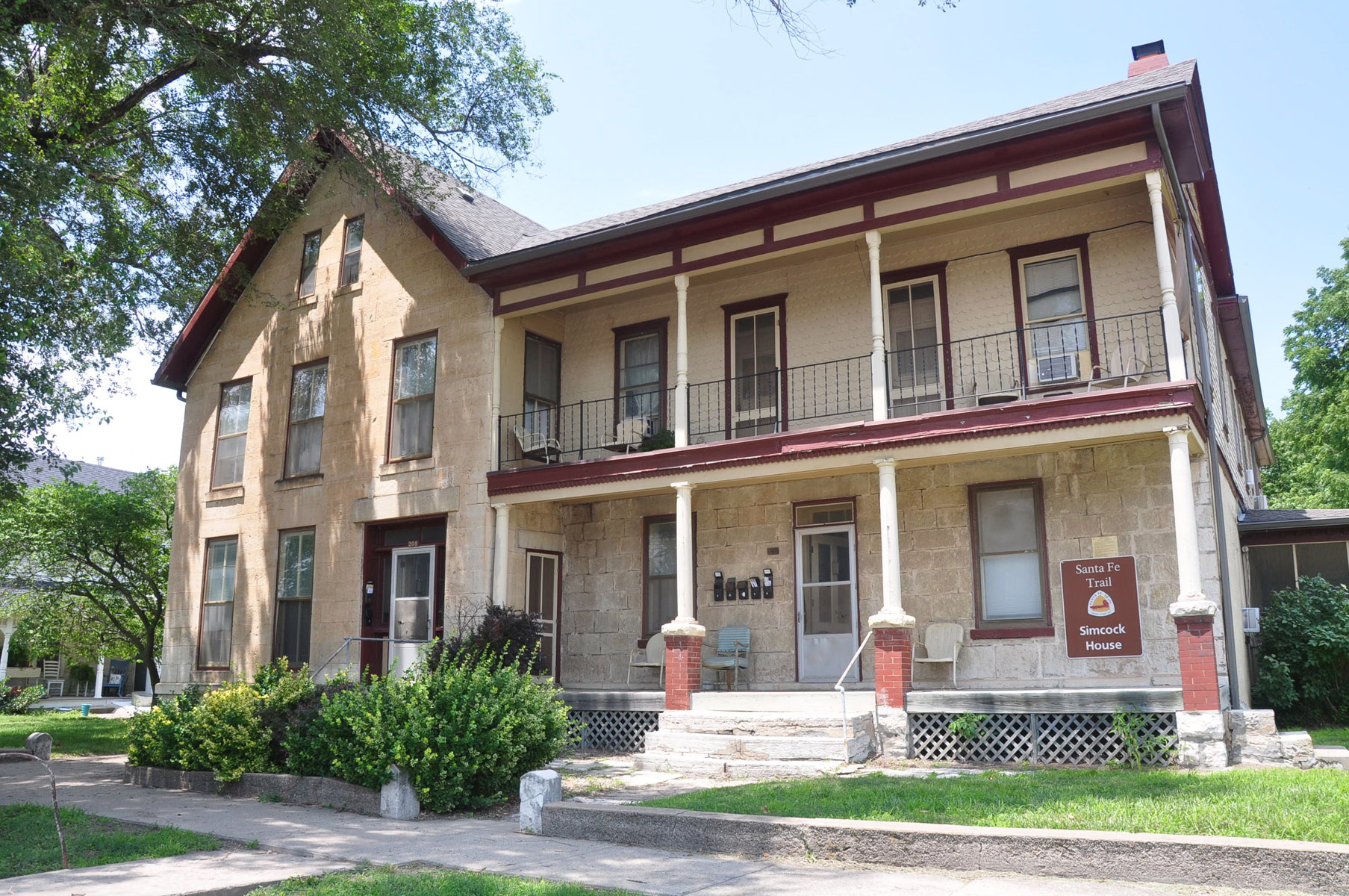

- Location within Kansas
- Location: 206-208 Columbia St., Council Grove, Kansas
- Coordinates: 38°39′43″N 96°29′29″W
- Area: 0.4 acres (0.16 ha)
- Architectural style: Greek Revival
- NRHP reference No.: 82004888
- Added to NRHP: March 11, 1982

The Simcock House is a historic house at 206-208 Columbia Street in Council Grove, Kansas. Goodson M. Simcock, who settled in Council Grove in 1849 to work at a store on the Santa Fe Trail, built the house for his family. Simcock promised his wife a new house after the couple had their first child in 1857, and the house was built sometime between then and 1860. The house's design is inspired by the Greek Revival style, which was popular in Kansas during the 1850s; the front-facing gable and large windows resemble the style's temple form in particular. Simcock sold the house in 1884 to businessman David C. Webb, who built a one-story wing on the east side of the house. W. H. Marks bought the house in 1902 and added a second story to the 1884 wing along with two new wings in the rear of the house.

The house was added to the National Register of Historic Places on March 11, 1982.
