= Jenkins Building =

- U.S. National Register of Historic Places
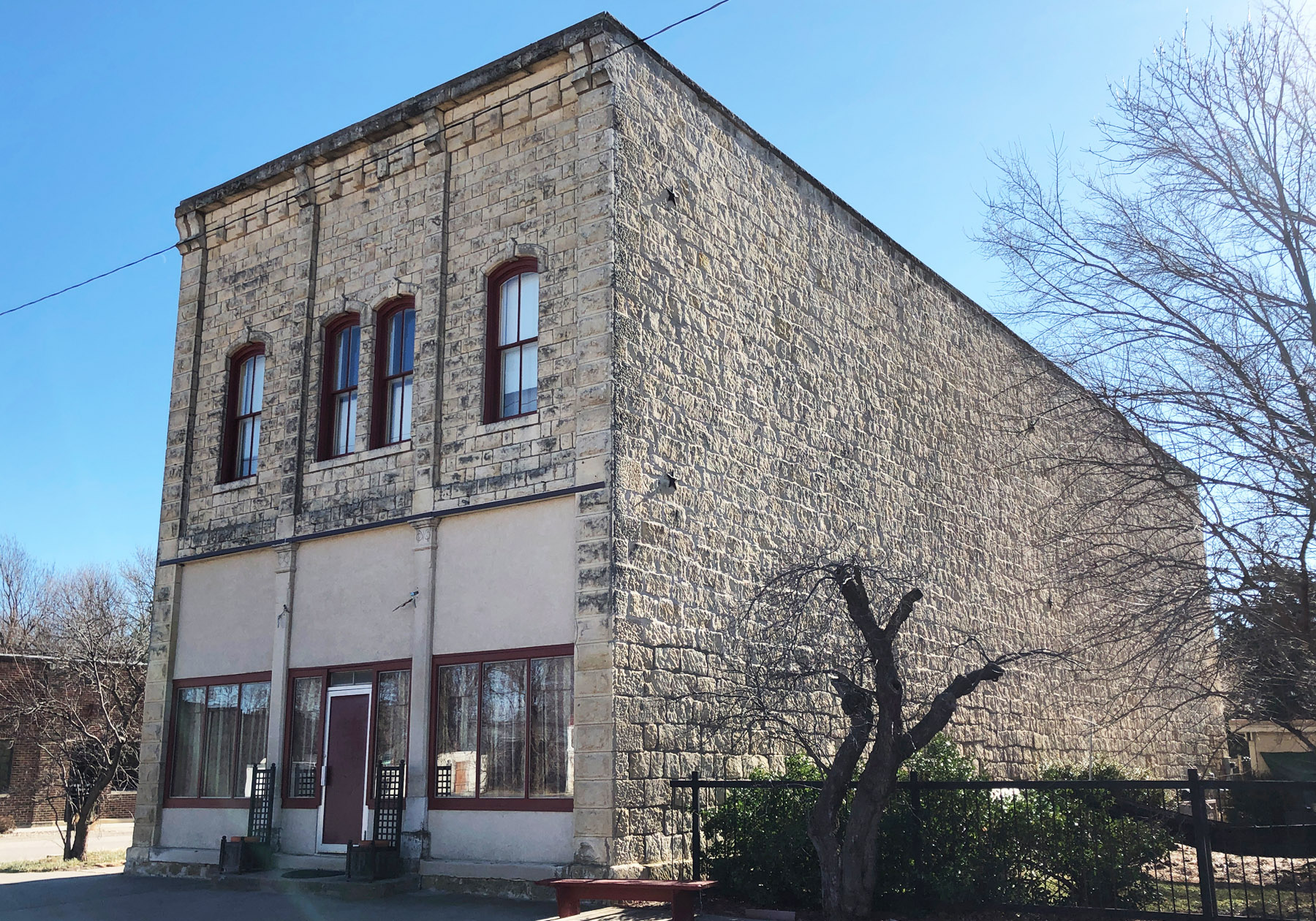

- Location within Kansas
- Location: 101 W. Mackenzie St., White City, Kansas
- Coordinates: 38°47′44″N 96°44′08″W
- Area: less than one acre
- Built: 1885-86
- Architectural style: Italianate
- NRHP reference No.: 04000451
- Added to NRHP: May 19, 2004

The Jenkins Building is a historic commercial building at 101 W. Mackenzie Street in White City, Kansas. William Schilling and Son had the building built circa 1885–86 for their general store. The two-story limestone building had an Italianate design with a plate glass storefront, segmental arched windows on the second floor, and a bracketed cornice. In 1890, the Jenkins brothers bought the store; the brothers, who moved to White City from West Virginia in the early 1880s, had opened a general store in 1884 that was Schilling's only competition. The store grew along with White City over the following decades, as rail service to White City brought new settlers and grain traffic to White City; the Jenkins Brothers both imported products along the railroad and sold goods to settlers and passing farmers and businessmen. The business took advantage of contemporary advertising practices by placing regular advertisements in the local newspaper, publishing a Christmas catalog in the 1920s, and joining the Independent Grocers Alliance. The store lasted until 1939, when the Jenkins Brothers sold their business, and a local cattle rancher bought the building in 1944.

The building was added to the National Register of Historic Places on May 19, 2004.
