= Kaw Mission =

- Old Kaw Mission
- U.S. National Register of Historic Places
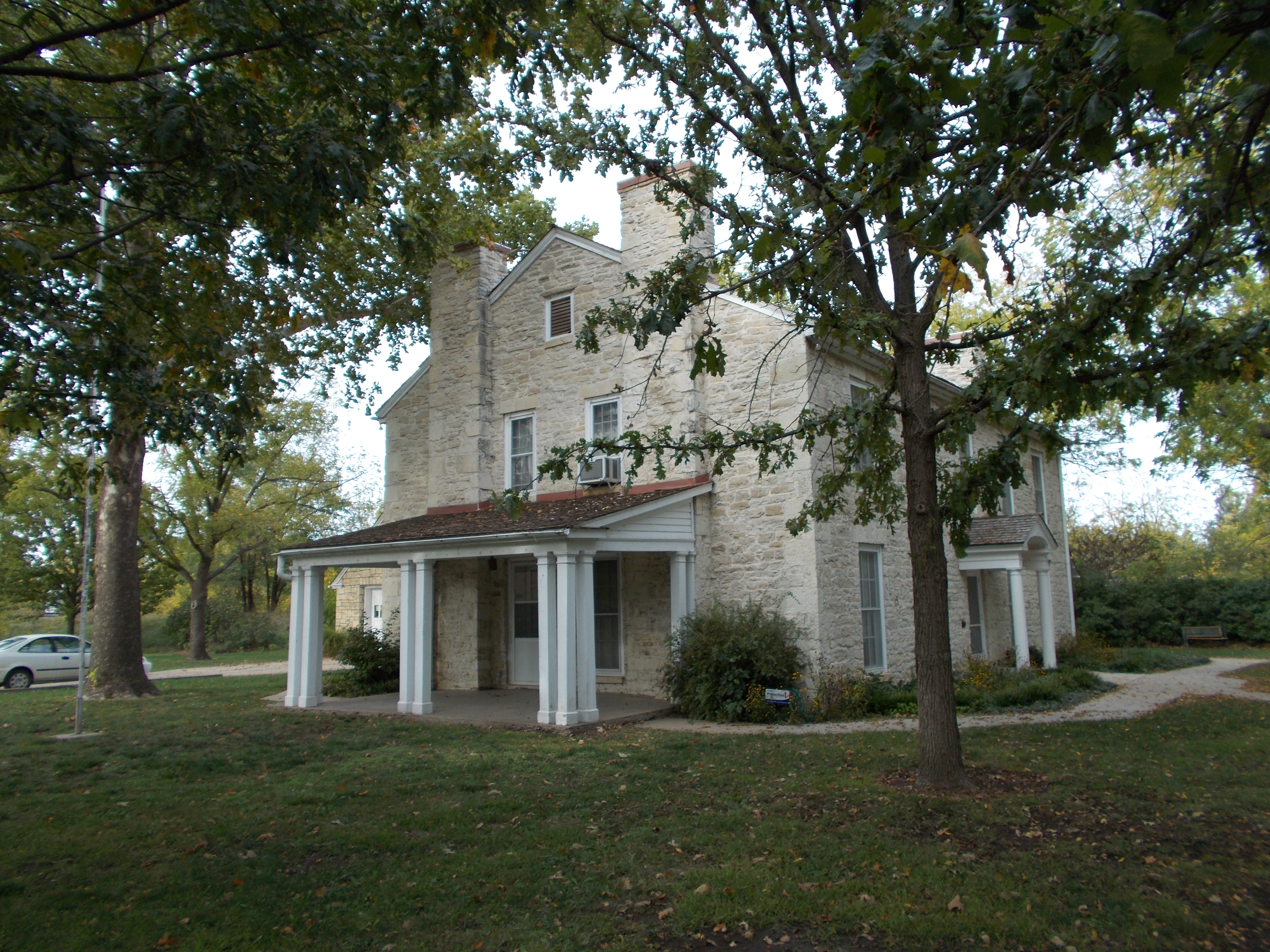
- Kaw Mission Church in 2014

- Location within Kansas Location within the United States
- Location: 500 N. Mission St., Council Grove, Kansas
- Coordinates: 38°39′57″N 96°29′38″W
- Area: 4 acres (1.6 ha)
- Built: 1851
- NRHP reference No.: 71000323
- Added to NRHP: March 24, 1971

Kaw Mission is a historic church mission in Council Grove, Kansas that was home, school and church to 30 Kaw boys from 1851 to 1854. It was listed on the National Register of Historic Places in 1971.

The site is now administered by the Kansas Historical Society as Kaw Mission State Historic Site. Displays include Kaw items and mid-19th century frontier items and furnishings.

The state of Kansas was named for the Kaw (or Kansa). These people lived in the area that is now Kansas for many generations. They were moved to the Neosho Valley where they lived for less than 30 years. Despite an impassioned plea by Chief Allegawaho, the U.S. government removed the Kaw to Indian Territory (now Oklahoma) where they now have tribal lands.

== History ==
The Santa Fe Trail operated as a commerce route between the Missouri and Mexico. The area that is now Kansas was the western limit of American settlement. Trail traffic headed for the Spanish town of Santa Fe, passed through what is now Council Grove. Situated on the Neosho River, the community was a natural stopping place, with water, grass, and timber.

It was there in 1825 that the U.S. government negotiated with the Osages for a passage across their lands. This right-of-way became the Santa Fe Trail, the council with the Osages inspired the town's name.

A treaty with the Kaw in 1846 reduced their lands to a 20-mile square tract that included the present-day Council Grove. Traders and government quickly moved to the new location. Seth M. Hays, the first white settler at Council Grove, established a home and trading post there in 1847 along the Santa Fe Trail.

The treaty with the Kaws established an annual payment of $1,000 to advance the education of the Kaws in their own country. In 1850 the Methodist Episcopal Church South, which had ministered to the tribe since 1830, received governmental approval to construct a mission and school building, which was completed by February 1851.

The native stone building had two stories, eight rooms, and accommodated 50 student boarders along with teachers, missionaries, and farmers. School began in May 1851 under the direction of Thomas Sears Huffaker, a 24-year-old teacher who had served at the Shawnee Manual Labor School near present-day Kansas City. Students received instruction in spelling, reading, writing, and arithmetic. The boys learned the principles of agriculture, but they received no instruction in the trades.

Classes continued until 1854, when the school's excessive fees--$50 a student—led to its closure. The Kaw people considered the mission's purpose degrading and sent only those boys who were orphans or dependents of the tribe. Girls were not allowed to attend the mission.

A subsequent change in 1859 further reduced the Kaw land to a 9-by-14-mile tract (14 by 23 km). The Kaw lands were relinquished in the 1870s, and the tribe moved to a reservation in present-day Oklahoma.

Thomas Huffaker bought the mission lands in 1865, which he owned for 14 years. In 1926 when Carl I. Huffaker, Thomas' son, bought the part on which the mission building stands.

In 1951, the Kansas legislature authorized the purchase of the mission property. The Kansas Historical Society administers the mission.
