= Seth Hays =

Seth M. Hays
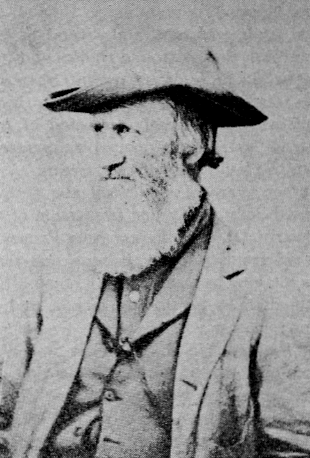
- Born: Seth Millington Hays; April 23, 1811; Callaway County, Missouri, US
- Died: February 3, 1873 (aged 61); Council Grove, Kansas, US
- Burial place: Greenwood Cemetery
- Occupations: Merchant, newspaper publisher

Seth Millington Hays (April 23, 1811 – February 3, 1873) was the first white settler and a civic leader in Council Grove, Kansas.

== Life ==
Hays was born in Callaway County, Missouri, and moved to Kansas in 1847 to open a trading post on the Santa Fe Trail. While he originally worked for the mercantile company Boone & Hamilton, he owned his store outright by the early 1850s. The flood of trail travelers brought by the 1858 Pike's Peak Gold Rush both enriched Hays and spurred settlement in Council Grove, which was incorporated the same year. In 1859, Hays and business partner G. M. Simcock opened a new two-story store and restaurant in Council Grove under the name S. M. Hays & Co.

Hays moved to Colorado in 1862, selling his store to Simcock, but he returned to Council Grove in 1865. He took over his 1859 store from Simcock the next year. In 1870, Hays founded a newspaper, the Council Grove Democrat, and the Council Grove Savings Bank, the town's first.

Hays enslaved a woman named Sarah Taylor, nicknamed Aunt Sally, while living in Missouri. As the Kansas Territory still allowed slavery at the time, Hays brought Taylor with him to Kansas, where she remained a slave. After Kansas gained statehood and abolished slavery in 1861, Taylor stayed with Hays as a housekeeper. Also in 1861, Taylor and Hays began caring for the infant Kittie Parker Robbins, whose mother had died in childbirth while her father was delivering mail on the route through Council Grove. Hays formally adopted Robbins in 1867 with her biological father's consent.

Hays died at his home in Council Grove on February 3, 1873, one year after Taylor; they are both buried in the same plot of Council Grove's Greenwood Cemetery. The S. M. Hays & Co. store is still in operation as a restaurant under the name Hays House; it bills itself as "the oldest continuously operating restaurant west of the Mississippi River". Hays' 1867 residence in Council Grove is now a county history museum and is listed on the National Register of Historic Places.
