= Council Grove, Kansas =

City in Morris County, Kansas

- City and County seat
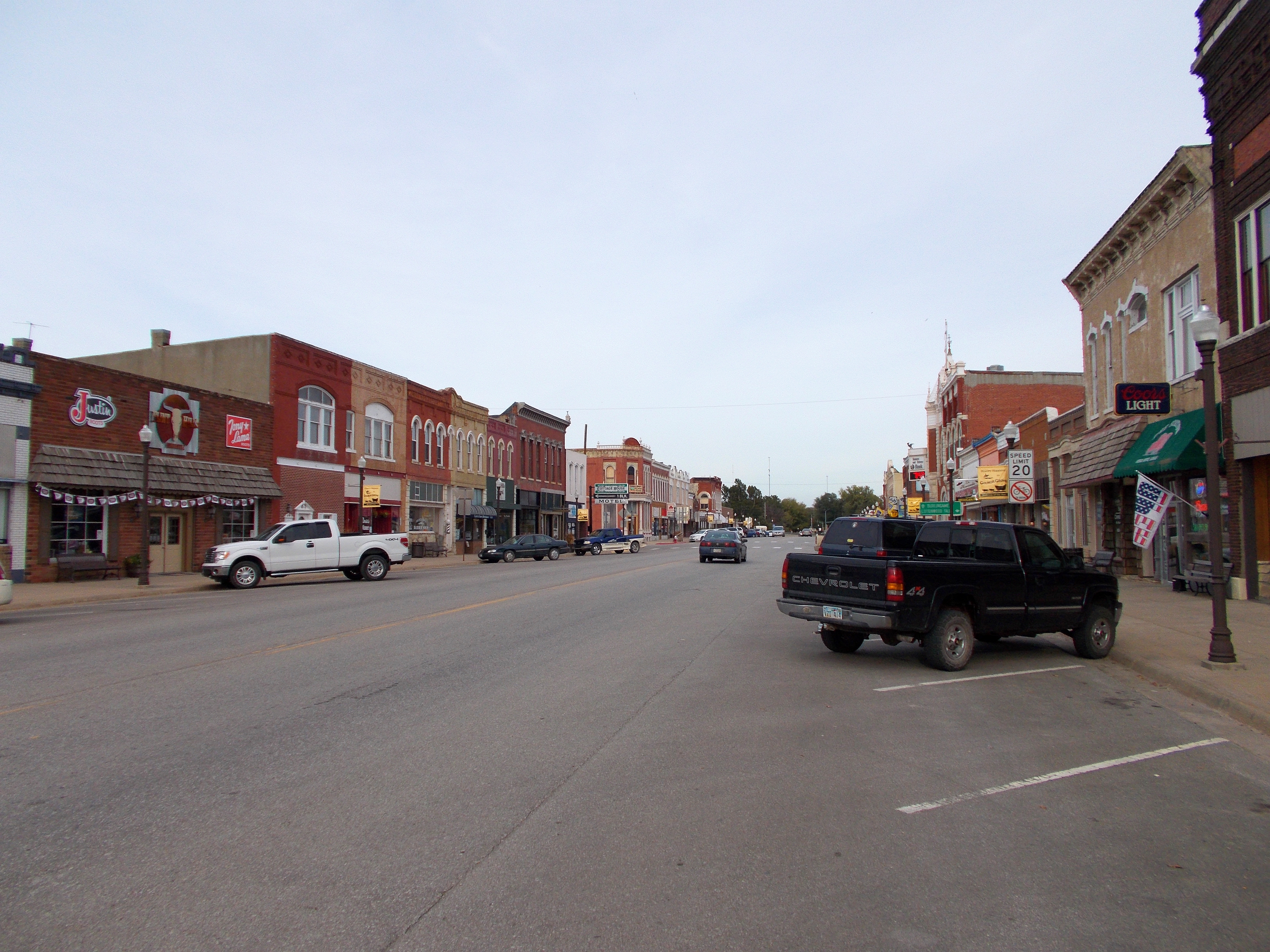
- Downtown Council Grove (2012)

- Location within Morris County and Kansas

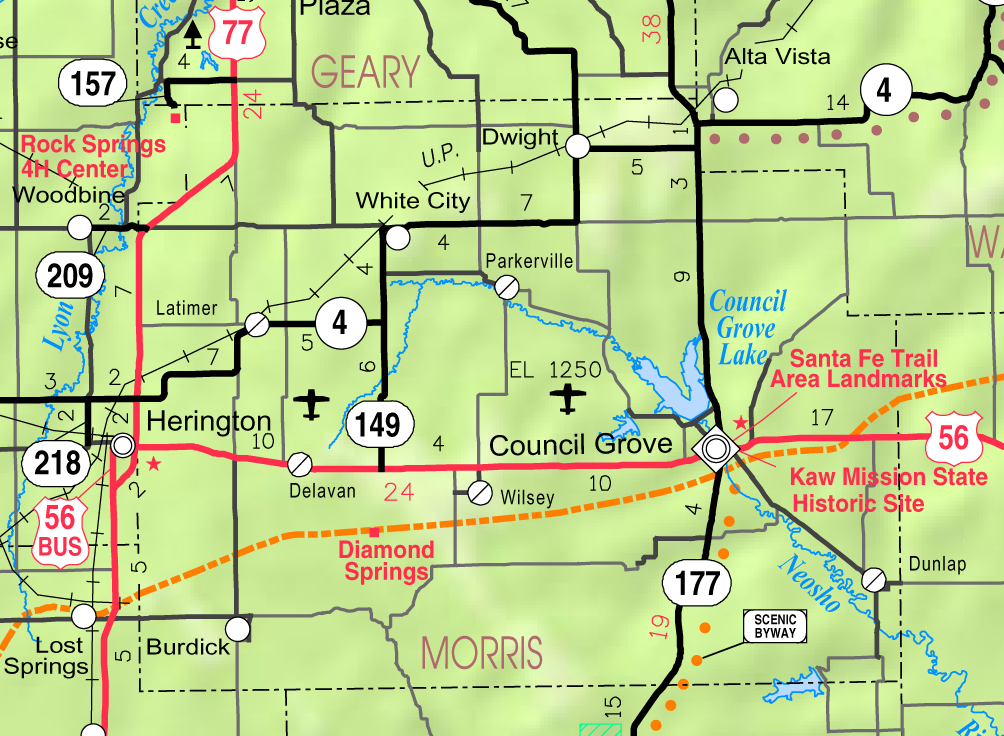
- KDOT map of Morris County (legend)
- Coordinates: 38°39′38″N 96°29′23″W
- Country: United States
- State: Kansas
- County: Morris
- Incorporated: 1887

Government
  - Type: Mayor–Council
  - Mayor: Ryan McDonald

Area
  - Total: 2.05 sq mi (5.32 km^{2})
  - Land: 2.04 sq mi (5.29 km^{2})
  - Water: 0.012 sq mi (0.03 km^{2})
- Elevation: 1,234 ft (376 m)

Population (2020)
  - Total: 2,140
  - Density: 1,050/sq mi (405/km^{2})
- Time zone: UTC-6 (CST)
  - Summer (DST): UTC-5 (CDT)
- ZIP Codes: 66846, 66873
- Area code: 620
- FIPS code: 20-15925
- GNIS ID: 477021
- Website: cityofcouncilgrove.com

Council Grove is a city in and the county seat of Morris County, Kansas, United States. As of the 2020 census, the population of the city was 2,140. It was named after an agreement between American settlers and the Osage Nation allowing settlers' wagon trains to pass westward through the area on the Santa Fe Trail. Pioneers gathered at a grove of trees so that wagons could band together for their trip west.

== History ==
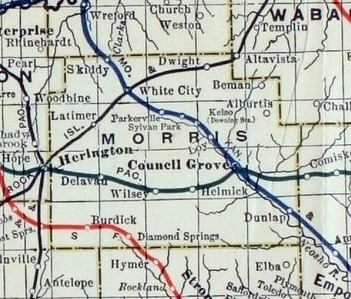
1915-1918 railroad map of Morris County.

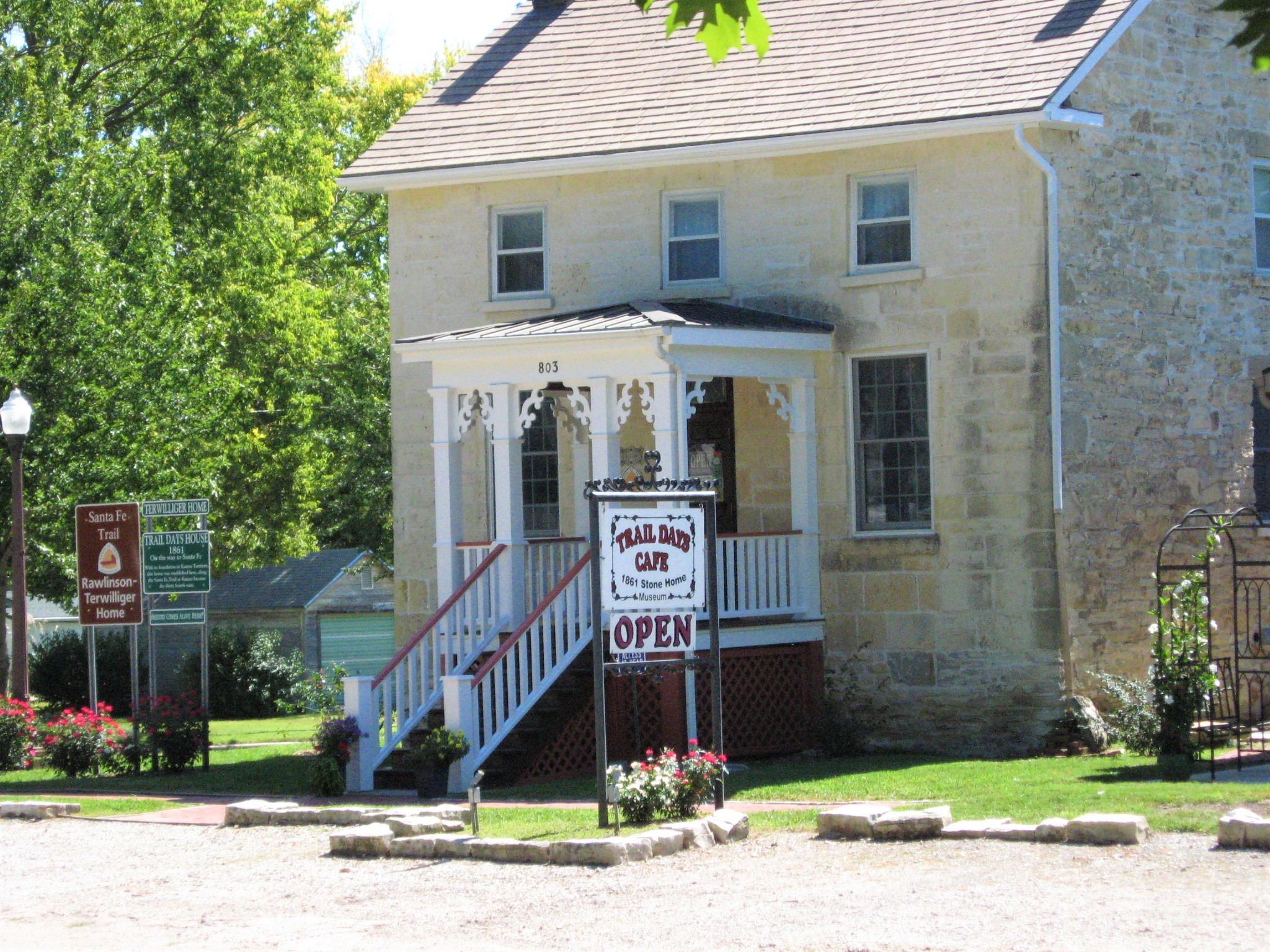
Historic Rawlinson-Terwilliger Stone Home, 803 West Main Street (2021)

Council Grove gets its name from an 1827 treaty signing with Osage Indians under an oak tree for the right-of-way for the Santa Fe Trail.

Council Grove was a stop on the Santa Fe Trail. The first European-American settler was Seth M. Hays, who came to the area in 1847 to trade with the Kaw tribe, which had a reservation established in the area in 1846. Hays was a great-grandson of Daniel Boone.

The Main street in Council Grove is the old Santa Fe Trail. The Rawlinson-Terwilliger Home, 803 West Main Street, is the oldest stone home on the Santa Fe Trail and houses the Trail Days Cafe & Museum.

A post office was established in Council Grove on February 26, 1855.

In 1858, the town was officially incorporated by the legislature. Hays also opened a restaurant in 1857, the Hays House, which is said to be the oldest continuously operating restaurant west of the Mississippi River.

The Missouri-Kansas-Texas Railroad connected to Council Grove in 1868.

The town has 15 sites listed on the National Register of Historic Places. One is the Post Office Oak. Travelers left their mail in this designated tree to be picked up by others going in the right direction. General Custer of the United States Army slept here with his troops during the American Civil War, under a large tree known now as the Custer Elm.

The National Old Trails Road, also known as the Ocean-to-Ocean Highway, was established in 1912, and was routed through Herington, Delavan, Council Grove.

In 1943, German and Italian prisoners of World War II were brought to Kansas and other Midwest states as a means of solving the labor shortage caused by American men serving in the war effort. Large internment camps were established in Kansas: Camp Concordia, Camp Funston (at Fort Riley), Camp Phillips (at Salina under Fort Riley). Fort Riley established 12 smaller branch camps, including Council Grove.

== Geography ==
According to the United States Census Bureau, the city has a total area of 2.01 square miles (5.21 km^{2}), of which 1.99 square miles (5.15 km^{2}) is land and 0.02 square miles (0.05 km^{2}) is water. The city is fifty-five miles southwest of Topeka.

=== Climate ===
The climate in this area is characterized by hot, humid summers and generally mild to cool winters. According to the Köppen Climate Classification system, Council Grove has a humid subtropical climate, abbreviated "Cfa" on climate maps.

Climate data for Council Grove, Kansas (1991–2020 normals, extremes 1908–present)
Month	Jan	Feb	Mar	Apr	May	Jun	Jul	Aug	Sep	Oct	Nov	Dec	Year
Record high °F (°C)	76 (24)	82 (28)	95 (35)	95 (35)	101 (38)	112 (44)	115 (46)	115 (46)	111 (44)	99 (37)	88 (31)	76 (24)	115 (46)
Mean maximum °F (°C)	63.6 (17.6)	69.7 (20.9)	79.4 (26.3)	86.4 (30.2)	90.3 (32.4)	95.0 (35.0)	101.2 (38.4)	100.1 (37.8)	94.7 (34.8)	87.7 (30.9)	75.5 (24.2)	65.4 (18.6)	102.8 (39.3)
Mean daily maximum °F (°C)	40.2 (4.6)	45.3 (7.4)	56.3 (13.5)	66.5 (19.2)	75.4 (24.1)	85.1 (29.5)	90.2 (32.3)	89.1 (31.7)	81.3 (27.4)	69.3 (20.7)	55.4 (13.0)	43.5 (6.4)	66.5 (19.2)
Daily mean °F (°C)	29.9 (−1.2)	34.2 (1.2)	44.7 (7.1)	55.0 (12.8)	65.2 (18.4)	74.8 (23.8)	79.8 (26.6)	78.0 (25.6)	69.5 (20.8)	57.1 (13.9)	44.2 (6.8)	33.6 (0.9)	55.5 (13.1)
Mean daily minimum °F (°C)	19.7 (−6.8)	23.2 (−4.9)	33.1 (0.6)	43.5 (6.4)	54.9 (12.7)	64.5 (18.1)	69.3 (20.7)	66.9 (19.4)	57.8 (14.3)	44.8 (7.1)	33.0 (0.6)	23.7 (−4.6)	44.5 (6.9)
Mean minimum °F (°C)	0.1 (−17.7)	5.3 (−14.8)	14.3 (−9.8)	27.3 (−2.6)	38.9 (3.8)	51.3 (10.7)	58.2 (14.6)	55.4 (13.0)	41.8 (5.4)	27.4 (−2.6)	16.1 (−8.8)	6.4 (−14.2)	−3.6 (−19.8)
Record low °F (°C)	−21 (−29)	−23 (−31)	−9 (−23)	2 (−17)	25 (−4)	39 (4)	44 (7)	40 (4)	28 (−2)	14 (−10)	−6 (−21)	−24 (−31)	−24 (−31)
Average precipitation inches (mm)	0.76 (19)	1.26 (32)	2.24 (57)	3.42 (87)	5.15 (131)	4.87 (124)	4.41 (112)	4.42 (112)	3.19 (81)	2.42 (61)	1.73 (44)	1.12 (28)	34.99 (889)
Average snowfall inches (cm)	4.0 (10)	2.9 (7.4)	1.2 (3.0)	0.2 (0.51)	0.0 (0.0)	0.0 (0.0)	0.0 (0.0)	0.0 (0.0)	0.0 (0.0)	0.4 (1.0)	0.5 (1.3)	2.8 (7.1)	12.0 (30)
Average precipitation days (≥ 0.01 in)	5.0	5.1	7.2	9.4	11.2	9.2	9.2	8.9	7.3	7.0	5.4	4.8	89.7
Average snowy days (≥ 0.1 in)	2.6	1.6	0.6	0.1	0.0	0.0	0.0	0.0	0.0	0.0	0.5	1.8	7.2
Source: NOAA

== Demographics ==
Historical population
Census	Pop.	Note	%±
1870	712		—
1880	1,042		46.3%
1890	2,211		112.2%
1900	2,265		2.4%
1910	2,545		12.4%
1920	2,857		12.3%
1930	2,898		1.4%
1940	2,875		−0.8%
1950	2,722		−5.3%
1960	2,664		−2.1%
1970	2,403		−9.8%
1980	2,381		−0.9%
1990	2,228		−6.4%
2000	2,321		4.2%
2010	2,182		−6.0%
2020	2,140		−1.9%
U.S. Decennial Census

=== 2020 census ===
As of the 2020 census, Council Grove had a population of 2,140 people, with 912 households and 528 families.

The population density was 1,002.3 inhabitants per square mile (387.0/km^{2}). There were 1,050 housing units at an average density of 491.8 per square mile (189.9/km^{2}).

The median age was 41.3 years. 23.8% of residents were under the age of 18, 5.4% were from 18 to 24, 24.6% were from 25 to 44, 22.3% were from 45 to 64, and 23.9% were 65 years of age or older. For every 100 females there were 91.2 males, and for every 100 females age 18 and over there were 88.7 males age 18 and over.

0.0% of residents lived in urban areas, while 100.0% lived in rural areas.

There were 912 households, of which 29.6% had children under the age of 18 living in them. Of all households, 43.3% were married-couple households, 20.2% were households with a male householder and no spouse or partner present, and 31.3% were households with a female householder and no spouse or partner present. About 36.6% of all households were made up of individuals and 18.6% had someone living alone who was 65 years of age or older.

There were 1,050 housing units, of which 13.1% were vacant. The homeowner vacancy rate was 3.7% and the rental vacancy rate was 14.1%.

Racial composition as of the 2020 census
Race	Number	Percent
White	1,945	90.9%
Black or African American	5	0.2%
American Indian and Alaska Native	7	0.3%
Asian	5	0.2%
Native Hawaiian and Other Pacific Islander	1	0.0%
Some other race	46	2.1%
Two or more races	131	6.1%
Hispanic or Latino (of any race)	152	7.1%

Non-Hispanic white residents were 88.18% of the population.

Demographic estimates

The average household size was 2.4 and the average family size was 3.1. The percent of those with a bachelor's degree or higher was estimated to be 20.5% of the population.

Income and poverty

The 2016–2020 5-year American Community Survey estimates show that the median household income was $49,519 (with a margin of error of +/- $7,824) and the median family income was $64,722 (+/- $5,171). Males had a median income of $30,238 (+/- $8,095) versus $27,649 (+/- $1,905) for females. The median income for those above 16 years old was $27,799 (+/- $2,339). Approximately, 5.0% of families and 10.2% of the population were below the poverty line, including 10.9% of those under the age of 18 and 5.5% of those ages 65 or over.

=== 2010 census ===
As of the census of 2010, there were 2,182 people, 991 households, and 565 families residing in the city. The population density was 1,096.5 inhabitants per square mile (423.4/km^{2}). There were 1,107 housing units at an average density of 556.3 per square mile (214.8/km^{2}). The racial makeup of the city was 95.8% White, 0.4% African American, 0.2% Native American, 0.2% Asian, 1.9% from other races, and 1.6% from two or more races. Hispanic or Latino of any race were 6.0% of the population.

There were 991 households, of which 26.5% had children under the age of 18 living with them, 45.5% were married couples living together, 8.3% had a female householder with no husband present, 3.2% had a male householder with no wife present, and 43.0% were non-families. 39.5% of all households were made up of individuals, and 20% had someone living alone who was 65 years of age or older. The average household size was 2.14 and the average family size was 2.85.

The median age in the city was 45.9 years. 21.7% of residents were under the age of 18; 7% were between the ages of 18 and 24; 19.8% were from 25 to 44; 27.1% were from 45 to 64; and 24.4% were 65 years of age or older. The gender makeup of the city was 46.8% male and 53.2% female.

== Area events ==
- Heritage Rendezvous
- Washunga Days

== Area attractions ==
- Allegawaho Heritage Memorial Park
- Kaw Mission State Historic Site
- 1857 Hays House
- Madonna of the Trail monument
- Trail Days Historic Site
- Flint Hills Trail State Park

Presently, both the Council Grove Reservoir and the City Lake are popular for recreational activities. While both lakes are open to the public and motorized boats, most of the land around the City Lake is leased to the owners of over three hundred lake houses. Building is restricted on the larger Council Grove Reservoir but there are many well-positioned camp sites. Excellent fishing is found on these lakes as well. Walleye, crappie, white bass, and many more fish are in both the Council Grove Reservoir and the City Lake.

== Education ==
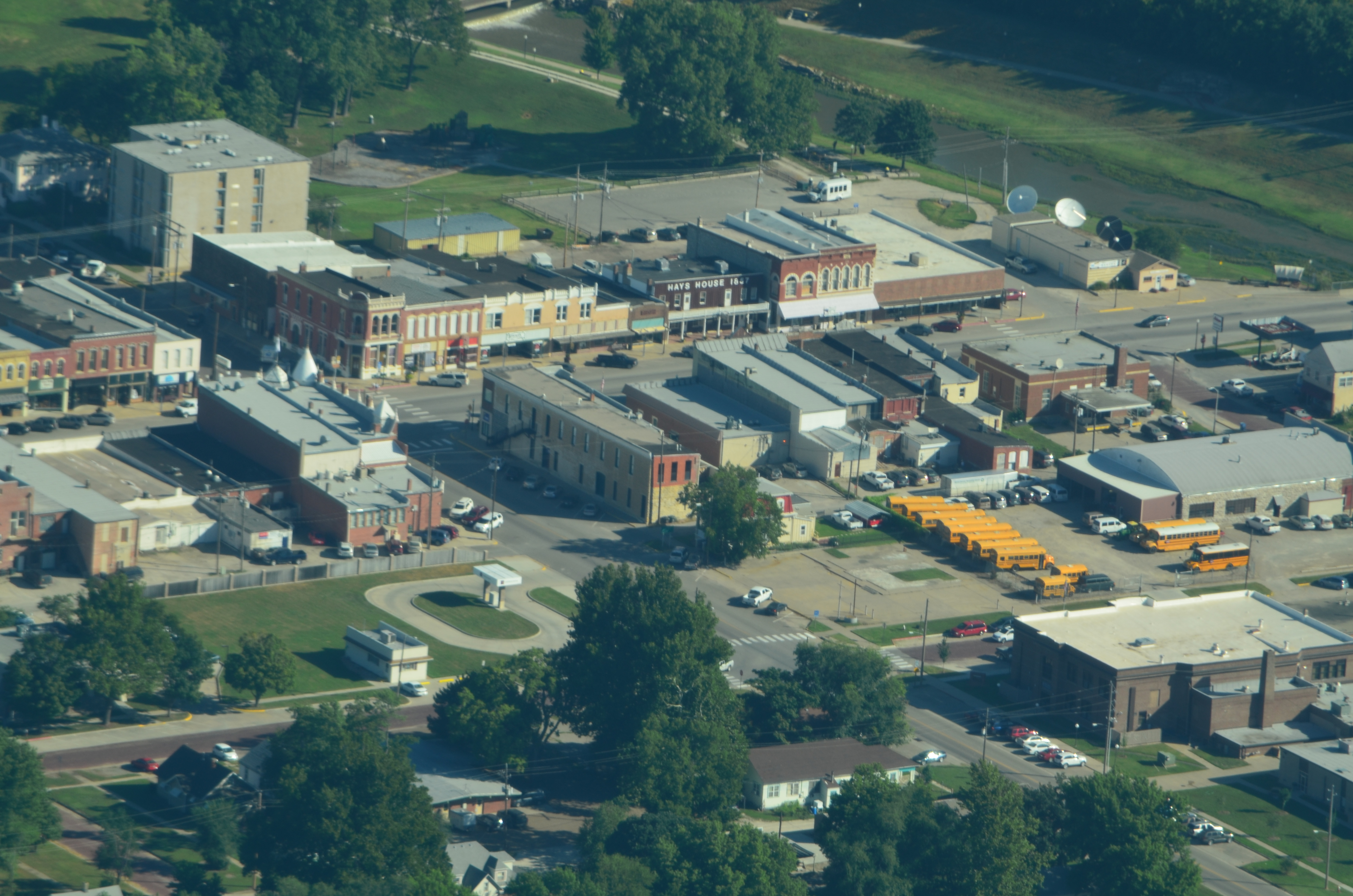
Aerial photo of Council Grove (2013)

The community is served by Morris County USD 417 public school district. Council Grove High School is a high school located at 129 Hockaday St., Council Grove. Students from the surrounding areas travel to Council Grove to attend high school. Council Grove Middle School includes grades 6 through 8 and is located at 706 E Main St. Council Grove Elementary School includes kindergarten through the 5th grade and is attached to the middle school. The athletic teams are known as the Braves.

== Transportation ==
Council Grove was located on the National Old Trails Road, also known as the Ocean-to-Ocean Highway, that was established in 1912.

The Missouri-Kansas-Texas Railroad reached Council Grove on October 27, 1869, from Junction City. A depot was constructed on the 500 block of East Main Street which served until May 18, 1894, when it burned down. Construction on a new depot was immediately begun, and opened on December 31, 1894. While no longer in use, this depot continues to stand today as the Council Grove station on the National Register of Historic Places.

== Notable people ==
- Charles Curtis Vice President of the United States under Herbert Hoover 1929 - 1933, member Kaw Indian tribe.
- Don Harvey, actor
- Clara Hazelrigg, author, educator, social reformer
- James Miller, U.S. Representative from Kansas
- John Rhodes, United States House of Representatives from Arizona 1952 - 1983, House Republican Leader 1973 - 1981

== Gallery ==
- Historic Images of Council Grove, Special Photo Collections at Wichita State University Library
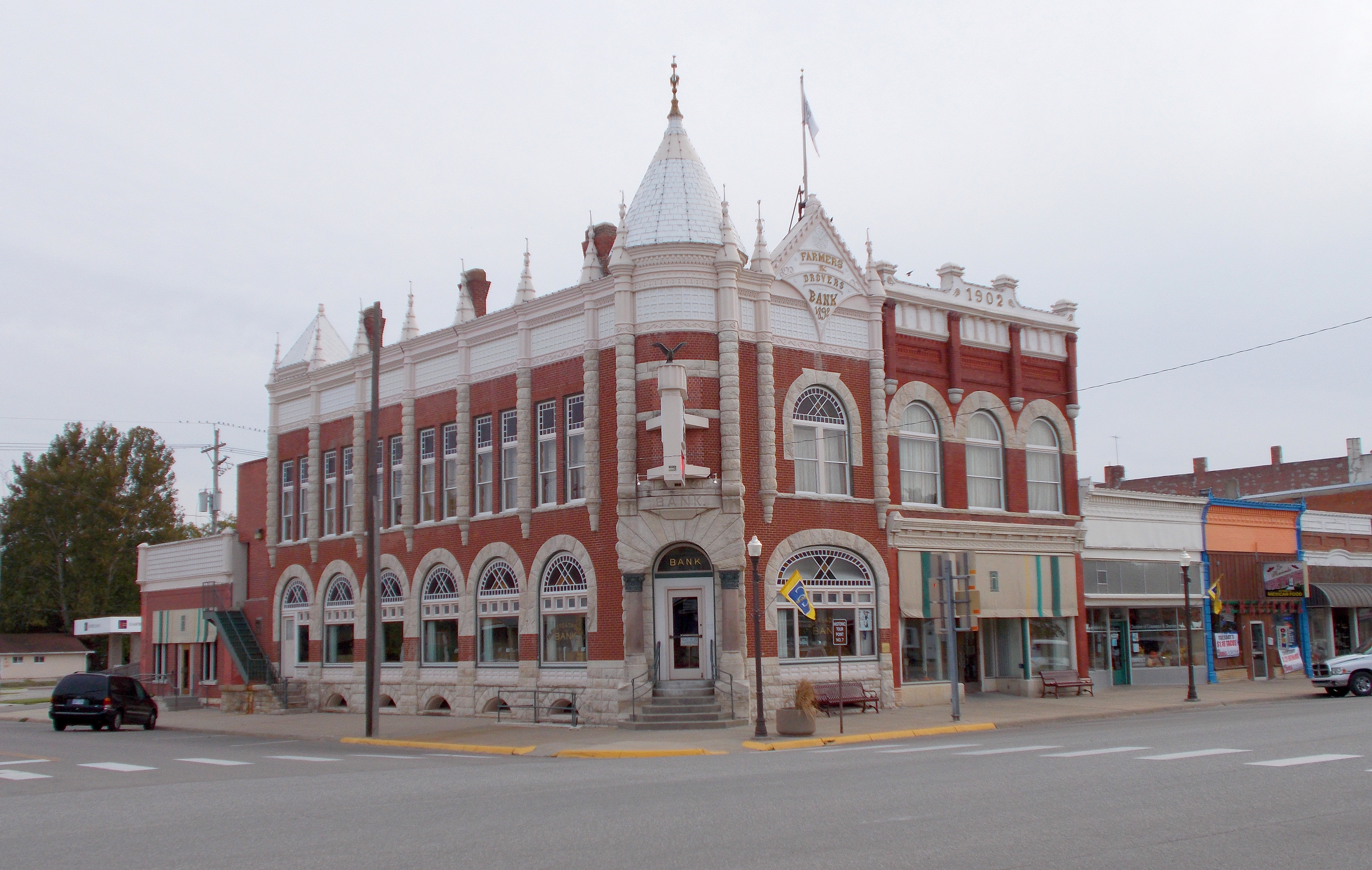
Historic Farmers and Drovers Bank building (2012)

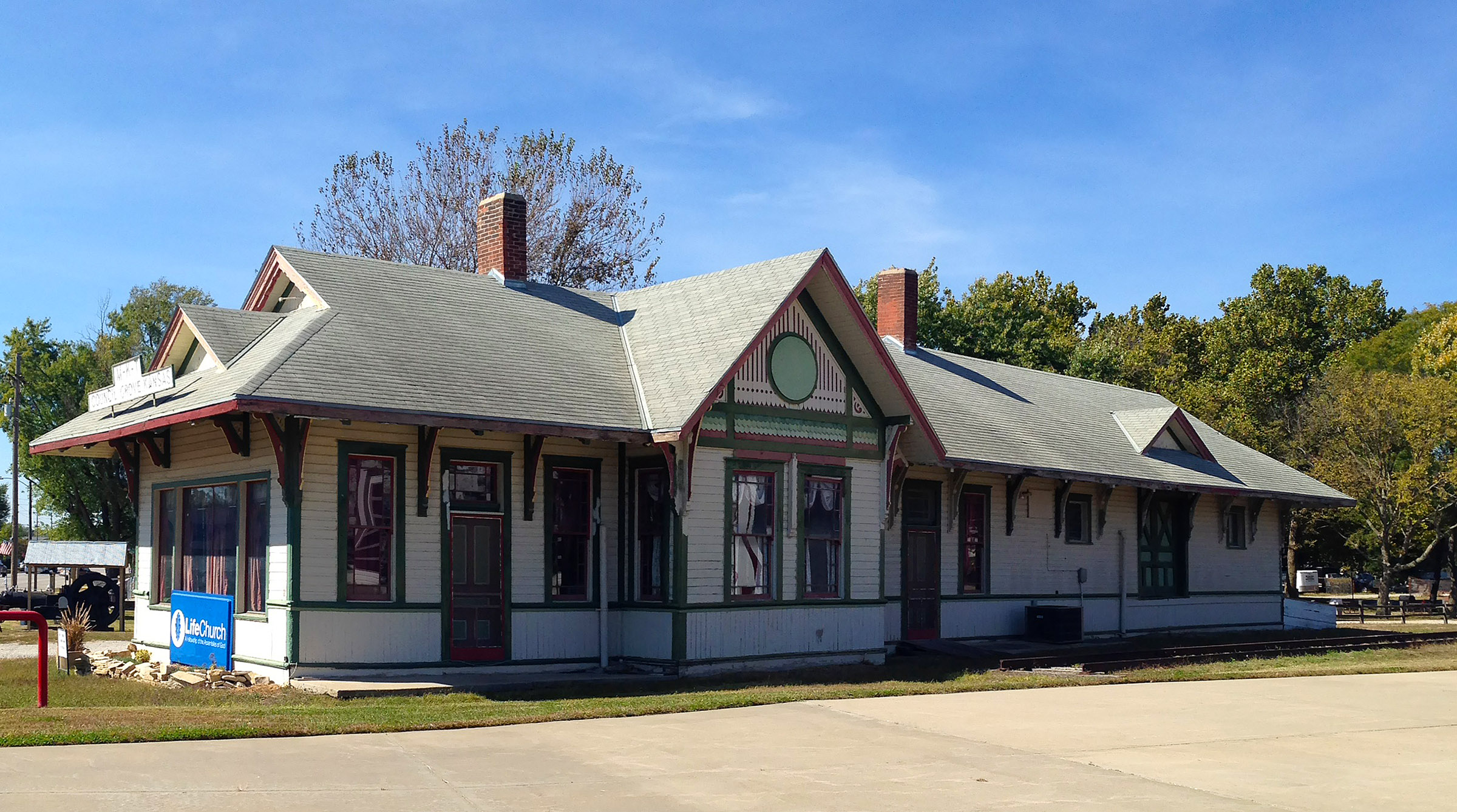
1894 Missouri, Kansas & Texas Railway Depot (2015)

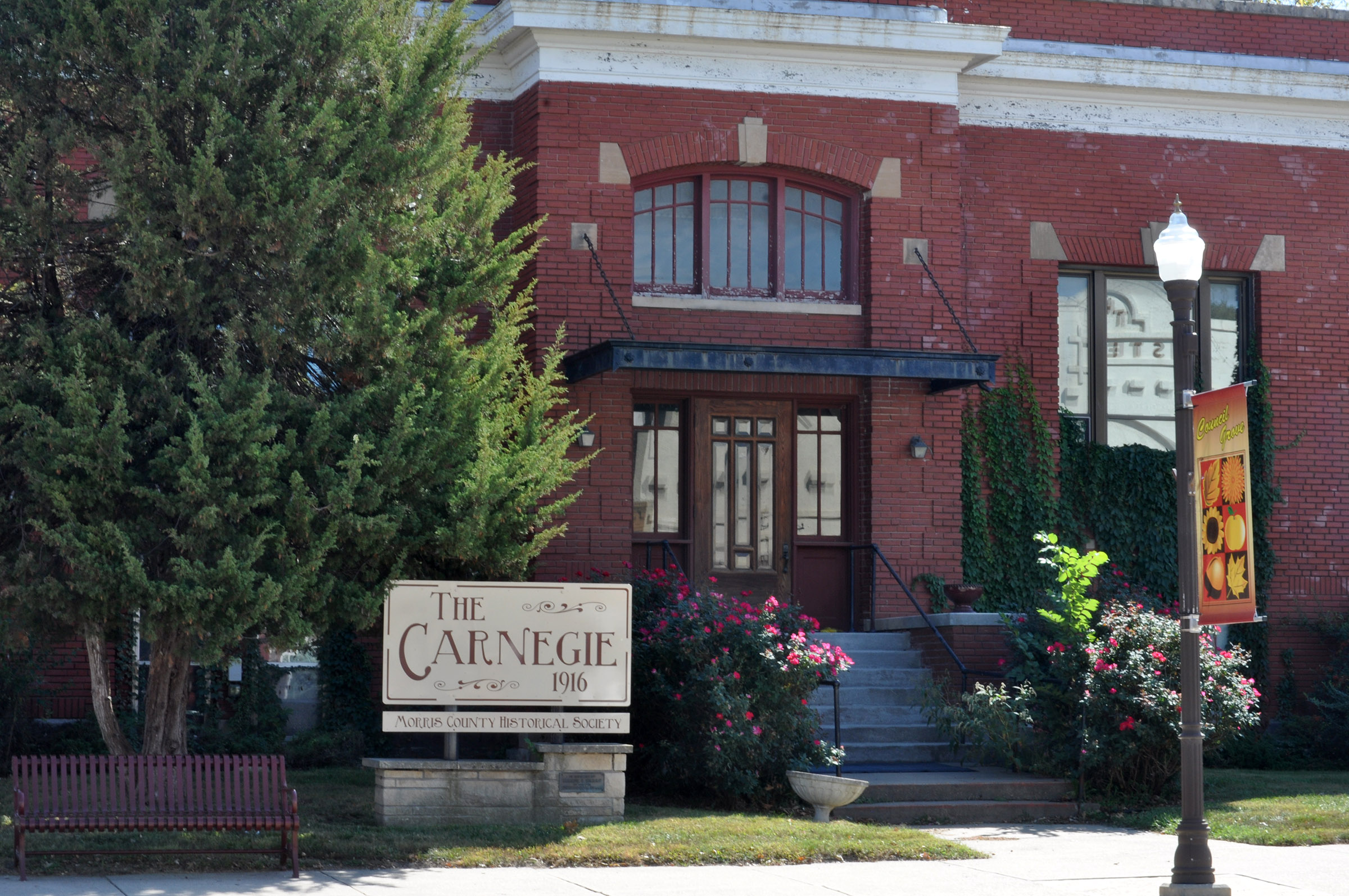
Morris County Historical Society, previously was a Carnegie Library (2015)

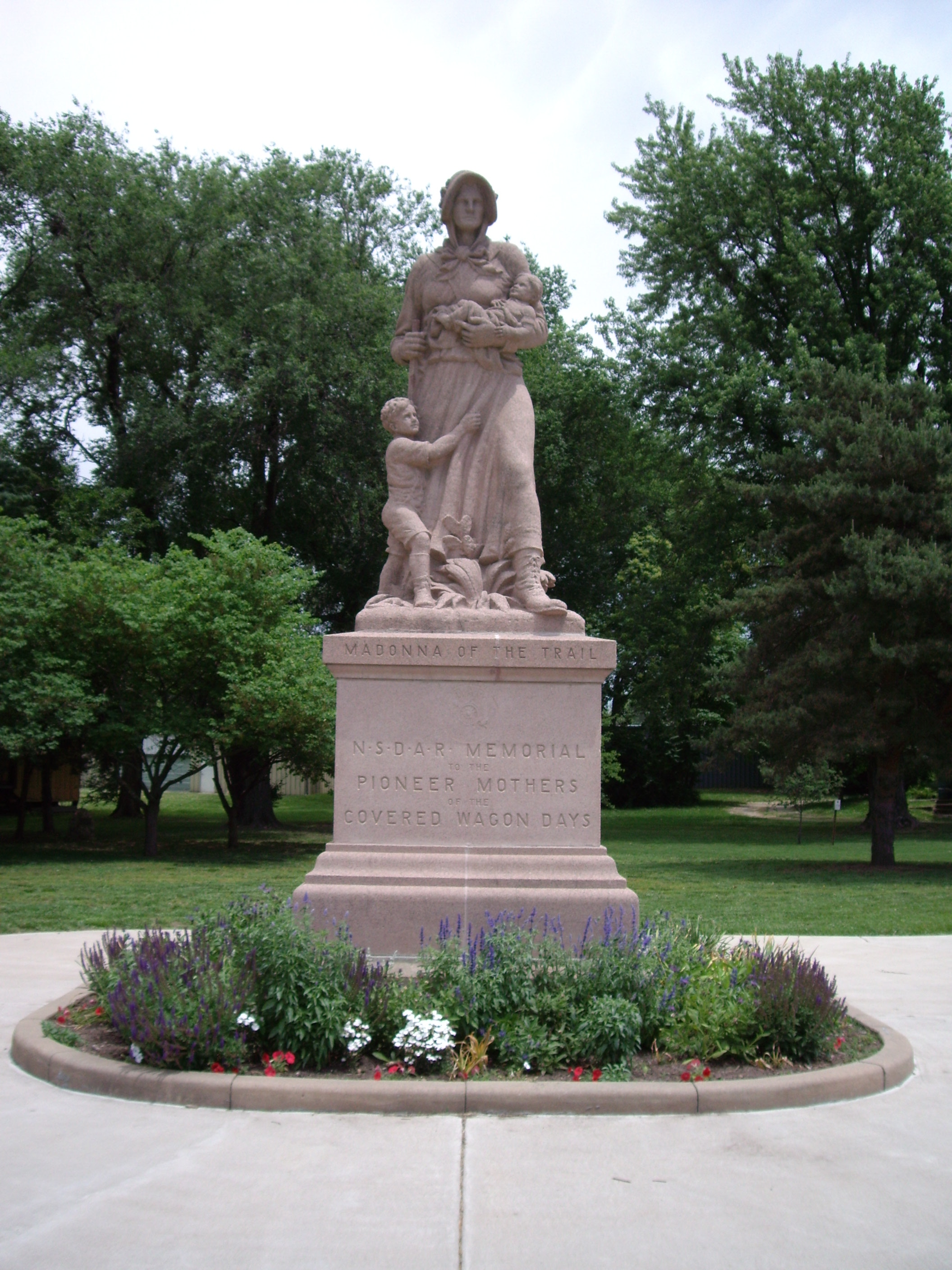
Madonna of the Trail monument in Council Grove (2005)

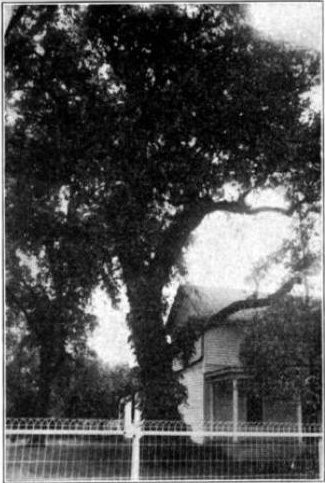
Council Oak at Council Grove (1912)

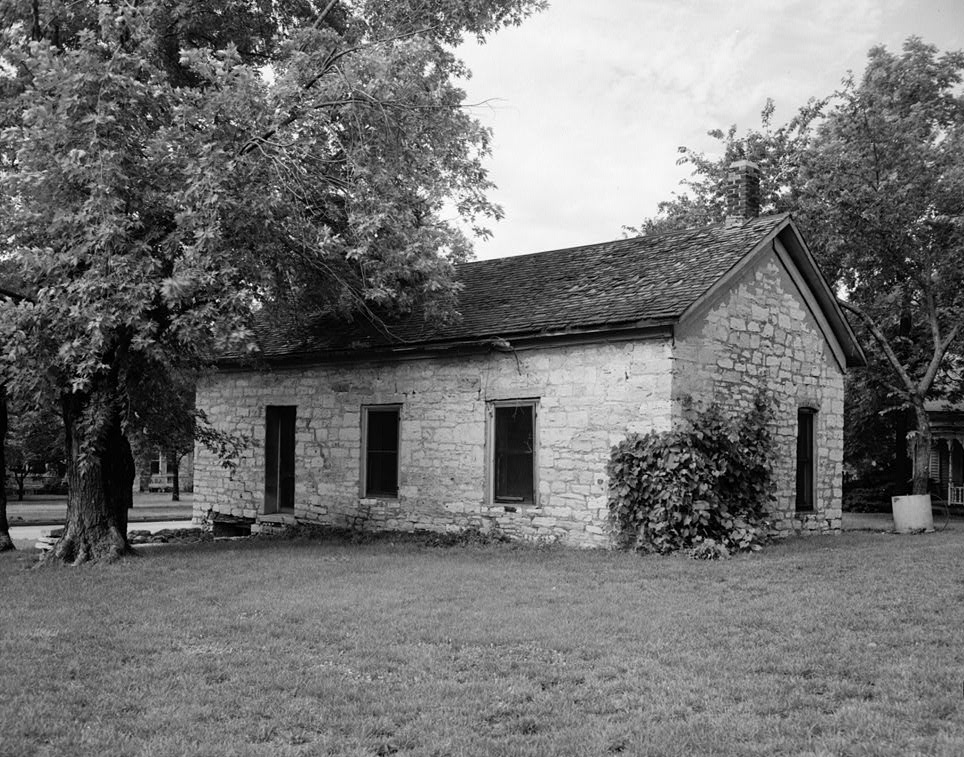
1857 Historic Last Chance Store (1958)

== See also ==
- National Register of Historic Places listings in Morris County, Kansas
  - Council Grove Historic District
- Santa Fe Trail
- National Old Trails Road
