= National Register of Historic Places listings in Wabaunsee County, Kansas =

Location of Wabaunsee County in Kansas

This is a list of the National Register of Historic Places listings in Wabaunsee County, Kansas.

This is intended to be a complete list of the properties and districts on the National Register of Historic Places in Wabaunsee County, Kansas, United States. The locations of National Register properties and districts for which the latitude and longitude coordinates are included below, may be seen in a map.

There are 20 properties and districts listed on the National Register in the county.

This National Park Service list is complete through NPS recent listings posted March 21, 2025.

== Current listings ==
	Name on the Register	Image	Date listed	Location	City or town	Description
1	Alma Downtown Historic District	Alma Downtown Historic District	November 6, 2009 (#09000354)	Missouri St., 2nd to 5th 39°00′47″N 96°17′22″W	Alma	
2	Beecher Bible and Rifle Church	Beecher Bible and Rifle Church	February 24, 1971 (#71000334)	Southeastern corner of Chapel and Elm Sts. 39°08′40″N 96°20′44″W	Wabaunsee	
3	Brandt Hotel	Brandt Hotel	July 2, 2008 (#08000617)	400 Missouri St. 39°01′00″N 96°17′22″W	Alma	
4	East Stone Arch Bridge - Lake Wabaunsee	East Stone Arch Bridge - Lake Wabaunsee	December 30, 2009 (#09001170)	East Flint Hills Dr., 0.9 miles south of K-4; 38°51′45″N 96°10′46″W	Eskridge	
5	Eskridge Bandstand	Eskridge Bandstand	January 6, 2017 (#16000133)	Eskridge City Park, bet. 4th, 5th, Main & Pine Sts. 38°51′26″N 96°06′34″W	Eskridge	
6	Fix Farmstead	Fix Farmstead	April 14, 2015 (#15000149)	34554 Old K-10 Rd. 38°56′57″N 96°24′04″W	Alma vicinity	
7	Grimm-Schultz Farmstead	Grimm-Schultz Farmstead	October 5, 2020 (#100005635)	35180 Old K-10 Hwy. 38°56′38″N 96°24′41″W	Alma	
8	Mount Mitchell Heritage Prairie Historic District	Mount Mitchell Heritage Prairie Historic District	February 17, 2022 (#100007422)	29377 Mitchell Prairie Ln. 39°08′37″N 96°17′47″W	Wamego	
9	Paxico Historic District	Paxico Historic District	October 30, 1998 (#98001289)	101-103, 105, 107, 109 Newbury St. 39°03′57″N 96°10′07″W	Paxico	
10	Paxico Rural High School	Paxico Rural High School	July 12, 2022 (#100007925)	112 Elm St. 39°04′18″N 96°10′06″W	Paxico	
11	Pearl Opera House	Pearl Opera House	August 9, 2024 (#100010620)	601 Main Street; 38°51′51″N 96°29′23″W	Alta Vista	
12	Pratt-Mertz Barn	Pratt-Mertz Barn	February 3, 2020 (#100004928)	34107 KS 18; 39°09′28″N 96°22′35″W	Manhattan	
13	Security State Bank	Security State Bank	May 6, 1982 (#82002678)	Main and 2nd Sts. 38°51′35″N 96°06′29″W	Eskridge	
14	Snokomo School	Snokomo School	January 20, 1995 (#94001576)	8 miles south of Paxico; 38°59′22″N 96°06′48″W	Paxico	
15	Southeast Stone Arch Bridge - Lake Wabaunsee	Southeast Stone Arch Bridge - Lake Wabaunsee	December 30, 2009 (#09001171)	East Flint Hills Dr., 2.2 miles south of K-4; 38°51′12″N 96°11′15″W	Eskridge	
16	Stuewe House	Stuewe House	January 17, 2007 (#06001245)	617 Nebraska; 39°00′55″N 96°17′36″W	Alma	
17	Sump Barn	Sump Barn	May 19, 2022 (#100007708)	26603 K-99 Hwy. 38°58′45″N 96°16′56″W	Alma	
18	Peter Thoes Barn	Peter Thoes Barn	October 30, 2013 (#13000856)	25709 Hessdale Rd. 38°57′59″N 96°15′24″W	Alma	Agriculture-Related Resources of Kansas MPS
19	Wabaunsee County Courthouse	Wabaunsee County Courthouse	April 26, 2002 (#02000399)	215 Kansas Ave. 39°00′44″N 96°17′30″W	Alma	
20	Wabaunsee District No. 1 Grammar School	Wabaunsee District No. 1 Grammar School	November 17, 2005 (#05001238)	56 Center St. 39°08′46″N 96°20′57″W	Wabaunsee	

== See also ==
- List of National Historic Landmarks in Kansas
- National Register of Historic Places listings in Kansas
