= Wabaunsee (disambiguation) =

Waubonsie (or Wabaunsee or Waubonsee or Waubansee) was a Potawatomi leader.

These names may also refer to:

- Wabaunsee, Kansas
- Waubonsie State Park, Iowa
- Wabaunsee County, Kansas
- Wabaunsee Township, Kansas
- Wabaunsee Creek, Kansas
- Lake Wabaunsee, Kansas
- Waubonsie Valley High School, Aurora, Illinois
- Waubonsee Community College, Sugar Grove, Illinois
- USS Waubansee, a United States Navy harbor tug placed in service in 1944 and stricken in 1983
