= Newbury Township, Kansas =

Township in Wabaunsee County, Kansas, U.S.

Newbury Township
- Township
- Location within Wabaunsee County
- Coordinates: 39.044244°N 96.184978°W
- Country: United States
- State: Kansas
- County: Wabaunsee
- Established: 1870

Government
  - Trustee: Joe Flach

Area
  - Total: 78.431 sq mi (203.14 km^{2})
  - Land: 77.983 sq mi (201.98 km^{2})
  - Water: 0.448 sq mi (1.16 km^{2}) 0.57%

Population (2020)
  - Total: 1,091
  - Density: 13.99/sq mi (5.402/km^{2})
- Time zone: UTC-6 (CST)
  - Summer (DST): UTC-5 (CDT)
- Area code: 785
- GNIS feature ID: 476771

Newbury Township is a township in Wabaunsee County, Kansas, United States. As of the 2020 census, its population was 1,091.

== History ==
Newbury Township was established in 1870 from land formerly part of a Potawatomi reservation that was opened for settlement a year earlier. In September 1872, Maple Hill Township was created from the eastern part of Newbury Township, and in July 1875 Kaw Township was created from the north. The first settlers in what would become Newbury Township after it opened up for non-Native Americans were J. W. Phillips and F. Muchendahler in 1869. The first school in the township was built in 1870.

== Geography ==
Newbury Township covers an area of 78.431 square miles (203.14 km^{2}), 0.57% of it water. Mill Creek, Kuenzli Creek, Paw Paw Creek, Snokomo Creek, Joe Woody Branch, Dog Creek, Mulberry Creek, and Turkey Creek all flow through it.

=== Communities ===
- McFarland
- Paxico
- Newbury

=== Adjacent townships ===
Kaw Township, Wabaunsee County
Wabaunsee Township, Wabaunsee County	northwest	north
Alma Township, Wabaunsee County	west	self	east	Maple Hill Township, Wabaunsee County
Farmer Township, Wabaunsee County	southwest	south	southeast	Mission Creek Township, Wabaunsee County
Mill Creek Township, Wabaunsee County

== Transportation ==
=== Major highways ===
- I-70
- US-40

== Demographics ==
As of the 2020 census, the township had a population of 1,091, giving a population density of 13.99 people per square mile (5.40 people/km^{2}). The racial makeup of the township was 90.2% White, 0.4% Black of African American, 0.2% Native American, 0.2% Asian, 0.7% from some other race, and 8.3% from two or more races. Hispanics or Latinos of any race were 6.1% of the population.

The 2020–2024 American Community Survey estimated that the township contained 387 households and 449 housing units.
