= Alma Township, Kansas =

Township in Wabaunsee County, Kansas, U.S.

Alma Township
- Township
- Location within Wabaunsee County
- Coordinates: 39.020589°N 96.312934°W
- Country: United States
- State: Kansas
- County: Wabaunsee
- Established: 1859

Government
  - Trustee: Josh Falk

Area
  - Total: 40.058 sq mi (103.75 km^{2})
  - Land: 39.842 sq mi (103.19 km^{2})
  - Water: 0.216 sq mi (0.56 km^{2}) 0.54%

Population (2020)
  - Total: 1,160
  - Density: 29.1/sq mi (11.2/km^{2})
- Time zone: UTC-6 (CST)
  - Summer (DST): UTC-5 (CDT)
- Area code: 785
- GNIS feature ID: 476749

Alma Township is a township in Wabaunsee County, Kansas, United States. As of the 2020 census, its population was 1,160.

== History ==
Wabaunsee County was organized on March 25, 1859. The first townships were organized the same day, among them, Alma Township. The first settlers in what would become Alma Township were Henry Terass, Fred Plenski, and Gottlieb Zwanziger, who settled there in 1856. An expansion to the west of Wabaunsee County led most of it to be handed to Alma Township. The first school in Alma Township was built in 1862. In 1864, Native American reservation land in the county was divided amongst the townships, including Alma Township, although it would later lose this to newly-created Newbury Township in 1870. In October 1872, Mill Creek Township was created from part of Alma Township. In September 1873, Farmer Township and Washington Township were created from part of Alma Township. A small strip of land was given to Alma Township in the late 1870s, but it was and still remains the smallest township in the county.

Early Alma Township was mostly settled by German immigrants, who made most of the population in the 1860 census. However, some left as Alma Township severely suffered during the 1859–1860 statewide drought.

== Geography ==
Alma Township covers an area of 40.058 square miles (103.75 km^{2}), 0.54% of it water. Mill Creek, Hendricks Creek, Phillips Creek, and Pretty Creek flow through it.

=== Communities ===
- Alma

=== Adjacent townships ===
Wabaunsee Township, Wabaunsee County
Zeandale Township, Riley County	northwest	north
		self	east	Newbury Township, Wabaunsee County
Washington Township, Wabaunsee County	southwest	south	southeast	Mill Creek Township, Wabaunsee County
Farmer Township, Wabaunsee County

== Transportation ==
=== Major highways ===
- K-99

== Demographics ==
As of the 2020 census, the township had a population of 1,160, giving a population density of 29.1 people per square mile (11.2 people/km^{2}). The racial makeup of the township was 91.5% White, 0.4% Asian, 0.2% Native American, 0.1% Black or African American, 0.1% Pacific Islander, 0.7% from some other race, and 7.1% from two or more races. Hispanics or Latinos of any race were 5.0% of the population.

The 2020–2024 American Community Survey estimated that the township contained 545 households and 600 housing units.
