= Wilmington Township, Kansas =

Township in Wabaunsee County, Kansas, U.S.

Wilmington Township
- Township
- Location within Wabaunsee County
- Coordinates: 38.804355°N 96.103705°W
- Country: United States
- State: Kansas
- County: Wabaunsee
- Established: 1859

Government
  - Trustee: John Flach

Area
  - Total: 58.202 sq mi (150.74 km^{2})
  - Land: 58.016 sq mi (150.26 km^{2})
  - Water: 0.186 sq mi (0.48 km^{2}) 0.32%

Population (2020)
  - Total: 583
  - Density: 10.0/sq mi (3.88/km^{2})
- Time zone: UTC-6 (CST)
  - Summer (DST): UTC-5 (CDT)
- Area code: 785
- GNIS feature ID: 476927

Wilmington Township is a township in Wabaunsee County, Kansas, United States. As of the 2020 census, its population was 583.

== History ==
Wabaunsee County was organized on March 25, 1859. The first townships were organized the same day, among them, Wilmington Township. In October 1872, Rock Creek Township was created from the western part of Wilmington Township, and in June 1887, Plumb Township was created from the eastern part. The first settler in what would become Wilmington Township was Henry Harvey, who settled in 1854. The first school in what would become Wilmington Township was built in 1858. Part of the ghost town of Bradford lies within the township.

== Geography ==
Wilmington Township covers an area of 58.202 square miles (150.74 km^{2}), 0.32% of it water. Elm Creek, Locust Creek, Chicken Creek, and Dragoon Creek flow through it.

=== Communities ===
- Eskridge

=== Adjacent townships ===
Mission Creek Township, Wabaunsee County
Mill Creek Township, Wabaunsee County	northwest	north
Rock Creek Township, Wabaunsee County	west	self	east	Plumb Township, Wabaunsee County
Agnes City Township, Lyon County	southwest		southeast	Waterloo Township, Lyon County

== Transportation ==
=== Major highways ===
- K-4
- K-31
- K-99

== Demographics ==
As of the 2020 census, the township had a population of 583, giving a population density of 10.0 people per square mile (3.9 people/km^{2}). The racial makeup of the township was 94.7% White, 0.5% Asian, 0.2% Native American, 0.3% from some other race, and 4.3% from two or more races. Hispanics or Latinos of any race were 2.1% of the population.

The 2020–2024 American Community Survey estimated that the township contained 196 households and 234 housing units.
