= Vera, Kansas =

Ghost town in Wabaunsee County, Kansas, United States

- Ghost town
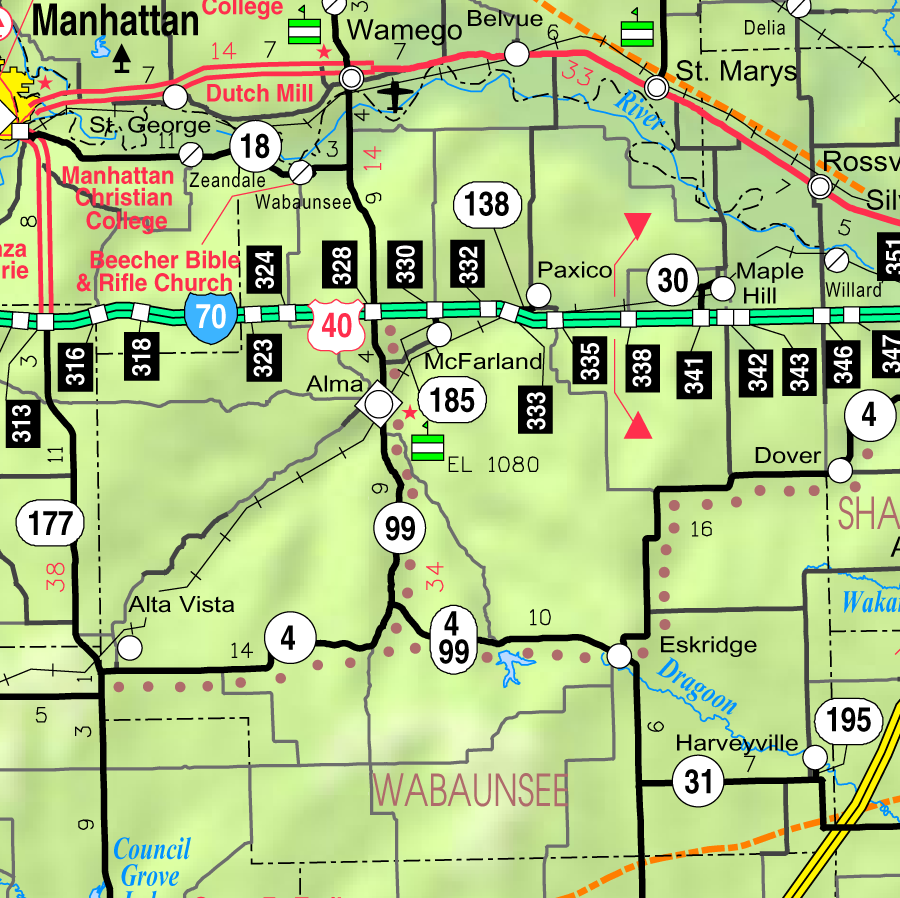
- KDOT map of Wabaunsee County (legend)

- Location within Kansas Location within the United States
- Coordinates: 39°04′01″N 96°05′42″W
- Country: United States
- State: Kansas
- County: Wabaunsee
- Elevation: 968 ft (295 m)

Population
  - Total: 0
- Time zone: UTC-6 (CST)
  - Summer (DST): UTC-5 (CDT)
- Area code: 785
- FIPS code: 20-73470
- GNIS ID: 484785

Vera is a ghost town in Wabaunsee County, Kansas, United States. It was located approximately 3.6 miles east of Paxico near Mill Creek, a tributary of the Kansas River.

== History ==
Frederick L. Raymond was an early settler. When the Chicago, Kansas and Nebraska Railway built a line through the area in 1887, part of it ran through Raymond's farm. Raymond was influential in getting a flag station and post office named "Vera" erected at the location. The residents of Vera paid for a siding to be built, and donated 7 acres (2.8 ha) of land on which the flag station, as well as a platform and stock yard, were built. The railway was soon after acquired by the Chicago, Rock Island and Pacific Railroad. In 1893, residents of Vera filed a complaint with the Kansas Board of Railroad Commissioners, claiming the settlement needed a depot and additional storage facilities. They argued that because Vera was separated from its two neighboring rail stations at Paxico and Maple Hill by ranges of hills, it was difficult to haul grain and farm products to these places. The Railroad Commissioners ordered the railroad to erect a depot at Vera which could shelter passengers and protect local freight.

Vera was noted as having a store, operated by John Verity.

References were made in 1913 and 1939 to a school existing in Vera.

In early 1920s, a steel bridge was built along Vera Road where it crossed Mill Creek north of the settlement. The bridge was replaced with a concrete bridge in 2004.

== Notable people ==
- Frederick L. Raymond, member of the Kansas House of Representatives.
- Alden E. True, member of the Kansas Senate during the 1890s.
