= Security State Bank =

Security State Bank or Security State Bank Building may refer to:

in the United States (by state)

- Security State Bank (Eskridge, Kansas), listed on the National Register of Historic Places (NRHP) in Kansas
- Security State Bank Building (Broken Bow, Nebraska), listed on the NRHP in Nebraska
- Security State Bank (Willow Lake, South Dakota), listed on the NRHP in South Dakota
