= Alma Downtown Historic District =

Alma Downtown Historic District may refer to:

- Alma Downtown Historic District (Alma, Kansas), listed on the National Register of Historic Places (NRHP) in Waubaunsee County
- Alma Downtown Historic District (Alma, Michigan), NRHP-listed in Gratiot County

== See also ==
- Alma Historic District, in Alma, Wisconsin.
