= Garfield Township, Wabaunsee County, Kansas =

Township in Wabaunsee County, Kansas, U.S.

Garfield Township
- Township
- Location within Wabaunsee County
- Coordinates: 38.875665°N 96.442365°W
- Country: United States
- State: Kansas
- County: Wabaunsee
- Established: 1886

Government
  - Trustee: Jim Furney

Area
  - Total: 45.381 sq mi (117.54 km^{2})
  - Land: 45.233 sq mi (117.15 km^{2})
  - Water: 0.148 sq mi (0.38 km^{2}) 0.33%

Population (2020)
  - Total: 561
  - Density: 12.4/sq mi (4.79/km^{2})
- Time zone: UTC-6 (CST)
  - Summer (DST): UTC-5 (CDT)
- Area code: 785
- GNIS feature ID: 476738

Garfield Township is a township in Wabaunsee County, Kansas, United States. As of the 2020 census, its population was 561.

== History ==
Garfield Township was established in October 1886 from the southern part of Washington Township.

== Geography ==
Garfield Township covers an area of 45.381 square miles (117.54 km^{2}), 0.33% of it water. Munkers Creek flows through it, as well as the west branch of Mill Creek.

=== Communities ===
- Alta Vista

=== Adjacent townships ===
Washington Township, Wabaunsee County
		north
Liberty Township, Geary County	west	self	east	Farmer Township, Wabaunsee County
Township 3, Morris County	southwest	south	southeast	Rock Creek Township, Wabaunsee County
Township 2, Morris County

== Transportation ==
=== Major highways ===
- K-4
- K-177

== Demographics ==
As of the 2020 census, the township had a population of 561, giving a population density of 12.4 people per square mile (4.8 people/km^{2}). The racial makeup of the township was 93.2% White, 1.2% Native American, 0.5% Black or African American, 1.2% from some other race, and 3.7% from two or more races. Hispanics or Latinos of any race were 4.1% of the population.

The 2020–2024 American Community Survey estimated that the township contained 244 households and 284 housing units.
