= Township 3, Morris County, Kansas =

Township in Morris County, Kansas, U.S.

Township 3
- Township
- Location within Morris County
- Coordinates: 38.81897°N 96.568964°W
- Country: United States
- State: Kansas
- County: Morris

Area
  - Total: 42.175 sq mi (109.23 km^{2})
  - Land: 42.052 sq mi (108.91 km^{2})
  - Water: 0.123 sq mi (0.32 km^{2}) 0.29%

Population (2020)
  - Total: 382
  - Density: 9.08/sq mi (3.51/km^{2})
- Time zone: UTC-6 (CST)
  - Summer (DST): UTC-5 (CDT)
- Area code(s): 785, 620

Township 3 is a township in Morris County, Kansas, United States. As of the 2020 census, its population was 382.

== Geography ==
Township 3 covers an area of 42.175 square miles (109.23 square kilometers).

=== Communities ===
- Dwight

=== Adjacent townships ===
- Liberty Township, Geary County (north)
- Garfield Township, Wabaunsee County (northeast)
- Township 2, Morris County (southeast)
- Township 4, Morris County (southwest)

=== Major highways ===
- K-4
- K-57
- K-177
