= Washington Township, Wabaunsee County, Kansas =

Township in Wabaunsee County, Kansas, U.S.

Washington Township
- Township
- Location within Wabaunsee County
- Coordinates: 38.979629°N 96.441498°W
- Country: United States
- State: Kansas
- County: Wabaunsee
- Established: 1873

Government
  - Trustee: Brent Miller

Area
  - Total: 57.168 sq mi (148.06 km^{2})
  - Land: 57.004 sq mi (147.64 km^{2})
  - Water: 0.164 sq mi (0.42 km^{2}) 0.29%

Population (2020)
  - Total: 70
  - Density: 1.2/sq mi (0.47/km^{2})
- Time zone: UTC-6 (CST)
  - Summer (DST): UTC-5 (CDT)
- Area code: 785
- GNIS feature ID: 476739

Washington Township is a township in Wabaunsee County, Kansas, United States. As of the 2020 census, its population was 70.

== History ==
Washington Township was established in September 1873 from part of Alma Township. Garfield Township would be created from the southern part of Washington Township in October 1886. The first settlers in what would become Washington Township were Henry Grimm, A. Brasche, Mr. Maxbrink, Adolph Patting, and Mr. Durfee, who settled in 1857. The first school in what would become Washington Township was built in 1868.

== Geography ==
Washington Township covers an area of 57.168 square miles (148.06 km^{2}), 0.29% of it water. The west branch of Mill Creek, Spring Creek, Poole Branch, and Deadman Creek flow through it.

=== Communities ===
- Volland

=== Adjacent townships ===
Zeandale Township, Riley County
		north	northeast	Alma Township, Wabaunsee County
Jackson Township, Geary County	west	self	east	Farmer Township, Wabaunsee County
Liberty Township, Geary County	southwest	south
Garfield Township, Wabaunsee County

== Demographics ==
As of the 2020 census, the township had a population of 70, giving a population density of 1.2 people per square mile (0.46 people/km^{2}). The racial makeup of the township was 87.1% White, 5.7% Native American, 1.4% Pacific Islander, and 5.7% from two or more races. Hispanics or Latinos of any race were 8.6% of the population.

The 2020–2024 American Community Survey estimated that the township contained 101 households and 101 housing units.
