= Waubonsie =

Potawatomi Native American leader (c. 1760 – c. 1848)

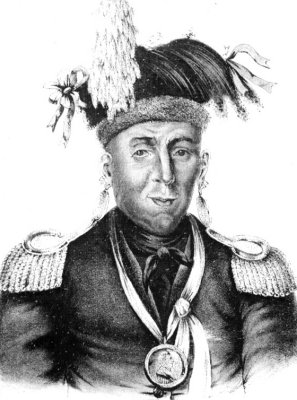
Waubonsie

Waubonsie (c. 1760 – c. 1848) was a leader of the Potawatomi Native American people. His name has been spelled in a variety of ways, including Wabaunsee, Wah-bahn-se, Waubonsee, Waabaanizii in the contemporary Ojibwe language, and Wabanzi in the contemporary Potawatomi language (meaning "He Causes Paleness" in both languages, also cited as meaning “early dawn”)

== Biography ==
The documentary record of Waubonsie's life is sparse. His birth name, parentage, and place of birth are unknown. The year of his birth has been estimated from 1756 to 1765. His brother Mucadapuckee ("Black Partridge") was also a chief. According to tradition, Waubonsie acquired his name (which means "Break of Day" (waaban-izhi) or "He Causes Paleness" (waabaanizii)) after sneaking into a place where some enemy Osages were located, killing and scalping one or more of them, and escaping at daybreak.

During Tecumseh's War and the War of 1812, Waubonsie supported Tecumseh and the British against American expansion. In September 1811, Waubonsie led an attack on one of William Henry Harrison's supply boats as it ascended the Wabash River in Indiana. Waubonsie jumped on the boat, killed the lone American on board, and leapt off before the Americans on the far shore could respond. Waubonsie, Shabonna, and Winamac led Potawatomi warriors against Harrison's troops at the Battle of Tippecanoe on November 7, 1811.

Waubonsie opposed the attack on Fort Dearborn in 1812, and protected the family of John Kinzie during the massacre that followed. After the war, he signed treaties with the United States, and thereafter worked to avoid confrontation with the Americans. With other Potawatomi leaders, in 1827 he refused to join the Winnebago War against the Americans.

When the Black Hawk War erupted in 1832, Waubonsie and other Potawatomi leaders worked to keep their people out of the conflict, but found it difficult to do so. Many white settlers, recalling the Fort Dearborn massacre, distrusted the Potawatomis and assumed that they would join Sauk leader Black Hawk's uprising. Potawatomi leaders worried that the tribe as a whole would be punished if any Potawatomis supported Black Hawk. Waubonsie and Potawatomi chief Shabbona told Black Hawk that they would not come to his aid. Hoping to demonstrate their good intentions to the Americans, the Potawatomis offered military assistance, fielding a force under Billy Caldwell and Waubonsie. They were less than enthusiastic allies, but managed to demonstrate support for the Americans while avoiding battle.

After the war, Waubonsie visited Washington, D.C., on two occasions, and met once with President Andrew Jackson. He signed treaties that sold Potawatomi land in Indiana and Illinois to the United States, and moved westward to Iowa. The U.S. government built Waubonsie a house near Tabor, Iowa, where he died in 1848 or 1849.

Additional sources indicate Chief Waubonsie died as a result of injuries he sustained in a stage coach accident in Ohio, December 1845, upon a return trip from Washington, D.C., another states he died in Booneville, Missouri, as a result of his injuries in early 1846.

== Toponyms and Memorials ==
- Waubonsie State Park, Iowa
- Wabaunsee County, Kansas
- Wabaunsee Township, Kansas
- Wabaunsee Creek, Kansas
- Lake Wabaunsee, Kansas
- Waubonsie Valley High School, Aurora, Illinois
- Waubonsee Community College, Sugar Grove, Illinois
- Wabansia Ave, Chicago, Illinois
- Waubonsee Trail, Batavia, Illinois

USS Waubansee (YTM-366), a United States Navy harbor tug placed in service in 1944 and stricken in 1983, was also named for him.
