= Brandt Hotel =

Historic hotel in Alma, Kansas, U.S.

Coordinates: 39.016°N 96.289°W

- Brandt House
- U.S. National Register of Historic Places
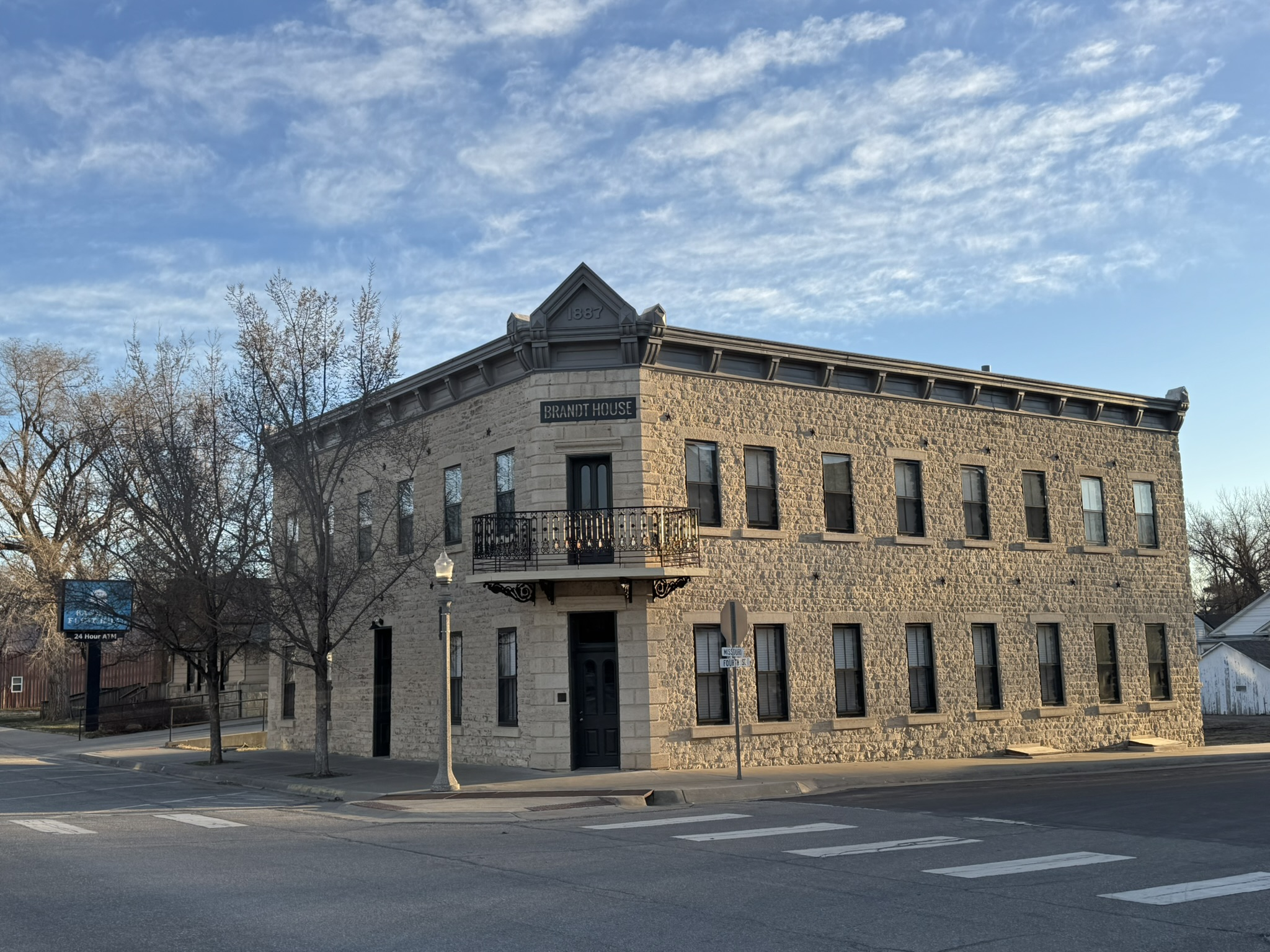
- The Brandt House in 2025

- Location within Kansas Location within the United States
- Location: 402 Missouri Avenue, Alma, Kansas
- Built: 1887
- Architectural style: Italianate
- NRHP reference No.: 08000617
- Added to NRHP: 2008

The Brandt House, formerly known as the Alma Hotel and historically referred to as the Brandt Hotel, is a historic hotel building located at 402 Missouri Avenue in Alma, Kansas, United States. Constructed in 1887, the two-story limestone structure is an example of Italianate architecture typical of late nineteenth-century commercial buildings in the Flint Hills region. The property is listed on both the National Register of Historic Places and the Kansas State Register of Historic Places.

== History ==
The building was constructed in 1887 by Joseph and Christena Brandt to serve travelers and railroad passengers passing through Alma during a period of regional economic growth associated with rail transportation in Wabaunsee County, Kansas. At the time of its opening, the Brandt Hotel was among the largest hotels in the community and served as a central lodging house for visitors and travelers in the region.

The Brandt family moved to Alma in 1884 and initially operated another hotel before constructing the new stone hotel building on Missouri Street in 1887. Contemporary reports described the building as a substantial stone structure with approximately twenty guest rooms located on the upper floor.

Following the death of Joseph Brandt in 1895, the property was sold and later operated by members of the Horne family. In 1897 the establishment became known as the Alma Hotel, a name that remained associated with the building for much of the twentieth century.

The Alma Hotel continued operating under several owners throughout the twentieth century and served as an important part of Alma's historic commercial district.

The building later underwent restoration and rehabilitation and reopened under the historic Brandt name as the Brandt House, preserving the historic structure while returning it to active use.

== Architecture ==
The building is a two-story limestone structure designed in the Italianate architectural style. Notable architectural features include tall arched windows, a decorative pressed-metal cornice, and a prominent corner entrance facing Missouri Avenue. The structure occupies a prominent corner location within Alma's historic downtown commercial district.

== Historic designation ==
The building was listed on the National Register of Historic Places in 2008 in recognition of its architectural significance and its role in the commercial development of Alma, Kansas. The property is also listed on the Kansas State Register of Historic Places.

== See also ==
- National Register of Historic Places listings in Wabaunsee County, Kansas
