= Township 2, Morris County, Kansas =

Township in Morris County, Kansas, U.S.

Township 2
- Township
- Location within Morris County
- Coordinates: 38.715988°N 96.474689°W
- Country: United States
- State: Kansas
- County: Morris

Area
  - Total: 108.806 sq mi (281.81 km^{2})
  - Land: 103.625 sq mi (268.39 km^{2})
  - Water: 5.181 sq mi (13.42 km^{2}) 4.76%

Population (2020)
  - Total: 627
  - Density: 6.05/sq mi (2.34/km^{2})
- Time zone: UTC-6 (CST)
  - Summer (DST): UTC-5 (CDT)
- Area code(s): 620, 785

Township 2 is a township in Morris County, Kansas, United States. As of the 2020 census, its population was 627.

== Geography ==
Township 2 covers an area of 108.806 square miles (281.81 square kilometers). The Neosho River, Wildcat Creek, and Gilmore Creek flow through it. Council Grove Lake lies within the township as well.

=== Adjacent townships ===
- Garfield Township, Wabaunsee County (north)
- Rock Creek Township, Wabaunsee County (northeast)
- Agnes City Township, Lyon County (east)
- Township 1, Morris County (south)
- Township 9, Morris County (southwest)
- Township 4, Morris County (west)
- Township 3, Morris County (northwest)

=== Major highways ===
- US-56
- K-177
