= Stuewe House =

Historic house in Kansas, United States

- U.S. National Register of Historic Places
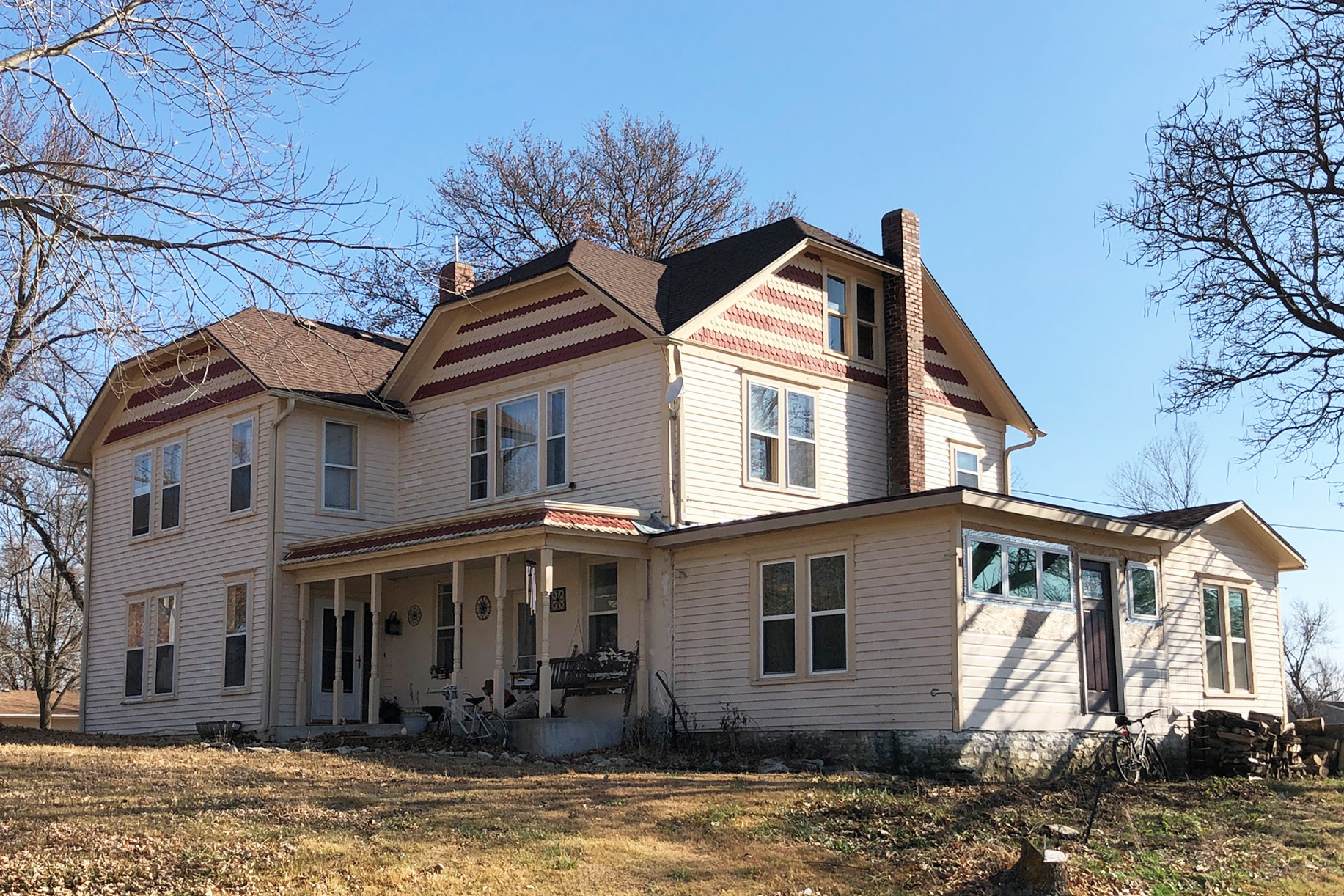

- Location within Kansas Location within the United States
- Location: 617 Nebraska, Alma, Kansas
- Coordinates: 39°00′55″N 96°17′36″W
- Area: 1 acre (0.40 ha)
- Built: 1873
- Architectural style: Folk, National Style
- NRHP reference No.: 06001245
- Added to NRHP: January 17, 2007

The Stuewe House at 617 Nebraska in Alma, Kansas was built in 1873. Also known as the Stuewe Brothers Creamery, it was listed on the National Register of Historic Places in 2007.

It is a 2 1/2-story wood-and-limestone house, built in 1873 and expanded in 1885 and in 1893.
