= Newbury, Kansas =

Unincorporated community in Wabaunsee County, Kansas

- CDP
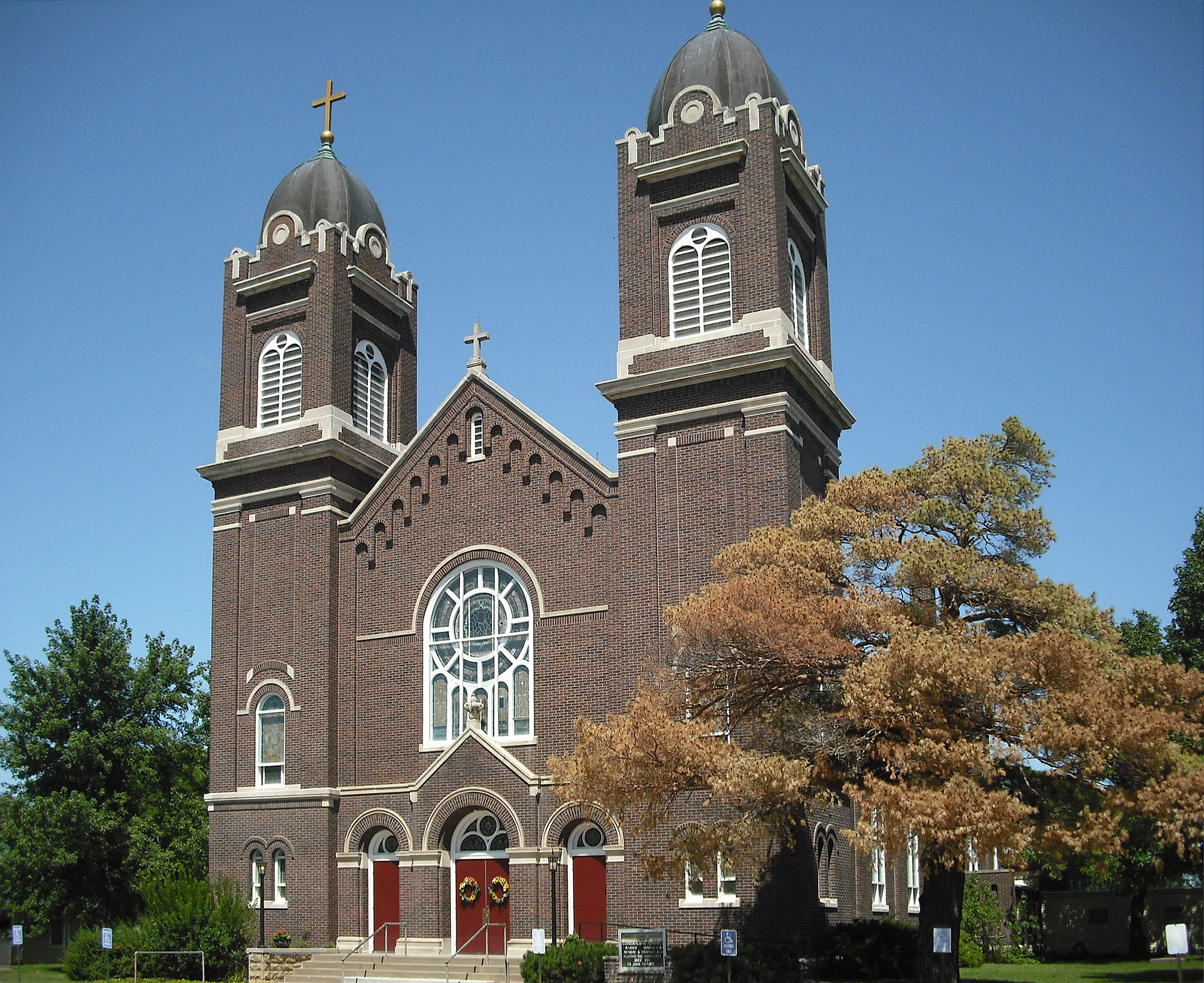
- Sacred Heart Catholic Church (2009)

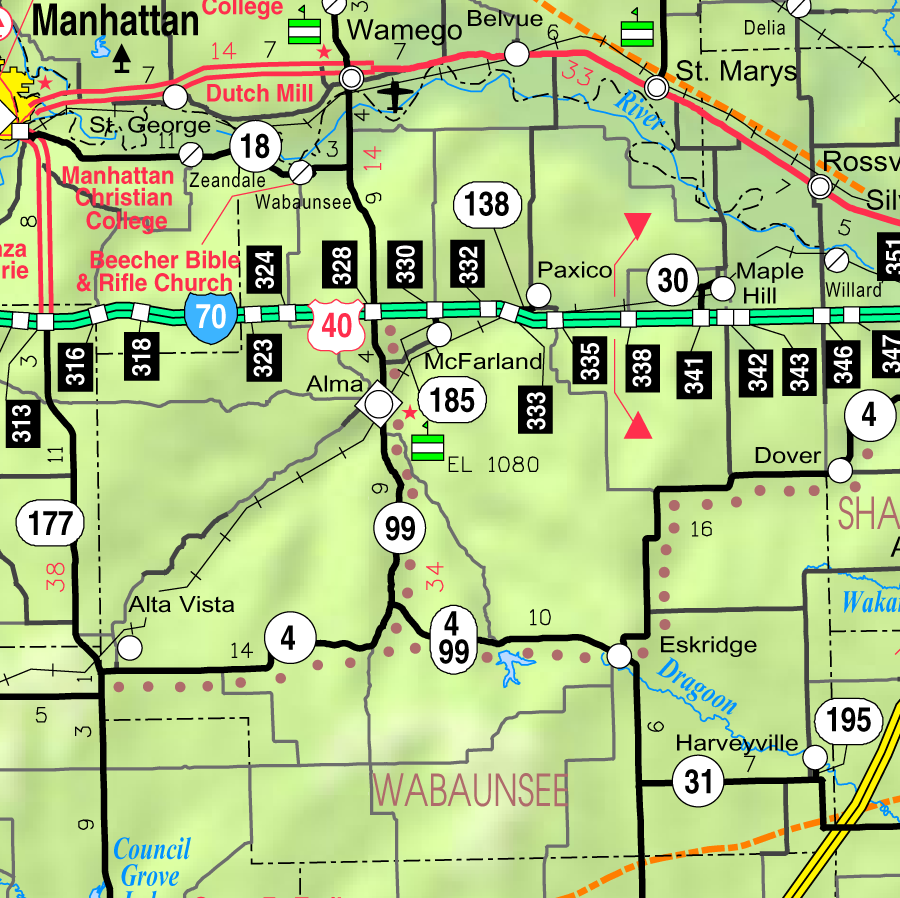
- KDOT map of Wabaunsee County (legend)

- Location within Kansas Location within the United States
- Coordinates: 39°05′05″N 96°10′26″W
- Country: United States
- State: Kansas
- County: Wabaunsee
- Elevation: 1,043 ft (318 m)

Population (2020)
  - Total: 78
- Time zone: UTC-6 (CST)
  - Summer (DST): UTC-5 (CDT)
- Area code: 785
- FIPS code: 20-50250
- GNIS ID: 2804544

Newbury is a census-designated place (CDP) in Wabaunsee County, Kansas, United States. As of the 2020 census, the population was 78. It is located approximately two miles northwest of Paxico.

== History ==
A post office was opened in Newbury in 1870, and remained in operation until it was discontinued in 1888.

== Demographics ==
Historical population
Census	Pop.	Note	%±
2020	78		—
U.S. Decennial Census

The 2020 United States census counted 78 people, 25 households, and 20 families in Newbury. The population density was 86.9 per square mile (33.5/km^{2}). There were 25 housing units at an average density of 27.8 per square mile (10.7/km^{2}). The racial makeup was 100.0% (78) white or European American (97.44% non-Hispanic white), 0.0% (0) black or African-American, 0.0% (0) Native American or Alaska Native, 0.0% (0) Asian, 0.0% (0) Pacific Islander or Native Hawaiian, 0.0% (0) from other races, and 0.0% (0) from two or more races. Hispanic or Latino of any race was 2.56% (2) of the population.

Of the 25 households, 32.0% had children under the age of 18; 76.0% were married couples living together; 4.0% had a female householder with no spouse or partner present. 20.0% of households consisted of individuals and 8.0% had someone living alone who was 65 years of age or older. The percent of those with a bachelor's degree or higher was estimated to be 0.0% of the population.

38.5% of the population was under the age of 18, 10.3% from 18 to 24, 16.7% from 25 to 44, 24.4% from 45 to 64, and 10.3% who were 65 years of age or older. The median age was 31.5 years. For every 100 females, there were 66.0 males. For every 100 females ages 18 and older, there were 84.6 males.

== Education ==
The community is served by Wabaunsee USD 329 public school district.
