= Paxico Historic District =

Historic district in Kansas, United States

- U.S. National Register of Historic Places
- U.S. Historic district
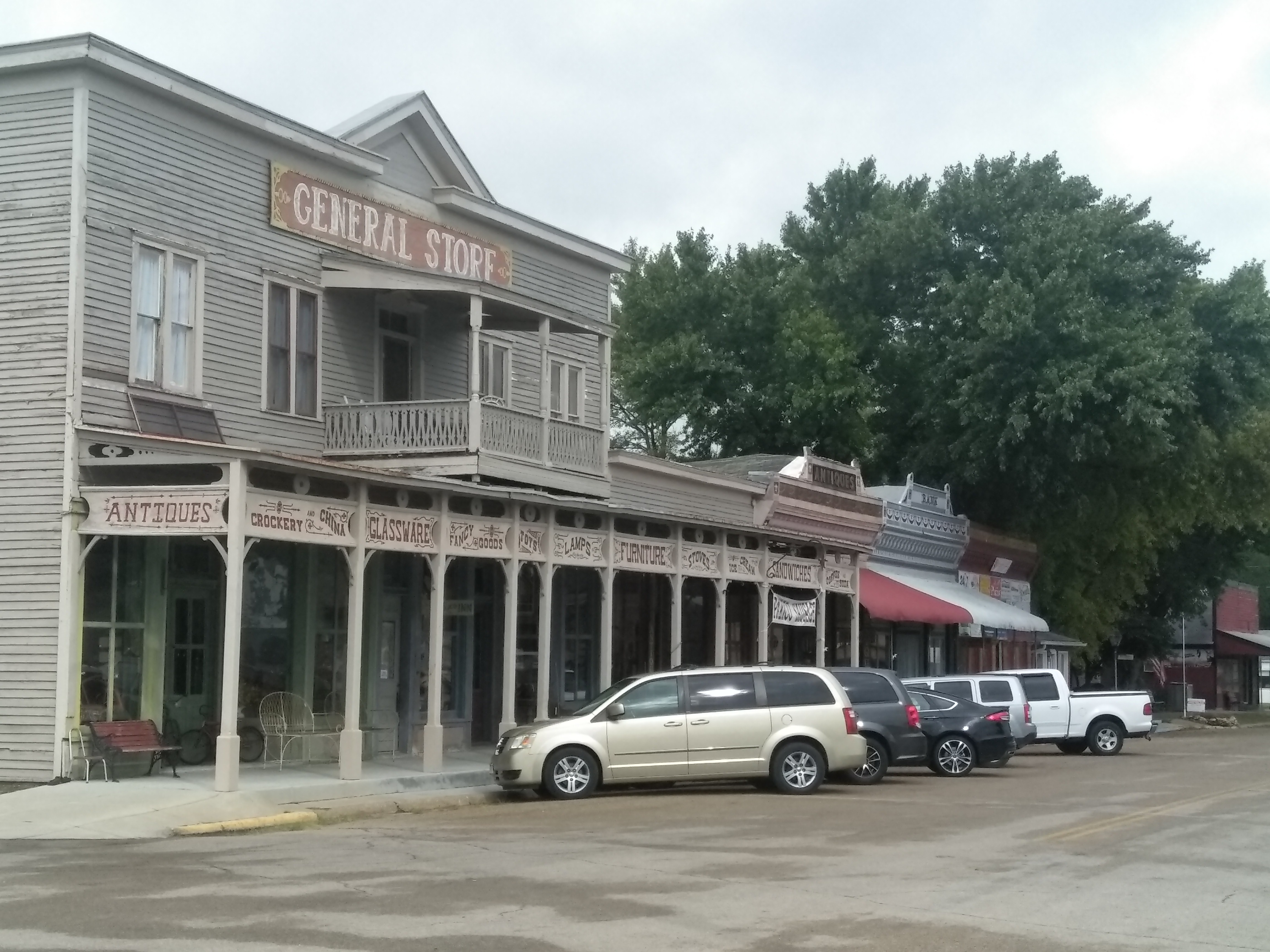

- Location within Kansas Location within the United States
- Location: 101-103,105,107,109 Newbury St., Paxico, Kansas
- Coordinates: 39°03′57″N 96°10′07″W
- Area: less than one acre
- Built: 1907
- Architect: Schilling, F.; Boyer Brothers
- Architectural style: Late Victorian, Folk Victorian
- NRHP reference No.: 98001289
- Added to NRHP: October 30, 1998

The Paxico Historic District includes four commercial contributing buildings in a row at 101–103, 105, 107, and 109 Newbury St. in Paxico, Kansas. The historic district was listed on the National Register of Historic Places in 1998.

The buildings are near the railroad station and Main Street in the T-plan layout of Paxico.

The Bolton Brothers General Store, a two-story building at 101-103 Newbury, is the corner building in the row. It has two main two-story sections and a one-story extension to the north, plus a one-story rear wing.
