= Alma Downtown Historic District (Alma, Kansas) =

Historic district in Kansas, United States

- U.S. National Register of Historic Places
- U.S. Historic district
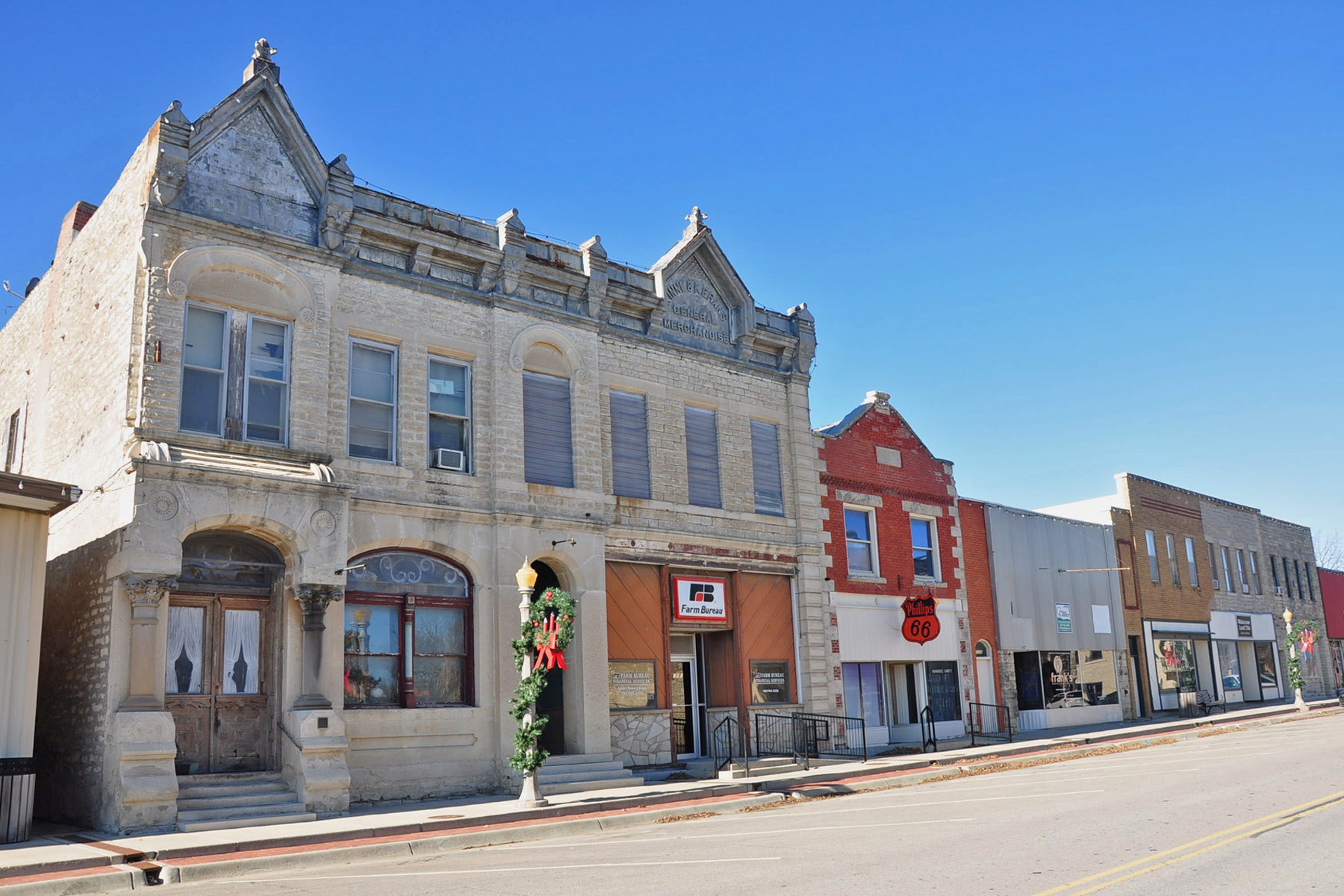

- Location within Kansas Location within the United States
- Location: Missouri St., 2nd to 5th, Alma, Kansas
- Coordinates: 39°0′47″N 96°17′22″W
- Area: 5.6 acres (2.3 ha)
- Built: 1887
- Architectural style: Italianate, Romanesque, Commercial style
- NRHP reference No.: 09000354
- Added to NRHP: November 6, 2009

The Alma Downtown Historic District in Alma, Kansas, a 5.6 acres (2.3 ha) historic district in Alma, Kansas, was listed on the National Register of Historic Places in 2009. It includes 21 contributing buildings.

It is located along Missouri St., from 2nd to 5th Streets, and includes Italianate and other architecture. It includes a post office and a fire station, as well as commercial buildings.

Most of the buildings are two-part or one-part commercial block buildings.
