= USS Waubansee =

Tugboat of the United States Navy

History

United States
- Name: USS Waubansee
- Namesake: Waubansee, a Native American chief
- Builder: Consolidated Shipbuilding Corporation, Morris Heights, New York
- Laid down: 24 April 1944
- Launched: 10 June 1944
- Completed: 11 October 1944
- Acquired: 11 October 1944
- Reclassified: From yard tug, YT-366, to large harbor tug, YTB-366, 15 May 1944; Medium harbor tug (YTM-366) February 1962
- Stricken: 15 April 1983

General characteristics
- Class & type: Sassaba-class harbor tug
- Displacement: 260 tons; 345 tons (full)
- Length: 100 ft 0 in (30.48 m)
- Beam: 25 ft 0 in (7.62 m)
- Draft: 9 ft 7 in (2.92 m) (full)
- Speed: 12 knots (22 km/h; 14 mph)
- Complement: 14

USS Waubansee (YTB-366), originally YT-366, later YTM-366, was a United States Navy harbor tug commissioned in 1944 and stricken in 1983.

Waubansee was laid down as a yard tug on 24 April 1944 at Morris Heights, New York, by the Consolidated Shipbuilding Corporation. While under construction she was reclassified as a large harbor tug and redesignated YTB-366 on 15 May 1944. Launched on 10 June 1944, she was completed and placed in service at the New York Navy Yard, Brooklyn, New York, on 11 October 1944.

After initial service at the Boston Navy Yard in Boston, Massachusetts, Waubansee was reassigned to the Portsmouth Naval Shipyard in Kittery, Maine, on 30 April 1953. Reclassified as a medium harbor tug and redesignated YTM-366 in February 1962, Waubansee operated in the 1st Naval District, providing tug and tow services and pilot assistance.

Taken out of service and placed in reserve in August 1977, Waubensee was berthed at Portsmouth, Virginia.

According to her Dictionary of American Naval Fighting Ships entry, Waubansee was being prepared for reactivation at the time of the entry's publication in the spring of 1979, but there are no available records that confirm a reactivation. She was stricken on 15 April 1983, pending disposal.

In 1983, the Federal government donated the tug to SUNY Maritime College and was rechristened the Domer.
