= Volland, Kansas =

Unincorporated community in Wabaunsee County, Kansas, United States

Coordinates: 38°56′40″N 96°24′16″W

Volland is an unincorporated community in Wabaunsee County, Kansas, United States.

== History ==
A post office was opened in Volland in 1887. It was discontinued in 1955.

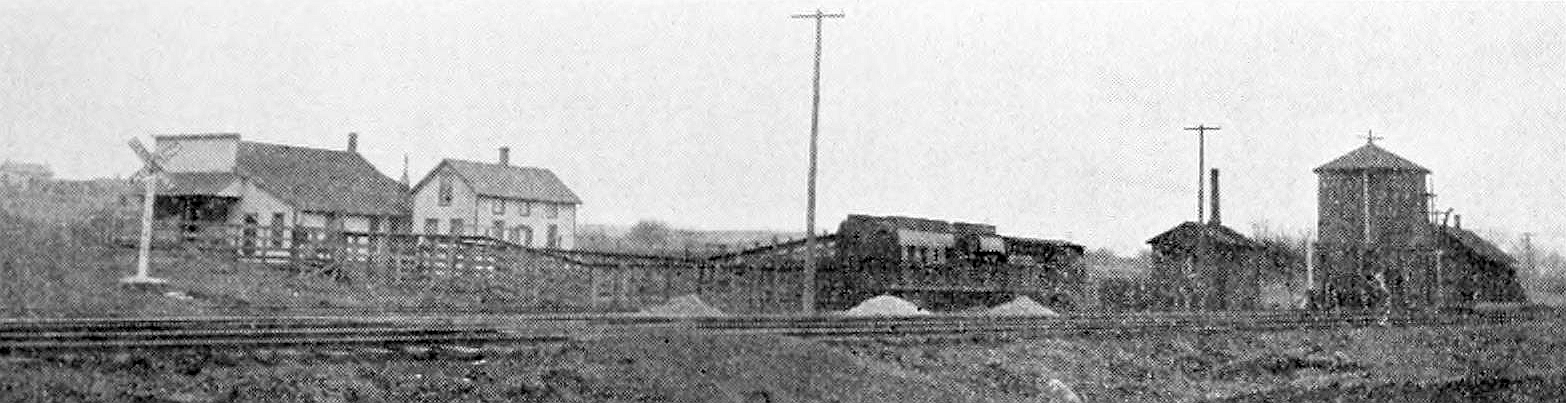
Volland, 1901

== Education ==
The community is served by Wabaunsee USD 329 public school district.
