= Rock Creek Township, Wabaunsee County, Kansas =

Township in Wabaunsee County, Kansas, U.S.

Rock Creek Township
- Township
- Location within Wabaunsee County
- Coordinates: 38.789992°N 96.29193°W
- Country: United States
- State: Kansas
- County: Wabaunsee
- Established: 1872

Government
  - Trustee: John Borg

Area
  - Total: 65.87 sq mi (170.6 km^{2})
  - Land: 65.627 sq mi (169.97 km^{2})
  - Water: 0.243 sq mi (0.63 km^{2}) 0.37%

Population (2020)
  - Total: 45
  - Density: 0.69/sq mi (0.26/km^{2})
- Time zone: UTC-6 (CST)
  - Summer (DST): UTC-5 (CDT)
- Area code: 785
- GNIS feature ID: 476919

Rock Creek Township is a township in Wabaunsee County, Kansas, United States. As of the 2020 census, its population was 45.

== History ==
Rock Creek Township was established in October 1872 from the western part of Wilmington Township. The first settlers in what would become Rock Creek Township were Ed. Baker, W. Cooper, Mr. Zink and J. R. Wolfe, who settled in 1859. The first school in Rock Creek Township was built in 1873.

Rock Creek Township was home to the now-extinct town of Chalk. The town was founded in the 1850s and originally named Chalk Mound after the limestone and chalk-like deposits in the area. The township and town had a significant African American population with the arrival of Exodusters. Most farmers in the township by 1885 were from Indiana, Ohio, and New York. Chalk had a peak population of around 500 people during the 1880s. The down began declining and the post office was closed in 1907, however, organizations and businesses such as Chalk's 4-H club continued well into the 20th century.

== Geography ==
Rock Creek Township covers an area of 65.87 square miles (170.6 km^{2}), 0.37% of it water. The east branch of Munkers Creek flows through it, as well as Rock Creek.

=== Adjacent townships ===
Farmer Township, Wabaunsee County
Garfield Township, Wabaunsee County	northwest	north	northeast	Mill Creek Township, Wabaunsee County
		self	east	Wilmington Township, Wabaunsee County
Township 2, Morris County	southwest	south
Agnes City Township, Lyon County

== Demographics ==
As of the 2020 census, the township had a population of 45, giving a population density of 0.69 people per square mile (0.27 people/km^{2}). The racial makeup of the township was 80.0% White, 4.4% Asian, 2.2% Black of African American, 2.2% from some other race, and 11.1% from two or more races. Hispanics or Latinos of any race were 13.3% of the population.

The 2020–2024 American Community Survey estimated that the township contained 55 households and 55 housing units.
