= McFarland, Kansas =

City in Wabaunsee County, Kansas

- City
- Location within Wabaunsee County and Kansas

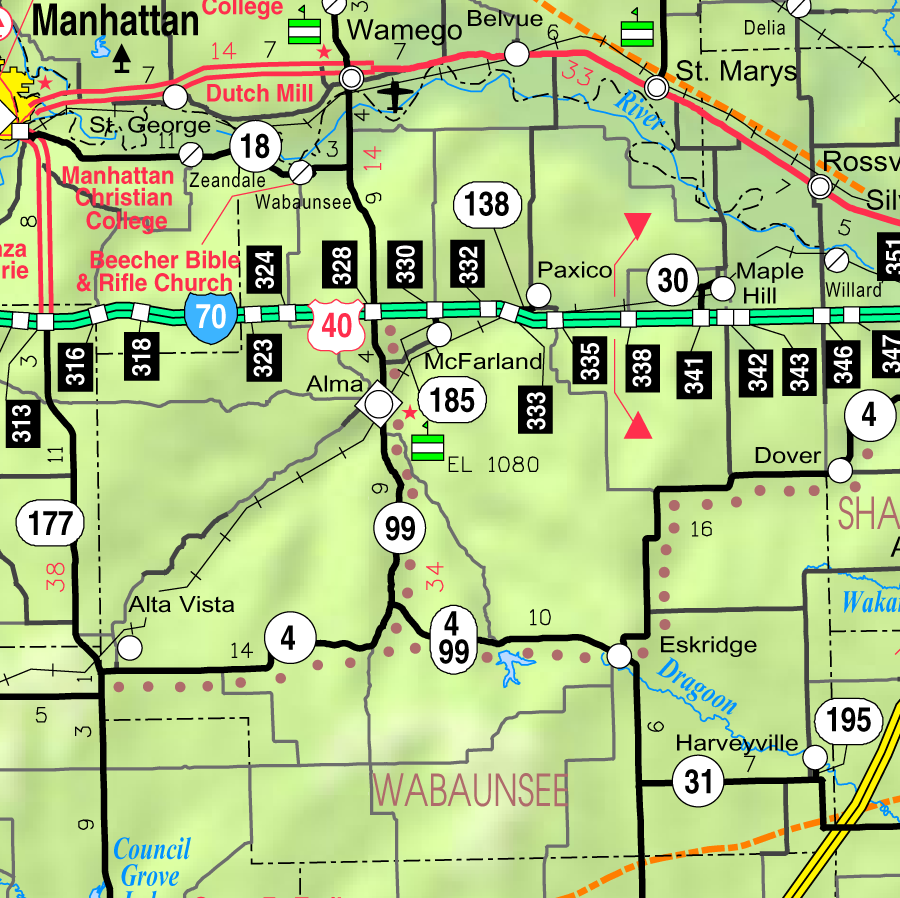
- KDOT map of Wabaunsee County (legend)
- Coordinates: 39°3′12″N 96°14′20″W
- Country: United States
- State: Kansas
- County: Wabaunsee
- Founded: 1887
- Incorporated: 1903

Government
  - Type: Mayor–Council

Area
  - Total: 0.19 sq mi (0.48 km^{2})
  - Land: 0.18 sq mi (0.46 km^{2})
  - Water: 0.0077 sq mi (0.02 km^{2})
- Elevation: 1,020 ft (310 m)

Population (2020)
  - Total: 272
  - Density: 1,500/sq mi (590/km^{2})
- Time zone: UTC-6 (CST)
  - Summer (DST): UTC-5 (CDT)
- ZIP Code: 66501
- Area code: 785
- FIPS code: 20-43775
- GNIS ID: 2395066
- Website: mcfarlandkansas.com

McFarland is a city in Wabaunsee County, Kansas, United States. As of the 2020 census, the population of the city was 272.

== History ==
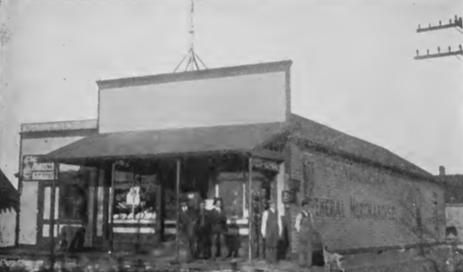
Noller store in McFarland, 1907

McFarland was established in June 1887 by S.H. Fairfield. It was named after J. N. McFarland, a Topeka, Kansas judge and member of the town company.

In 1887, the Chicago, Kansas and Nebraska Railway built a main line from Topeka through McFarland to Herington. The Chicago, Kansas and Nebraska Railway was foreclosed in 1891 and taken over by Chicago, Rock Island and Pacific Railway, which shut down in 1980 and reorganized as Oklahoma, Kansas and Texas Railroad, merged in 1988 with Missouri Pacific Railroad, merged in 1997 with Union Pacific Railroad. Most locals still refer to this railroad as the "Rock Island".

Circa 1910, over 30 passenger trains per day passed through McFarland.

== Geography ==
According to the United States Census Bureau, the city has a total area of 0.19 square miles (0.49 km^{2}), of which 0.18 square miles (0.47 km^{2}) is land and 0.01 square miles (0.03 km^{2}) is water.

=== Climate ===
The climate in this area is characterized by hot, humid summers and generally mild to cool winters. According to the Köppen Climate Classification system, McFarland has a humid subtropical climate, abbreviated "Cfa" on climate maps.

== Demographics ==
Historical population
Census	Pop.	Note	%±
1910	388		—
1920	579		49.2%
1930	399		−31.1%
1940	336		−15.8%
1950	279		−17.0%
1960	256		−8.2%
1970	209		−18.4%
1980	242		15.8%
1990	224		−7.4%
2000	271		21.0%
2010	256		−5.5%
2020	272		6.3%
U.S. Decennial Census

McFarland is part of the Topeka, Kansas Metropolitan Statistical Area.

=== 2020 census ===
The 2020 United States census counted 272 people, 100 households, and 68 families in McFarland. The population density was 1,528.1 per square mile (590.0/km^{2}). There were 121 housing units at an average density of 679.8 per square mile (262.5/km^{2}). The racial makeup was 91.18% (248) white or European American (87.13% non-Hispanic white), 0.0% (0) black or African-American, 0.37% (1) Native American or Alaska Native, 0.74% (2) Asian, 0.0% (0) Pacific Islander or Native Hawaiian, 0.37% (1) from other races, and 7.35% (20) from two or more races. Hispanic or Latino of any race was 6.25% (17) of the population.

Of the 100 households, 35.0% had children under the age of 18; 46.0% were married couples living together; 19.0% had a female householder with no spouse or partner present. 22.0% of households consisted of individuals and 14.0% had someone living alone who was 65 years of age or older. The average household size was 3.0 and the average family size was 3.5. The percent of those with a bachelor's degree or higher was estimated to be 11.4% of the population.

29.4% of the population was under the age of 18, 11.4% from 18 to 24, 23.2% from 25 to 44, 20.2% from 45 to 64, and 15.8% who were 65 years of age or older. The median age was 33.5 years. For every 100 females, there were 87.6 males. For every 100 females ages 18 and older, there were 95.9 males.

The 2016–2020 5-year American Community Survey estimates show that the median household income was $54,479 (with a margin of error of +/- $23,605) and the median family income was $61,667 (+/- $26,029). Males had a median income of $34,500 (+/- $14,742) versus $16,701 (+/- $4,197) for females. The median income for those above 16 years old was $24,625 (+/- $12,791). Approximately, 3.3% of families and 3.3% of the population were below the poverty line, including 6.3% of those under the age of 18 and 3.3% of those ages 65 or over.

=== 2010 census ===
As of the census of 2010, there were 256 people, 110 households, and 68 families residing in the city. The population density was 1,422.2 inhabitants per square mile (549.1/km^{2}). There were 123 housing units at an average density of 683.3 per square mile (263.8/km^{2}). The racial makeup of the city was 95.7% White, 0.4% Native American, 0.8% from other races, and 3.1% from two or more races. Hispanic or Latino of any race were 4.7% of the population.

There were 110 households, of which 30.0% had children under the age of 18 living with them, 48.2% were married couples living together, 9.1% had a female householder with no husband present, 4.5% had a male householder with no wife present, and 38.2% were non-families. 31.8% of all households were made up of individuals, and 12.7% had someone living alone who was 65 years of age or older. The average household size was 2.33 and the average family size was 3.00.

The median age in the city was 40.5 years. 21.9% of residents were under the age of 18; 8.6% were between the ages of 18 and 24; 24.3% were from 25 to 44; 30.5% were from 45 to 64; and 14.8% were 65 years of age or older. The gender makeup of the city was 54.3% male and 45.7% female.

=== 2000 census ===
As of the census of 2000, there were 271 people, 105 households, and 72 families residing in the city. The population density was 1,525.6 inhabitants per square mile (589.0/km^{2}). There were 115 housing units at an average density of 647.4 per square mile (250.0/km^{2}). The racial makeup of the city was 98.15% White, 0.37% African American, and 1.48% from two or more races. Hispanic or Latino of any race were 1.11% of the population.

There were 105 households, out of which 35.2% had children under the age of 18 living with them, 54.3% were married couples living together, 7.6% had a female householder with no husband present, and 30.5% were non-families. 22.9% of all households were made up of individuals, and 6.7% had someone living alone who was 65 years of age or older. The average household size was 2.58 and the average family size was 3.05.

In the city, the population was spread out, with 31.0% under the age of 18, 5.9% from 18 to 24, 30.3% from 25 to 44, 20.7% from 45 to 64, and 12.2% who were 65 years of age or older. The median age was 36 years. For every 100 females, there were 105.3 males. For every 100 females age 18 and over, there were 98.9 males.

The median income for a household in the city was $32,250, and the median income for a family was $45,250. Males had a median income of $31,250 versus $23,173 for females. The per capita income for the city was $15,419. About 7.1% of families and 11.1% of the population were below the poverty line, including 9.9% of those under the age of eighteen and 11.5% of those 65 or over.

== Education ==
The community is served by Wabaunsee USD 329 public school district. USD 329 was formed by school unification that consolidated Alma, Maple Hill, McFarland, and Paxico.
