= Wabaunsee Township, Kansas =

Township in Wabaunsee County, Kansas, U.S.

Wabaunsee Township
- Township
- Location within Wabaunsee County
- Coordinates: 39.114661°N 96.306433°W
- Country: United States
- State: Kansas
- County: Wabaunsee
- Established: 1859

Government
  - Trustee: Jesse Gehrt

Area
  - Total: 67.005 sq mi (173.54 km^{2})
  - Land: 66.233 sq mi (171.54 km^{2})
  - Water: 0.772 sq mi (2.00 km^{2}) 1.15%

Population (2020)
  - Total: 579
  - Density: 8.74/sq mi (3.38/km^{2})
- Time zone: UTC-6 (CST)
  - Summer (DST): UTC-5 (CDT)
- Area code: 785
- GNIS feature ID: 476418

Wabaunsee Township is a township in Wabaunsee County, Kansas, United States. As of the 2020 census, its population was 579.

== History ==
Wabaunsee County was organized on March 25, 1859. The first townships were organized the same day, among them, Wabaunsee Township. The first settler in what would become Wabaunsee Township was Peter Sharai, who settled in 1854. The first school in Wabaunsee Township was built in 1857.

== Geography ==
Wabaunsee Township covers an area of 67.005 square miles (173.54 km^{2}), 1.15% of it water. The Kansas River flows through it, as well as Deep Creek, Antelope Creek, Wells Creek, Hendricks Creek, Pretty Creek, and Paw Paw Creek.

=== Communities ===
- part of Wamego
- Wabaunsee

=== Adjacent townships ===
Wamego Township, Pottawatomie County
St. George Township, Pottawatomie County	northwest	north	northeast	Kaw Township, Wabaunsee County
Zeandale Township, Riley County	west	self
		south	southeast	Newbury Township, Wabaunsee County
Alma Township, Wabaunsee County

== Transportation ==
=== Major highways ===
- I-70
- US-40
- K-18
- K-99

== Demographics ==
As of the 2020 census, the township had a population of 579, giving a population density of 8.74 people per square mile (3.37 people/km^{2}). The racial makeup of the township was 93.8% White, 1.2% Black of African American, 0.5% Native American, 0.2% from some other race, and 4.3% from two or more races. Hispanics or Latinos of any race were 2.4% of the population.

The 2020–2024 American Community Survey estimated that the township contained 168 households and 175 housing units.
