= Wabaunsee USD 329 =

Public school district in Alma, Kansas

Address
- 213 E. 9th St. Alma, Kansas, 66401; United States
- Coordinates: 39.0188°N 96.2876°W

District information
- Type: Public
- Grades: K to 12
- Superintendent: Troy Pitsch
- Schools: 3

Other information
- Website: usd329.com

Wabaunsee USD 329 is a public unified school district headquartered in Alma, Kansas, United States. The district includes the communities of Alma, Maple Hill, McFarland, Newbury, Paxico, Volland, and nearby rural areas.

== Schools ==
The school district operates the following schools:

- Wabaunsee High School
- Wabaunsee Junior High
- Wabaunsee Elementary School

Former schools:

- Maple Hill Elementary School

== Sports ==
Sports in the middle and junior high include volleyball, wrestling, cross country, girls basketball, boys basketball, and track & field. Sports in the high school include cross country, football, tennis, volleyball, wrestling, cheerleading, baseball, softball and track & field.

== History ==
In 2016, Mill Creek Valley USD 329 was renamed to Wabaunsee USD 329.

== See also ==
- Kansas State Department of Education
- Kansas State High School Activities Association
- List of high schools in Kansas
- List of unified school districts in Kansas
