= Waubonsie State Park =

State park in Fremont County, Iowa

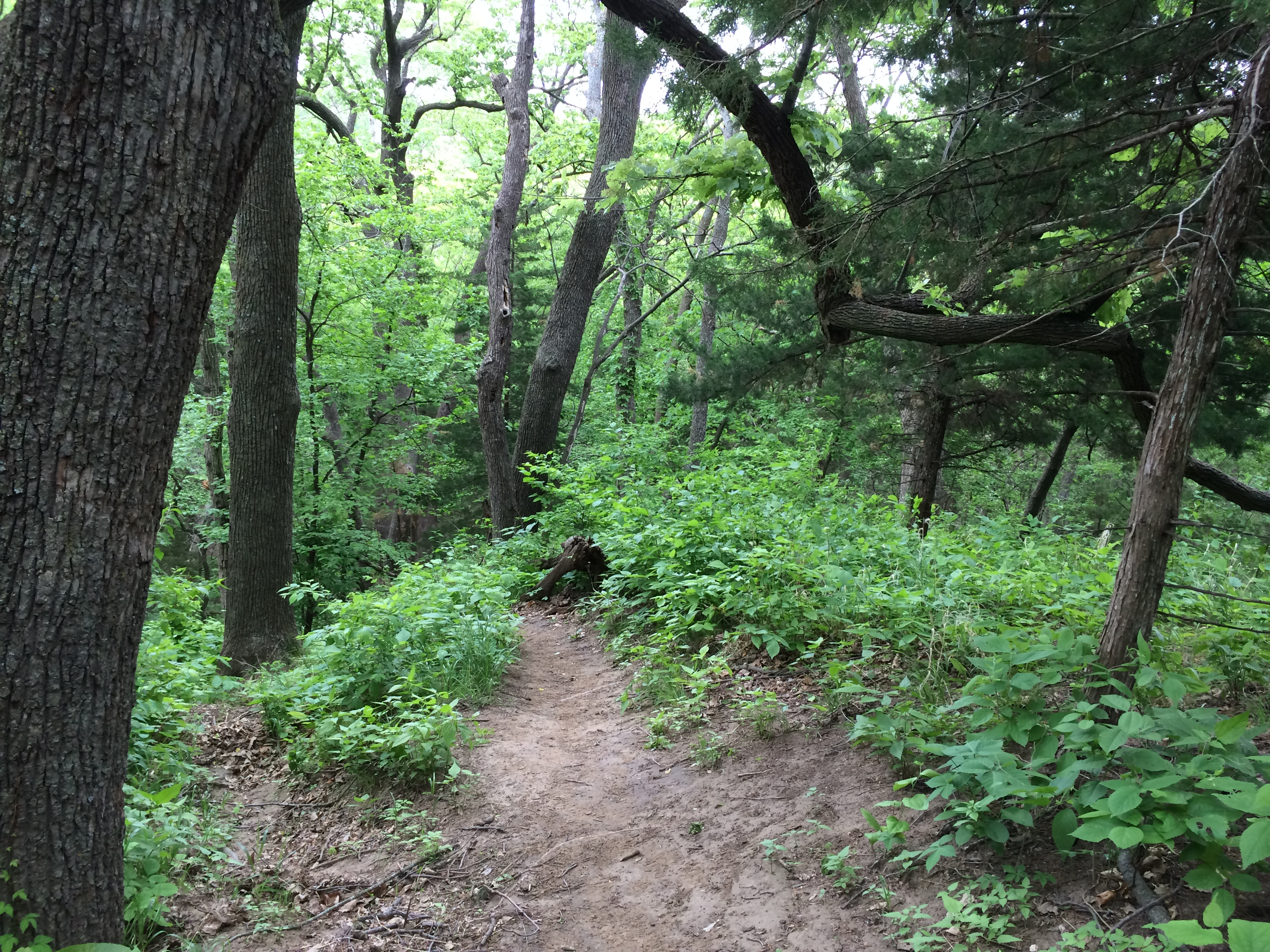

- Location within Iowa Location within the United States
- Location: Fremont County, Iowa, United States
- Coordinates: 40°40′20″N 95°41′18″W
- Area: 2,058 acres (833 ha)
- Elevation: 1,099 ft (335 m)
- Established: 1926
- Administrator: Iowa Department of Natural Resources
- Named for: Chief Wabaunsee
- Website: Official website

Waubonsie State Park is a state park in Fremont County, Iowa, United States, located in the Loess Hills region. It is named for Chief Wabaunsee of the Potawatomi people.

Waubonsie State Park is located in the unique Loess Hills, a landform found only along the Missouri River in Iowa and Missouri. As glaciers melted 14,000 to 28,000 years ago, the Missouri River became a major channel for huge volumes of water and sediment during the summer. In winter, the volume of the meltwater was reduced, leaving the deposited sediments exposed to the wind. These sediments of silt, clay and very fine sand particles called "loess," were then carried by strong westerly winds and deposited when these winds encountered the steep slopes of the east valley wall.

There are several distinctive features of loess hills topography. Because of the fine texture of the soil, deep, steep-sided and very narrow ridge tops have been eroded in the hills. Small, step-like terraces called "cat steps" resulting from repeated slipping of the soil can be seen on many west-facing slopes. Since the soil drains rapidly, nearly vertical cuts can be made in the soil without erosion. The unique topography of the park resembles the "badlands" of the west and harbors plants like the yucca which are normally found in more arid climates.

== Facilities ==
The park offers picnicking, a scenic picnic shelter, and camping. There are 4 miles (6.4 km) of foot trails and 5 miles (8.0 km) of equestrian trails winding along ridges down into gorges and valleys. The Sunset Ridge Interpretive Trail provides information about the park's plants and trees. Waubonsie State Park is a site on the Lewis and Clark National Historic Trail.
