= Mill Creek Township, Wabaunsee County, Kansas =

Township in Wabaunsee County, Kansas, U.S.

Mill Creek Township
- Township
- Location within Wabaunsee County
- Coordinates: 38.887302°N 96.164303°W
- Country: United States
- State: Kansas
- County: Wabaunsee
- Established: 1872

Government
  - Trustee: Matt Anderson

Area
  - Total: 74.494 sq mi (192.94 km^{2})
  - Land: 74.006 sq mi (191.67 km^{2})
  - Water: 0.488 sq mi (1.26 km^{2}) 0.66%

Population (2020)
  - Total: 234
  - Density: 3.16/sq mi (1.22/km^{2})
- Time zone: UTC-6 (CST)
  - Summer (DST): UTC-5 (CDT)
- Area code: 785
- GNIS feature ID: 476751

Mill Creek Township is a township in Wabaunsee County, Kansas, United States. As of the 2020 census, its population was 234.

== History ==
Mill Creek Township was established in October 1872 from part of Alma Township. The first settlers in what would become Mill Creek Township were Henry Schmidt, William Drebing, B. Cline, and J. Metzgar, who settled in 1856. The first school to be established in the township was built in 1862.

== Geography ==
Mill Creek Township covers an area of 74.494 square miles (192.94 km^{2}), 0.66% of it water. Lake Wabaunsee lies within the township. Mill Creek's east branch, Nehring Creek, and Kuenzli Creek flow through it as well.

=== Adjacent townships ===
Newbury Township, Wabaunsee County
Alma Township, Wabaunsee County	northwest	north
Farmer Township, Wabaunsee County	west	self	east	Mission Creek Township, Wabaunsee County
Rock Creek Township, Wabaunsee County	southwest		southeast	Wilmington Township, Wabaunsee County

== Transportation ==
=== Major highways ===
- K-4

== Demographics ==
As of the 2020 census, the township had a population of 234, giving a population density of 3.16 people per square mile (1.22 people/km^{2}). The racial makeup of the township was 91.0% White, 1.3% from some other race, and 7.7% from two or more races. Hispanics or Latinos of any race were 6.4% of the population.

The 2020–2024 American Community Survey estimated that the township contained 82 households and 241 housing units.
