= Security State Bank (Eskridge, Kansas) =

- U.S. National Register of Historic Places
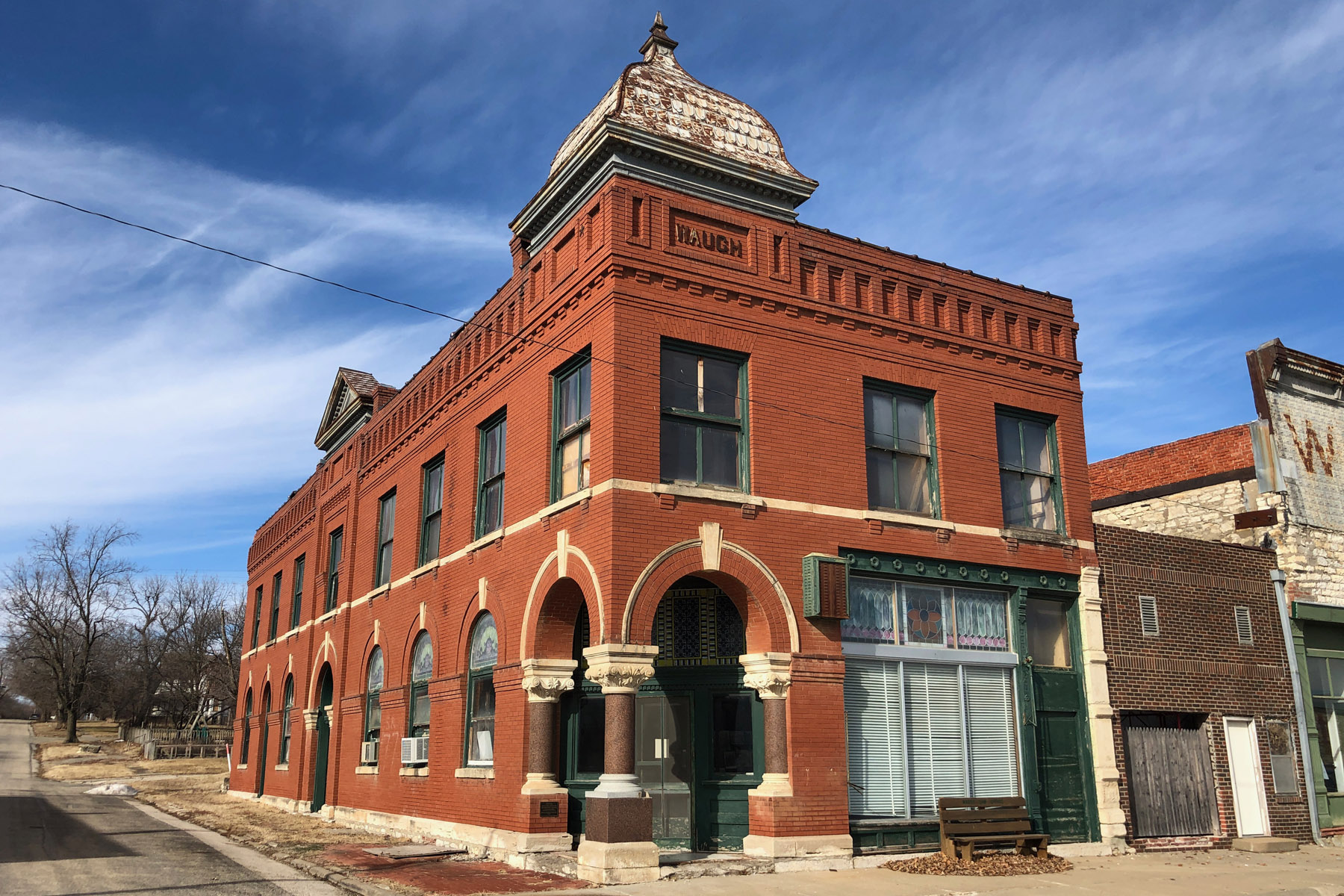

- Location within Kansas Location within the United States
- Location: Main and 2nd Sts. Eskridge, Kansas
- Coordinates: 38°51′35″N 96°6′29″W
- Area: 0.1 acres (0.040 ha)
- Built: 1906
- Built by: E.L. Hopkins, K.O. Ericsson,
- Architectural style: Romanesque
- NRHP reference No.: 82002678
- Added to NRHP: May 6, 1982

The Security State Bank in Eskridge, Kansas is a bank building built in 1906 with a Romanesque style entrance corner. It was listed on the National Register of Historic Places in 1982.

It was built by E.L. Hopkins with stone-masonry work by K.O. Ericsson. In 1982, it was considered the most prominent building in Eskridge.
