= Farmer Township, Wabaunsee County, Kansas =

Township in Wabaunsee County, Kansas, U.S.

Farmer Township
- Township
- Location within Wabaunsee County
- Coordinates: 38.932366°N 96.309651°W
- Country: United States
- State: Kansas
- County: Wabaunsee
- Established: 1873

Government
  - Trustee: David Savage

Area
  - Total: 66.296 sq mi (171.71 km^{2})
  - Land: 66.137 sq mi (171.29 km^{2})
  - Water: 0.159 sq mi (0.41 km^{2}) 0.24%

Population (2020)
  - Total: 83
  - Density: 1.3/sq mi (0.48/km^{2})
- Time zone: UTC-6 (CST)
  - Summer (DST): UTC-5 (CDT)
- Area code: 785
- GNIS feature ID: 476750

Farmer Township is a township in Wabaunsee County, Kansas, United States. As of the 2020 census, its population was 83.

== History ==
Farmer Township was established in September 1873 from part of Alma Township. The first settler in what would become Farmer Township was J. P. Gleich, in 1853. The first school in what would become Farmer Township was built in 1862.

== Geography ==
Farmer Township covers an area of 66.296 square miles (171.71 km^{2}), 0.24% of it water. Mill Creek, Illinois Creek, and Spring Creek flow through it.

=== Adjacent townships ===
Alma Township, Wabaunsee County
Washington Township, Wabaunsee County	northwest	north	northeast	Newbury Township, Wabaunsee County
		self	east	Mill Creek Township, Wabaunsee County
Garfield Township, Wabaunsee County	southwest	south
Rock Creek Township, Wabaunsee County

== Transportation ==
=== Major highways ===
- K-4
- K-99

== Demographics ==
As of the 2020 census, the township had a population of 83, giving a population density of 1.3 people per square mile (0.50 people/km^{2}). The racial makeup of the township was 91.6% White, 1.2% Black or African American, and 7.2% from two or more races.

The 2020–2024 American Community Survey estimated that the township contained 54 households and 54 housing units.
