= Liberty Township, Geary County, Kansas =

Liberty Township
- Township
- Location in Geary County
- Coordinates: 38°54′50″N 096°36′11″W
- Country: United States
- State: Kansas
- County: Geary

Area
  - Total: 65.87 sq mi (170.61 km^{2})
  - Land: 65.85 sq mi (170.56 km^{2})
  - Water: 0.019 sq mi (0.05 km^{2}) 0.03%
- Elevation: 1,342 ft (409 m)

Population (2020)
  - Total: 185
  - Density: 2.81/sq mi (1.08/km^{2})
- GNIS feature ID: 0476723

Liberty Township is a township in Geary County, Kansas, United States. As of the 2020 census, its population was 185.

== History ==
Liberty Township was organized in 1875.

== Geography ==
Liberty Township covers an area of 65.87 square miles (170.6 km^{2}) and contains no incorporated settlements. According to the USGS, it contains five cemeteries: Moss Springs, Olson, Quaker, Upper Humboldt and Welcome.

The streams of East Branch Humboldt Creek, West Branch Davis Creek, West Branch Dry Creek and West Branch Humboldt Creek run through this township.
