= Lake Wabaunsee =

- Location within Kansas Location within the United States
- Location: Wabaunsee County, Kansas
- Coordinates: 38°51′47″N 96°11′35″W
- Type: man-made lake
- Basin countries: United States
- Surface elevation: 1,286 ft (392 m)

Lake Wabaunsee is a man-made lake in Wabaunsee County, Kansas.

Development of the site began in 1933, when the Kansas Emergency Relief Corporation established a work camp at the site. Digging of the lake was taken over by the Federal Works Progress Administration (WPA) in 1936. Construction was completed in 1937, and the lake was purchased by the city of Eskridge.
