= Alma, Kansas =

City in Wabaunsee County, Kansas

- City and County seat
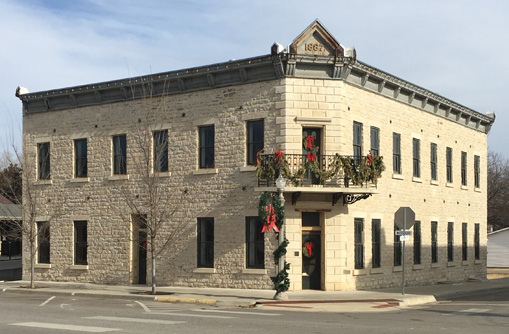
- Brandt Hotel (2017)
- Nickname: "City of Native Stone Set in the Flinthills"
- Location within Wabaunsee County and Kansas

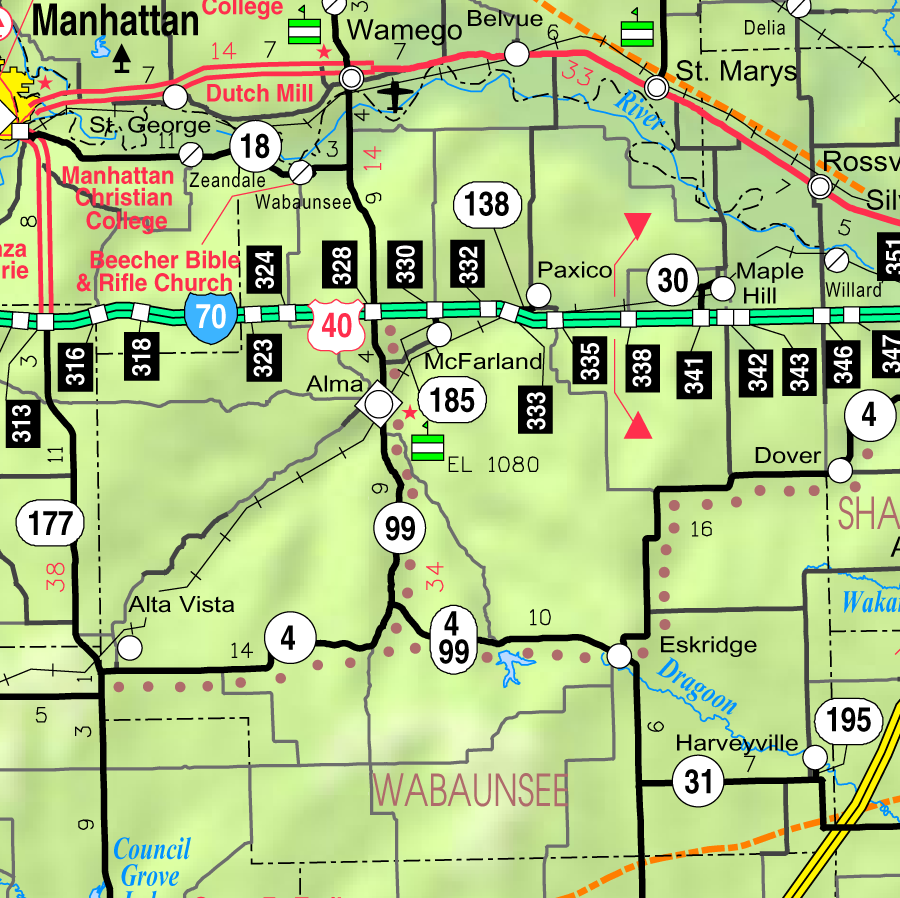
- KDOT map of Wabaunsee County (legend)
- Coordinates: 39°0′55″N 96°17′14″W
- Country: United States
- State: Kansas
- County: Wabaunsee
- Founded: 1867
- Incorporated: 1869

Government
  - Type: Mayor–Council
  - Mayor: Kenneth Smith

Area
  - Total: 0.60 sq mi (1.55 km^{2})
  - Land: 0.58 sq mi (1.51 km^{2})
  - Water: 0.015 sq mi (0.04 km^{2})
- Elevation: 1,096 ft (334 m)

Population (2020)
  - Total: 802
  - Density: 1,380/sq mi (531/km^{2})
- Time zone: UTC-6 (CST)
  - Summer (DST): UTC-5 (CDT)
- ZIP Codes: 66401, 66501
- Area code: 785
- FIPS code: 20-01350
- GNIS ID: 2393926
- Website: cityofalmaks.gov

Alma (/ˈælmə/ AL-mə) is a city in and the county seat of Wabaunsee County, Kansas, United States. As of the 2020 census, the population of the city was 802.

== History ==
=== 19th century ===
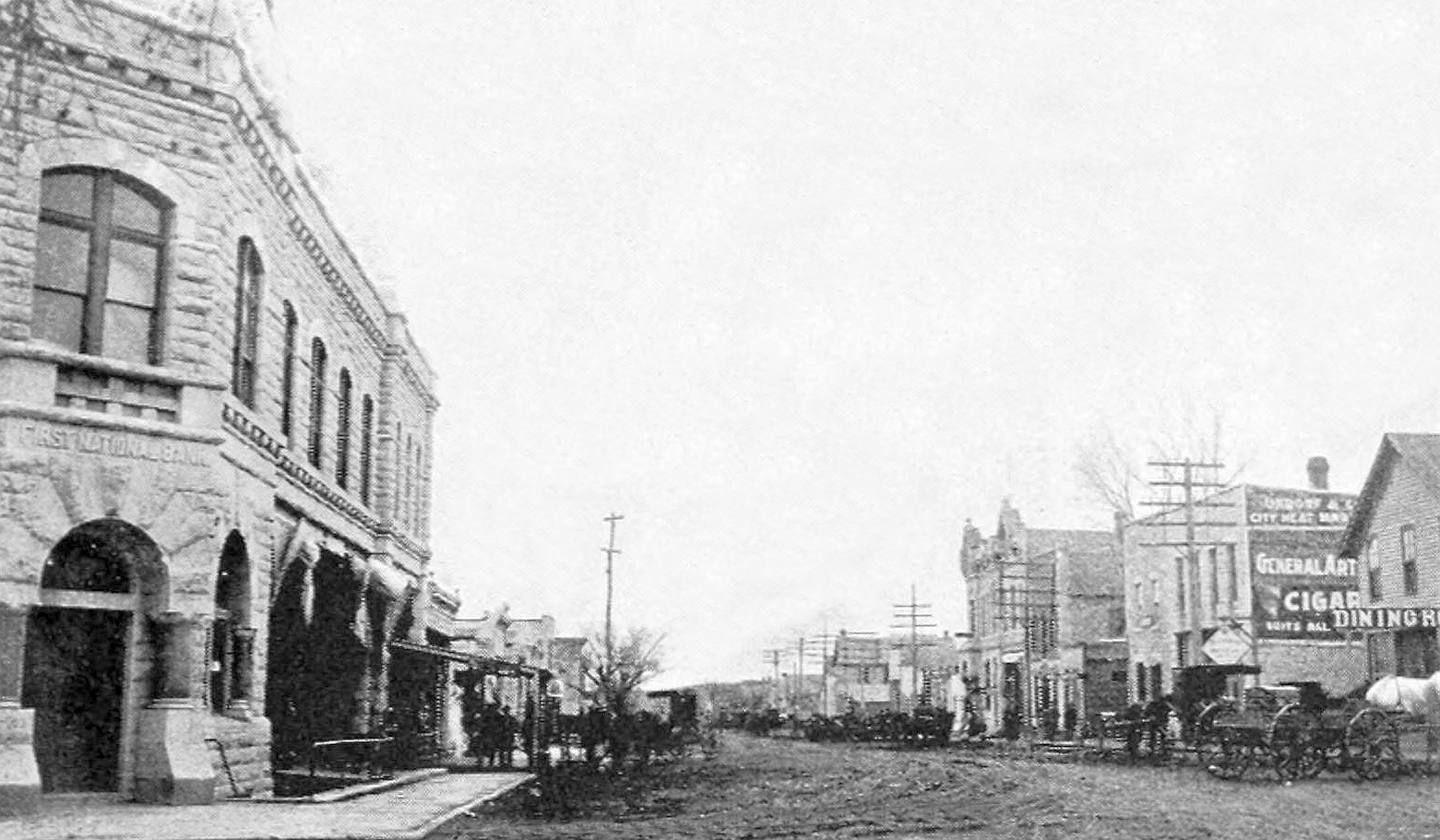
Missouri Street in Alma (1901)

For millennia, the land now known as Kansas was inhabited by Native Americans. In 1803, most of modern Kansas was secured by the United States as part of the Louisiana Purchase. In 1854, the Kansas Territory was organized, then in 1861 Kansas became the 34th U.S. state. In 1859, Wabaunsee County was founded.

The first house was built at Alma in 1867.

In 1887, the Chicago, Kansas and Nebraska Railway built a main line from Topeka through Alma to Herington. The Chicago, Kansas and Nebraska Railway was foreclosed in 1891 and taken over by Chicago, Rock Island and Pacific Railway, which shut down in 1980. This line of the former Rock Island Railroad was sold to the Southern Pacific Railroad and later merged into the Union Pacific that operates and owns the line today. Most locals still refer to this railroad as the "Rock Island".

The city was named after either the city of Alma, Germany, or for a stream in Ukraine.

== Geography ==
According to the United States Census Bureau, the city has a total area of 0.59 square miles (1.53 km^{2}), of which 0.58 square miles (1.50 km^{2}) is land and 0.01 square miles (0.03 km^{2}) is water.

== Demographics ==
Historical population
Census	Pop.	Note	%±
1880	362		—
1890	1,125		210.8%
1900	966		−14.1%
1910	1,010		4.6%
1920	789		−21.9%
1930	811		2.8%
1940	776		−4.3%
1950	716		−7.7%
1960	838		17.0%
1970	905		8.0%
1980	925		2.2%
1990	871		−5.8%
2000	797		−8.5%
2010	832		4.4%
2020	802		−3.6%
U.S. Decennial Census

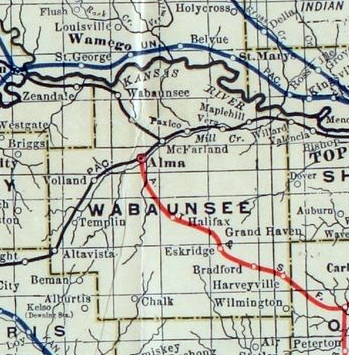
1915 railroad map of Wabaunsee County

Alma is part of the Topeka metropolitan area.

=== 2020 census ===
The 2020 United States census counted 802 people, 324 households, and 199 families in Alma. The population density was 1,370.9 per square mile (529.3/km^{2}). There were 357 housing units at an average density of 610.3 per square mile (235.6/km^{2}). The racial makeup was 90.65% (727) white or European American (88.9% non-Hispanic white), 0.12% (1) black or African-American, 0.25% (2) Native American or Alaska Native, 0.5% (4) Asian, 0.0% (0) Pacific Islander or Native Hawaiian, 0.75% (6) from other races, and 7.73% (62) from two or more races. Hispanic or Latino of any race was 6.23% (50) of the population.

Of the 324 households, 25.9% had children under the age of 18; 49.7% were married couples living together; 25.6% had a female householder with no spouse or partner present. 33.0% of households consisted of individuals and 17.6% had someone living alone who was 65 years of age or older. The average household size was 2.4 and the average family size was 3.1. The percent of those with a bachelor's degree or higher was estimated to be 14.3% of the population.

24.1% of the population was under the age of 18, 6.4% from 18 to 24, 21.8% from 25 to 44, 25.1% from 45 to 64, and 22.7% who were 65 years of age or older. The median age was 42.4 years. For every 100 females, there were 105.6 males. For every 100 females ages 18 and older, there were 111.5 males.

The 2016–2020 5-year American Community Survey estimates show that the median household income was $56,667 (with a margin of error of +/- $17,369) and the median family income was $76,250 (+/- $10,537). Males had a median income of $38,214 (+/- $9,356) versus $31,458 (+/- $5,790) for females. The median income for those above 16 years old was $33,700 (+/- $7,145). Approximately, 3.0% of families and 5.3% of the population were below the poverty line, including 11.3% of those under the age of 18 and 4.9% of those ages 65 or over.

=== 2010 census ===
As of the census of 2010, there were 832 people, 342 households, and 212 families residing in the city. The population density was 1,434.5 inhabitants per square mile (553.9/km^{2}). There were 381 housing units at an average density of 656.9 per square mile (253.6/km^{2}). The racial makeup of the city was 96.4% White, 0.1% African American, 1.0% Native American, 0.2% from other races, and 2.3% from two or more races. Hispanic or Latino of any race were 3.7% of the population.

There were 342 households, of which 30.1% had children under the age of 18 living with them, 51.5% were married couples living together, 7.3% had a female householder with no husband present, 3.2% had a male householder with no wife present, and 38.0% were non-families. 34.5% of all households were made up of individuals, and 19.5% had someone living alone who was 65 years of age or older. The average household size was 2.35 and the average family size was 3.03.

The median age in the city was 42.7 years. 24.3% of residents were under the age of 18; 6.7% were between the ages of 18 and 24; 21.2% were from 25 to 44; 26.2% were from 45 to 64; and 21.5% were 65 years of age or older. The gender makeup of the city was 46.8% male and 53.2% female.

=== 2000 census ===
As of the census of 2000, there were 797 people, 315 households, and 208 families residing in the city. The population density was 1,410.3 inhabitants per square mile (544.5/km^{2}). There were 354 housing units at an average density of 626.4 per square mile (241.9/km^{2}). The racial makeup of the city was 96.86% White, 0.63% African American, 0.25% Native American, 0.63% from other races, and 1.63% from two or more races. Hispanic or Latino of any race were 3.26% of the population.

There were 315 households, out of which 28.6% had children under the age of 18 living with them, 54.6% were married couples living together, 8.3% had a female householder with no husband present, and 33.7% were non-families. 31.7% of all households were made up of individuals, and 17.5% had someone living alone who was 65 years of age or older. The average household size was 2.37 and the average family size was 2.94.

In the city, the population was spread out, with 24.3% under the age of 18, 6.6% from 18 to 24, 23.5% from 25 to 44, 22.1% from 45 to 64, and 23.5% who were 65 years of age or older. The median age was 42 years. For every 100 females, there were 90.7 males. For every 100 females age 18 and over, there were 90.2 males.

The median income for a household in the city was $38,333, and the median income for a family was $46,339. Males had a median income of $31,750 versus $21,094 for females. The per capita income for the city was $16,245. About 4.7% of families and 4.8% of the population were below the poverty line, including 3.0% of those under age 18 and 8.2% of those age 65 or over.

== Education ==
The community is served by Wabaunsee USD 329 public school district. USD 329 was formed by school unification that consolidated Alma, Maple Hill, McFarland, and Paxico. Wabaunsee High School is located in Alma. The Wabaunsee High School mascot is Wabaunsee Chargers.

Alma High School was closed through school unification. The Alma High School mascot was Blue Devils.

== Area events ==
- Hot Alma Nights is held on the third Saturday in August.

== See also ==
- Impact of the 2019–20 coronavirus pandemic on the meat industry in the United States
