= Paxico, Kansas =

City in Wabaunsee County, Kansas

- City
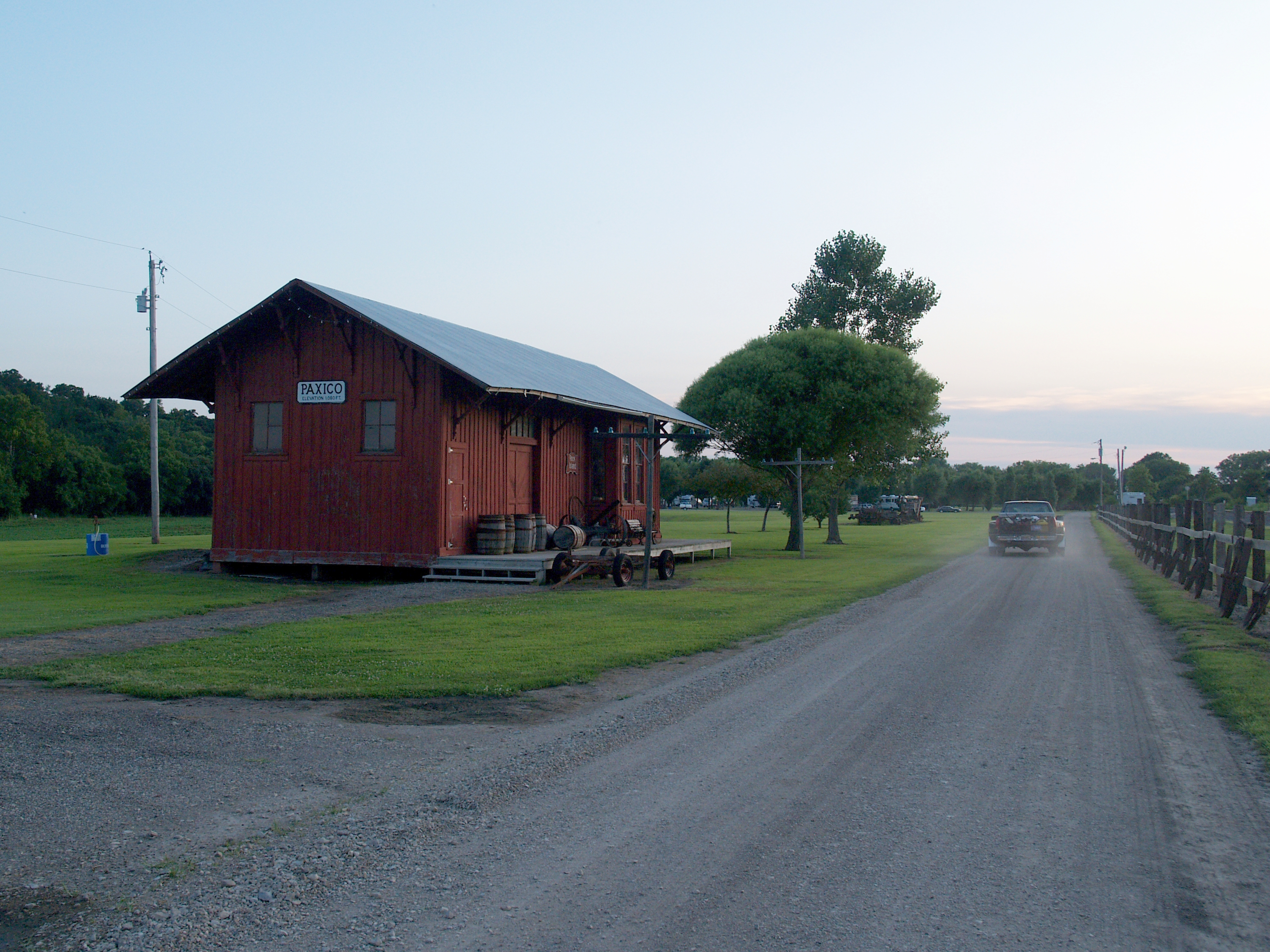
- Old railroad depot in Paxico (2009)

- Location within Wabaunsee County and Kansas

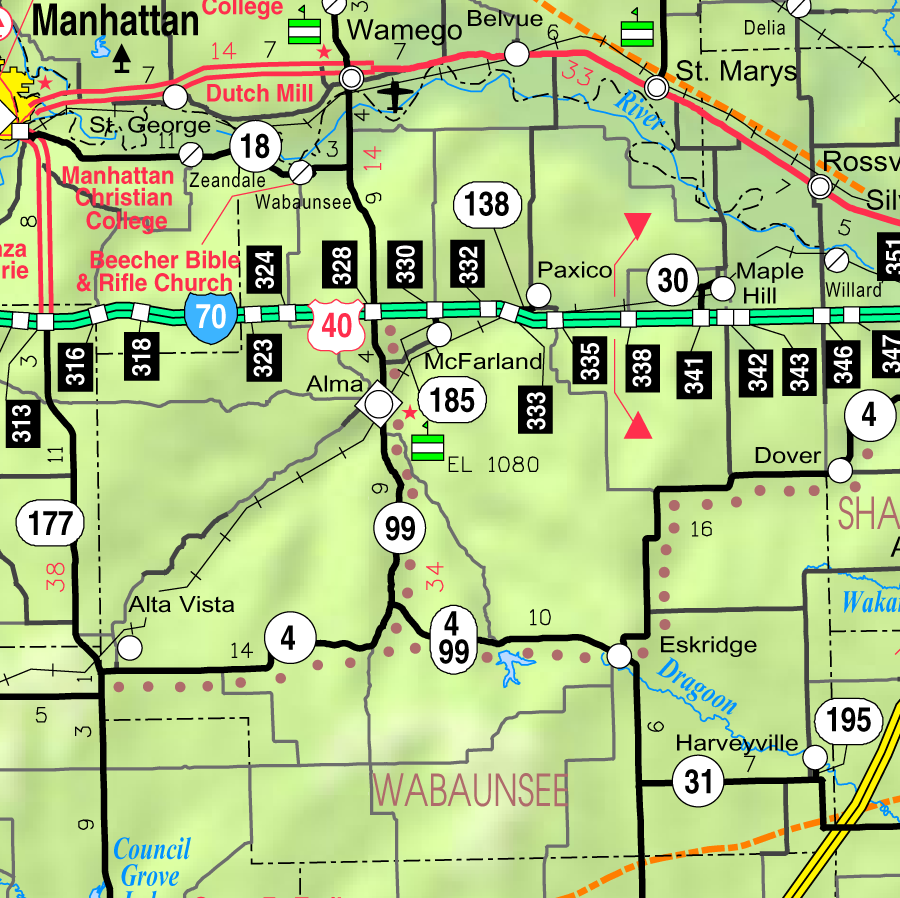
- KDOT map of Wabaunsee County (legend)
- Coordinates: 39°04′08″N 96°10′01″W
- Country: United States
- State: Kansas
- County: Wabaunsee
- Founded: 1879
- Incorporated: 1914
- Named for: Pashqua

Government
  - Type: Mayor–Council

Area
  - Total: 0.15 sq mi (0.38 km^{2})
  - Land: 0.15 sq mi (0.38 km^{2})
  - Water: 0 sq mi (0.00 km^{2})
- Elevation: 991 ft (302 m)

Population (2020)
  - Total: 210
  - Density: 1,400/sq mi (550/km^{2})
- Time zone: UTC-6 (CST)
  - Summer (DST): UTC-5 (CDT)
- ZIP Code: 66526
- Area code: 785
- FIPS code: 20-54950
- GNIS ID: 2396166
- Website: paxico-ks.org

Paxico is a city in Wabaunsee County, Kansas, United States. As of the 2020 census, its population was 210.

== History ==
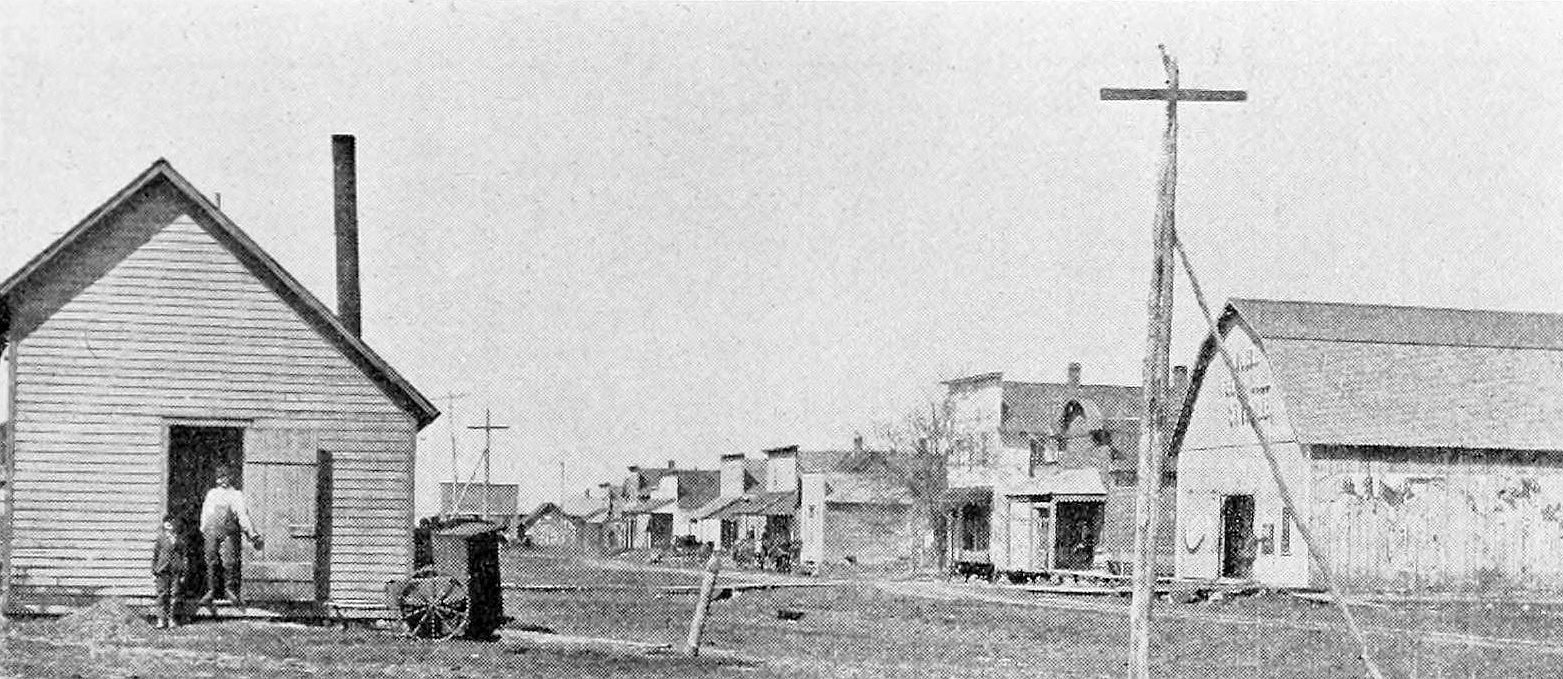
Main Street in Paxico, 1901

Paxico, originally called Strong Mill, was established in 1879 about one mile east of the present town site. A post office was set up and named Paxico, in honor of the Potawatomi medicine man Pashqua. When the railroad was built though the area in 1886, the town moved to be alongside it.

In 1887, the Chicago, Kansas and Nebraska Railway built a main line from Topeka through Paxico to Herington. The Chicago, Kansas and Nebraska Railway was foreclosed in 1891 and taken over by Chicago, Rock Island and Pacific Railway, which shut down in 1980 and reorganized as Oklahoma, Kansas and Texas Railroad, merged in 1988 with Missouri Pacific Railroad, and merged in 1997 with Union Pacific Railroad. Most locals still refer to this railroad as the "Rock Island".

== Geography ==
According to the United States Census Bureau, the city has a total area of 0.14 square miles (0.36 km^{2}), all land.

== Demographics ==
Historical population
Census	Pop.	Note	%±
1920	249		—
1930	261		4.8%
1940	237		−9.2%
1950	196		−17.3%
1960	276		40.8%
1970	216		−21.7%
1980	168		−22.2%
1990	174		3.6%
2000	211		21.3%
2010	221		4.7%
2020	210		−5.0%
U.S. Decennial Census

Paxico is part of the Topeka Metropolitan Statistical Area.

=== 2020 census ===
The 2020 United States census counted 210 people, 81 households, and 55 families in Paxico. The population density was 1,448.3 per square mile (559.2/km^{2}). The 89 housing units had an average density of 613.8/sq mi (237.0/km^{2}). The racial makeup was 86.67% White or European American, (84.76% non-Hispanic White), 0.48% Black or African American, 2.86% from other races, and 10.0% two or more races. Hispanics or Latinos of any race was 8.57% of the population.

Of the 81 households, 37.0% had children under 18, 50.6% were married couples living together, and 25.9% had a female householder with no spouse or partner present; 23.5% of households were individuals and 12.3% had someone living alone who was 65 or older. The average household size was 2.5 and the average family size was 3.3. The percentage of those with a bachelor's degree or higher was estimated to be 21.4% of the population.

The city's age distribution was 25.2% under 18, 11.9% from 18 to 24, 17.6% from 25 to 44, 27.1% from 45 to 64, and 18.1% who were 65 or older. The median age was 40.7 years. For every 100 females, there were 105.9 males. For every 100 females 18 and older, there were 109.3 males.

The 2016–2020 five-year American Community Survey estimated that the median household income was $35,000 (with a margin of error of +/- $11,935) and the median family income was $46,667 (+/- $30,062). Females had a median income of $20,278 (+/- $9,260). The median income for those above 16 years old was $25,469 (+/- $2,629). About 3.2% of families and 7.1% of the population were below the poverty line, including 12.3% of those under 18 and 3.5% of those 65 or over.

=== 2010 census ===
As of the 2010 census, 221 people, 85 households, and 58 families resided in the city. The population density was 1,578.6 inhabitants per square mile (609.5/km^{2}). The 93 housing units had an average density of 664.3 per square mile (256.5/km^{2}). The racial makeup of the city was 91.0% White, 1.8% African American, 0.5% Native American, and 6.8% from two or more races. Hispanics or Latinos of any race were 5.4% of the population.

Of the 85 households, 35.3% had children under 18 living with them, 54.1% were married couples living together, 5.9% had a female householder with no husband present, 8.2% had a male householder with no wife present, and 31.8% were not families. About 24.7% of all households were made up of individuals, and 7.1% had someone living alone who was 65 or older. The average household size was 2.60 and the average family size was 3.00.

The median age in the city was 36.3 years; 28.5% of residents were under 18, 6.3% were between 18 and 24, 26.3% were from 25 to 44, 25.7% were from 45 to 64, and 13.1% were 65 or older. The gender makeup of the city was 51.1% male and 48.9% female.

== Education ==
The community is served by Wabaunsee USD 329 public school district. USD 329 was formed by school unification that consolidated Alma, Maple Hill, McFarland, and Paxico. Wabaunsee High School is located in Alma. The Wabaunsee High School mascot is Wabaunsee Chargers.

Paxico High School was closed through school unification. The Paxico High School mascot was Paxico Pirates.

== Area events ==
- Paxico Meatloaf Festival and Car Show is held on the fourth Saturday in June.
- Paxico Blues Fest is held on the third Saturday in September.
