= Wabaunsee County, Kansas =

County in Kansas, United States

- County
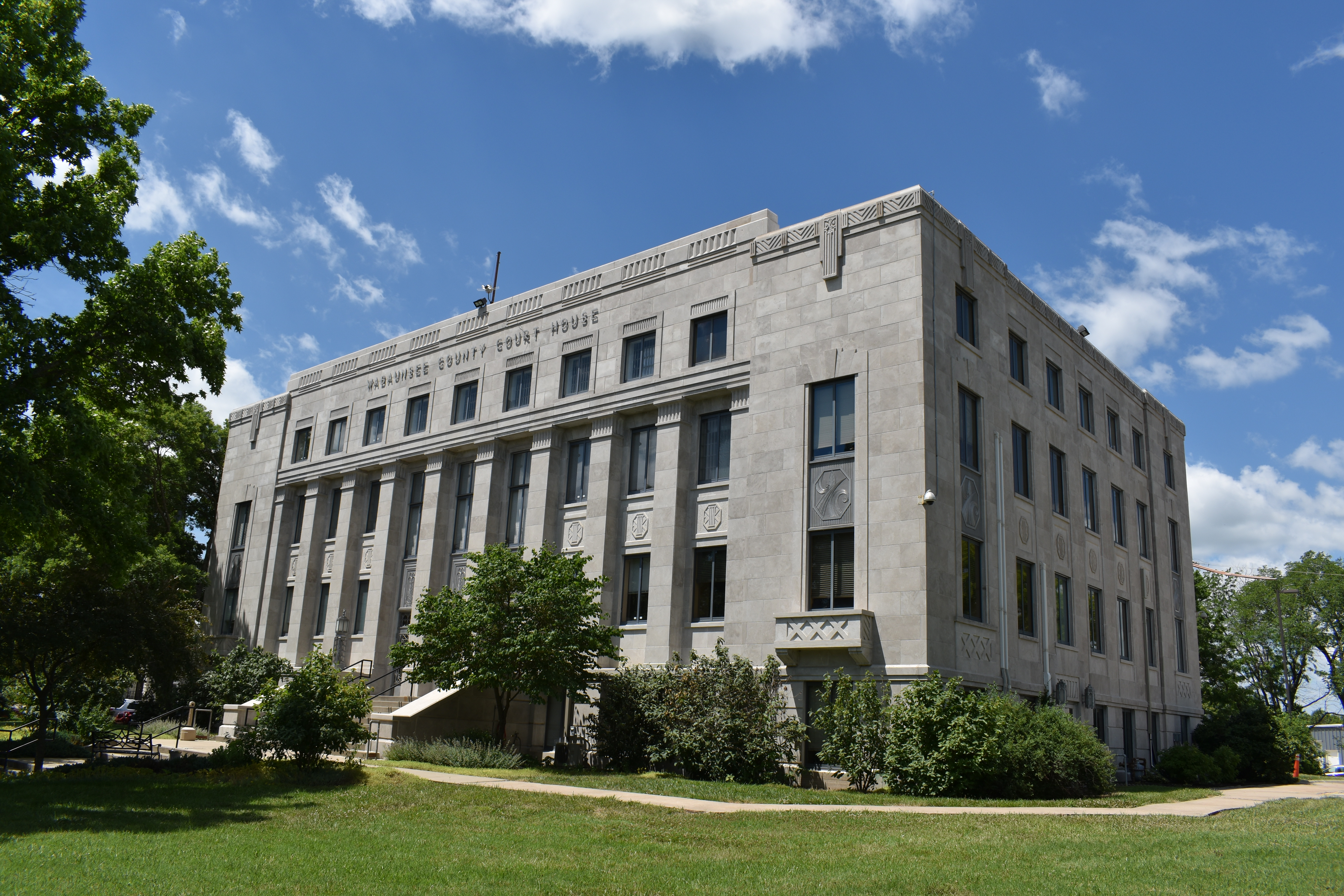
- Wabaunsee County Courthouse in Alma (2021)

- Location within the U.S. state of Kansas
- Coordinates: 39°01′07″N 96°17′33″W
- Country: United States
- State: Kansas
- Founded: 1859
- Named for: Chief Waubonsie
- Seat: Alma
- Largest city: Alma

Area
  - Total: 800 sq mi (2,100 km^{2})
  - Land: 794 sq mi (2,060 km^{2})
  - Water: 5.3 sq mi (14 km^{2}) 0.7%

Population (2020)
  - Total: 6,877
  - Estimate (2025): 7,018 ▲
  - Density: 8.7/sq mi (3.4/km^{2})
- Time zone: UTC−6 (Central)
  - Summer (DST): UTC−5 (CDT)
- Congressional district: 2nd
- Website: wbcounty.org

Wabaunsee County is a county located in the U.S. state of Kansas. Its county seat is Alma. As of the 2020 census, the county population was 6,877. The county was named for Chief Waubonsie of the Potawatomi Indians.

== History ==
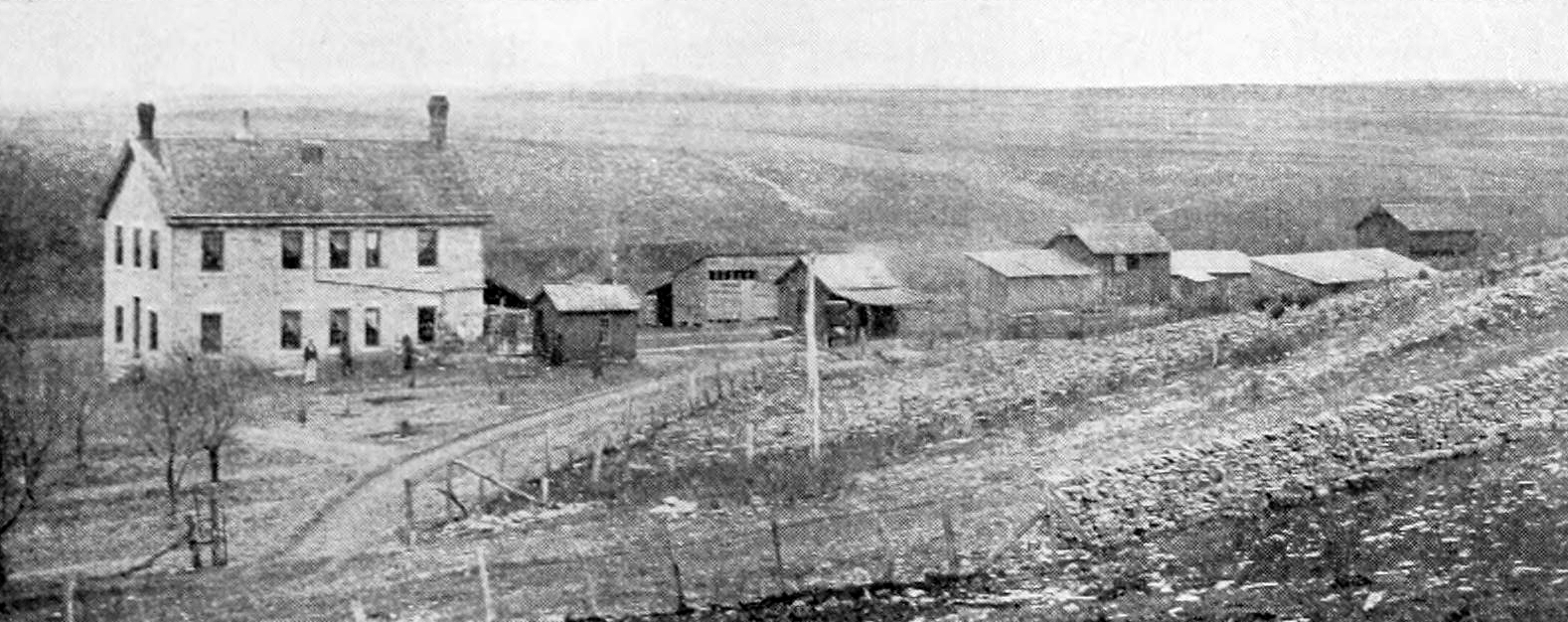
Wabaunsee County Poor Farm, located 4 mi (6.4 km) south of Alma, 1901

=== 19th century ===
For millennia, the land now known as Kansas was inhabited by Native Americans. In 1803, most of modern Kansas was secured by the United States as part of the Louisiana Purchase. The first white settlers in the area were said to have been a band of outlaws known as the McDaniel Gang.

In 1854, the Kansas Territory was organized and Wabaunsee County was created by the territorial legislature on March 25, 1859. The name used since 1859 is derived from the Potawatomi "Wah-bon-seh", meaning "dawn of day" literally, and it was the name of the chief of the Potawatomi Indians. Originally, the county was named Richardson, after William Alexander Richardson, a congressman from Illinois, who introduced the first Kansas and Nebraska Bill in the House of Representatives, which made certain Indian lands territories in 1854.

Also in 1854, the Beecher Bible and Rifle Church was established by a group of free-staters, who had rifles shipped to the church to be used in the free-state effort in boxes marked Bibles. Captain William Mitchell, Jr., a seaman who joined the Beecher Bible and Rifle Colony that settled in Wabaunsee, played an important role in the county settlement and with the underground railroad.

The county's first church, Wabaunsee Church of Christ, was founded in June 1857.

In 1861 Kansas became the 34th U.S. state, entering the union as a free state.

The first railroad to be built through Wabaunsee County was the Atchison, Topeka, and Santa Fe in 1880. In 1887, the Chicago, Kansas and Nebraska Railway built a main line from Topeka to Herington. This main line connected Topeka, Valencia, Willard, Maple Hill, Vera, Paxico, McFarland, Alma, Volland, Alta Vista, Dwight, White City, Latimer, Herington.

=== 20th century ===
A massive drought beginning in 1930 resulted in a series of dust storms that lasted until 1941. The drought combined with the onset of the Great Depression, forced farmers off the land. This ecological disaster caused an exodus of many farmers to escape from the hostile environment of Kansas. As the world demand for wheat plummeted, rural Kansas became poverty-stricken. The state became an eager participant in such major New Deal relief programs as the Civil Works Administration, the Federal Emergency Relief Administration, the Civilian Conservation Corps, the Works Progress Administration, which put tens of thousands of Kansans to work as unskilled labor. Republican Governor Alf Landon also employed emergency measures, including a moratorium on mortgage foreclosures and a balanced budget initiative. The Agricultural Adjustment Administration succeeded in raising wheat prices after 1933, thus alleviating the most serious distress.

During World War II, the U.S. Army located a German prisoner of war camp at Lake Wabaunsee, near Eskridge. It was believed that the prisoners would be less of a security risk in North America, where there were fewer Nazi sympathizers, than they would be in Europe. The prisoners were paid $0.40 per hour and granted a daily noon lunch, in exchange for their help on farms and bridges throughout the region.

== Geography ==
According to the U.S. Census Bureau, the county has a total area of 800 square miles (2,100 km^{2}), of which 794 square miles (2,060 km^{2}) is land and 5.3 square miles (14 km^{2}) (0.7%) is water.

=== Adjacent counties ===
- Pottawatomie County (north)
- Shawnee County (east)
- Osage County (southeast)
- Lyon County (south)
- Morris County (southwest)
- Geary County (west)
- Riley County (northwest)

== Demographics ==
Historical population
Census	Pop.	Note	%±
1860	1,023		—
1870	3,362		228.6%
1880	8,756		160.4%
1890	11,720		33.9%
1900	12,813		9.3%
1910	12,721		−0.7%
1920	11,424		−10.2%
1930	10,830		−5.2%
1940	9,219		−14.9%
1950	7,212		−21.8%
1960	6,648		−7.8%
1970	6,397		−3.8%
1980	6,867		7.3%
1990	6,603		−3.8%
2000	6,885		4.3%
2010	7,053		2.4%
2020	6,877		−2.5%
2025 (est.)	7,018	▲	2.1%
U.S. Decennial Census; 1790-1960 1900-1990; 1990-2000 2010-2020

Wabaunsee County is part of the Topeka metropolitan area.

=== Racial and ethnic composition ===
Wabaunsee County, Kansas – Racial and ethnic composition Note: the U.S. Census treats Hispanic/Latino as an ethnic category. This table excludes Latinos from the racial categories and assigns them to a separate category. Hispanics/Latinos may be of any race.
Race / Ethnicity (NH = Non-Hispanic)	Pop 1980	Pop 1990	Pop 2000	Pop 2010	Pop 2020	% 1980	% 1990	% 2000	% 2010	% 2020
White alone (NH)	6,714	6,415	6,628	6,664	6,185	97.77%	97.15%	96.27%	94.48%	89.94%
Black or African American alone (NH)	51	41	26	28	31	0.74%	0.62%	0.38%	0.40%	0.45%
Native American or Alaska Native alone (NH)	11	24	32	33	29	0.16%	0.36%	0.46%	0.47%	0.42%
Asian alone (NH)	6	7	10	10	12	0.09%	0.11%	0.15%	0.14%	0.17%
Native Hawaiian or Pacific Islander alone (NH)	x	x	1	0	4	x	x	0.01%	0.00%	0.06%
Other race alone (NH)	25	0	4	2	21	0.36%	0.00%	0.06%	0.03%	0.31%
Mixed race or Multiracial (NH)	x	x	56	111	278	x	x	0.81%	1.57%	4.04%
Hispanic or Latino (any race)	60	116	128	205	317	0.87%	1.76%	1.86%	2.91%	4.61%
Total	6,867	6,603	6,885	7,053	6,877	100.00%	100.00%	100.00%	100.00%	100.00%

=== 2020 census ===
As of the 2020 census, the county had a population of 6,877. The median age was 43.7 years. 24.4% of residents were under the age of 18 and 20.8% of residents were 65 years of age or older. For every 100 females there were 105.4 males, and for every 100 females age 18 and over there were 102.0 males age 18 and over.

The racial makeup of the county was 91.7% White, 0.5% Black or African American, 0.6% American Indian and Alaska Native, 0.3% Asian, 0.1% Native Hawaiian and Pacific Islander, 0.8% from some other race, and 6.2% from two or more races. Hispanic or Latino residents of any race comprised 4.6% of the population.

0.0% of residents lived in urban areas, while 100.0% lived in rural areas.

There were 2,659 households in the county, of which 28.6% had children under the age of 18 living with them and 18.4% had a female householder with no spouse or partner present. About 24.9% of all households were made up of individuals and 13.1% had someone living alone who was 65 years of age or older.

There were 3,110 housing units, of which 14.5% were vacant. Among occupied housing units, 84.3% were owner-occupied and 15.7% were renter-occupied. The homeowner vacancy rate was 1.8% and the rental vacancy rate was 10.3%.

=== 2000 census ===
As of the census of 2000, there were 6,885 people, 2,633 households, and 1,958 families residing in the county. The population density was 9 people per square mile (3.5 people/km^{2}). There were 3,033 housing units at an average density of 4 per square mile (1.5/km^{2}). The racial makeup of the county was 97.24% White, 0.46% Black or African American, 0.49% Native American, 0.15% Asian, 0.06% Pacific Islander, 0.60% from other races, and 1.00% from two or more races. 1.86% of the population were Hispanic or Latino of any race.

There were 2,633 households, out of which 33.50% had children under the age of 18 living with them, 64.30% were married couples living together, 6.30% had a female householder with no husband present, and 25.60% were non-families. 23.00% of all households were made up of individuals, and 10.80% had someone living alone who was 65 years of age or older. The average household size was 2.57 and the average family size was 3.01.

In the county, the population was spread out, with 26.70% under the age of 18, 6.20% from 18 to 24, 26.70% from 25 to 44, 24.80% from 45 to 64, and 15.60% who were 65 years of age or older. The median age was 40 years. For every 100 females, there were 102.50 males. For every 100 females age 18 and over, there were 101.30 males.

The median income for a household in the county was $41,710, and the median income for a family was $47,500. Males had a median income of $31,629 versus $23,148 for females. The per capita income for the county was $17,704. About 5.80% of families and 7.30% of the population were below the poverty line, including 8.40% of those under age 18 and 7.90% of those age 65 or over.

== Government ==
County governance is overseen by a three member Board of Commissioners, each of whom is responsible for a separate district.

=== Presidential elections ===
Presidential election results

United States presidential election results for Wabaunsee County, Kansas
Year	Republican		Democratic		Third party(ies)	
Year	No.	%	No.	%	No.	%
1888	1,708	62.52%	960	35.14%	64	2.34%
1892	1,356	46.82%	0	0.00%	1,540	53.18%
1896	1,586	51.80%	1,442	47.09%	34	1.11%
1900	1,793	58.06%	1,263	40.90%	32	1.04%
1904	2,016	71.44%	688	24.38%	118	4.18%
1908	1,849	60.25%	1,163	37.90%	57	1.86%
1912	783	26.82%	1,128	38.63%	1,009	34.55%
1916	2,640	58.95%	1,706	38.10%	132	2.95%
1920	2,859	77.63%	782	21.23%	42	1.14%
1924	2,742	65.90%	633	15.21%	786	18.89%
1928	3,099	71.89%	1,189	27.58%	23	0.53%
1932	2,304	47.39%	2,465	50.70%	93	1.91%
1936	2,809	55.52%	2,235	44.18%	15	0.30%
1940	3,481	73.64%	1,212	25.64%	34	0.72%
1944	2,839	75.95%	873	23.35%	26	0.70%
1948	2,437	66.80%	1,162	31.85%	49	1.34%
1952	3,182	81.03%	736	18.74%	9	0.23%
1956	2,650	76.63%	802	23.19%	6	0.17%
1960	2,351	70.58%	969	29.09%	11	0.33%
1964	1,839	58.34%	1,287	40.83%	26	0.82%
1968	1,979	64.17%	695	22.54%	410	13.29%
1972	2,461	76.83%	662	20.67%	80	2.50%
1976	1,921	57.58%	1,354	40.59%	61	1.83%
1980	2,255	67.98%	853	25.72%	209	6.30%
1984	2,276	72.72%	805	25.72%	49	1.57%
1988	1,737	58.54%	1,166	39.30%	64	2.16%
1992	1,254	37.17%	851	25.22%	1,269	37.61%
1996	1,884	55.67%	966	28.55%	534	15.78%
2000	2,182	63.80%	1,025	29.97%	213	6.23%
2004	2,531	70.23%	1,001	27.77%	72	2.00%
2008	2,395	68.02%	1,036	29.42%	90	2.56%
2012	2,256	69.05%	918	28.10%	93	2.85%
2016	2,372	70.18%	776	22.96%	232	6.86%
2020	2,845	72.91%	964	24.71%	93	2.38%
2024	2,816	73.41%	944	24.61%	76	1.98%

Wabaunsee County is overwhelmingly Republican. No Democratic presidential candidate has won Wabaunsee County since Franklin D. Roosevelt in 1932, and since at least 1888 only Roosevelt in 1932 and 1936, plus William Jennings Bryan in 1896, have reached 41 percent of the county's vote for the Democratic Party. The county was, however, one of three Kansas counties – Anderson and Jefferson being the other two – to give a plurality to Ross Perot in 1992.

=== Laws ===
Wabaunsee County was a prohibition, or "dry", county until the Kansas Constitution was amended in 1986 and voters approved the sale of alcoholic liquor by the individual drink with a 30 percent food sales requirement.

== Education ==
=== Unified school districts ===
School districts based in the county include:

- Wabaunsee USD 329 (Mill Creek Valley USD 329)
- Mission Valley USD 330 (Wabaunsee East USD 330)

Other districts include:

- Kaw Valley USD 321
- Manhattan USD 383
- Morris County USD 417
- North Lyon County USD 251
- Wamego USD 320

== Communities ==
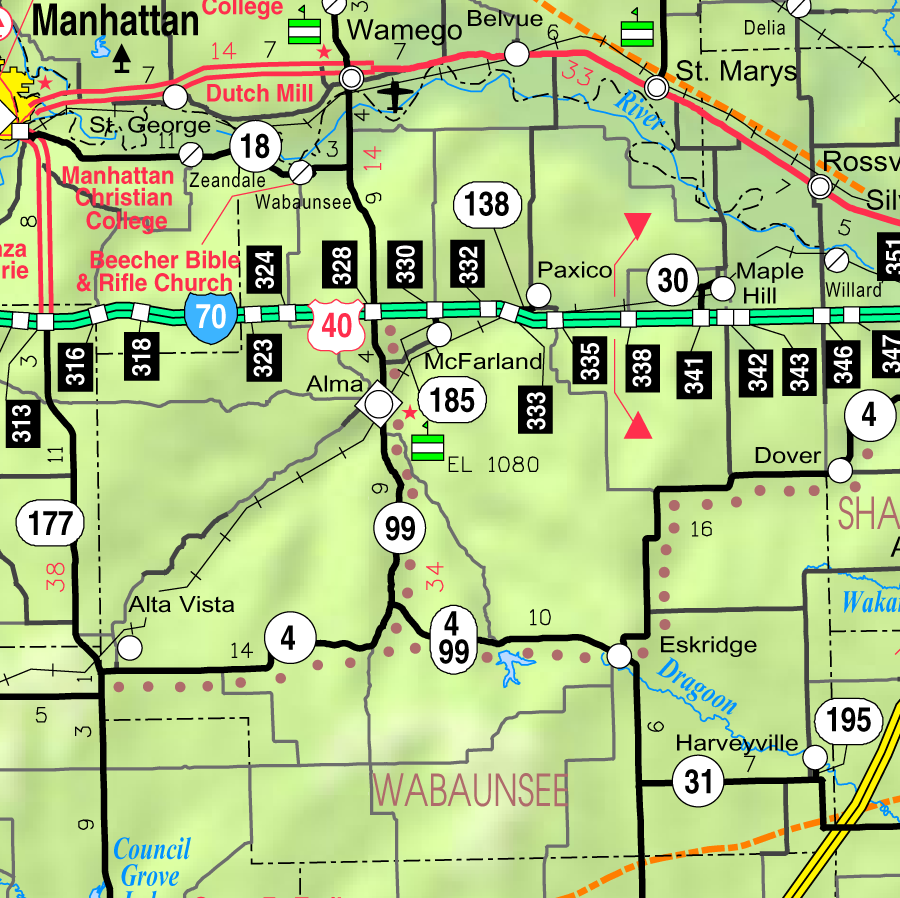
2005 map of Wabaunsee County from KDOT (map legend)

List of townships / incorporated cities / unincorporated communities / extinct former communities within Wabaunsee County.

=== Cities ===
‡ denotes a community with portions in an adjacent county.

- Alma (county seat)
- Alta Vista
- Eskridge
- Harveyville
- Maple Hill
- McFarland
- Paxico
- St. Marys‡
- Willard‡

=== Unincorporated communities ===
† denotes a community which is designated a Census-Designated Place (CDP) by the United States Census Bureau.

- Keene
- Newbury†
- Volland
- Wabaunsee†
- Wilmington

=== Ghost towns ===
- Bradford
- Vera

=== Townships ===
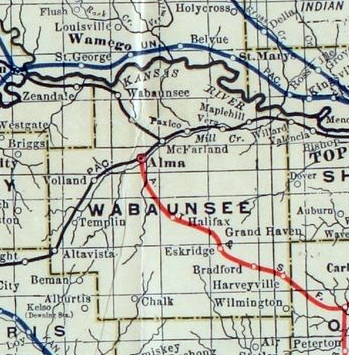
1915 railroad map of Wabaunsee County

Wabaunsee County is divided into thirteen townships. None of the cities within the county are considered governmentally independent, and all figures for the townships include those of the cities. In the following table, the population center is the largest city (or cities) included in that township's population total, if it is of a significant size.

Sources: 2000 U.S. Gazetteer from the U.S. Census Bureau.
Township	FIPS	Population center	Population	Population density /km^{2} (/sq mi)	Land area km^{2} (sq mi)	Water area km^{2} (sq mi)	Water %	Geographic coordinates
Alma	01375	Alma	1,137	11 (28)	104 (40)	0 (0)	0%	39°1′8″N 96°17′33″W
Farmer	23125		119	1 (2)	172 (66)	0 (0)	0.07%	38°55′37″N 96°18′44″W
Garfield	25850	Alta Visa	590	5 (13)	118 (45)	0 (0)	0.09%	38°51′44″N 96°27′20″W
Kaw	36150		242	2 (6)	110 (42)	2 (1)	1.55%	39°10′16″N 96°9′46″W
Maple Hill	44525	Maple Hill	930	5 (13)	190 (73)	1 (0)	0.55%	39°4′43″N 96°0′52″W
Mill Creek	46725	Lake Wabaunsee	293	2 (4)	192 (74)	1 (0)	0.43%	38°53′23″N 96°11′23″W
Mission Creek	47300		495	2 (6)	209 (81)	0 (0)	0.04%	38°55′49″N 96°3′0″W
Newbury	50275	Paxico / McFarland	1,045	5 (13)	203 (78)	0 (0)	0.06%	39°3′44″N 96°11′18″W
Plumb	56800	Harveyville	640	5 (13)	129 (50)	0 (0)	0.17%	38°47′56″N 95°58′36″W
Rock Creek	60650		84	0 (1)	171 (66)	0 (0)	0.05%	38°46′58″N 96°18′15″W
Wabaunsee	74250	Wabaunsee	455	3 (7)	172 (66)	2 (1)	1.05%	39°6′57″N 96°18′21″W
Washington	75800		83	1 (1)	148 (57)	0 (0)	0.02%	38°57′49″N 96°25′14″W
Wilmington	79525	Eskridge	772	5 (13)	150 (58)	0 (0)	0.03%	38°49′54″N 96°6′14″W

== See also ==
- National Register of Historic Places listings in Wabaunsee County, Kansas
