= Parkerville =

Parkerville can refer to:

- Parkerville, Kansas, United States
- Parkerville, Western Australia, a suburb of Perth
