= Elmo, Kansas =

Unincorporated community in Dickinson County, Kansas

- Unincorporated community
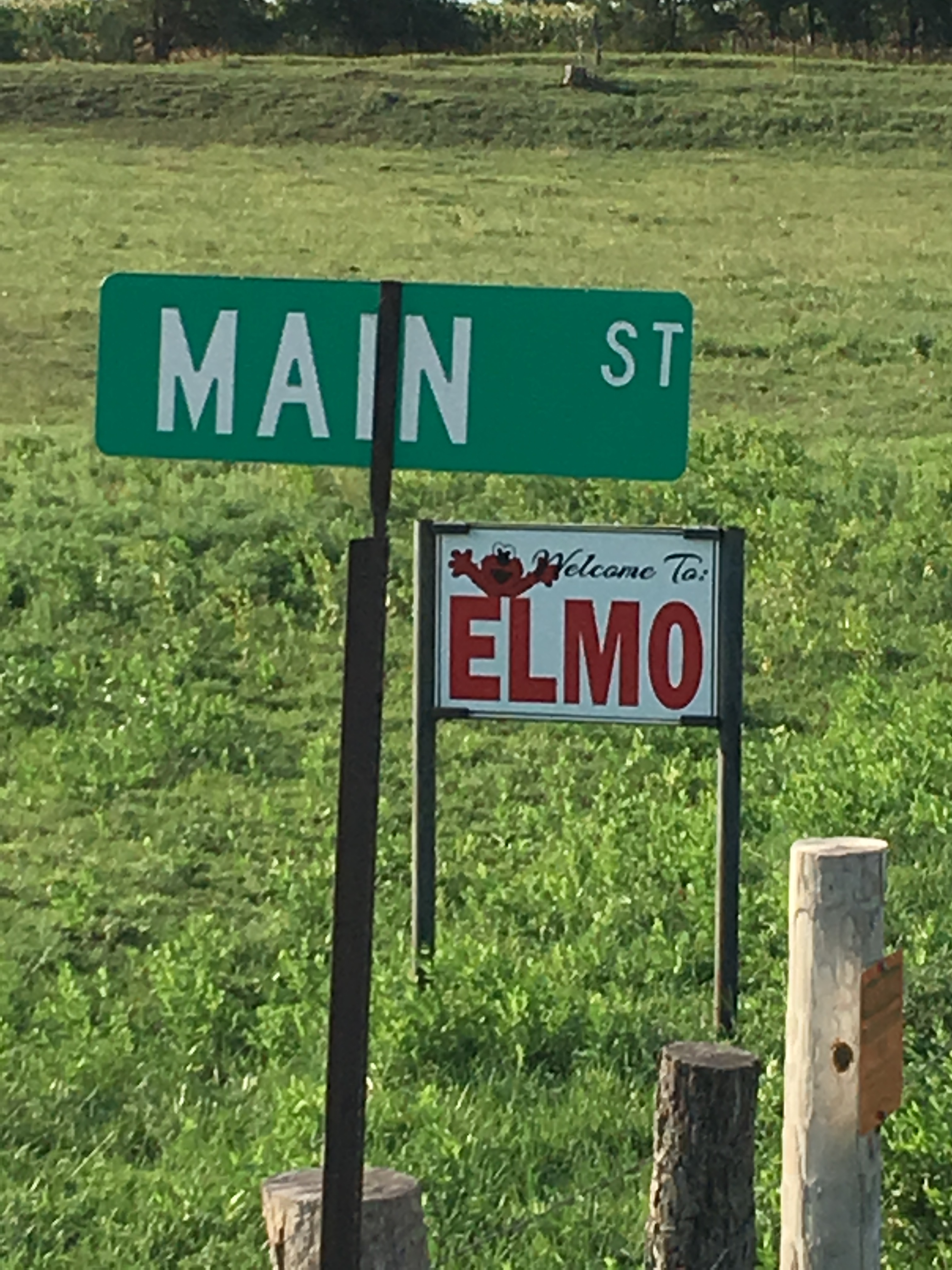
- Elmo on the community's welcome sign (2016)

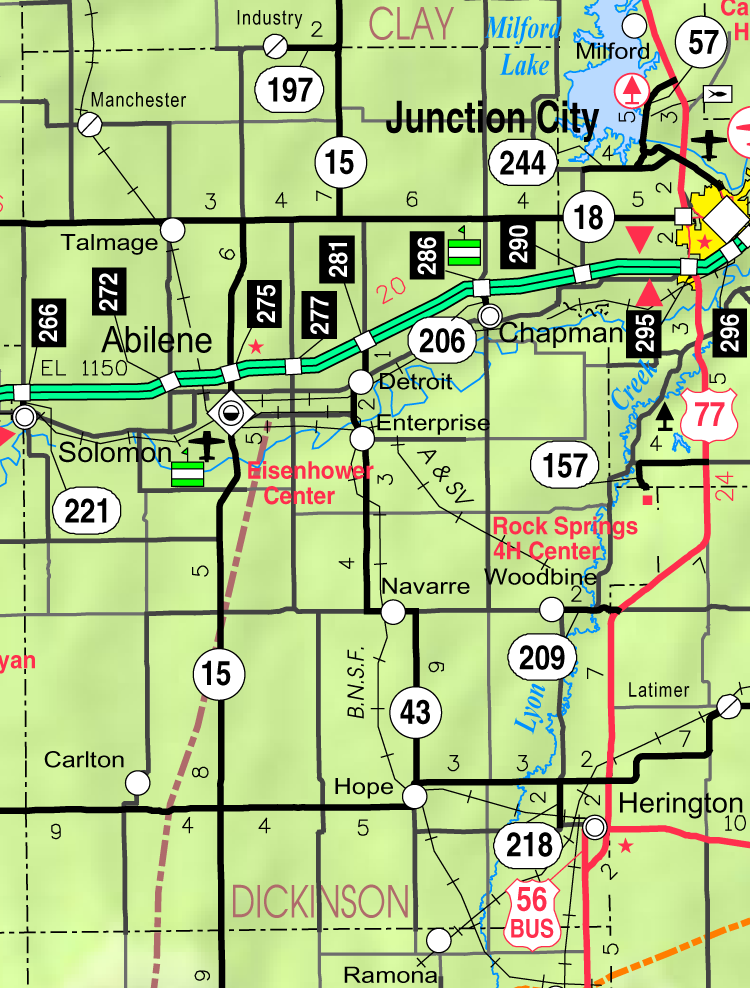
- KDOT map of Dickinson County (legend)
- Coordinates: 38°41′3″N 97°13′48″W
- Country: United States
- State: Kansas
- County: Dickinson
- Elevation: 1,355 ft (413 m)
- Time zone: UTC-6 (CST)
  - Summer (DST): UTC-5 (CDT)
- Area code: 785
- FIPS code: 20-20825
- GNIS ID: 476978

Elmo is an unincorporated community in Dickinson County, Kansas, United States. Elmo is located 15 miles (24 km) south of Abilene at the northwestern corner of the intersection of K-4 and K-15.

== History ==
=== Early history ===
For many millennia, the Great Plains of North America was inhabited by nomadic Native Americans. From the 16th century to 18th century, the Kingdom of France claimed ownership of large parts of North America. In 1762, after the French and Indian War, France secretly ceded New France to Spain, per the Treaty of Fontainebleau.

=== 19th century ===
In 1802, Spain returned most of the land to France. In 1803, most of the land for modern day Kansas was acquired by the United States from France as part of the 828,000 square mile Louisiana Purchase for 2.83 cents per acre.

In 1854, the Kansas Territory was organized, then in 1861 Kansas became the 34th U.S. state. In 1857, Dickinson County was established within the Kansas Territory, which included the land for modern day Elmo.

Elmo started about one mile from its current location, but the source of the name is unknown. When the Missouri Pacific Railroad was built through the area, the railroad didn't like the Elmo location because it was sloping ground, so it built a station at nearby Banner City (current location of Elmo). The old Elmo post office was moved to Banner City around 1887. The name Banner City already existed in Jackson and Trego counties, so eventually the Elmo name replaced it. The post office was opened in Elmo on December 16, 1884, and remained in operation until it was discontinued on May 6, 1966. The railroad was removed in the 1990s.

=== 20th century ===
In 1899, Elias Sellards discovered a well-preserved trove of insect fossils about 3 miles south of Elmo in the Lower-Permian Elmo-Limestone member of the Wellington Formation. In 1925, Frank M. Carpenter begins studying the fossil bed. In 1928, Robert John Tillyard researched the same fossil bed. The Elmo site has produced tens of thousands of specimens, with more than 150 species of insects described, including large fossils of Meganeuropsis. The site is located on private land and closed to the public.

=== 21st century ===
In 2014, a group of locals adopted the Sesame Street character Elmo as its mascot to be placed on a new sign.

== Geography ==
Elmo is located at the northwestern corner of the intersection of K-4 and K-15 (also known as 600 Ave in Dickinson County), which is 15 miles (24 km) south of Abilene or 14 miles (23 km) west of Herington.

== Education ==
The community is served by Chapman USD 473 public school district.

== Gallery ==
- Historic Images of Elmo, Special Photo Collections at Wichita State University Library
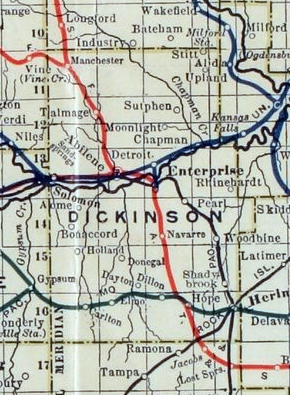
1915 railroad map of Dickinson County

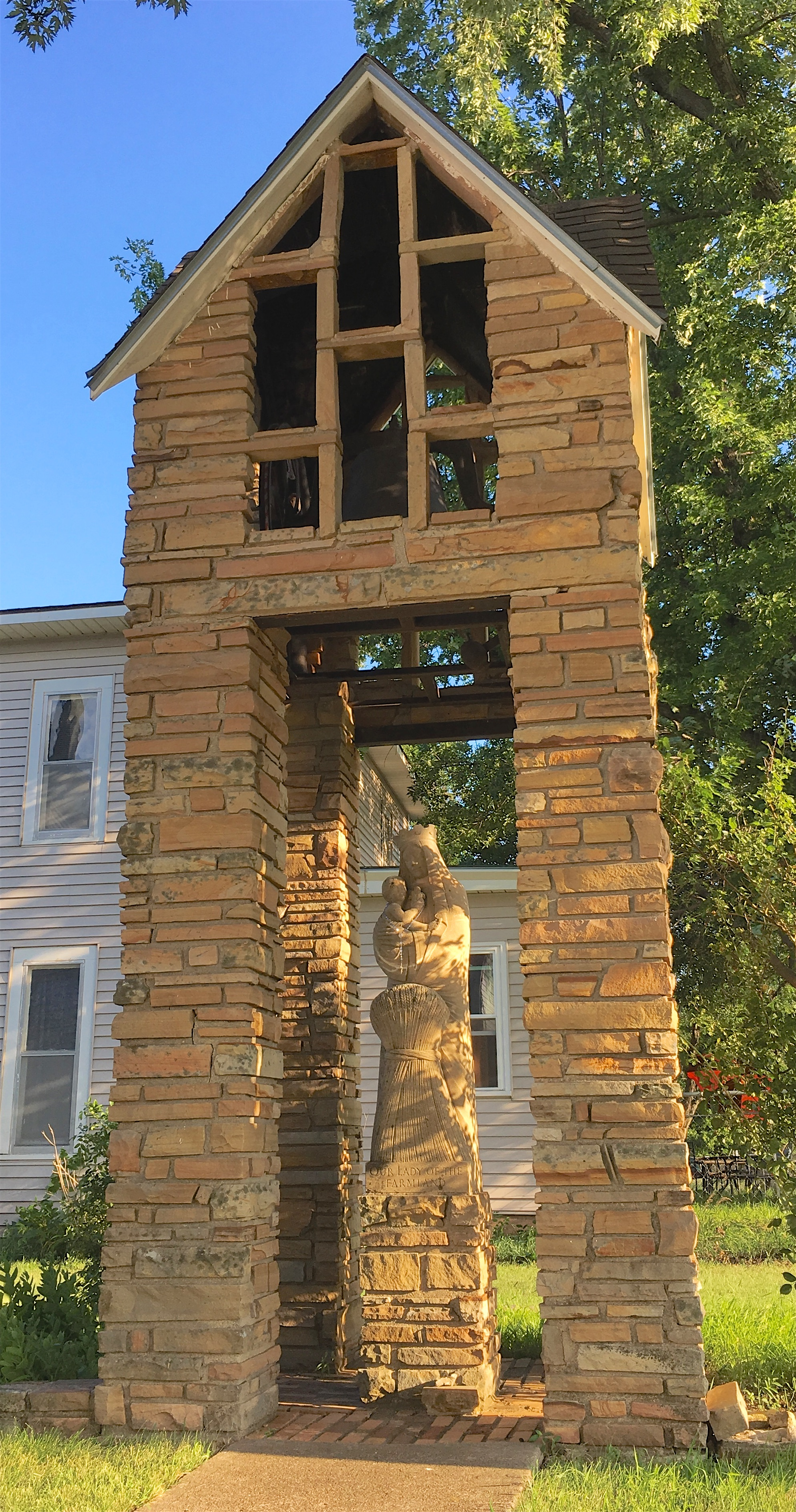
Stone structure housing a statue and bell at the church (2016)

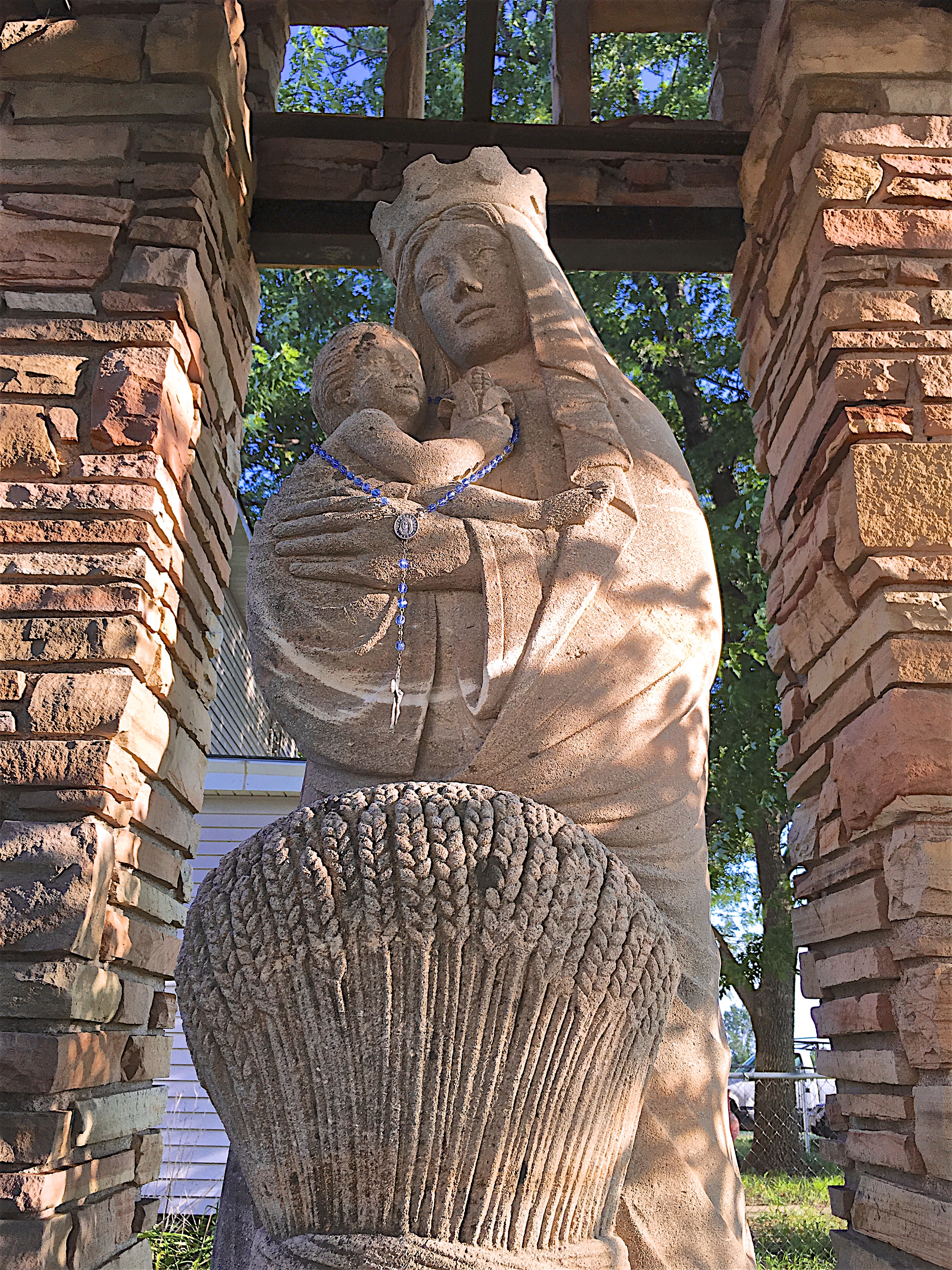
"Our Lady of the Farmland" statue (2016)

== See also ==
- Banner Township, Dickinson County, Kansas (location of Elmo)
- Mid-June 1992 tornado outbreak
