= Pearl, Kansas =

Unincorporated community in Dickinson County, Kansas

Coordinates: 38°51′06″N 97°02′39″W

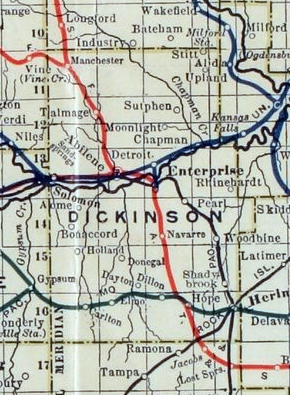
1915 railroad map of Dickinson County

Pearl is an unincorporated community in Dickinson County, Kansas, United States.

== History ==
Pearl had a post office from 1883 until 1935.

The Rock Island served the area for many years until the company was granted bankruptcy in 1980. The track was then used by the Missouri-Kansas-Texas (the Katy) railroad, which operated the line as the Oklahoma-Kansas-and Texas (OKT) until the Katy's assets were absorbed by the Union Pacific Railroad in 1988. While part of the line was scrapped, the remaining track from Abilene to Woodbine was purchased by the Abilene and Smoky Valley Railroad in 1993.

All that remains in Pearl today are the railroad tracks, the CO-OP grain elevator, and the ruins of a solitary stone house.

== Education ==
The community is served by Chapman USD 473 public school district.

== Transportation ==
The Chicago, Rock Island and Pacific Railroad formerly provided mixed train service to Pearl on a line between Herington and Salina until at least 1956. As of 2025, the nearest passenger rail station is located in Newton, where Amtrak's Southwest Chief stops once daily on a route from Chicago to Los Angeles.

== Notable people ==
- Sam R. Heller, former president of Eisenhower Foundation which helped build the Eisenhower Library & Museum in Abilene.
