= Sam R. Heller =

American politician (1892–1969)

Member of the Kansas Senate
- In office January 10, 1962 – 1964
- Preceded by: Gordon Mark

Personal details
- Born: Sam Raymond Heller; 1892 Pearl, Kansas, U.S.
- Died: October 1, 1969 (aged 76–77) Port Clinton, Ohio, U.S.
- Resting place: Port Clinton, Ohio, U.S.
- Children: 1
- Education: Washburn University Law School; Harvard Business School
- Occupation: Politician; banker

Military service
- Allegiance: United States
- Branch/service: United States Navy
- Rank: Ensign
- Battles/wars: World War I

Sam Raymond Heller (1892 - October 1, 1969) was an American politician and banker. He served one term in the Kansas Senate from 1962 to 1964.

== Early life ==
Sam Raymond Heller was born in Pearl, Kansas, a community southeast of Abilene. He attended high school in Chapman. Heller graduated from the Washburn University Law School and Harvard Business School.

== Career ==
Heller served as an ensign in the U.S. Navy in World War I.

Heller was active in the Eisenhower Foundation which helped build the Eisenhower Museum (now part of the Eisenhower Presidential Center), and served as its president from 1951 to 1969. Heller was elected president in June 1951. Heller was also a friend of Dwight D. Eisenhower and helped make arrangements for Eisenhower's visits to Abilene.

Heller served as a member of the Kansas Senate for one term from 1962 to 1964, representing Dickinson and Clay counties. He replaced Gordon Mark, who resigned from office, on January 10, 1962. In 1927 he became an officer of the United Trust Company of Abilene. He became president of the United Trust Company. He was also the director of a chain of Duckwall's stores and served as treasurer for several years. Heller was the director of Alliance Insurance Company in McPherson.

== Personal life and death ==
Heller was married and had one daughter, Barbara Heller, a professor at the University of California, Davis.

Heller died of a heart attack on October 1, 1969, at his family's summer home in Port Clinton, Ohio. He was buried in Port Clinton.
