= Dickinson County, Kansas =

County in Kansas, United States

- County
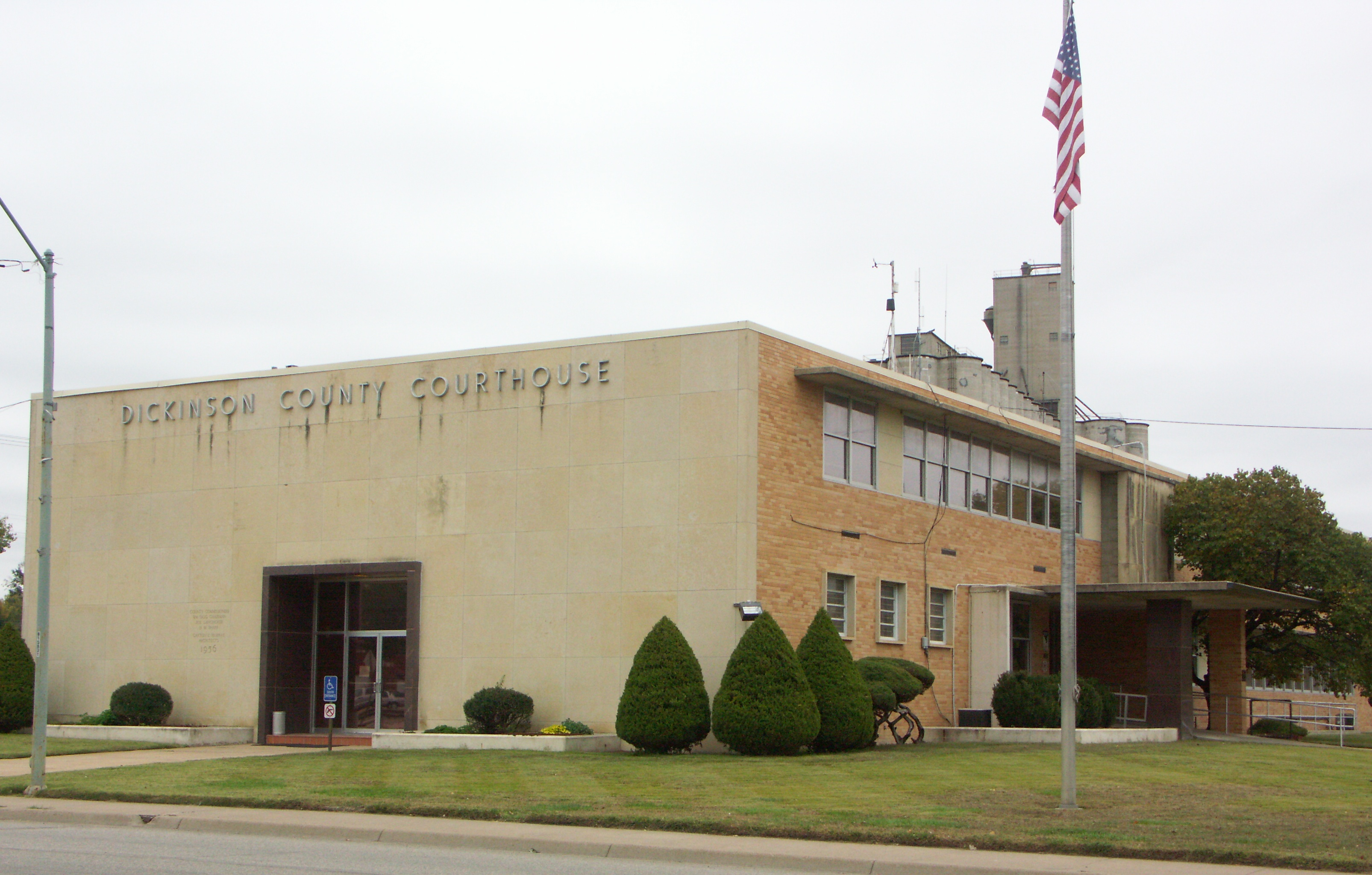
- Dickinson County Courthouse in Abilene (2009)

- Location within the U.S. state of Kansas
- Country: United States
- State: Kansas
- Founded: February 20, 1857
- Named for: Daniel S. Dickinson
- Seat: Abilene
- Largest city: Abilene

Area
  - Total: 852 sq mi (2,210 km^{2})
  - Land: 847 sq mi (2,190 km^{2})
  - Water: 4.9 sq mi (13 km^{2}) 0.6%

Population (2020)
  - Total: 18,402
  - Estimate (2025): 18,637 ▲
  - Density: 21.7/sq mi (8.4/km^{2})
- Time zone: UTC−6 (Central)
  - Summer (DST): UTC−5 (CDT)
- Area code: 785
- Congressional district: 1st
- Website: www.dkcoks.gov

Dickinson County is a county in Central Kansas. Its county seat and most populous city is Abilene. As of the 2020 census, the county population was 18,402. The county was named in honor of Daniel Dickinson, a U.S. Senator from New York that was a Kansas statehood advocate.

== History ==
=== Early history ===
For many millennia, the Great Plains of North America was inhabited by nomadic Native Americans. From the 16th century to 18th century, the Kingdom of France claimed ownership of large parts of North America. In 1762, after the French and Indian War, France secretly ceded New France to Spain, per the Treaty of Fontainebleau. In 1802, Spain returned most of the land to France, but keeping title to about 7,500 square miles.

In 1803, most of the land for modern day Kansas was acquired by the United States from France as part of the 828,000 square mile Louisiana Purchase for 2.83 cents per acre. In 1848, after the Mexican–American War, the Treaty of Guadalupe Hidalgo with Spain brought into the United States all or part of land for ten future states, including southwest Kansas. In 1854, the Kansas Territory was organized, then in 1861 Kansas became the 34th U.S. state.

=== 19th century ===
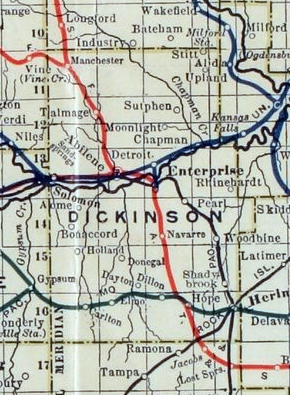
1915-1918 railroad map of Dickinson County

In 1857, Dickinson County was founded.

The first railroad in Dickinson County was built through that territory in 1866.

In 1887, Mr. Herington got the Chicago, Kansas and Nebraska Railway to build through Herington. He gave the land and right-of-way for Herington to become a division point with shops, two round houses, freight house, bridge yards, telegraph office and many other buildings. He furnished the limestone for the freight house, and for a two-story depot that was 28 by 66 feet (8.5 m × 20.1 m) and later enlarged to 28 by 105 feet (8.5 m × 32.0 m).

In 1887, the Chicago, Kansas and Nebraska Railway built a main line from Topeka to Herington. This main line connected Topeka, Valencia, Willard, Maple Hill, Vera, Paxico, McFarland, Alma, Volland, Alta Vista, Dwight, White City, Latimer, Herington.

In 1887, the Chicago, Kansas and Nebraska Railway extended its main line from Herington to Pratt. This main line connected Herington, Ramona, Tampa, Durham, Waldeck, Canton, Galva, McPherson, Groveland, Inman, Medora, Hutchinson, Whiteside, Partridge, Arlington, Langdon, Turon, Preston, Natrona, Pratt. In 1888, this main line was extended to Liberal. Later, this line was extended to Tucumcari, New Mexico and El Paso, Texas. This line is called the "Golden State Limited".

In 1887, the Chicago, Kansas and Nebraska Railway built a branch line north–south from Herington to Caldwell. This branch line connected Herington, Lost Springs, Lincolnville, Antelope, Marion, Aulne, Peabody, Elbing, Whitewater, Furley, Kechi, Wichita, Peck, Corbin, Wellington, Caldwell. By 1893, this branch line was incrementally built to Fort Worth, Texas. This line is called the "OKT".

The Chicago, Kansas and Nebraska Railway was foreclosed in 1891 and was taken over by Chicago, Rock Island and Pacific Railway, which shut down in 1980 and reorganized as Oklahoma, Kansas and Texas Railroad, merged in 1988 with Missouri Pacific Railroad, merged in 1997 with Union Pacific Railroad. Most locals still refer to this railroad as the "Rock Island".

In 1887, Atchison, Topeka and Santa Fe Railway built a branch line from Neva (3 miles west of Strong City) to Superior, Nebraska. This branch line connected Strong City, Neva, Rockland, Diamond Springs, Burdick, Lost Springs, Jacobs, Hope, Navarre, Enterprise, Abilene, Talmage, Manchester, Longford, Oak Hill, Miltonvale, Aurora, Huscher, Concordia, Kackley, Courtland, Webber, Superior. At some point, the line from Neva to Lost Springs was pulled but the right of way has not been abandoned. This branch line was originally called "Strong City and Superior line" but later the name was shortened to the "Strong City line".

In 1996, the Atchison, Topeka and Santa Fe Railway merged with Burlington Northern Railroad and renamed to the current BNSF Railway. Most locals still refer to this railroad as the "Santa Fe".

=== 21st century ===
In 2010, the Keystone-Cushing Pipeline (Phase II) was constructed north to south through Dickinson County, with much controversy over tax exemption and environmental concerns. A pumping station named Hope was built along the pipeline.

== Geography ==
According to the U.S. Census Bureau, the county has an area of 852 square miles (2,210 km^{2}), of which 847 square miles (2,190 km^{2}) is land and 4.9 square miles (13 km^{2}) (0.6%) is water.

=== Adjacent counties ===
- Clay County (north)
- Geary County (east)
- Morris County (southeast)
- Marion County (south)
- McPherson County (southwest)
- Saline County (west)
- Ottawa County (northwest)

== Demographics ==
Historical population
Census	Pop.	Note	%±
1860	378		—
1870	3,043		705.0%
1880	15,251		401.2%
1890	22,273		46.0%
1900	21,816		−2.1%
1910	24,361		11.7%
1920	25,777		5.8%
1930	25,870		0.4%
1940	22,929		−11.4%
1950	21,190		−7.6%
1960	21,572		1.8%
1970	19,993		−7.3%
1980	20,175		0.9%
1990	18,958		−6.0%
2000	19,344		2.0%
2010	19,754		2.1%
2020	18,402		−6.8%
2025 (est.)	18,637	▲	1.3%
U.S. Decennial Census; 1790-1960 1900-1990; 1990-2000 2010-2020

=== Racial and ethnic composition ===
Dickinson County, Kansas – Racial and ethnic composition Note: the US Census treats Hispanic/Latino as an ethnic category. This table excludes Latinos from the racial categories and assigns them to a separate category. Hispanics/Latinos may be of any race.
Race / Ethnicity (NH = Non-Hispanic)	Pop 1980	Pop 1990	Pop 2000	Pop 2010	Pop 2020	% 1980	% 1990	% 2000	% 2010	% 2020
White alone (NH)	19,688	18,374	18,406	18,312	16,451	97.59%	96.92%	95.15%	92.70%	89.40%
Black or African American alone (NH)	72	122	101	139	105	0.36%	0.64%	0.52%	0.70%	0.57%
Native American or Alaska Native alone (NH)	34	63	85	82	74	0.17%	0.33%	0.44%	0.42%	0.40%
Asian alone (NH)	43	54	58	59	74	0.21%	0.28%	0.30%	0.30%	0.40%
Native Hawaiian or Pacific Islander alone (NH)	x	x	2	11	20	x	x	0.01%	0.06%	0.11%
Other race alone (NH)	12	4	10	17	68	0.06%	0.02%	0.05%	0.09%	0.37%
Mixed race or Multiracial (NH)	x	x	237	365	705	x	x	1.23%	1.85%	3.83%
Hispanic or Latino (any race)	326	341	445	769	905	1.62%	1.80%	2.30%	3.89%	4.92%
Total	20,175	18,958	19,344	19,754	18,402	100.00%	100.00%	100.00%	100.00%	100.00%

=== 2020 census ===
As of the 2020 census, the county had a population of 18,402, the median age was 43.5 years, 23.4% of residents were under the age of 18, and 21.1% were 65 years of age or older. For every 100 females there were 98.6 males, and for every 100 females age 18 and over there were 96.9 males age 18 and over. 35.9% of residents lived in urban areas, while 64.1% lived in rural areas.

The racial makeup of the county was 91.4% White, 0.6% Black or African American, 0.5% American Indian and Alaska Native, 0.4% Asian, 0.1% Native Hawaiian and Pacific Islander, 1.3% from some other race, and 5.6% from two or more races. Hispanic or Latino residents of any race comprised 4.9% of the population.

There were 7,644 households in the county, of which 28.0% had children under the age of 18 living with them and 23.4% had a female householder with no spouse or partner present. About 30.3% of all households were made up of individuals and 14.9% had someone living alone who was 65 years of age or older.

There were 8,778 housing units, of which 12.9% were vacant. Among occupied housing units, 72.7% were owner-occupied and 27.3% were renter-occupied. The homeowner vacancy rate was 3.3% and the rental vacancy rate was 13.2%.

=== 2000 census ===
As of the 2000 census, there were 19,344 people, 7,903 households, and 5,421 families residing in the county. The population density was 23 people per square mile (8.9 people/km^{2}). There were 8,686 housing units at an average density of 10 per square mile (3.9/km^{2}). The county's racial makeup was 96.44% White, 0.58% Black or African American, 0.49% Native American, 0.30% Asian, 0.01% Pacific Islander, 0.82% from other races, and 1.36% from two or more races. Hispanic or Latino of any race were 2.30% of the population.

There were 7,903 households, of which 31.10% had children under the age of 18 living with them, 57.90% were married couples living together, 7.70% had a female householder with no husband present, and 31.40% were non-families. 28.10% of households were made up of individuals, and 14.10% had someone living alone who was 65 years of age or older. The average household size was 2.40 and the average family size was 2.94.

In the county, the population was spread out, with 25.70% under the age of 18, 6.30% from 18 to 24, 26.30% from 25 to 44, 23.10% from 45 to 64, and 18.60% who were 65 years of age or older. The median age was 40 years. For every 100 females there were 95.10 males. For every 100 females age 18 and over, there were 91.60 males.

The county's median household income was $35,975, and the median family income was $43,952. Males had a median income of $30,889 versus $18,526 for females. The per capita income in the county was $17,780. About 5.30% of families and 7.50% of the population were below the poverty line, including 8.70% of those under age 18 and 11.30% of those age 65 or over.

== Government ==
=== Presidential elections ===
Presidential election results

United States presidential election results for Dickinson County, Kansas
Year	Republican		Democratic		Third party(ies)	
Year	No.	%	No.	%	No.	%
1888	2,746	54.15%	1,695	33.43%	630	12.42%
1892	2,419	47.14%	0	0.00%	2,712	52.86%
1896	2,291	48.31%	2,399	50.59%	52	1.10%
1900	2,771	52.93%	2,352	44.93%	112	2.14%
1904	3,185	66.88%	1,219	25.60%	358	7.52%
1908	2,886	53.31%	2,282	42.15%	246	4.54%
1912	988	18.31%	2,182	40.44%	2,225	41.24%
1916	4,323	45.06%	4,974	51.85%	296	3.09%
1920	5,761	69.10%	2,387	28.63%	189	2.27%
1924	6,178	64.58%	1,690	17.67%	1,698	17.75%
1928	7,758	77.04%	2,246	22.30%	66	0.66%
1932	5,320	49.04%	5,339	49.21%	190	1.75%
1936	5,936	52.61%	5,313	47.09%	34	0.30%
1940	6,931	63.25%	3,957	36.11%	70	0.64%
1944	6,227	65.92%	3,190	33.77%	29	0.31%
1948	5,918	59.98%	3,815	38.66%	134	1.36%
1952	8,969	81.78%	1,967	17.94%	31	0.28%
1956	7,422	74.91%	2,452	24.75%	34	0.34%
1960	6,956	69.18%	3,054	30.37%	45	0.45%
1964	4,704	53.17%	4,070	46.00%	73	0.83%
1968	5,574	64.32%	2,399	27.68%	693	8.00%
1972	6,515	75.34%	1,957	22.63%	175	2.02%
1976	4,759	55.23%	3,672	42.61%	186	2.16%
1980	5,654	67.64%	2,108	25.22%	597	7.14%
1984	6,487	73.96%	2,168	24.72%	116	1.32%
1988	5,121	63.28%	2,870	35.47%	101	1.25%
1992	3,851	41.76%	2,518	27.31%	2,852	30.93%
1996	5,174	60.53%	2,423	28.35%	951	11.13%
2000	5,243	64.79%	2,413	29.82%	436	5.39%
2004	6,295	71.61%	2,364	26.89%	132	1.50%
2008	6,081	70.16%	2,422	27.95%	164	1.89%
2012	5,832	72.52%	2,020	25.12%	190	2.36%
2016	6,029	73.43%	1,609	19.60%	572	6.97%
2020	7,126	76.22%	2,060	22.03%	163	1.74%
2024	7,014	76.71%	1,989	21.75%	141	1.54%

=== Laws ===
Dickinson County was a prohibition, or "dry", county until the Kansas Constitution was amended in 1986 and voters approved the sale of alcoholic liquor by the individual drink with a 30% food sales requirement.

== Education ==
=== Unified school districts ===
School districts covering the county include:

- Solomon USD 393
- Abilene USD 435
- Chapman USD 473
- Herington USD 487

School district office in neighboring county

- Centre USD 397
- Rural Vista USD 481
- Southeast of Saline USD 306

== Communities ==
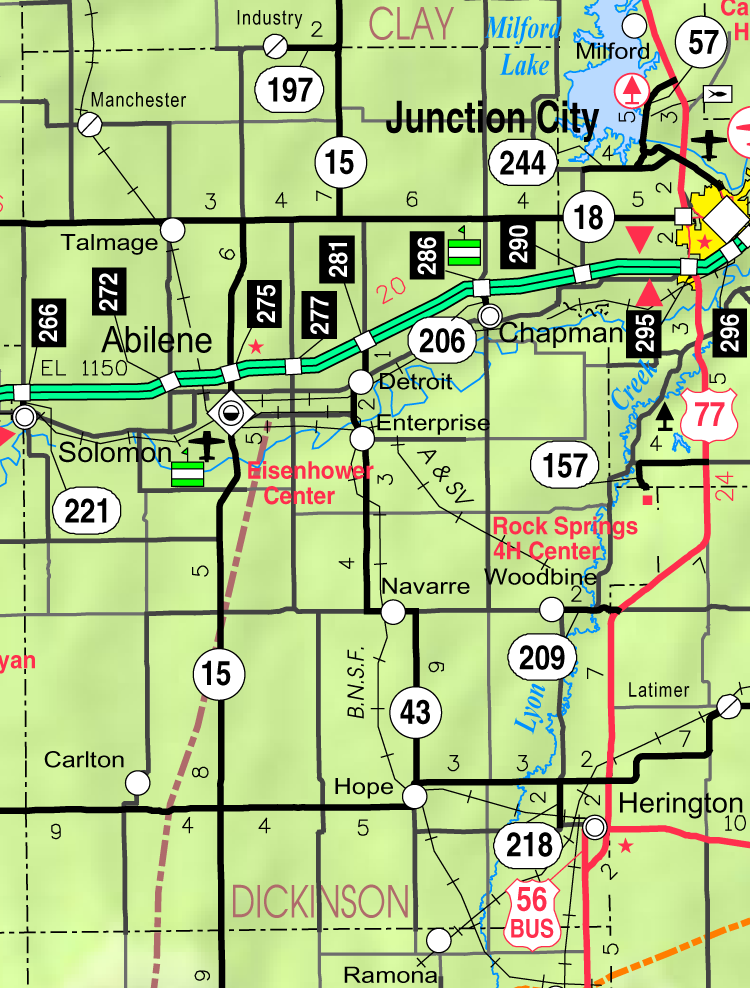
2005 map of Dickinson County (map legend)

List of townships / incorporated cities / unincorporated communities / extinct former communities within Dickinson County.

=== Cities ===
‡ means a community has portions in an adjacent county.

- Abilene (county seat)
- Carlton
- Chapman
- Enterprise
- Herington‡
- Hope
- Manchester
- Solomon‡
- Woodbine

=== Unincorporated communities ===
† means a community is designated a Census-Designated Place (CDP) by the United States Census Bureau.

- Acme
- Bonaccord
- Buckeye
- Dayton
- Detroit†
- Dillon
- Donegal
- Elmo
- Holland
- Industry‡
- Lyona
- Manchester
- Moonlight
- Navarre†
- Pearl
- Rhinehardt
- Shady Brook
- Stitt
- Stoney
- Sutphen
- Talmage†
- Upland

=== Townships ===
Dickinson County is divided into twenty-four townships. The cities of Abilene and Herington are considered governmentally independent and are excluded from the census figures for the townships. In the following table, the population center is the largest city (or cities) included in that township's population total, if it is of a significant size.

Township	FIPS	Population center	Population	Population density /km^{2} (/sq mi)	Land area km^{2} (sq mi)	Water area km^{2} (sq mi)	Water %	Geographic coordinates
Banner	03975		148	2 (4)	92 (35)	1 (0)	0.62%	38°39′37″N 97°11′50″W
Buckeye	08925		437	5 (12)	94 (36)	0 (0)	0.15%	38°59′1″N 97°12′58″W
Center	11675		1,210	13 (34)	92 (35)	2 (1)	2.16%	38°54′32″N 97°6′21″W
Cheever	12700		149	2 (4)	93 (36)	0 (0)	0.04%	39°5′58″N 97°11′42″W
Flora	23550		217	2 (6)	93 (36)	0 (0)	0.08%	39°5′12″N 97°19′4″W
Fragrant Hill	24250		251	3 (8)	77 (30)	0 (0)	0.21%	39°4′54″N 97°0′34″W
Garfield	25550		189	2 (5)	94 (36)	0 (0)	0.06%	38°49′22″N 97°18′43″W
Grant	27625		918	11 (29)	82 (32)	1 (1)	1.58%	38°54′42″N 97°12′22″W
Hayes	30900		233	3 (8)	78 (30)	0 (0)	0.04%	38°59′43″N 97°6′8″W
Holland	32625		107	1 (3)	93 (36)	0 (0)	0.17%	38°40′19″N 97°18′39″W
Hope	33100		519	6 (15)	92 (35)	0 (0)	0.45%	38°39′36″N 97°5′13″W
Jefferson	35175		166	2 (5)	94 (36)	0 (0)	0.46%	38°44′1″N 97°11′45″W
Liberty	40000		405	4 (9)	114 (44)	0 (0)	0.11%	38°49′11″N 96°57′35″W
Lincoln	40625		1,669	18 (46)	93 (36)	2 (1)	1.99%	38°54′51″N 97°20′46″W
Logan	41850		202	2 (6)	94 (36)	0 (0)	0.23%	38°49′12″N 97°5′3″W
Lyon	43475		252	3 (8)	86 (33)	1 (0)	0.98%	38°39′32″N 96°59′20″W
Newbern	50225		349	4 (10)	94 (36)	0 (0)	0.14%	38°50′6″N 97°11′43″W
Noble	50800		1,730	21 (55)	81 (31)	1 (0)	1.29%	38°58′59″N 97°0′23″W
Ridge	59800		160	2 (4)	94 (36)	0 (0)	0.43%	38°44′14″N 97°5′0″W
Rinehart	59900		194	2 (5)	93 (36)	0 (0)	0.40%	38°55′18″N 96°59′30″W
Sherman	64925		147	2 (5)	78 (30)	0 (0)	0%	39°5′6″N 97°6′10″W
Union	72100		176	2 (5)	94 (36)	0 (0)	0.20%	38°43′38″N 96°58′14″W
Wheatland	77625		152	2 (4)	93 (36)	0 (0)	0.18%	38°43′59″N 97°18′27″W
Willowdale	79450		258	3 (7)	93 (36)	0 (0)	0.05%	38°59′41″N 97°18′7″W
Sources: "Census 2000 U.S. Gazetteer Files". U.S. Census Bureau, Geography Division. Archived from the original on August 2, 2002.

== Points of interest ==
The Eisenhower Library is in Abilene. In addition to exhibits relating to the life and presidency of the 34th US president, the site is also the location of the tombs of President Eisenhower, First Lady Mamie Eisenhower, and their son who died in infancy.

== Notable people ==
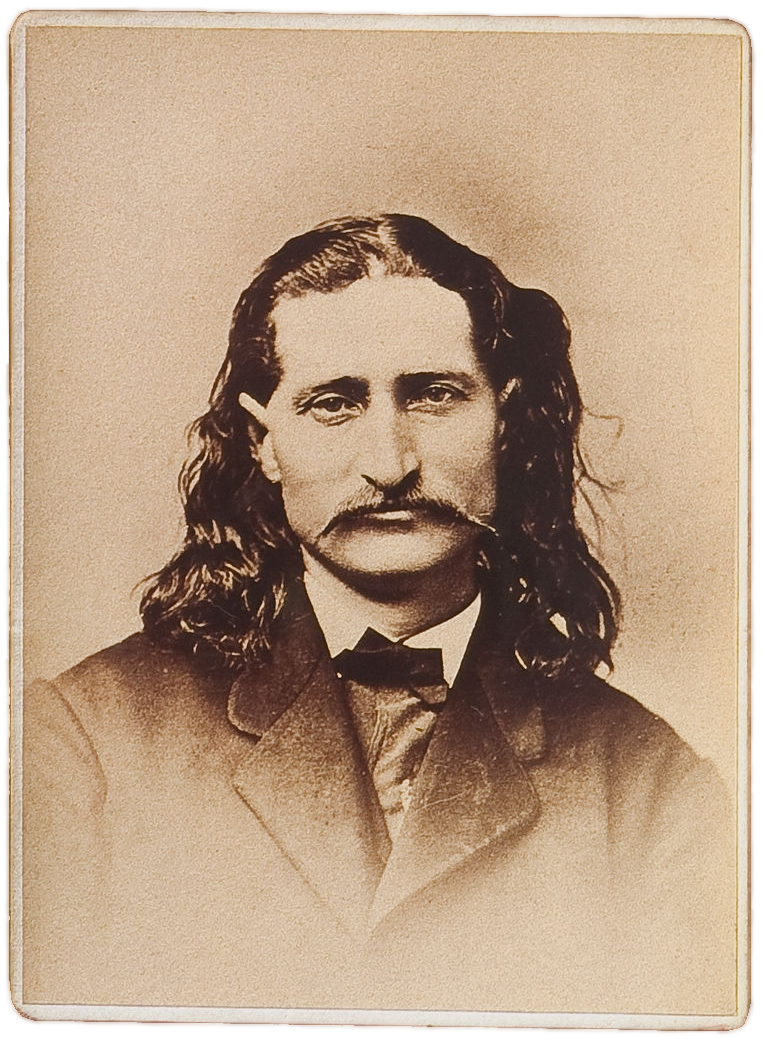
On April 15, 1871, Wild Bill Hickok became marshal of Abilene after its previous marshal was shot and killed.

Dwight David "Ike" Eisenhower was born in Texas but moved to Abilene at an early age and considered Abilene home. He was the 34th President of the United States from 1953 until 1961. Prior to that he was a five-star general in the United States Army. During World War II, as Supreme Commander of the Allied Forces in Europe; he planned and supervised the invasion of North Africa in Operation Torch in 1942–43 and the invasion of France and Germany in 1944–45, from the Western Front. In 1951, he became the first supreme commander of NATO. The Eisenhower Library (see above) is in Abilene.

Joe Engle is a retired U.S. Air Force colonel and a former NASA astronaut. Engle helped to flight test the joint NASA-Air Force X-15 rocket airplane. During testing, Engle earned his USAF astronaut wings, a Distinguished Flying Cross and other awards. He was one of the first astronauts in the Space Shuttle program and flight tested the Space Shuttle Enterprise in 1977. He was commander of the second orbital test flight of the Space Shuttle Columbia in 1981. Engle was born and raised in Chapman.

Several figures from the American Old West spent time in the county. Folk hero James Butler "Wild Bill" Hickok, gunfighter John Wesley Hardin, and dance hall girl/prostitute Libby Thompson all made their mark in Abilene when it was in its wild cattle-town days.

US Army Chaplains John H. Eastwood and Emil Kapaun were stationed at Herington Army Airfield for part of their tour of duty during World War II.

Pop Hollinger pioneered the industry of comic book collecting and also managed to secure several patents. He grew up in Chapman.

== See also ==
- List of people from Dickinson County, Kansas
- National Register of Historic Places listings in Dickinson County, Kansas

Community information for Kansas

- Kansas locations by per capita income
- List of counties in Kansas
- List of townships in Kansas
- List of cities in Kansas
- List of unincorporated communities in Kansas
- List of ghost towns in Kansas
