= Liberty Township, Dickinson County, Kansas =

Liberty Township
- Township
- Location in Dickinson County
- Coordinates: 38°49′35″N 096°58′21″W
- Country: United States
- State: Kansas
- County: Dickinson

Area
  - Total: 43.89 sq mi (113.67 km^{2})
  - Land: 43.84 sq mi (113.55 km^{2})
  - Water: 0.046 sq mi (0.12 km^{2}) 0.11%
- Elevation: 1,286 ft (392 m)

Population (2020)
  - Total: 308
  - Density: 7.03/sq mi (2.71/km^{2})
- GNIS feature ID: 0476861

Liberty Township is a township in Dickinson County, Kansas, United States. As of the 2020 census, its population was 308.

== History ==
Liberty Township was organized in 1873.

== Geography ==
Liberty Township covers an area of 43.89 square miles (113.7 km^{2}) and contains one incorporated settlement, Woodbine, and one unincorporated settlement, Lyona. It contains three cemeteries: Lyona, Riffel, and Woodbine.
