= Ridge Township, Dickinson County, Kansas =

Ridge Township
- Township
- Location in Dickinson County
- Coordinates: 38°44′20″N 097°05′36″W
- Country: United States
- State: Kansas
- County: Dickinson

Area
  - Total: 36.31 sq mi (94.05 km^{2})
  - Land: 36.16 sq mi (93.65 km^{2})
  - Water: 0.16 sq mi (0.41 km^{2}) 0.44%
- Elevation: 1,342 ft (409 m)

Population (2020)
  - Total: 132
  - Density: 3.65/sq mi (1.41/km^{2})
- GNIS ID: 0476857

Ridge Township is a township in Dickinson County, Kansas, United States. As of the 2020 census, its population was 132.

== History ==
Ridge Township was organized in 1872.

== Geography ==
Ridge Township covers an area of 36.31 square miles (94.0 km^{2}) and contains no incorporated settlements. According to the USGS, it contains one cemetery, Pilgrims Home.

== Demographics ==
As of the 2020 Census, the total population was 132 people. The population density was 3.64 people per square mile, spread over 31.36 miles. Of those people, the median age was 42 years, with 30.4% of the town's population under the age of 18, 51.5% between the ages of 18 and 64, and 18.1% of the population over the age of 65. There were a total of 61 households, with an average of 2.16 people per household.

The racial makeup of the town was 95.5% White, 0% African American, 0% Native American, 3% mixed race, and 2% Hispanic. The median household income was $43,365. 12.9% of the town's population lives under the poverty line. 62.7% of the population of the town is identified as currently married.

42.2% of the Ridge Township population has received a high school degree, and 17.5% of the town's population have received college degrees.

5.0% of the town's population were veterans, all of which were male.
