= Hope Township, Kansas =

Hope Township
- Township
- Location in Dickinson County
- Coordinates: 38°39′10″N 097°05′46″W
- Country: United States
- State: Kansas
- County: Dickinson

Area
  - Total: 35.62 sq mi (92.26 km^{2})
  - Land: 35.46 sq mi (91.85 km^{2})
  - Water: 0.16 sq mi (0.42 km^{2}) 0.46%
- Elevation: 1,394 ft (425 m)

Population (2020)
  - Total: 438
  - Density: 12.4/sq mi (4.77/km^{2})
- GNIS ID: 476980

Hope Township is a township in Dickinson County, Kansas, United States. Its population was 438 as of the 2020 census.

== History ==
Hope Township was organized in 1872.

== Geography ==
Hope Township covers an area of 35.62 square miles (92.3 km^{2}) and contains one incorporated settlement, Hope. According to the USGS, it contains two cemeteries: Ashton and Saint Phillips.

== Demographics ==
According to the 2020 Census conducted by the US Census Bureau, there was a total population of 541 people in 227 households, with an average family size of 2.4 people per household. The median age of Hope Township was 42.9 years old. In 2020, there were more men in Hope Township, a 56% (men) to 44% (women) ratio. With 95% of the population identifying as white, the second largest race or ethnicity were Hispanics, making up around 2% of the population. Asian and Mixed Race were tied at 1% of the population while less than 1% of the population was of Native American descent. The town reported 0 African American residents. 57% of the town's population are currently married, with 34.5% of women aged 15–50 having given birth in 2020.

The income per capita of Hope Township was only $25,250 in 2020, far below the Kansas average of $32,798. The median household income was $48,942, which is again less than the state average of $61,091. According to the census, 21.6% of the population live under the poverty line, which is almost twice the state average of 11.4% of the state population. 30% of the children under 18 in the township live under the poverty line, and 2% of seniors 65 years or older live under the poverty line.

Only 88.7% of the Hope Township population have received a high school diploma, and only 15.4% of the population have received a bachelor's degree or higher. Both statistics are far below the Kansas state average.

Of the 541 people in the town, 53 of them are veterans which is 13.1% of the population which is higher than the state average of 7.9%. Of those 53, 49 are male and 4 are female. 3 served in Korea, 23 in Vietnam, 5 in the Gulf war in the 1990s, and 12 served in the Gulf area post 2001.
