= Rural Vista USD 481 =

Public school district in White City, Kansas

Address
- 414 E. Goodnow St. White City, Kansas, 66872; United States
- Coordinates: 38°47′49″N 96°43′54″W

District information
- Type: Public
- Grades: K to 12
- Superintendent: Darlene Griffiths
- Schools: 4

Other information
- Website: usd481.org

Rural Vista USD 481 is a public unified school district headquartered in White City, Kansas, United States. The district includes the communities of Hope, White City, Woodbine, Latimer, Parkerville, Skiddy, Dillon, Shady Brook, and nearby rural areas of Dickinson and Morris Counties.

== Schools ==
The school district operates the following schools:

- Hope High School in Hope.
- White City High School in White City.
- Hope Elementary School in Hope.
- White City Elementary School in White City.

== See also ==
- Kansas State Department of Education
- Kansas State High School Activities Association
- List of high schools in Kansas
- List of unified school districts in Kansas
