= Rinehart Township, Kansas =

Rinehart Township
- Township
- Location in Dickinson County
- Coordinates: 38°54′50″N 096°57′51″W
- Country: United States
- State: Kansas
- County: Dickinson

Area
  - Total: 35.95 sq mi (93.11 km^{2})
  - Land: 35.81 sq mi (92.74 km^{2})
  - Water: 0.14 sq mi (0.37 km^{2}) 0.4%
- Elevation: 1,253 ft (382 m)

Population (2020)
  - Total: 232
  - Density: 6.48/sq mi (2.50/km^{2})
- GNIS feature ID: 0476693

Rinehart Township is a township in Dickinson County, Kansas, United States. As of the 2020 census, its population was 232.

== Geography ==
Rinehart Township covers an area of 35.95 square miles (93.1 km^{2}) and contains no incorporated settlements. According to the USGS, it contains one cemetery, Rinehart.
