= Logan Township, Dickinson County, Kansas =

Logan Township
- Township
- Location in Dickinson County
- Coordinates: 38°49′40″N 097°05′36″W
- Country: United States
- State: Kansas
- County: Dickinson

Area
  - Total: 36.2 sq mi (93.8 km^{2})
  - Land: 36.13 sq mi (93.58 km^{2})
  - Water: 0.085 sq mi (0.22 km^{2}) 0.23%
- Elevation: 1,289 ft (393 m)

Population (2020)
  - Total: 170
  - Density: 4.7/sq mi (1.8/km^{2})
- GNIS feature ID: 0476856

Logan Township is a township in Dickinson County, Kansas, United States. As of the 2020 census, its population was 170.

== History ==
Logan Township was organized in 1877.

== Geography ==
Logan Township covers an area of 36.21 square miles (93.8 km^{2}) and contains no incorporated settlements. According to the USGS, it contains two cemeteries: Belle Spring and Scheiller.
