= Dillon, Kansas =

Unincorporated community in Dickinson County, Kansas

- Unincorporated community
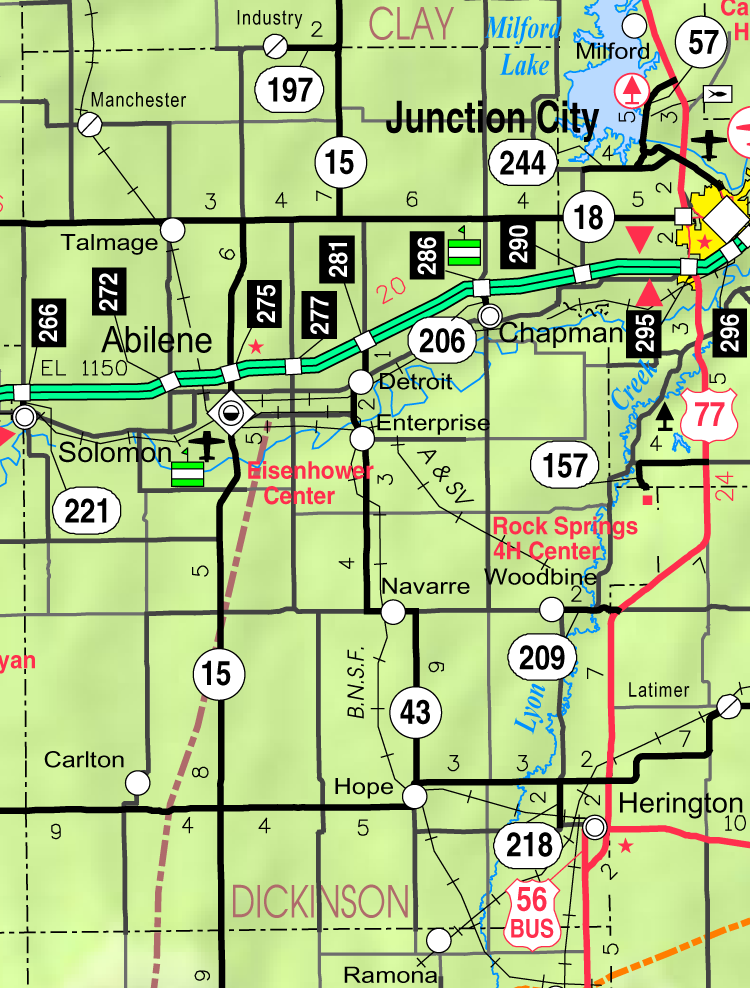
- KDOT map of Dickinson County (legend)

- Location within Kansas Location within the United States
- Coordinates: 38°41′37″N 97°8′49″W
- Country: United States
- State: Kansas
- County: Dickinson
- Elevation: 1,299 ft (396 m)
- Time zone: UTC-6 (CST)
  - Summer (DST): UTC-5 (CDT)
- Area code: 785
- FIPS code: 20-18100
- GNIS ID: 484800

Dillon is an unincorporated community in Dickinson County, Kansas, United States.

== History ==
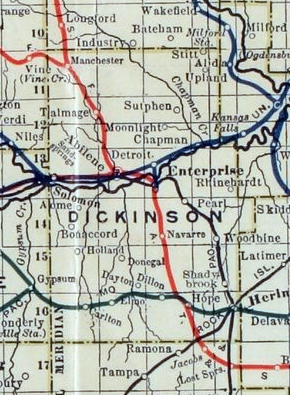
1915 railroad map of Dickinson County

=== Early history ===
For many millennia, the Great Plains of North America was inhabited by nomadic Native Americans. From the 16th century to 18th century, the Kingdom of France claimed ownership of large parts of North America. In 1762, after the French and Indian War, France secretly ceded New France to Spain, per the Treaty of Fontainebleau.

=== 19th century ===
In 1802, Spain returned most of the land to France. In 1803, most of the land for modern day Kansas was acquired by the United States from France as part of the 828,000 square mile Louisiana Purchase for 2.83 cents per acre.

In 1854, the Kansas Territory was organized, then in 1861 Kansas became the 34th U.S. state. In 1857, Dickinson County was established within the Kansas Territory, which included the land for modern day Dillon.

Dillon was a station on the Missouri Pacific Railroad. A post office was opened in Dillon in 1872, and remained in operation until it was discontinued in 1944.

== Education ==
The community is served by Rural Vista USD 481 public school district.
