= Cheever Township, Kansas =

Cheever Township
- Township
- Location in Dickinson County
- Coordinates: 39°05′30″N 097°14′31″W
- Country: United States
- State: Kansas
- County: Dickinson

Area
  - Total: 35.88 sq mi (92.94 km^{2})
  - Land: 35.9 sq mi (92.9 km^{2})
  - Water: 0.015 sq mi (0.04 km^{2}) 0.04%
- Elevation: 1,332 ft (406 m)

Population (2020)
  - Total: 165
  - Density: 4.60/sq mi (1.78/km^{2})
- GNIS feature ID: 0476308

Cheever Township is a township in Dickinson County, Kansas, United States. As of the 2020 census, its population was 165.

Cheever Township was organized in 1873.

== Geography ==
Cheever Township covers an area of 35.88 square miles (92.9 km^{2}) and contains no incorporated settlements. According to the USGS, it contains one cemetery, Henry.
