= Jefferson Township, Dickinson County, Kansas =

Jefferson Township
- Township
- Location in Dickinson County
- Coordinates: 38°44′25″N 097°12′16″W
- Country: United States
- State: Kansas
- County: Dickinson

Area
  - Total: 36.34 sq mi (94.11 km^{2})
  - Land: 36.17 sq mi (93.68 km^{2})
  - Water: 0.17 sq mi (0.43 km^{2}) 0.46%
- Elevation: 1,280 ft (390 m)

Population (2020)
  - Total: 216
  - Density: 5.97/sq mi (2.31/km^{2})
- GNIS feature ID: 0476848

Jefferson Township is a township in Dickinson County, Kansas, United States. As of the 2020 census, its population was 216.

Jefferson Township was organized in 1873.

== Geography ==
Jefferson Township covers an area of 36.34 square miles (94.1 km^{2}) and contains no incorporated settlements.
