= Noble Township, Dickinson County, Kansas =

Noble Township
- Township
- Location in Dickinson County
- Coordinates: 39°00′10″N 097°00′31″W
- Country: United States
- State: Kansas
- County: Dickinson

Area
  - Total: 31.73 sq mi (82.17 km^{2})
  - Land: 31.32 sq mi (81.11 km^{2})
  - Water: 0.41 sq mi (1.06 km^{2}) 1.29%
- Elevation: 1,119 ft (341 m)

Population (2020)
  - Total: 1,863
  - Density: 59.49/sq mi (22.97/km^{2})
- GNIS feature ID: 0476494

Noble Township is a township in Dickinson County, Kansas, United States. As of the 2020 census, its population was 1,863.

== History ==
Noble Township was organized in 1873.

== Geography ==
Noble Township covers an area of 31.73 square miles (82.2 km^{2}) and contains one incorporated settlement, Chapman. According to the USGS, it contains two cemeteries: Good Hope and Indian Hill.

The stream of Chapman Creek runs through this township.
