= Lyona, Kansas =

Unincorporated community in Dickinson County, Kansas

- Unincorporated community
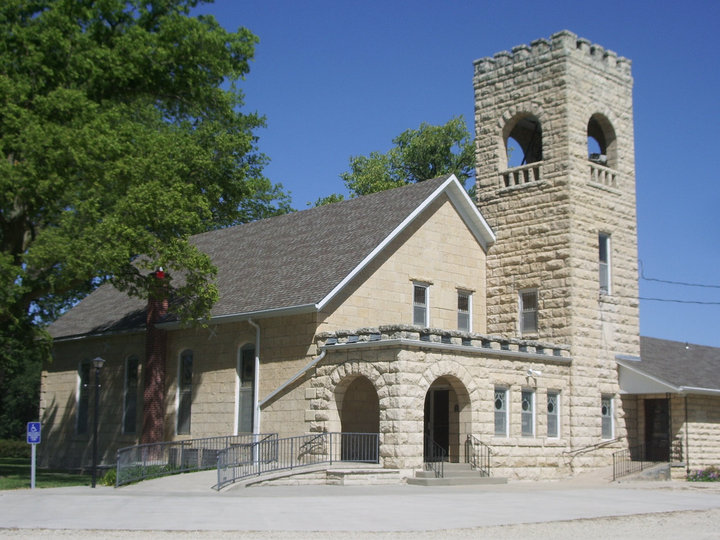
- Lyona United Methodist Church (2011)

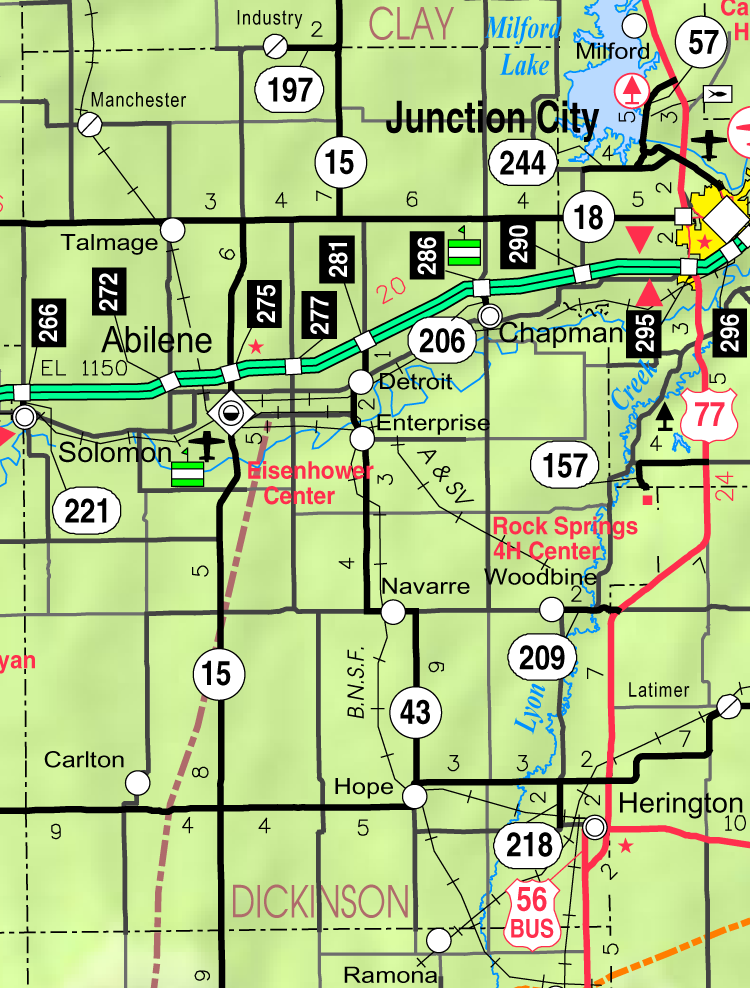
- KDOT map of Dickinson County (legend)

- Location within Kansas Location within the United States
- Coordinates: 38°51′43″N 96°55′33″W
- Country: United States
- State: Kansas
- County: Dickinson
- Township: Liberty
- Elevation: 1,152 ft (351 m)
- Time zone: UTC-6 (CST)
  - Summer (DST): UTC-5 (CDT)
- Area code: 785
- FIPS code: 20-43510
- GNIS ID: 484795

Lyona is an unincorporated community in Dickinson County, Kansas, United States. It is located on Wolf Rd approximately 8.7 miles (14.0 km) southwest of Junction City or 12.3 miles (19.8 km) north of Herington, also it is 1.5 miles (2.4 km) west of the Rock Springs 4-H Camp.

== History ==
Lyona once had a post office; it closed in 1888.

== Education ==
The community is served by Chapman USD 473 public school district.
