= Industry, Kansas =

Unincorporated community in Dickinson County, Kansas

- Unincorporated community
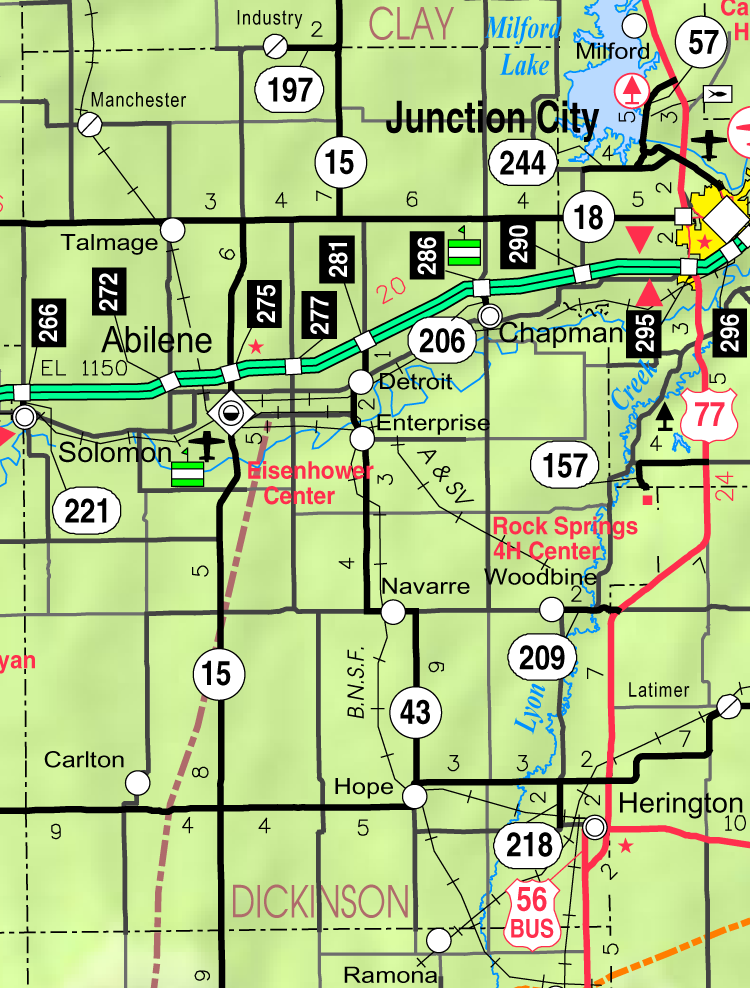
- KDOT map of Dickinson County (legend)

- Location within Kansas Location within the United States
- Coordinates: 39°08′00″N 97°10′17″W
- Country: United States
- State: Kansas
- County: Dickinson
- Founded: 1870s
- Elevation: 1,181 ft (360 m)
- Time zone: UTC-6 (CST)
  - Summer (DST): UTC-5 (CDT)
- Area code: 785
- FIPS code: 20-34200
- GNIS ID: 476317

Industry is an unincorporated community in Clay and Dickinson counties in the U.S. state of Kansas. It is located approximately 13 miles north of Abilene.

== History ==
A post office was established at Lovejoy (an extinct town) in 1873, and moved to Industry in 1876 where it remained in operation until it was discontinued in 1906.

== Education ==
The community is served by Chapman USD 473 public school district in Dickinson County, and Clay County USD 379 in Clay County.
