= Buckeye, Kansas =

Unincorporated community in Dickinson County, Kansas

Coordinates: 39°02′48″N 97°10′01″W

Buckeye is an unincorporated community in Dickinson County, Kansas, United States.

== History ==
Buckeye was started as a colony/settlement by Universalist preacher Vear P. Wilson. Buckeye colony had nearly two hundred settlers and a church built by 1870.

Buckeye had a post office from 1900 until 1904.

== Education ==
The community is served by Chapman USD 473 public school district.
