= Acme, Kansas =

Unincorporated community in Dickinson County, Kansas

Coordinates: 38°50′33″N 97°15′39″W

Acme is an unincorporated community in Dickinson County, Kansas, United States.

== History ==
A post office was opened in Acme in 1897, and remained in operation until it was discontinued in 1906.

== Education ==
The community is served by Chapman USD 473 public school district.
