= Moonlight, Kansas =

Unincorporated community in Dickinson County, Kansas

Coordinates: 39°00′10″N 97°06′09″W

Moonlight is an unincorporated community in Hayes Township, Dickinson County, Kansas, United States.

== History ==
Moonlight was named for Thomas Moonlight, Kansas Secretary of State.

== Education ==
The community is served by Chapman USD 473 public school district.
