= Skiddy, Kansas =

Unincorporated community in Morris County, Kansas

- Unincorporated community
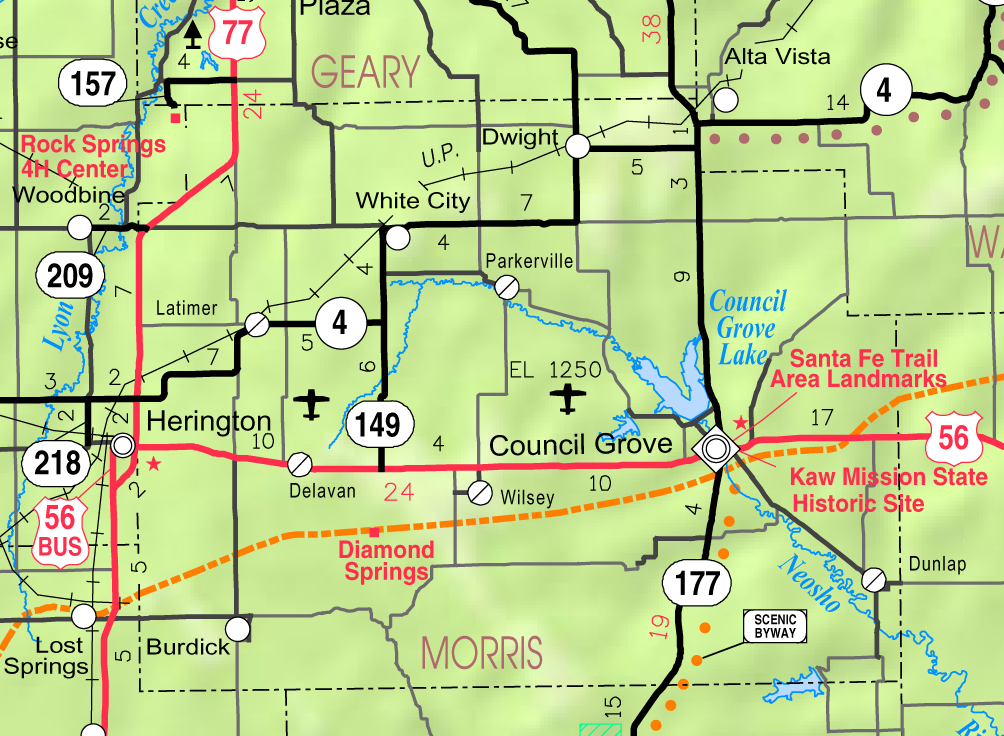
- KDOT map of Morris County (legend)

- Location within Kansas Location within the United States
- Coordinates: 38°52′5″N 96°47′40″W
- Country: United States
- State: Kansas
- County: Morris
- Founded: 1870
- Named for: Francis Skiddy
- Elevation: 1,240 ft (380 m)
- Time zone: UTC-6 (CST)
  - Summer (DST): UTC-5 (CDT)
- Area code: 785
- FIPS code: 20-65775
- GNIS ID: 476875

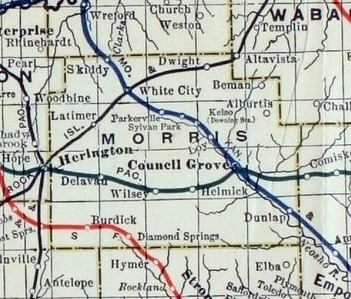
1915 railroad map of Morris County

Skiddy is an unincorporated community in Morris County, Kansas, United States.

== History ==
Skiddy was founded in 1870. It was named after railroad magnate Francis Skiddy. Between March 11, 1879, and August 3, 1883, it was renamed Camden before reverting to the name Skiddy.

The post office in Skiddy was discontinued in 1953. The Missouri–Kansas–Texas Railroad served Skiddy for many years, and the grain elevator adjacent to the railroad tracks still stands today.

== Education ==
The community is served by Rural Vista USD 481 public school district.
