= Newbern Township, Kansas =

Newbern Township
- Township
- Location in Dickinson County
- Coordinates: 38°49′40″N 097°12′16″W
- Country: United States
- State: Kansas
- County: Dickinson

Area
  - Total: 36.49 sq mi (94.52 km^{2})
  - Land: 36.44 sq mi (94.39 km^{2})
  - Water: 0.050 sq mi (0.13 km^{2}) 0.14%
- Elevation: 1,211 ft (369 m)

Population (2020)
  - Total: 362
  - Density: 9.93/sq mi (3.84/km^{2})
- Time zone: UTC-6 (Central Standard Time)
  - Summer (DST): UTC-5 (Central Daylight Time)
- Area code: +1-785
- GNIS feature ID: 0485530

Newbern Township is a township in Dickinson County, Kansas, United States. As of the 2020 census, its population was 362.

== Geography ==
Newbern Township covers an area of 36.49 square miles (94.5 km^{2}) and contains no incorporated settlements. According to the USGS, it contains two cemeteries: Farmington and Newburn.

The stream of West Branch Turkey Creek runs through this township.
