= Shady Brook, Kansas =

Unincorporated community in Dickinson County, Kansas

Coordinates: 38°44′22″N 96°58′59″W

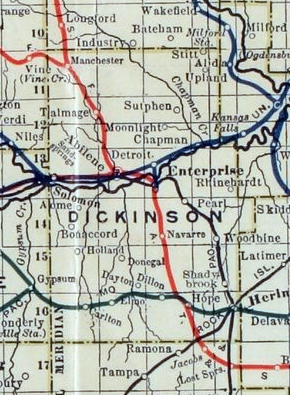
1915-1918 railroad map of Dickinson County

Shady Brook is an unincorporated community in Dickinson County, Kansas, United States. It is located at the intersection of 1000 Ave and Trail Rd.

== History ==
Shady Brook (spelled historically Shadybrook) had a post office from 1901 until 1907.

== Education ==
The west side of Trail Rd is served by Rural Vista USD 481 public school district, the east side of Trail Rd is served by Herington USD 487 public school district.
