= Upland, Kansas =

Unincorporated community in Dickinson County, Kansas

Coordinates: 39°05′20″N 97°01′09″W

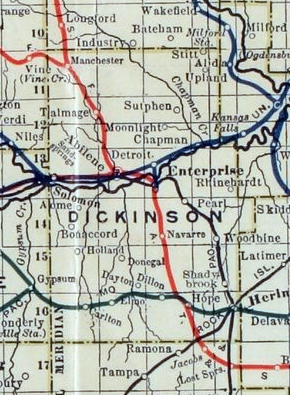
1915-1918 railroad map of Dickinson County

Upland is an unincorporated community in Dickinson County, Kansas, United States.

== History ==
Upland had a post office from 1898 until 1906.

It once was the home of the Upland Mutual Insurance Company.

== Education ==
The community is served by Chapman USD 473 public school district.
