= Sutphen, Kansas =

Unincorporated community in Dickinson County, Kansas

Coordinates: 39°02′54″N 97°03′19″W

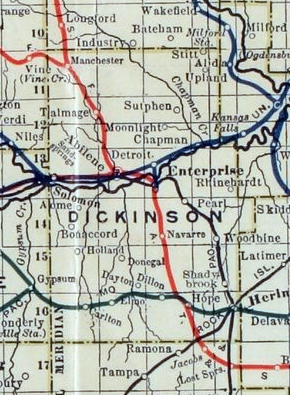
1915-1918 railroad map of Dickinson County

Sutphen is an unincorporated community in Dickinson County, Kansas, United States. It is located north of the intersection of 3100 Ave and Paint Rd.

== History ==
Sutphen had a post office from 1879 until 1905, but the post office was given the name Sutphen's Mill until 1894. Sutphen is named after the town of Zutphen in the Netherlands.

== Education ==
The community is served by Chapman USD 473 public school district.
