= Upland Mutual Insurance Company =

Upland Mutual Insurance Inc.
- Company type: Mutual
- Industry: P&C Insurance
- Founded: 1892
- Headquarters: 2220 Lacy Drive, Junction City, Kansas, United States
- Key people: Chris P. Brown, President, Ronald L. Koester, Treasurer, Richard D Gillispie, Marketing Representative num_employees = 11
- Revenue: +19 million

The Upland Mutual Insurance Inc. is a mutual insurance company in the United States that operates primarily in the state of Kansas. The company's roots go back to 1892 when a group of farmers came together for managing the risk of fire and lightning.

Originally based in unincorporated Upland, Kansas, the company later moved to Junction City, Kansas. The Company's products are marketed through independent insurance agents.

== History ==
In 1896, Upland Mutual Insurance, Inc. was established to offer Fire and Lightning Insurance to local farmers in Upland, Kansas.
