= Navarre, Kansas =

Unincorporated community in Dickinson County, Kansas

- Unincorporated community and CDP
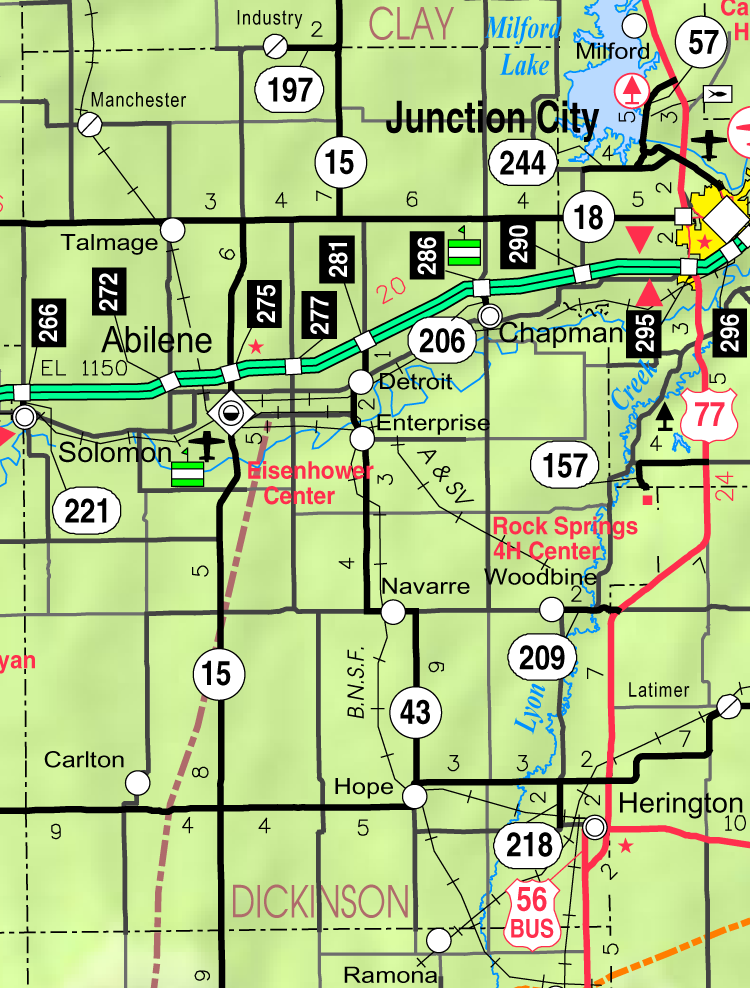
- KDOT map of Dickinson County (legend)

- Location within Kansas Location within the United States
- Coordinates: 38°47′49″N 97°6′21″W
- Country: United States
- State: Kansas
- County: Dickinson
- Elevation: 1,348 ft (411 m)

Population (2020)
  - Total: 52
- Time zone: UTC-6 (CST)
  - Summer (DST): UTC-5 (CDT)
- Area code: 785
- FIPS code: 20-49525
- GNIS ID: 476858

Navarre is an unincorporated community and census-designated place (CDP) in Dickinson County, Kansas, United States. As of the 2020 census, the population was 52.

== History ==
In 1887, Atchison, Topeka and Santa Fe Railway built a branch line from Neva (three miles west of Strong City) through Navarre to Superior, Nebraska. In 1996, the Atchison, Topeka and Santa Fe Railway merged with Burlington Northern Railroad and renamed to the current BNSF Railway. Most locals still refer to this railroad as the "Santa Fe".

The post office was established February 7, 1884, and discontinued September 3, 1971.

The Navarre Church of the Brethren was organized in 1869 and held its last "Homecoming Service" in August 2001, after which the church bell was donated to the Navarre cemetery.

== Demographics ==
Historical population
Census	Pop.	Note	%±
2020	52		—
U.S. Decennial Census

The 2020 United States census counted 52 people, 20 households, and 15 families in Navarre. The population density was 31.6 per square mile (12.2/km^{2}). There were 26 housing units at an average density of 15.8 per square mile (6.1/km^{2}). The racial makeup was 96.15% (50) white or European American (96.15% non-Hispanic white), 0.0% (0) black or African-American, 3.85% (2) Native American or Alaska Native, 0.0% (0) Asian, 0.0% (0) Pacific Islander or Native Hawaiian, 0.0% (0) from other races, and 0.0% (0) from two or more races. Hispanic or Latino of any race was 0.0% (0) of the population.

Of the 20 households, 25.0% had children under the age of 18; 75.0% were married couples living together; 5.0% had a female householder with no spouse or partner present. 25.0% of households consisted of individuals and 15.0% had someone living alone who was 65 years of age or older. The average household size was 2.1 and the average family size was 2.4. The percent of those with a bachelor's degree or higher was estimated to be 0.0% of the population.

21.2% of the population was under the age of 18, 1.9% from 18 to 24, 23.1% from 25 to 44, 32.7% from 45 to 64, and 21.2% who were 65 years of age or older. The median age was 48.5 years. For every 100 females, there were 62.5 males. For every 100 females ages 18 and older, there were 51.9 males.

== Education ==
The community is served by Chapman USD 473 public school district.
