= Fragrant Hill Township, Kansas =

Fragrant Hill Township
- Township
- Location in Dickinson County
- Coordinates: 39°05′30″N 097°00′31″W
- Country: United States
- State: Kansas
- County: Dickinson

Area
  - Total: 29.82 sq mi (77.24 km^{2})
  - Land: 29.76 sq mi (77.08 km^{2})
  - Water: 0.062 sq mi (0.16 km^{2}) 0.21%
- Elevation: 1,270 ft (387 m)

Population (2020)
  - Total: 242
  - Density: 8.13/sq mi (3.14/km^{2})
- GNIS feature ID: 0476320

Fragrant Hill Township is a township in Dickinson County, Kansas, United States. As of the 2020 census, its population was 242.

Fragrant Hill Township was organized in 1880.

== Geography ==
Fragrant Hill Township covers an area of 29.82 square miles (77.2 km^{2}) and contains no incorporated settlements. According to the USGS, it contains two cemeteries: Alida-Upland and Liberty.
