= Banner Township, Dickinson County, Kansas =

Banner Township
- Township
- Interactive map of Banner Township
- Coordinates: 38°39′10″N 097°12′21″W
- Country: United States
- State: Kansas
- County: Dickinson

Area
  - Total: 35.70 sq mi (92.47 km^{2})
  - Land: 35.5 sq mi (91.9 km^{2})
  - Water: 0.22 sq mi (0.57 km^{2}) 0.62%
- Elevation: 1,381 ft (421 m)

Population (2020)
  - Total: 75
  - Density: 2.1/sq mi (0.82/km^{2})
- GNIS feature ID: 0476974

Banner Township is a township in Dickinson County, Kansas, United States. As of the 2020 census, its population was 75.

== History ==
Banner Township was organized in 1877.

== Geography ==
Banner Township covers an area of 35.7 square miles (92 km^{2}) and contains no incorporated settlements. According to the USGS, it contains two cemeteries: College Hill and Mount Calvary.

The streams of East Turkey Creek, Middle Branch and West Turkey Creek run through this township.
