= Hayes Township, Dickinson County, Kansas =

Hayes Township
- Township
- Location in Dickinson County
- Coordinates: 39°00′15″N 097°06′16″W
- Country: United States
- State: Kansas
- County: Dickinson

Area
  - Total: 30.03 sq mi (77.77 km^{2})
  - Land: 30.02 sq mi (77.74 km^{2})
  - Water: 0.012 sq mi (0.03 km^{2}) 0.04%
- Elevation: 1,240 ft (378 m)

Population (2020)
  - Total: 258
  - Density: 8.60/sq mi (3.32/km^{2})
- GNIS feature ID: 0476487

Hayes Township is a township in Dickinson County, Kansas, United States. As of the 2020 census, its population was 258.

== History ==
Hayes Township was organized in 1877.

== Geography ==
Hayes Township covers an area of 30.03 square miles (77.8 km^{2}) and contains no incorporated settlements.
