= Parkerville, Kansas =

City in Morris County, Kansas

- City
- Location within Morris County and Kansas

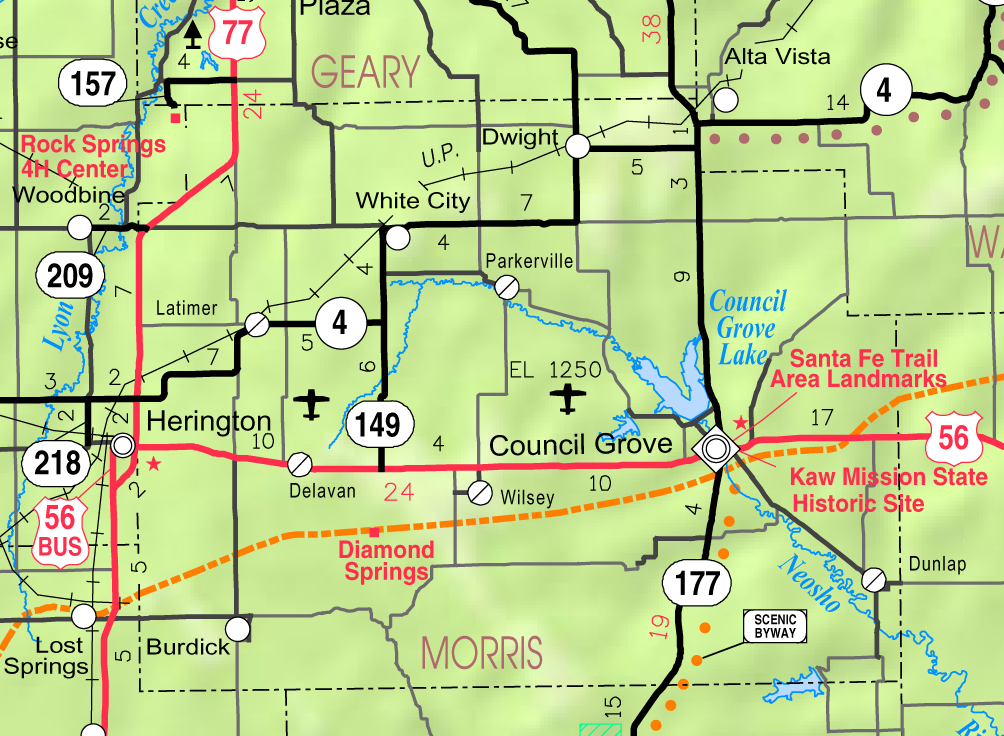
- KDOT map of Morris County (legend)
- Coordinates: 38°45′53″N 96°39′45″W
- Country: United States
- State: Kansas
- County: Morris
- Incorporated: 1871
- Named for: Charles Parker

Government
  - Type: Mayor–Council

Area
  - Total: 0.13 sq mi (0.33 km^{2})
  - Land: 0.13 sq mi (0.33 km^{2})
  - Water: 0 sq mi (0.00 km^{2})
- Elevation: 1,352 ft (412 m)

Population (2020)
  - Total: 46
  - Density: 360/sq mi (140/km^{2})
- Time zone: UTC-6 (CST)
  - Summer (DST): UTC-5 (CDT)
- Area code: 785
- FIPS code: 20-54575
- GNIS ID: 476886

Parkerville is a city in Morris County, Kansas, United States. As of the 2020 census, the population of the city was 46.

== History ==
A post office was established in Parkersville on August 9, 1870, then renamed to Parkerville on June 23, 1892. The post office closed on October 31, 1953. The city was incorporated as Parkerville in 1871. Parkerville was named for Charles G. Parker, a pioneer settler.

== Geography ==
Parkerville is located at 38°45′53″N 96°39′45″W (38.764622, -96.662441). According to the United States Census Bureau, the city has a total area of 0.12 square miles (0.31 km^{2}), all land.

== Demographics ==
Historical population
Census	Pop.	Note	%±
1890	202		—
1900	146		−27.7%
1910	157		7.5%
1920	144		−8.3%
1930	127		−11.8%
1940	105		−17.3%
1950	78		−25.7%
1960	59		−24.4%
1970	25		−57.6%
1980	42		68.0%
1990	28		−33.3%
2000	73		160.7%
2010	59		−19.2%
2020	46		−22.0%
U.S. Decennial Census

=== 2010 census ===
As of the census of 2010, there were 59 people, 25 households, and 17 families residing in the city. The population density was 491.7 inhabitants per square mile (189.8/km^{2}). There were 32 housing units at an average density of 266.7 per square mile (103.0/km^{2}). The racial makeup of the city was 81.4% White, 13.6% from other races, and 5.1% from two or more races. Hispanic or Latino of any race were 13.6% of the population.

There were 25 households, of which 32.0% had children under the age of 18 living with them, 52.0% were married couples living together, 8.0% had a female householder with no husband present, 8.0% had a male householder with no wife present, and 32.0% were non-families. 24.0% of all households were made up of individuals, and 4% had someone living alone who was 65 years of age or older. The average household size was 2.36 and the average family size was 2.82.

The median age in the city was 34.3 years. 22% of residents were under the age of 18; 8.6% were between the ages of 18 and 24; 37.4% were from 25 to 44; 20.4% were from 45 to 64; and 11.9% were 65 years of age or older. The gender makeup of the city was 50.8% male and 49.2% female.

=== 2000 census ===
As of the census of 2000, there were 73 people, 22 households, and 17 families residing in the city. The population density was 602.0 inhabitants per square mile (232.4/km^{2}). There were 32 housing units at an average density of 263.9 per square mile (101.9/km^{2}). The racial makeup of the city was 98.63% White, 1.37% from other races. Hispanic or Hispanic of any race were 6.85% of the population.

There were 22 households, out of which 50.0% had children under the age of 18 living with them, 72.7% were married couples living together, 14.5% had a female householder with no husband present, and 22.7% were non-families. 18.2% of all households were made up of individuals, and none had someone living alone who was 65 years of age or older. The average household size was 3.32 and the average family size was 3.94.

In the city, the population was spread out, with 42.5% under the age of 18, 5.5% from 18 to 24, 23.3% from 25 to 44, 17.8% from 45 to 64, and 11.0% who were 65 years of age or older. The median age was 26 years. For every 100 females, there were 121.2 males. For every 100 females age 18 and over, there were 110.0 males.

The median income for a household in the city was $29,375, and the median income for a family was $32,188. Males had a median income of $17,292 versus $0 for females. The per capita income for the city was $9,792. None of the population and none of the families were below the poverty line.

== Education ==
The community is served by Rural Vista USD 481 public school district.
