= Chapman USD 473 =

Public school district in Kansas, US

Address
- 822 N. Marshall St. Chapman, Kansas, 67431; United States
- Coordinates: 38.9748°N 97.0171°W

District information
- Type: Public
- Grades: K to 12
- Schools: 6

Other information
- Website: usd473.net

Chapman USD 473 is a public unified school district headquartered in Chapman, Kansas, United States. The district includes the communities of Chapman, Acme, Carlton, Detroit, Enterprise, Industry (south of 1st Rd), Lyona, Manchester, Navarre, Pearl, Wreford, Buckeye, Elmo, Holland, Moonlight, Upland, Sutphen, and nearby rural areas.

== Schools ==
The school district operates the following schools:

- Chapman High School in Chapman
- Chapman Middle School in Chapman
- Chapman Elementary in Chapman
- Blue Ridge Elementary is located northwest of Chapman in a rural area along K-18 Highway
- Enterprise Elementary in Enterprise
- Rural Center Elementary is located south of Abilene in a rural area along K-15 Highway

== See also ==
- Kansas State Department of Education
- Kansas State High School Activities Association
- List of high schools in Kansas
- List of unified school districts in Kansas
