= Hope, Kansas =

City in Dickinson County, Kansas

- City
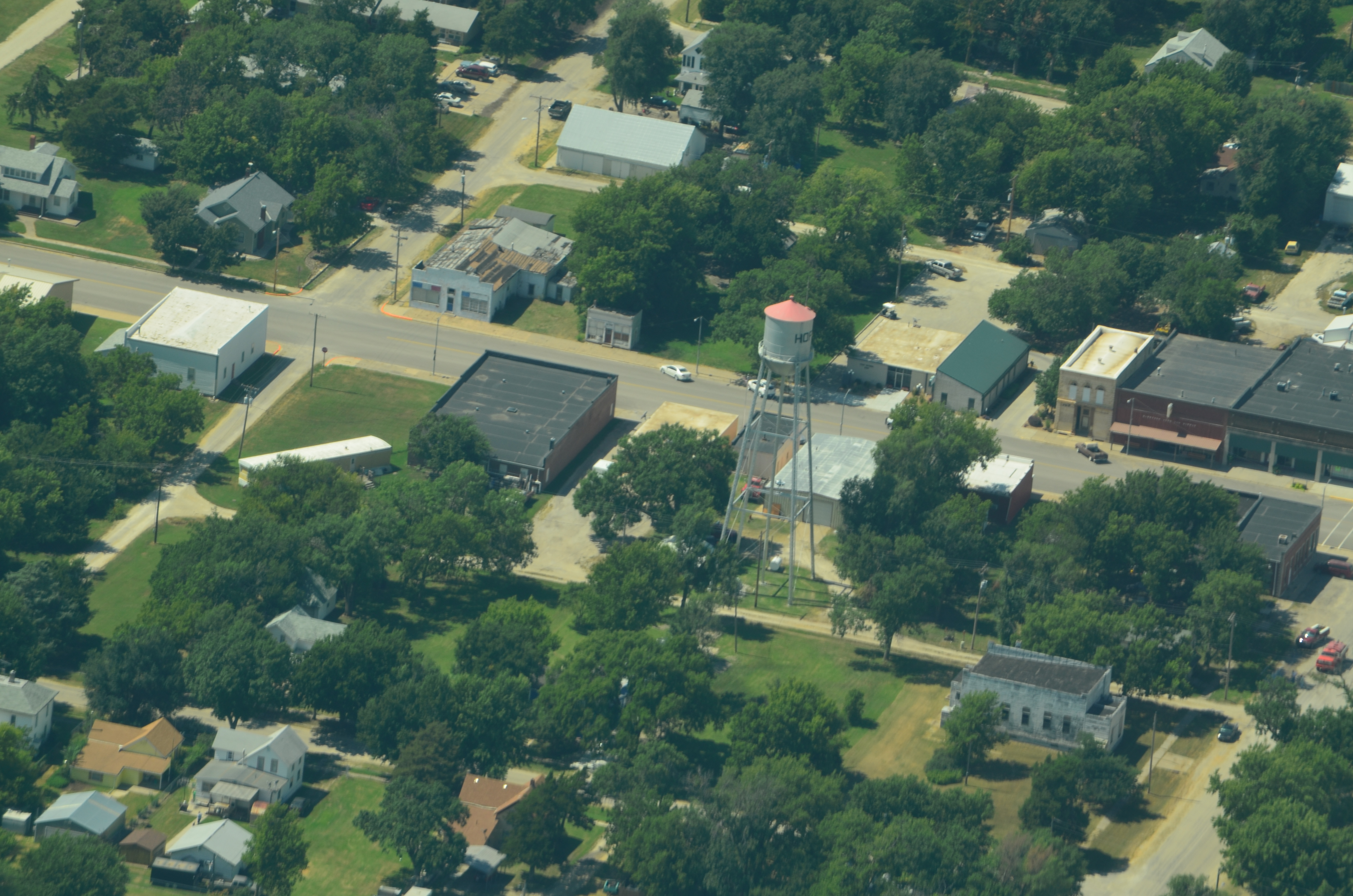
- Aerial photo of Hope (2013)

- Location within Dickinson County and Kansas

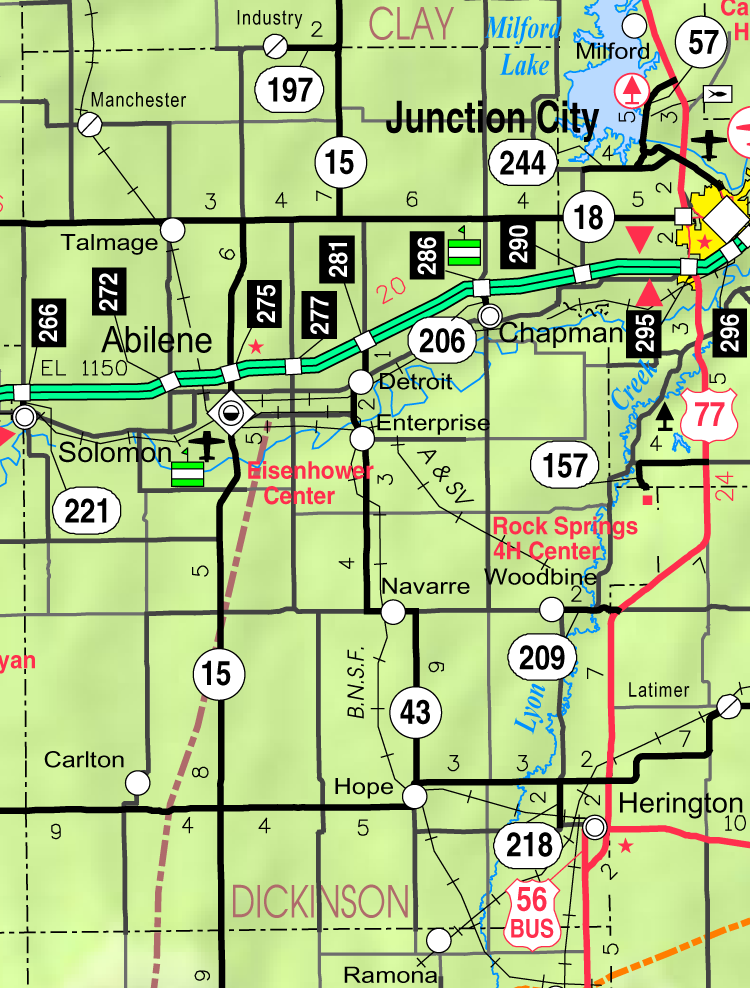
- KDOT map of Dickinson County (legend)
- Coordinates: 38°41′28″N 97°04′35″W
- Country: United States
- State: Kansas
- County: Dickinson
- Founded: 1871
- Incorporated: 1886

Government
  - Type: Mayor–Council
  - Mayor: Larry Ryff

Area
  - Total: 0.39 sq mi (1.01 km^{2})
  - Land: 0.39 sq mi (1.01 km^{2})
  - Water: 0 sq mi (0.00 km^{2})
- Elevation: 1,398 ft (426 m)

Population (2020)
  - Total: 317
  - Density: 813/sq mi (314/km^{2})
- Time zone: UTC-6 (CST)
  - Summer (DST): UTC-5 (CDT)
- ZIP Code: 67451
- Area code: 785
- FIPS code: 20-33075
- GNIS ID: 2394416
- Website: cityofhopeks.com

Hope is a city in southern Dickinson County, Kansas, United States. As of the 2020 census, the population of the city was 317.

== History ==
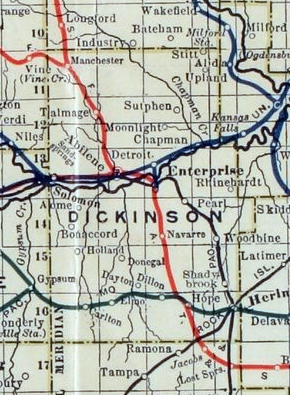
1915 railroad map of Dickinson County

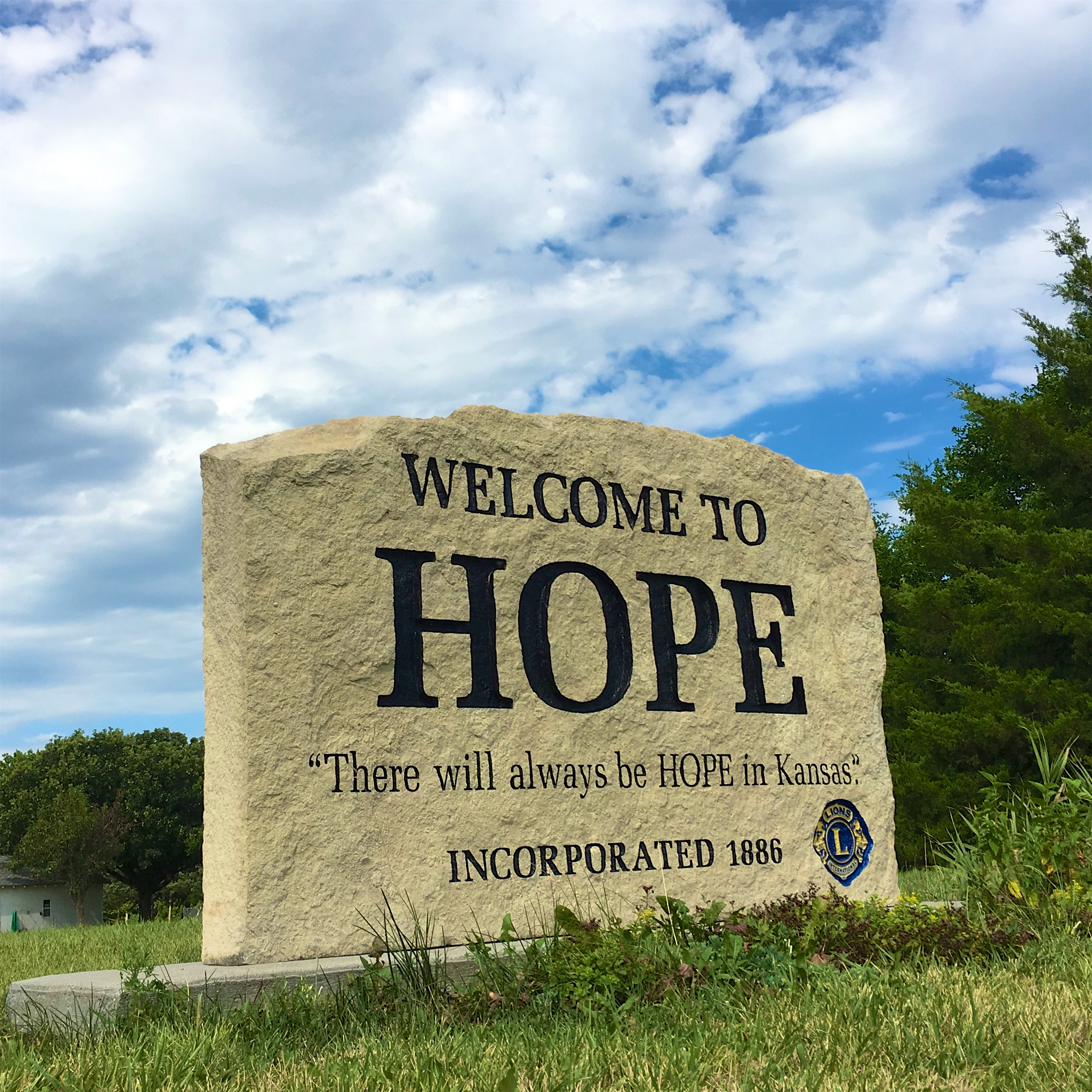
Limestone welcome banner in Hope (2017)

=== Early history ===
For many millennia, the Great Plains of North America was inhabited by nomadic Native Americans. From the 16th century to 18th century, the Kingdom of France claimed ownership of large parts of North America. In 1762, after the French and Indian War, France secretly ceded New France to Spain, per the Treaty of Fontainebleau.

In 1802, Spain returned most of the land to France. In 1803, most of the land that became the state of Kansas was acquired by the United States from France as part of the 828,000 square mile Louisiana Purchase for 2.83 cents per acre.

In 1854, the Kansas Territory was organized, then in 1861 Kansas became the 34th U.S. state. In 1857, Dickinson County was established within the Kansas Territory, which included what became Hope.

=== Development ===
In 1871, a group of about forty people, led by Newell Thurstin, began planning a townsite, named Hope after one of his sons. Its first post office was established in July 1871.

David Jacob Eisenhower, the father of President Dwight David Eisenhower, lived in a 160-acre (0.65 km^{2}) ranch near Hope from 1878 until his enrollment at Lane University in Lecompton, and then he moved to Hope. On March 30, 1885, he and business partner Milton Good opened a general store in Hope called Good & Eisenhower, operated mostly by the Eisenhower family, and "balanced to the penny" by Eisenhower's mandate. The partners were leading civic boosters for Hope for years, with the community development mostly led by Good and the socially reclusive Eisenhower co-funding some projects.

Hope was incorporated in 1886, with a population over 700. The arrival of the railroad one year before, brought access of bustling Chicago to tiny Hope. In early 1886, Eisenhower and Good organized a fundraiser among businesses to open an opera house in Hope. On November 4, 1886, Eisenhower bought out their partnership of one and a half years.

In 1887, Atchison, Topeka and Santa Fe Railway built a branch line from Neva (3 miles west of Strong City) through Hope to Superior, Nebraska. In 1996, the Atchison, Topeka and Santa Fe Railway merged with Burlington Northern Railroad and renamed to the current BNSF Railway.

In late 1888, Good abandoned Hope, and the Eisenhower family continued the store. The Eisenhowers reported Good's "misdeeds" to have caused the later failure of the store and his departure to have been "in something of a hurry", but historians' research has improved Good's retrospective reputation.

The motto of Hope is "There Will Always Be Hope In Kansas", which is also the name of a song.

== Geography ==
The United States Census Bureau reports a total area of 0.39 square miles (1.01 km^{2}), all land.

=== Climate ===
The climate has hot, humid summers and generally mild to cool winters. According to the Köppen Climate Classification system, Hope has a humid subtropical climate, abbreviated "Cfa" on climate maps.

== Demographics ==
Historical population
Census	Pop.	Note	%±
1890	632		—
1900	557		−11.9%
1910	567		1.8%
1920	589		3.9%
1930	556		−5.6%
1940	500		−10.1%
1950	480		−4.0%
1960	463		−3.5%
1970	438		−5.4%
1980	468		6.8%
1990	404		−13.7%
2000	372		−7.9%
2010	368		−1.1%
2020	317		−13.9%
U.S. Decennial Census

=== 2020 census ===
The 2020 United States census counted 317 people, 146 households, and 82 families in Hope. The population density was 814.9 per square mile (314.6/km^{2}). There were 175 housing units at an average density of 449.9 per square mile (173.7/km^{2}). The racial makeup was 92.74% (294) white or European American (91.8% non-Hispanic white), 0.32% (1) black or African-American, 0.63% (2) Native American or Alaska Native, 0.32% (1) Asian, 0.0% (0) Pacific Islander or Native Hawaiian, 1.26% (4) from other races, and 4.73% (15) from two or more races. Hispanic or Latino of any race was 2.52% (8) of the population.

Of the 146 households, 22.6% had children under the age of 18; 46.6% were married couples living together; 24.0% had a female householder with no spouse or partner present. 41.1% of households consisted of individuals and 18.5% had someone living alone who was 65 years of age or older. The average household size was 2.5 and the average family size was 3.7. The percent of those with a bachelor's degree or higher was estimated to be 13.9% of the population.

21.8% of the population was under the age of 18, 4.4% from 18 to 24, 18.3% from 25 to 44, 28.1% from 45 to 64, and 27.4% who were 65 years of age or older. The median age was 51.5 years. For every 100 females, there were 112.8 males. For every 100 females ages 18 and older, there were 103.3 males.

The 2016–2020 5-year American Community Survey estimates show that the median household income was $40,833 (with a margin of error of +/- $11,846) and the median family income was $63,750 (+/- $13,471). Males had a median income of $34,306 (+/- $5,297) versus $29,375 (+/- $28,309) for females. The median income for those above 16 years old was $34,028 (+/- $5,808). Approximately, 18.9% of families and 27.3% of the population were below the poverty line, including 36.9% of those under the age of 18 and 3.2% of those ages 65 or over.

=== 2010 census ===
The census of 2010 reports 368 people, 166 households, and 104 families residing in the city. The population density was 943.6 inhabitants per square mile (364.3/km^{2}). There were 192 housing units at an average density of 492.3 per square mile (190.1/km^{2}). The racial makeup of the city was 93.5% White, 2.4% African American, 0.8% Native American, 0.3% Asian, and 3.0% from two or more races. Hispanic or Latino of any race were 0.3% of the population.

There were 166 households, of which 22.9% had children under the age of 18 living with them, 54.2% were married couples living together, 6.0% had a female householder with no husband present, 2.4% had a male householder with no wife present, and 37.3% were non-families. 33.7% of all households were made up of individuals, and 18.7% had someone living alone who was 65 years of age or older. The average household size was 2.22 and the average family size was 2.81.

The median age in the city was 48.7 years. 19.8% of residents were under the age of 18; 6.9% were between the ages of 18 and 24; 16.3% were from 25 to 44; 34% were from 45 to 64; and 23.1% were 65 years of age or older. The gender makeup of the city was 49.7% male and 50.3% female.

=== 2000 census ===
The census of 2000 reports 372 people, 164 households, and 106 families residing in the city. The population density was 821.8 inhabitants per square mile (317.3/km^{2}). There were 185 housing units at an average density of 408.7 per square mile (157.8/km^{2}). The racial makeup of the city was 98.12% White, 0.81% African American, 0.54% Native American, 0.27% Asian, and 0.27% from two or more races. Hispanic or Latino of any race were 0.27% of the population.

There were 164 households, out of which 29.9% had children under the age of 18 living with them, 57.3% were married couples living together, 5.5% had a female householder with no husband present, and 34.8% were non-families. 32.9% of all households were made up of individuals, and 21.3% had someone living alone who was 65 years of age or older. The average household size was 2.27 and the average family size was 2.88.

In the city, the population was spread out, with 24.5% under the age of 18, 3.8% from 18 to 24, 25.3% from 25 to 44, 24.2% from 45 to 64, and 22.3% who were 65 years of age or older. The median age was 43 years. For every 100 females, there were 84.2 males. For every 100 females age 18 and over, there were 82.5 males.

The median income for a household in the city was $28,365, and the median income for a family was $32,813. Males had a median income of $27,639 versus $18,036 for females. The per capita income for the city was $14,300. About 4.8% of families and 7.4% of the population were below the poverty line, including 4.6% of those under age 18 and 14.0% of those age 65 or over.

== Government ==
The Hope government consists of a mayor and five council members.

The community is served by Rural Vista USD 481 public school district.

== Transportation ==
Hope is located on K-4, the longest highway in the state. It was once at the junction of the BNSF and Missouri Pacific railroads, but is no longer served by either Railroad.

== Notable people ==
- Edgar Eisenhower, brother of President Dwight D. Eisenhower, was born in Hope, Kansas.
- Don Ihde, philosopher, was born in Hope, Kansas, in 1934.

== See also ==
- Hope Township, Dickinson County, Kansas
