= 2010 Kansas Collegiate Athletic Conference football season =

- League: NAIA
- Sport: football
- Duration: August 28, 2010 through November 13, 2010
- Teams: 10

Regular season
- Conference champions: McPherson
- Runners-up: Ottawa
- Season MVP: Shane Mascarenas

Football seasons
- 2009 2011

2010 Kansas Collegiate Athletic Conference football standings
	Conf.			Overall
Team	W		L	W		L
No. 11 McPherson $^	9	–	0	10	–	1
No. 13 Ottawa ^	8	–	1	9	–	2
No. 22 Kansas Wesleyan	6	–	3	7	–	3
Sterling	6	–	3	7	–	3
Friends	5	–	4	6	–	4
Tabor	4	–	5	4	–	6
Bethany (KS)	3	–	6	4	–	6
Saint Mary (KS)	2	–	7	2	–	8
Southwestern (KS)	2	–	7	2	–	8
Bethel (KS)	0	–	9	0	–	10
$ – Conference champion; ^ – NAIA playoff participant; Rankings from NAIA Coaches' Poll

The 2010 Kansas Collegiate Athletic Conference football season is made up of 10 college athletic programs that compete in the Kansas Collegiate Athletic Conference (KCAC) under the National Association of Intercollegiate Athletics (NAIA) for the 2010 college football season. The season began on August 28, 2010, at 7:00 pm when the Ottawa University Braves challenged state-rival Baker University in the College Fanz First Down Classic game.

After conclusion of a successful 10-game season on November 13, conference champions McPherson and runner-up Ottawa were seeded to compete in the 2010 NAIA Football National Championship. Both teams were eliminated from the tournament in the first round.

== Conference teams and information ==
Conference rules require each team to play all other teams within the conference and one other regular season non-conference game for a total of 10 games (beginning in 2011, the conference will allow schools to play 11 games).

School	Mascot	Head coach	Location	Stadium	Rankings		
School	Mascot	Head coach	Location	Stadium	Preseason April 19, 2010	End of Season November 14, 2010	Postseason January 10, 2011
Bethany	Terrible Swedes	Jamie Cruce	Lindsborg, Kansas	Lindstrom Field			
Bethel	Threshers	Travis Graber	North Newton, Kansas	Thresher Stadium			
Friends	Falcons	Monty Lewis	Wichita, Kansas	Adair-Austin Stadium	#15		
Kansas Wesleyan	Coyotes	Dave Dallas	Salina, Kansas	Salina Stadium		#21	#22
McPherson	Bulldogs	Joe Bettasso	McPherson, Kansas	McPherson Stadium	#12	#6	#11
Ottawa	Braves	Kent Kessinger	Ottawa, Kansas	Peoples Bank Field	#8	#8	#13
Saint Mary	Spires	Lance Hinson	Leavenworth, Kansas	Saint Mary Field			
Southwestern	Moundbuilders	Ken Crandall	Winfield, Kansas	Richard L. Jantz Stadium			
Sterling	Warriors	Andy Lambert	Sterling, Kansas	Smisor Stadium			
Tabor	Bluejays	Mike Gardner	Hillsboro, Kansas	Joel Wiens Stadium			

== Preseason outlook ==
Ottawa was declared the 2009 KCAC Champions with an undefeated regular season record. The 2010 season begins with three teams nationally ranked in the NAIA: Ottawa (8th), McPherson (12th), and Friends (15th).

=== Bethany ===
Bethany is coming off a 4–6 season and finished the spring practices looking to fill key offensive positions at the quarterback and running back positions in an effort to "ramp up a running game that basically was non-existent the second half of the season." In week 4, Bethany plays outside of the NAIA against NCAA Division III team MacMurray College.

=== Bethel ===
First-year coach Travis Graber takes over a team that completed the season with 3 wins and 7 losses. Graber was the team's Defensive Coordinator in 2009 and was promoted to the job after head coach Mike Moore resigned.

=== Friends ===
Friends University begins 2010 with long-time coach Monty Lewis. The program ended 2009 with 8 wins and 2 losses and a third-place finish in the conference. Seven defensive starters return from the previous year that ranked second in rushing defense (50.8 yapg) and total defense (220.5 yapg) in the NAIA.

=== Kansas Wesleyan ===
Head coach Dave Dallas begins the season bringing in 21 freshman recruits and 3 additional Junior College transfers.

=== McPherson ===
McPherson completed the 2009-year with a record of 9 wins and 2 losses (8–1 in conference play) with a second-place finish in the conference and post-season playoff appearance for the first time. Returning players include Aaron Laffite who was first in the country last year in scoring per game (12.7).

=== Ottawa ===
The Ottawa University Braves return as the prior year's conference champion with thirteen of the previous year's starters. In 2009 the team lost their only game in the second round of the NAIA playoffs and begins ranked No. 8 nationally in the pre-season poll. They completed a record of 11–1. Wide receiver Clarence Anderson was named to the Sporting News Preseason NAIA All-American Team for 2010 and head coach Kent Kessinger is in his seventh year at the program.

=== Saint Mary ===
Saint Mary's disappointing 3–7 record in 2009 ended with a win. Head Coach Lance Hinson returns for his sixth season.

=== Southwestern ===
Ken Crandall begins the season for the Moundbuilders with a new stadium as Sonner Stadium is being renovated. The "Builders" have lost 13 straight road games dating back to 2007.

=== Sterling ===
Sterling comes off the 2009 season with a fourth-place finish in the conference and a 6–4 record.

=== Tabor ===
The Tabor Bluejays football team play their home games in Joel Wiens Stadium located in Hillsboro, Kansas. Tabor's previous year produced a winless 0–10 season. The head coach for the 2010 season is Mike Gardner. 2010 marks Gardner's return to Tabor from the Malone Pioneers in Canton, Ohio. Gardner coached the Bluejays for the 2004 and 2005 seasons. In his previous tenure at the program, Gardner led the Bluejays to back-to-back conference championships and was nationally ranked both years.

== Schedule ==
Index to colors and formatting
KCAC member won
KCAC member lost
Winning team in **bold**

=== Week 0 ===
NAIA football typically plays bowl games in the pre-season as a regular season game. This tradition began with the now defunct Wheat Bowl and has continued with the College Fanz First Down Classic.

Date	Time	Visiting team	Home team	Site	TV	Result	Attendance	Ref.
August 28, 2010	7:00 pm	No. 24 Baker	No. 8 **Ottawa**	Peoples Bank Field • Ottawa, Kansas (College Fanz First Down Classic)	Victory Sports Network	**W** 15–24	-	
^{#}Rankings from NAIA Coaches' Poll. All times are in Central Time.

==== #24 Baker at No. 8 Ottawa (College Fanz First Down Classic) ====
	1	2	3	4	Total
#24 Baker	0	0	0	14	**14**
**#8 Ottawa**	7	0	7	10	**24**

The start of the 2010 NAIA football season began at People's Bank Field in Ottawa, Kansas for the College Fanz First Down Classic game between two nationally ranked teams: No. 8 Ottawa and No. 24 Baker. This game marked the first time the two schools met in football for 17 years. Ottawa began the game by returning the kickoff for a touchdown and let the entire game to a 24–14 victory.

Offensively the teams were closely matched statistically: Ottawa produced 375 yards of total offense to Baker's 408; Baker managed to record 19 first downs while Ottawa achieved 20; third down conversions were 5–16 for Baker, 9–23 for Ottawa. Statistically, the major marked difference was in penalties: Baker had 16 penalties and gave up 144 yards, where Ottawa had a mere 4 penalties that gave up 28 yards.

=== Week 1 ===
Date	Time	Visiting team	Home team	Site	TV	Result	Attendance	Ref.
September 4, 2010	6:00 pm	Saint Mary	**Southern Nazarene**	McFarland Park Stadium • Bethany, Oklahoma	MOKSsports.com	**L** 17–63	-	
September 4, 2010	7:00 pm	Haskell	No. 12 **McPherson**	McPherson Stadium • McPherson, Kansas	Victory Sports Network	**W** 0–45	-	
September 4, 2010	7:00 pm	**Panhandle State**	Southwestern	Richard L. Jantz Stadium • Winfield, Kansas	Victory Sports Network	**L** 32–27	-	
^{#}Rankings from NAIA Coaches' Poll. All times are in Central Time.

==== Saint Mary at Southern Nazarene ====
	1	2	3	4	Total
Saint Mary	0	0	7	10	**17**
**Southern Nazarene**	13	36	7	7	**63**

Southern Nazarene set a school record with 556 total yards, 418 of which were passing. The final score was 63–17, with 36 points scored in the second quarter alone.

Southern Nazarene had lost the week prior to Eastern New Mexico by a score of 21–59, placing Southern Nazarene to a record of 1–1. Saint Mary's record for the season was 0–1, as this was the season opener.

==== Haskell at No. 12 McPherson ====
	1	2	3	4	Total
Haskell	0	0	0	0	**0**
**#12 McPHerson**	21	14	10	0	**45**

The twelfth-ranked McPherson Bulldogs held Haskell scoreless for the entire game. Haskell was able to achieve 8 first downs for the game, compared to McPherson's 25. Haskell's total offense was only 142 yards, where McPherson achieved 407 total yards. Haskell was 1–14 on third down conversions, where McPHerson was 5–12.

The final score of Haskell 0/McPherson 45 put Haskell's record to 0–2 and McPherson to 1–0.

==== Panhandle State at Southwestern ====
	1	2	3	4	Total
**Panhandle State**	14	0	18	0	**32**
Southwestern	13	7	7	0	**27**

Southwestern opened the season in newly renovated Richard L. Jantz Stadium against NCAA Division II Panhandle State. Panhandle State ended the game with negative punting yards (−43) from a single punt, but managed 14–21 on third down conversions, where Southwestern was 0–8 on third down. Panhandle State achieved exactly 500 yards in total offense compared to Southwestern's 279. The final score of 32–27 put Panhandle State to 1–1 for the season and Southwestern to 0–1.

=== Week 2 ===
Date	Time	Visiting team	Home team	Site	TV	Result	Attendance	Ref.
September 11, 2010	2:30 pm	**Bethany**	Saint Mary	Saint Mary Field • Leavenworth, Kansas	Victory Sports Network	51–27	-	
September 11, 2010	6:00 pm	Southwestern	**Sterling**	Smisor Stadium • Sterling, Kansas	Victory Sports Network	17–28	-	
September 11, 2010	7:00 pm	No. 9 **Ottawa**	Bethel	Thresher Stadium • North Newton, Kansas	Victory Sports Network	62–23	-	
September 11, 2010	7:00 pm	No. 12 **McPherson**	Friends	Adair-Austin Stadium • Wichita, Kansas	Victory Sports Network	52–20	-	
September 11, 2010	7:00 pm	**Kansas Wesleyan**	Tabor	Joel Wiens Stadium • Hillsboro, Kansas	Victory Sports Network	23–20	-	
^{#}Rankings from NAIA Coaches' Poll. All times are in Central Time.

==== Bethany at Saint Mary ====
	1	2	3	4	Total
**Bethany**	9	7	21	14	**51**
Saint Mary	7	7	0	13	**27**

The Bethany Terrible Swedes scored 21 points in the third quarter against Saint Mary in their 51–27 victory. Their first score came on a 30-yard field goal. Later in the first quarter, Saint Mary came up with a 19-yard pass for a touchdown to take the lead by a score of 3–7. Still in the first quarter, Bethany returned a kick for a touchdown to take the lead 9–7 (the extra point attempt was blocked).

In the second quarter, Saint Mary took the lead again by scoring a touchdown to bring the score to 14–9. Bethany answered with two back-to-back touchdowns, which left the score 23–14 and led for the remainder of the game. Saint Mary would score two more touchdowns and produce 420 yards of total offense, but it would not be enough to overcome Bethany's seven touchdowns.

==== Southwestern at Sterling ====
	1	2	3	4	Total
Southwestern	0	3	7	7	**17**
**Sterling**	7	14	0	7	**28**

Sterling College gave up 4 fumbles and 1 interception, but still managed to record a 28–17 victory over Southwestern. Sterling's Rashard Colquit scored a touchdown on a 35-yard run in the first quarter and maintained the lead for the remainder of the game.

Southwestern produced 319 yards in total offense to Sterlings 291. Southwestern also managed 2–4 on fourth down conversions, and 5–19 on third down conversions. After the game, Southwestern dropped to a record of 0–2 (0–1 KCAC) and Sterling was 1–0 (1–0 KCAC).

==== #9 Ottawa at Bethel ====
	1	2	3	4	Total
**#9 Ottawa**	20	7	35	0	**62**
Bethel	0	0	16	7	**23**

The Ottawa Braves took a national ranking of No. 9 and traveled to play Bethel College. The visiting team handled the Threshers with a final score of 62–23. Ottawa scored three touchdowns in the first quarter and seven in the third quarter. Two of the touchdowns in the third period were kick returns for a touchdown, another was a 100-yard interception return.

Bethel did not score until the third quarter, when they recorded two touchdowns. Bethel later scored the last touchdown of the game in the fourth quarter when Jason Vail succeeded with a 5-yard run.

Both teams managed over 300 yards of total offense, most of it passing. Ottawa recorded 302 yards passing and Bethel ended at 299 yards passing.

==== #12 McPherson at Friends ====
	1	2	3	4	Total
**#12 McPherson**	14	28	10	0	**52**
Friends	0	6	0	14	**20**

Nationally ranked McPherson College traveled to Friends University and delivered a victory by a score of 52–20. In the first period, Andy Skinner caught a 76-yard pass from quarterback Shane Mascarenas. Travis Eason completed the conversion with a successful kick and McPherson led 7–0, and held the lead for the remainder of the game.

McPherson produced 501 yards of total offense and averaged 8.9 yards per play. They scored a total of 7 touchdowns (3 rushing, 4 passing) and punted once for 28 yards. Friends managed to build only 244 yards of total offense for 3.2 yards per play and punted six times for a total of 224 yards. Friends did successfully complete 2 of 3 fourth-down conversions but gave up 3 interceptions on 43 attempts.

==== Kansas Wesleyan at Tabor ====
	1	2	3	4	Total
**Kansas Wesleyan**	7	6	7	3	**23**
Tabor	6	0	0	14	**20**

Tabor College took the lead with a Sean Rothwell 19-yard field goal in the first quarter, but it would be the only time the team would have the lead for the rest of the game. On the next play, Kansas wesleyan's Horace Carter returned the kickoff for 77 yards to take the lead 7–3. Kansas Wesleyan maintained the lead for the remainder of the game that concluded in a score of 23 to 20.

Both teams managed over 300 yards of total offense and each scored 2 touchdowns. The game marked the return of Tabor head coach Mike Gardner and put Tabor to 0–1 for the season while Kansas Wesleyan became 1–0.

=== Week 3 ===
Date	Time	Visiting team	Home team	Site	TV	Result	Attendance	Ref.
September 18, 2010	1:00 pm	Peru State	**Sterling**	Smisor Stadium • Sterling, Kansas	Victory Sports Network	**W** 10–17	-	
September 18, 2010	2:00 pm	Saint Mary	**Kansas Wesleyan**	Salina Stadium • Salina, Kansas	Victory Sports Network	17–59	-	
September 18, 2010	7:00 pm	**Tabor**	Bethany	Lindstrom Field • Lindsborg, Kansas	Victory Sports Network	34–13	-	
September 18, 2010	7:00 pm	No. 7 Ottawa	No. 9 **McPherson**	McPherson Stadium • McPherson, Kansas	Victory Sports Network	24–56	-	
September 18, 2010	7:00 pm	**Friends**	Southwestern	Richard L. Jantz Stadium • Winfield, Kansas	Victory Sports Network	20–17	-	
September 18, 2010	7:00 pm	**Southern Nazarene**	Bethel	Thresher Stadium • North Newton, Kansas	Victory Sports Network	**L** 42–18	-	
^{#}Rankings from NAIA Coaches' Poll. All times are in Central Time.

==== Peru State vs Sterling ====
	1	2	3	4	Total
Peru State	0	7	3	0	**10**
**Sterling**	0	3	7	7	**17**

After a scoreless first quarter, Doug Dunn of Sterling kicked a 17-yard field goal help his team take the lead 3–0. Peru State answered with two consecutive scores in the second and third to pull ahead 10–3. Sterling then tied with a 20-yard run by Levi Cockle and Dunn's extra point to set the score 10–10. The final touchdown in the 4th quarter by Sterling let the game 17–10.

The close score was matched by close statistics for the squads. Both teams produced under 250 yards of total offense. Peru State had 5 punts averaging 27 yards, where Sterling had six punts averaging 39 yards.

==== Saint Mary vs Kansas Wesleyan ====
	1	2	3	4	Total
Saint Mary	0	7	10	0	**17**
**Kansas Wesleyan**	21	24	7	7	**59**

Kansas Wesleyan scored three touchdowns in the first quarter and a toal of 45 points in the first half to defeat conference opponent Saint Mary by a final score of 17–59.

Kansas Wesleyan put down 537 yards of total offense in 81 plays, averaging 6.6 yards per play. 279 of those yards were rushing, the remaining 258 by passing. Three players for Kansas Wesleyan rushed for over 50 yards.

Saint Mary was 4–14 on third down conversions, where Kansas Wesleyan was 7–13 in the same category. Saint Mary was forced to punt six times for a total of 202 yards punting.

==== Tabor vs Bethany ====
	1	2	3	4	Total
**Tabor**	0	14	0	20	**34**
Bethay	7	3	3	0	**13**

The Bethany College Terrible Swedes started the game with a first-quarter touchdown by Anthony Pines with a 4-yard run. Tabor answered in the second quarter with a touchdown pass to tie the score. Alex Farmbrough kicked a 22-yard field goal to put Tabor up by three points and they held the lead for the rest of the game.

Both teams had over 70 plays on offense for over 400 total yards. Tabor led the third-down conversion battle by going 10–16, doubling Bethany's 5–16 result. Bethany also turned the ball over twice on fumbles and the final score was left at 34–13.

==== #7 Ottawa at No. 9 McPherson ====
	1	2	3	4	Total
#7 Ottawa	3	0	7	14	**24**
#9 McPherson	14	21	7	14	**56**

The Ninth-ranked McPherson College Bulldogs upset the seventh-ranked Ottawa University Braves by a score of 24–56. McPherson scored two consecutive touchdowns in the first quarter and led the remainder of the game.

McPherson's Aaron Lafitte rushed for 101 yards in 23 plays and scored 3 touchdowns and quarterback Shane Mascarenas threw 4 more. Ottawa managed 318 yards in total offense, but it was not enough to match McPherson's 618 total offensive yards. Ottawa punted 8 times for a total of 326 yards where McPherson only was forced to punt 3 times for a total of 107.

==== Friends at Southwestern ====
	1	2	3	4	Total
**Friends**	6	0	0	14	**20**
Southwestern	7	7	3	0	**17**

Former Southwestern college player and head coach Monty Lewis took his Friends Falcons to newly renovated Richard L. Jantz Stadium and left with a close 20–17 victory.

Southwestern began quickly with an opening touchdown 58 seconds into the game and held the lead until a last second pass found the end zone for Friends. Southwestern's penalties on the final drive of the game and the four-yard pass from Jayme Bristow to Josh Womack sealed the game with only 11 seconds left on the clock.

==== Southern Nazarene at Bethel ====
	1	2	3	4	Total
**Southern Nazarene**	7	21	14	0	**42**
Bethel	6	6	0	6	**18**

Southern Nazarene completed its second victory over a KCAC opponent with a 42–18 victory over Bethel College. The Crimson Storm took an early lead when Brady Wardlaw completed a 5-yard pass to Derick Perkins for a touchdown in the first quarter and they held the lead for the remainder of the game.

Southern Nazarene's six touchdowns all came by the air. Bethel threw for two touchdowns and had a bright spot when Taylor Morris completed a 99-yard punt return for a touchdown early in the fourth quarter.

=== Week 4 ===
Date	Time	Visiting team	Home team	Site	TV	Result	Attendance	Ref.
September 25, 2010	1:00 pm	**Bethany**	MacMurray	Freesen Field • Jacksonville, Illinois	Victory Sports Network	**W** 38–7	-	
September 25, 2010	1:30 pm	**Southwestern**	Saint Mary	Saint Mary Field • Leavenworth, Kansas	Victory Sports Network	43–21	-	
September 25, 2010	6:00 pm	No. 25 Sterling	No. 15 **Ottawa**	Peoples Bank Field • Ottawa, Kansas	Victory Sports Network	34–39	-	
September 25, 2010	7:00 pm	Bethel	**Kansas Wesleyan**	Salina Stadium • Salina, Kansas	Victory Sports Network	0–45	-	
September 25, 2010	7:00 pm	**Friends**	Tabor	Joel Wiens Stadium • Hillsboro, Kansas	Victory Sports Network	35–21	-	
^{#}Rankings from NAIA Coaches' Poll. All times are in Central Time.

==== Bethany vs MacMurray ====
	1	2	3	4	Total
**Bethany**	7	3	7	21	**38**
MacMurray	0	7	0	0	**7**

Bethany college took the lead early in the first quarter with a 1-yard run for a touchdown and led the remainder of the game. Bethany produced 556 yards of total offense with running back Theron Allen responsible for 175 of those yards rushing. Bethany's offense produced 21 first downs and was only forced to punt once, while MacMurray only generated 12 first downs and found themselves punting six times. Final score for the game was Bethany 38–MacMurray 7.

==== Southwestern vs Saint Mary ====
	1	2	3	4	Total
**Southwestern**	12	3	28	0	**43**
Saint Mary	0	0	14	0	**14**

Southwestern scored its first touchdown in the first minute of play and led the remainder of the game. Saint Mary scored three touchdowns in the second half but it was not enough to overcome the Moundbuilders lead.

Southwestern's offense put up 405 yards—101 more than Saint Mary's 304. Both teams passed for over 200 yards. Southwestern was 3–3 on 4th down conversion attempts and only punted 4 times to Saint Mary's 7 punts. Saint Mary managed to hold on to the ball when southwestern gave up two fumbles before the game ended with a final score of 43–21.

==== #25 Sterling vs No. 15 Ottawa ====
	1	2	3	4	Total
#25 Sterling	14	0	7	13	**34**
**#15 Ottawa**	7	17	6	9	**39**

Ottawa extended its home winning streak to 12 games with a victory over Sterling College. Ottawa was behind with under three minutes remaining but managed to score a touchdown in the final minutes to secure the win.

The lead changed four times in this close game between two nationally ranked teams. Both teams recorded over 300 yards of total offense and were 7–16 on third down conversions. Neither team gave up a fumble or an interception and total combined penalty yardage was under 100.

==== Bethel vs Kansas Wesleyan ====
	1	2	3	4	Total
Bethel	0	0	0	0	**0**
**Kansas Wesleyan**	24	14	0	7	**45**

Kansas Wesleyan (KW) traveled down Interstate 135 and soundly defeated Bethel by a score of 45 to 0. KW started with 24 points in the first quarter and racked up a total of 492 yards of offense while holding Bethel to 65. Bethel was forced to punt 7 times and averaged just over 24 yards for each attempt.

KW continued the statistical power by successfully completing 8 out of 18 third down attempts and 4 of 5 fourth-down attempts. Bethel's bright spots was that they completed zero fumbles for the game (although they did give up one interception) and committed only 2 penalties for 20 yards.

==== Friends vs Tabor ====
	1	2	3	4	Total
**Friends**	0	7	13	15	**35**
Tabor	0	7	0	14	**21**

Tabor took the field at Joel Wiens Stadium against Friends and held a close game in the first half, even taking a 7–0 lead with a 4-yard pass in the second quarter. Inside of two minutes later, Friends answered with a touchdown of their own to tie the game 7–7.

Friends took control of the game in the second half by scoring three additional touchdowns to put the game out of reach for the Bluejays. Both teams generated over 400 yards of total offense with Friends averaging 7.1 yards per play and Tabor averaging 5.3. Friends running back Jeran Trotter rushed for 240 yards while Tabor's quarterback Joey Erickson passed for 409 yards. When the game ended, Friends was on top 35–21.

=== Week 5 ===
Date	Time	Visiting team	Home team	Site	TV	Result	Attendance	Ref.
October 2, 2010	1:30 pm	No. 7 **McPherson**	Sterling	McPherson Stadium • McPherson, Kansas	Victory Sports Network	30–21	-	
October 2, 2010	1:30 pm	No. 13 **Ottawa**	Southwestern	Richard L. Jantz Stadium • Winfield, Kansas	Victory Sports Network	51–0	-	
October 2, 2010	2:00 pm	Tabor	**Peru State**	Oak Bowl • Peru, Nebraska	Victory Sports Network	**L** 45–48	-	
October 2, 2010	7:00 pm	No. 22 **Kansas Wesleyan**	Bethany	Lindstrom Field • Lindsborg, Kansas	Victory Sports Network	66–49	-	
October 2, 2010	7:00 pm	Bethel	**Friends**	Adair-Austin Stadium • Wichita, Kansas	Victory Sports Network	12–43	-	
^{#}Rankings from NAIA Coaches' Poll. All times are in Central Time.

==== #7 McPherson vs Sterling ====
	1	2	3	4	Total
**#7 McPherson**	0	17	7	7	**31**
Sterling	0	0	7	14	**21**

The game started with a scoreless first quarter but the second quarter was filled with two touchdowns and a field goal by McPherson to take a 17–0 lead at the half. McPherson held the lead for the remainder of the game that ended in a score of 31–21.

McPherson's 523 yards of total offense helped them to achieve 31 first downs and succeed at 8 out 15 third down conversions. Sterling's offense produced 196 yards, 17 first downs, and was 1–11 on third down conversions—forcing them to punt six times for an average of 38.5 yards per punt.

==== #13 Ottawa vs Southwestern ====
	1	2	3	4	Total
**#13 Ottawa**	24	0	7	20	**51**
Southwestern	0	0	0	0	**0**

The No. 13 Ottawa University Braves racked up 550 yards of total offense in a 51–0 thrashing of the Southwestern Moundbuilders. Southwestern gave up four interceptions in the game and punted a total of 9 times.

Ottawa Quarterback Bobby Adamson had his best passing performance to date with 259 yards on 29 attempts and 17 completions for three touchdowns, averaging over 15 yards per completion. Running Back Michael Baer added on 170 rushing yards and a touchdown for his career high.

==== Tabor vs Peru State ====
	1	2	3	4	Total
Tabor	10	21	7	7	**45**
**Peru State**	6	22	7	13	**48**

The Tabor Bluejays took the lead early in the game, but possession of the lead shifted five times through the four quarters of play. Tabor managed 617 yards in total offense, but it wasn't enough to stop Peru State from pulling ahead in the last quarter to win 48–45.

Tabor's Duray Gardener managed 219 yards receiving and Bruce Nix added on another 117. Peru State had the advantage in punting, with Parker Sexton's 5 punts averaging 39 yards with a long of 45, compared to Tabor's average 19 yards with a long of 23. Peru state also showed a marked advantage in penalties, having committed only 1 for 15 yards when Tabor committed seven and gave up a total of 71 yards.

==== #22 Kansas Wesleyan vs Bethany ====
	1	2	3	4	Total
**#22 Kansas Wesleyan**	10	28	14	14	**66**
Bethany	7	27	7	8	**49**

Bethany College managed 27 points in the second quarter, but it would fall short to the necessary points required to defeat conference rival Kansas Wesleyan. Three different times during the game, Bethany managed to obtain the lead only to lose it to the Coyotes.

Kansas Wesleyan managed 639 yards in total offense and Bethany accumulated 585–both teams combining for 1,224 yards in total offense for the game that produced a total of 115 points between the two teams.

==== Bethel vs Friends ====
	1	2	3	4	Total
Bethel	0	0	6	6	**12**
**Friends**	15	14	0	14	**43**

Friends University took the lead in the first quarter when Chris Robles returned a punt for a touchdown and the team never looked back.

The Bethel Threshers managed two touchdowns in the second half-the first a 9-yard pass from Jason Vail to Cody O'Brien; the second a 3-yard rush by Ben Suchsland. Both sides combined for 15 penalties that accumulated to over 120 yards.

=== Week 6 ===
Date	Time	Visiting team	Home team	Site	TV	Result	Attendance	Ref.
October 9, 2010	1:30 pm	Saint Mary	No. 7 **McPherson**	McPherson Stadium • McPherson, Kansas	Victory Sports Network	24–73	-	
October 9, 2010	1:30 pm	Tabor	No. 13 **Ottawa**	Peoples Bank Field • Ottawa, Kansas	Victory Sports Network	6–55	-	
October 9, 2010	1:30 pm	**Friends**	Sterling	Smisor Stadium • Sterling, Kansas	Victory Sports Network	20–13	-	
October 9, 2010	2:00 pm	Haskell	No. 17 **Kansas Wesleyan**	Salina Stadium • Salina, Kansas	Victory Sports Network	**W** 7–59	-	
October 9, 2010	7:00 pm	**Bethany**	Bethel	Thresher Stadium • North Newton, Kansas	Victory Sports Network	44–31	-	
^{#}Rankings from NAIA Coaches' Poll. All times are in Central Time.

==== Saint Mary vs No. 7 McPherson ====
	1	2	3	4	Total
Saint Mary	7	3	0	14	**24**
**#7 McPherson**	28	28	3	14	**73**

The University of Saint Mary scored first on a Cameron Ridley 2-yard run for a touchdown to take the lead 7–0 but would not score again until time ran out in the first half when Bobby Schattle successfully kicked a 20-yard field goal putting Saint Mary at 10 points.

The problem for Saint Mary was that McPherson managed to score 56 points in between.

McPherson was fairly even in splitting their offensive production among passing and rushing, with 285 and 275 yards respectively to achieve 560 yards of total offense. Both teams managed to score a few more times in the second half, but never enough to bring the game within reach for Saint Mary and the score closed out with a victory for the nationally ranked McPherson Bulldogs.

==== Tabor vs No. 13 Ottawa ====
	1	2	3	4	Total
Tabor	3	0	3	0	**6**
**#13 Ottawa**	6	21	21	7	**55**

Nationally ranked No. 13 Ottawa University improved its record to 5–1 with a victory over Tabor College. Tabor managed to stay with Ottawa in the first quarter by answering Ottawa's first field goal with one of their own to tie the score 3–3. Later in the quarter Ottawa's Casey Wieder would kick a second field goal to put the Braves ahead 6–3, and the Braves held the lead for the remainder of the game.

In total, Weider's foot was good for a total of 13 points, which included two field goals, the longest of which was 42 yards. Ottawa Piled on 575 yards of total offense to conclude the game 55–6.

==== Friends vs Sterling ====
	1	2	3	4	Total
**Friends**	6	7	7	0	**20**
Sterling	7	3	0	3	**13**

Friends University traveled to Sterling College and secured a conference victory with equally-matched rushing and passing production of 228 yards–totaling 456 yards in 85 plays for an average of 5.4 yards per play. Friends lost the ball three times on fumbles.

Friends Punter Drew Johnson matched his season-best with a 61-yard kick.

==== Haskell vs No. 17 Kansas Wesleyan ====
	1	2	3	4	Total
Haskell	7	0	0	0	**7**
**#17 Kansas Wesleyan**	21	14	14	10	**59**

Seventeenth-ranked Kansas Wesleyan (KW) hosted Haskell Indian Nations University in a non-conference match-up to a 59–7 victory. KW scored first when quarterback Doug Webster hit Ricky Roberts for a 55-yard touchdown pass in the first quarter. KW scored again when Jake Winship pushed the ball over the goal line to put KW up 14–0.

At least a dozen ball carriers teamed up to produce 215 rushing yards for KW. Four players threw passes for KW to tack on an additional 339 yards passing (299 yards and 4 touchdowns from QB Webster alone).

The Haskell Indians had a bright spot in fourth-down conversions, successfully making two of the four attempts.

==== Bethany vs Bethel ====
	1	2	3	4	Total
**Bethany**	14	13	7	10	**44**
Bethel	0	12	6	13	**31**

Bethany College traveled to North Newton and defeated conference opponent Bethel by starting with two touchdowns in the first quarter. Bethel managed to put up 477 yards in total offence to Bethany's 509, but it was not enough and the Threshers were defeated 31–44.

With a mere 4:45 left in the game, Bethel managed to get the score within 6 points when quarterback Jason Vail connected with Austin Unruh for a 35-yard touchdown pass and Jamess Cousler made the extra point. But with a minute and a half left, Bethany's Zachary Waggoner completed a 15-yard carry for a touchdown to seal the win.

=== Week 7 ===
Date	Time	Visiting team	Home team	Site	TV	Result	Attendance	Ref.
October 16, 2010	1:30 pm	Southwestern	**Bethany**	Lindstrom Field • Lindsborg, Kansas	Victory Sports Network	35–41 ^{1OT}	-	
October 16, 2010	1:30 pm	Peru State	No. 25 **Friends**	Adair-Austin Stadium • Wichita, Kansas	Victory Sports Network	**W** 13–38	-	
October 16, 2010	1:30 pm	No. 14 Kansas Wesleyan	No. 7 **McPherson**	McPherson Stadium • McPherson, Kansas	Victory Sports Network	42–56	-	
October 16, 2010	1:30 pm	Bethel	**Saint Mary**	Saint Mary Field • Leavenworth, Kansas	Victory Sports Network	26–42	-	
October 16, 2010	2:00 pm	**Sterling**	Tabor	Joel Wiens Stadium • Hillsboro, Kansas	Victory Sports Network	33–14	-	
^{#}Rankings from NAIA Coaches' Poll. All times are in Central Time.

==== Southwestern vs Bethany ====
	1	2	3	4	OT	Total
Southwestern	14	12	9	0	0	**35**
**Bethany**	7	14	14	0	6	**41**

The Southwestern Moundbuilders and Bethany Terrible Swedes had to go to overtime to settle their game in the first overtime match-up for the season in the conference. When it was all over, Bethany managed to end up ahead 35–41.

Southwestern put up 528 yards of total offense and was 12–21 on third down conversions. Bethany answered with 473 yards of total offense and 6–17 on third down. Southwestern's defenseman Zak Tazkargy returned two interceptions for touchdowns (44 yards and 62 yards) in the first half. Bethany managed to stay with the Builders into overtime when Quarterback Darby House hit Matthew Redding with a 12-yard pass for a touchdown.

==== Peru State vs No. 25 Friends ====
	1	2	3	4	Total
Peru State	0	7	0	6	**13**
**#25 Friends**	7	14	7	10	**38**

The Friends Falcons recorded 446 yards of total offense and achieved 21 first downs on the way to secure a 38–13 home victory against non-conference opponent Peru State.

Two individual players for Friends posted noteworthy performances: wide receiver Doug Pierce of Friends caught for 130 yards and a touchdown, averaging over 27 yards per reception. Friends Punter Drew Johnson had two kicks with a long of 70 yards, moving him to the No. 7 position nationally among punters in the NAIA.

==== #14 Kansas Wesleyan vs No. 7 McPherson ====
	1	2	3	4	Total
Kansas Wesleyan	7	13	15	7	**42**
**McPherson**	7	21	21	7	**56**

Kansas Wesleyan's Doug Webster hit Anthony Berry with a 54-yard pass for a touchdown in the first quarter in this match-up between two nationally ranked teams. Later that period, McPherson's Shane Mascarenas answered with a 61-yard pass to Andy Skinner for their touchdown. With both extra points good, the game was tied 7–7 at the end of the first quarter.

McPherson scored two consecutive touchdowns in the second quarter and held the lead for the remainder of the game, although twice McPherson managed to get within 8 points. Kansas Wesleyan put up 560 yards of total offense with six touchdowns while McPherson recorded 629 total yards and 8 touchdowns. McPherson's running back Aaron Lafitte and Wesleyan's quarterback Doug Webster both rushed for over 100 yards. Webster also threw 358 yards in the game.

==== Bethel vs Saint Mary ====
	1	2	3	4	Total
Bethel	7	7	0	12	**26**
**Saint Mary**	0	21	7	14	**42**

Two teams without victories for the season met, and one remained in the conference cellar. The Bethel Threshers took an early lead with two touchdowns when Jason Vail completed a 12-yard pass to Andrew and Cameron Stultz completed a 6-yard run–James Cousler was successful on both conversion kicks and Bethel was up 14–0. It was the first time Bethel had managed to take the lead in a game for the entire season, but four unanswered touchdowns by Saint Mary put the Spires ahead for the remainder of the game.

==== Sterling vs Tabor ====
	1	2	3	4	Total
**Sterling**	16	0	3	14	**33**
Tabor	0	0	7	7	**14**

Sterling College's kicker Doug Dunn scored 15 points with 4 field goals and 3 extra points to help lift his team past Tabor 33–14.

Tabor managed 359 yards in total offense and two touchdowns, short of Sterling's 390 yards and three touchdowns. Turnovers were the story, as Sterling picked three interceptions and recovered two additional fumbles.

=== Week 8 ===
Date	Time	Visiting team	Home team	Site	TV	Result	Attendance	Ref.
October 23, 2010	1:30 pm	**Tabor**	Bethel	Thresher Stadium • North Newton, Kansas	Victory Sports Network	55–7	-	
October 23, 2010	1:30 pm	Bethany	No. 22 **Friends**	Adair-Austin Stadium • Wichita, Kansas	Victory Sports Network	28–60	-	
October 23, 2010	1:30 pm	**Sterling**	No. 18 Kansas Wesleyan	Salina Stadium • Salina, Kansas	Victory Sports Network	22–21	-	
October 23, 2010	1:30 pm	Saint Mary	No. 10 **Ottawa**	Peoples Bank Field • Ottawa, Kansas	Victory Sports Network	16–34	-	
October 23, 2010	2:00 pm	No. 6 **McPherson**	Southwestern	Richard L. Jantz Stadium • Winfield, Kansas	Victory Sports Network	55–21	-	
^{#}Rankings from NAIA Coaches' Poll. All times are in Central Time.

==== Tabor vs Bethel ====
	1	2	3	4	Total
**Tabor**	21	14	14	6	**55**
Bethel	0	0	7	0	**7**

Tabor College picked up its second win of the season against the winless Bethel Threshers in a 55–7 romp. Bethel picked up only one touchdown in the third quarter after Tabor had already put 42 points on the board.

Tabor managed 454 yards of total offense and 7 offensive touchdowns. On defense, Tabor picked up four interceptions—one by Charles Urrutia who ran 43 yards for a touchdown. Bethel was only able to produce 265 yards of total offense in the game and the sole touchdown came when quarterback Jason Vail hit Andrew McNary for a 29-yard pass. Bethel's defense did manage to block an extra point kick in the fourth quarter for another bright spot for the Threshers.

==== Bethany vs No. 22 Friends ====
	1	2	3	4	Total
Bethany	6	7	7	8	**28**
**#22 Friends**	14	14	15	17	**60**

Bethany scored first in the game, but Friends took the lead back in the first quarter and held it for the rest of the game in its best offensive performance of the season to date.

Bethany's offense ended the game with 396 total yards, while the Friends Falcons offense achieved 442 yards. Friends managed 7 offensive touchdowns plus defensive back Jeff Kontz picked a 17-yard interception return for a touchdown. The Terrible Swedes could only muster 4 touchdowns, giving Friends the victory after the final score of 60–24.

==== Sterling vs No. 18 Kansas Wesleyan ====
	1	2	3	4	Total
**Sterling**	3	7	0	12	**22**
#18 Kansas Wesleyan	0	14	7	0	**21**

Kansas Wesleyan's 408 yards of total offense, 25 first downs, three touchdowns, and national ranking of No. 18 would not be enough to defeat the Sterling Warriors who managed to successfully upset their opponent.

Both sides missed extra points after touchdowns, but it was a field goal in the first quarter that made the difference for Sterling that led to their 22–21 victory.

==== Saint Mary vs No. 10 Ottawa ====
	1	2	3	4	Total
Saint Mary	10	0	0	6	**16**
**#10 Ottawa**	17	3	7	7	**34**

Ottawa University scored two touchdowns and a field goal in the first quarter on their way to defeating the Saint Mary Spires by a score of 34–16.

The Braves offense recorded 410 total yards and four touchdowns in the victory. Ottawa managed 26 first downs and was forced to punt only four times in the entire game. Saint Mary pulled three interceptions during the game but also lost three fumbles. Saint Mary's offense produced 312 yards overall for their third best game total of the season.

==== #6 McPherson vs Southwestern ====
	1	2	3	4	Total
**#6 McPherson**	7	20	21	7	**55**
Southwestern	7	0	7	7	**21**

McPherson scored first with a touchdown and Southwestern answered to tie the score 7–7, but the remaining three quarters of play were dominated by the sixth ranked McPherson Bulldogs.

McPherson's offense piled on 557 yards of total offense with six touchdowns. Linebacker Darrick Johnson added a 46-yard fumble return for a touchdown and kicker Travis Eason put 13 points into the mix, two of which were field goals. Southwestern's 388 yards of offense ended up providing three touchdowns, but it fell short and undefeated McPherson left Winfield with another victory and a 7–0 record after the final score of 55–21.

=== Week 9 ===
Date	Time	Visiting team	Home team	Site	TV	Result	Attendance	Ref.
October 30, 2010	1:30 pm	Tabor	No. 6 **McPherson**	McPherson Stadium • McPherson, Kansas	Victory Sports Network	14–40	-	
October 30, 2010	1:30 pm	**Southwestern**	Bethel	Thresher Stadium • North Newton, Kansas (0)	Victory Sports Network	52–14	-	
October 30, 2010	1:30 pm	No. 19 Friends	**Saint Mary**	Saint Mary Field • Leavenworth, Kansas	Victory Sports Network	35–38	-	
October 30, 2010	1:30 pm	Bethany	**Sterling**	Smisor Stadium • Sterling, Kansas	Victory Sports Network	7–26	-	
October 30, 2010	2:00 pm	No. 10 **Ottawa**	No. 23 Kansas Wesleyan	Salina Stadium • Salina, Kansas	Victory Sports Network	49–45	-	
^{#}Rankings from NAIA Coaches' Poll. All times are in Central Time.

==== Tabor at No. 6 McPherson ====
	1	2	3	4	Total
Tabor	0	0	0	14	**14**
**#6 McPherson**	10	20	10	0	**40**

The sixth-ranked McPherson Bulldogs took their home field advantage to a 40–14 victory over the visiting Tabor Bluejays. McPherson took the lead early on and maintained it through the entire game.

Tabor's offense managed to attain 257 yards, while McPherson put up 386 yards of total offense. McPherson managed five touchdowns and two field goals, whereas Tabor's only scores were for two offensive touchdowns and two successful extra point kicks.

==== Southwestern at Bethel ====
	1	2	3	4	Total
**Southwestern**	28	3	14	7	**52**
Bethel	7	0	0	7	**14**

Unranked Southwestern College managed to pick up its second win of the season over conference opponent Bethel College in a 52–14 rout. The Moundbuilders began with a 28–7 lead after the first quarter and continued to dominate through the game.

Southwestern successfully completed 553 yards of total offense and seven touchdowns in the victory. While Bethel only was able to record 345 yards in total offense and two touchdowns, the Threshers found a few bright spots by only giving up 20 yards on 2 penalties and averaging 6.1 yards per offensive play. Eight different players caught a pass for Bethel during the loss.

==== #19 Friends at Saint Mary ====
	1	2	3	4	Total
#19 Friends	0	14	14	7	**35**
**Saint Mary**	3	14	7	14	**38**

The nineteenth-ranked Friends University Falcons traveled to the Saint Mary Spires to play their unranked opponent. However, it was the underdog Spires who walked away with a 38–35 victory.

On paper, the statistics seem to point to Friends for the victory. Friends had more total offense (466 yards to 411 yards), more first downs (27–20), fewer penalties (4 for 35 yards, compared to 10 for 75 yards), greater yards per punt (51 compared to 36 1/2), and even managed an interception. However, the final score would not be in their favor.

Saint Mary's 411 yards of total offense was made up of a mere 11 yards rushing. Quick math shows that to be 400 yards of passing offense, and all five touchdowns came by the air. Those five touchdowns and Bobby Schattle's 41-yard field goal was enough for the Spires to celebrate victory for the second time this year. Friends managed to maintain a top-25 ranking, but fell six positions to number 25 in the next week's coach's poll. The game is likely to be considered the biggest victory in the relatively short history of the Saint Mary program, and likely will prevent Friends from achieving a playoff berth in the NAIA national championships.

==== Bethany at Sterling ====
	1	2	3	4	Total
Bethany	7	0	0	0	**7**
**Sterling**	14	0	2	10	**26**

Bethany was able to stay with Sterling College for the first 8 minutes of the game as the score was caught up 7–7, but Sterling's Keoki Burbank completed a 34-yard run for a touchdown and Sterling held the lead for the remainder of the game.

Both teams punted seven times and combined penalty yards totaled 30 with only six penalties the entire game. Sterling's offense had greater results on the ground, compiling 274 yards rushing shared among at least eight separate ball carriers. Sterling's three touchdowns, one field goal, and one safety led the final score to a 26–7 victory.

==== #10 Ottawa at No. 23 Kansas Wesleyan ====
	1	2	3	4	Total
**#10 Ottawa**	14	7	14	14	**49**
#23 Kansas Wesleyan	3	21	21	0	**45**

The lead swapped four times during the game between two nationally ranked teams Ottawa and Kansas Wesleyan. With less than one minute to go and within a span of fifteen seconds on the clock, Ottawa scored two touchdowns and took the lead back permanently to win the game 29–45.

Ottawa managed to put up fewer yards in total offense of 555, compared to KW's 673. However, Ottawa also managed to pull in a defensive touchdown when Fielding Barenner converted a 10-yard interception return for six points. Kansas Wesleyan also committed 14 penalties for a total of 128 yards. The game knocked Kansas Wesleyan completely out of the top 25 rankings the next week while Ottawa stayed put at #10.

=== Week 10 ===
Date	Time	Visiting team	Home team	Site	TV	Result	Attendance	Ref.
November 6, 2010	1:30 pm	**Kansas Wesleyan**	No. 25 Friends	Adair-Austin Stadium • Wichita, Kansas	Victory Sports Network	36–33	-	
November 6, 2010	1:30 pm	No. 10 **Ottawa**	Bethany	McPherson Stadium • McPherson, Kansas	Victory Sports Network	39–33	-	
November 6, 2010	1:30 pm	Bethel	No. 6 **McPherson**	McPherson Stadium • McPherson, Kansas	Victory Sports Network	0–47	-	
November 6, 2010	1:30 pm	Southwestern	**Tabor**	Joel Wiens Stadium • Hillsboro, Kansas	Victory Sports Network	28–55	-	
November 6, 2010	2:00 pm	**Sterling**	Saint Mary	Saint Mary Field • Leavenworth, Kansas	Victory Sports Network	21–13	-	
^{#}Rankings from NAIA Coaches' Poll. All times are in Central Time.

==== Kansas Wesleyan at No. 25 Friends ====
	1	2	3	4	Total
**Kansas Wesleyan**	7	6	15	8	**36**
#25 Friends	7	14	6	6	**33**

Kansas Wesleyan upset the nationally ranked Friends Falcons when Doug Webster completed a 1-yard run for a touchdown with under 4 minutes remaining in the fourth quarter. The lead changed several times during the game but Kansas Wesleyan held it at the conclusion of the game.

Wesleyan defensive back Sonny Gallegos completed one interception for the game—but it was the one needed to clinch the victory. His interception of Friends QB Jayme Bristow's pass at the Wesleyan 30-yard line with 6 seconds left ended a last-ditch effort for Friends. The loss for Friends was enough to keep the team from participating in the NAIA national championship playoffs.

==== #10 Ottawa at Bethany ====
	1	2	3	4	Total
**#10 Ottawa**	13	12	0	14	**39**
Bethany	7	3	16	7	**33**

Unranked Bethany pulled within two points of the tenth-ranked Ottawa Braves in the third quarter, but Ottawa managed to take control of the game to a final score of 39–33 for the victory. Ottawa's special teams managed to score two touchdowns and the defense produced a touchdown and a safety to count toward the victory and managed to keep hopes for a place in the NAIA national championship playoff.

==== Bethel at No. 6 McPherson ====
	1	2	3	4	Total
Bethel	0	0	0	0	**0**
**#6 McPherson**	26	7	14	0	**47**

Bethel College failed to put up points of any kind in its 47–0 loss to No. 6 McPherson. The Bulldogs put the game out of reach in the first quarter by scoring 26 points. The victory was enough to lock McPherson in as the conference champions for the first time since 1952.

The home game for McPherson was "senior day" as 21 seniors on the team were honored.

==== Southwestern at Tabor ====
	1	2	3	4	Total
Southwestern	0	0	21	7	**28**
**Tabor**	20	14	7	14	**55**

Tabor secured a win against Southwestern by getting off to an early lead 41–0. Southwestern attempted an unsuccessful comeback by scoring 21 points in the third quarter, but it would not be enough to change the outcome of the game.

Tabor's offense put up eight touchdowns in the game (4 rushing and 4 passing) and the game concluded with a final score of 55–28.

==== Sterling at Saint Mary ====
	1	2	3	4	Total
**Sterling**	7	7	7	0	**21**
Saint Mary	0	7	3	3	**13**

The Saint Mary Spires put up more yards of offense than rival Sterling College, but Sterling managed to hold on to win 21–13 win after Saint Mary had to settle for field goals on drives. The game concluded with a final score of 21–13.

Saint Mary had minus 4 rushing yards but successfully put up 205 yards passing. In comparison, Sterling put up 165 yards rushing and 88 passing. Saint Mary managed 19 first downs; Sterling was able to record 14.

=== Week 11 ===
Date	Time	Visiting team	Home team	Site	TV	Result	Attendance	Ref.
November 13, 2010	1:30 pm	No. 6 **McPherson**	Bethany	Lindstrom Field • Lindsborg, Kansas	Victory Sports Network	52–35	-	
November 13, 2010	1:30 pm	Friends	No. 8 **Ottawa**	Peoples Bank Field • Ottawa, Kansas	Victory Sports Network	21–54	-	
November 13, 2010	1:30 pm	No. 25 **Kansas Wesleyan**	Southwestern	Richard L. Jantz Stadium • Winfield, Kansas	Victory Sports Network	72–48	-	
November 13, 2010	1:30 pm	Bethel	**Sterling**	Smisor Stadium • Sterling, Kansas	Victory Sports Network	14–62	-	
November 13, 2010	1:30 pm	Saint Mary	**Tabor**	Joel Wiens Stadium • Hillsboro, Kansas	Victory Sports Network	7–27	-	
^{#}Rankings from NAIA Coaches' Poll. All times are in Central Time.

==== #6 McPherson at Bethany ====
	1	2	3	4	Total
**#6 McPherson**	7	21	0	24	**52**
Bethany	13	0	22	0	**35**

The Terrible Swedes of Bethany nearly surprised the NAIA world and twice held the lead against McPherson in an attempt to play "spoiler" to a perfect season for the Bulldogs. After three quarters of play, Bethany had pulled ahead 28–35. The fourth quarter was all McPherson with three touchdowns and a field goal to end the game 52–35, including a 19-yard fumble return for touchdown by Ginikachi Ibe with eleven seconds remaining in the game. Bethany proved to be the most challenging opponent for McPherson of the season.

McPherson ended the game as undefeated conference champions for the regular season and earned home-field advantage for the first round of the NAIA National Championship playoffs.

==== Friends at No. 8 Ottawa ====
	1	2	3	4	Total
Friends	0	7	7	7	**21**
**#8 Ottawa**	14	21	3	16	**54**

Ottawa University concluded its regular season with a 54–21 victory over Friends to end up 9–1 in regular season, 8–1 in conference play, and home-field advantage in the NAIA National Championships Playoff.

Friends exceeded Ottawa in total offensive yards with 446 compared to 401 and achieved more first downs by a marked 27–17, while Ottawa committed significantly more penalties (12 for 112 yards compared to 3 for 25 yards). However, it was not enough for Friends to overcome quarterback Jayme Bristow 's seven interceptions, including a 96-yard interception for a touchdown by Ottawa's Matt Gross in the first quarter. Ottawa's Clarence Anderson pitched in for an 87-yard kickoff return for a touchdown in the second quarter.

Ottawa ended the regular season ranked No. 8 in the nation and continues on in post-season play.

==== #25 Kansas Wesleyan at Southwestern ====
	1	2	3	4	Total
**#25 Kansas Wesleyan**	14	21	24	13	**72**
Southwestern	14	13	7	14	**48**

Two teams combined for 120 points in the final conference match-up between #25-ranked Kansas Wesleyan and Southwestern College. Southwestern stayed with Wesleyan in the first quarter to keep the score tied 14–14, and scored a touchdown with 33 seconds left in the second quarter to pull the game within 8 points. Kansas Wesleyan broke free in the third quarter to outscore their opponents 24–7 and Southwestern could not recover from there.

Kansas Wesleyan put up a whopping 710 yards of total offense with 36 first downs and Southwestern managed to post 563 yards and 34 first downs. Kansas Wesleyan went 6 for 10 on third down attempts and Southwestern achieved 17 for 25 in the same are. Both teams were 1–2 on fourth down attempts. The final score ended 72–48 in favor of Kansas Wesleyan.

==== Bethel at Sterling ====
	1	2	3	4	Total
Bethel	0	7	0	7	**14**
**Sterling**	14	35	0	13	**62**

The Bethel Threshers concluded their 2010 season without a single victory on record. For the final game they traveled to Sterling College and were soundly beaten 62–14.

Sterling scored 35 points in the second quarter alone and managed 593 yards in total offense. Bethel did manage to achieve 248 yards in passing and kept penalties under control, only giving up 3 penalties for 34 yards (Sterling had 13 penalties for 110 yards).

The KCAC regular season ended with Bethel's record at 0–10 and Sterling's record at 7–3.

==== Saint Mary at Tabor ====
	1	2	3	4	Total
Saint Mary	0	7	0	0	**7**
**Tabor**	10	7	7	3	**27**

Tabor College completed its 2010 season with a home-field victory over University of Saint Mary. Tabor ended its season at the 4–6 mark, posting more victories than the previous three seasons combined. Saint Mary concluded with a 2–8 record, its worst finish since 2003.

Tabor got off to an early lead when James Monroe completed a 10-yard run for a touchdown. Saint Mary's only score was a touchdown late in the second quarter to pull within ten points. Tabor managed to score in every quarter, successfully converted 10 of 18 third downs, and achieved 409 yards of total offense. The game concluded 27–7.

== Post-season ==
Two teams from the conference qualified to compete in the 2010 NAIA Football National Championship. Undefeated McPherson made its second trip to the tournament and Ottawa (whose only loss was to McPherson) also was selected. Both teams claimed home-field advantage in the first round. Each was defeated by their opponents and thus ended all play in the conference for the remainder of the season. Including post-season play, all conference teams combined for a record of 6 wins and 6 losses against non-conference opponents.

Date	Time	Visiting team	Home team	Site	TV	Result	Attendance	Ref.
November 20, 2010	1:30 pm	No. 11 Marian	No. 8 Ottawa	Peoples Bank Field • Ottawa, Kansas (NAIA National Championships first round game 8)	Victory Sports Network	L 35–20	-	
November 20, 2010	2:00 pm	No. 12 McKendree	No. 6 McPherson	McPherson Stadium • McPherson, Kansas (NAIA National Championships first round game 6)	Victory Sports Network	L 38–14	-	
^{#}Rankings from NAIA Coaches' Poll. All times are in Central Time.

=== #11 Marian at No. 8 Ottawa ===
	1	2	3	4	Total
#11 Marian	7	7	14	7	35
#8 Ottawa	7	13	0	0	20

Ottawa completed its worst game on offense in terms of total yards for the season, only coming up with 246. Ottawa did manage to take the lead twice, but in the third quarter Marian would take the lead for good.

Defensively, Ottawa's Eric Wilson returned a 98-yard interception for a touchdown but the final score would fall 15 points short to end at 35–20.

=== #12 McKendree at No. 6 McPherson ===
	1	2	3	4	Total
#12 McKendree	14	7	10	7	38
#6 McPherson	7	0	7	0	14

McKendree took off to a 14-point lead in the first quarter and maintained the lead for the remainder of the game, dumping McPherson for their second first-round playoff loss in two years. It was the first loss for McPherson in the season, which ended with a final record of 10–1.

McKendree scored five touchdowns and claimed victory in the end with a final score of 38–14.

== Player and coach awards ==
McPherson head coach Joe Bettasso was named Coach of the Year in the conference and Chuck Lambert of Sterling was named the Assistant Coach of the Year. Shane Mascarenas of McPherson was named Player of the Year. The Offensive Player of the Year is Doug Webster of Kansas Wesleyan and the Defensive Player of the Year is Scott Jones of McPherson. Noah Wooten, senior linebacker at University of Saint Mary, received the Dr. Ted Kessinger Champion of Character award.
