= 2013 Kansas Collegiate Athletic Conference football season =

- KCAC Football official logo
- League: NAIA
- Sport: football
- Duration: Fall-Winter 2013
- Teams: 10

2013

Football seasons
- ← 2012 2014 →

2013 Kansas Collegiate Athletic Conference football standings
	Conf.			Overall
Team	W		L	W		L
No. 14 Sterling $^	8	–	1	9	–	3
No. 8 Tabor ^	7	–	2	10	–	3
No. 17 Friends	7	–	2	8	–	3
No. 15 Ottawa ^	7	–	2	8	–	4
McPherson	4	–	5	5	–	6
Southwestern (KS)	4	–	5	5	–	6
Kansas Wesleyan	3	–	6	4	–	7
Saint Mary (KS)	3	–	6	4	–	7
Bethany (KS)	1	–	8	2	–	9
Bethel (KS)	1	–	8	2	–	9
$ – Conference champion; ^ – NAIA playoff participant; Rankings from NAIA Coaches' Poll

The 2013 Kansas Collegiate Athletic Conference football season is made up of 10 United States college athletic programs that compete in the Kansas Collegiate Athletic Conference (KCAC) under the National Association of Intercollegiate Athletics (NAIA) for the 2013 college football season. The season began play on August 31, 2013.

== Conference teams and information ==
Conference rules require each team to play all other teams within the conference and two other regular season non-conference game for a total of 11 games. Up until 2011, the conference only allowed a 10-game season.

Two teams begin the season with new head coaches. Bethel's current coach is Martin Mathis. Mathis replaces James Dotson, who took over the role for one season after the sudden resignation of Travis Graber on July 27, 2012.

Bethany's Manny Matsakis is also new to his team and a first-year head coach. Matsakis was announced as the new head coach for the Swedes in March 2013 to replace Jamie Cruce after his resignation.

School	Mascot	Head coach	Location	Stadium
Bethany	Swedes	Manny Matsakis	Lindsborg, Kansas	Lindstrom Field
Bethel	Threshers	Martin Mathis	North Newton, Kansas	Thresher Stadium
Friends	Falcons	Monty Lewis	Wichita, Kansas	Adair-Austin Stadium
Kansas Wesleyan	Coyotes	Dave Dallas	Salina, Kansas	Salina Stadium
McPherson	Bulldogs	Pete Sterbick	McPherson, Kansas	McPherson Stadium
Ottawa	Braves	Kent Kessinger	Ottawa, Kansas	Peoples Bank Field
Saint Mary	Spires	Lance Hinson	Leavenworth, Kansas	Saint Mary Field
Southwestern	Moundbuilders	Ken Crandall	Winfield, Kansas	Richard L. Jantz Stadium
Sterling	Warriors	Andy Lambert	Sterling, Kansas	Smisor Stadium
Tabor	Bluejays	Mike Gardner	Hillsboro, Kansas	Joel Wiens Stadium

== Preseason outlook ==
The 2013 NAIA football rankings released their annual spring poll on April 15, 2013. Two teams from the conference were ranked in the top 25: #16 Ottawa and #19 Tabor. A third team, Kansas Wesleyan, received votes in the poll. The poll rankings changed slightly with the Preseason Poll on August 12, 2013: Tabor was ranked ahead of Ottawa at 17th and 18th. Kansas Weleyan did not receive any votes, but Friends managed to receive nine.

== Schedule ==
The season began play on August 31, 2013.

=== Week 0 ===
Date	Time	Visiting team	Home team	Site	TV	Result	Attendance	Ref.
August 31, 2013		No. RV Bacone (Okla.)	McPherson	McPherson Stadium • McPherson, Kansas		37–31	-	
August 31, 2013		Haskell (Kan.)	Bethel	Thresher Stadium • North Newton, Kansas		–	-	
August 31, 2013		Southwestern	Oklahoma Baptist	tbd • Shawnee, Oklahoma		–	-	
^{#}Rankings from NAIA Coaches' Poll. All times are in Central Time.

=== Week 1 ===
Date	Time	Visiting team	Home team	Site	TV	Result	Attendance	Ref.
September 7, 2013		Bethany	Southwestern Assemblies of God	Lumpkins Stadium • Waxahachie, Texas		–	-	
September 7, 2013		Doane (Neb.)	No. RV Friends	Adair-Austin Stadium • Wichita, Kansas		–	-	
September 7, 2013		No. 16 Ottawa	No. 14 Baker (Kan.)	Liston Stadium • Baldwin City, Kansas		–	-	
September 7, 2013		No. 19 Tabor	No. RV Nebraska Wesleyan	Abel Stadium • Lincoln, Nebraska		–	-	
September 7, 2013		Kansas Wesleyan	Hastings (Neb.)	Lloyd Wilson Stadium • Hastings, Nebraska		–	-	
September 7, 2013		Sterling	Oklahoma Panhandle State	Carl Wooten Field • Goodwell, Oklahoma		–	-	
September 7, 2013		Saint Mary	Oklahoma Baptist	tbd • Shawnee, Oklahoma		–	-	
^{#}Rankings from NAIA Coaches' Poll. All times are in Central Time.

=== Week 2 ===
Date	Time	Visiting team	Home team	Site	TV	Result	Attendance	Ref.
September 14, 2013		Missouri Valley	Ottawa	Peoples Bank Field • Ottawa, Kansas		–	-	
September 14, 2013		MidAmerica Nazarene (Kan.)	Tabor	Joel Wiens Stadium • Hillsboro, Kansas		–	-	
September 14, 2013		Baker (Kan.)	Saint Mary	Saint Mary Field • Leavenworth, Kansas		–	-	
September 14, 2013		Evangel (Mo.)	Kansas Wesleyan	Salina Stadium • Salina, Kansas		–	-	
September 14, 2013		Benedictine (Kan.)	Friends	Adair-Austin Stadium • Wichita, Kansas		–	-	
September 14, 2013		Graceland (Iowa)	McPherson	McPherson Stadium • McPherson, Kansas		–	-	
September 14, 2013		Peru State (Neb.)	Southwestern	Richard L. Jantz Stadium • Winfield, Kansas		–	-	
September 14, 2013		Culver-Stockton (Mo.)	Sterling	Smisor Stadium • Sterling, Kansas		–	-	
September 14, 2013		Avila (Mo.)	Bethany	Lindstrom Field • Lindsborg, Kansas		–	-	
September 14, 2013		Central Methodist (Mo.)	Bethel	Thresher Stadium • North Newton, Kansas		–	-	
^{#}Rankings from NAIA Coaches' Poll. All times are in Central Time.

The week of September 14 marks the first Kansas Collegiate Athletic Conference – Heart of America Athletic Conference Football Series. During this week, head-to-head matchups are played from teams in the KCAC versus the Heart of America Athletic Conference. Matchups are based on the final standings of the 2012 season (see 2012 Kansas Collegiate Athletic Conference football season and 2012 Heart of America Athletic Conference football season).

=== Week 3 ===
Date	Time	Visiting team	Home team	Site	TV	Result	Attendance	Ref.
September 21, 2013		Ottawa	Bethany	Lindstrom Field • Lindsborg, Kansas		–	-	
September 21, 2013		Bethel	McPherson	McPherson Stadium • McPherson, Kansas		–	-	
September 21, 2013		Friends	Sterling	Smisor Stadium • Sterling, Kansas		–	-	
September 21, 2013		Kansas Wesleyan	Southwestern	Richard L. Jantz Stadium • Winfield, Kansas		–	-	
September 21, 2013		Saint Mary	Tabor	Joel Wiens Stadium • Hillsboro, Kansas		–	-	
^{#}Rankings from NAIA Coaches' Poll. All times are in Central Time.

=== Week 4 ===
Date	Time	Visiting team	Home team	Site	TV	Result	Attendance	Ref.
September 28, 2013		Bethany	Saint Mary	Saint Mary Field • Leavenworth, Kansas		–	-	
September 28, 2013		Bethel	Ottawa	Peoples Bank Field • Ottawa, Kansas		–	-	
September 28, 2013		Southwestern	Friends	Adair-Austin Stadium • Wichita, Kansas		–	-	
September 28, 2013		McPherson	Kansas Wesleyan	Salina Stadium • Salina, Kansas		–	-	
September 28, 2013		Tabor	Sterling	Smisor Stadium • Sterling, Kansas		–	-	
^{#}Rankings from NAIA Coaches' Poll. All times are in Central Time.

=== Week 5 ===
Date	Time	Visiting team	Home team	Site	TV	Result	Attendance	Ref.
October 5, 2013		Sterling	Bethany	Lindstrom Field • Lindsborg, Kansas		–	-	
October 5, 2013		Saint Mary	Bethel	Thresher Stadium • North Newton, Kansas		–	-	
October 5, 2013		Friends	Kansas Wesleyan	Salina Stadium • Salina, Kansas		–	-	
October 5, 2013		Ottawa	McPherson	McPherson Stadium • McPherson, Kansas		–	-	
October 5, 2013		Southwestern	Tabor	Joel Wiens Stadium • Hillsboro, Kansas		–	-	
^{#}Rankings from NAIA Coaches' Poll. All times are in Central Time.

=== Week 6 ===
Date	Time	Visiting team	Home team	Site	TV	Result	Attendance	Ref.
October 12, 2013		Bethany	Southwestern	Richard L. Jantz Stadium • Winfield, Kansas		–	-	
October 12, 2013		Sterling	Bethel	Thresher Stadium • North Newton, Kansas		–	-	
October 12, 2013		McPherson	Friends	Adair-Austin Stadium • Wichita, Kansas		–	-	
October 12, 2013		Kansas Wesleyan	Tabor	Joel Wiens Stadium • Hillsboro, Kansas		–	-	
October 12, 2013		Saint Mary	Ottawa	Peoples Bank Field • Ottawa, Kansas		–	-	
^{#}Rankings from NAIA Coaches' Poll. All times are in Central Time.

=== Week 7 ===
Date	Time	Visiting team	Home team	Site	TV	Result	Attendance	Ref.
October 19, 2013		Kansas Wesleyan	Bethany	Lindstrom Field • Lindsborg, Kansas		–	-	
October 19, 2013		Bethel	Southwestern	Richard L. Jantz Stadium • Winfield, Kansas		–	-	
October 19, 2013		Tabor	Friends	Adair-Austin Stadium • Wichita, Kansas		–	-	
October 19, 2013		McPherson	Saint Mary	Saint Mary Field • Leavenworth, Kansas		–	-	
October 19, 2013		Ottawa	Sterling	Smisor Stadium • Sterling, Kansas		–	-	
^{#}Rankings from NAIA Coaches' Poll. All times are in Central Time.

=== Week 8 ===
Date	Time	Visiting team	Home team	Site	TV	Result	Attendance	Ref.
October 26, 2013		Friends	Bethany	Lindstrom Field • Lindsborg, Kansas		–	-	
October 26, 2013		Bethel	Kansas Wesleyan	Salina Stadium • Salina, Kansas		–	-	
October 26, 2013		Tabor	McPherson	McPherson Stadium • McPherson, Kansas		–	-	
October 26, 2013		Southwestern	Ottawa	Peoples Bank Field • Ottawa, Kansas		–	-	
October 26, 2013		Sterling	Saint Mary	Saint Mary Field • Leavenworth, Kansas		–	-	
^{#}Rankings from NAIA Coaches' Poll. All times are in Central Time.

=== Week 9 ===
Date	Time	Visiting team	Home team	Site	TV	Result	Attendance	Ref.
November 2, 2013		Bethany	Tabor	Joel Wiens Stadium • Hillsboro, Kansas		–	-	
November 2, 2013		Friends	Bethel	Thresher Stadium • North Newton, Kansas		–	-	
November 2, 2013		Kansas Wesleyan	Ottawa	Peoples Bank Field • Ottawa, Kansas		–	-	
November 2, 2013		Sterling	McPherson	McPherson Stadium • McPherson, Kansas		–	-	
November 2, 2013		Saint Mary	Southwestern	Richard L. Jantz Stadium • Winfield, Kansas		–	-	
^{#}Rankings from NAIA Coaches' Poll. All times are in Central Time.

=== Week 10 ===
Date	Time	Visiting team	Home team	Site	TV	Result	Attendance	Ref.
November 9, 2013		McPherson	Bethany	Lindstrom Field • Lindsborg, Kansas		–	-	
November 9, 2013		Bethel	Tabor	Joel Wiens Stadium • Hillsboro, Kansas		–	-	
November 9, 2013		Ottawa	Friends	Adair-Austin Stadium • Wichita, Kansas		–	-	
November 9, 2013		Saint Mary	Kansas Wesleyan	Salina Stadium • Salina, Kansas		–	-	
November 9, 2013		Southwestern	Sterling	Smisor Stadium • Sterling, Kansas		–	-	
^{#}Rankings from NAIA Coaches' Poll. All times are in Central Time.

=== Week 11 ===
Date	Time	Visiting team	Home team	Site	TV	Result	Attendance	Ref.
November 16, 2013		Bethany	Bethel	Thresher Stadium • North Newton, Kansas		–	-	
November 16, 2013		Friends	Saint Mary	Saint Mary Field • Leavenworth, Kansas		–	-	
November 16, 2013		Sterling	Kansas Wesleyan	Salina Stadium • Salina, Kansas		–	-	
November 16, 2013		McPherson	Southwestern	Richard L. Jantz Stadium • Winfield, Kansas		–	-	
November 16, 2013		Tabor	Ottawa	Peoples Bank Field • Ottawa, Kansas		–	-	
^{#}Rankings from NAIA Coaches' Poll. All times are in Central Time.

== See also ==
- List of Kansas Wesleyan Coyotes head football coaches
