= List of college football venues in Kansas =

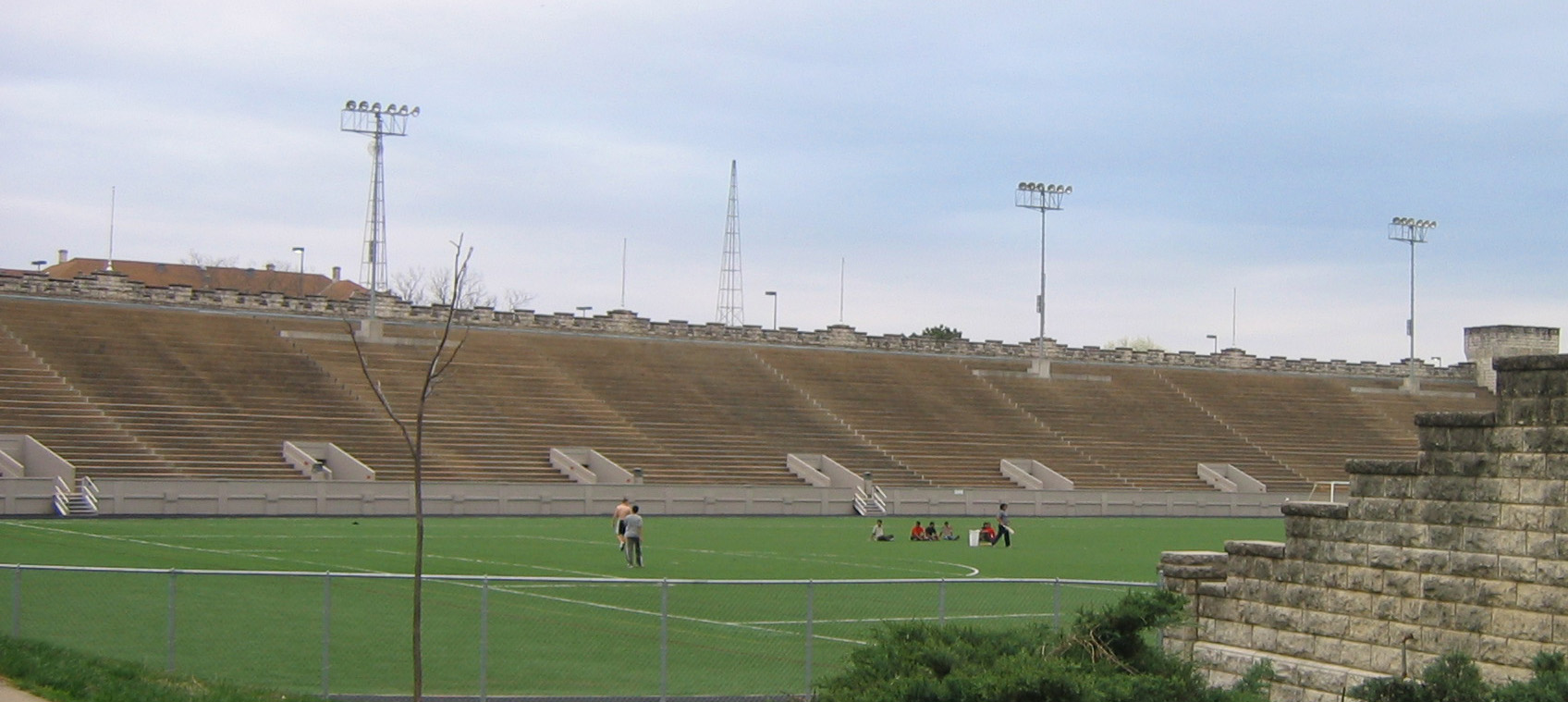
Memorial Stadium was the home of the Kansas State Wildcats football team from 1922 until 1967.

The following is a list of college football venues in Kansas. Included on this list are past and present locations that served as the home field for college football programs in the state of Kansas. The list is organized by current affiliation. Kansas does not have any NCAA Division I FCS or NCAA Division III schools.

== List of college football venues in Kansas ==
=== NCAA Division I FBS ===
- Bill Snyder Family Football Stadium - (Kansas State)
- David Booth Kansas Memorial Stadium - (Kansas)

=== NCAA Division II ===
- Carnie Smith Stadium - (Pittsburg State)
- Francis G. Welch Stadium - (Emporia State)
- Lewis Field Stadium - (Fort Hays State)
- Yager Stadium at Moore Bowl - (Washburn)

=== NAIA ===
- Adair-Austin Stadium - (Friends)
- Larry Wilcox Stadium - (Benedictine)
- Lindstrom Field - (Bethany)
- Liston Stadium - (Baker)
- Thresher Stadium - (Bethel)
- Gene Bissell Field - (Kansas Wesleyan)
  - Salina Stadium - (?? - 2015)
- McPherson Stadium - (McPherson)
- Peoples Bank Field - (Ottawa)
- Pioneer Stadium - (MidAmerica Nazarene)
- Saint Mary Field - (Saint Mary)
- Joel Wiens Stadium - (Tabor)
- Smisor Stadium - (Sterling)
- Richard L. Jantz Stadium - (Southwestern)

=== Defunct programs ===
- Cessna Stadium - Wichita State, program discontinued in 1986, scheduled for demolition on a to be determined date in 2020.
- Haskell Memorial Stadium - Haskell, program discontinued in 2015 due to lack of funds

=== Old stadiums ===
- Memorial Stadium – Kansas State, used from 1922 to 1967, no longer used for football

=== Demolished stadiums ===
- Ahearn Field – Kansas State, used from 1911 to 1921, first on-campus athletic field for the school, was on the same site as Memorial Stadium
- Bovaird Stadium - College of Emporia, used until the college closed
- McCook Field – Kansas, used from 1892 until it was demolished in 1920. The field is now the site of the current football stadium.

== Image gallery ==
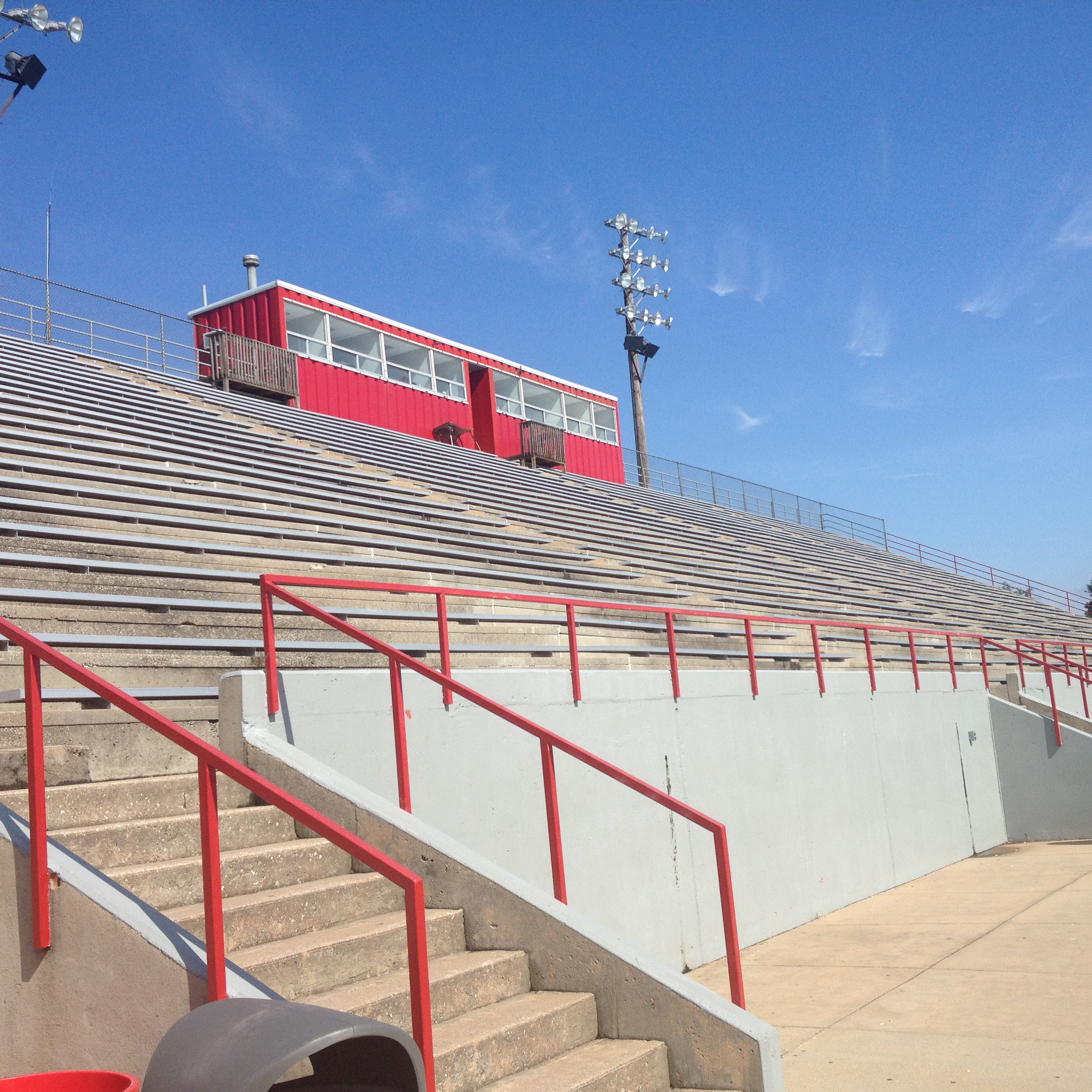
Adair-Austin Stadium, Wichita

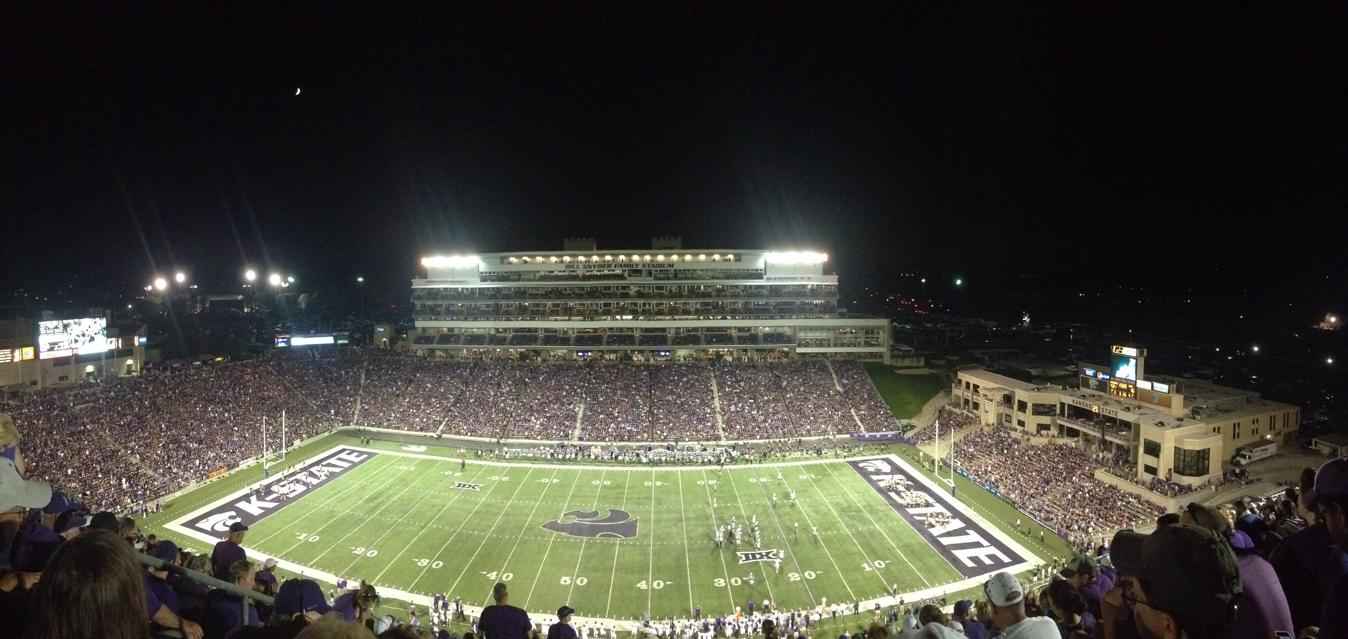
Bill Snyder Family Football Stadium, Manhattan

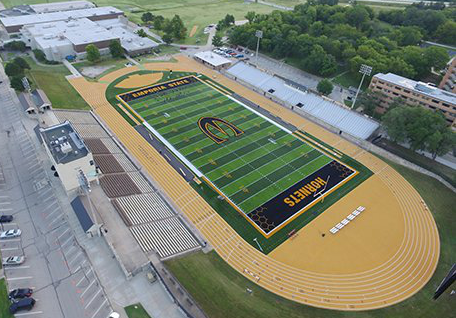
Francis G. Welch Stadium, Emporia

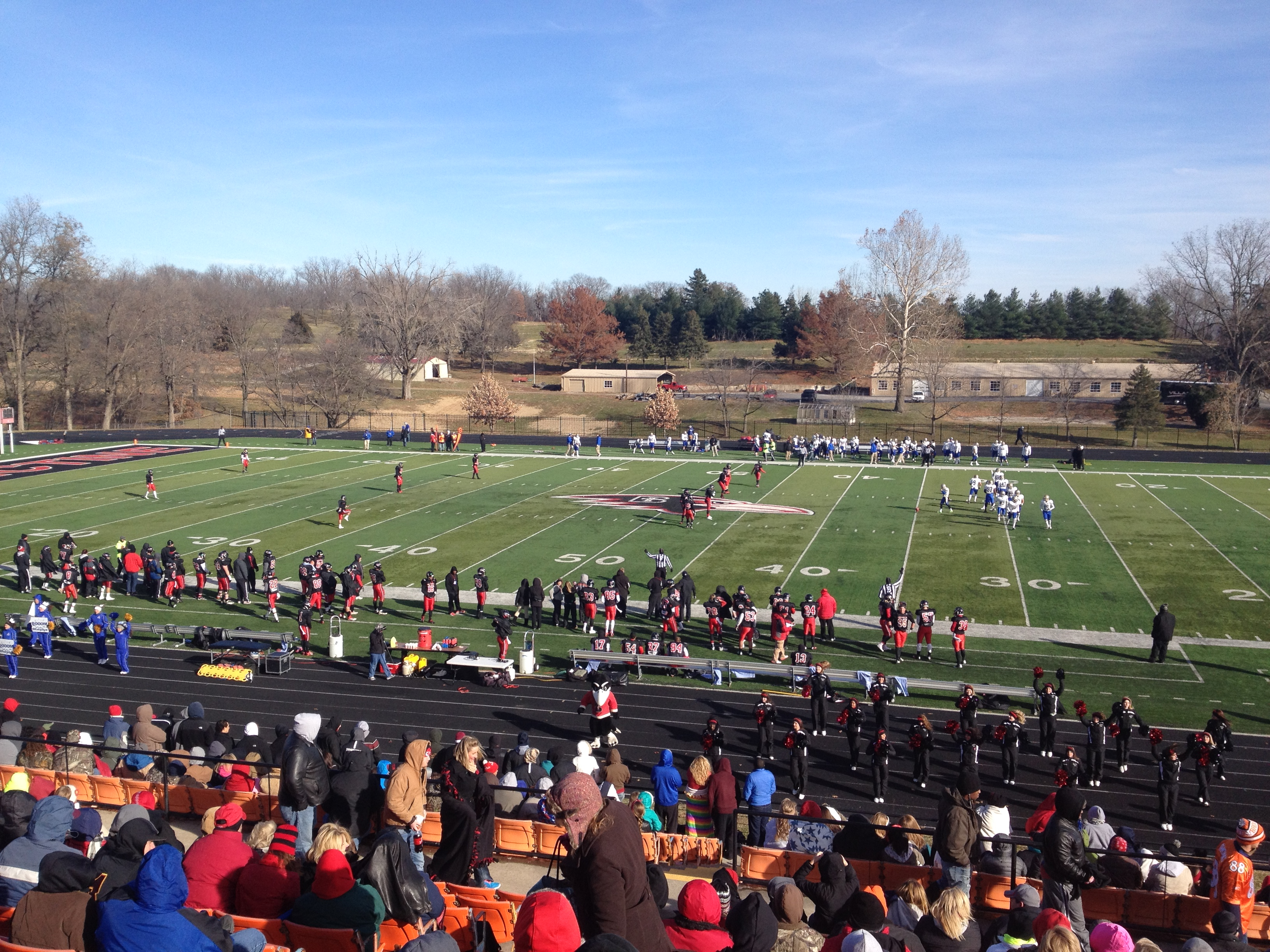
Larry Wilcox Stadium, Atchinson

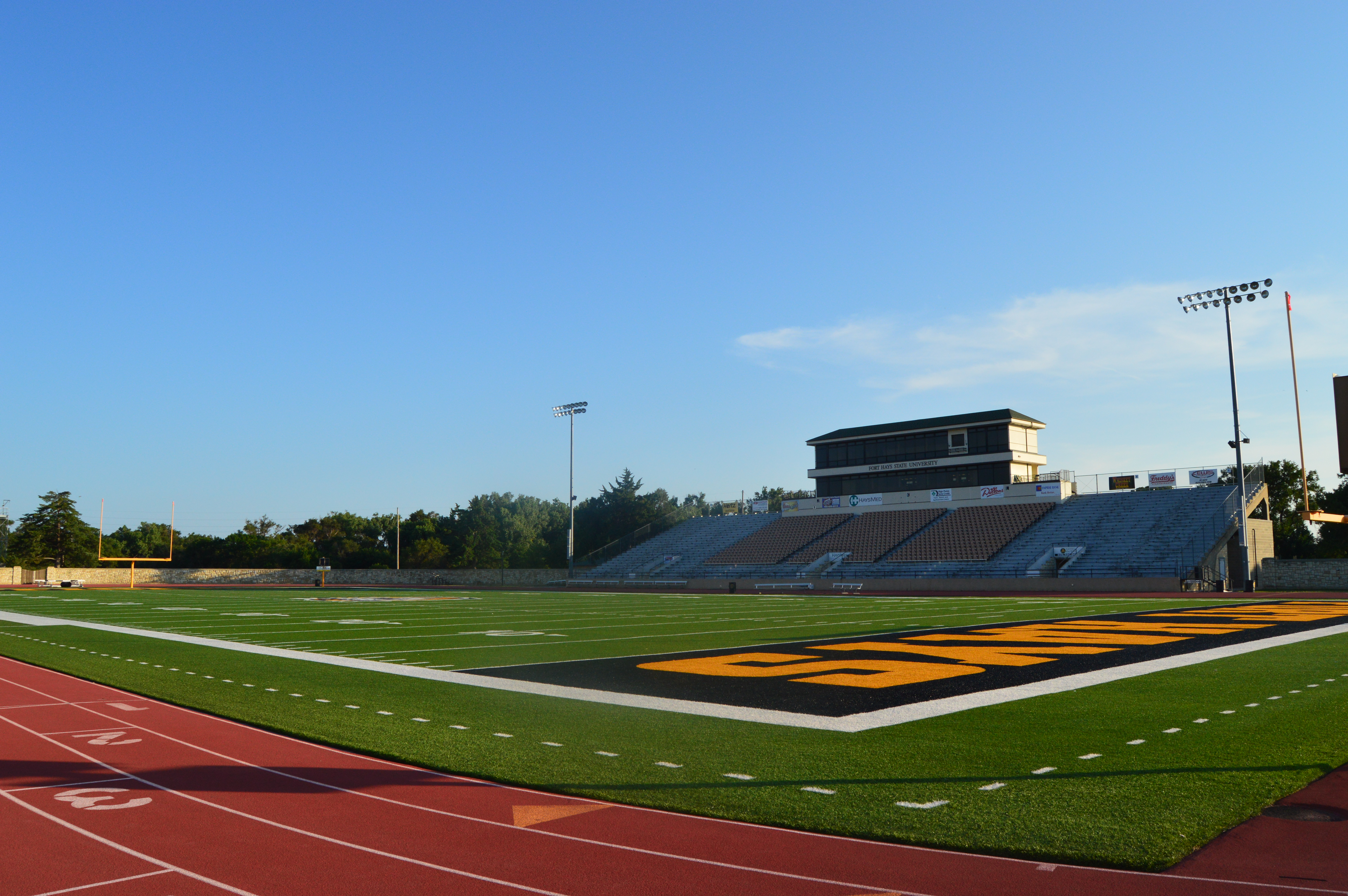
Lewis Field Stadium, Hays

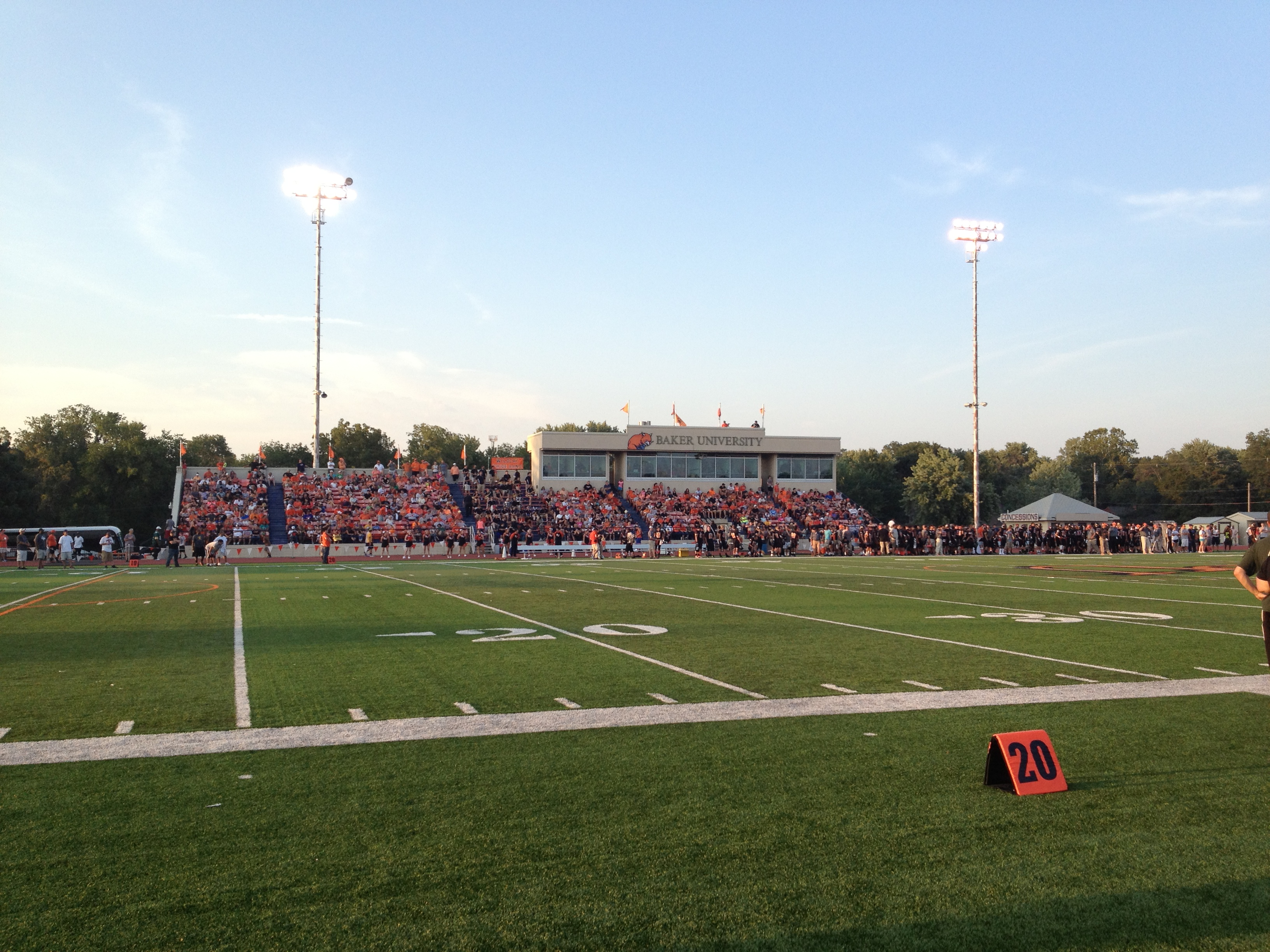
Liston Stadium, Baldwin

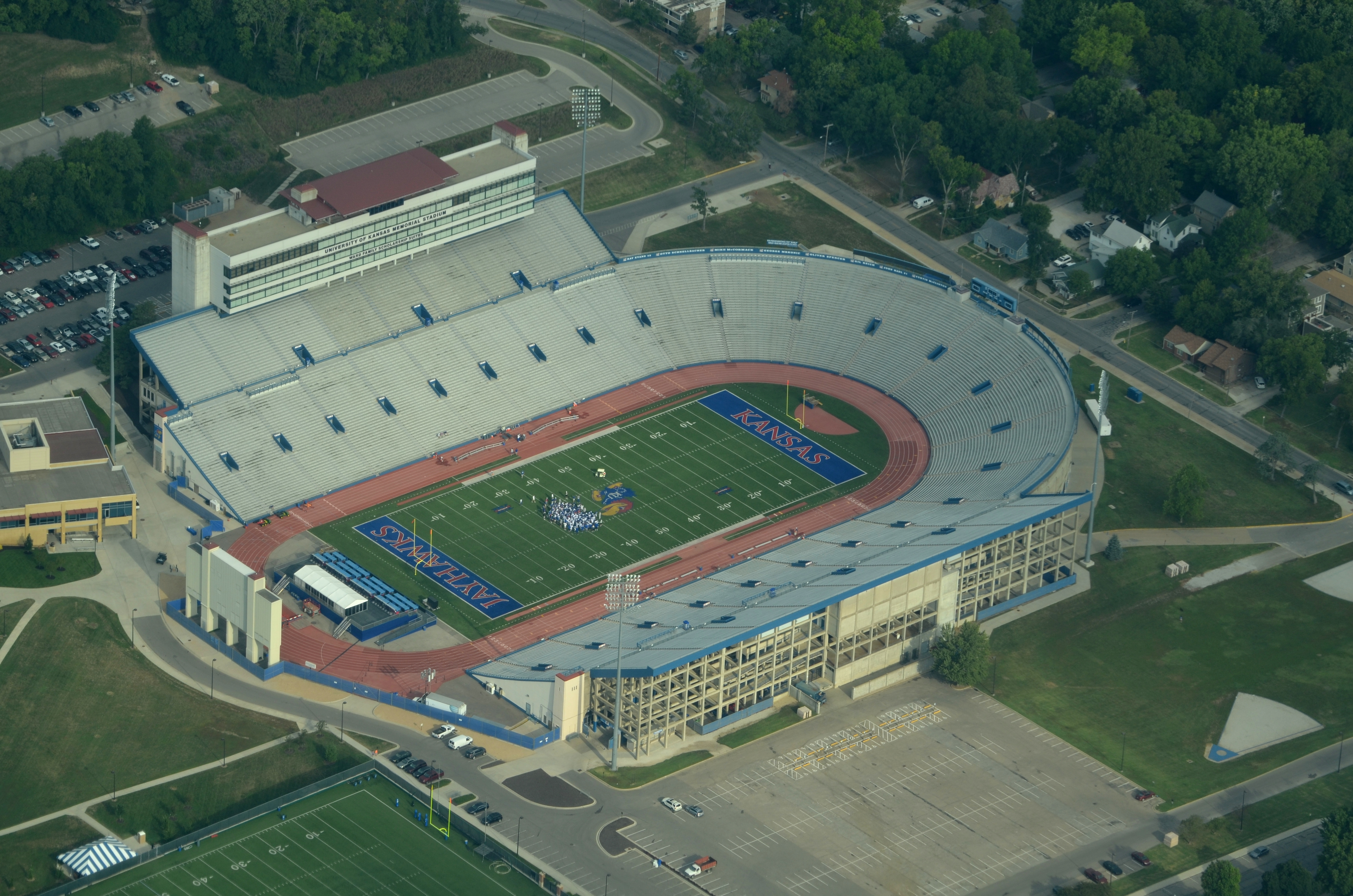
David Booth Kansas Memorial Stadium, Lawrence

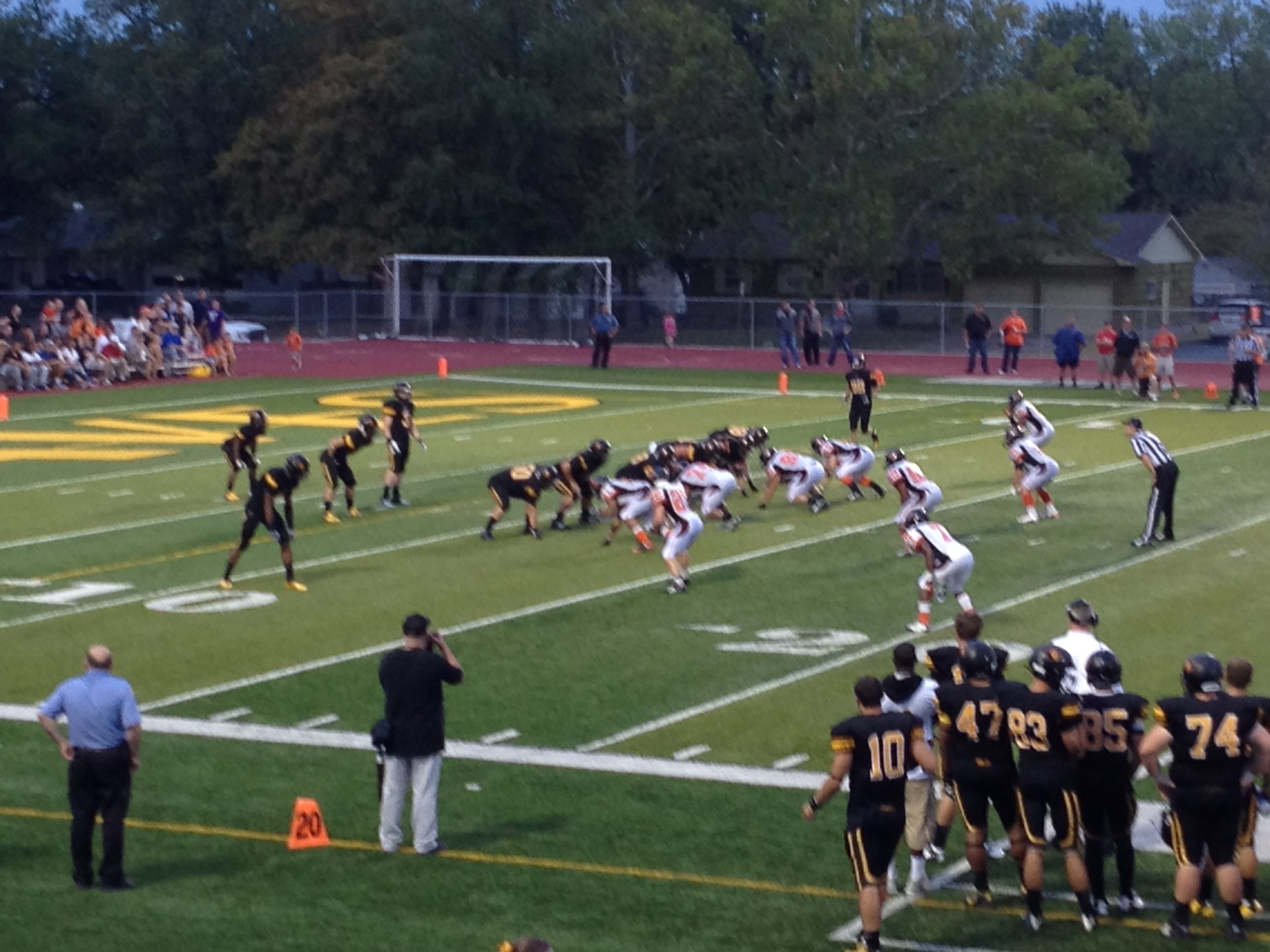
Peoples Bank Field, Ottawa

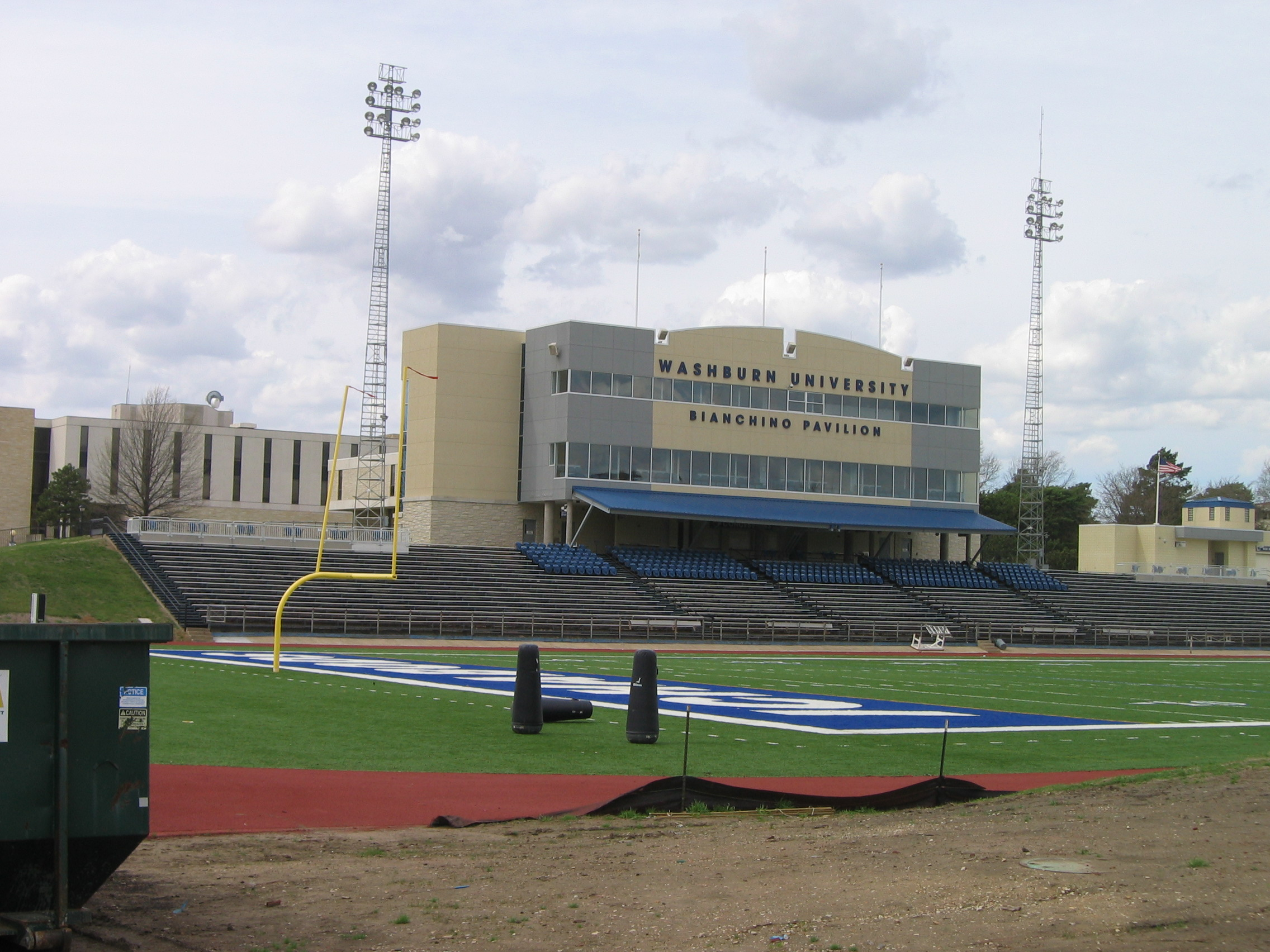
Yager Stadium at Moore Bowl, Topeka
