= William Monypenny =

William Monypenny may refer to:

- William Flavelle Monypenny (1866–1912), British journalist
- William Monypenny (American football), American football coach
