= Joe Bettasso =

American football player and coach

Current position
- Title: Defensive coordinator & linebackers coach
- Team: Missouri Southern
- Conference: MIAA

Playing career
- 2001–2004: Missouri Southern
- Position: Defensive back

Coaching career (HC unless noted)
- 2006: Missouri Southern (GA)
- 2007–2009: McPherson (DC/LB/DB/RC)
- 2010–2011: McPherson
- 2012: Quincy (IL) (DB)
- 2013–2014: Quincy (IL) (DC)
- 2015–2017: McKendree (DC/LB)
- 2018: Missouri Southern (DC)
- 2018: Missouri Southern (interim HC)
- 2019–present: Missouri Southern (DC/LB)

Head coaching record
- Overall: 15–15
- Tournaments: 0–1 (NAIA playoffs)

Accomplishments and honors

Championships
- 1 KCAC (2010)

Awards
- KCAC Coach of the Year (2010)

Joe Bettasso is an American college football coach and former player. He is the defensive coordinator and linebackers coach for Missouri Southern State University, positions he has held since 2019. Bettasso served as the interim head coach for 2018 and in 2021. Bettasso was formerly the defensive coordinator at McKendree University and, prior to that, Quincy University. Bettasso was the head football coach at McPherson College from 2010 to 2011, compiling a record of 14–8.

== Coaching career ==
Bettasso was the 27th head football coach at McPherson College in McPherson, Kansas and he held that position for the 2010 and 2011 seasons. His coaching record at McPherson was 14–8.

Following a 10–0 regular season in 2010, Bettasso's McPherson Bulldogs won the Kansas Collegiate Athletic Conference (KCAC) title and was seeded sixth in the 2010 NAIA Football National Championship. They suffered their first and only loss in the first round, losing to the 12th-ranked McKendree Bearcats. Bettasso was named conference coach of the year in 2010.

After completion of the 2011 season, he resigned to become the defensive backs coach at NCAA Division II Quincy University in Quincy, Illinois.

== Head coaching record ==
Year	Team	Overall	Conference	Standing	Bowl/playoffs	NAIA Coaches' Poll^{#}
McPherson Bulldogs (Kansas Collegiate Athletic Conference) (2010–2011)
2010	McPherson	10–1	9–0	1st	L NAIA First Round	11
2011	McPherson	4–7	4–5	7th		
McPherson:		14–8	13–5			
Missouri Southern Lions (Mid-America Intercollegiate Athletics Association) (2018)
2018	Missouri Southern	1–7	1–7	12th		
Missouri Southern:		1–7	1–7			
Total:		15–15				
National championship Conference title Conference division title or championship game berth
