= Kent Kessinger =

American football player and coach

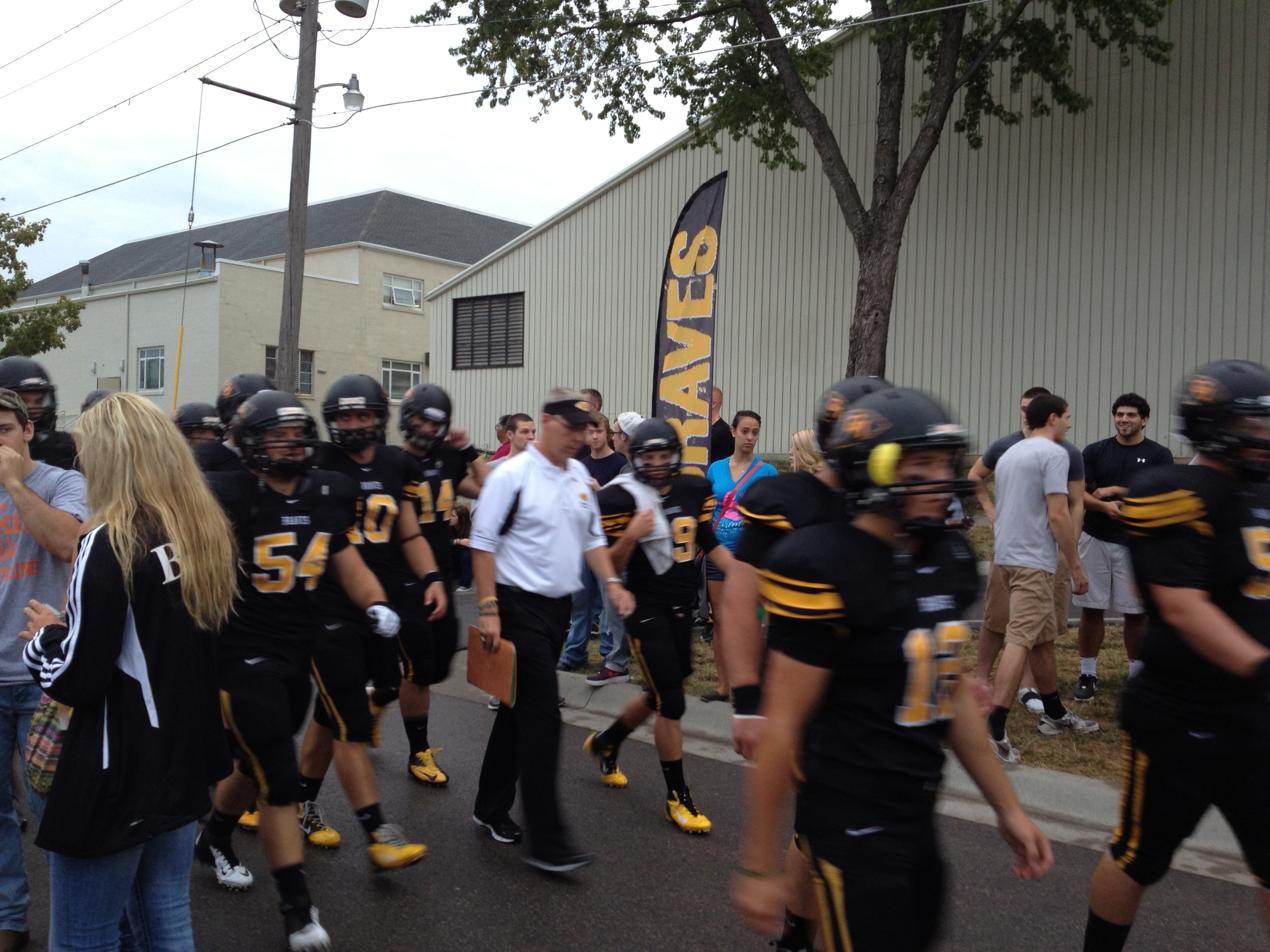
- Kessinger and his team preparing to take the field

Playing career
- 1988–1991: Bethany (KS)
- Position: Offensive lineman

Coaching career (HC unless noted)
- 1995–2003: Augustana (SD) (OC)
- 2004–2021: Ottawa (KS)

Head coaching record
- Overall: 108–85
- Tournaments: 1–6 (NAIA playoffs)

Accomplishments and honors

Championships
- 4 KCAC (2009, 2011–2012, 2014)

Awards
- 2× KCAC Coach of the Year (2009, 2011)

Kent Kessinger is an American retired college football coach. He was the head football coach at Ottawa University in Ottawa, Kansas, from 2004 to 2021, compiling a record of 108–85.

== Playing career ==
Kessinger is a graduate of Bethany College in Lindsborg, Kansas, where he played offensive line under his father, Ted Kessinger.

== Coaching career ==
Part of Kessinger's coaching style was to encourage athletes to participate in more than one sport. "It breaks up the year, it gives them something to compete with when they're in the offseason, and if they really love to play it, then we encourage them to keep on doing it," he said

== Head coaching record ==
Year	Team	Overall	Conference	Standing	Bowl/playoffs	NAIA^{#}
Ottawa Braves (Kansas Collegiate Athletic Conference) (2004–2021)
2004	Ottawa	3–7	3–6	T–8th		
2005	Ottawa	5–5	4–5	T–5th		
2006	Ottawa	1–9	1–8	10th		
2007	Ottawa	4–6	3–6	T–7th		
2008	Ottawa	8–2	7–2	T–2nd		22
2009	Ottawa	11–1	9–0	1st	L NAIA Quarterfinal	5
2010	Ottawa	9–2	8–1	2nd	L NAIA First Round	10
2011	Ottawa	9–3	9–0	1st	L NAIA First Round	10
2012	Ottawa	8–3	8–1	1st	L NAIA First Round	16
2013	Ottawa	8–4	7–2	T–2nd	L NAIA First Round	14
2014	Ottawa	9–3	8–1	1st	L NAIA First Round	13
2015	Ottawa	6–4	6–3	4th		
2016	Ottawa	4–7	4–5	5th		
2017	Ottawa	3–8	3–6	T–7th		
2018	Ottawa	8–2	8–2	2nd		
2019	Ottawa	2–8	2–8	10th		
2020–21	Ottawa	5–5	2–5	T–5th		
2021	Ottawa	5–6	4–6	7th		
Ottawa:		108–85	96–67			
Total:		108–85				
National championship Conference title Conference division title or championship game berth
^{#}Rankings from final NAIA Coaches' Poll.
