= William Monypenny (American football) =

American football and basketball coach and educator

Coaching career (HC unless noted)

Football
- 1926–1936: Southwestern (KS)

Basketball
- 1926–1929: Southwestern (KS)
- 1932–1937: Southwestern (KS)
- 1939–1943: Southwestern (KS)
- 1952–1953: Southwestern (KS)

Head coaching record
- Overall: 34–51–8 (football); 162–118 (basketball)

William Monypenny was an American college football and college basketball coach and educator.

== Coaching career ==
Monypenny was the seventh football coach at the Southwestern College in Winfield, Kansas, serving for 11 seasons, from 1926 to 1936, and compiling a record of 34–51–8.

Southwestern paid tribute to Monypenny by naming "Monypenny Track" inside Sonner Stadium, considered one of the finest NAIA facilities in the Midwest. Monypenny Track has been host to numerous invitational, collegiate championships, and high school championship meets.

== Political involvement ==
Monypenny's friendship with Kansas Governor Andrew Frank Schoeppel assisted in the expediting of Veterans benefits for Kansas soldiers returning home after World War II. Monypenny and Governor Schoeppel's friendship dated back to when the governor was the head football coach at Fort Hays State University.

== Head coaching record ==
=== Football ===
| Year | Team | Overall | Conference | Standing | Bowl/playoffs |
|---|---|---|---|---|---|
Southwestern Moundbuilders (Kansas Collegiate Athletic Conference) (1926–1927)
| 1926 | Southwestern | 2–6 | 0–6 | T–16th | |
| 1927 | Southwestern | 6–2 | 5–2 | T–5th | |
Southwestern Moundbuilders (Central Intercollegiate Conference) (1928–1936)
| 1928 | Southwestern | 4–3–2 | 3–1–2 | 3rd | |
| 1929 | Southwestern | 2–5–1 | 2–4 | T–5th | |
| 1930 | Southwestern | 2–5–1 | 1–4–1 | T–5th | |
| 1931 | Southwestern | 3–5–1 | 1–4–1 | T–5th | |
| 1932 | Southwestern | 3–4–2 | 1–3–2 | T–5th | |
| 1933 | Southwestern | 1–6–2 | 1–4–1 | 7th | |
| 1934 | Southwestern | 5–5 | 1–4 | 6th | |
| 1935 | Southwestern | 4–5 | 0–4 | 5th | |
| 1936 | Southwestern | 1–7 | 0–4 | 5th | |
| Southwestern: | | 34–51–8 | 15–40–7 | | |
| Total: | | 34–51–8 | | | |
