= Bethany Swedes =

Athletic teams

- University: Bethany College
- NAIA: Region IV
- Conference: Kansas Collegiate Athletic Conference
- Athletic director: Laura Moreno
- Location: Lindsborg, Kansas
- Varsity teams: 22
- Football stadium: Lindstrom Field (2,500)
- Basketball arena: Ray D. Hahn Gym (1,500)
- Baseball stadium: Philip Anderson Baseball Field (2,500)
- Nickname: Swedes
- Colors: Blue and gold
- Website: www.bethanyswedes.com
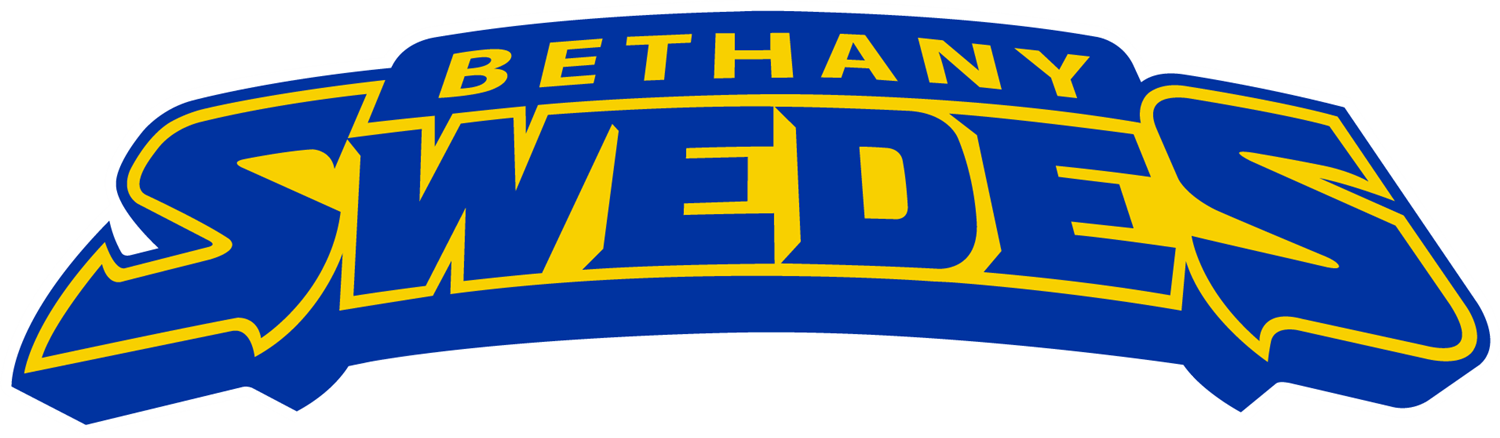

The Bethany Swedes (historically the Bethany Terrible Swedes) are the athletic teams that represent Bethany College, located in Lindsborg, Kansas, in intercollegiate sports as a member of the National Association of Intercollegiate Athletics (NAIA), primarily competing in the Kansas Collegiate Athletic Conference (KCAC) since the 1902–03 academic year.

== Varsity teams ==
Bethany competes in 18 intercollegiate varsity sports:

Men's sports	Women's sports
Baseball	Basketball
Basketball	Cross country
Cross country	Golf
Football	Soccer
Golf	Softball
Soccer	Tennis
Tennis	Track and field^{1}
Track and field^{1}	Volleyball
Wrestling	
Co-ed sports
Esports (Note: Gaming competitions such as Call of Duty, League of Legends, Overwatch, Rocket League, and Valorant.)
^{1} – includes both indoor and outdoor

=== Football ===
Former coach Ted Kessinger was named to the College Football Hall of Fame in 2010 and former coach Bennie Owen was inducted in 1951.

=== Tennis (men's) ===
Despite having a school population under 1,000, the Bethany men's tennis team has received national recognition. Bethany men's tennis team won 52 Kansas Collegiate Athletic Conference championships, including a streak of 26 KCAC titles in a row. The Bethany College men won 97 straight KCAC matches in a row under head coach Vic Bateman, undefeated in 11 straight years of KCAC Conference play. Under Bateman the men's tennis team reached the Elite 8 at the NAIA nationals and was ranked one of the top tennis programs in the country.
