= Dave Dallas =

American football player and coach

Playing career
- 1979–1982: Missouri Western

Coaching career (HC unless noted)
- 1983–1984: Missouri Western (GA)
- 1985: Northeast Missouri State (assistant)
- 1986: Rolla HS (MO)
- 1987–1988: Graceland
- 1989–1996: Ottawa (KS)
- 1997–2013: Kansas Wesleyan
- 2014–2016: North County HS (MO)

Head coaching record
- Overall: 132–119–1 (college)
- Bowls: 0–2
- Tournaments: 0–2 (NAIA playoffs)

Accomplishments and honors

Championships
- 2 KCAC (2001–2002)

Dave Dallas is an American football coach and former player. He was the head football coach at Kansas Wesleyan University until he resigned after completion of the 2013 season. From 1989 to 1996, Dallas was the head football coach at Ottawa University. From 2014 to 2016 he was the head coach at North County High School in Bonne Terre, Missouri.

== Playing career ==
Dallas played college football at Missouri Western in St. Joseph, Missouri, from 1979 until 1982. After playing, he continued to work with the Griffons as a graduate assistant in the football program.

== Coaching career ==
=== Ottawa (KS) ===
Dallas served as the head football coach at Ottawa University in Ottawa, Kansas for eight seasons, from 1989 to 1996.

=== Kansas Wesleyan ===
After coaching at Ottawa, Dallas became the 19th head football coach at the Kansas Wesleyan University in Salina, Kansas. He held that position for 17 seasons from 1997 until his resignation in 2013.

In 2000, he coached the Coyotes in the American Family Charity Bowl against conference rival Bethany, losing 20–3. His 2001 team was declared Kansas Collegiate Athletic Conference co-champions and then the team won the title outright in 2002. For both the 2001 and 2002 seasons, Kansas Wesleyan qualified for the NAIA Football National Championship playoffs.

== Head coaching record ==
=== College ===
Year	Team	Overall	Conference	Standing	Bowl/playoffs	NAIA^{#}
Ottawa Braves (Kansas Collegiate Athletic Conference) (1989–1996)
1989	Ottawa	3–7	3–6	7th		
1990	Ottawa	5–5	5–4	T–5th		
1991	Ottawa	5–5	5–4	T–4th		
1992	Ottawa	5–3–1	5–3	T–3rd		
1993	Ottawa	6–4	5–3	3rd		
1994	Ottawa	5–5	5–3	T–4th		
1995	Ottawa	7–3	6–2	2nd	L Wheat	
1996	Ottawa	1–8	1–7	8th		
Ottawa:		37–40–1	35–32			
Kansas Wesleyan Coyotes (Kansas Collegiate Athletic Conference) (1997–present)
1997	Kansas Wesleyan	2–7	2–6	T–7th		
1998	Kansas Wesleyan	5–4	4–4	T–4th		
1999	Kansas Wesleyan	2–7	2–6	T–7th		
2000	Kansas Wesleyan	7–4	6–3	T–3rd	L American Family Charity Bowl	T–24
2001	Kansas Wesleyan	8–3	8–1	T–1st	L NAIA First Round	17
2002	Kansas Wesleyan	8–3	8–1	1st	L NAIA First Round	18
2003	Kansas Wesleyan	4–6	4–5	T–6th		
2004	Kansas Wesleyan	5–5	5–4	T–2nd		
2005	Kansas Wesleyan	8–2	7–2	2nd		20
2006	Kansas Wesleyan	8–2	7–2	T–3rd		20
2007	Kansas Wesleyan	5–5	4–5	T–5th		
2008	Kansas Wesleyan	6–4	5–4	T–4th		
2009	Kansas Wesleyan	5–5	4–5	5th		
2010	Kansas Wesleyan	7–3	6–3	3rd		20
2011	Kansas Wesleyan	5–7	5–4	T–4th		
2012	Kansas Wesleyan	6–5	6–3	3rd		
2013	Kansas Wesleyan	4–7	3–6	T–7th		
Kansas Wesleyan:		95–79	86–64			
Total:		132–119–1				
National championship Conference title Conference division title or championship game berth
^{#}Final rankings from NAIA Coaches' Poll.
