= Ted Kessinger =

American football coach (born 1941)

Biographical details
- Born: January 15, 1941 (age 85); Sioux Falls, South Dakota, U.S.

Playing career

Football
- c. 1962: Augustana (SD)
- Positions: Center, linebacker

Coaching career (HC unless noted)

Football
- 1964–1968: Augustana (IL) (line)
- 1969–1975: Augustana (SD) (assistant)
- 1976–2003: Bethany (KS)

Wrestling
- 1964–1969: Augustana (IL)

Head coaching record
- Overall: 219–57–1 (football); 39–5–3 (wrestling)
- Tournaments: Football; 3–9 (NAIA D-II playoffs); 0–1 (NAIA playoffs)

Accomplishments and honors

Championships
- Football; 16 KCAC (1977–1981, 1986–1988, 1990–1991, 1993–1996, 1999, 2001) Wrestling; 5 CCIW (1965–1969)

Awards
- 11× KCAC Coach of the Year; NAIA Hall of Fame (2003); Kansas Sports Hall of Fame (2005)
- College Football Hall of Fame; Inducted in 2010 (profile)

Ted Kessinger (born January 15, 1941) is an American former college football coach. He served as the head football coach at Bethany College in Lindsborg, Kansas from 1976 to 2003, compiling a record of 219–57–1 for a winning percentage of .792. He is among the college football coaches with the most wins and the highest winning percentage.

Kessinger was the head coach of the first American football team to play in Sweden, and he was elected to the College Football Hall of Fame in 2010. His son, Kent Kessinger, was the head coach at Ottawa University from 2004 to 2021.

== Coaching career ==
=== Assistant coaching ===
Before becoming a head coach, Kessinger worked as an assistant coach at Augustana College—now known as Augustana University—in Sioux Falls, South Dakota and the University of South Dakota in Vermillion.

=== Bethany ===
Kessinger was the head football coach at Bethany College in Lindsborg, Kansas from 1976 to 2003, where he posted a record of 219–57–1. He guided Bethany to the NAIA playoffs ten times and achieved a top 25 ranking 20 times. His teams never posted a losing season during his entire coaching tenure.

In 2000, his team won the American Family Charity Bowl, defeating the Kansas Wesleyan Coyotes by a score of 20–3.

Kessinger was inducted into the NAIA Hall of Fame in 2003 as well as the Kansas Sports Hall of Fame in 2005.

== Head coaching record ==
=== Football ===
Year	Team	Overall	Conference	Standing	Bowl/playoffs	NAIA^{#}
Bethany Terrible Swedes (Kansas Collegiate Athletic Conference) (1976–2003)
1976	Bethany	6–4	5–3	T–3rd		
1977	Bethany	9–1	8–0	1st		
1978	Bethany	10–1	8–0	1st	L NAIA Division II Quarterfinal	
1979	Bethany	11–1	8–0	1st	L NAIA Division II Semifinal	
1980	Bethany	9–1	7–1	1st		
1981	Bethany	9–1	8–0	1st		
1982	Bethany	5–5	5–4	T–4th		
1983	Bethany	8–2	7–2	2nd		
1984	Bethany	6–4	5–4	T–4th		
1985	Bethany	7–2	7–2	T–2nd		
1986	Bethany	8–1	8–1	1st		
1987	Bethany	8–2	8–1	1st	L NAIA Division II First Round	
1988	Bethany	10–1	9–0	1st	L NAIA Division II Quarterfinal	
1989	Bethany	8–1	8–1	2nd		
1990	Bethany	8–2	8–1	1st	L NAIA Division II First Round	
1991	Bethany	8–2	8–1	1st	L NAIA Division II First Round	
1992	Bethany	7–1–1	7–1	2nd		
1993	Bethany	9–2	8–0	1st	L NAIA Division II First Round	
1994	Bethany	7–3	7–1	T–1st		
1995	Bethany	10–1	8–0	1st	L NAIA Division II Quarterfinal	
1996	Bethany	8–2	8–0	1st	L NAIA Division II First Round	
1997	Bethany	7–2	6–2	3rd		
1998	Bethany	6–3	5–3	3rd		
1999	Bethany	8–2	7–1	T–1st	L NAIA First Round	13
2000	Bethany	7–3	6–3	T–3rd	W American Family Charity Bowl	
2001	Bethany	8–1	8–1	T–1st		19
2002	Bethany	6–3	6–3	2nd		
2003	Bethany	5–4	5–4	T–3rd		
Bethany:		219–57–1	198–40			
Total:		219–57–1				
National championship Conference title Conference division title or championship game berth

== See also ==
- List of college football career coaching wins leaders
