= Ken Crandall =

American football player and coach (born 1967)

Biographical details
- Born: November 6, 1967 (age 58)

Playing career
- 1987–1990: Fort Hays State

Coaching career (HC unless noted)
- 1991: Pittsburg State (GA)
- 1992–1993: Maine Maritime (assistant)
- 1994–1995: Norwich (OC)
- 1996–1997: Minnesota–Morris (OC)
- 1998–2006: Minnesota–Morris
- 2007–2014: Southwestern (KS)

Head coaching record
- Overall: 47–132

Accomplishments and honors

Championships
- 1 UMAC (2006)

Awards
- UMAC Coach of the Year (2006); UMAC North Division Coach of the Year (2006)

Ken Crandall (born November 6, 1967) is an American football coach and former player. He was most recently the head football coach for the Southwestern College Moundbuilders in Winfield, Kansas and was the 28th person to hold that position. Prior to accepting this position, he was the head coach for nine years at the University of Minnesota Morris. Crandall had been a graduate assistant coach at Pittsburg State University during the Gorillas' national championship run in 1991. In addition, he was assistant coach at Norwich University and at the Maine Maritime Academy. Crandall resigned the position at Southwestern on November 19, 2014.

== Playing career ==
Crandall played college football at Fort Hays State University in Hays, Kansas.

== Coaching career ==
=== Minnesota Morris ===
While at the University of Minnesota Morris, Crandall was named the 2006 UMAC North Division and Conference Coach of the Year. He led the Cougars to their first-ever Upper Midwest Athletic Conference championship with a thrilling 27–20 come from behind overtime win over Rockford College at the Hubert H. Humphrey Metrodome in Minneapolis.

Crandall established a record of 22 wins and 73 losses as a head coach in nine seasons but did build the program to a winning program. In his last four seasons, Crandall produced a record of 21 wins and 20 losses. With 21 wins, Crandall is one of the “winningest” head coaches at UMM exceeded only by former head Cougar football coaches Al Molde (51–19–1) and Mike Simpson (29–13–1).

=== Southwestern ===
In 2007, his first year coaching at Southwestern, Crandall led the moundbuilders to a record of 4 wins and 5 losses (4–4 conference), ending the season #5 in the Kansas Collegiate Athletic Conference. This showed an improvement from the 2 wins and 8 losses and finishing 9th in the conference the previous year. He resigned from Southwestern after the conclusion of a 1–10 season (1–8 in conference play) which included a 27–6 homecoming victory over the then-ranked #3 Tabor Bluejays.

=== Awards ===
Crandall was awarded Upper Midwest Athletic Conference North Division Coach of the Year and Conference Coach of the Year for 2006.

== Head coaching record ==
Year	Team	Overall	Conference	Standing	Bowl/playoffs
Minnesota–Morris Cougars (Northern Sun Intercollegiate Conference) (1998–2002)
1998	Minnesota–Morris	1–9	0–6	7th	
1999	Minnesota–Morris	0–11	0–8	10th	
2000	Minnesota–Morris	0–11	0–8	10th	
2001	Minnesota–Morris	0–11	0–9	10th	
2002	Minnesota–Morris	0–11	0–9	10th	
Minnesota–Morris Cougars (Upper Midwest Athletic Conference) (2003–2006)
2003	Minnesota–Morris	5–6			
2004	Minnesota–Morris	5–5			
2005	Minnesota–Morris	4–6	4–3	5th	
2006	Minnesota–Morris	7–3	7–0	1st	
Minnesota–Morris:		22–73			
Southwestern Moundbuilders (Kansas Collegiate Athletic Conference) (2007–2014)
2007	Southwestern	4–6	4–5	T–5th	
2008	Southwestern	1–9	1–8	10th	
2009	Southwestern	3–7	3–6	T–6th	
2010	Southwestern	2–8	2–7	T–8th	
2011	Southwestern	5–6	4–5	T–6th	
2012	Southwestern	4–7	3–6	T–7th	
2013	Southwestern	5–6	4–5	T–5th	
2014	Southwestern	1–10	1–8	10th	
Southwestern:		25–59	22–50		
Total:		47–132			
National championship Conference title Conference division title or championship game berth
