= Lindstrom Field =

Stadium in Kansas, U.S.

- Interactive map of Lindstrom Field
- Former names: Anderson Field
- Location: Lindsborg, Kansas
- Coordinates: 38°34′57″N 97°40′15″W
- Owner: Bethany College
- Operator: Bethany College
- Capacity: 2,500
- Surface: Artificial turf

Construction
- Opened: 2008 (major renovation)
- Cost: $5.5 million

Tenant
- Bethany College Swedes

Lindstrom Field (full name Clyde & Glenn Lindstrom Field) is a sport stadium in Lindsborg, Kansas, United States. The facility is primarily used by Bethany College for college football and men's and women's soccer teams. The stadium is also used for local school (US$400, Smoky Valley Public Schools) and other community events.
