= McPherson Stadium =

Sports Stadium in Kansas

Coordinates: 38°22′26″N 97°38′34″W

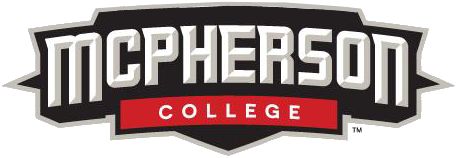
- Interactive map of McPherson Stadium
- Full name: McPherson Stadium – Paul Family Field
- Address: McPherson, KS; United States
- Owner: McPherson College
- Operator: McPherson College Athletics
- Capacity: 4,000
- Type: Soccer-specific stadium
- Surface: Artificial turf
- Current use: Football; Soccer; Track and field

Construction
- Opened: 1950; 76 years ago
- Cost: $1.9 million (2003 renovation cost)
- Architects: Wilson & Company (Salina, Kansas)

Tenants
- McPherson Bulldogs football, soccer, track and field

Website
- {{URL|example.com|optional display text}}

McPherson Stadium – Paul Family Field is a stadium located on the campus of McPherson College in McPherson, Kansas. Opened in 1950, the facility is the home venue to the McPherson Bulldogs football, soccer, and track and field teams.

The stadium is also used for McPherson USD 418 (the local high school) sporting events and other community events.

== History ==
=== 2003 renovation ===
The stadium underwent extensive renovations in 2003 along with several other athletic and campus facilities. The new stadium and facilities have been credited with playing a part of improving the football program at the college.
