= Thresher Stadium =

Stadium in North Newton, Kansas, US

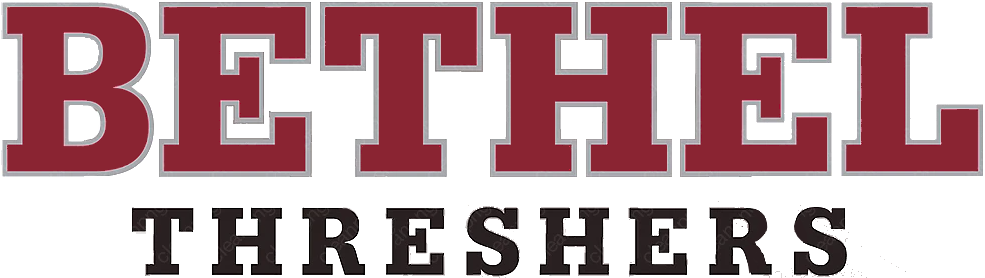
- Interactive map of Thresher Stadium
- Address: North Newton, KS; United States
- Coordinates: 38°04′41″N 97°20′38″W
- Owner: Bethel College
- Operator: Bethel College Athletics
- Capacity: 2,500
- Type: Stadium
- Surface: Artificial turf
- Current use: Football; Soccer

Construction
- Cost: $5.5 million

Tenants
- Bethel College Threshers teams: football, soccer

Website
- bethelthreshers.com/thresher-stadium

Thresher Stadium is a stadium located on the campus of Bethel College in North Newton, Kansas, United States.

The facility is primarily used by the Bethel Threshers football and soccer teams. The stadium is also used for local high school and other community events.
