= Salina Stadium =

Sport stadium in Salina, Kansas

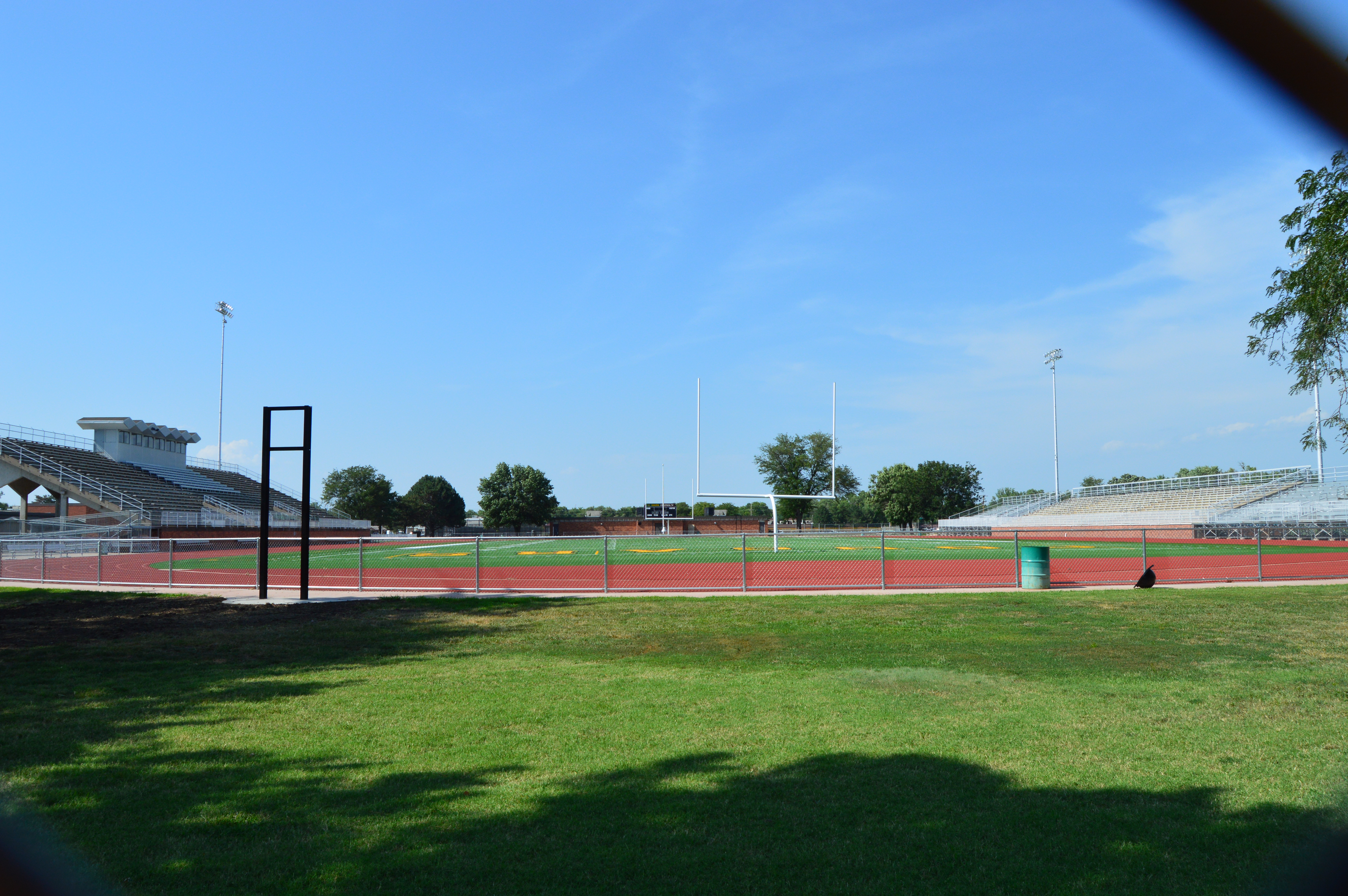
- Interactive map of Salina Stadium
- Location: Salina, Kansas
- Coordinates: 38°48′48″N 97°36′22″W
- Owner: Salina Unified School District 305
- Operator: Salina Unified School District 305
- Capacity: 7,000
- Surface: Field turf

Construction
- Opened: 1965
- Renovated: 2017

Tenants
- Kansas Wesleyan University Coyotes; Unified School District 305

Salina Stadium is a sport stadium in Salina, Kansas. It is located on the campus of Salina High School Central. It is home to both Salina High School Central and Salina High School South's football, soccer, and track and field teams.

The Kansas Wesleyan University Coyotes football, soccer, and track and field programs used the facility as well while their on-campus stadium underwent an extensive renovation, but their use ended officially on October 3, 2015, with the opening of the Graves Family Sports Complex. The stadium is also used for other community events.
