= Richard L. Jantz Stadium =

Sport stadium in Winfield, Kansas

Coordinates: 37.249546°N 96.974441°W

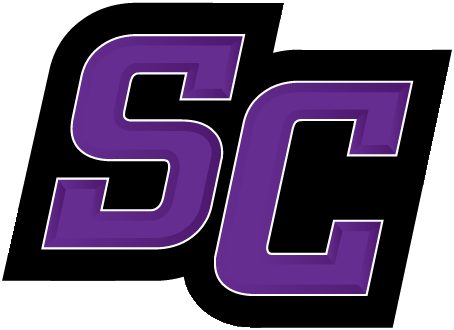
- Interactive map of Richard L. Jantz Stadium
- Former names: Sonner Stadium
- Address: Winfield, KS; United States
- Owner: Southwestern College
- Operator: Southwestern College Athletics
- Capacity: 4,000
- Type: Stadium
- Surface: Grass
- Current use: Football; Soccer; Track and field

Construction
- Groundbreaking: 2009
- Opened: 2010; 16 years ago
- Cost: $4 Million (U.S.)

Tenants
- Southwestern Moundbuilders teams: football, soccer, track and field

Richard L. Jantz Stadium (formerly Sonner Stadium) is a sport stadium in Winfield, Kansas, United States. The facility is primarily used by the Southwestern Moundbuilders football, soccer, and track and field teams.

The grass field is named "Art Kahler Field" from prominent Southwestern alum Art Kahler and the surrounding track is named "Monypenny Track" in honor of alum William Monypenny.

== Sunflower Bowl ==
The facility hosted the Sunflower Bowl during the bowl's entire operation, from 1982 to 1986. The stadium is also used for local high school sporting events and other community events.

== Rebuilding ==
In January 2009, the school announced plans for a major renovation, including changing the name from "Sonner Stadium" to "Richard L. Jantz Stadium". The renovations are expected to attract better student-athletes and bigger events to Winfield. The final Southwestern football game was played before the renovations on November 7, 2009, with a victory over Tabor.
