= Adair–Austin Stadium =

Sport stadium in Wichita, Kansas

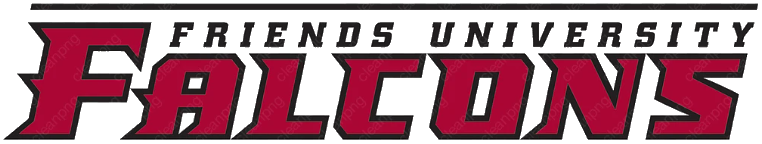

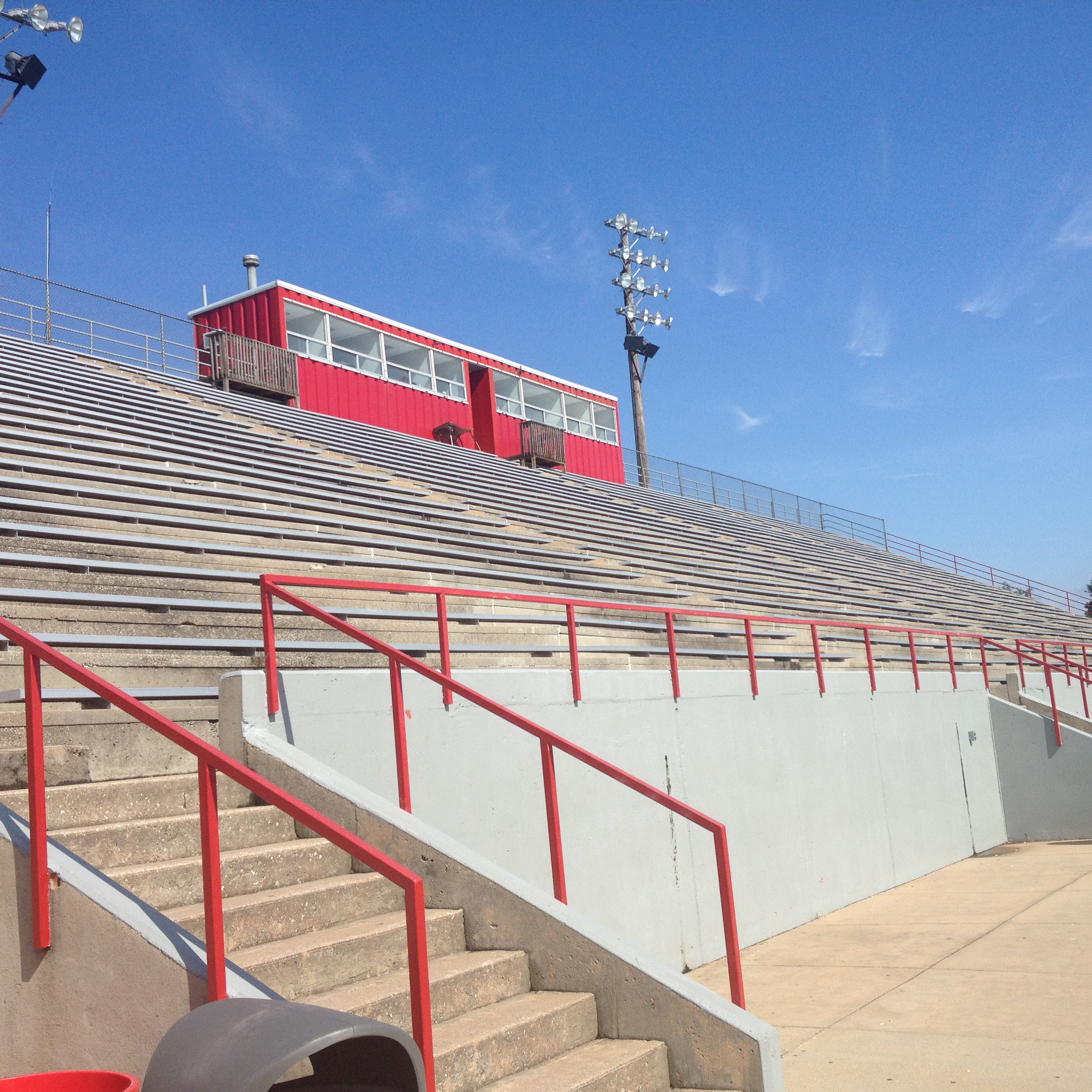
- View of the stadium's stands in 2014
- Interactive map of Adair–Austin Stadium
- Address: Wichita, KS; United States
- Coordinates: 37°40′42″N 97°22′07″W
- Owner: Friends University
- Operator: Friends University Athletics
- Capacity: 5,000
- Type: Stadium
- Surface: Sportexe Momentum 46
- Current use: Football; Soccer; Track and field

Tenants
- Friends University Falcons teams: football, soccer, track and field

Website
- friendsathletics.com/adair-austin-stadium

Adair–Austin Stadium is a stadium located on the campus of Friends University in Wichita, Kansas. The facility is primarily used by the Friends University Falcons football, soccer, and track and field teams. The stadium is also used for other community events.
