= Saint Mary Field =

Sport stadium in Leavenworth, Kansas

Coordinates: 39°16′51″N 94°54′30″W

Charles Berkel Memorial Stadium
- Berkel Stadium
- Interactive map of Charles Berkel Memorial Stadium
- Location: Leavenworth, Kansas
- Owner: University of Saint Mary
- Operator: University of Saint Mary
- Capacity: 2,500

Construction
- Groundbreaking: April 17, 2015
- Opened: October 21, 2017

Tenant
- Saint Mary Spires

Charles J Berkel Memorial Stadium (Saint Mary Field, Berkel Stadium) is a sport stadium in Leavenworth, Kansas. The facility is primarily used by the Saint Mary Spires football, soccer, and track and field teams. The stadium is also used by several local high schools and for other community events.
