= 2010 NAIA football national championship =

2010 Russell Athletic NAIA Football National Championship
Carroll Fighting Saints	Sioux Falls Cougars
(13–0)	(13–0)
10	7
Head coach: Mike Van Diest	Head coach: Jed Stugart
Coaches 2	Coaches 1
	1	2	3	4	Total
Carroll	0	7	0	3	10
Sioux Falls	0	7	0	0	7
- Date: December 18, 2010
- Season: 2010
- Stadium: Barron Stadium
- Location: Rome, Georgia
- MVP: Gary Wagner, Carroll (Offense); Eric Anderson, Sioux Falls (Defense)
- Referee: Les Anderson; Scott Richardson; Jim Scifres; Jim Rogers; Gary Schildmeyer; Brett Henninger; Kirt Shay
- Attendance: 6,000

United States TV coverage
- Network: CBS College Sports Network

The 2010 NAIA football national championship was played on December 18, 2010, as the 55th Annual Russell Athletic NAIA Football National Championship.

The championship game was played at Barron Stadium in Rome, Georgia. The Carroll Fighting Saints won the championship over the Sioux Falls Cougars by a score of 10–7. With their 6th championship, Carroll moved to within one of the all-time NAIA records of seven held by Texas A&I. The win also snapped Sioux Falls' 42-game winning streak; their last loss was at Carroll's hands in the 2007 NAIA championship game.

Sixteen teams from across the United States participated in a single-elimination tournament.

== Scoring Summary ==
Scoring summary

Quarter	Time	Drive			Team	Scoring information	Score	
Quarter	Time	Plays	Yards	TOP	Team	Scoring information	Carroll Fighting Saints	Sioux Falls Cougars
2	8:47	3	84	0:58	Carroll Fighting Saints	Gary Wagner 83-yard touchdown run, Tom Yaremko kick Good	7	0
2	3:02	11	63	5:45	Sioux Falls Cougars	Jordan Taylor 1-yard touchdown run, Braden Wieking kick Good	7	7
4	7:47	15	53	7:15	Carroll Fighting Saints	22-yard field goal by Tom Yaremko	10	7
"TOP" = time of possession. For other American football terms, see Glossary of American football.							Carroll Fighting Saints	Sioux Falls Cougars

== Tournament bracket ==
1st round November 20
1	Sioux Falls (SD) (10–0)	33
16	Northwestern Oklahoma State (8–2)	14
6	McPherson (KS) (10–0)	14
12	McKendree (IL) (8–2)	38
4	MidAmerica Nazarene (10–0)	27
17	Georgetown (KY) (8–2)	24
7	Morningside (IA) (9–1)	38
9	Dickinson State (9–1)	17
2	Carroll (MT) (10–0)	35
18	Azusa Pacific (6–3)	21
8	Ottawa (KS) (9–1)	20
11	Marian (IN) (9–2)	35
3	Saint Xavier (IL) (11–0)	66
20	Cumberlands (KY) (7–3)	19
5	Lindenwood (MO) (9–1)	38
10	Saint Francis (IN) (9–1)	46

Quarterfinals; November 27
1	Sioux Falls (SD)	27
12	McKendree (IL)	7
4	MidAmerica Nazarene	34
7	Morningside (IA)	10
2	Carroll (MT)	38
11	Marian (IN)	6
3	Saint Xavier (IL)	40
10	Saint Francis (IN)	21

Semifinals; December 4
1	Sioux Falls (SD)	38
4	MidAmerica Nazarene	0
2	Carroll (MT)	27
3	Saint Xavier (IL)	5

Championship; December 18
1	Sioux Falls (SD)	7
2	Carroll (MT)	10

- * denotes OT.

== Game details ==
=== First round ===
==== #11 Marian at No. 8 Ottawa ====
	1	2	3	4	Total
#11 Marian	7	7	14	7	35
#8 Ottawa	7	13	0	0	20

Ottawa completed its worst game on offense in terms of total yards for the season, only coming up with 246. Ottawa did manage to take the lead twice, but in the third quarter Marian would take the lead for good.

Defensively, Ottawa's Eric Wilson returned a 98-yard interception for a touchdown but the final score would fall 15 points short to end at 35–20.

==== #12 McKendree at No. 6 McPherson ====
	1	2	3	4	Total
#12 McKendree	14	7	10	7	38
#6 McPherson	7	0	7	0	14

McKendree took off to a 14 point lead in the first quarter and maintained the lead for the remainder of the game, dumping McPherson for their second first-round playoff loss in two years. It was the first loss for McPherson in the season, which ended with a final record of 10–1.

McKendree scored five touchdowns and claimed victory in the end with a final score of 38–14.
