= 2011 Kansas Collegiate Athletic Conference football season =

- League: NAIA
- Sport: football
- Duration: Fall-Winter 2011
- Teams: 10

2011
- Conference Champion: Ottawa Braves
- Runners-up: Saint Mary Spires
- Season MVP: Clarence Anderson

Football seasons
- 2010 2012

2011 Kansas Collegiate Athletic Conference football standings
	Conf.			Overall
Team	W		L	W		L
No. 11 Ottawa $^	9	–	0	9	–	2
Saint Mary (KS)	7	–	2	7	–	4
Bethany (KS)	6	–	3	8	–	3
Friends	5	–	4	5	–	5
Kansas Wesleyan	5	–	4	5	–	6
Southwestern (KS)	4	–	5	5	–	6
McPherson	4	–	5	4	–	7
Tabor	2	–	7	3	–	7
Bethel (KS)	2	–	7	2	–	9
Sterling	1	–	8	1	–	10
$ – Conference champion; ^ – NAIA playoff participant; Rankings from NAIA Coaches' Poll

The 2011 Kansas Collegiate Athletic Conference football season is made up of 10 college athletic programs that compete in the Kansas Collegiate Athletic Conference (KCAC) under the National Association of Intercollegiate Athletics (NAIA) for the 2011 college football season.

The season began play on August 27 when the Sterling Warriors played William Jewell, followed by the Victory Sports Network College Fanz First Down Classic.

The regular season ended play on November 12, 2011, with every team in the conference playing a game against another conference team. The final game of any team in the conference was November 19, 2011 when Ottawa lost in the first round of postseason play.

== Conference teams and information ==
Conference rules require each team to play all other teams within the conference and two other regular season non-conference game for a total of 11 games. Previously, the conference only allowed a 10-game season.

School	Mascot	Head coach	Location	Stadium
Bethany	Terrible Swedes	Jamie Cruce	Lindsborg, Kansas	Lindstrom Field
Bethel	Threshers	Travis Graber	North Newton, Kansas	Thresher Stadium
Friends	Falcons	Monty Lewis	Wichita, Kansas	Adair-Austin Stadium
Kansas Wesleyan	Coyotes	Dave Dallas	Salina, Kansas	Salina Stadium
McPherson	Bulldogs	Joe Bettasso	McPherson, Kansas	McPherson Stadium
Ottawa	Braves	Kent Kessinger	Ottawa, Kansas	Peoples Bank Field
Saint Mary	Spires	Lance Hinson	Leavenworth, Kansas	Saint Mary Field
Southwestern	Moundbuilders	Ken Crandall	Winfield, Kansas	Richard L. Jantz Stadium
Sterling	Warriors	Andy Lambert	Sterling, Kansas	Smisor Stadium
Tabor	Bluejays	Mike Gardner	Hillsboro, Kansas	Joel Wiens Stadium

== Preseason outlook ==
The 2011 Spring coaches' poll placed three teams in the conference in the "Top 25" of the NAIA. McPherson received a No. 9 ranking, Ottawa was ranked at No. 10, and Kansas Wesleyan at No. 20. Sterling and Friends also received votes in the poll.

The 2011 preseason coaches' poll in August dropped McPherson from No. 9 to No. 12. Ottawa maintained its position as No. 10 and Kansas Wesleyan dropped from No. 20 to No. 21. As with the spring poll, both Sterling and Friends also received votes.

== Schedule ==
Schedule is subject to change.

Index to colors and formatting
KCAC member won
KCAC member lost
Winning team in **bold**

=== Week 0 ===
Date	Time	Visiting team	Home team	Site	TV	Result	Attendance	Ref.
August 27, 2011	5:30 pm	Sterling	**William Jewell**	Greene Stadium • Liberty, Missouri		**L** 6–33	1502	
August 27, 2011	7:00 pm	No. 10 Ottawa	No. 23 **Baker University**	Liston Stadium • Baldwin City, Kansas (College Fanz First Down Classic)	Victory Sports Network	**L** 16–41	–	
^{#}Rankings from NAIA Coaches' Poll. All times are in Central Time.

Called "Week 0" or "Week Zero" because of the few number of games played, usually considered to be "specially scheduled" such as the traditional College Fanz First Down Classic, although any game played this week is considered a "regular season" game. Both KCAC teams that played this week lost.

==== Sterling vs. William Jewell ====
	1	2	3	4	Total
Sterling	6	0	0	0	**6**
William Jewell	7	7	13	6	**33**

The Sterling College Warriors began the 2011 season with a loss to NCAA Division II William Jewell. Sterling scored first with two field goals by kicker Doug Dunn in the first quarter but was no match as William Jewell rolled on with 33 points.

Sterling gave up five fumbles and only accumulated 227 yards of offense. It was the first football game for William Jewell since leaving the NAIA to join the NCAA. William Jewell gave up two fumbles and scored three rushing touchdowns during the game, leaving the final score 33–6

==== #10 Ottawa vs. No. 23 Baker ====
	1	2	3	4	Total
#10 Ottawa	13	4	0	0	**17**
**#23 Baker**	14	3	10	14	**41**

Nationally ranked at No. 23, Baker University upset No. 10 ranked Ottawa University in the 2011 College Fanz First Down Classic played at Liston Stadium in Baldwin City, Kansas. Ottawa scored first when Shane Gimzo completed a 9-yard run for a touchdown with 9:02 remaining in the first quarter. It was the only lead Ottawa would hold for the entire game, which they lost when Baker's Tyler Hatcher ran the kickoff return for 82 yards for a touchdown and Andrew Kimrey completed the PAT kick. Later that same quarter, Baker's Reggie Harris ran a 62-yard punt return for a touchdown to take the lead.

Ottawa got close several times with the score at the end of the first half with Baker leading 16–17.

Baker held Ottawa scoreless in the second half of play while scoring three touchdowns and a field goal. Baker recovered two fumbles and intercepted two passes to win with a final score of 41–16.

=== Week 1 ===
Date	Time	Visiting team	Home team	Site	TV	Result	Attendance	Ref.
September 3, 2011	1:00 pm	Bethel	No. 8 **William Penn**	Oskaloosa Community Stadium • Oskaloosa, Iowa		**L** 0–56	–	
September 3, 2011	1:30 pm	No. 22 **Benedictine**	Sterling	Smisor Stadium • Sterling, Kansas		**L** 14–0	–	
September 3, 2011	1:30 pm	**Nebraska Wesleyan**	Saint Mary	Saint Mary Field • Leavenworth, Kansas		**L** 58–34	–	
September 3, 2011	5:00 pm	Southwestern Assemblies of God	**Bethany**	Lindstrom Field • Lindsborg, Kansas		**W** 21–29	–	
September 3, 2011	6:00 pm	No. 20 Kansas Wesleyan	No. 19 **Southern Nazarene**	McFarland Park Stadium • Bethany, Oklahoma		**L** 23–52	2,000	
September 3, 2011	6:00 pm	No. 14 **Northwestern (Iowa)**	Southwestern	Richard L. Jantz Stadium • Winfield, Kansas		**L** 47–13	–	
September 3, 2011	6:00 pm	No. 10 McPherson	No. 11 **Missouri Valley College**	Gregg-Mitchell Field • Marshall, Missouri		**L** 10–47	–	
September 3, 2011	6:00 pm	No. 9 **Georgetown College**	No. 10 Ottawa	Peoples Bank Field • Ottawa, Kansas		**L** 21–19	–	
September 3, 2011	7:00 pm	**Tabor**	Haskell	Haskell Stadium • Lawrence, Kansas		**W** 0–48	–	
^{#}Rankings from NAIA Coaches' Poll. All times are in Central Time.

At the end of this week's play, only two teams won games: Bethany and Tabor held a record of 1–0. The Friends Falcons wait until week 2 for their first game, placing their record at 0–0 at the end of this week. Sterling and Ottawa played the previous week and this week, losing both games and having a record of 0–2, and all other teams in the KCAC held a record of 0–1 by the end of play in Week 1.

==== Bethel vs. No. 8 William Penn ====
	1	2	3	4	Total
Bethel	0	0	0	0	**0**
**#8 William Penn**	14	28	14	0	**56**

William Penn began the game ranked No. 8 nationally and proceeded to statistically dominate the Bethel Threshers, starting with a 48-yard pass from Taylor Parsons to DeMarco for a touchdown in the first quarter. William Penn accumulated 589 yards in total offense where Bethel only managed 174 and failed to score the entire game. Bethel gave up two fumbles and an interception where William Penn did not commit any turnovers.

==== #22 Benedictine vs. Sterling ====
	1	2	3	4	Total
**#23 Benedictine**	7	7	0	0	**14**
Sterling	0	0	0	0	**0**

Sterling lost its second consecutive game and its home opener to No. 22 ranked Benedictine. Benedictine achieved 265 yards in total offense where Sterling managed only 76. Both teams combined for 17 punts in the game for a total of 337 yards punting. On defense, Sterling managed one interception for 20 yards but also lost a fumble on offense.

The only scores came from Benedictine's two touchdowns and extra points in the first and second quarter, leaving the final score at 14–0.

==== Nebraska Wesleyan vs. Saint Mary ====
	1	2	3	4	Total
**Nebraska Wesleyan**	34	3	7	14	**58**
Saint Mary	7	14	0	13	**34**

Saint Mary opened the season dominating statistically the visiting team from Nebraska Wesleyan in most every category, but still ended up losing the game by a score of 58–34. Saint Mary achieved 22 first downs and recorded 503 yards of total offense, 485 by passing. However, Saint Mary also gave up 5 interceptions during the game plus an additional fumble. Nebraska Wesleyan only managed 355 yards of total offense and 16 first downs, but it was more than enough to win the game.

==== Southwestern Assemblies of God vs. Bethany ====
	1	2	3	4	Total
Southwestern Assemblies of God	7	7	7	0	**21**
**Bethany**	9	7	7	6	**29**

Neither the Southwestern Assemblies of God Lions nor Bethany Terrible Swedes cleared 300 yards in total offense in their matchup, but Bethany was able to pull down the win in the first game of the season for both teams. Both teams recorded three touchdowns during the game, but Bethany's kicking game brought in two extra points and the defense scored a safety to end the game 29–21. Both teams also scored a touchdown apiece on defense: the Lions by advancing a recovered fumble, and the Swedes by returning an intercepted pass.

==== #20 Kansas Wesleyan vs. No. 19 Southern Nazarene ====
	1	2	3	4	Total
#20 Kansas Wesleyan	14	3	0	6	**23**
**#19 Southern Nazarene**	10	14	14	11	**49**

An estimated 2,000 fans were in attendance when Southern Nazarene piled on 615 yards of total offense with two rushing touchdowns and four passing touchdowns in first game of the 2011 season for both schools. The Crimson Storm defense added another touchdown to the mix when Matt Pruitt managed a 61-yard interception return in the fourth quarter, and kicker Ian Sanders added an additional ten points with his foot.

Kansas Wesleyan scored three touchdowns with kicker Jesus Ochoa successful on three PATs and a 35-yard field goal. Kansas Wesleyan did manage to average 5.1 yards per carry on the ground compared to Southern Nazarene's 4.5 yards per carry, but the Coyotes achieved 385 yards of total offense and averaged 4.1 yards per pass, compared to Nazarene's 8.5. While Wesleyan scored first and was ahead 14–10 at the end of the first quarter, they could not maintain the lead and Nazarene won by a final score of 49–23.

==== #12 McPherson vs. No. 11 Missouri Valley ====
	1	2	3	4	Total
#12 McPherson	3	0	0	7	**10**
**#11 Missouri Valley**	14	6	7	20	**47**

#11 Missouri Valley proved its ranking above No. 12 McPherson with a 47–10 thrashing in its home opener against last year's KCAC champion. Missouri Valley took the lead in the first quarter when Lorenzo Dennard completed 5-yard run for a touchdown and held the lead for the remainder of the game. Missouri Valley scored seven touchdowns: five on the ground, one by air, and one more on defense while accumulating 486 yards of total offense. McPherson could only manage one touchdown and 136 yards of total offense and could not convert a single third down situation in 14 attempts.

Local McPherson sportswriter Steve Sell noted before the game that McPherson's team was "full of unknowns" and noted that the more challenging opponent scheduled early in the season is different from previous years.

==== #9 Georgetown (KY) vs. No. 10 Ottawa ====
	1	2	3	4	Total
**#9 Georgetown**	7	14	0	0	**21**
#10 Ottawa	0	13	6	0	**19**

Georgetown College traveled from Kentucky to Kansas and defeated the Ottawa Braves in a close game that ended with a final score or 21–19. Georgetown's Zach Sowder scored two rushing touchdowns, the first a 1-yard run in the first quarter, and the second a 64-yard run in the second quarter. Ottawa's Clarence Anderson also scored two touchdowns, the first a 6-yard pass from Bobby Adamson and the second an 85-yard kickoff return.

Both teams produced comparable statistics throughout the game, but the difference-maker in the score was that two of Ottawa's extra point attempts were blocked by the Georgetown defense.

==== Tabor vs. Haskell ====
	1	2	3	4	Total
**Tabor**	8	10	20	10	**48**
Haskell Indian Nations	0	0	0	0	**0**

Tabor's James Monroe scored three rushing touchdowns and teammate Brandon Johnson ran for two more in Tabor's 48–0 rout of Haskell Indian Nations. Tabor's kicker Anthony Pacheco added 10 more points through the game and quarterback Tim Rozzell ran for one more.

Tabor managed 492 yards of total offense while keeping Haskell at 108, with −9 yards in total rushing. Haskell also committed four turnovers in the game.

=== Week 2 ===
Date	Time	Visiting team	Home team	Site	TV	Result	Attendance	Ref.
September 10, 2011	1:30 pm	Friends	**Saint Mary**	Saint Mary Field • Leavenworth, Kansas		0–1	–	
September 10, 2011	6:00 pm	No. 21 Kansas Wesleyan	No. 10 **Ottawa**	Peoples Bank Field • Ottawa, Kansas		19–44	–	
September 10, 2011	7:00 pm	**Southwestern**	Bethel	Thresher Stadium • North Newton, Kansas		45–10	–	
September 10, 2011	7:00 pm	Tabor	**Sterling**	Smisor Stadium • Sterling, Kansas		8–24	–	
September 10, 2011	7:30 pm	**Bethany**	No. 12 McPherson	McPherson Stadium • McPherson, Kansas (Blake Reed Memorial Football Game)		43–34	–	
^{#}Rankings from NAIA Coaches' Poll. All times are in Central Time.

All games played during week 2 of the 2011 season were conference games. Only Bethany (2–0) and Friends (1–0) are undefeated for the season so far. Southwestern, Ottawa, and Sterling are also undefeated in conference play but have lost games in non-conference play. The remaining teams have all lost one game in conference play—of the remaining, only Tabor holds a non-conference win while the rest have failed to win a game as of the second week of the season.

==== Friends vs. Saint Mary ====
	1	2	3	4	Total
Friends	0				**0**
**Saint Mary**	1				**1**

The Friends Falcons came from behind a 21–10 deficit in the fourth quarter and defeated Saint Mary 24–21. The previous year, Friends went in the game ranked No. 19 but lost to unranked Saint Mary by a score of 38–35.

Friends produced less total yards of offense, but led a more balanced attack between rushing and passing. Saint Mary managed 304 yards of total offense made up of 282 by air and 22 by ground. The Friends defense did manage to get three interceptions during the game.

Friends later forfeited the game due to the use of an ineligible player. Friends head coach Monty Lewis was suspended for one game by the school's athletic department.

==== Kansas Wesleyan vs. No. 10 Ottawa ====
	1	2	3	4	Total
Kansas Wesleyan	0	7	6	6	**19**
**#10 Ottawa**	10	17	7	10	**44**

Ottawa managed its first win of the season after dropping two games achieve an overall record of 1–2 for the season after week 2, and they did so by taking the lead against Kansas Wesleyan in the first quarter when Clarence Anderson caught a 5-yard pass from Bobby Adamson for a touchdown and held the lead for the remainder of the game. In addition to 4 offensive touchdowns for Ottawa, Donald Anderson took a 77-yard interception for a touchdown in the third quarter.

Ottawa was especially able to take advantage of mistakes made by Wesleyan's punt team with a dropped snap and then a blocked put, gaining possession twice deep in Wesleyan's field.

==== Southwestern vs. Bethel ====
	1	2	3	4	Total
**Southwestern**	7	14	14	10	**45**
Bethel	7	0	3	0	**10**

Southwestern won its first game of the season by defeating Bethel 45–10.

Bethel scored first when Marquis Sykes completed a 15-yard run for a touchdown in the first quarter, and Brandon Lluis converted the extra point. Lluis also hit a 25-yard field goal in the third quarter, but the rest of the game went to Southwestern. The Moundbuilders averaged nearly 8 yards per play on offense as they racked up 485 yards in 62 plays from scrimmage. They achieved 21 first downs and 6 touchdowns (5 rushing, 1 passing) with Austin Ledy successful on 6 extra point kicks plus a 36-yard field goal in the fourth quarter.

==== Tabor vs. Sterling ====
	1	2	3	4	Total
Tabor	0	0	0	8	**8**
**Sterling**	7	10	7	0	**24**

Sterling held Tabor scoreless until 1:12 remained in the game, when James Monroe completed a 2-yard run for a touchdown and followed up with another carry for the two-point conversion. For Sterling, Matt James caught two passes from quarterback Chris Joly for touchdowns, Mike Talton managed a 54-yard punt return for a touchdown, and kicker Doug Dunn added 6 more points with his foot. Sterling finished with 160 offensive yards and held Tabor to 256 yards, but forced six turnovers during the game.

==== Bethany vs. No. 12 McPherson ====
	1	2	3	4	Total
**Bethany**	16	14	6	7	**43**
#12 McPherson	7	21	0	6	**34**

Bethany scored a major upset against twelfth-ranked and winless McPherson, resulting in springboarding themselves to the top of the KCAC.

Bethany managed 512 yards of total offense to McPherson's 422. Bethany led the entire game from the first quarter, but McPherson closed the gap several times within two points.

Bethany's Junior Allen ran for 194 yards and four touchdowns on 44 carries. Quarterback Darby House threw for 312 yards as Bethany had 512 total yards.

=== Week 3 ===
Date	Time	Visiting team	Home team	Site	TV	Result	Attendance	Ref.
September 17, 2011	1:30 pm	No. 24 **Ottawa**	Saint Mary	Saint Mary Field • Leavenworth, Kansas		30–14	–	
September 17, 2011	6:00 pm	Friends	No. 13 **Southern Nazarene**	McFarland Park Stadium • Bethany, Oklahoma		**L** 10–35	–	
September 17, 2011	7:00 pm	Bethel	No. 19 **Bethany**	Lindstrom Field • Lindsborg, Kansas		34–66	–	
September 17, 2011	6:00 pm	Sterling	**Kansas Wesleyan**	Salina Stadium • Salina, Kansas		21–24	–	
September 18, 2011 delay	6:00 pm	**McPherson**	Southwestern	Richard L. Jantz Stadium • Winfield, Kansas		13–10	–	
^{#}Rankings from NAIA Coaches' Poll. All times are in Central Time.

For week three, the one non-conference game was lost by Friends to No. 13 Southern Nazarene. 19th Ranked Bethany secured another win, and the McPherson-Southwestern game was delayed in the middle of the first quarter because of weather and resumed the next day.

==== #24 Ottawa vs. Saint Mary ====
	1	2	3	4	Total
**#24 Ottawa**	23	0	7	0	**30**
Saint Mary	7	7	0	0	**14**

Ottawa scored three touchdowns and a field goal in the first quarter and put the game out of reach for Saint Mary, despite the fact that Saint Mary had a more productive offense, posting 314 yards to Ottawa's 286. Saint Mary completed 232 yards in passing on 21 attempts, but gave up 5 interceptions in Ottawa's 30–14 victory.

==== Sterling vs. Kansas Wesleyan ====
	1	2	3	4	Total
Sterling	14	7	0	0	**21**
**Kansas Wesleyan**	0	14	0	10	**24**

Kansas Wesleyan led the way, producing 458 yards in total offense compared to Sterling's 250, yet Sterling kept pace with their opponent with each team producing three touchdowns and converting their extra points. Sterling committed a total of 13 penalties in the game, giving Kansas Wesleyan an additional 127 yards while the Coyotes only committed three penalties for a total of 23 yards.

Sterling scored all their points in the first half, while Kansas Wesleyan scored in the second and fourth quarters. On the final play of the game, Wesleyan's Terry Stecker completed a 36-yard field goal to win the game 24–21.

==== Friends vs. No. 13 Southern Nazarene ====
	1	2	3	4	Total
Friends	0	3	0	7	**10**
**#13 Southern Nazarene**	7	0	7	21	**35**

Head Coach Monty Lewis was suspended and a weather delay that held up the game between the Southern Nazarene Crimson Storm and Friends falcons in the Southern Nazarene victory.

Friends managed a mere 87 yards of total offense and one touchdown against 13th-ranked Southern Nazarene, who piled on 400 yards and 5 touchdowns. A bright spot for Friends was a Kelton Miller 50-yard field goal in the second quarter. Southern Nazarene won the game with 21 unanswered points in the fourth quarter, putting the final score at 10–35.

==== McPherson vs. Southwestern ====
	1	2	3	4	Total
**McPherson**	6	0	0	7	**13**
Southwestern	0	10	0	0	**10**

McPherson traveled to Winfield on Saturday and McPherson's scored first when Chase Ozbun caught a 46-yard pass from Matt Summers for a touchdown in the first quarter. With 7:07 remaining in the first quarter, severe weather forced a delay of one day for the remainder of the game.

When the game restarted the next day, Southwestern managed ten points in the second quarter with a touchdown and field goal of their own, but McPherson made a final touchdown score in the fourth quarter to win the game 13–10.

==== Bethel vs. No. 19 Bethany ====
	1	2	3	4	Total
Bethel	7	13	0	14	**34**
**#19 Bethany**	21	28	3	14	**66**

Bethany scored on the first play of the game when Ira Autrey completed an 81-yard kickoff return for a touchdown. In the second quarter, his teammates Theron Allen tacked on an 80-yard kickoff return also for a touchdown; James Johnson managed a 58-yard punt return for a touchdown; and Skyler Jones picked up a fumble and carried it 6 yards for another touchdown return. One sportswriter stated that Bethany's "(s)pecial teams turned an otherwise competitive game into a blowout."

Bethany accumulated a total of 445 yards on offense, compared to Bethel's 336. Bethel managed 5 touchdowns, where Bethany achieved 9 for a final score of 66–34.

=== Week 4 ===
Date	Time	Visiting team	Home team	Site	TV	Result	Attendance	Ref.
September 24, 2011	6:00 pm	**Bethany**	Kansas Wesleyan	Salina Stadium • Salina, Kansas		25–0	–	
September 24, 2011	6:00 pm	**Southern Nazarene**	Bethel	Thresher Stadium • North Newton, Kansas		**L** 58–14	–	
September 24, 2011	6:00 pm	**Southwestern**	Sterling	Smisor Stadium • Sterling, Kansas		1–0	–	
September 24, 2011	7:00 pm	**McPherson**	Friends	Adair-Austin Stadium • Wichita, Kansas		31–17	–	
September 24, 2011	7:00 pm	**Saint Mary**	Tabor	Joel Weins Stadium • Hillsboro, Kansas		34–13	–	
^{#}Rankings from NAIA Coaches' Poll. All times are in Central Time.

In week 4, Bethel College lost a non-conference game against Southern Nazarene University. The remaining games were in-conference games. Ottawa did not play in week four.

==== Bethany vs. Kansas Wesleyan ====
	1	2	3	4	Total
**Bethany**	6	13	3	3	**25**
Kansas Wesleyan	0	0	0	0	**0**

Bethany traveled less than 20 miles to arch-rival Kansas Wesleyan, where placekicker Alex Fambrough kicked six field goals and an additional extra point to lead the Terrible Swedes to a victory.

Overall, Bethany piled on 466 yards of total offense and held Kansas Wesleyan to 283. The only player to score besides Fambrough was Theron Allen on a 35-yard touchdown run in the second quarter.

==== #12 Southern Nazarene vs. Bethel ====
	1	2	3	4	Total
**#12 Southern Nazarene**	21	21	7	9	**58**
Bethel	7	0	0	7	**14**

Southern Nazarene's Jakeil Everhart scored a touchdown with a 6-yard run with 12:53 remaining in the first quarter. Ten seconds later, his teammate Derick Perkins caught a 12-yard pass from quarterback Brady Wardlaw for their team's second touchdown. Through the remainder of the game, Southern Nazarene held the lead and accumulated 650 yards of total offense (377 rushing, 273 passing) and held Bethel to a total of 154 yards of offense and only 11 yards of rushing.

Bethel managed only 11 first downs (three which came from penalties) yet punted 12 times during the game. Bethel converted a third down to a first down only one time in fourteen attempts. Southern Nazarene led at halftime 42–7 and the final score ended at 58–14.

==== Southwestern vs. Sterling ====
In November, Sterling self-reported the unintentional use of an ineligible player and as a result forfeited three games played during the regular season. The first of those three games occurred in Week 4 against Southwestern.

The forfeit was declared after the game was played.

==== McPherson vs. Friends ====
	1	2	3	4	Total
**McPherson**	10	14	7	0	**31**
Friends	7	3	7	0	**17**

Jeran Trotter of Friends was the first to score on a 5-yard touchdown run in the first quarter, but by the end of the first quarter McPherson took the lead and held it for the rest of the game.

Friends recorded more yards on offense with 326 compared to McPherson's 275 (Friends actually had more rushing yards than McPherson produced in total offense), but two lost fumbles and two more interceptions led to a final score of 31–17 with a McPherson victory.

==== Saint Mary vs. Tabor ====
	1	2	3	4	Total
**Saint Mary**	7	17	3	7	**34**
Tabor	3	10	0	0	**13**

Saint Mary's David Harley returned a fumble for 1 yard to score a touchdown with exactly 9 minutes left in the first quarter, and his team held the lead for the remainder of the game. Saint Mary scored our touchdowns with 495 yards of offense while Tabor managed just one touchdown with 286 yards of offense.

Tabor was held scoreless in the second half while Saint Mary put up another 10 points toward the final score of 34–13.

=== Week 5 ===
Date	Time	Visiting team	Home team	Site	TV	Result	Attendance	Ref.
October 1, 2011	1:30 pm	No. 15 **Bethany**	Avila University	Rockhurst High School • Kansas City, Missouri		**W** 30–13	–	
October 1, 2011	1:30 pm	McPherson	**Bethel**	Thresher Stadium • North Newton, Kansas		35–42	–	
October 1, 2011	1:30 pm	Sterling	**Saint Mary**	Saint Mary Field • Leavenworth, Kansas		0–1	–	
October 1, 2011	6:00 pm	Haskell	**Southwestern**	Richard L. Jantz Stadium • Winfield, Kansas		**W** 0–65	–	
October 1, 2011	6:00 pm	Tabor	No. 21 **Ottawa**	Joel Weins Stadium • Hillsboro, Kansas		10–37	–	
October 1, 2011	7:00 pm	Kansas Wesleyan	**Friends**	Adair-Austin Stadium • Wichita, Kansas		7–56	–	
^{#}Rankings from NAIA Coaches' Poll. All times are in Central Time.

All ten conference teams played a game in week 5. Two teams played outside the conference and picked up non-conference wins as Southwestern defeated Haskell and No. 15 Bethany defeated Avila University.

==== #15 Bethany vs. Avila ====
	1	2	3	4	Total
**#15 Bethany**	7	3	13	7	**30**
Avila	3	0	0	10	**13**

Bethany out-paced Avila University in a game that statistically was closely matched between the two teams. Bethany put down 364 yards of total offense, compared to Avila's 331; Bethany had 21 first downs compared to Avila's 19; Bethany went 7 for 15 on third down conversions and Avila went 7 for 17; both teams were 0 for 1 on fourth down attempts. Each side lost a fumble, but Bethany gave up 2 interceptions where Avila had zero.

Despite the similarity of statistics, Bethany pulled off a non-conference win by a score of 30 to 13.

==== Bethel vs. McPherson ====
	1	2	3	4	Total
**Bethel**	7	14	21	0	**42**
McPherson	14	7	7	8	**36**

Last season's conference champions lost to last season's conference last-place team in a game where the underdog not only won but won as the visiting team.

McPherson did manage slightly more production in total offense, but it wasn't enough. Bethel found an edge in going 4 for 4 on fourth down attempts for a first down, and took two fumbles away from McPherson in their 42–35 victory.

==== Sterling vs. Saint Mary ====
In November, Sterling self-reported the unintentional use of an ineligible player and as a result, forfeited three games played during the regular season. The second of those three games occurred in Week 5 against Saint Mary.

==== Haskell vs. Southwestern ====
	1	2	3	4	Total
Haskell	0	0	0	0	**0**
**Southwestern**	28	14	14	9	**65**

Southwestern scored 28 points in the first quarter and did not look back, holding Haskell not only scoreless but without a first down as well. Southwestern accumulated 552 yards of total offense and scored nine touchdowns, including Lorenzo Fouts's 76-yard punt return in the fourth quarter.

The loss put Haskell to 0–6 for the season. Southwestern quarterback Brady May passed for 221 yards and three touchdowns in 9 of 10 attempts.

==== Tabor vs. No. 21 Ottawa ====
	1	2	3	4	Total
Tabor	0	0	3	7	**10**
**#21 Ottawa**	7	10	7	13	**37**

Ottawa's Shane Gimzo ran for three touchdowns and threw for one more on the way to their team's victory over Tabor. A bright spot for Tabor was Maurice Johnson's 80-yard punt return for a touchdown in the fourth quarter.

Tabor was able to achieve just 266 yards of total offense while Ottawa earned 473 yards. Ottawa managed 26 first downs compared to Tabor's 11, and was 10–22 on third down attempts while Tabor could only convert one third down out of 11 attempts. The final score ended at 37–10 with an Ottawa victory.

==== Kansas Wesleyan vs. Friends ====
	1	2	3	4	Total
Kansas Wesleyan	13	13	0	0	**26**
**Friends**	29	17	10	7	**63**

Reinhard Lugalia, a linebacker for Friends returned a fumble on the opening kickoff for 10 yards and a touchdown after only nine seconds of play. Friends completed a two-point conversion and held the lead for the rest of the game.

Friends accumulated 630 yards of total offense with 27 first downs and held Kansas Wesleyan to 148 yards and 4 first downs. Friends also converted 3 for 3 on fourth down attempts. The final score was 63–26.

=== Week 6 ===
Date	Time	Visiting team	Home team	Site	TV	Result	Attendance	Ref.
October 8, 2011	1:30 pm	Tabor	**Kansas Wesleyan**	Salina Stadium • Salina, Kansas		15–34	–	
October 8, 2011	1:30 pm	**Saint Mary**	No. 14 Bethany	Lindstrom Field • Lindsborg, Kansas		35–32	–	
October 8, 2011	1:30 pm	No. 19 **Ottawa**	Southwestern	Richard L. Jantz Stadium • Winfield, Kansas		41–19	–	
October 8, 2011	7:00 pm	**Friends**	Bethel	Thresher Stadium • North Newton, Kansas		56–7	–	
October 8, 2011	8:15 pm	McPherson	No. 12 **Azusa Pacific**	Cougar Athletic Stadium • Azusa, California		**L** 21–54	–	
^{#}Rankings from NAIA Coaches' Poll. All times are in Central Time.

McPherson College traveled to California for the lone non-conference game of the week, losing to Azusa Pacific University. Sterling College was idle in week 6, and all other teams played conference games.

==== Tabor vs. Kansas Wesleyan ====
	1	2	3	4	Total
Tabor	3	6	6	0	**15**
**Kansas Wesleyan**	17	0	7	10	**34**

Tabor took the lead 3–0 when Anthony Pacheco was successful with a 25-yard field goal in the first quarter. Later in the same quarter, Kansas Wesleyan's Brett Giesen made good on a 5-yard run for a touchdown and Wesleyan held the lead for the remainder of the game.

Tabor managed 347 yards of total offense but just one touchdown, while Kansas Wesleyan made a mere two more yards in total offense with 349 but came up with four touchdowns in the game. Wesleyan won with the final score at 34–15.

==== Saint Mary vs. No. 14 Bethany ====
	1	2	3	4	Total
**Saint Mary**	7	14	0	14	**35**
#14 Bethany	7	12	6	7	**32**

When Bethany's Theron Allen made a 1-yard run for a touchdown and Alex Fambrough kicked the extra point with 11:25 left to play in the first quarter, the Terrible Swedes looked to be on to another win. Later in that same quarter, Saint Mary's Will Ryan scored on a 26-yard run and Bobby Schattle's extra point tied the score. The lead either changed or was tied a total of eight different times during the game, which saw Saint Mary produce 485 yards of total offense and 5 touchdowns while holding their ranked opponent to just 440 yards and 4 touchdowns. Saint Mary finished the game in the lead 35–32 to win the game.

==== #19 Ottawa vs. Southwestern ====
	1	2	3	4	Total
**#19 Ottawa**	10	14	17	0	**41**
Southwestern	7	6	0	6	**19**

Ottawa piled on 507 yards of total offense and 5 touchdowns while holding Southwestern to 363 yards and 2 touchdowns in their 41–19 rout of the Moundbuilders. A highlight, Ottawa's Clarence Anderson completed 88-yard punt return for a touchdown in the third quarter. Ottawa led the entire game and won with a final score 41–19.

==== Friends vs. Bethel ====
	1	2	3	4	Total
**Friends**	15	20	7	14	**56**
Bethel	0	7	0	0	**7**

Friends piled on 467 yards of total offense and held Bethel to just 83 in a game that had Friends score a total of 8 touchdowns including a 60-yard fumble return in the fourth quarter. Bethel managed eight first downs and just one touchdown for the entire game.

Friends won the game with the final score at 56–7.

==== McPherson vs. No. 12 Azusa Pacific ====
	1	2	3	4	Total
McPherson	7	7	0	7	**21**
**#12 Azusa Pacific**	13	17	7	17	**54**

Azusa Pacific and McPherson met for their first ever football game. Starting with Azusa's Johnell Murphy making a 23-yard run for a touchdown, Azusa commanded the lead for the game.

McPherson managed 310 yards of total offense and 3 touchdowns, but Azusa Pacific put on 421 yards and 7 touchdowns. Both teams recorded 18 first downs. The final score was Azusa Pacific 54, McPherson 21.

=== Week 7 ===
Date	Time	Visiting team	Home team	Site	TV	Result	Attendance	Ref.
October 15, 2011	1:00 pm	**Bethel**	Sterling	Smisor Stadium • Sterling, Kansas		1–0	–	
October 15, 2011	1:30 pm	Kansas Wesleyan	**Lindenwood**	Harlen C. Hunter Stadium • St. Charles, Missouri		**L** 16–61	–	
October 15, 2011	1:30 pm	Southwestern	**Friends**	Adair-Austin Stadium • Wichita, Kansas		17–27	–	
October 15, 2011	1:30 pm	No. 16 **Ottawa**	McPherson	McPherson Stadium • McPherson, Kansas		35–21	–	
October 15, 2011	2:00 pm	No. 19 **Bethany**	Tabor	Joel Weins Stadium • Hillsboro, Kansas		38–35	–	
October 15, 2011	3:00 pm	Saint Mary	No. 11 **William Penn University**	Oskaloosa Community Stadium • Oskaloosa, Iowa		**L** 16–38	–	
^{#}Rankings from NAIA Coaches' Poll. All times are in Central Time.

Every team in the conference played a game during Week 7. Saint Mary and Kansas Wesleyan both played and lost non-conference games. All other conference teams played a conference opponent.

==== Bethel vs. Sterling ====
In November, Sterling self-reported the unintentional use of an ineligible player and as a result forfeited three games played during the regular season. The last of those three games occurred in Week 7 against Bethel.

==== Kansas Wesleyan vs. Lindenwood ====
	1	2	3	4	Total
Kansas Wesleyan	6	3	7	0	**16**
**Lindenwood**	10	34	17	0	**61**

Kansas Wesleyan traveled to Saint Charles, Missouri for a game against NCAA Division II Lindenwood University. Lindenwood was able to easily handle the Coyotes, helped by scoring 34 points in the second quarter. Kansas Wesleyan did start out on top with a 59-yard interception return for a touchdown in the first quarter to take a 6–0 lead, but the final score ended with Lindenwood winning 61–16.

==== Southwestern vs. Friends ====
	1	2	3	4	Total
Southwestern	0	0	7	10	**17**
**Friends**	10	14	0	3	**27**

Friends managed 337 yards of total offense with 254 yards passing and 83 yards rushing while managing to hold Southwestern to a total 208 yards in offense while gaining a comfortable 24–0 lead by halftime. Southwestern scored in the second half to bring the score within seven points and put the game within reach with 9:20 left in the fourth quarter when Joseph Vargas caught a 13-yard pass from Brady May and Austin Ledy kicked the extra point. Friends would score one more time with Keylyn Pohlman's 26-yard field goal to put the final score at 27–17.

==== #16 Ottawa vs. McPherson ====
	1	2	3	4	Total
**#16 Ottawa**	35	0	0	0	**35**
McPherson	7	7	7	0	**21**

Ottawa scored all its points in the first quarter. Ottawa scored first and McPherson tied the score in the first quarter 7–7, but Ottawa's five rushing touchdowns made all the difference in their 35–21 victory. McPherson did manage to outproduce Ottawa offensively with 440 total yards to Ottawa's 362, but the effort failed to lead to victory for the Bulldogs.

==== #19 Bethany vs. Tabor ====
	1	2	3	4	Total
**#19 Bethany**	10	21	7	0	**38**
Tabor	0	14	7	14	**35**

Bethany took the lead in the first quarter with 10:17 on the clock when D'Andre Thompson caught a 12-yard pass from Darby House for a touchdown, but that didn't stop Tabor from attempting a fourth-quarter comeback. Spurred on by Spencer Brown's 78-yard fumble return for a touchdown in the third quarter, Tabor got the score within three points when James Monroe ran in a two-point conversion with 6:28 remaining in the game.

Tabor nor Bethany would not score again and the final score stayed at 38–35.

==== Saint Mary vs. No. 11 William Penn ====
	1	2	3	4	Total
Saint Mary	3	10	3	0	**16**
**#11 William Penn**	14	7	10	7	**38**

William Penn's P.J. Perry scored a touchdown with a 15-yard run in the first quarter to take the lead. Saint Mary closed the lead to within one point in the second quarter when Bobby Schattle's extra point kick was good, but William Penn held on for the remainder of the game after scoring a total of five touchdowns and holding Saint Mary to one. William Penn won the game 38–16.

=== Week 8 ===
Date	Time	Visiting team	Home team	Site	TV	Result	Attendance	Ref.
October 22, 2011	1:30 pm	**Kansas Wesleyan**	Bethel	Thresher Stadium • North Newton, Kansas		68–7	–	
October 22, 2011	1:30 pm	Friends	No. 20 **Bethany**	Lindstrom Field • Lindsborg, Kansas		7–17	–	
October 22, 2011	1:30 pm	**McPherson**	Tabor	Joel Weins Stadium • Hillsboro, Kansas		28–12	–	
October 22, 2011	1:30 pm	Saint Mary	**Southwestern**	Richard L. Jantz Stadium • Winfield, Kansas		31–40	–	
October 22, 2011	6:00 pm	Sterling	No. 15 **Ottawa**	Peoples Bank Field • Ottawa, Kansas		6–27	–	
^{#}Rankings from NAIA Coaches' Poll. All times are in Central Time.

==== Kansas Wesleyan vs. Bethel ====
	1	2	3	4	Total
**Kansas Wesleyan**	10	30	21	7	**68**
Bethel	0	7	0	0	**7**

Kansas Wesleyan rolled to 635 yards in total offense and 9 touchdowns while holding Bethel to 235 total yards and 1 touchdown. Wesleyan averaged 8.9 yards per play while Bethel averaged 3.4.

Most everything seemed to go right for Wesleyan: Langston Kennedy returned a 12-yard interception for a touchdown; Taylor Sachs returned a blocked put for a touchdown; Terry Stecker scored 14 points kicking; Wesleyan's offense was 2–2 on fourth down attempts; and Wesleyan's defense held Bethel to 9–20 for third down attempts. Four athletes for Wesleyan completed at least one pass, and three of those threw at least one touchdown. Wesleyan scored 23 points in the final 2:09 of the first half, leaving the final score a lopsided 68–7.

==== Friends vs. No. 20 Bethany ====
	1	2	3	4	Total
Friends	7	0	0	0	**7**
**#20 Bethany**	0	14	3	0	**17**

Bethany ruled the air with 230 yards of passing offense and two touchdowns while holding Friends to just 28 passing yards and only one touchdown. Bethany's Alex Fambrough was successful with a 20-yard field goal and two extra point kicks to add on to Bethany's 17–7 victory over Friends.

Friends did score first when Jeran Trotter made good on a 9-yard run for a touchdown and Keylyn Pohlman kicked the extra point in the first quarter. It was the last time they would score in the game, and Bethany would only score in the second and third quarters leaving no points for either team in the fourth.

==== McPherson vs. Tabor ====
	1	2	3	4	Total
**McPherson**	14	14	0	0	**28**
Tabor	0	0	0	12	**12**

McPherson scored 28 points in the first half and saw no need to put on any more points for the remainder of the game, and held Tabor scoreless for the first three quarters of play. McPherson's offense earned 404 total yards and 4 touchdowns while Tabor managed 295 total yards and two touchdowns. Tabor fumbled the ball eight times and turned it over to McPherson for three of those.

McPherson won the game with a final score of 28–12.

==== Saint Mary vs. Southwestern ====
	1	2	3	4	Total
Saint Mary	7	3	7	14	**31**
**Southwestern**	7	12	14	7	**40**

Southwestern took the lead with 13:06 in the first quarter when Corey Holbert ran for 3 yards and Austin Ledy made good on the extra point, but Saint Mary tied it up with 9:21 left in that same quarter when Alex Gomes-Coelho caught a 15-yard pass from Mike Keese and Bobby Schattle's kick was good.

Southwestern took the lead and held it until the third quarter when Saint Mary pulled ahead. Southwestern then took the lead back in the third quarter and held it for the remainder of the game. However, one source claims that Southwestern never lost the lead the entire game.

==== Sterling vs. No. 15 Ottawa ====
	1	2	3	4	Total
Sterling	6	0	0	0	**6**
**#15 Ottawa**	7	13	0	7	**27**

Ottawa held Sterling to 187 yards in total offense and one touchdown while achieving 360 yards and four touchdowns themselves. Ottawa took the lead 6–0 in the first quarter when CJ Krug caught a 12-yard pass from Bobby Adamson for a touchdown. Sterling's only score came from a touchdown in the first quarter when Brayton Gillen ran 85 yards on an interception return for six points.

The final score was Ottawa 27, Sterling 6.

=== Week 9 ===
Date	Time	Visiting team	Home team	Site	TV	Result	Attendance	Ref.
October 29, 2011	1:30 pm	Southwestern	**Kansas Wesleyan**	Salina Stadium • Salina, Kansas		35–45	–	
October 29, 2011	1:30 pm	**Friends**	Sterling	Smisor Stadium • Sterling, Kansas		19–0	–	
October 29, 2011	1:30 pm	No. 14 **Ottawa**	No. 18 Bethany	Lindstrom Field • Lindsborg, Kansas		30–17	–	
October 29, 2011	1:30 pm	McPherson	**Saint Mary**	Saint Mary Field • Leavenworth, Kansas		31–34	–	
October 29, 2011	1:30 pm	**Tabor**	Bethel	Thresher Stadium • North Newton, Kansas		20–7	–	
^{#}Rankings from NAIA Coaches' Poll. All times are in Central Time.

==== Southwestern vs. Kansas Wesleyan ====
	1	2	3	4	Total
Southwestern	7	7	0	21	**35**
**Kansas Wesleyan**	21	7	10	7	**45**

Kansas Wesleyan scored 21 points in the first quarter and Southwestern scored 21 points in the fourth quarter in this high-scoring game. The Moundbuilders managed 523 yards of total offense and 5 touchdowns while the Coyotes put together 388 total yards and 6 touchdowns. Southwestern was 8 for 19 on third down and 3 for 7 on fourth down, while Wesleyan was 4 for 14 on third and 1 for 2 on fourth.

Kansas Wesleyan ended up winning by ten points: 45–35.

==== Friends vs. Sterling ====
	1	2	3	4	Total
**Friends**	0	6	0	13	**19**
Sterling	0	0	0	0	**0**

Friends held Sterling to no score and managed three touchdowns in their 2011 matchup. Friends made one touchdown passing, one rushing, and one on defense when Terry Cobb made good on a 36-yard pick. Friends earned 217 yards of total offense and held Sterling to just 84. Friends managed 3.4 yards per play and held Sterling to 1.8. The final score was 19–0.

==== #14 Ottawa vs. No. 18 Bethany ====
	1	2	3	4	Total
**#14 Ottawa**	14	9	7	0	**30**
#18 Bethany	7	7	3	0	**17**

With 12:29 left on the clock in the first quarter, Ottawa's Clarence Anderson caught a 17-yard pass from Bobby Adamson to take the lead. Ottawa held the lead for the remainder of the game, scoring four touchdowns and holding Bethany to two.

The final score was Ottawa 30, Bethany 17. With this win, Ottawa secured at least a share of the conference crown.

==== McPherson vs. Saint Mary ====
	1	2	3	4	Total
McPherson	7	7	3	14	**31**
**Saint Mary**	10	14	7	3	**34**

With 6:57 left in the first quarter, Saint Mary's Cris Basch grabbed an interception and ran it 30 yards for a touchdown. Saint Mary held the lead for the remainder of the game.

Twice McPherson got within three points (at the end of the first quarter and then again at the end of the game) and McPherson's offense outproduced Saint Mary by 476 total yards to 295. McPherson also earned 27 first downs while Saint Mary only made 14; McPherson was 2–2 on fourth down while Saint Mary was 1–2; and McPherson managed 6.3 yards per play while holding Saint Mary to 5.4.

Saint Mary managed better results in several areas: 5 penalties for 45 yards to McPherson's 10 for 99; 2 interceptions to zero; and 10 points by kicking to McPherson's 7. It was the three extra kicking points that made the difference in the score as Saint Mary won 34–31.

==== Tabor vs. Bethel ====
	1	2	3	4	Total
**Tabor**	14	6	0	0	**20**
Bethel	7	0	0	0	**7**

All points were scored in the first half during this game between Tabor and Bethel.

Tabor scored first when Duray Gardner caught a 21-yard pass from Simon Mckee and then Anthony Pacheco kicked the extra point to take the lead 7–0 in the first. Bethel's Jorden Oden completed a 3-yard run for a touchdown and Brandon Lluis's kick after tied the score. Still in the first quarter, Tabor took the lead back when Simon McKee carried the ball 1 yard to score and Anthony Pacheco made a second extra point to bring the score 14–7. In the second quarter, Tabor's James Monroe delivered a 98-yard run to the end zone for the final score of the game to put it at 20–7.

=== Week 10 ===
Date	Time	Visiting team	Home team	Site	TV	Result	Attendance	Ref.
November 5, 2011	1:30 pm	**Kansas Wesleyan**	McPherson	McPherson Stadium • McPherson, Kansas		38–37	–	
November 5, 2011	1:30 pm	No. 13 **Ottawa**	Friends	Adair-Austin Stadium • Wichita, Kansas		28–10	–	
November 5, 2011	1:30 pm	No. 24 **Bethany**	Sterling	Smisor Stadium • Sterling, Kansas		24–14	–	
November 5, 2011	1:30 pm	Bethel	**Saint Mary**	Saint Mary Field • Leavenworth, Kansas		10–51	–	
November 5, 2011	1:30 pm	Southwestern	**Tabor**	Joel L. Weins Stadium • Hillsboro, Kansas		13–17	–	
^{#}Rankings from NAIA Coaches' Poll. All times are in Central Time.

==== Kansas Wesleyan vs. McPherson ====
	1	2	3	4	Total
**Kansas Wesleyan**	14	10	0	14	**38**
McPherson	0	6	17	14	**37**

Kansas Wesleyan piled on 502 yards of total offense and McPherson created 392 of their own in what ended up being a one-point victory for Wesleyan.

Kansas Wesleyan put 24 points on the board before McPherson could manage a single score in the second quarter, and the first half ended with Wesleyan holding a comfortable 24–6 lead. In the third quarter, McPherson put seventeen unanswered points on the board to bring the game within reach but Wesleyan held the lead to the end of the game.

==== #13 Ottawa vs. Friends ====
	1	2	3	4	Total
**#13 Ottawa**	14	0	7	7	**28**
Friends	3	0	7	0	**10**

The Friends Falcons took an early lead when Keylyn Pohlman succeeded with a 19-yard field goal in the first period to take the lead 3–0. Just over three minutes later, Ottawa's Travis Adamson caught a 14-yard pass from Bobby Adamson, and Jeff Stamp's kick put Ottawa in the lead for good at 7–3.

Ottawa managed 4 touchdowns for the game and held Friends to just one in the third quarter. The final score was Ottawa 28, Friends 10.

==== #24 Bethany vs. Sterling ====
	1	2	3	4	Total
**#24 Bethany**	7	0	10	7	**24**
Sterling	7	0	7	0	**14**

Bethany took the lead with 8:52 left in the first quarter when Theron Allen made his first of two touchdowns. Sterling caught up and tie the score twice in the game. Bethany produced 232 yards of total offense and 3 touchdowns when Sterling could only come up with 175 total yards and two touchdowns. Bethany successfully converted 2 of 2 fourth down attempts when Sterling could only make good on 1 of 3.

The final score was Bethany 24, Sterling 14.

==== Bethel vs. Saint Mary ====
	1	2	3	4	Total
Bethel	3	0	7	0	**10**
**Saint Mary**	27	10	7	7	**51**

Bethel's head coach Travis Graber entered the game with respect for Saint Mary's Lance Hinson and the Spire's 3rd place national ranking in passing offense. Saint Mary used those passing skills to accumulate 537 yards and 4 touchdowns in passing alone. The Spires racked up 27 points in the first quarter and dominated the entire game, winning 51–10.

==== Southwestern vs. Tabor ====
	1	2	3	4	Total
Southwestern	0	10	3	0	**13**
**Tabor**	3	0	14	0	**17**

The lead changed three times when Tabor and Southwestern met. Tabor took the lead with 2:16 left in the first quarter when Anthony Pacheco made a 10-yard field goal. They held that lead of three until 14:18 on the clock in the second quarter when Adam Hilker caught a 9-yard pass from Brady May for a touchdown. Austin Ledy's kick made the score 7–3. Two more of Ledy's field goals increased Southwestern's lead 13–3.

Tabor's Simon McKee scored on a 14-yard carry and Pacheco was good again on the extra point, closing Southwestern's lead 13–10. Tabor's Justin Vargas made a 26-yard interception return for a touchdown and Pacheco's kick made the final score 17–13 in favor of Tabor.

=== Week 11 ===
Date	Time	Visiting team	Home team	Site	TV	Result	Attendance	Ref.
November 12, 2011	1:30 pm	**Saint Mary**	Kansas Wesleyan	Salina Stadium • Salina, Kansas		21–16	–	
November 12, 2011	1:30 pm	Tabor	**Friends**	Adair-Austin Stadium • Wichita, Kansas		21–31	–	
November 12, 2011	1:30 pm	No. 25 Bethany	**Southwestern**	Richard L. Jantz Stadium • Winfield, Kansas		30–38	–	
November 12, 2011	1:30 pm	Sterling	**McPherson**	McPherson Stadium • McPherson, Kansas		17–24	–	
November 12, 2011	1:30 pm	Bethel	No. 11 **Ottawa**	Peoples Bank Field • Ottawa, Kansas		6–72	–	
^{#}Rankings from NAIA Coaches' Poll. All times are in Central Time.

All games started in Week 11 at 1:30 pm on November 12. This week represented the last week of the regular season for every team, and all team played conference games.

==== Saint Mary vs. Kansas Wesleyan ====
	1	2	3	4	Total
**Saint Mary**	0	7	0	14	**21**
Kansas Wesleyan	0	7	3	6	**16**

Saint Mary racked up 402 yards of total offense and Kansas Wesleyan tacked on 349 of their own when the two teams met in Salina for the end of the regular season. Saint Mary managed three touchdowns and held Wesleyan to two in their game that ended with a final score of 21–16 with Saint Mary holding on to the lead for the win.

Saint Mary's Mike Keese (the ranked No. 2 passer in the NAIA) completed two touchdown passes into the wind during the fourth quarter to rally for the victory.

==== Tabor vs. Friends ====
	1	2	3	4	Total
Tabor	7	0	0	14	**21**
**Friends**	7	3	7	14	**31**

With 10:15 showing on the clock in the first quarter, Tabor's Simon Mckee achieve a 54-yard run for a touchdown. That and Anthony Pacheco's kick for the extra point put Tabor in the lead 7–0. With 6:34 on the clock and still in the first quarter, Friend's Will Bothwell made an 80-yard punt return for a touchdown. Keylyn Pohlman's kick tied the score 7–7 in the first.

The score remained tied until Pohlman made a field goal in the second quarter to take the lead. After 301 yards of total offense and holding Tabor to 193 yards, Friends held that lead for the remainder of the game. The final score was a ten-point victory for Friends: 31–21.

==== #25 Bethany vs. Southwestern ====
	1	2	3	4	Total
#25 Bethany	6	7	14	3	**30**
**Southwestern**	17	0	14	7	**38**

Southwestern took an early lead to upset #25 ranked Bethany in each team's final game of the 2011 season. Bethany took the lead in the third quarter and held it for just over six minutes, until Southwestern's Zak Tazkargy picked a 28-yard interception return for a touchdown. Southwestern held the lead for the remainder of the game with the final score at 38–30.

==== Sterling vs. McPherson ====
	1	2	3	4	Total
Sterling	0	14	0	3	**17**
**McPherson**	21	0	3	0	**24**

McPherson scored three touchdowns in the first quarter (two by Terrance Jones and one more by Taurus D'Antignac) to take a lead of 21–0. Sterling scored two touchdowns in the second quarter to bring the score to 21–14 at halftime. In the second half, each team managed a field goal to keep the final score seven points apart with McPherson winning 24–17.

==== Bethel vs. No. 10 Ottawa ====
	1	2	3	4	Total
Bethel	0	6	0	0	**6**
**#10 Ottawa**	28	21	21	2	**72**

On November 12, 2011, Bethel traveled to Ottawa for its final regular season game. After ten touchdowns and 467 yards of total offense, Ottawa won the game by a score of 72–6. Bethel's Nathan Murphy recovered a fumble in the end zone for their only score.

The game was surrounded in celebration of the 1,000th game of Ottawa football. Ottawa is the first team in the conference to reach the 1,000 game mark.

== Postseason ==
Date	Time	Visiting team	Home team	Site	TV	Result	Attendance	Ref.
November 19, 2011	3:00 pm	No. 10 Ottawa	No. 8 Azusa Pacific	Cougar Stadium • Azusa, California (NAIA Football National Championships first round)		L 26–49	-	
^{#}Rankings from NAIA Coaches' Poll. All times are in Central Time.

	1	2	3	4	Total
Ottawa	6	7	7	6	26
Azusa Pacific	21	7	21	0	49

Ottawa completed the regular season ranked No. 10 and was invited to the 2011 NAIA Football National Championship. Ottawa played No. 8 Azusa Pacific and lost in the first round by a score of 49–26. Ottawa gained 359 yards of total offense but gave up 587 yards to the Cougars. Ottawa made most of their yards passing, but gave up four interceptions in the process. This was the last game for any conference team in the 2011 season.

== Player and coach awards ==
Upon conclusion of the season play, the conference granted multiple individual and team awards. Lance Hinson and Kent Kessinger were both awarded "Coach of the Year", an honor that has been shared by Hinson previously. Several players were named "player of the year" in various categories and the conference also named first and second team "all-conference" players. The Dr. Ted Kessinger Champion of Character award was presented to Spencer Brown of Tabor.

Wide receiver Clarence Anderson was named the conference "Player of the Year" for his efforts. Anderson concluded the season ranked No. 1 in NAIA Division I in three categories: all purpose yards (1,981); punt Return yards per attempt (21.800); and in total punt returns (501). He was ranked second in three other categories and was ranked six or above in a total of 12 statistical categories.

Offensive Player of the Year went to Bethany Running back Theron "Junior" Allen. Allen concluded the season with national rankings of No. 1 for All Purpose per Game (170.900) and No. 2 for Total Rushing (1,404), Rushing Yards per Game (127.600), and All Purpose Yards (1,880).

Defensive Player of the Year was awarded to Dexter Davis of Friends. At Defensive end, Davis led the nation in Sacks per Game (1.400) and Total Sacks (14.000).

Special Teams Player of the Year was awarded to Kicker Alex Fambrough of Bethany. Fambrough ended the season ranked No. 2 in the NAIA Division I for total field goals with 17 and ranked No. 4 in total points for the season at 89.

Award	Recipient	Program
Regular Season Champion	team'	Ottawa
Coach of the Year	Lance Hinson; Kent Kessinger	Saint Mary; Ottawa
Assistant coach of the year	Josh Homolka	Ottawa
Player of the Year	Clarence Anderson	Ottawa
Offensive Player of the Year	Junior Allen	Bethany
Defensive Player of the Year	Dexter Davis	Friends
Special Teams Player of the Year	Alex Fambrough	Bethany
Dr. Ted Kessinger Champions of Character	Spencer Brown	Tabor
