= 2012 Kansas Collegiate Athletic Conference football season =

- KCAC Football official logo
- League: NAIA
- Sport: football
- Duration: Fall-Winter 2012
- Teams: 10

2012

Football seasons
- ← 2011 2013 →

2012 Kansas Collegiate Athletic Conference football standings
| | Conf. | | | Overall |
| Team | W | | L | W | | L |
|---|---|---|---|---|---|---|
| No. 16 Ottawa $^ | 8 | – | 1 | 8 | – | 3 |
| No. 18 Tabor | 7 | – | 1 | 8 | – | 2 |
| Kansas Wesleyan | 6 | – | 3 | 6 | – | 5 |
| Saint Mary (KS) | 6 | – | 3 | 6 | – | 5 |
| Friends | 5 | – | 4 | 6 | – | 5 |
| McPherson | 4 | – | 4 | 4 | – | 5 |
| Southwestern (KS) | 3 | – | 6 | 4 | – | 7 |
| Sterling | 3 | – | 6 | 3 | – | 7 |
| Bethany (KS) | 2 | – | 7 | 4 | – | 7 |
| Bethel (KS) | 0 | – | 9 | 0 | – | 10 |
$ – Conference champion; ^ – NAIA playoff participant; Rankings from NAIA Coaches' Poll

The 2012 Kansas Collegiate Athletic Conference football season was made up of 10 United States college athletic programs that competed in the Kansas Collegiate Athletic Conference (KCAC) under the National Association of Intercollegiate Athletics (NAIA) for the 2012 college football season. The season began play on August 25, 2012 when the Ottawa Braves hosted the Baker Wildcats.

== Conference teams and information ==
Conference rules require each team to play all other teams within the conference and two other regular season non-conference game for a total of 11 games. Up until 2011, the conference only allowed a 10-game season.

Two teams begin the season with new head coaches. Bethel's head coach Travis Graber resigned on July 27, 2012 with just over a month before the season begins for his team. Bethel named former assistant James Dotson as interim head coach for the 2012 season.

McPherson's Pete Sterbick is also new to his team and a first-year head coach. Sterbick was announced as the new head coach for the Bulldogs in February 2012.

| School | Mascot | Head coach | Location | Stadium |
|---|---|---|---|---|
| Bethany | Terrible Swedes | Jamie Cruce | Lindsborg, Kansas | Lindstrom Field |
| Bethel | Threshers | James Dotson | North Newton, Kansas | Thresher Stadium |
| Friends | Falcons | Monty Lewis | Wichita, Kansas | Adair-Austin Stadium |
| Kansas Wesleyan | Coyotes | Dave Dallas | Salina, Kansas | Salina Stadium |
| McPherson | Bulldogs | Pete Sterbick | McPherson, Kansas | McPherson Stadium |
| Ottawa | Braves | Kent Kessinger | Ottawa, Kansas | Peoples Bank Field |
| Saint Mary | Spires | Lance Hinson | Leavenworth, Kansas | Saint Mary Field |
| Southwestern | Moundbuilders | Ken Crandall | Winfield, Kansas | Richard L. Jantz Stadium |
| Sterling | Warriors | Andy Lambert | Sterling, Kansas | Smisor Stadium |
| Tabor | Bluejays | Mike Gardner | Hillsboro, Kansas | Joel Wiens Stadium |

== Preseason outlook ==
Immediately following the conference's "media day" on August 1, 2012, votes were tabulated for both the KCAC Coaches' and Media Preseason Polls. Ottawa University was the clear choice in both polls to win the conference, with nine first place votes in the coaches' poll and 15 in the Media Poll.

Nationally, the season began with Ottawa ranked #10 in the nation and Bethany ranked #24 nationally in the 2012 Spring NAIA Coaches' Poll. Friends received votes in the poll but was not ranked in the top 25.

== Regular season ==
Schedule is subject to change.

Index to colors and formatting
KCAC member won
KCAC member lost
Winning team in **bold**

=== Week 0 ===
| Date | Time | Visiting team | Home team | Site | TV | Result | Attendance | Ref. |
|---|---|---|---|---|---|---|---|---|
| August 25, 2012 | 6:00 PM | No. 18 **Baker** | No. 11 Ottawa | Peoples Bank Field • Ottawa, Kansas (NAIA Football Game of the Week) | | **L** 27–20 | – | |
| August 25, 2012 | 7:00 PM | Tabor | **Bacone** | Indian Bowl • Muskogee, Oklahoma | | **L** 20–25 | – | |
^{#}Rankings from NAIA Coaches' Poll. All times are in Central Time.

The season began with two non-conference games for the KCAC. Baker University from the Heart of America Athletic Conference traveled to Ottawa and Tabor visited Bacone College of the Central States Football League. Both KCAC teams lost their games, leaving the conference 0–2 against other conferences.

==== #18 Baker at #11 Ottawa ====
| | 1 | 2 | 3 | 4 | Total |
|---|---|---|---|---|---|
| **#18 Baker** | 3 | 3 | 7 | 14 | **27** |
| #11 Ottawa | 7 | 3 | 0 | 10 | **20** |

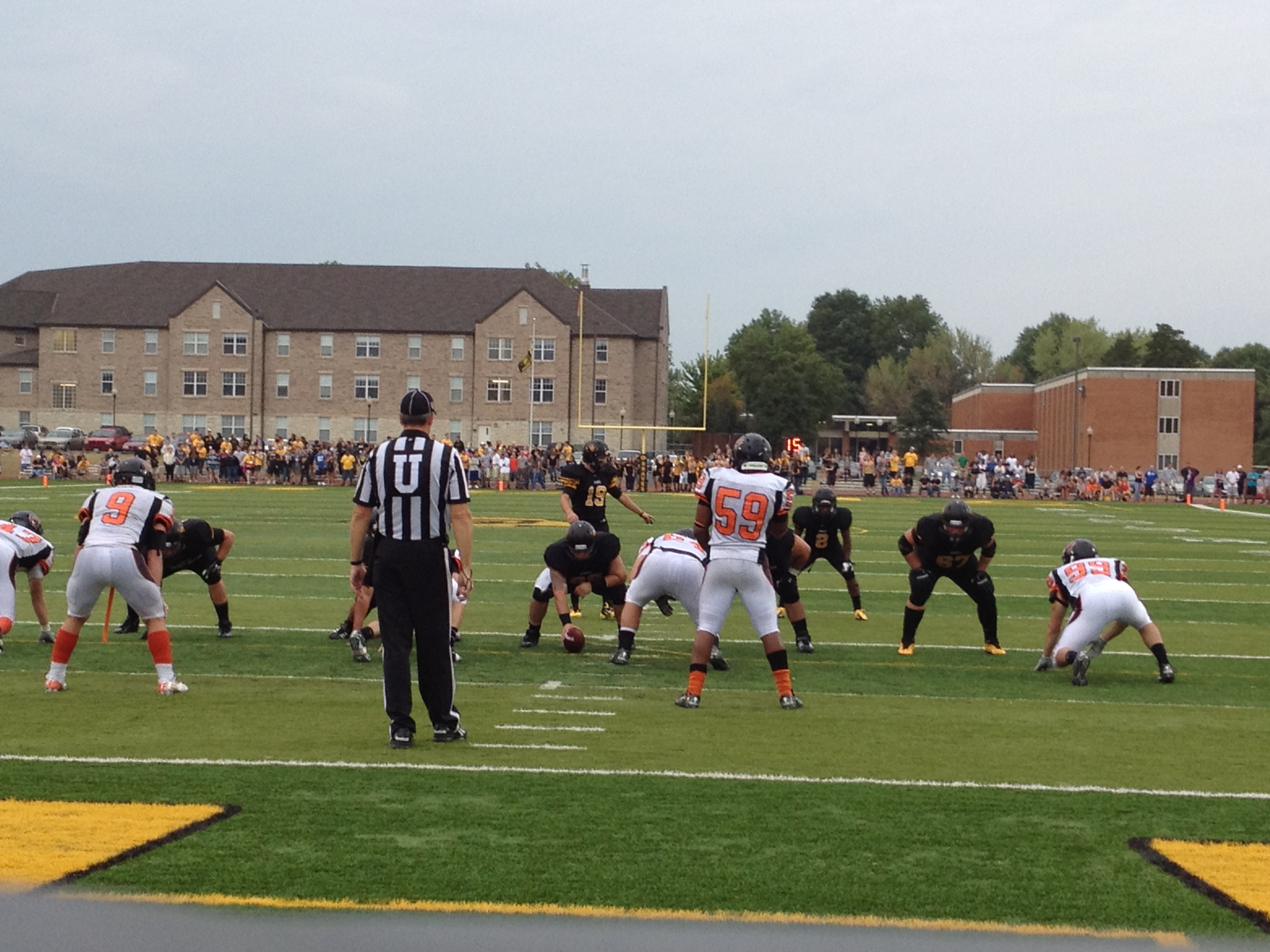
Ottawa lines up offensively against rival Baker in the NAIA Game of the Week on August 25, 2012.

Baker and Ottawa met in the season's first NAIA "Game of the Week" on August 25. This was the sixth time that both teams have met in their season opener, and the 81st meeting all-time for the two programs. Going into the game, Baker led the rivalry 45-33-2 including a 41-16 victory in 2011.

Ottawa came to the game winning the conference two of the last three seasons and with three consecutive post-season appearances. Baker has five consecutive winning seasons and five rankings in the top 25 final poll. Baker plays in the Heart of America Athletic Conference, considered one of the strongest in the NAIA.

When the game got under way, Baker scored first with a 12-yard field goal by Steven Stewart with 8:13 left in the first quarter, but not after losing starting quarterback Jake Morse to injury for the remainder of the game. With 4:45 left in the first, Ottawa answered back with a touchdown and kicked the extra point to make the score 7–3. One more field goal by each team put the score 10–6 at halftime.

In the fourth quarter, Baker took the score from tied up at 13–13 to a 27–13 lead by capitalizing on two turnovers. With 1:49 left to play, Ryder Werts fell on the ball in the end zone for a touchdown and kicker Steven Stewart made the extra point to put the Wildcats up by seven. Just 29 seconds later, Baker's Emmerson Clarke took a 48-yard interception return for a touchdown. Stewart's extra point put the score at 27–13. Ottawa managed a final touchdown with five seconds to go in the fourth quarter to put the final score at 27–20, with Baker recording the upset victory over the higher-ranked team.

Baker had two key players injured during and prior to the game. Morse's injury was somewhat of a repeat of the matchup in 2010, when he left the game due to a concussion. Just one week earlier, Junior Scott Meyer’s season ended from injury in a scrimmage game against Fort Scott Community College.

Ottawa began the game without offensive starter Matt Bollig, who suffered a career-ending injury during weightlifting practice in July.

==== Tabor at Bacone ====
| | 1 | 2 | 3 | 4 | Total |
|---|---|---|---|---|---|
| Tabor | 0 | 0 | 20 | 0 | **20** |
| **Bacone** | 10 | 3 | 12 | 0 | **25** |

Tabor traveled to Muskogee, Oklahoma for their game against Bacone for the second of two games in the conference for the week. Bacone coach Trevor Rubly began the game looking for his squad to improve over last year's statistics in turnovers beginning with this game. Last year Tabor completed a 3-7 overall record and 2-7 in conference play, but was picked to finish higher in both media and coaches conference poll.

Bacone managed to get off to an early start, scoring 10 points in the first quarter and leading at halftime 13–0. Tabor showed heart in the third quarter by scoring 20 points and made a good attempt at a comeback, but allowed Bacone to tack on an additional 12 to win the game 25–20.

=== Week 1 ===
| Date | Time | Visiting team | Home team | Site | TV | Result | Attendance | Ref. |
|---|---|---|---|---|---|---|---|---|
| August 30, 2012 | 6:00 PM | Southwestern | No. 10 **Northwestern (IA)** | DeValois Stadium • Orange City, Iowa | | **L** 0–49 | 2,347 | |
| September 1, 2012 | 11:30 AM | No. 14 **William Penn** | No. 0 Bethel | Thresher Stadium • North Newton, Kansas | | **L** 54–0 | – | |
| September 1, 2012 | 12:00 PM | Kansas Wesleyan | No. 22 **Cumberland** | Dyersburg High School • Dyersburg, Tennessee (Big River Bowl) | | **L** 20–31 | – | |
| September 1, 2012 | 1:00 PM | Sterling | No. 13 **Benedictine** | Larry Wilcox Stadium • Atchison, Kansas | | **L** 6–59 | – | |
| September 1, 2012 | 1:00 PM | Saint Mary | **Nebraska Wesleyan** | Abel Stadium • Lincoln, Nebraska | | **L** 20–25 | – | |
| September 1, 2012 | 6:00 PM | Friends | **Evangel** | JFK Stadium • Springfield, Missouri | | **L** 14–27 | – | |
| September 1, 2012 | 6:00 PM | No. 9 **Missouri Valley** | McPherson | McPherson Stadium • McPherson, Kansas | | **L** 27–13 | – | |
| September 1, 2012 | 6:00 PM | No. 24 **Bethany** | Southwestern Assemblies of God University | Lumpkins Stadium • Waxahachie, Texas | | **W** 13–12 | – | |
^{#}Rankings from NAIA Coaches' Poll. All times are in Central Time.

The games of week 1 produced only one non-conference victory with Bethany, who took sole possession of first place in the conference standings and a record of 1–0. All other teams in the conference concluded week 1 with a record of 0–0.

After week 1, the conference stood at 1–9 against non-conference opponents.

==== Southwestern at #10 Northwestern (IA) ====
| | 1 | 2 | 3 | 4 | Total |
|---|---|---|---|---|---|
| Southwestern | 0 | 0 | 0 | 0 | **0** |
| **#10 Northwestern (IA)** | 20 | 6 | 14 | 9 | **49** |

Tenth ranked Northwestern hosted the Southwestern College Moundbuilders on a Thursday night game in front of 2,347 fans. Southwestern entered the game with optimism of a victory and breaking a losing streak.

Northwestern dominated play the entire game. Head coach Kyle Achterhoff led his team to 649 yards and 7 touchdowns, averaging 7.1 yards per play while holding Southwestern to 156 yards and no points. Southwestern's Ceth Bannister managed a 64-yard punt in the game as a bright spot for Southwestern. The final score was 49–0 with Northwestern winning.

==== #14 William Penn at Bethel ====
| | 1 | 2 | 3 | 4 | Total |
|---|---|---|---|---|---|
| **#14 William Penn** | 29 | 9 | 13 | 3 | **54** |
| Bethel | 0 | 0 | 0 | 0 | **0** |

Bethel's interim coach James Dotson had just 41 players suited up for their season opener, against 14th-ranked William Penn. William Penn scored 29 points in the first quarter alone and dominated every aspect of the game. The Statesmen came into the game off a 39–14 victory over Iowa Wesleyan the previous week.

William Penn piled on 474 yards of total offense and seven touchdowns while holding Bethel to just 49 yards with no scores. The final score was 54–0.

==== Kansas Wesleyan at #22 Cumberland ====
| | 1 | 2 | 3 | 4 | Total |
|---|---|---|---|---|---|
| Kansas Wesleyan | 7 | 3 | 0 | 0 | **10** |
| **#22 Cumberland** | 7 | 7 | 7 | 10 | **31** |

Kansas Wesleyan met #22 Cumberland in the "Big River Bowl" hosted in Dyersburg, Tennessee, the first of two games played that day at the location.

Kansas Wesleyan secured 207 yards in the first half but only 45 in the second half of the game. Cumberland led 14–10 at halftime, and then began the third quarter with a 52-yard touchdown pass to Marquis Hagewood. Cumberland finished the game with 451 yards of total offense, including 317 on the ground. Cumberland claimed victory by a score of 31–10.

==== Sterling at #13 Benedictine ====
| | 1 | 2 | 3 | 4 | Total |
|---|---|---|---|---|---|
| Sterling | 0 | 0 | 6 | 0 | **6** |
| **#13 Benedictine** | 21 | 17 | 7 | 14 | **59** |

The Benedictine Ravens played host to the Sterling Warriors and dominated every aspect of the game.

The Ravens achieved 429 yards in total offense with eight touchdowns while Sterling earned just 265 and one touchdown. Sterling lost four fumbles and another interception while only making good on 3 of 14 third down situations. Benedictine lost two fumbles and zero interceptions while converting 6 of 11 third downs. The final score was Benedictine 59, Sterling 6.

==== Saint Mary at Nebraska Wesleyan ====
| | 1 | 2 | 3 | 4 | Total |
|---|---|---|---|---|---|
| Saint Mary | 7 | 7 | 0 | 6 | **20** |
| **Nebraska Wesleyan** | 0 | 7 | 16 | 2 | **25** |

Saint Mary's Jerrell Young caught a 9-yard pass from Mike Keese for a touchdown in the first quarter to get off to a 7–0 lead. Wesleyan's Nate Hauptman made good on a 1-yard run for a touchdown in the second quarter to tie up the score, but Saint Mary pulled ahead when Marcus Mata ran for a four-yard touchdown and Saint Mary went in at halftime with a 14–7 lead.

Saint Mary's top-flight passing attack helped give the Spires a 458-242 edge in total offense. Quarterback Mike Keese - who threw for 3,638 yards and 21 touchdowns a year ago - was 30-of-54 for 377 yards and two touchdowns.

Saint Mary still held a thin lead when Wesleayn's Nate Hauptman threw a 30-yard pass to Ryan Larsen for a touchdown because the extra point was blocked. Saint Mary held a 14–13 lead. But two more scores by Wesleyan in the third quarter made a difference, as Aaron Lorraine made a 31-yard field goal and Dustin Bryant scored on a 7 yard carry to end the third quarter 23–14.

Nebraska Wesleyan scored on three straight possessions in the second half and batted down a fourth-and-goal pass in the end zone to hold on for the win. Saint Mary attempt to come back in the fourth quarter fell short and Nebraska Wesleyan won 25–20.

==== Friends at Evangel ====
| | 1 | 2 | 3 | 4 | Total |
|---|---|---|---|---|---|
| Friends | 0 | 0 | 7 | 7 | **14** |
| **Evangel** | 7 | 7 | 3 | 10 | **27** |

Evangel began its season opener against Friends looking to bounce back from last season's record of 3–7, depending on their more experienced players such as pre-season second team all-American linebacker Tabor Cheo.

Evangel's Jesse Vaughn caught a 31-yard pass from Andrew Brimhal for a touchdown in the first quarter to take the lead and Evangel held the lead for the remainder of the game. Evangel's offense out-produced Friends 419 yards to 374, with three touchdowns to two by the Falcons. The final score was Friends 14, Evangel 27.

==== #9 Missouri Valley at McPherson ====
| | 1 | 2 | 3 | 4 | Total |
|---|---|---|---|---|---|
| **#9 Missouri Valley** | 3 | 7 | 7 | 10 | **27** |
| McPherson | 0 | 6 | 7 | 0 | **13** |

The lead changed five times when #9 Missouri Valley traveled to play McPherson. Missouri Valley achieved 377 yards of total offense and three touchdowns while McPherson nearly matched with 376 yards but only two touchdowns. McPherson was intercepted twice where Missouri Valley was not, but McPherson only committed one penalty to Missouri Valley's seven. In the end, Missouri Valley claimed victory 27–13.

==== #24 Bethany at Southwestern Assemblies of God ====
| | 1 | 2 | 3 | 4 | Total |
|---|---|---|---|---|---|
| **#24 Bethany** | 7 | 0 | 0 | 6 | **13** |
| Southwestern Assemblies of God | 3 | 3 | 3 | 3 | **12** |

Last season Southwestern Assemblies of God (SAGU) ended with a record of 4 wins and 6 losses. The team returned 13 starting players for the new season, including quarterback Reid Golson and running backs Sean Haynes and Cade Leuschner.

Bethany's Darby House managed to throw two touchdown passes to offset SAGU's four field goals. One touchdown pass was caught by Brandon Martino and the other by teammate D'Andre Thompson. The second to Thompson came with 37 seconds left in the game. It was just enough for a 13–12 victory.

=== Week 2 ===
| Date | Time | Visiting team | Home team | Site | TV | Result | Attendance | Ref. |
|---|---|---|---|---|---|---|---|---|
| September 8, 2012 | 6:00 PM | Bethel | **Southwestern** | Richard L. Jantz Stadium • Winfield, Kansas | | 13–27 | – | |
| September 8, 2012 | 7:00 PM | Sterling | **Tabor** | Joel Wiens Stadium • Hillsboro, Kansas | | 7–12 | – | |
| September 8, 2012 | 7:00 PM | Saint Mary | **Friends** | Adair-Austin Stadium • Wichita, Kansas | | 14–36 | – | |
| September 8, 2012 | 7:00 PM | No. 11 Ottawa | **Kansas Wesleyan** | Salina Stadium • Salina, Kansas | | 28–31 | – | |
| September 8, 2012 | 7:00 PM | **McPherson** | No. 24 Bethany | Lindstrom Field • Lindsborg, Kansas | | 14–0 | – | |
^{#}Rankings from NAIA Coaches' Poll. All times are in Central Time.

Week 2 was exclusively conference play. Two teams entered the week ranked: Ottawa at #11 and Bethany at #24. When the week was over, both Ottawa and Bethany were dropped from the rankings due to losses and other conference teams managed to earn a ranking.

==== #11 Ottawa at Kansas Wesleyan ====
| | 1 | 2 | 3 | 4 | Total |
|---|---|---|---|---|---|
| #11 Ottawa | 7 | 7 | 7 | 7 | **28** |
| **Kansas Wesleyan** | 17 | 0 | 14 | 0 | **31** |

Underdog Kansas Wesleyan ended the first quarter with a 17–7 lead and held it for the remainder of the game, although 11th-ranked Ottawa did manage to work up what looked like a comeback. Ottawa's offense achieved 512 total yards and held Kansas Wesleyan to 327 and four touchdowns apiece. The difference came down to kicking, as Kansas Wesleyan's Terry Stecker managed a field goal to put the Coyotes far enough ahead to keep the victory. Final score: Kansas Wesleyan 31, Ottawa 28.

==== McPherson at #24 Bethany ====
| | 1 | 2 | 3 | 4 | Total |
|---|---|---|---|---|---|
| **McPherson** | 0 | 7 | 0 | 7 | **14** |
| #24 Bethany | 0 | 0 | 0 | 0 | **0** |

Only two touchdowns came in the game between McPherson and Bethany in the home opener for the Terrible Sweedes, and both of those touchdowns were achieved by McPherson. The first one came with just thirteen seconds left in the second quarter when Havelock Pomele made a 2-yard run to score, and Cord Cunningham converted the extra point to put the score to 7–0. The second touchdown, also by Pomele was a 13-yard run with 14:53 left in the fourth quarter. Cunningham made good on the extra point for the second time and the result was a McPherson upset over #24 Bethany by a score of 14–0.

=== Week 3 ===
| Date | Time | Visiting team | Home team | Site | TV | Result | Attendance | Ref. |
|---|---|---|---|---|---|---|---|---|
| September 15, 2012 | 6:00 PM | Saint Mary | **Ottawa** | Peoples Bank Field • Ottawa, Kansas | | 42–50 | – | |
| September 15, 2012 | 6:00 PM | **Kansas Wesleyan** | Sterling | Smisor Stadium • Sterling, Kansas (Warriorfest) | | 14–10 | – | |
| September 15, 2012 | 7:00 PM | **Bethany** | Bethel | Thresher Stadium • North Newton, Kansas | | 16–0 | – | |
| September 15, 2012 | 7:00 PM | Haskell | **Tabor** | Joel Wiens Stadium • Hillsboro, Kansas | | 7–56 | – | |
| September 15, 2012 | 7:00 PM | Southwestern | **McPherson** | McPherson Stadium • McPherson, Kansas | | 21–40 | – | |
^{#}Rankings from NAIA Coaches' Poll. All times are in Central Time.

=== Week 4 ===
| Date | Time | Visiting team | Home team | Site | TV | Result | Attendance | Ref. |
|---|---|---|---|---|---|---|---|---|
| September 22, 2012 | 1:30 PM | **Tabor** | Saint Mary | Saint Mary Field • Leavenworth, Kansas | | 44–37 | – | |
| September 22, 2012 | 6:00 PM | Sterling | **Southwestern** | Richard L. Jantz Stadium • Winfield, Kansas | | 6–30 | – | |
| September 22, 2012 | 7:00 PM | No. 24 **Kansas Wesleyan** | Bethany | Lindstrom Field • Lindsborg, Kansas | | 33–31 | – | |
| September 22, 2012 | 7:00 PM | **Friends** | McPherson | McPherson Stadium • McPherson, Kansas | | 18–17 | – | |
^{#}Rankings from NAIA Coaches' Poll. All times are in Central Time.

=== Week 5 ===
| Date | Time | Visiting team | Home team | Site | TV | Result | Attendance | Ref. |
|---|---|---|---|---|---|---|---|---|
| September 29, 2012 | 2:00 PM | Avila | **Bethany** | Lindstrom Field • Lindsborg, Kansas | | **W** 1–0 forfeit | – | |
| September 29, 2012 | 6:00 PM | **Saint Mary** | Sterling | Smisor Stadium • Sterling, Kansas | | 21–20 ^{1 OT} | – | |
| September 29, 2012 | 6:00 PM | Friends | No. 23 **Kansas Wesleyan** | Salina Stadium • Salina, Kansas | | 24–28 | – | |
| September 29, 2012 | 7:00 PM | **Ottawa** | Tabor | Joel Wiens Stadium • Hillsboro, Kansas | | 25–21 | – | |
| September 29, 2012 | 7:00 PM | **Southwestern** | Haskell Indian Nations Fighting Indians | Haskell Stadium • Lawrence, Kansas | | 38–12 | – | |
| September 29, 2012 | 7:00 PM | **McPherson** | Bethel | Thresher Stadium • North Newton, Kansas | | 61–9 | – | |
^{#}Rankings from NAIA Coaches' Poll. All times are in Central Time.

==== Avila vs. Bethany ====
Avila and Bethany played their game as scheduled and Avila outscored Bethany by a score of 35–19. Avila would later forfeit the victory due to the use of an ineligible player.

=== Week 6 ===
| Date | Time | Visiting team | Home team | Site | TV | Result | Attendance | Ref. |
|---|---|---|---|---|---|---|---|---|
| October 6, 2012 | 1:30 PM | Bethany | **Saint Mary** | Saint Mary Field • Leavenworth, Kansas | | 20–34 | – | |
| October 6, 2012 | 1:30 PM | Bethel | **Friends** | Adair-Austin Stadium • Wichita, Kansas | | 6–44 | – | |
| October 6, 2012 | 2:00 PM | No. 20 Kansas Wesleyan | **Tabor** | Joel Wiens Stadium • Hillsboro, Kansas | | 31–56 | – | |
| October 6, 2012 | 7:00 PM | Southwestern | **Ottawa** | Peoples Bank Field • Ottawa, Kansas | | 21–40 | – | |
^{#}Rankings from NAIA Coaches' Poll. All times are in Central Time.

=== Week 7 ===
| Date | Time | Visiting team | Home team | Site | TV | Result | Attendance | Ref. |
|---|---|---|---|---|---|---|---|---|
| October 13, 2012 | 1:30 PM | No. 24 **Tabor** | Bethany | Lindstrom Field • Lindsborg, Kansas | | 44–7 | – | |
| October 13, 2012 | 1:30 PM | No. 25 Friends | **Southwestern** | Richard L. Jantz Stadium • Winfield, Kansas | | 21–32 | – | |
| October 13, 2012 | 1:30 PM | No. 5 **William Penn** | Saint Mary | Saint Mary Field • Leavenworth, Kansas | | **L** 53–14 | – | |
| October 13, 2012 | 7:00 PM | **Sterling** | Bethel | Thresher Stadium • North Newton, Kansas (Fall Fest) | | 49–0 | – | |
| October 13, 2012 | 7:00 PM | **Southern Nazarene** | Kansas Wesleyan | Salina Stadium • Salina, Kansas | | **L** 44–19 | – | |
| October 13, 2012 | 7:00 PM | McPherson | **Ottawa** | Peoples Bank Field • Ottawa, Kansas | | 14–38 | – | |
^{#}Rankings from NAIA Coaches' Poll. All times are in Central Time.

=== Week 8 ===
| Date | Time | Visiting team | Home team | Site | TV | Result | Attendance | Ref. |
|---|---|---|---|---|---|---|---|---|
| October 20, 2012 | 1:30 PM | No. 22 Tabor | McPherson | McPherson Stadium • McPherson, Kansas | | cancelled | N/A | |
| October 20, 2012 | 1:30 PM | Southwestern | **Saint Mary** | Saint Mary Field • Leavenworth, Kansas | | 7–45 | – | |
| October 20, 2012 | 1:30 PM | Bethel | **Kansas Wesleyan** | Salina Stadium • Salina, Kansas | | 12–51 | – | |
| October 20, 2012 | 1:30 PM | **Ottawa** | Sterling | Smisor Stadium • Sterling, Kansas | | 38–21 | – | |
| October 20, 2012 | 3:00 PM | Bethany | **Friends** | Adair-Austin Stadium • Wichita, Kansas | | 7–43 | – | |
^{#}Rankings from NAIA Coaches' Poll. All times are in Central Time.

==== #22 Tabor vs. McPherson - cancelled ====
Brandon Brown

On October 4, 2012, the KCAC and presidents of McPherson and Tabor agreed to cancel their game scheduled for October 20, 2012. The game was cancelled in light of the ongoing investigation into the murder of Tabor football player Brandon Brown. The two suspected of committing the murder are former football players from McPherson College.

===== Aftermath =====
Two former players from McPherson's team have been charged with the murder: Alton Franklin and Dequinte Oshea Flournoy. Both were on the football roster at McPherson for the previous year, and Franklin was listed as a sophomore linebacker at the beginning of the 2012 season. He was dismissed from the team before the incident and Flournoy was also no longer a member of the team.

Michael Schneider, President of McPherson College said that McPherson and Tabor colleges do not have a rivalry that would account for what happened.

===== Preliminary hearing =====
Investigation of the crime was handled in cooperation by the McPherson Police Department, the McPherson County Sheriff's Office, and the Kansas Bureau of Investigation.

After a preliminary hearing on January 31, 2013, the suspects Franklin and Flournoy were bound over for trial on charges of being accessories to second-degree murder.

The McPherson County Medical Examiner testified that Brown's blood alcohol level was .30, well above the legal limit in the state of Kansas. Attorneys for the defense argued that their actions were self-defense, saying "The defendants were using force to try to remove them from the premises." David Harger, Franklin's attorney continued, "Those people were armed. They then, as we know from police, stabbed the door with a knife."

Both Franklin and Flournoy entered a plea of not guilty.

===== Plea bargain & trial =====
DeQuinte Flournoy later changed his position and entered a plea of no contest to a reduced charge of felony aggravated battery. A third former McPherson player testified that Franklin struck Brown in the face and Flournoy held Brown down. At the time, Flournoy was expected to testify at Franklin's trial.

The jury deliberated less than two hours before delivering a verdict of not guilty of second-degree murder for Alton Franklin. Franklin was released after being held since September. Reactions from the community were left wanting more details and seeking understanding about the results.

=== Week 9 ===
| Date | Time | Visiting team | Home team | Site | TV | Result | Attendance | Ref. |
|---|---|---|---|---|---|---|---|---|
| October 27, 2012 | 1:30 PM | Bethel | No. 22 **Tabor** | Joel Wiens Stadium • Hillsboro, Kansas | | 6–75 | – | |
| October 27, 2012 | 1:30 PM | **Kansas Wesleyan** | Southwestern | Richard L. Jantz Stadium • Winfield, Kansas | | 35–17 | – | |
| October 27, 2012 | 1:30 PM | Sterling | **Friends** | Adair-Austin Stadium • Wichita, Kansas (Senior Day) | | 0–21 | – | |
| October 27, 2012 | 1:30 PM | Bethany | No. 24 **Ottawa** | Peoples Bank Field • Ottawa, Kansas | | 0–56 | – | |
| October 27, 2012 | 1:30 PM | **Saint Mary** | McPherson | McPherson Stadium • McPherson, Kansas (Senior Day) | | 26–14 | – | |
^{#}Rankings from NAIA Coaches' Poll. All times are in Central Time.

=== Week 10 ===
| Date | Time | Visiting team | Home team | Site | TV | Result | Attendance | Ref. |
|---|---|---|---|---|---|---|---|---|
| November 3, 2012 | 1:30 PM | No. 20 **Tabor** | Southwestern | Richard L. Jantz Stadium • Winfield, Kansas | | 51–27 | – | |
| November 3, 2012 | 1:30 PM | **Saint Mary** | Bethel | Thresher Stadium • North Newton, Kansas | | 86–6 | – | |
| November 3, 2012 | 1:30 PM | **Sterling** | Bethany | Lindstrom Field • Lindsborg, Kansas | | 17–10 | – | |
| November 3, 2012 | 1:30 PM | **McPherson** | No. 23 Kansas Wesleyan | Salina Stadium • Salina, Kansas | | 28–24 | – | |
| November 3, 2012 | 1:30 PM | Friends | No. 19 **Ottawa** | Peoples Bank Field • Ottawa, Kansas | | 3–35 | – | |
^{#}Rankings from NAIA Coaches' Poll. All times are in Central Time.

=== Week 11 ===
| Date | Time | Visiting team | Home team | Site | TV | Result | Attendance | Ref. |
|---|---|---|---|---|---|---|---|---|
| November 10, 2012 | 1:30 PM | Friends | No. 17 **Tabor** | Joel Wiens Stadium • Hillsboro, Kansas (Senior Day) | | 3–31 | – | |
| November 10, 2012 | 1:30 PM | Southwestern | **Bethany** | Lindstrom Field • Lindsborg, Kansas (Senior Day) | | 26–37 | – | |
| November 10, 2012 | 1:30 PM | **McPherson** | Sterling | Smisor Stadium • Sterling, Kansas (0) | | 23–21 | – | |
| November 10, 2012 | 1:30 PM | Kansas Wesleyan | **Saint Mary** | Saint Mary Field • Leavenworth, Kansas | | 23–38 | – | |
| November 10, 2012 | 1:30 PM | No. 16 **Ottawa** | Bethel | Thresher Stadium • North Newton, Kansas | | 51–6 | – | |
^{#}Rankings from NAIA Coaches' Poll. All times are in Central Time.

== Postseason ==
Conference regular season champion Ottawa earned an invitation to the 2012 NAIA Football National Championship and was the only team in the conference to be invited. No other team achieved post-season play.

=== First round ===
| Date | Time | Visiting team | Home team | Site | TV | Result | Attendance | Ref. |
|---|---|---|---|---|---|---|---|---|
| 41230 | | Ottawa | Missouri Valley | Gregg-Mitchell Field • Marshall, Missouri (NAIA FCS First Round) | | 24–42 | – | |
^{#}Rankings from NAIA Coaches' Poll. All times are in Central Time.

==== #15 Ottawa (KS) at #2 Missouri Valley ====
| | 1 | 2 | 3 | 4 | Total |
|---|---|---|---|---|---|
| #15 Ottawa (KS) | 0 | 7 | 7 | 7 | 21 |
| #2 Missouri Valley | 15 | 15 | 7 | 19 | 56 |

Missouri Valley finished the regular season with its third consecutive conference championship and an undefeated 10–0 record, while Ottawa entered into the game with its second consecutive conference championship and a record of 8–2. Missouri Valley earned the home field advantage for the first round.

Missouri Valley scored 15 points in the first quarter and held Ottawa to zero, and held that lead for the entire game. Missouri Valley averaged 6.9 yards per play while holding Ottawa to 2.7. Missouri Valley's 487 total yards was made up of 229 yards rushing and 258 passing. With 13:46 left in the second quarter, Ottawa scored and managed to bring the score within eight points, but Missouri Valley pulled further away to a victorious final score of 56–21.

== Player and coach awards ==
At the end the regular season play, the conference granted multiple individual and team awards. Ottawa University was declared conference champion and the Tabor Bluejays were declared runner-up.

Ottawa's Shane Gimzo was awarded the Player of the Year. Mike Keese of Saint Mary was awarded Offensive Player of the Year and Defensive Player of the Year went to Donald Anderson of Ottawa. Friends University's Derek Racette earns Special Teams Player of the Year and Jordan Barrett of Southwestern College was named the "Dr. Ted Kessinger Champion of Character Award" recipient. Mike Gardner of Tabor was declared the conference Coach of the Year.
