= 2011 Saint Xavier Cougars football team =

American college football season

2011 Saint Xavier Cougars football

NAIA national champion

NAIA National Championship Game, W 24–20 vs. Carroll (MT)
- Conference: Mid-States Football Association
- Mideast League
- Record: 14–1 (4–1 MSFA)
- Head coach: Mike Feminis (13th season)
- Home stadium: Deaton Field

2011 Mid-States Football Association standings
	Conf.			Overall
Team	W		L	W		L
Mideast League
No. 3 Marian (IN) x^	5	–	0	12	–	1
No. 1 Saint Xavier ^	4	–	1	14	–	1
No. 7 Saint Francis (IN) ^	3	–	2	9	–	3
Taylor	2	–	3	5	–	5
Quincy	1	–	4	4	–	6
Concordia (MI)	0	–	5	0	–	11
Midwest League
No. 8 St. Francis (IL) x^	6	–	1	10	–	3
No. 18 Grand View x^	6	–	1	8	–	4
No. 15 William Penn	5	–	2	9	–	2
No. 22 St. Ambrose	5	–	2	7	–	3
Olivet Nazarene	3	–	4	5	–	6
Iowa Wesleyan	2	–	5	3	–	7
Trinity International	1	–	6	2	–	8
Waldorf	0	–	7	2	–	9
x – League champion/co-champions ^ – NAIA playoff participant; Rankings from NAIA Coaches' Poll

The 2011 Saint Xavier Cougars football team was an American football team that represented Saint Xavier University as a member of the Mideast League of the Mid-States Football Association (MSFA) during the 2011 NAIA football season. In their 13th season under head coach Mike Feminis, the Cougars compiled a 14–1 record and won the NAIA national championship, defeating Carroll (Montana), 24–20, in the NAIA National Championship Game.

The team ran a no-huddle spread offense that led the NAIA with an average of 45.9 points per game. The national championship was the first for a Chicago college team in nearly a century (dating to the 1913 Chicago Maroons football team).

Key players included quarterback Jimmy Coy, running back Nick Pesek, kicker Tom Lynch (two-time winner of the Fred Mitchell Outstanding Place Kicker Award), and brothers Ryan Fejedelem (linebacker) and Clayton Fejedelem (safety).

The Saint Xavier football program was established 18 years earlier in 1993. Coach Feminis played linebacker on the first Saint Francis team. The entire athletic budget for Saint Francis was $3.9 million with 24 scholarships shared among 88 players.

== Schedule ==
Date	Time	Opponent	Rank	Site	Result	Attendance	Source
September 3	6:00 p.m.	Olivet Nazarene*	No. 2	Deaton Field; Chicago, IL	W 55–10	1,600	
September 10	4:00 p.m.	at No. 24 St. Francis (IL)*	No. 2	Joliet Memorial Stadium; Joliet, IL	W 34–20	3,000	
September 17	6:00 p.m.	Walsh*	No. 1	Deaton Field; Chicago, IL	W 55–30	2,300	
September 24	6:00 p.m.	Trinity International*	No. 1	Deaton Field; Chicago, IL	W 49–14	3,000	
October 1	11:00 a.m.	at No. 2 Saint Francis (IN)	No. 1	Bishop John M. D'Arcy Stadium; Fort Wayne, IN	W 42–31	4,000	
October 8	3:00 p.m.	at Malone*	No. 1	Fawcett Stadium; Canton, OH	W 52–10	2,200	
October 15	1:00 p.m.	Quincy	No. 1	Deaton Field; Chicago, IL	W 48–14	3,000	
October 22	1:00 p.m.	Taylor	No. 1	Deaton Field; Chicago, IL	W 75–33	2,700	
October 29	12:00 p.m.	at Concordia (MI)	No. 1	River Bank Stadium; Ann Arbor, MI	W 63–3	478	
November 5	12:00 p.m.	at No. 2 Marian (IN)	No. 5	St.V Health Field; Indianapolis, IN	L 9–27	5,175	
November 12	12:00 p.m.	Jamestown*	No. 5	Deaton Field; Chicago, IL	W 50–14	1,400	
November 19	1:00 p.m.	No. 13 Bethel (TN)*	No. 5	Deaton Field; Chicago, IL (NAIA First Round)	W 51–13	3,000	
November 26	1:00 p.m.	at No. 4 MidAmerica Nazarene*	No. 5	Pioneer Stadium; Olathe, KS (NAIA Quarterfinal)	W 29–14		
December 3	12:00 p.m.	at No. 1 Marian (IN)*	No. 5	St. Vincent Health Field; Indianapolis, IN (NAIA Semifinal)	W 30–27	4,270	
December 17	3:30 p.m.	vs. No. 2 Carroll (MT)*	No. 5	Barron Stadium; Rome, GA (NAIA Championship Game)	W 24–20	5,917	
*Non-conference game; Rankings from NAIA Poll released prior to the game; All times are in Central time
