= 2011 college football season =

The 2011 college football season may refer to:

- 2011 NCAA Division I FBS football season
- 2011 NCAA Division I FCS football season
- 2011 NCAA Division II football season
- 2011 NCAA Division III football season
- 2011 NAIA Football National Championship
