= 2011 NAIA football season =

American college football season

- National Championship: Barron Stadium; Rome, GA; December 17, 2011
- Champion: Saint Xavier
- Player of the Year: Chance Demarais (running back, Carroll (MT))

The 2011 NAIA football season was the component of the 2011 college football season organized by the National Association of Intercollegiate Athletics (NAIA) in the United States. The season's playoffs, known as the NAIA Football National Championship, culminated with the championship game on December 17, at Barron Stadium in Rome, Georgia. The Saint Xavier Cougars defeated the Carroll Fighting Saints, 24–20, in the title game to win the program's first NAIA championship.

== Conference standings ==
2011 Central States Football League standings
	Conf.			Overall
Team	W		L	W		L
No. 12 Southern Nazarene +^	4	–	1	9	–	3
No. 23 Langston +	4	–	1	7	–	3
Bacone	3	–	2	5	–	6
NW Oklahoma State	3	–	2	4	–	6
SAGU	1	–	4	4	–	6
Texas College	0	–	5	0	–	11
+ – Conference co-champions; ^ – NAIA playoff participant; Rankings from NAIA Coaches' Poll

2011 Dakota Athletic Conference football standings
	Conf.			Overall
Team	W		L	W		L
No. 16 Valley City State $^	6	–	0	9	–	2
Dickinson State	3	–	3	4	–	6
Jamestown	2	–	4	3	–	7
Mayville State	1	–	5	5	–	6
$ – Conference champion; ^ – NAIA playoff participant; Rankings from NAIA Coaches' Poll

2011 Frontier Conference football standings
	Conf.			Overall
Team	W		L	W		L
No. 2 Carroll (MT) $^	9	–	1	13	–	2
No. 20 Eastern Oregon	8	–	2	8	–	3
Montana State–Northern	5	–	5	5	–	5
Rocky Mountain	4	–	6	5	–	6
Montana Tech	2	–	8	3	–	8
Montana Western	2	–	8	2	–	9
$ – Conference champion; ^ – NAIA playoff participant; Rankings from NAIA Coaches' Poll

2011 Great Plains Athletic Conference football standings
	Conf.			Overall
Team	W		L	W		L
No. 9 Morningside $^	8	–	1	9	–	2
No. 17 Northwestern (IA)	7	–	2	9	–	2
No. 19 Doane	7	–	2	8	–	2
Dakota Wesleyan	5	–	4	6	–	4
Hastings	5	–	4	6	–	4
Midland	5	–	4	6	–	4
Nebraska Wesleyan	4	–	5	5	–	5
Concordia (NE)	3	–	6	4	–	7
Briar Cliff	1	–	8	2	–	9
Dordt	0	–	9	2	–	9
$ – Conference champion; ^ – NAIA playoff participant; Rankings from NAIA Coaches' Poll

2011 Heart of America Athletic Conference football standings
	Conf.			Overall
Team	W		L	W		L
No. 6 MidAmerica Nazarene +^	8	–	1	10	–	2
No. 10 Missouri Valley +^	8	–	1	9	–	2
No. 13 Benedictine (KS) ^	7	–	2	9	–	3
No. 21 Baker	6	–	3	7	–	3
Central Methodist	5	–	4	5	–	5
Avila	4	–	5	4	–	6
Evangel	3	–	6	3	–	7
Peru State	2	–	7	2	–	8
Graceland	1	–	8	1	–	9
Culver–Stockton	1	–	8	1	–	10
+ – Conference co-champions; ^ – NAIA playoff participant; Rankings from NAIA Coaches' Poll

2011 Kansas Collegiate Athletic Conference football standings
	Conf.			Overall
Team	W		L	W		L
No. 11 Ottawa $^	9	–	0	9	–	2
Saint Mary (KS)	7	–	2	7	–	4
Bethany (KS)	6	–	3	8	–	3
Friends	5	–	4	5	–	5
Kansas Wesleyan	5	–	4	5	–	6
Southwestern (KS)	4	–	5	5	–	6
McPherson	4	–	5	4	–	7
Tabor	2	–	7	3	–	7
Bethel (KS)	2	–	7	2	–	9
Sterling	1	–	8	1	–	10
$ – Conference champion; ^ – NAIA playoff participant; Rankings from NAIA Coaches' Poll

2011 Mid-South Conference football standings
	Conf.			Overall
Team	W		L	W		L
East Division
No. 4 Georgetown (KY) x^	5	–	0	12	–	1
Lindsey Wilson	3	–	2	7	–	3
Campbellsville	3	–	2	7	–	5
Kentucky Christian	2	–	3	4	–	7
Virginia–Wise	1	–	4	5	–	6
Pikeville	1	–	4	4	–	6
West Division
No. 14 Bethel (TN) x^	5	–	1	8	–	3
No. 25 Cumberland (TN)	4	–	2	7	–	3
No. 24 Cumberlands (KY)	4	–	2	7	–	3
Shorter	3	–	3	6	–	4
Belhaven	3	–	3	5	–	6
Faulkner	1	–	5	3	–	7
Union (KY)	1	–	5	2	–	9
x – Division champion/co-champions; ^ – NAIA playoff participant; Rankings from NAIA Coaches' Poll

2011 Mid-States Football Association standings
	Conf.			Overall
Team	W		L	W		L
Mideast League
No. 3 Marian (IN) x^	5	–	0	12	–	1
No. 1 Saint Xavier ^	4	–	1	14	–	1
No. 7 Saint Francis (IN) ^	3	–	2	9	–	3
Taylor	2	–	3	5	–	5
Quincy	1	–	4	4	–	6
Concordia (MI)	0	–	5	0	–	11
Midwest League
No. 8 St. Francis (IL) x^	6	–	1	10	–	3
No. 18 Grand View x^	6	–	1	8	–	4
No. 15 William Penn	5	–	2	9	–	2
No. 22 St. Ambrose	5	–	2	7	–	3
Olivet Nazarene	3	–	4	5	–	6
Iowa Wesleyan	2	–	5	3	–	7
Trinity International	1	–	6	2	–	8
Waldorf	0	–	7	2	–	9
x – League champion/co-champions ^ – NAIA playoff participant; Rankings from NAIA Coaches' Poll

2011 NAIA independents football records
	Conf.			Overall
Team	W		L	W		L
No. 16 Valley City State ^		–		9	–	2
No. 5 Azusa Pacific ^		–		9	–	3
Menlo		–		5	–	5
Southern Oregon		–		5	–	5
Mayville State		–		5	–	6
Walsh		–		5	–	6
Dickinson State		–		4	–	6
Edward Waters		–		4	–	6
Malone		–		4	–	7
Robert Morris (IL)		–		4	–	6
Webber International		–		4	–	6
Jamestown		–		3	–	7
Southern Virginia		–		2	–	7
West Virginia Tech		–		1	–	9
Dakota State		–		1	–	10
Ave Maria		–		0	–	9
Haskell		–		0	–	11
^ – NAIA playoff participant; Rankings from NAIA Coaches' Poll
