= Mike Craven =

Mike Craven may refer to:

- Mike Craven (footballer) (born 1957), former English footballer
- Mike Craven (American football), American football coach in the United States
