= 2011 NAIA football national championship =

2011 Russell Athletic NAIA Football National Championship
Saint Xavier Cougars	Carroll Fighting Saints
(13–1)	(13–1)
24	20
Head coach: Mike Feminis	Head coach: Mike Van Diest
Coaches 5	Coaches 2
	1	2	3	4	Total
Saint Xavier	10	7	7	0	24
Carroll	0	14	6	0	20
- Date: December 17, 2011
- Season: 2011
- Stadium: Barron Stadium
- Location: Rome, Georgia
- MVP: Stephen Hammer, Saint Xavier (Offense), Patrick Appino Saint Xavier (Defense)
- Attendance: 5,917

United States TV coverage
- Network: CBS College Sports Network
- Announcers: Andy Demetra (Play By Play); Doug Chapman (Color Analysis); Peter Young (Sideline Report)

The 2011 NAIA football national championship was played on December 17, 2011, as the 56th Annual Russell Athletic NAIA Football National Championship.

The championship game was played at Barron Stadium in Rome, Georgia. The game featured the Saint Xavier Cougars, playing in the title match for the first time. Their opponent was the Carroll Fighting Saints, the defending national champion who was appearing in the title game for the 8th time in the past 10 years. Carroll was attempting to win a record-tying 7th national title. In a tightly played contest, Saint Xavier prevailed, 24–20.

A total of sixteen teams participated in a single-elimination tournament from across the country. Placement in the tournament was based on the final edition of the NAIA Coaches' Poll with the exception of #16 William Penn and #17 Northwestern (IA) being passed over for #18 Grand View, who qualified by winning the Mid-States Football Association Division Championship.

Two teams represented schools named for "Saint Francis"—one team from St. Francis (IL) and the other from Saint Francis (IN).

== Scoring summary ==
Scoring summary

Quarter	Time	Drive			Team	Scoring information	Score	
Quarter	Time	Plays	Yards	TOP	Team	Scoring information	Saint Xavier Cougars	Carroll Fighting Saints
1	10:33	15	71	4:27	Saint Xavier Cougars	20-yard field goal by Tom Lynch	3	0
1	1:43	15	95	3:51	Saint Xavier Cougars	Jimmy Coy 8-yard touchdown run, Tom Lynch kick Good	10	0
2	5:17	10	62	5:43	Carroll Fighting Saints	Matt Ritter 20-yard touchdown reception from Dane Broadhead, Tom Yaremko kick Good	10	7
2	1:22	9	49	3:55	Saint Xavier Cougars	Shane Zackery 11-yard touchdown reception from Jimmy Coy, Tom Lynch kick Good	17	7
2	0:39	4	57	0:43	Carroll Fighting Saints	Anthony Clarke 26-yard touchdown reception from Dane Broadhead, Tom Yaremko kick Good	17	14
3	14:45	-	-	-	Carroll Fighting Saints	Jared Mayernik 94 yard Kickoff return touchdown, Tom Yaremko Kick Blocked	17	20
3	11:45	11	67	3:00	Saint Xavier Cougars	KJ Franklin 4-yard touchdown run, Tom Lynch kick Good	24	20
"TOP" = time of possession. For other American football terms, see Glossary of American football.							Saint Xavier Cougars	Carroll Fighting Saints

== Tournament bracket ==
1st Round; November 19
2	Carroll (MT) (10–1)	47
12	Valley City State (9–1)	0
8	Azusa Pacific (8–2)	49
10	Ottawa (KS) (9–2)	26
3	Georgetown (KY) (10–0)	21
15	Benedictine (9–2)	7
7	Missouri Valley (9–1)	14
9	Saint Francis (IN) (8–2)	28
1	Marian (IN) (10–0)	31
18	Grand View (8–3)	0
6	Morningside (9–1)	17
11	St. Francis (IL) (9–2)	21
4	MidAmerica Nazarene (9–1)	40
14	Southern Nazarene (9–2)	28
5	Saint Xavier (IL) (10–1)	51
13	Bethel (TN) (8–2)	13

Quarterfinals; November 26
2	Carroll (MT)	17
8	Azusa Pacific	14
3	Georgetown (KY)	26
9	Saint Francis (IN)	14
1	Marian (IN)	49
11	St. Francis (IL)	7
4	MidAmerica Nazarene	14
5	Saint Xavier (IL)	29

Semifinals; December 3
2	Carroll (MT)	35
3	Georgetown (KY)	3
1	Marian (IN)	27
5	Saint Xavier (IL)	30

Championship; December 17
2	Carroll (MT)	20
5	Saint Xavier (IL)	24

- * denotes OT.

== Game details ==
=== First round ===
==== #18 Grand View vs #1 Marian ====
	1	2	3	4	Total
#18 Grand View	0	0	0	0	0
#1 Marian	10	14	7	0	31

Top-ranked Marian defeated Grand View 31–0. Marian scored 10 points in the first quarter and kept their opponent from scoring any points on their way to the shutout. Marian put down 392 yards of total offense and held Grand View to a mere 41.

==== #11 St. Francis (IL) vs #6 Morningside ====
	1	2	3	4	Total
#11 St. Francis (IL)	7	7	0	7	21
#6 Morningside	10	0	7	0	17

St. Francis (IL) defeated Morningside 21–17 in the first round.

==== #14 Southern Nazarene vs. #4 MidAmerica Nazarene ====
	1	2	3	4	Total
#14 Southern Nazarene	0	7	7	14	28
#4 MidAmerica Nazarene	13	7	7	13	40

MidAmerica Nazarene and Southern Nazarene began their national title hopes in the first round on November 19, 2011. Both teams met previously this season during week 7 on October 15. MidAmerica has a 5–8 record in postseason play and Southern Nazarene is in their first postseason game.

MidAmerica Nazarene and Southern Nazarene began their national title hopes in the first round on November 19, 2011. MidAmerica Nazarene took the lead in the first quarter when Sean Ransburg managed a 33-yard run for a touchdown and held the lead for the remainder of the game, including Kyle Cobb's 50 yard interception for a touchdown in the second quarter.

Southern Nazarene managed several scores along the way, including Jarod Martin catching a 64-yard pass from Brady Wardlaw for a touchdown.

==== #13 Bethel (TN) vs #5 Saint Xavier ====
	1	2	3	4	Total
#13 Bethel (TN)	6	7	0	0	13
#5 Saint Xavier	21	14	9	7	51

Saint Xavier defeated Bethel (TN) 51–13 in the first round. Saint Xavier scored the most points of any team in a single game for the sixteen-team playoff. Saint Xavier took the lead in the first quarter and held it for the entire game, aided by 21 points total in the first quarter alone. Saint Xavier scored a total of seven touchdowns and held Bethel to two, with the final score 51–13.

==== #12 Valley City State vs #2 Carroll (MT) ====
	1	2	3	4	Total
#12 Valley City State	0	0	0	0	0
#2 Carroll (MT)	13	14	20	0	47

Carroll defeated Valley City State 47–0. This was the largest margin of victory for the playoff.

==== #10 Ottawa vs. #8 Azusa Pacific ====
	1	2	3	4	Total
#10 Ottawa	6	7	7	6	26
#8 Azusa Pacific	21	7	21	0	49

Ottawa University (from the Kansas Collegiate Athletic Conference) completed the regular season ranked #10 and was invited to play #8 Azusa Pacific. Azusa Pacific won in the first round by a score of 49–26. Ottawa managed to gain 359 yards of total offense but gave up 587 yards to the Cougars. Ottawa made most of their yards passing, but gave up four interceptions in the process.

==== #15 Benedictine vs. #3 Georgetown (KY) ====
	1	2	3	4	Total
#15 Benedictine	7	0	0	0	7
#3 Georgetown (KY)	7	7	0	7	21

Benedictine started quick when Nick Rudolph ran a 22-yard interception for a touchdown and the first score of the game after only 21 seconds had expired. His touchdown and Zach Keenan's extra point were the only scores for Benedictine while Georgetown managed three touchdowns.

After accumulating 366 yards of total offense and holding Benedictine to 278, Georgetown won the game—final score: 7–21.

==== #9 Saint Francis (IN) vs. #7 Missouri Valley ====
	1	2	3	4	Total
#9 Saint Francis (IN)	7	7	0	14	28
#7 Missouri Valley	7	0	7	0	14

Missouri Valley entered the first round with a record of 9–1 and as the champions of the Heart of America Athletic Conference. Saint Francis came with a record of 8–2 and has won eight-straight First Round games in previous years.

Saint Francis scored first and last in their first-round game against Missouri Valley, with a total of four touchdowns for the game. It was enough to record a win on the road by a score of 28–14.

=== Quarterfinals ===
==== #11 St. Francis (IL) vs #1 Marian ====
	1	2	3	4	Total
#11 St. Francis	0	0	0	7	7
#1 Marian	7	14	14	14	49

Top-ranked Marian rolled past St. Francis of Illinois, having taken the lead in the first quarter and held it through the entire game. St. Francis was only able to score one touchdown while Marian made seven—aided by an average of 8.7 yards per play.

Marian easily defeated St. Francis 49–7.

==== #5 Saint Xavier vs. #4 MidAmerica Nazarene ====
	1	2	3	4	Total
#5 Saint Xavier	6	7	0	16	29
#4 MidAmerica Nazarene	0	7	0	7	14

Saint Xavier's Wes Gastel caught a 9-yard pass from Jimmy Coy for six points in the first quarter to take the lead. His team held that until the fourth quarter when MidAmerica started to mount a comeback as Austin Conyers caught a 65-yard pass from Tyler Herl for a touchdown and MidAmerica took the lead by a score of 13–14. Less than a minute and a half later, Saint Xavier took the lead back and held it for the remainder of the game.

Saint Xavier posted on 408 yards of total offense and 22 first downs while holding MidAmerica Nazarene to just 281 yards and 12 first downs. Saint Xavier scored 16 points in the final quarter towards the final score of 29–14.

==== #8 Azusa Pacific vs. #2 Carroll (MT) ====
	1	2	3	4	Total
#8 Azusa Pacific	14	0	0	0	14
#2 Carroll (MT)	7	3	0	7	17

Second-ranked Carroll pulled off the win in a close game against Azusa Pacific. After the first quarter of play, Azusa Pacific held the lead 14–7. Carroll managed a field goal in the second quarter to bring the score 14–10, but trailed until Chance Demarais made a 1-yard carry for a touchdown with only 01:51 left in the game.

Carroll won 17–14 and advanced to the semifinal round.

==== #9 Saint Francis (IN) vs. #3 Georgetown (KY) ====
	1	2	3	4	Total
#9 Saint Francis (IN)	0	0	7	7	14
#3 Georgetown (KY)	0	3	14	9	26

Saint Francis and head coach Kevin Donley returned to the Kentucky college where his coaching legacy began. In 1991, Donley led Georgetown to the NAIA Division II national championship. This time, Georgetown emerged with a victory over the visitors. Georgetown entered the 16-team postseason field as one of only two undefeated teams. Saint Francis ended the season, arguably one of the toughest in the 2012 NAIA season. Their 3 losses were to #1 (at the time the game was played) Saint Xavier, #2 Marian, and #3 Georgetown. All three opponents were undefeated at the time the Cougars faced them.

Georgetown posted on 351 yards of total offense and 17 first downs while holding Saint Francis to just 239 yards on 15 first downs. The game began as a defensive struggle, with a Georgetown field goal sending them to halftime with a 3–0 lead. Both offenses got going in the second half to produce the final score, 26–14.

=== Semifinals ===
==== #3 Georgetown (KY) vs. #2 Carroll (MT) ====
	1	2	3	4	Total
#3 Georgetown (KY)	0	3	0	0	3
#2 Carroll (MT)	7	7	14	7	35

With 7:16 on the clock in the first quarter, Carrol's Anthony Hogan caught a 20-yard pass from Dane Broadhead for the first score of the game. Tom Yaremko's extra point kick was good and Carroll led 7–0, and held the lead for the remainder of the game.

Carroll enjoyed a comfortable lead through the entire game, having put up 447 yards of total offense, 27 first downs, and five touchdown. Georgetown managed 241 total yards with 15 first downs, but no touchdowns and a lone field goal to score. Final score of the game: 35–3.

==== #5 Saint Xavier vs. #1 Marian ====
	1	2	3	4	Total
#5 Saint Xavier	0	10	13	7	30
#1 Marian	3	7	14	3	27

Fifth-ranked Saint Xavier upset and eliminated top-ranked Marian in the semifinal round of the NAIA National Championship game.

In many key statistical areas, Marian out-paced Saint Xavier: Total Yards (488–327); first downs (20–17); and yards per play (6.5–5.0). But Marian also gave up two interceptions for 28 yards and Saint Xavier managed to score 4 touchdowns and hold Marian to 3, leading Saint Xavier to a three-point victory: 30–27 and a berth in the national title game.

=== Championship Game ===
	1	2	3	4	Total
#5 Saint Xavier	10	7	7	0	24
#2 Carroll (MT)	0	14	6	0	20

The 2011 NAIA National Championship Game was played between #5 Saint Xavier and #2 Carroll.

==== First quarter ====
The game started off with a field goal and touchdown in the first quarter by underdog Saint Xavier. Tom Lynch kicked a good 20 yard field goal and later teammate Jimmy Coy pushed an 8-yard run to the end zone for a touchdown. Tom Lynch kicked the extra point and made the score 10–0 for Saint Xavier.

==== Second quarter ====
Carroll took possession after a punt and with 5:17 on the clock in the second quarter, Dane Broadhead completed a 20-yard pass to Matt Ritter for a touchdown, and Tom Yaremko's extra point kick was good to bring the score within three.

On the ensuing kickoff, Carroll's Anthony Clarke and Casey Norbeck teamed up to tackle Saint Xavier's Wes Gastel after a 43-yard return to Carroll's 49 yard line. Ten plays later, Saint Xavier's Jimmy Coy threw an 11-yard pass to Shane Zakery for a touchdown, and Lynch's second extra point of the game put the score to 17–7.

Five plays later, Carroll scored another touchdown, helped by Dane Broadhead's back-to-back 25+ yard passes, the second for a touchdown to Anthony Clarke with 39 seconds left in the half. Tom Yaremko's extra point kick was good and the score at the half ended Saint Xavier 17, Carroll 14.

==== Third quarter ====
The third quarter started great for Carroll when Jared Mayernik returned the kickoff 64 yards for a touchdown. The extra point attempt was no good, but Carroll held the lead 20–17 for the first time in the game.

In the next possession at 11:45 on the clock, KJ Franklin carried the football 4 yards for a touchdown to take back the lead for Saint Xavier. Tom Lynch's third successful extra point made the score 24–20 for the final score of the game.

==== Fourth quarter ====
Carroll had one last chance to win the game in the fourth quarter. On their final possession, Carroll had four plays from inside the nine yard line in an attempt to score a touchdown. Four dropped passes later, Saint Xavier took over on downs and ran out the clock for the win.

Both teams scored three touchdowns. Saint Xavier managed 355 yards of total offense with 23 first downs and held Carroll to 286 with 18 first downs. Neither team gave up a fumble or threw an interception.

== See also ==
- 2011 NAIA football rankings
