= Murder of Brandon Brown =

Brandon Larnell Brown
- Born: Brandon Doris Brown; June 13, 1986; Los Angeles, California, U.S.
- Died: September 22, 2012 (aged 26); Wichita, Kansas, U.S.
- Education: Tabor College; Cosumnes River College; Santa Ana College
- Occupations: College football player and student
- Known for: Tabor Bluejays athlete

Brandon Brown (June 13, 1986 – September 22, 2012) was a college football athlete for the Tabor College Bluejays in Hillsboro, Kansas. Brown was a defensive lineman from Sacramento, California and was found beaten and unresponsive on a street in nearby McPherson, Kansas early Sunday morning, September 16, 2012. He later died from his injuries at a Wichita hospital on September 22.

Brown transferred to Tabor from a community college in California as a redshirt Junior for the team.

== Aftermath ==
On October 4, 2012, the Kansas Collegiate Athletic Conference and presidents of McPherson and Tabor agreed to cancel their game scheduled for October 20, 2012. The game was cancelled in light of the ongoing investigation into the murder of Tabor football player Brandon Brown. Two former players from the nearby McPherson College Bulldogs football team have been charged with the murder: Alton Franklin and Dequinte Oshea Flournoy. Both were on the football roster at McPherson for the previous year, and Franklin was listed as a sophomore linebacker at the beginning of the 2012 season. He was dismissed from the team before the incident and Flournoy was also no longer a member of the team.

Michael Schneider, President of McPherson College said that McPherson and Tabor colleges do not have a rivalry that would account for what happened.

The murder garnered nationwide coverage, including ESPN, Sports Illustrated, The Huffington Post, USA Today, and Fox Sports. The Church of the Brethren also carried information to its church and schools nationwide. Both colleges were founded by the Church of the Brethren.

== Preliminary hearing ==
Investigation of the crime was handled in cooperation by the McPherson Police Department, the McPherson County Sheriff's Office, and the Kansas Bureau of Investigation.

After a preliminary hearing on January 31, 2013, the suspects Franklin and Flournoy were bound over for trial on charges of being accessories to second-degree murder.

The McPherson County Medical Examiner testified that Brown's blood alcohol level was .30, well above the legal limit in the state of Kansas. Attorneys for the defense argued that their actions were self-defense, saying "The defendants were using force to try to remove them from the premises." David Harger, Franklin's attorney continued, "Those people were armed. They then, as we know from police, stabbed the door with a knife."

Both Franklin and Flournoy entered a plea of not guilty.

== Trial ==
On Tuesday April 2, 2013 DeQuinte Flournoy, 20, entered a plea of no contest to a lesser charge of aggravated battery. This allowed him to avoid a trial and he is expected to testify against his co-defendant Alton Franklin at his trial in the following week. On June 4, 2013, he received a sentence of 2 years probation.

Alton Franklin faced trial on charges of murder and manslaughter. Two witnesses testified they saw Franklin hit Brown. While Flournoy testified that he did hit Brown for safety reasons he did not see anybody else hit Brown. The defense argued that there was no evidence that Franklin had struck anyone. The jury found Franklin not guilty and he was released from jail.

== See also ==
- 2012 Kansas Collegiate Athletic Conference football season
