= Mike Feminis =

American football player and coach

Current position
- Title: Head coach
- Team: Saint Xavier
- Conference: MSFA
- Record: 227–91

Playing career
- 1986–1989: St. Francis (IL)
- Position: Linebacker

Coaching career (HC unless noted)
- 1990–1993: St. Francis (IL) (LB)
- 1994–1998: St. Francis (IL) (DC)
- 1999–present: Saint Xavier

Head coaching record
- Overall: 227–91
- Tournaments: 19–15 (NAIA playoffs)

Accomplishments and honors

Championships
- 1 NAIA (2011); 12 MSFA Midwest (2002–2003, 2005, 2015, 2017–2019, 2021–2023, 2025); 3 MSFA Mideast (2009–2010, 2012)

Awards
- AFCA NAIA Coach of the Year (2011); NAIA Coach of the Year (2011)

Mike Feminis is an American college football coach and former player. He is the head football coach for Saint Xavier University in Chicago, a position he has held since 1999. Feminis led his 2011 Saint Xavier team to a NAIA Football National Championship.

== Head coaching record ==
| Year | Team | Overall | Conference | Standing | Bowl/playoffs | NAIA^{#} |
|---|---|---|---|---|---|---|
Saint Xavier Cougars (Mid-States Football Association) (1999–present)
| 1999 | Saint Xavier | 4–6 | 3–3 | 4th (MWL) | | |
| 2000 | Saint Xavier | 6–4 | 4–3 | 4th (MWL) | | |
| 2001 | Saint Xavier | 7–4 | 4–3 | T–3rd (MWL) | | 25 |
| 2002 | Saint Xavier | 9–3 | 6–1 | T–1st (MWL) | L NAIA First Round | 11 |
| 2003 | Saint Xavier | 7–4 | 5–2 | T–1st (MWL) | | 21 |
| 2004 | Saint Xavier | 7–4 | 5–2 | T–2nd (MWL) | | 22 |
| 2005 | Saint Xavier | 9–3 | 6–1 | T–1st (MWL) | L NAIA First Round | 9 |
| 2006 | Saint Xavier | 10–3 | 7–1 | 2nd (MWL) | L NAIA Semifinal | 4 |
| 2007 | Saint Xavier | 10–3 | 5–2 | 3rd (MEL) | L NAIA Quarterfinal | 8 |
| 2008 | Saint Xavier | 7–4 | 4–2 | T–2nd (MEL) | | 22 |
| 2009 | Saint Xavier | 13–1 | 7–0 | 1st (MEL) | L NAIA Semifinal | 4 |
| 2010 | Saint Xavier | 13–1 | 7–0 | 1st (MEL) | L NAIA Semifinal | 3 |
| 2011 | Saint Xavier | 14–1 | 4–1 | 2nd (MEL) | W NAIA Championship | 1 |
| 2012 | Saint Xavier | 11–2 | 4–1 | T–1st (MEL) | L NAIA Semifinal | 4 |
| 2013 | Saint Xavier | 7–4 | 4–2 | 3rd (MWL) | | 18 |
| 2014 | Saint Xavier | 10–3 | 4–1 | 2nd (MWL) | L NAIA Semifinal | 4 |
| 2015 | Saint Xavier | 7–4 | 4–1 | T–1st (MWL) | L NAIA First Round | 12 |
| 2016 | Saint Xavier | 5–6 | 3–2 | 2nd (MWL) | | |
| 2017 | Saint Xavier | 10–2 | 5–0 | 1st (MWL) | L NAIA Quarterfinal | 6 |
| 2018 | Saint Xavier | 9–4 | 5–0 | 1st (MWL) | L NAIA Quarterfinal | 7 |
| 2019 | Saint Xavier | 9–3 | 6–0 | 1st (MWL) | L NAIA Quarterfinal | 8 |
| 2020–21 | Saint Xavier | 5–3 | 3–3 | 4th (MWL) | | |
| 2021 | Saint Xavier | 8–3 | 6–1 | T–1st (MWL) | L NAIA First Round | |
| 2022 | Saint Xavier | 9–3 | 7–0 | 1st (MWL) | L NAIA First Round | |
| 2023 | Saint Xavier | 8–4 | 5–0 | 1st (MWL) | L NAIA Quarterfinal | T–10 |
| 2024 | Saint Xavier | 5–6 | 1–4 | 5th (MWL) | | |
| 2025 | Saint Xavier | 8–3 | 4–1 | T–1st (MWL) | | |
| 2026 | Saint Xavier | 0–0 | 0–0 | (MWL) | | |
| Saint Xavier: | | 227–91 | 128–37 | | | |
| Total: | | 227–91 | | | | |
National championship Conference title Conference division title or championship game berth

== See also ==
- List of college football career coaching wins leaders
