= Jamie Cruce =

American football player and coach

Current position
- Title: Head coach
- Team: Pratt HS (KS)

Playing career
- 1994: Hutchinson CC
- 1995–1997: Bethany (KS)
- Position: Linebacker

Coaching career (HC unless noted)
- 1998: Bethany (KS) (SA)
- 1999: Anderson (IN) (LB/S&C)
- 2000: Northern State (GA/LB)
- 2001–2006: Bethany (KS) (DC)
- 2007–2012: Bethany (KS)
- 2013–present: Pratt HS (KS)

Head coaching record
- Overall: 28–34 (college)

Jamie Cruce is an American football coach and former player. He served as the head football coach at Bethany College in Lindsborg, Kansas from 2007 to 2012. He was also a player at the school under hall of fame coach Ted Kessinger. He is now the high school head coach at Pratt, Kansas.

Cruce resigned from Bethany after the completion of the 2012 season. His record at Bethany was 28–34 overall and 21–33 in conference play. His best season was an 8–3 record in 2011, where the team finished third in the conference.

== Head coaching record ==
=== College ===
| Year | Team | Overall | Conference | Standing | Bowl/playoffs |
|---|---|---|---|---|---|
Bethany Terrible Swedes (Kansas Collegiate Athletic Conference) (2007–2012)
| 2007 | Bethany | 6–4 | 5–4 | 4th | |
| 2008 | Bethany | 3–8 | 2–7 | T–8th | |
| 2009 | Bethany | 5–6 | 3–6 | T–6th | |
| 2010 | Bethany | 4–6 | 3–6 | 7th | |
| 2011 | Bethany | 9–3 | 6–3 | 3rd | |
| 2012 | Bethany | 4–7 | 2–7 | 9th | |
| Bethany: | | 31–34 | 21–33 | | |
| Total: | | 31–34 | | | |
