= 2011 Saint Francis Cougars football team =

American college football season

2011 Saint Francis Cougars football

NAIA Playoff Quarterfinalist
- Conference: Mid-States Football Association
- Mideast League
- Record: 9–3 (3–2 MSFA (MEL))
- Head coach: Kevin Donley (14th season)
- Offensive coordinator: Patrick Donley, Trevor Miller (8th, 6th season)
- Defensive coordinator: Joey Didier, Eric Wagoner (2nd, 4th season)
- Home stadium: Bishop John M. D'Arcy Stadium

2011 Mid-States Football Association standings
	Conf.			Overall
Team	W		L	W		L
Mideast League
No. 3 Marian (IN) x^	5	–	0	12	–	1
No. 1 Saint Xavier ^	4	–	1	14	–	1
No. 7 Saint Francis (IN) ^	3	–	2	9	–	3
Taylor	2	–	3	5	–	5
Quincy	1	–	4	4	–	6
Concordia (MI)	0	–	5	0	–	11
Midwest League
No. 8 St. Francis (IL) x^	6	–	1	10	–	3
No. 18 Grand View x^	6	–	1	8	–	4
No. 15 William Penn	5	–	2	9	–	2
No. 22 St. Ambrose	5	–	2	7	–	3
Olivet Nazarene	3	–	4	5	–	6
Iowa Wesleyan	2	–	5	3	–	7
Trinity International	1	–	6	2	–	8
Waldorf	0	–	7	2	–	9
x – League champion/co-champions ^ – NAIA playoff participant; Rankings from NAIA Coaches' Poll

The 2011 Saint Francis Cougars football team represented the University of Saint Francis, located in Fort Wayne, Indiana, in the 2012 NAIA football season. They were led by head coach Kevin Donley, who served his 14th year as the first and only head coach in the history of Saint Francis football. The Cougars played their home games at Bishop John D'Arcy Stadium and were members of the Mid-States Football Association (MSFA) Mideast League (MEL). The Cougars finished in 3rd place in the MSFA MEL division, but they received an at-large bid to participate in the postseason NAIA playoffs.

== Schedule ==
(9–3 overall, 3–2 conference)

Date	Time	Opponent	Rank	Site	Result	Attendance
September 10	2:00pm	at St. Ambrose*	No. 4	Brady Street Stadium; Davenport, IA	W 34–33	1,200
September 17	Noon	McKendree*	No. 2	Bishop D'Arcy Stadium; Fort Wayne, IN	W 33–7	3,100
September 24	1:00pm	at Concordia (MI)	No. 2	River Bank Stadium; Ann Arbor, MI	W 69–0	498
October 1	Noon	No. 1 Saint Xavier	No. 2	Bishop D'Arcy Stadium; Fort Wayne, IN	L 31–42	4,000
October 8	Noon	at Walsh*	No. 7	Fawcett Stadium; Canton, OH	W 42–41 2OT	
October 15	Noon	No. 2 Marian^{†}	No. 6	Bishop D'Arcy Stadium; Fort Wayne, IN	L 13–40	3,300
October 22	Noon	Malone*	No. 12	Bishop D'Arcy Stadium; Fort Wayne, IN	W 47–10	2,500
October 29	2:00pm	at Quincy	No. 12	Flinn Stadium; Quincy, IL	W 34–7	328
November 5	1:00pm	at Taylor	No. 11	Jim Wheeler Memorial Stadium; Upland, IN	W 46–14	1,589
November 12	Noon	Central State*	No. 10	Bishop D'Arcy Stadium; Fort Wayne, IN	W 59–20	2,653
November 19	Noon	at No. 7 Missouri Valley*	No. 9	Volney Ashford Stadium; Marshall, MO (NAIA First Round)	W 28–14	1,819
November 26	1:30pm	at No. 3 Georgetown (KY)*	No. 9	Toyota Stadium; Georgetown, KY (NAIA Quarterfinal)	L 14–26	3,337
*Non-conference game; ^{†}Homecoming; Rankings from Coaches' Poll released prior to the game; All times are in Eastern time

== Game summaries ==
The 2011 season opened with the Cougars ranked #4 in the coaches preseason poll.

9/10/2011 - After a hard-fought 1-point victory over St. Ambrose, the Cougars gained two spots in the NAIA national rankings. After their first game, the Cougars trailed only conference rival Saint Xavier in the polls.

9/24/2011 - The game was over early as Saint Francis ran back the opening kickoff for a touchdown. With 30 seconds gone off the clock, the score reached 14–0 after Saint Francis capitalized on a Concordia turnover. The score was 41–0 after one period of play. This was the first season for football at Concordia, so the lop-sided outcome was not a surprise. The win sets up an anticipated game next week as undefeated and NAIA #1 Saint Xavier visits undefeated and NAIA #2 USF.

10/1/2011 - The NAIA's #1 ranked Saint Xavier visited the #2 ranked Saint Francis in a battle for the conference and national lead. The anticipated matchup between the two teams, both nicknamed the Cougars, never materialized. Saint Francis took the opening kickoff and turned it into a field goal for a quick three-point lead. But from that point to the end, Saint Xavier controlled both sides of the ball and won more convincingly than the final score indicated.

Saint Xavier's offense ended with 452 yards while Saint Francis totaled 360 yards. The Saint Francis effort included 27 rushes for 72 yards, or 2.7 yards per attempt. Passing tallied another 268 yards on 19-46 and 4 interceptions. Additionally, the offense fumbled the ball 6 times and lost 2 to Saint Xavier. The surprisingly uncharacteristic total of 10 turnovers and 6 fumbles for the USF Cougars was the same disappointing play that has resulted in 4 straight losses to SXU.

One bright spot was the play of the special teams. Early in the first quarter, a Saint Francis punt bounced off the Saint Xavier punt returner and was recovered in the end zone for a Saint Francis touchdown, pushing the lead to a hopeful 10–0 margin.

Saint Francis still lead 17–16 at halftime when Saint Xavier lined up for the third quarter kickoff. Instead of kicking the ball deep, SXU successfully executed an onside kick, and their offense soon capitalized on the play. A touchdown gave Saint Xavier their first lead of the game, 23–17. However, the Saint Francis return team took the ensuing kickoff 98 yards to quickly regain the lead, 24–23. That was the last highlight for Saint Francis except for an inconsequential touchdown late in the game after the outcome was already determined. The loss dropped USF to 7th in the national polls. Saint Xavier retained the #1 position and was closely followed by MSFA conference foe Marian, who took over the #2 spot held the prior week by Saint Francis. The latter two teams will meet in two weeks in Fort Wayne, and Saint Francis hopes to get another shot at Saint Xavier in the postseason tournament.

10/8/2011 - After last week's loss, USF had another difficult opponent in Walsh. Formerly a MSFA conference meeting, the game was a non-league contest this year due to the transition of Walsh from the NAIA to NCAA-II football. The game was won in the 2nd overtime period when USF scored and converted the extra point kick after a missed extra point effort by Walsh. The game was highlighted by USF redshirt freshman Antoin Campbell, who set a new Cougar record by scoring 5 touchdowns in the game. For the week's effort, the Cougars moved up one spot in the national rankings to 6th. The tough opponents continue next week with another conference game, Homecoming Week against Marian, the nation's #2 ranked team.

10/15/2011 - Facing their second top-2 ranked team in 3 weeks, the outcome this week was known from the start. Marian drove the opening kickoff to a touchdown and a 7–0 lead, and they were up 14–0 before Saint Francis put any points on the board. Marian dominated the game, led by the nation's top-ranked scoring and passing defense, and USF never raised a serious threat. The outcome was another home defeat for USF, by a final score of 40–13. The 27-point deficit was the largest differential for a home game in the history of Saint Francis football. The 2-game home losing streak matched a feat not seen since the inaugural 1998 football season. With the loss, the Cougars dropped to 12th in the national rankings. Marian stayed undefeated and set up a likely showdown in the final game of the regular season, a home contest against Saint Xavier. The game could feature two undefeated teams, ranked #1 and #2 in the NAIA national polls, vying for the top seed in the playoffs, an undefeated regular season, and the MSFA Mideast division championship.

10/22/2011 - The Cougars returned to their winning ways with a 47–10 victory over visiting Malone. This might be the last game ever against the Cougars' former conference rival. Malone has begun a transition to leave the NAIA to join the NCAA Division II football level. Therefore, today's game was not a conference win for USF.

10/29/2011 - The Cougars posted a 34–7 road win over conference opponent Quincy University. After the win, USF rose one spot in the national polls to 11th among all NAIA football programs.

11/5/2011 - Turnovers plagued the Cougars offense this week just as they have all season. A pick-6 interception resulted in one Taylor touchdown, and a muffed field goal attempt was returned for a second touchdown, and the Cougars found themselves tied with Taylor at the half, 14–14. But the Cougars settled down in the second half, scoring 32 unanswered points for a 46–14 victory. The defensive play was solid for the Cougars, completing a TSO (technical shut-out) for the day. With two losses and one game left in the regular season, the Cougars likely need to win their final game to enter the 16-team, post-season NAIA football playoffs.

11/12/2011 - The Cougars finished the regular season with an impressive 59–20 home win over NCAA Division II opponent Central State. The victory completed a season whose two losses ironically came to conference foes who were ranked #1 and #2 in the nation at the time the games were played. The USF season was extended with an invitation to the NAIA playoffs, playing the following week as the 9th seed in the 16-team tournament.

11/19/2011 - The Cougars opened the 2011 NAIA playoffs with a 28–14 road win at Missouri Valley. The win was the 9th straight first round postseason win for the Cougars.

11/26/2011 - The USF season ended with their 3rd loss of the year to an undefeated, top-3 ranked team. Each of the 3 teams advanced to the NAIA Championship semifinal round. This time, the Cougars traveled to undefeated and #3 Georgetown College (KY), and they were handed a 26–14 loss. Turnovers and untimely penalties once again contributed significantly to the loss.

With their performance against the tough 2011 schedule, including a first round postseason win, the Cougars were elevated to 7th place in the final Coaches poll of the season.

== Ranking movements ==
Ranking movements Legend: ██ Increase in ranking ██ Decrease in ranking
	Week											
Poll	Pre	1	2	3	4	5	6	7	8	9	10	Final
NAIA Coaches' Poll	4	2	2	2	7	6	12	12	11	10	9	7
