= Mike Craven (American football) =

American football coach

Coaching career (HC unless noted)
- 1993–1998: Saint Xavier

Head coaching record
- Overall: 8–51

Michael Craven is an American former football coach. He was the head football coach at Saint Xavier University in Chicago, Illinois for six seasons, from 1993 until 1998, compiling a record of 8–51.
