= 2011 NAIA football rankings =

Legend
	Increase in ranking
	Decrease in ranking
	Not ranked previous week
*	NAIA National Champion
т	Tied with team above or below also with this symbol

One human poll made up the 2011 NAIA football rankings, sometimes called the NAIA Coaches' Poll or the football ratings. Once the regular season was complete, the NAIA sponsored a 16-team playoff to determine the year's national champion. A final poll was then taken after completion of the 2011 NAIA Football National Championship.

== Poll release dates ==
The poll release dates were:

- April 18, 2011 (Spring)
- August 8, 2011 (Preseason)
- September 12, 2011
- September 19, 2011
- September 26, 2011
- October 3, 2011
- October 10, 2011
- October 17, 2011
- October 24, 2011
- October 31, 2011
- November 7, 2011
- November 13, 2011 (Final)
- December 19, 2011 (Postseason)

== Week by week poll ==
	Week 0-Spring Apr 18	Week 0-Preseason Aug 08	Week Poll 1 Sep 12	Week Poll 2 Sep 19	Week Poll 3 Sep 26	Week Poll 4 Oct 03	Week Poll 5 Oct 10	Week Poll 6 Oct 17	Week Poll 7 Oct 24	Week Poll 8 Oct 31	Week Poll 9 Nov 07	Week Final Nov 13	Week Postseason Dec 19	
1.	Carroll (MT) (15)	Carroll (MT) (14)	Saint Xavier (IL) (15)	Saint Xavier (IL) (15)	Saint Xavier (IL) (15)	Saint Xavier (IL) (15)	Saint Xavier (IL) (15)	Saint Xavier (IL) (14)	Saint Xavier (IL) (14)	Saint Xavier (IL) (14)	Marian (IN) (14)	Marian (IN) (13)	*Saint Xavier (IL) (15)	1.
2.	Saint Xavier (IL)	Saint Xavier (IL)	Saint Francis (IN)	Saint Francis (IN)	Saint Francis (IN)	Marian (IN)	Marian (IN)	Marian (IN) (1)	Marian (IN) (1)	Marian (IN) (1)	Carroll (MT) (1)	Carroll (MT) (2)	Carroll (MT)	2.
3.	MidAmerica Nazarene (KS)	MidAmerica Nazarene (KS)	Morningside (IA)	Marian (IN)	Marian (IN)	Carroll (MT)	Carroll (MT)	Carroll (MT)	Carroll (MT)	Carroll (MT)	Georgetown (KY)	Georgetown (KY)	Marian (IN)	3.
4.	Saint Francis (IN)	Saint Francis (IN)	Marian (IN)	Carroll (MT)	Carroll (MT)	William Penn (IA)	Missouri Valley	Georgetown (KY)	Georgetown (KY)	Georgetown (KY)	MidAmerica Nazarene (KS)	MidAmerica Nazarene (KS)	Georgetown (KY)	4.
5.	Morningside (IA)	Morningside (IA)	Carroll (MT)	William Penn (IA)	William Penn (IA)	Missouri Valley	Georgetown (KY)	MidAmerica Nazarene (KS)	MidAmerica Nazarene (KS)	MidAmerica Nazarene (KS)	Saint Xavier (IL)	Saint Xavier (IL)	Azusa Pacific (CA)	5.
6.	Marian (IN)	Marian (IN)	William Penn (IA)	Missouri Valley	Missouri Valley	Georgetown (KY)	Saint Francis (IN)	Morningside (IA)	Morningside (IA)	Morningside (IA)	Morningside (IA)	Morningside (IA)	MidAmerica Nazarene (KS)	6.
7.	Dickinson State (ND)	Dickinson State (ND)	Missouri Valley	Georgetown (KY)	Georgetown (KY)	Saint Francis (IN)	MidAmerica Nazarene (KS)	Benedictine (KS)	Missouri Valley	Missouri Valley	Missouri Valley	Missouri Valley	Saint Francis (IN)	7.
8.	William Penn (IA)	William Penn (IA)	Georgetown (KY)	MidAmerica Nazarene (KS)	MidAmerica Nazarene (KS)	MidAmerica Nazarene (KS)	Morningside (IA)	Azusa Pacific (CA)	William Penn (IA)	William Penn (IA)	William Penn (IA)	Azusa Pacific (CA)	St. Francis (IL)	8.
9.	McPherson (KS)	Georgetown (KY)	MidAmerica Nazarene (KS)	(T) Midland (NE)	Eastern Oregon	Morningside (IA)	Benedictine (KS)	(T) Missouri Valley	St. Francis (IL)	Benedictine (KS)	Azusa Pacific (CA)	Saint Francis (IN)	Morningside (IA)	9.
10.	Ottawa (KS)	Ottawa (KS)	Cumberlands (KY)	(T) Eastern Oregon	Morningside (IA)	Southern Nazarene (OK)	Azusa Pacific (CA)	(T) William Penn (IA)	Benedictine (KS)	Azusa Pacific (CA)	Saint Francis (IN)	Ottawa (KS)	Missouri Valley	10.
11.	Missouri Valley	Missouri Valley	Midland (NE)	Morningside (IA)	Southern Nazarene (OK)	Benedictine (KS)	William Penn (IA)	St. Francis (IL)	Azusa Pacific (CA)	Saint Francis (IN)	Ottawa (KS)	St. Francis (IL)	Ottawa (KS)	11.
12.	Georgetown (KY)	McPherson (KS)	Eastern Oregon	Southern Nazarene (OK)	Benedictine (KS)	Azusa Pacific (CA)	St. Francis (IL)	Saint Francis (IN)	Saint Francis (IN)	St. Ambrose (IA)	Valley City State (ND)	Valley City State (ND)	Southern Nazarene (OK)	12.
13.	Northwestern Oklahoma State	Northwestern Oklahoma State	Southern Nazarene (OK)	Benedictine (KS)	Azusa Pacific (CA)	Doane (NE)	Dakota Wesleyan (SD)	St. Ambrose (IA)	St. Ambrose (IA)	Ottawa (KS)	St. Francis (IL)	Bethel (TN)	Benedictine (KS)	13.
14.	Northwestern (IA)	Northwestern (IA)	Benedictine (KS)	Azusa Pacific (CA)	Midland (NE)	Bethany (KS)	St. Ambrose (IA)	Bethel (TN)	Ottawa (KS)	Cumberland (TN)	Bethel (TN)	Southern Nazarene (OK)	Bethel (TN)	14.
15.	Azusa Pacific (CA)	Azusa Pacific (CA)	Azusa Pacific (CA)	Cumberlands (KY)	Bethany (KS)	St. Francis (IL)	Southern Nazarene (OK)	Ottawa (KS)	Cumberland (TN)	Valley City State (ND)	Southern Nazarene (OK)	Benedictine (KS)	William Penn (IA)	15.
16.	Cumberlands (KY)	Cumberlands (KY)	Northwestern (IA)	Bethany (KS)	St. Francis (IL)	Dakota Wesleyan (SD)	Ottawa (KS)	Valley City State (ND)	Valley City State (ND)	St. Francis (IL)	Benedictine (KS)	William Penn (IA)	Valley City State (ND)	16.
17.	Midland (NE)	Midland (NE)	Campbellsville (KY)	Rocky Mountain (MT)	Doane (NE)	Eastern Oregon	Bethel (TN)	Cumberland (TN)	Doane (NE)	Bethel (TN)	St. Ambrose (IA)	Northwestern (IA)	Northwestern (IA)	17.
18.	Southern Nazarene (OK)	Cumberland (TN)	Langston (OK)	Shorter (GA)	Dakota Wesleyan (SD)	St. Ambrose (IA)	Valley City State (ND)	Doane (NE)	Bethany (KS)	Southern Nazarene (OK)	Northwestern (IA)	Grand View (IA)	Grand View (IA)	18.
19.	Cumberland (TN)	Southern Nazarene (OK)	Bethany (KS)	St. Francis (IL)	Campbellsville (KY)	Ottawa (KS)	Doane (NE)	Dakota Wesleyan (SD)	Bethel (TN)	Langston (OK)	Langston (OK)	Eastern Oregon	Doane (NE)	19.
20.	Kansas Wesleyan	Webber International (FL)	Rocky Mountain (MT)	Dakota Wesleyan (SD)	St. Ambrose (IA)	Valley City State (ND)	Cumberland (TN)	Bethany (KS)	Southern Nazarene (OK)	Northwestern (IA)	Cumberland (TN)	Doane (NE)	Eastern Oregon	20.
21.	South Dakota Mines & Technology	Kansas Wesleyan	(T) Shorter (GA)	Doane (NE)	Ottawa (KS)	Bethel (TN)	Rocky Mountain (MT)	Southern Nazarene (OK)	Langston (OK)	Eastern Oregon	Eastern Oregon	Baker (KS)	Baker (KS)	21.
22.	Webber International (FL)	Benedictine (KS)	(T) Dakota Wesleyan (SD)	Baker (KS)	Montana State-Northern	Shorter (GA)	Bethany (KS)	Eastern Oregon	Northwestern (IA)	Doane (NE)	Doane (NE)	St. Ambrose (IA)	St. Ambrose (IA)	22.
23.	(T) Baker (KS)	Baker (KS)	Montana State-Northern	Ottawa (KS)	Valley City State (ND)	Rocky Mountain (MT)	(T) Eastern Oregon	Northwestern (IA)	Dakota Wesleyan (SD)	Grand View (IA)	Grand View (IA)	Langston (OK)	Langston (OK)	23.
24.	(T) Benedictine (KS)	St. Francis (IL)	(T) Ottawa (KS)	Campbellsville (KY)	Menlo (CA)	Midland (NE)	(T) Northwestern Oklahoma State	Langston (OK)	Rocky Mountain (MT)	Bethany (KS)	Baker (KS)	Cumberlands (KY)	Cumberlands (KY)	24.
25.	St. Francis (IL)	Grand View (IA)	(T) St. Francis (IL)	St. Ambrose (IA)	Evangel (MO)	Cumberland (TN)	Menlo (CA)	Shorter (GA)	Eastern Oregon	Baker (KS)	Bethany (KS)	Cumberland (TN)	Cumberland (TN)	25.
	Week 0-Spring Apr 18	Week 0-Preseason Aug 08	Week Poll 1 Sep 12	Week Poll 2 Sep 19	Week Poll 3 Sep 26	Week Poll 4 Oct 03	Week Poll 5 Oct 10	Week Poll 6 Oct 17	Week Poll 7 Oct 24	Week Poll 8 Oct 31	Week Poll 9 Nov 07	Week Final Nov 13	Week Postseason Dec 19	
		Dropped: South Dakota Mines & Technology	Dropped: Dickinson State (ND); McPherson (KS); Northwestern Oklahoma State; Cumberland (TN); Kansas Wesleyan; Benedictine (KS); Baker (KS); Grand View (IA)	Dropped: Northwestern (IA); Langston (OK); Montana State-Northern; St. Francis (IL)	Dropped: Cumberlands (KY); Rocky Mountain (MT); Shorter (GA); Baker (KS)	Dropped: Campbellsville (KY); Montana State-Northern; Menlo (CA); Evangel (MO)	Dropped: Shorter (GA); Midland (NE)	Dropped: Rocky Mountain (MT); Eastern Oregon; Northwestern Oklahoma State; Menlo (CA)	Dropped: Shorter (GA)	Dropped: Dakota Wesleyan (SD); Rocky Mountain (MT)	None	Dropped: Bethany (KS)	None	

== Leading Vote-Getters ==
Since the inception of the Coaches' Poll in 1999, the #1 ranking in the various weekly polls has been held by only a select group of teams. Through the end of 2011, the team and the number of times they have held the #1 weekly ranking are shown below. The number of times a team has been ranked #1 in the postseason poll (the national champion) is shown in parentheses.

In 1999, the results of a postseason poll, if one was conducted, are not known. Therefore, an additional poll was presumed, and the #1 postseason ranking has been credited to the postseason tournament champion, the Northwestern Oklahoma State Rangers.

Team	Total #1 Rankings
Carroll (MT)	56 (6)
Sioux Falls (SD)	55 (3)
Georgetown (KY)	23 (2)
Northwestern Oklahoma State	12 (1)
Saint Xavier (IL)	9 (1)
Azusa Pacific (CA)	3
Saint Francis (IN)	3
Marian (IN)	2
