= NAIA Coaches' Poll =

The NAIA Coaches' Poll typically refers to a weekly ranking of the top 25 National Association of Intercollegiate Athletics (NAIA) college football and college basketball teams, though other NAIA polls exist as well. The poll is voted upon by a panel of head coaches representing each of the conferences and independents.
