= Hillsboro High School (Kansas) =

Location
- 500 East Grand Avenue; Hillsboro, Kansas 67063; United States
- Coordinates: 38.352832°N 97.199216°W

Information
- School type: Public, High School
- School board: Board Website
- School district: Hillsboro USD 410
- CEEB code: 171350
- Principal: Tyler Weinbrenner
- Grades: 9 to 12
- Gender: coed
- Campus type: rural
- Colors: Maroon; Gold
- Athletics: Class 3A, District 12
- Athletics conference: Central Kansas League
- Mascot: Trojan
- Rival: Marion High School
- Communities served: Hillsboro, Lehigh, Durham
- Website: School website

Hillsboro High School is a public secondary school in Hillsboro, Kansas, United States. It is one of three schools operated by Hillsboro USD 410 school district, and is the sole public high school for the communities of Hillsboro, Lehigh, Durham, and nearby rural areas of Marion County.

== History ==
In 1961, Reimer Stadium was built on the south side of Tabor College campus and named after former athletic director Del Reimer. In 2008, the old stadium was demolished then replaced by Joel Wiens Stadium in 2009, which was a joint venture between Tabor College and Hillsboro USD 410. The new 3,000-seat stadium includes new artificial football and soccer turf, synthetic track and a throwing area for field events, new bleachers on the home side, a new press box, and new concession stand and restroom facilities. The team locker rooms and athletic offices were also constructed at the north end of the stadium at college expense.

== Academics ==
The high school is a member of T.E.E.N., a shared video teaching network, started in 1993, between five area high schools.

== Varsity sports ==
=== Fall ===
Boys
Cross Country
Football

Girls
Cross Country
Volleyball
Tennis
Cheerleading

=== Winter ===
Boys

Basketball
Wrestling

Girls

Basketball
Cheerleading

=== Spring ===
Boys

Baseball
Tennis
Golf
Track & Field

Girls

Softball
Track & Field

== Notable people ==
- Theodore Schellenberg (1903–1970), archivist and archival theorist

== See also ==
- Joel Wiens Stadium
- List of high schools in Kansas
- List of unified school districts in Kansas
