= Brookens =

Brookens is a surname. Notable people with the surname include:

- Ike Brookens (born 1949), American baseball player
- J. Robert Brookens (born 1950), American politician
- Tom Brookens (born 1953), American baseball player and coach

== See also ==
- Brookins
