= Reimer Stadium =

Stadium in Kansas, United States

- Interactive map of Reimer Stadium
- Location: Hillsboro, Kansas
- Coordinates: 38°20′42″N 97°11′55″W
- Owner: Tabor College
- Operator: Tabor College
- Capacity: 2,500
- Surface: grass

Construction
- Opened: 1961
- Closed: 2008
- Demolished: 2008

Tenant
- Tabor Bluejays

Reimer Stadium was a sport stadium in Hillsboro, Kansas, United States. The facility is primarily used by the Tabor College football and track & field teams. The stadium was also used for Hillsboro USD 410 sporting events and other community events. The stadium was named for former athletic director Del Reimer.

In 2008, Reimer Stadium was torn down and replaced by Joel Wiens stadium in 2009.
