= Valley Children's Stadium =

Outdoor football stadium in Fresno, California, USA

Valley Children’s Stadium
- The Doghouse
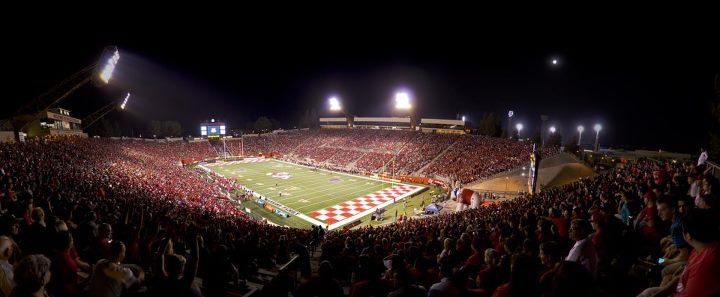
- View from northeast in October 2012

- Location in the United States Location in California
- Interactive map of Valley Children’s Stadium
- Former names: Bulldog Stadium (1980–2021)
- Address: 1620 E Bulldog Lane
- Location: Fresno, California, U.S.
- Coordinates: 36.814°N 119.758°W
- Owner: California State University, Fresno
- Operator: California State University, Fresno
- Capacity: 30,000 (1981–1990); 40,541 (1991–1992); 41,031 (1993–2017); 40,727 (since 2018)
- Executive suites: 22
- Surface: Natural grass (1980–2010); FieldTurf (2011–2018); AstroTurf (since 2019)
- Record attendance: 43,086 (vs Boise State 2026)

Construction
- Groundbreaking: June 1979; 47 years ago
- Opened: November 25, 1980; 45 years ago
- Expanded: 1991
- Cost: $7.198 million ($35.5 million in 2025 dollars)
- Architects: Stevens and Associates
- General contractor: Robert F. Fisher Company

Tenants
- Fresno State Bulldogs (NCAA) (since 1980); California Bowl (NCAA) (1981–1991)

Valley Children's Stadium, also known as Jim Sweeney Field at Bulldog Stadium, is an outdoor college football stadium located on the campus of California State University, Fresno, in Fresno, California. It is the home field of the Fresno State Bulldogs, who play in the Pac-12 Conference.

== History ==
=== Funding and construction ===
Prior to the construction of Bulldog Stadium, Fresno State played at 13,000-seat Ratcliffe Stadium at Fresno City College, about five miles (8 km) southwest of campus. In the early 1970s, there were only two stadiums in the Fresno area, Ratcliffe and McLane, which made scheduling of local football games difficult. Those two stadiums had to host all local high school, community college and university games, which forced some high school games to be played on Thursday nights, rather than the traditional Friday nights.

The 1974 addition of Lamonica Stadium in Clovis eased the bottleneck somewhat, but efforts to build a stadium at Fresno State became serious in the mid-1970s. Bob Goss, chairman of the athletics booster organization the Bulldog Foundation, said in 1973: "I feel strongly the community of Fresno not only needs a new stadium, but can afford it, and is willing to get going as soon as possible on a drive to raise a part of the money."

In 1975, Fresno State students voted not to contribute to the stadium project via tuition fees, but the state budget included $1.2 million for it. A stadium steering committee was established in 1977, led by local businessman Leon Peters, looking to make the project a reality.

An initial round of construction bids came in over budget and the steering committee reworked their request. A second round of bidding offered better results and the local Robert G. Fisher Company was awarded the construction contract. Bulldog Stadium was completed in September 1980, a few months ahead of schedule, and had a seating capacity of 30,000.

It hosted the California Bowl from 1981 to 1991 and friendly soccer matches prior to the 1994 FIFA World Cup.

=== Renovations ===
The completion of the stadium correlated with a drastic rise in the fortunes of the Fresno State football program, led by head coach Jim Sweeney, including multiple conference championships and finishing the 1985 season ranked 16th in the coaches' poll. But the program still had problems scheduling high-profile opponents, and a stadium expansion was proposed as a way to mitigate those issues, as well as boost recruiting efforts and revenue. The expansion, consisting of 22 "sky suites" added to the east side, as well as 2,000 more chair seats and 7,200 bench seats, was approved in 1989 and completed in 1991, increasing capacity from 30,000 to around 40,000.

=== Impact ===
Bulldog Stadium is one of the premier home football environments, among universities outside of the so-called "power conferences". Tailgate parties in the adjoining parking lots and athletic fields are a popular pastime for Bulldog supporters and the fans are notable for their enthusiastic support within the stadium's environment. For several decades, supporters of Fresno State football have been nicknamed "The Red Wave" as a tribute to their swell of support and their tendency to be clad entirely in red clothing for home contests.

For most of Fresno State's history, Bulldog Stadium was at its loudest when Fresno State played their arch-rival, the San Jose State Spartans. Since the Boise State Broncos succeeded in multiple conferences, Fresno State's contested games for fans have been pitted against them. Their success in the Western Athletic Conference, and then in the Mountain West Conference when both teams joined, has contributed to a modern rivalry.

== Facility ==
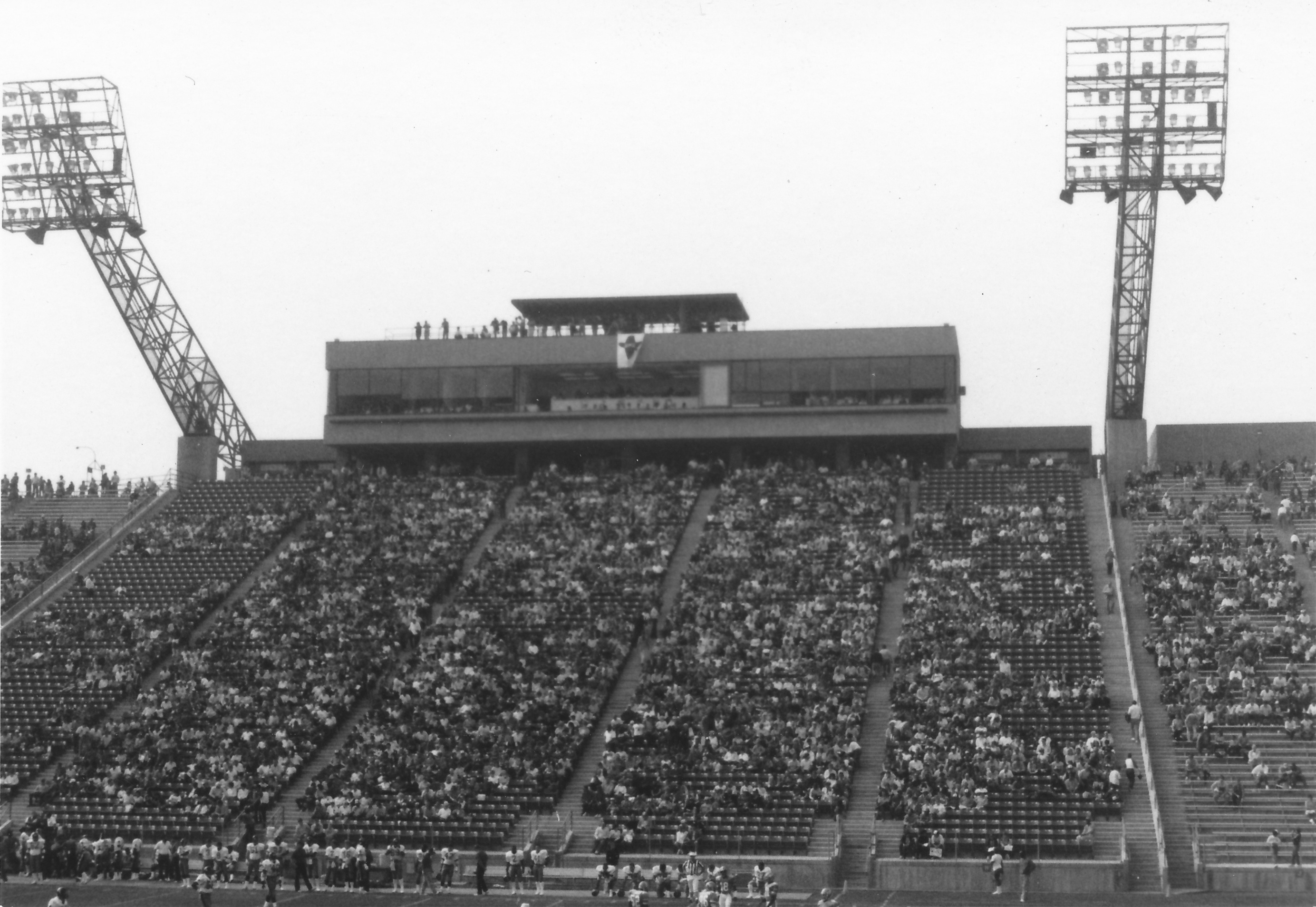
The grandstands and cantilevered lights at Bulldog Stadium in 1985

Bulldog Stadium is constructed in a modern version of the sunken "bowl" style, with seats located unusually close to the game action and at a steeper slope compared to bowled stadia of the early 20th century. Field lighting is mounted on four unique, recognizable cantilevered standards.

The field has a conventional north-south alignment and the street level elevation is approximately 330 feet (100 m) above sea level. Currently Bulldog Stadium ranks 110th on the List of American football stadiums by capacity..

=== Field markings ===
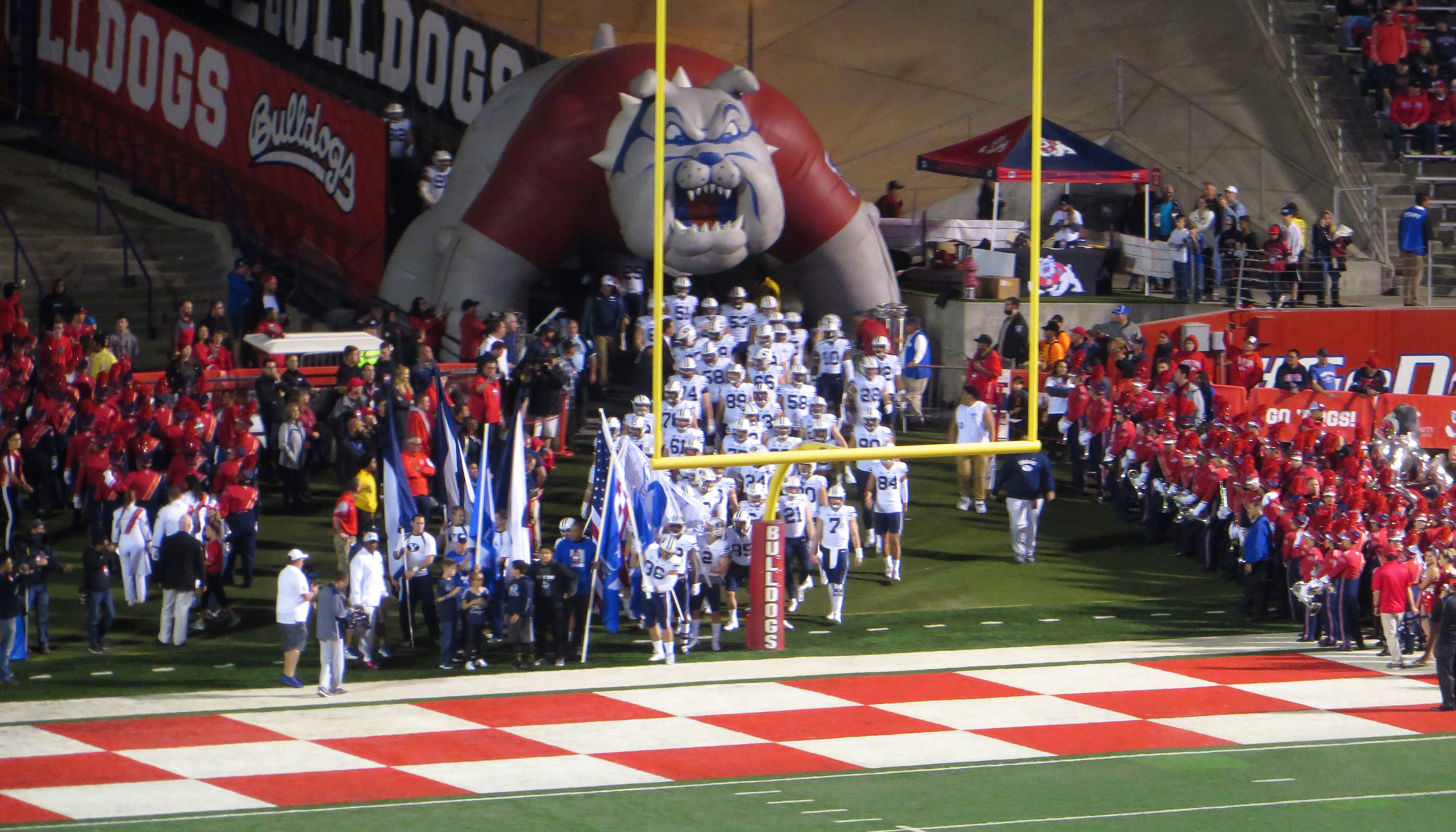
Fresno State vs. BYU in 2017 with endzone checkerboard pattern in view

For Fresno State football games, both end zones are designed in a red-and-white checkerboard pattern, similar to the University of Tennessee's orange-and-white at Neyland Stadium. In 2019, athletic director Terry Tumey said; "I think many folks see that checkerboard and it resonates Fresno State." Fresno State's Bulldog mascot is depicted at midfield in an enlarged style. A green and red "V" appears at the 25-yard line as a tribute to the agricultural community of the San Joaquin Valley. The "V" matches the design worn on the back of the players helmets.

The field was notable for having numerical markers every five yards (similar to the field at Louisiana State's Tiger Stadium) rather than every ten yards, as is typical. The field went back to the conventional ten-yard markings in 2009.

=== Playing surface ===
For its first 31 seasons, the playing field was natural grass. FieldTurf was installed in the summer of 2011, when concerns arose after winter rains saturated the field during the 2010 season, making for very slick field conditions. The $1.2 million project was funded entirely through private donations. The FieldTurf was replaced by AstroTurf in 2019 when it reached the end of its life span.

=== Naming ===
The field was named for longtime head coach Jim Sweeney (1929–2013) in a 1997 ceremony.

In 2021, local children's hospital Valley Children's Healthcare agreed to provide the Fresno State athletics department with $1 million annually over 10 years for the naming rights of Bulldog Stadium. The consulting agency formed by alumni brothers Derek and David Carr played a pivotal role in the negotiations of the deal. Referring to the deal, Derek Carr said both organizations are "leaders in the Valley" and that "this partnership just made so much sense to us." The stadium renaming became official in July 2022 via a vote by the CSU Board of Trustees. The decision triggered a backlash on social media, with some area residents saying Valley Children's was "squandering funds" and others lamenting the addition of more advertising to the in-person stadium experience.

== See also ==
- List of NCAA Division I FBS football stadiums
