= Hillsboro USD 410 =

Public school district in Hillsboro, Kansas

Address
- 416 S. Date St. Hillsboro, Kansas, 67063; United States
- Coordinates: 38°20′54″N 97°12′36″W

District information
- Type: Public
- Grades: K to 12
- Superintendent: Clint Corby
- Schools: 3

Other information
- Website: usd410.net

Hillsboro USD 410, also known as Durham-Hillsboro-Lehigh USD 410, is a public unified school district headquartered in Hillsboro, Kansas, United States. The district includes the communities of Hillsboro, Lehigh, Durham, and nearby rural areas of Marion County.

== History ==
The number of students in rural communities dropped significantly across the 20th century. As farming technology progressed from animal power to small tractors towards large tractors over time, it allowed a farmer to support significantly more farm land. In turn, this led to fewer farm families, which led to fewer rural students. In combination with a loss of young men during foreign wars and rural flight, all of these caused an incremental population shrinkage of rural communities over time.

In 1945 (after World War II), the School Reorganization Act in Kansas caused the consolidation of thousands of rural school districts in Kansas.

In 1963, the School Unification Act in Kansas caused the further consolidatation of thousands of tiny school districts into hundreds of larger Unified School Districts.

In 1961, Reimer Stadium was built on the south side of Tabor College campus and named after former athletic director Del Reimer. In 2008, the old stadium was demolished then replaced by Joel Wiens Stadium in 2009, which was a joint venture between Tabor College and Hillsboro USD 410. The new 3,000-seat stadium includes new artificial football and soccer turf, synthetic track and a throwing area for field events, new bleachers on the home side, a new press box, and new concession stand and restroom facilities. The team locker rooms and athletic offices were also constructed at the north end of the stadium at college expense.

On January 23, 2024, a public vote passed for a bond to improve existing schools: add new dual-use tornado shelter & classroom at HES, replace plumbing at HES, update gym at HES, renovate PreK-2 playground at HES, add secured entrances to HES & HMHS, replace air conditioning for HMHS gyms, update auditorium, update fire alarm system in HMHS, add new greenhouse, replace all roofs, fix various sidewalks, replace windows on HMS and various exterior reworks.

=== Current schools ===
The school district operates the following schools:

- Hillsboro High School at 500 East Grand Ave in Hillsboro.
- Hillsboro Middle School at 400 East Grand Ave in Hillsboro.
- Hillsboro Elementary School at 812 East A Street in Hillsboro.

=== Closed schools ===
- Lehigh High School in Lehigh. It was closed.
- Durham High School in Durham. It was closed.

== See also ==
- Kansas State Department of Education
- Kansas State High School Activities Association
- List of high schools in Kansas
- List of unified school districts in Kansas
