= List of killings by law enforcement officers in the United States, August 2010 =

)

This is a list of people reported killed by non-military law enforcement officers in the United States in August 2010, whether in the line of duty or not, and regardless of reason or method. The listing documents the occurrence of a death, making no implications regarding wrongdoing or justification on the part of the person killed or officer involved. Killings are arranged by date of the incident that caused death. Different death dates, if known, are noted in the description. The table below lists 28 people.

== August 2010 ==
| Date | Name (Age) of Deceased | State (city) | Description |
|---|---|---|---|
| 2010-08-31 | Efren Valdemoro (38) | California (Vallejo) | |
| 2010-08-31 | Edward C. Zevola Sr. (61) | Pennsylvania (Baldwin Borough) | When Officer Kim Reising arrived, Zevola was sitting in a chair on the front patio with a rifle ... He said, 'I'm a Vietnam veteran. I have seven rounds. I won't shoot for your Kevlar (bulletproof vest). I'll shoot for your head,' " ... Reising tried to calm Zevola and to get him to drop the weapon. Another officer approaching through nearby woods saw him raise his rifle and point it toward Reising. The officer fired a single shot that struck Zevola. |
| 2010-08-31 | David Charles Young (23) | Washington state (Federal Way) | Shot while advancing a pickup truck towards officer "in an aggressive manner" after vehicle crashed following a chase. Police had pursued Young on suspicion of driving a stolen vehicle. |
| 2010-08-30 | Thomas Richard Cowan (62) | Tennessee (Blountville) | |
| 2010-08-30 | John T. Williams (50) | Washington (Seattle) | The victim was John T. Williams, a 50-year-old of Native American ancestry who was known for his wood-carving. Officer Ian Birk saw Williams carrying a piece of wood and a three-inch blade. He ordered Williams to drop the knife. Williams was slow to respond. And from a distance of nine feet, Officer Birk shot at Williams five times. |
| 2010-08-30 | Michael Sipes (17) | North Carolina (Morganton) | |
| 2010-08-29 | Unnamed man (42) | California (San Jose) | |
| 2010-08-29 | Clay Sannar (42) | California (Fresno) | |
| 2010-08-28 | Leonel Mateo (20) | California (Los Angeles) | LAPD officers found Mateos standing in the street after getting a call reporting an "assault with a deadly weapon, suspect there now," according to an LAPD news release. Officers said they observed Mateos striking the driver's side window of a stopped car with what they believed to be a handgun. There were two people inside the vehicle. At that point, Officer Shane Bau and his partner shot Mateos, authorities said. After the shooting, authorities determined Mateos was wielding a wooden baseball bat, not a gun. |
| 2010-08-27 | Brandon Barrett (28) | Utah (Salt Lake City) | Shot after shooting at police and injuring one officer in the leg. Police were responding to report of man armed with a rifle pacing on a busy street. |
| 2010-08-25 | Wayne Scott Creach (74) | Washington (Spokane Valley) | Shot with handgun in back waistband after approaching unmarked police car in parking lot of Creach's business around 11 pm. The family reported the Creach thought he had heard a burglar and had gone outside to investigate. |
| 2010-08-23 | Garfield Romale King (32) | Illinois (Chicago) | Police say King led officers on a car chase after an attempted traffic stop. The chase ended with a crash. Police say King then rammed his car into another squad car, pinning and injuring a third officer. The impact also caused King's car to catch fire. Officials said that's when they opened fire, killing King. |
| 2010-08-21 | Unnamed man | North Carolina (Greensboro) | |
| 2010-08-20 | Tarnorris Tyrell Gaye (19) | Florida (Miami) | Shot after pointing shotgun at officer. |
| 2010-08-16 | Ariel Rosenfeld (43) | Washington (Seattle) | Shot after man pulled gun from his waistband during fight with police. Officers were at man's place of employment to arrest him for investigation of domestic violence the night before. |
| 2010-08-14 | Gibson Belizaire (21) | Florida (Miami) | Shot after firing at police officers multiple times. |
| 2010-08-13 | Maurell McClendon (88) | Texas (Lufkin) | Preliminary investigations indicate when officers arrived they found a man, later identified as Maurell McClendon on the front porch armed with a shotgun. Witnesses told investigators the initial officers on the scene commanded McClendon to "drop the gun," but instead the alleged shooter moved toward his ex-wife who was already down. There are conflicting reports that McClendon fired a shot at his ex-wife before officers shot him. |
| 2010-08-11 | Unnamed man | Oregon (Medford) | |
| 2010-08-11 | Joeell Lee Johnson (16) | Florida (Miami) | Shot after pointing a gun at an undercover officer during a robbery Sting operation. |
| 2010-08-11 | Arthur McDonald (60) | New Jersey (Franklin Township) | |
| 2010-08-10 | Troy Geske (41) | Colorado (Pueblo) | Died from "positional asphyxia" while being restrained face down in police custody in the forensic unit of the state mental hospital. |
| 2010-08-06 | Eric Wells (30) | Indiana (Indianapolis) | Killed when the motorcycle he was riding was struck by a patrol car driven by on-duty officer David Bisard, whose blood-alcohol level at the time of the accident was 0.19. |
| 2010-08-05 | Joey Carl (17) | Minnesota (Duluth) | Video shows Carl coming out from behind two cars and charging at the squad car with a baseball bat. He starts smashing in the squad's windshield. Keast attempts to reverse his car as the teen continues to strike. The squad car hits a vehicle behind it and comes to a stop. Carl then makes his way to the driver's side window and continues pounding on the squad car. Keast yells at him telling him to put the bat down. A single shot is fired and hits Carl in the chest. |
| 2010-08-04 | Keith Ritchi (39) | Florida (Brooksville) | |
| 2010-08-04 | Garry Ray Daniels (24) | California (Bakersfield) | Daniels had injured the manager of the Rankin Hotel and was brandishing a knife when he was shot twice and mortally wounded by Bakersfield Police Officer Christopher Knutson. Daniels died at Kern Medical Center. |
| 2010-08-03 | Blair Damon (37) | Indiana (Charlestown) | |
| 2010-08-02 | Robert Capkovic (62) | Florida (Spring Hill) | |
| 2010-08-01 | Alfred Raymond Vigil (62) | Colorado (Denver) | Vigil called 911 and stated that he wanted to die via "suicide by cop". Officers arrived on scene to find Vigil holding a gun to his head. After ignoring repeated calls to drop the weapon, Vigil pointed the weapon at the officers. The four officers fired a total 12 rounds, killing Vigil. |

== See also ==
- Death in custody § United States
- Henry A. Wallace Police Crime Public Database
- List of cases of police brutality
- List of countries with annual rates and counts for killings by law enforcement officers
- List of law enforcement officers killed in the line of duty in the United States
- List of law enforcement officers convicted for an on-duty killing in the United States
- List of shootings by US immigration agents
- List of police reforms related to the George Floyd protests
- List of unarmed African Americans killed by law enforcement officers in the United States
- Lists of killings by law enforcement officers
- Police brutality in the United States
- Police misconduct § United States
- Police riot § United States
- Police use of deadly force in the United States
