= Liberty Township, Marion County, Kansas =

Liberty Township Marion County, Kansas
- Township
- Location within Marion County

- Location within the state of Kansas
- Coordinates: 38.3036559°N 97.2059498°W
- Country: United States
- State: Kansas
- County: Marion

Area
  - Total: 36 sq mi (93 km^{2})

Dimensions
  - Length: 6.0 mi (9.7 km)
  - Width: 6.0 mi (9.7 km)
- Elevation: 1,362 ft (415 m)

Population (2020)
  - Total: 345
  - Density: 9.6/sq mi (3.7/km^{2})
- Time zone: UTC-6 (CST)
  - Summer (DST): UTC-5 (CDT)
- Area code: 620
- FIPS code: 20-40225
- GNIS ID: 477341
- Website: County website

Liberty Township is a township in Marion County, Kansas, United States. As of the 2020 census, the township population was 345, not including the city of Hillsboro.

== Geography ==
Liberty Township covers an area of 36 square miles (93.2 km^{2}).

== Communities ==
The township contains the following settlements:

- City of Hillsboro (south of D Street). The northern part is located in Risley Township.
- Ghost town of Gnadenau.

== Cemeteries ==
The township contains the following cemeteries:

- Alexanderfeld Cemetery (a.k.a. Church of God in Christ Cemetery), located in Section 4 T20S R2E.
- Ebenfeld Mennonite Brethren Church Cemetery, located in Section 25 T20S R2E.
- Gard Cemetery, located in Section 24 T20S R2E.
- Gnadenau Church Cemetery #1 (There are no stones, records are in Library at Tabor College), located in Section 11 T20S R2E.
- Gnadenau Church Cemetery #2 (a.k.a. Parkview Cemetery) (a.k.a. Grace Meadow Cemetery), located in Section 9 T20S R2E.
- Haven of Rest Cemetery (includes Ebenezer of Bruderthal and First Mennonite sections), located in Section 2 T20S R2E.
- Hope Valley Cemetery, located in Section 17 T20S R2E.
- Jost Cemetery, located in Section 5 T20S R2E.
- Mennonite Brethren Church Cemetery of Hillsboro, located in Section 3 T20S R2E.
- Salem Orphan's Home Cemetery, located in Section 2 T20S R2E.

== Transportation ==
No major highways or railroads pass through the township.
