= Durham, Kansas =

City in Marion County, Kansas

- City
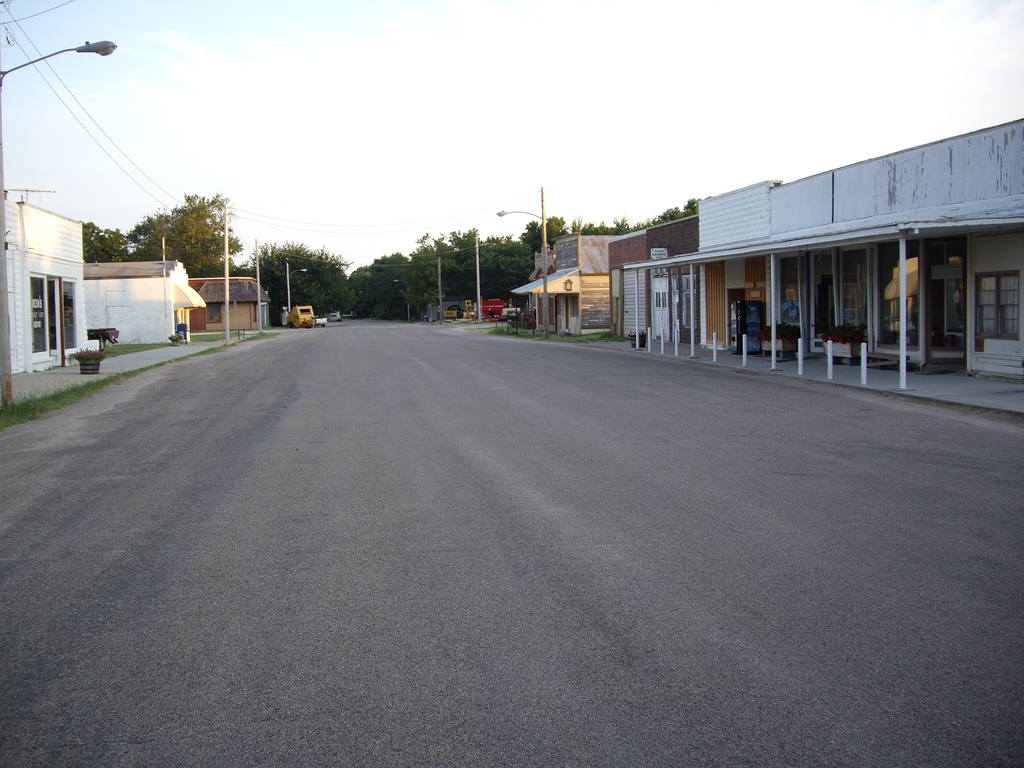
- Downtown Durham (2010)

- Location within Marion County and Kansas

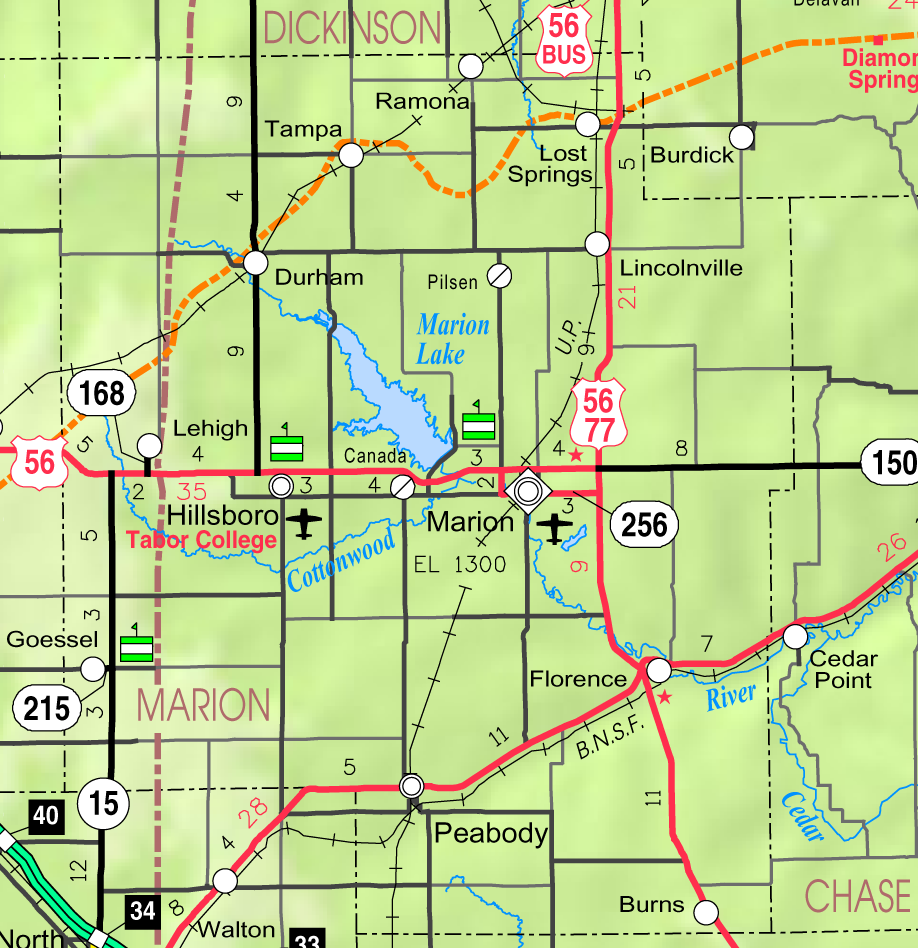
- KDOT map of Marion County (legend)
- Coordinates: 38°29′04″N 97°13′37″W
- Country: United States
- State: Kansas
- County: Marion
- Township: Durham Park
- Platted: 1887 (Durham); 1887 (Funk)
- Incorporated: 1906
- Named for: Durham cattle

Government
  - Type: Mayor–Council
  - Mayor: Michael Sorensen

Area
  - Total: 0.17 sq mi (0.45 km^{2})
  - Land: 0.17 sq mi (0.45 km^{2})
  - Water: 0 sq mi (0.00 km^{2})
- Elevation: 1,371 ft (418 m)

Population (2020)
  - Total: 89
  - Density: 510/sq mi (200/km^{2})
- Time zone: UTC-6 (CST)
  - Summer (DST): UTC-5 (CDT)
- ZIP Code: 67438
- Area code: 620
- FIPS code: 20-19050
- GNIS ID: 2394582

Durham is a city in Marion County, Kansas, United States. As of the 2020 census, the population of the city was 89. The city took its name from Durham cattle. It is located about 8.5 miles (14 km) north of Hillsboro on the west side of K-15 highway next to a railroad.

== History ==
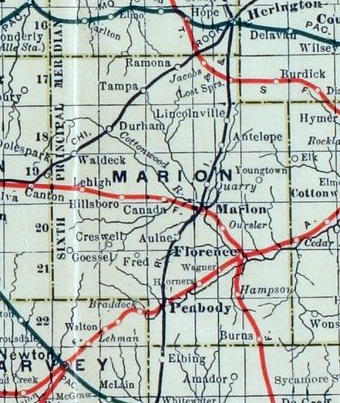
1915 railroad map of Marion County

=== Early history ===
For many millennia, the Great Plains of North America was inhabited by nomadic Native Americans. From the 16th century to 18th century, the Kingdom of France claimed ownership of large parts of North America. In 1762, after the French and Indian War, France secretly ceded New France to Spain, per the Treaty of Fontainebleau.

=== 19th century ===
In 1802, Spain returned most of the land to France. In 1803, most of the land for modern day Kansas was acquired by the United States from France as part of the 828,000-square-mile (2,140,000 km^{2}) Louisiana Purchase for 2.83 cents per acre (7.0 ¢/ha).

In 1806, Zebulon Pike led the Pike Expedition westward from St Louis, Missouri, of which part of their journey followed the Cottonwood River through Marion County near the current cities of Florence, Marion, Durham.

From the 1820s to the 1870s, one of the most significant land routes in the United States was the Santa Fe Trail. It was located about 1 mile (1.5 km) northwest of Durham. The trail was active across Marion County from 1821 to 1866.

In 1854, the Kansas Territory was organized, then in 1861 Kansas became the 34th U.S. state. In 1855, Marion County was established within the Kansas Territory, which included the land for modern day Durham.

In 1887, the Chicago, Kansas and Nebraska Railway built a main line from Herington through Durham to Pratt. In 1888, this line was extended to Liberal. Later, it was extended to Tucumcari, New Mexico and El Paso, Texas. It foreclosed in 1891 and taken over by Chicago, Rock Island and Pacific Railway, which shut down in 1980 and reorganized as Oklahoma, Kansas and Texas Railroad, merged in 1988 with Missouri Pacific Railroad, and finally merged in 1997 with Union Pacific Railroad. Most locals still refer to this railroad as the "Rock Island".

A post office was established in Durham Park on June 22, 1874 (near current Cottonwood Grove Christian School northwest of Durham), then it was moved to the community of Durham on September 19, 1887 around the time the new railroad was built through the area.

=== 20th century ===
In 1906, Durham incorporated as a city.

In 1962, James C. Donahue established the Donahue Corporation, maker of farm implement carriers, and has grown to a 40,000 sq ft (3,700 m^{2}) facility. They have built and distributed over 50,000 implement carriers. It currently is located approximately 0.5 miles (0.8 km) northeast of Durham on 290th St.

== Geography ==
Durham is located at coordinates 38.4861202, -97.2280808 in the scenic Flint Hills and Great Plains of the state of Kansas. According to the United States Census Bureau, the city has a total area of 0.20 square miles (0.52 km^{2}), all land.

=== Climate ===
The climate in this area is characterized by hot, humid summers and generally mild to cool winters. According to the Köppen Climate Classification system, Durham has a humid subtropical climate, abbreviated "Cfa" on climate maps.

== Area attractions ==
Durham has one listing on the National Register of Historic Places (NRHP).

- Santa Fe Trail:
  - Santa Fe Trail - Marion County Segments (NRHP), 2.5 miles (4.0 km) south-west of Durham. From corner of 270th St and Falcon Rd, parallels on west side of railroad tracks towards southwest. The ruts are approximately 3 miles (4.8 km) long, and described by the National Park Service as "outstanding". Not open to public.
  - Santa Fe Trail Cottonwood Crossing Kiosk, 1 west at 290th St.
  - Santa Fe Trail Cottonwood Crossing Marker, north-west of Durham.
  - Santa Fe Trail Markers, numerous markers in the area.
  - Santa Fe Trail Self-Guided Auto Tour.
- Marion Reservoir, south-east of Durham.

== Demographics ==
Historical population
Census	Pop.	Note	%±
1910	268		—
1920	288		7.5%
1930	254		−11.8%
1940	245		−3.5%
1950	229		−6.5%
1960	183		−20.1%
1970	143		−21.9%
1980	130		−9.1%
1990	119		−8.5%
2000	114		−4.2%
2010	112		−1.8%
2020	89		−20.5%
U.S. Decennial Census

=== 2020 census ===
The 2020 United States census counted 89 people, 49 households, and 33 families in Durham. The population density was 511.5 per square mile (197.5/km^{2}). There were 58 housing units at an average density of 333.3 per square mile (128.7/km^{2}). The racial makeup was 93.26% (83) white or European American (86.52% non-Hispanic white), 0.0% (0) black or African-American, 2.25% (2) Native American or Alaska Native, 0.0% (0) Asian, 0.0% (0) Pacific Islander or Native Hawaiian, 1.12% (1) from other races, and 3.37% (3) from two or more races. Hispanic or Latino of any race was 8.99% (8) of the population.

Of the 49 households, 26.5% had children under the age of 18; 53.1% were married couples living together; 32.7% had a female householder with no spouse or partner present. 28.6% of households consisted of individuals and 22.4% had someone living alone who was 65 years of age or older. The average household size was 1.8 and the average family size was 2.1. The percent of those with a bachelor's degree or higher was estimated to be 2.2% of the population.

15.7% of the population was under the age of 18, 5.6% from 18 to 24, 24.7% from 25 to 44, 19.1% from 45 to 64, and 34.8% who were 65 years of age or older. The median age was 53.2 years. For every 100 females, there were 102.3 males. For every 100 females ages 18 and older, there were 114.3 males.

The 2016–2020 5-year American Community Survey estimates show that the median household income was $40,000 (with a margin of error of +/- $11,322) and the median family income was $46,250 (+/- $12,899). Males had a median income of $41,250 (+/- $29,334). Approximately, 0.0% of families and 7.0% of the population were below the poverty line, including 0.0% of those under the age of 18 and 7.0% of those ages 65 or over.

=== 2010 census ===
As of the census of 2010, there were 112 people, 48 households, and 34 families residing in the city. The population density was 560.0 inhabitants per square mile (216.2/km^{2}). There were 65 housing units at an average density of 325.0 per square mile (125.5/km^{2}). The racial makeup of the city was 99.1% White and 0.9% from other races. Hispanic or Latino of any race were 4.5% of the population.

There were 48 households, of which 25.0% had children under the age of 18 living with them, 66.7% were married couples living together, 4.2% had a female householder with no husband present, and 29.2% were non-families. 25.0% of all households were made up of individuals, and 12.5% had someone living alone who was 65 years of age or older. The average household size was 2.33 and the average family size was 2.79.

The median age in the city was 47 years. 20.5% of residents were under the age of 18; 5.5% were between the ages of 18 and 24; 22.4% were from 25 to 44; 27.7% were from 45 to 64; and 24.1% were 65 years of age or older. The gender makeup of the city was 51.8% male and 48.2% female.

== Economy ==
Durham is home of Donahue Corporation.

== Government ==
The Durham government consists of a mayor and five council members. The council meets the 1st Tuesday after the 1st Monday of each month at 7PM.

- Fire Department, Douglas Ave.
- Durham Community Center, Douglas Ave.
- U.S. Post Office, 508 S Douglas Ave.

== Education ==
=== Public ===
The community is served by Hillsboro USD 410 public school district. The high school is a member of T.E.E.N., a shared video teaching network between five area high schools. All students attend schools in Hillsboro.

- Hillsboro High School, located in Hillsboro.
- Hillsboro Middle School, located in Hillsboro.
- Hillsboro Elementary School, located in Hillsboro.

Durham schools were closed through school unification. The Durham Hornets won the Kansas State High School boys class BB basketball championship in 1963.

=== Private ===
- Cottonwood Grove Christian School, Private Grade School, 2925 Goldenrod Rd, approximately 1 mile northwest of Durham.

== Media ==
=== Print ===
- The Herington Times, newspaper from Herington.
- Marion County Record, newspaper from Marion.
- Hillsboro Free Press, free newspaper for greater Marion County area.

== Infrastructure ==
=== Transportation ===
K-15 highway runs along the east side of the city. Durham is served by the Union Pacific Railroad, formerly the Southern Pacific, and prior, the Chicago, Rock Island and Pacific Railroad. Durham is located on UP's Golden State main line to El Paso, Texas. A Union Pacific Local still serves the Durham Elevator during the Kansas summer harvests. The line was originally built by the Chicago, Kansas and Nebraska Railroad.

=== Utilities ===
- Internet
  - Wireless is provided by Pixius Communications.
  - Satellite is provided by HughesNet, StarBand, WildBlue.
- TV
  - Satellite is provided by DirecTV, Dish Network.
  - Terrestrial is provided by regional digital TV stations.
- Electricity
  - Rural is provided by Flint Hills RECA.
- Water
  - City is provided by City of Durham.
  - Rural is provided by Marion County RWD #1 and #4.

== See also ==
- National Register of Historic Places listings in Marion County, Kansas
- Historical Maps of Marion County, Kansas
