= Durham Park Township, Kansas =

Durham Park Township Marion County, Kansas
- Township
- Location within Marion County

- Location within the state of Kansas
- Coordinates: 38.4786936°N 97.2061516°W
- Country: United States
- State: Kansas
- County: Marion

Area
  - Total: 36 sq mi (93 km^{2})

Dimensions
  - Length: 6.0 mi (9.7 km)
  - Width: 6.0 mi (9.7 km)
- Elevation: 1,388 ft (423 m)

Population (2020)
  - Total: 213
  - Density: 5.9/sq mi (2.3/km^{2})
- Time zone: UTC-6 (CST)
  - Summer (DST): UTC-5 (CDT)
- Area code: 620
- FIPS code: 20-19100
- GNIS ID: 477121
- Website: County website

Durham Park Township is a township in Marion County, Kansas, United States. As of the 2020 census, the township population was 213, including the city of Durham.

== Geography ==
Durham Park Township covers an area of 36 square miles (93.2 km^{2}).

== Communities ==
The township contains the following settlements:

- City of Durham.

== Cemeteries ==
The township contains the following cemeteries:

- Durham Park Cemetery, located in Section 21 18S 2E.
- Frick Cemetery, located in Section 15 18S 2E.
