= Hans Einstein =

Scientist and Expert of Valley Fever (1923-2012)

- Born: Hans Emil Einstein; February 3, 1923; Berlin, Germany
- Died: August 11, 2012 (aged 89)
- Occupation: Physician
- Years active: 1946–2012
- Website: www.valleyfever.com

Hans E. Einstein (February 3, 1923 – August 11, 2012) was the foremost authority on the lung disease Valley Fever. He lived in Bakersfield, California. He was a first cousin, twice removed, of physicist Albert Einstein, as Hans's grandfather and Albert were first cousins.

== Biography ==
Einstein was born in Berlin, the son of Josefa Spiero Einstein Warburg and Dr. Fritz Einstein. He spent his childhood in Hamburg, Germany as Nazism gradually took hold. His parents were Quakers, but of Jewish origin. A year after Hitler took power in 1934, his mother moved Einstein and his sister to the Netherlands, leaving his father behind. He finished high school at Eerde, a boarding school in the Netherlands at age 16 and moved to the United States as an exchange student. He attended Furman University in Greenville, South Carolina. One of the first things he did upon arriving was look up his last name in the phone book. The only Einstein he found was a relative: Albert Einstein's son, Hans Albert Einstein. They became friends and he was often invited over whenever Albert visited. He earned his medical degree from New York Medical College in 1946 and did his internship at Paterson General Hospital in Paterson, New Jersey. Following that, he became a medical officer in the United States Army. He then completed residencies in Internal Medicine and Pulmonary Diseases at the New York Veterans Hospitals.

In 1951, he drove across the United States to Kern General Hospital (now Kern Medical Center) in Bakersfield, California. After completing his residency, Einstein became the assistant medical director of the Kern County tuberculosis sanitarium in Keene. While there, he realized that some patients had Valley Fever rather than Tuberculosis. This spurred his lifelong study of the endemic disease Valley Fever which continued throughout his career. Einstein subsequently opened a private practice and co-founded a medical group in Bakersfield, specializing in Internal Medicine. While maintaining his private practice, he gave weekly lectures and led grand rounds at Los Angeles County+USC Medical Center starting in 1962.

In 1978, Einstein was offered the Barlow Chair at USC, which he agreed to do for ten years. He closed his private practice and left Bakersfield to become Medical Director and CEO of Barlow Respiratory Hospital in Los Angeles, CA. He also was a physician and educator at the USC School of Medicine and even served on the Board of Directors for the hospital until 2012. While living in Los Angeles, he also spent time directing staff and education programs at Los Angeles Good Samaritan Hospital, served as President of the LA chapter of the American Lung Association for one year, and opened an early AIDS treatment center at Barlow Respiratory Hospital. In 1988, Einstein was offered the position of Medical Director at both Los Angeles Good Samaritan and Bakersfield Memorial Hospitals. He chose to move back to Bakersfield to be near his long-time friends, also promising them only ten years. He was Medical Director at Bakersfield Memorial Hospital until his retirement in 1999. After this, he continued treating patients at the Kern County Public Health Department's Tuberculosis Clinic. He also treated patients at the Valley Fever Clinic at Kern Medical Center, started the Respiratory Technician program at San Joaquin Valley College, taught at California State University Bakersfield, and established a need- and academic-based scholarship for pre-medical students at CSUB.

=== Hospital appointments ===
- Barlow Respiratory Hospital, Los Angeles, CA (Faculty 1970-1978, Medical Director and CEO 1978-1988, Board of Directors 1988-2012)
- Bakersfield Memorial Hospital, Bakersfield, CA (Medical Director 1988-1999)
- Kern Medical Center, Bakersfield, CA (1953-2012, Chief of Medical Service 1958-1961)
- Clinician, Tuberculosis Clinic, Kern County Health Department (1988-2012)
- Mercy Hospital, Bakersfield, CA (1988-2012)
- LAC/USC Medical Center, Los Angeles, CA (1962-1988)
- The Hospital of the Good Samaritan, Los Angeles, CA (1978-1988)

=== Academic appointments ===
- Medical Director, Division of Respiratory Care, San Joaquin Valley College (1991-2012)
- Professor, Clinical Medicine, USC Keck School of Medicine (1975-1998, Emeritus 1999-2012)

== Personal life ==
Parents: Dr. Fritz Einstein (deceased) and Josefa Spiero Einstein Warburg (deceased)
Sister: Heilwig Einstein Odlivak of NY, NY (deceased);, Half-sister, Christina Mills (Maria Warburg) of London, GB; Half-brother: Frank Einstein (wife, Nancy Stetten) of Nashville, TN, USA; Half-sister: Iris Warburg (deceased); step-sister: Camilla England of Santa Fe, NM, USA.

- Married Mary Elizabeth Lake in 1943. Three daughters: Emily Ann Einstein (1943), Paula Lynn Einstein (1954), and Elizabeth Eve Einstein (1962).
- Married Merle Ryden in 1969. One step-daughter: Sheryl Tynes (1960).
- Married Carolyn Faye Alison in 1989. One adopted daughter; Jessica Einstein (1987).

The Hans E. Einstein, M.D. Pavilion at Bakersfield Memorial Hospital is named in his honor and opened in 2012.

== Bibliography ==
- "Valley fever research pioneer dead at 89". Bakersfield Now. August 13, 2012. Archived from the original on 28 July 2013.
- "History of Valley Fever". County of Kern Public Health Services Department. Archived from the original on November 17, 2014.
- Mayer, Steven (June 25, 2011). "Valley fever pioneer still searching for 'the ultimate answer'". The Bakersfield Californian.
- "The Annual Hans E Einstein Lectureship". Barlow Respiratory Hospital.
