= Risley Township, Kansas =

Risley Township Marion County, Kansas
- Township
- Location within Marion County

- Location within the state of Kansas
- Coordinates: 38.3933331°N 97.2064882°W
- Country: United States
- State: Kansas
- County: Marion

Area
  - Total: 36 sq mi (93 km^{2})

Dimensions
  - Length: 6.0 mi (9.7 km)
  - Width: 6.0 mi (9.7 km)
- Elevation: 1,398 ft (426 m)

Population (2020)
  - Total: 225
  - Density: 6.2/sq mi (2.4/km^{2})
- Time zone: UTC-6 (CST)
  - Summer (DST): UTC-5 (CDT)
- Area code: 620
- FIPS code: 20-60000
- GNIS ID: 477227
- Website: County website

Risley Township is a township in Marion County, Kansas, United States. As of the 2020 census, the township population was 225, not including the city of Hillsboro.

== Geography ==
Risley Township covers an area of 36 square miles (93.2 km^{2}).

== Cities and towns ==
The township contains the following settlements:

- City of Hillsboro (north of D Street). The southern part is located in Liberty Township.

== Cemeteries ==
The township contains the following cemeteries:

- French Creek Cemetery, located in Section 16 T19S R2E.
- Johannesthal Cemetery, located in Section 8 T19S R2E.
- Zion Lutheran Church Cemetery, located in Section 34 T19S R2E.

== Transportation ==
U.S. Route 56 and K-15 pass through the township.
