= Selma Calmes =

Anesthesiologist

Selma Calmes (1940, née Harrison) is an anesthesiologist and co-founder of the Anesthesia History Association.

== Early life ==
Calmes was born in Corregidor, an island in Manila Bay, Philippines that is legally part of Cavite City, in 1940; however, her family returned to the United States the same year she was born. Her father, a graduate of West Point military academy, was killed in 1944 while fighting in World War II, leaving her mother to raise three children. Calmes and her two brothers all contracted polio at a young age, which served as her inspiration for going into a medical career.

She attended Pomona College in Claremont, California, where she was encouraged to further her education instead of settling down and starting a family. She applied to Baylor College of Medicine in Houston, Texas and was one of three women accepted to a class of 84 students.

== Adult life and career ==
Previously Selma Harrison, she married one of her classmates the summer after her freshman year at Baylor College of Medicine and became Selma Harrison Calmes in 1958.

She graduated from Baylor in 1965 and initially began an internship in pediatrics, which was the most common specialty for female physicians at the time. However, she read an essay by Dr. Virginia Apgar that promoted anesthesiology as a specialty for women physicians with children and began a residency in anesthesiology in 1966 at the University of Pennsylvania. She was the only female resident in the program, which was leading in anesthesiology training during this time. The same year she gave birth to her first child and during the second year of her residency she became pregnant again.

After completing her residency in 1969, Calmes became a staff anesthesiologist and instructor in Pennsylvania until 1970, when she moved to California, which remains her current place of residence. There, she took a position as staff anesthesiologist at Valley Children's Hospital in Fresno.

Calmes was greatly inspired by her peers, other women physicians, and wrote various articles on Dr. Virginia Apgar, who had originally inspired her to pursue anesthesiology, as well as articles about women's history in anesthesiology. In 1982 she co-founded the Anesthesia History Association.

Calmes was named as chair of the department of anesthesiology at the Kern Medical Center in Bakersfield, California in 1986 and held the same title at Olive View-UCLA Medical Center in Sylmar, California in 1988. In 1994 she was named as vice-chair of the department of anesthesiology at UCLA School of Medicine in Los Angeles, California.
