= Tabor Bluejays =

- University: Tabor College
- Conference: KCAC
- NAIA: Region IV
- Athletic director: Jeff Brewer
- Location: Hillsboro, Kansas
- Varsity teams: 16
- Football stadium: Joel H. Wiens Stadium
- Basketball arena: Tabor College Gymnasium
- Baseball stadium: West Side Athletic Field
- Softball stadium: Bluejay Field
- Soccer stadium: Joel H. Wiens Stadium
- Tennis venue: Indoor Tennis Center
- Nickname: Bluejays
- Colors: Blue and gold
- Website: taborbluejays.com

The Tabor Bluejays are the athletic teams that represent Tabor College, located in Hillsboro, Kansas, in intercollegiate sports as a member of the National Association of Intercollegiate Athletics (NAIA), primarily competing in the Kansas Collegiate Athletic Conference (KCAC) since the 1968–69 academic year.

== Varsity teams ==
Tabor competes in 16 intercollegiate varsity sports:

Men's sports	Women's sports
Baseball	Basketball
Basketball	Cross country
Cross country	Golf
Football	Soccer
Golf	Softball
Soccer	Tennis
Tennis	Track and field^{1}
Track and field^{1}	Volleyball
^{1} – includes both indoor and outdoor

=== Women's basketball ===
Tabor college women's basketball team was nationally ranked in 2007.

=== Football ===
The current head football coach at Tabor is Mike Gardner. Coach Gardner returned to take over the 2010 season after serving as head coach for the 2004 and 2005 seasons, where the teams posted a combined record of 20 wins and 3 losses with two consecutive conference championships and two post-season appearances. In 2009, Tabor College built Joel Wiens Stadium, a new football complex that is shared with Hillsboro High School.

In 2012, Tabor redshirt Junior Brandon Brown was found murdered in nearby McPherson, Kansas. Two former members of the McPherson Bulldogs football team were charged. As of October 5, 2012, the investigation is ongoing.

== Facilities ==
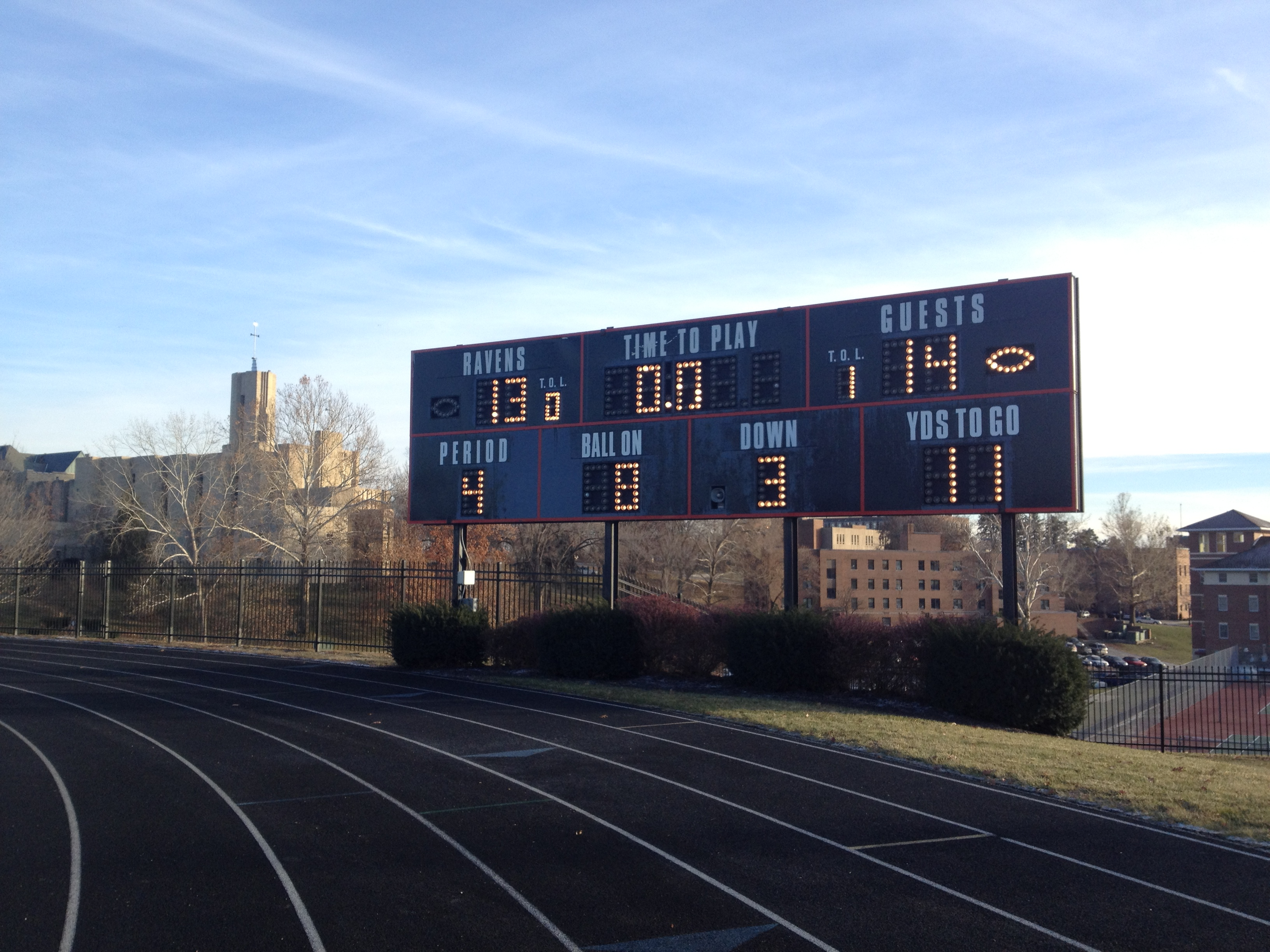
Scoreboard and athletics track at Joel H. Wiens Stadium in 2013

Venue	Sport(s)	Ref.
Joel H. Wiens Stadium	Football; Soccer; Track and field	
West Side Athletic Field	Baseball	
Bluejay Field	Baseball	
Tabor College Gymnasium	Basketball; Volleyball	
Indoor Tennis Center	Tennis	
