= Duane Goossen =

American politician

Kansas Secretary of Administration
- In office 2004–2011
- Governor: Sam Brownback
- Succeeded by: Dennis Taylor

Member of the Kansas House of Representatives from the 70th district
- In office January 10, 1983 – January 13, 1997
- Preceded by: William R. Novak
- Succeeded by: Donald Dahl

Personal details
- Born: August 21, 1955 (age 70) Newton, Kansas, U.S.
- Party: Republican

Duane Goossen (August 21, 1955) is the former Kansas Secretary of Administration and the Director of the Kansas Division of the Budget. Goossen has served as the Secretary of the Kansas Department of Administration since 2004 and Director of the Kansas Division of the Budget since 1998. Goossen also served in the Kansas House of Representatives 1983 to 1997.

Goossen has a Masters of Public Administration from the Kennedy School of Government, Harvard University, and has served as president of the National Association of State Budget Officers.
