= Donald Dahl =

American politician

Member of the Kansas House of Representatives from the 70th district
- In office January 13, 1997 – January 12, 2009
- Preceded by: Duane Goossen
- Succeeded by: J. Robert Brookens

Personal details
- Born: March 19, 1945 Hillsboro, Kansas, U.S.
- Died: April 18, 2014 (aged 69) Hillsboro, Kansas, U.S.
- Party: Republican
- Education: Tabor College

Military service
- Branch/service: United States Navy

Donald L. Dahl (March 19, 1945 – April 18, 2014) was an American politician.

Born in Hillsboro, Kansas, Dahl served in the United States Navy and then received his bachelor's degree from Tabor College. He served in the Kansas House of Representatives, as a Republican, from 1997 to 2008 and was speaker pro tem. In December 2013, Dahl was appointed to the Kansas Supreme Court Nominating Commission. He died while piloting an ultralight aircraft near Hillsboro, Kansas.
