= Valley Children's Hospital =

Valley Children’s Hospital
- Valley Children's Healthcare

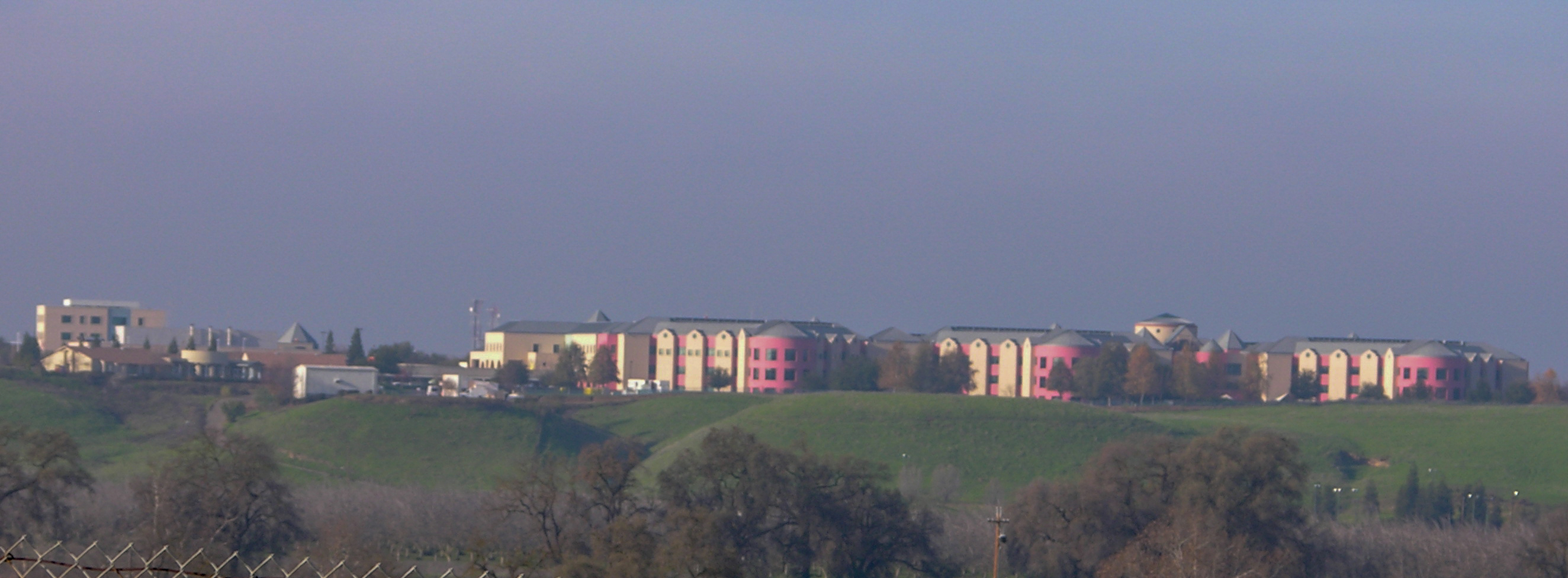
- A picture of the hospital from afar.

Geography
- Location: 9300 Valley Children's Pl, Madera, California, United States
- Coordinates: 36.884049°N 119.800262°W

Organization
- Type: Teaching
- Affiliated university: Stanford University School of Medicine

Services
- Emergency department: Level 2 Pediatric Trauma Center
- Beds: 358
- Speciality: Pediatrics

Helipads
- Helipad: FAA LID: 9CL6

History
- Former name: Children's Hospital Central California
- Opened: 1952

Links
- Website: www.valleychildrens.org
- Lists: Hospitals in California

Valley Children's Hospital (VCH), formerly Children's Hospital Central California is a stand-alone, pediatric acute care children's teaching hospital located in Madera County, California. The hospital has 358 pediatric beds and is affiliated the Stanford University School of Medicine. The hospital is a member of Valley Children's Healthcare and is one of only two children's hospitals in the network, servicing approximately 1.3 million children and adolescents in their coverage area. The hospital provides comprehensive pediatric specialties and subspecialties to infants, children, teens, and young adults aged 0–21 throughout Madera County, Fresno, and California. Valley Children's also sometimes treats adults that require pediatric care.

Valley Children's also features the only ACS verified Pediatric Trauma Center in the region, the only Level IV NICU in the Central Valley, and the only provider of pediatric extracorporeal life support (ECLS) for their service area. Valley Children's is one of the largest providers of pediatric health services in California and in the country. The hospital is adjacent to the Ronald McDonald House of the Central Valley.

== History ==
The organization was first founded on August 4, 1949, to help raise money to build a children's hospital. Carolyn Peck, Gail Goodwin, Helen Maupin, Agnes Crocket and Patty Randal proposed the idea of making the pediatric hospital in the valley and are now the Founding Mothers of Valley Children's Hospital. In the 1940s there were a small number of pediatric hospitals around the nation and none in the central valley. For three years, these women gathered support for building a pediatric hospital to benefit their children and the children from other families' health. The hospital later opened in 1952 at the intersection of Shields and Millbrook in central Fresno. In 1971 the regional NICU originally opened with a capacity eight beds.

The hospital opened their pediatric emergency department in 1975 to provide comprehensive pediatric emergency services to the region. In 1998 they moved to a 50-acre site in Madera County, on the other side of the San Joaquin River from Fresno.

In 2002 Valley Children's Hospital was renamed Children's Hospital Central California and then in 2014, they changed their name back to Valley Children's Hospital.

In 2014 the hospital had 12,695 pediatric inpatient admissions and performed 12,265 pediatric surgeries.

In June 2015, Valley Children's Healthcare announced a decision to separate from UCSF Fresno and instead partner with Stanford University for medical education and research.

In 2018, the hospital was officially verified as a Level II pediatric trauma center by the American College of Surgeons, making them the only pediatric trauma center in the region.

In late 2019 it was announced that Valley Children's Hospital had partnered with Universal Health Services to build a new 128-bed pediatric behavioral health hospital.

In early 2020, the hospital followed suit of hospitals all over the United States and implemented strict visitation protocols to help prevent the spread of COVID-19.

In 2024, Valley Children's Hospital executives received criticism for high compensation. As reported on the organization's Form 990, CEO Todd Suntrapak received compensation of over $5,000,000 in 2020 and 2021, with five other executives receiving compensation over $1,000,000, well above the average for similarly sized hospital systems. In addition, most of its legally mandated direct community investment was passed to its associated medical group, which was criticized by hospital finance experts as "gaming the system" and unusual. Fresno city councilmembers Miguel Arias and Garry Bredefeld asked for the state attorney general to investigate, while a hospital spokesperson stated the large compensation in 2020 and 2021 was as a result of an accounting change.

== About ==
The hospital provides a full range of pediatric specialties and subspecialties to infants, children, teens, and young adults aged 0–21 throughout the region through its main hospital and surrounding regions with its outpatient clinics.

The hospital features a state and ACS verified level 2 pediatric trauma center for critically injured trauma patients and also features two helipads for critical care and trauma care transport.

The hospital also features a state verified Level IV neonatal intensive care unit (highest possible) for critically ill neonatal patients.

== Awards ==
The hospital has been designated as a Magnet hospital by the American Nurse Credentialing Center four times; 2004, 2008, 2014, and 2019.

In 2018 the hospital ranked nationally in four specialties: neonatology, orthopedics, diabetes and endocrinology, and gastroenterology.

In 2019 the hospital was one of two children's hospitals in California to earn "Top Children's Hospital" status from The Leapfrog Group.

The hospital was named as the 10th largest children's hospital in the United States by Becker's Hospital Review.

As of 2021-22, Valley Children's Hospital has placed nationally in 7 ranked pediatric specialties on U.S. News & World Report.

2021-22 U.S. News & World Report Rankings for Valley Children's Hospital
Specialty	Rank (In the U.S.)	Score (Out of 100)
Neonatology	#31	81.5
Pediatric Diabetes & Endocrinology	#48	65.6
Pediatric Gastroenterology & GI Surgery	#43	67.8
Pediatric Neurology & Neurosurgery	#37	73.8
Pediatric Orthopedics	#24	71.4
Pediatric Pulmonology & Lung Surgery	#31	74.4
Pediatric Urology	#42	53.1

== Graduate Medical Education ==
Valley Children's Hospital serves as a training site for a variety of pediatric health professionals. Central Valley resident and fellow physicians in the fields of pediatrics, general surgery, anesthesia, emergency medicine, family medicine, critical care, and orthopedics routinely rotate through for their dedicated pediatric experience. While serving as a pediatric training site for resident physicians for over 40 years, Valley Children's hosted their inaugural class of pediatric resident physicians in 2017 and currently hosts 13 residents a year.

Established in 1999, the pediatric pharmacy residency is a one-year post-graduate training program, accepting 4 pharmacy residents a year, with a focus on pediatric pharmacy practice.

== Notable staff ==
- Selma Calmes, co-founder of the Anesthesia History Association

== See also ==
- List of Children's Hospitals in the United States
- Lucille Packard Children's Hospital
