= Brookins =

Brookins is both a surname and a given name. Notable people with the name include:

== People with the surname Brookins ==
- Angela Brookins (Jacki-O), American rapper
- Howard B. Brookins Sr. (born 1932), American politician
- Howard Brookins (born 1963), American politician
- Jonathan Brookins (born 1985), American MMA fighter
- Richard Brookins (1922–2018), the "American St. Nick" and soldier during World War II
- Sanford Augustus Brookins (1877–1968), American architect and builder
- Walter Brookins (1889–1953), American aviator

== People with the given name Brookins ==
- Brookins Campbell (1808–1853), American politician
