= J. Robert Brookens =

American politician

J. Roberts Brookens

Member of the Kansas House of Representatives from the 70th district
- In office January 12, 2009 – January 14, 2013
- Preceded by: Donald Dahl
- Succeeded by: John Barker

Personal details
- Born: February 8, 1950 (age 76)
- Party: Republican

J. Robert Brookens (February 8, 1950) is a former Republican member of the Kansas House of Representatives, representing the 70th district. He started serving in 2009.

Brookens did not run for re-election in 2012 and his term ended at the commencement of the 2013 legislative session.

== Committee membership ==
- Education
- Corrections and Juvenile Justice
- Judiciary

== Major donors ==
The top 5 donors to Brookens's 2008 campaign:

- 1. Kansas National Education Assoc $750
- 2. Mark A Nichols Dir of Public Affairs Rock Industries Inc $500
- 3. Brookens, John W $500
- 4. Kansas Contractors Assoc $500
- 5. Kansas Agribusiness Council $500
