= Joel Wiens Stadium =

Sports stadium in Hillsboro, Kandas, United States

- Interactive map of Joel Wiens Stadium
- Location: Hillsboro, Kansas
- Coordinates: 38°20′42″N 97°11′55″W
- Owner: Tabor College and Hillsboro USD 410 (joint)
- Operator: Tabor College and Hillsboro USD 410 (joint)
- Capacity: 2,500
- Surface: Turf

Construction
- Opened: 2009
- Cost: $5.8 million (US)

Tenant
- Tabor Bluejays

Joel Wiens Stadium is a sport stadium in Hillsboro, Kansas, United States. that opened in 2009, replacing Reimer Stadium. The facility is primarily used by the Tabor College and Hillsboro high school athletic teams. The stadium is also used for local high school sporting events and other community events. Ownership and operations of the facility are shared by both Tabor College and Hillsboro USD 410.
