= T. R. Schellenberg =

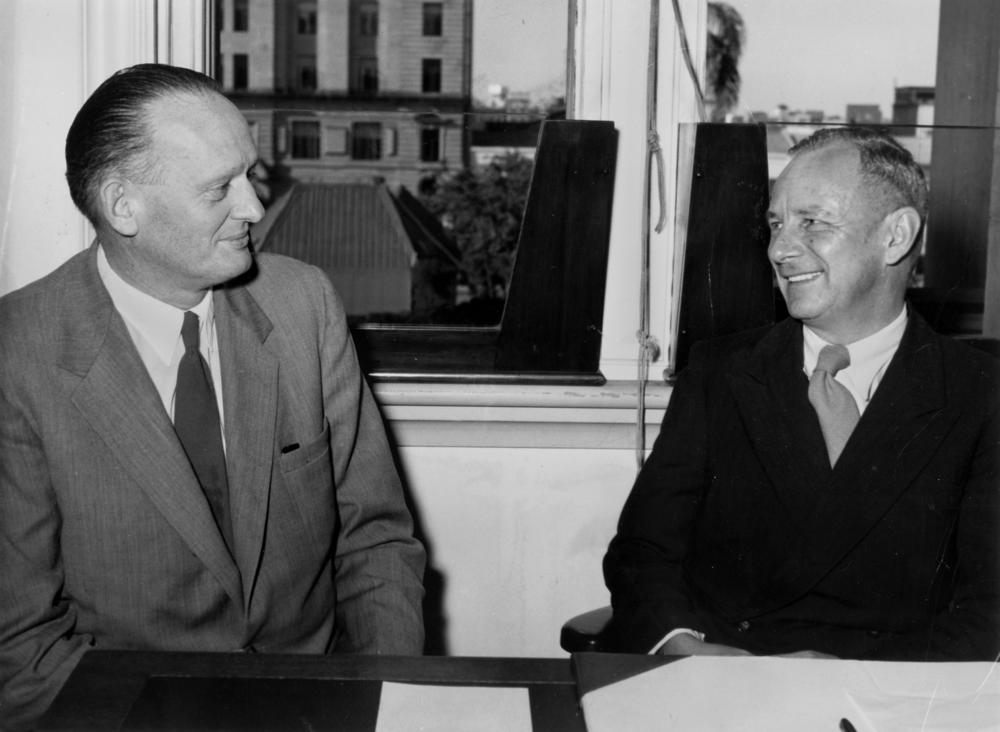
- T. R. Schellenberg (left) with James L. Stapleton, State Librarian of Queensland, 1954
- Born: 24 February 1903; Garden Township, Kansas, US
- Died: 14 January 1970 (aged 66); Fauquier County, Virginia, US
- Education: Tabor College (Kansas), University of Kansas, University of Pennsylvania
- Occupations: Archivist, Professor
- Organization(s): National Archives and Records Administration (USA)
- Known for: Assistant Archivist of the United States; The Appraisal of Modern Public Records; The Management of Archives

Theodore Roosevelt Schellenberg (24 February 1903 – 14 January 1970) was an American archivist and archival theorist. Schellenberg's publications and ideas are part of the foundation for archival theory and practice in the United States. In particular, Schellenberg is known for pioneering American archival ideas about appraisal.

== Early life ==
Theodore Roosevelt Schellenberg was born on February 24, 1903, to Abraham Lawrence and Sarah Schroeder Schellenberg in Garden Township, Harvey County, Kansas. Prior to Theodore's birth, his parents had decided to emigrate to the United States in 1879 to avoid the introduction of Russification in their native country, Russia. There was a large immigration population of Mennonites in Kansas during this time, which allowed Abraham Schellenberg to continue working as a leader for the Mennonite Brethren.

== Education ==
In his youth, T. R. Schellenberg attended McPherson Elementary School (1908–1912) and Hillsboro Middle School (1912–1915). He went on to attend Hillsboro High School (1916–1918), but he later finished his high school career at Tabor Academy (1919–1922). From there, Schellenberg briefly attended Tabor College (1924–1926) before transferring to the University of Kansas. Here, he graduated in 1928 with a Bachelor's degree in History and received a Master's degree in History in 1930. After receiving both his Bachelor's and Master's at the University of Kansas, he finished his education at the University of Pennsylvania, where he received a Ph.D in 1934. His dissertation topic was "The European Background of the Monroe Doctrine, 1818 to 1923."

== Career ==
Upon completing his doctorate, Schellenberg secured a position with the Joint Committee on Materials for Research as Executive Secretary, part of the American Council of Learned Societies and the Social Science Research Council. In the following year, he was hired within the National Archives and Records Administration (NARA) as a Deputy Examiner, part of a group of academics who were tasked with examining the records of executive agencies in Washington D.C. In 1938, he was appointed chief of the Division of Agriculture Department Archives, which he eventually left in 1945. It was in this position that he published his first paper in 1939, European Archival Practices in Arranging Records, which laid the groundwork for his life's work. In it, he observed that European methods only applied to U.S. records management in a limited way. Americans were creating documents at an unprecedented rate, and European archival practices did not adequately respond to the changing needs of American records management. Experiencing this issue firsthand during his work at NARA, Schellenberg's theory of the archives came from the practical need to adapt European archival practices to working with the massive scale of the federal records climate.

Schellenberg briefly left NARA for three years at the close of WWII in 1945, when he took a job as a Records Officer in the Office of Price Administration. His work there illustrated the many difficulties found in managing vast amounts of government records, which only increased his commitment to finding solutions. In 1948, he returned to NARA as Program Adviser to the Archivist and published his first major work in 1949 called Disposition of Federal Records: How to Develop an Effective Program for the Preservation and Disposal of Federal Records.

Schellenberg was promoted to Director of Archival Management in 1950 and served in that capacity until 1962. One of his first projects was to craft a rigorous training program for NARA employees because there was an inadequate standardization in his division's policies and procedures. He also created guidelines for how positions would be categorized and ensured that job descriptions were consistent. Schellenberg continued to provide archival training throughout his tenure at NARA by planning a two-semester course at American University, organizing a series of symposiums for senior archivists, and traveling to records centers throughout the U.S. to provide three-day classes on archives management. Schellenberg also oversaw a massive reappraisal of documents to deaccession old records and enforced a methodology more selective in the appraisal of new records. He then went on to serve as the assistant archivist of the United States until he retired in 1963.

== Influence ==
=== Schellenberg on appraisal ===
Schellenberg's major contribution to archival practice was emphasizing the centrality of appraisal in archival work and making selection a primary role of the archivist. To Schellenberg, a record has "primary value" to the creator as evidence of activities, but also has "secondary value" (i.e. evidential or informational value) to future users of the records outside of the originating agency, such as other agencies, historians, or private users. He argued the most efficient way to deal with the sheer volume of records that archives were dealing with at the time was to differentiate between a record's primary and secondary value and, thus, determine the relative value of the records based on the secondary value of the records. This differentiation was key for Schellenberg as he argued for a greater distinction between records and archives. In his definition, records only have current, primary value to their creators, but archives are records deemed to have significant secondary value by an archivist (i.e. meriting permanent preservation) outside of their original value to the record's creators. Consequently, records were under the purview of records managers, and only those records holding value for future users (particularly for future historical inquiry) would become a part of the archives.

According to Schellenberg, a record's overall value can be appraised based on three distinct criteria:

- Uniqueness: The information contained in the record cannot be found anywhere else and must not have been duplicated. This can determine how unique the record is.
- Form: The extent to which the information is formatted as well as the form of records themselves should both be considered. The hardware the information is stored on or the hardware needed to read the information should also be taken into account.
- Importance: When appraising records, the needs of the federal government should take precedence before the needs of historians and social scientists. Historical significance of the records should also be taken into account.

=== Modern Archives: Principles and Techniques ===
In 1954, Schellenberg was given the opportunity to travel to Australia through the Fulbright Program to assist Australians in creating an archival system suited to their archival issues. He spent months helping address records management concerns through a lecture and seminar series that allowed him to travel throughout the continent and even to Tasmania and New Zealand. During this time, his lecture and seminar notes began to take the shape of a textbook on archival work and management practices. In 1956, he published this work as the acclaimed text Modern Archives: Principles and Techniques—thus creating the first exhaustive American approach to archival administration.

The book explores emerging issues, concerns, and approaches to archival theory and practice that modern archivists encounter, thereby reflecting the desire for a closer and more efficient working relationship between records management and archival work and giving readers a broad overview of principles of public records management. In responding to modern archival problems, particularly distinctly American archival concerns, the book also juxtaposes American archival work and theory with those of foreign countries to clarify the fundamental nature and methods of archives, records management, and archival management.

Schellenberg's textbook was largely well received in the archival field, both in America and internationally, and quickly became a central text for students in archival training programs. After the publication, historian and archivist Waldo Gifford Leland positively reviewed the text in the October 1956 issue of the American Archivist, stating: "This compact and well written book is, at least in the opinion of the reviewer, the most significant and useful statement yet produced on the administration of modern records and archives." In the following year, Schellenberg won a meritorious service award to honor the contributions made to the archival profession through the textbook.

== Principal publications ==
- Schellenberg, Theodore R. (1956). Modern Archives: Principles and Techniques. Chicago: University of Chicago Press.1996 reprint online.
- Schellenberg, Theodore R. (1965). The Management of Archives. New York: Columbia University Press. 1988 reprint online.
