= Hillsboro, Kansas =

City in Marion County, Kansas

- City
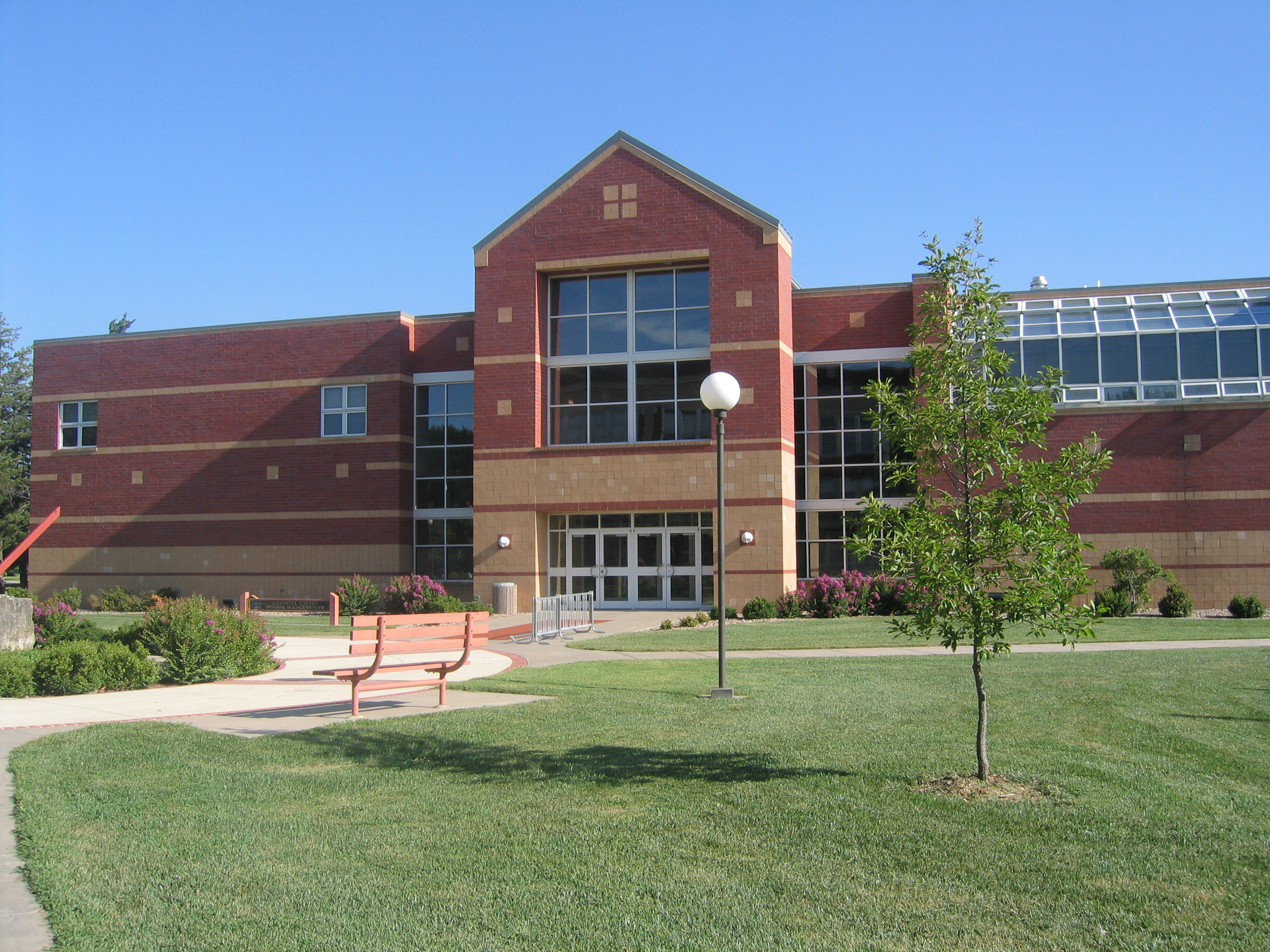
- Natural Science Center on Tabor College campus (2007)

- Location within Marion County and Kansas

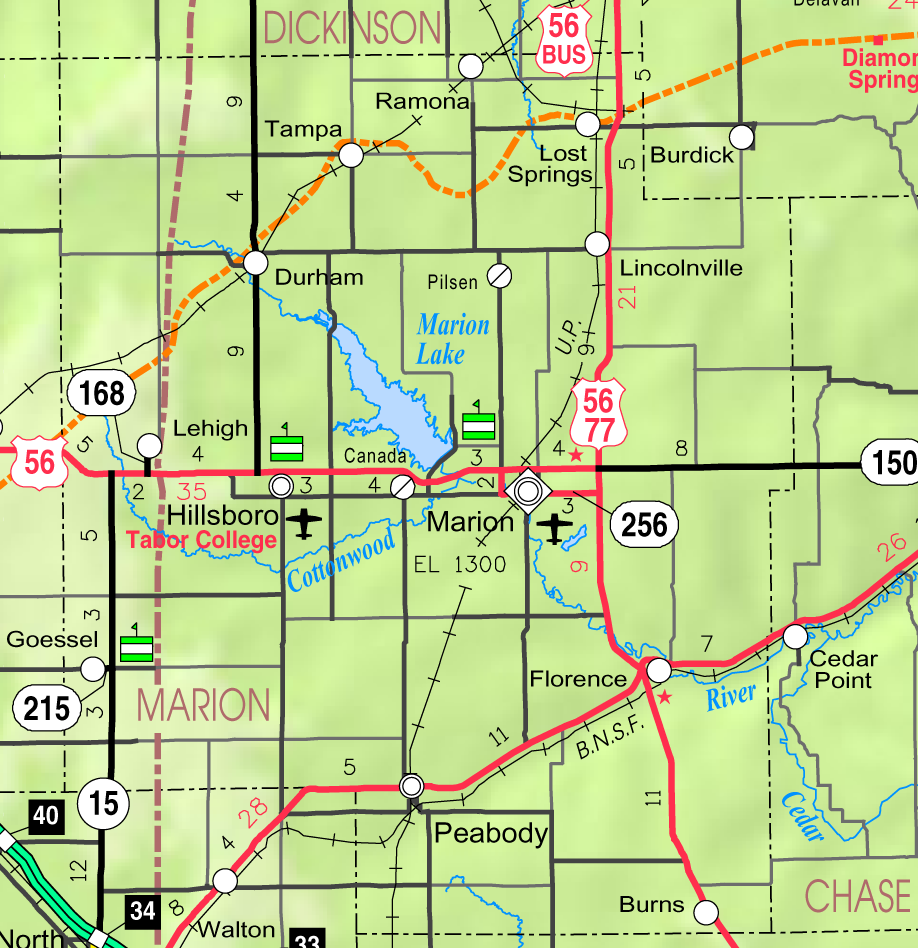
- KDOT map of Marion County (legend)
- Coordinates: 38°21′10″N 97°11′57″W
- Country: United States
- State: Kansas
- County: Marion
- Township: Liberty, Risley
- Platted: 1879
- Incorporated: 1884
- Named for: John Hill

Government
  - Type: Mayor–Council
  - Mayor: Lou Thurston
  - City Administrator: Matthew Stiles

Area
  - Total: 2.46 sq mi (6.36 km^{2})
  - Land: 2.44 sq mi (6.32 km^{2})
  - Water: 0.015 sq mi (0.04 km^{2})
- Elevation: 1,434 ft (437 m)

Population (2020)
  - Total: 2,732
  - Density: 1,120/sq mi (432/km^{2})
- Time zone: UTC-6 (CST)
  - Summer (DST): UTC-5 (CDT)
- ZIP Code: 67063
- Area code: 620
- FIPS code: 20-32275
- GNIS ID: 485592
- Website: cityofhillsboro.net

Hillsboro is a city in Marion County, Kansas, United States. As of the 2020 census, the population of the city was 2,732. The city was named after John Hill, who homesteaded in the area in 1871. The city has a significant student population, because it is home of Tabor College.

== History ==
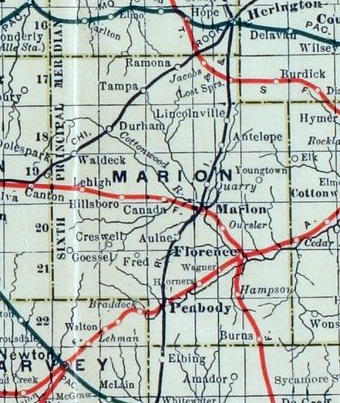
1915 railroad map of Marion County

=== Early history ===
For many millennia, the Great Plains of North America was inhabited by nomadic Native Americans. From the 16th century to 18th century, the Kingdom of France claimed ownership of large parts of North America. In 1762, after the French and Indian War, France secretly ceded New France to Spain, per the Treaty of Fontainebleau.

=== 19th century ===
In 1802, Spain returned most of the land to France. In 1803, most of the land for modern day Kansas was acquired by the United States from France as part of the 828,000 square mile Louisiana Purchase for 2.83 cents per acre.

In 1854, the Kansas Territory was organized, then in 1861 Kansas became the 34th U.S. state. In 1855, Marion County was established within the Kansas Territory, which included the land for modern day Hillsboro.

Hillsboro was named after John Gillespie Hill, who homesteaded in the area in 1871. Originally Hill City was the city name; since another city in Kansas already bore that name, it was changed to Hillsboro on June 20, 1879. A post office was established in Risley on April 10, 1873, then moved to Hillsboro on August 29, 1879.

As early as 1875, city leaders of Marion held a meeting to consider a branch railroad from Florence. In 1878, Atchison, Topeka and Santa Fe Railway and parties from Marion and McPherson counties chartered the Marion and McPherson Railway Company. In 1879, a branch line was built from Florence to McPherson; in 1880 it was extended to Lyons and in 1881 was extended to Ellinwood. The line was leased and operated by the Atchison, Topeka and Santa Fe Railway. The line from Florence to Marion was abandoned in 1968. In 1992, the line from Marion to McPherson was sold to Central Kansas Railway. In 1993, after heavy flood damage, the line from Marion through Hillsboro to McPherson was abandoned and removed. The original branch line connected Florence, Marion, Canada, Hillsboro, Lehigh, Canton, Galva, McPherson, Conway, Windom, Little River, Mitchell, Lyons, Chase and Ellinwood.

=== 20th century ===
In 1908, Tabor College was founded by members of the Mennonite Brethren and Krimmer Mennonite Brethren Christian churches.

The National Old Trails Road, also known as the Ocean-to-Ocean Highway, was established in 1912, and was routed through Lehigh, Hillsboro, Marion and Lost Springs.

== Geography ==
Hillsboro is located in the Flint Hills and Great Plains of the state of Kansas. According to the United States Census Bureau, the city has a total area of 2.57 square miles (6.66 km^{2}), of which 2.56 square miles (6.63 km^{2}) is land and 0.01 square miles (0.03 km^{2}) is water.

=== Climate ===
The climate in this area is characterized by hot, humid summers and generally mild to cool winters. According to the Köppen Climate Classification system, Hillsboro has a humid subtropical climate, abbreviated "Cfa" on climate maps.

== Area events ==
- Hillsboro Arts & Crafts Fair
- Hillsboro Farmer's Market
- Marion County Fair
- Annual Easter egg hunt

== Area attractions ==
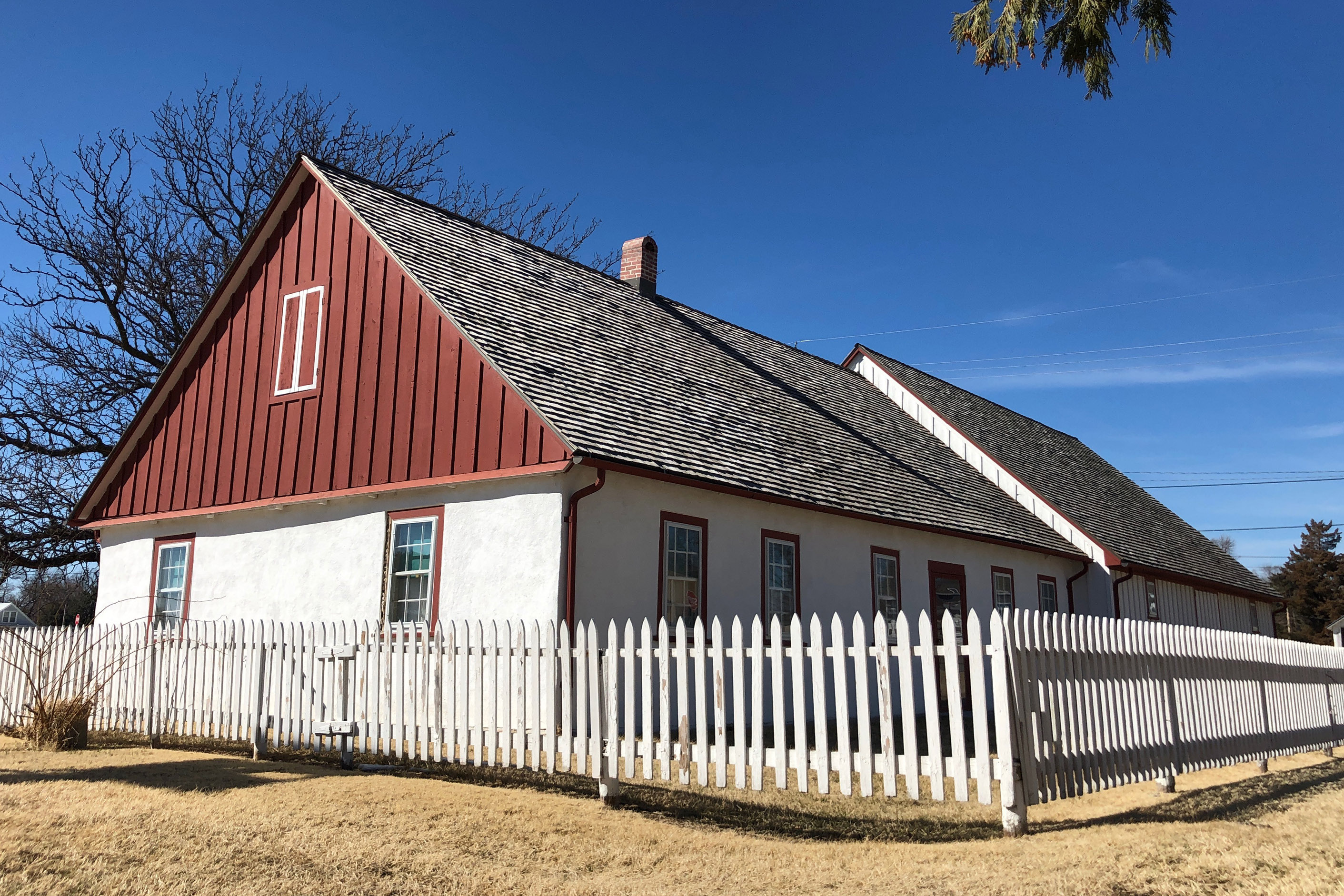
1876 P.P. Loewen House Museum (Pioneer Adobe House) (2022)

Hillsboro has two buildings listed on the National Register of Historic Places (NRHP).

- W.F. Schaeffler House Museum (NRHP), 312 East Grand Ave.
- Mennonite Settlement Museums, 501 South Ash Street. Main museum on Memorial Drive (one block west).
  - 1876 P.P. Loewen House (NRHP). Previously known as the Pioneer Adobe House. A traditional Russian clay brick house from the Mennonite settlement village of Hoffnungsthal. The last remaining house of its kind in North America.
  - Jacob Friesen Flouring Wind Mill is a detailed replica of the 1876 mill that stood in the Mennonite settlement village of Gnadenau.
  - 1886 Kreutziger School No. 97 was in service from 1886 to 1960, approximately five miles north of Canada.
- Marion Reservoir, north-east of Hillsboro, exits closest to farther from Hillsboro along US-56: French Creek cove (Limestone Road), Hillsboro cove (Nighthawk Road), Overlook and Dam (Old Mill Road), Marion cove and Cottonwood Point cove (Pawnee Road).

== Demographics ==
Historical population
Census	Pop.	Note	%±
1880	133		—
1890	555		317.3%
1900	754		35.9%
1910	1,134		50.4%
1920	1,451		28.0%
1930	1,458		0.5%
1940	1,580		8.4%
1950	2,150		36.1%
1960	2,441		13.5%
1970	2,730		11.8%
1980	2,717		−0.5%
1990	2,704		−0.5%
2000	2,854		5.5%
2010	2,993		4.9%
2020	2,732		−8.7%
U.S. Decennial Census

=== 2020 census ===
As of the 2020 census, Hillsboro had a population of 2,732, with 1,003 households and 625 families. The population density was 1,119.7 per square mile (432.3/km^{2}). There were 1,188 housing units at an average density of 486.9 per square mile (188.0/km^{2}).

The median age was 35.6 years. 20.9% of residents were under the age of 18, 19.5% were from 18 to 24, 18.2% were from 25 to 44, 21.6% were from 45 to 64, and 19.8% were 65 years of age or older. For every 100 females there were 100.1 males, and for every 100 females age 18 and over there were 98.4 males age 18 and over.

Of the 1,003 households, 26.2% had children under the age of 18 living in them. Of all households, 51.1% were married-couple households, 19.0% were households with a male householder and no spouse or partner present, and 25.7% were households with a female householder and no spouse or partner present. About 33.3% of all households were made up of individuals and 15.1% had someone living alone who was 65 years of age or older.

Of the 1,188 housing units, 15.6% were vacant. The homeowner vacancy rate was 4.6% and the rental vacancy rate was 18.4%.

0.0% of residents lived in urban areas, while 100.0% lived in rural areas.

Non-Hispanic White residents made up 85.69% of the population.

Racial composition as of the 2020 census
Race	Number	Percent
White	2,389	87.4%
Hispanic or Latino (of any race)	153	5.6%
Two or more races	114	4.2%
Some other race	103	3.8%
Black or African American	88	3.2%
Asian	21	0.8%
American Indian and Alaska Native	16	0.6%
Native Hawaiian and Other Pacific Islander	1	0.0%

=== Demographic estimates ===
The 2016–2020 5-year American Community Survey estimates show that the average household size was 2.0 and the average family size was 2.6. The percent of those with a bachelor's degree or higher was estimated to be 20.1% of the population.

=== Income and poverty ===
The 2016–2020 5-year American Community Survey estimates show that the median household income was $46,579 (with a margin of error of +/- $4,015) and the median family income was $68,056 (+/- $9,675). Males had a median income of $26,250 (+/- $4,647) versus $9,561 (+/- $2,623) for females. The median income for those above 16 years old was $20,769 (+/- $4,929). Approximately, 4.5% of families and 9.9% of the population were below the poverty line, including 3.2% of those under the age of 18 and 8.4% of those ages 65 or over.

=== 2010 census ===
As of the census of 2010, there were 2,993 people, 1,071 households, and 684 families residing in the city. The population density was 1,169.1 inhabitants per square mile (451.4/km^{2}). There were 1,193 housing units at an average density of 466.0 per square mile (179.9/km^{2}). The racial makeup of the city was 94.6% White, 1.7% African American, 0.3% Native American, 0.2% Asian, 0.1% Pacific Islander, 0.9% from other races, and 2.1% from two or more races. Hispanic or Latino of any race were 3.2% of the population.

There were 1,071 households, of which 28.7% had children under the age of 18 living with them, 54.6% were married couples living together, 6.3% had a female householder with no husband present, 3.0% had a male householder with no wife present, and 36.1% were non-families. 31.8% of all households were made up of individuals, and 15.8% had someone living alone who was 65 years of age or older. The average household size was 2.31 and the average family size was 2.86.

The median age in the city was 36.2 years. 19.8% of residents were under the age of 18; 20.2% were between the ages of 18 and 24; 17.7% were from 25 to 44; 21.5% were from 45 to 64; and 20.8% were 65 years of age or older. The gender makeup of the city was 48.7% male and 51.3% female.

== Economy ==
The largest employers in Hillsboro are education related, Tabor College and Unified School District 410, which have been in the community for over 100 years. Manufacturer Hillsboro Industries started business in 1968. There is also employment found in the agricultural sector, with Circle D Manufacturing, Hillsboro Industries, Ag Service, Cooperative Grain and Supply, and Country Side Feed.

== Government ==
The Hillsboro government consists of a mayor and four council members. The council meets the first and third Tuesdays of each month at 4PM.

- City Hall, 118 E Grand Ave.

== Education ==
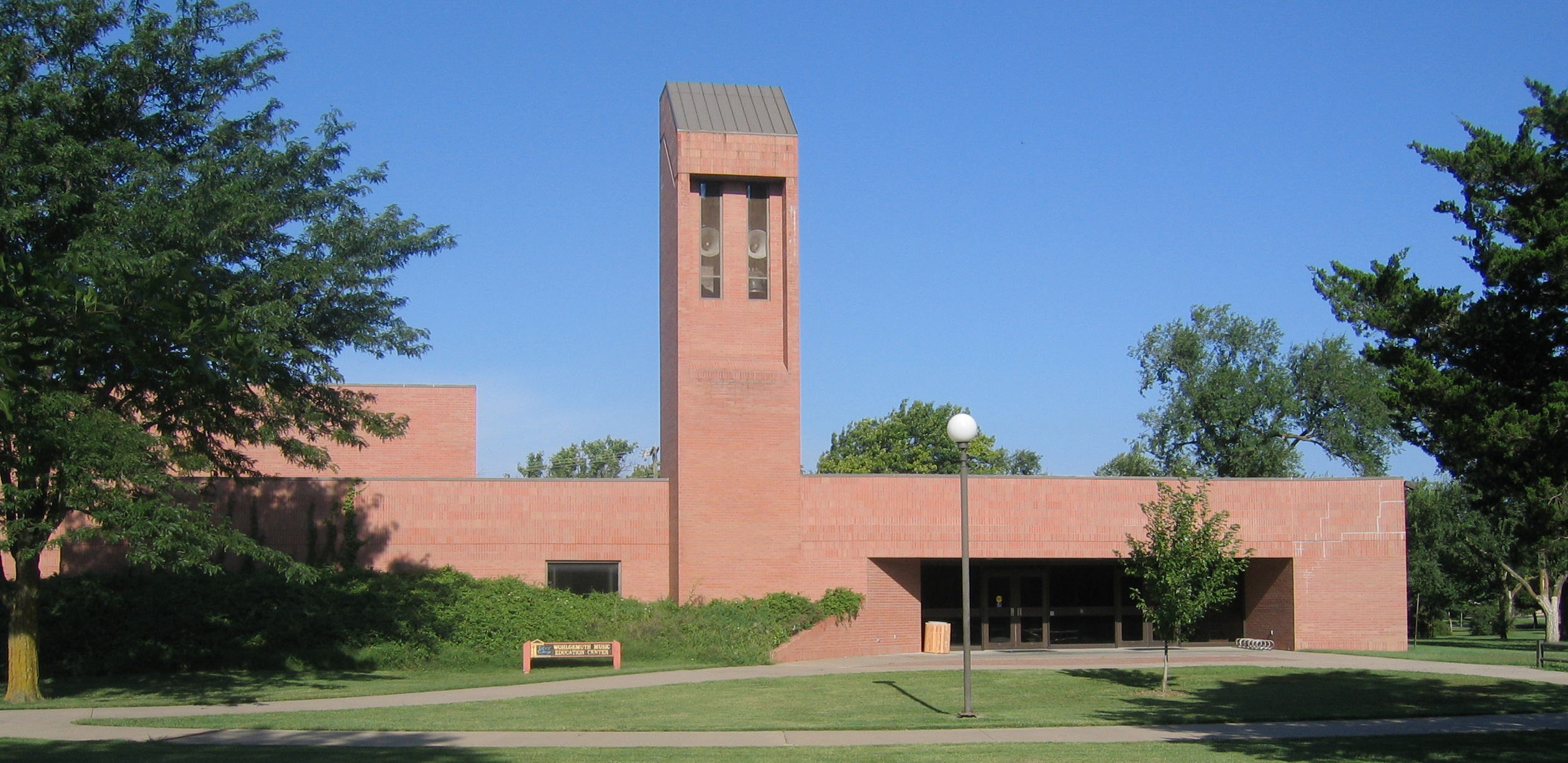
Wohlgemuth Music Education Center on Tabor College campus (2007)

=== College ===
Tabor College, a private college affiliated with the Mennonite Brethren Church, is located in Hillsboro at 400 South Jefferson Street. In 2009, Tabor College built a new football complex that is shared with Hillsboro High School.

=== Public schools ===
The community is served by Hillsboro USD 410 public school district. The high school is a member of T.E.E.N., a shared video teaching network between five area high schools.

- Hillsboro High School
- Hillsboro Middle School
- Hillsboro Elementary School

==== Sports ====
The Hillsboro High School mascot is a Trojan. All high school athletic and non-athletic competition is overseen by the Kansas State High School Activities Association. For 2010/2011 seasons, the football team competes as Class 3A.

Past Championships:

- The Hillsboro High School girls basketball team won the 3A Kansas State Basketball tournament in 2007 for the first time since 1996.
- The Hillsboro High School boys basketball team won back-to-back 2A Kansas State Basketball tournaments in 2021 and 2022.

=== Private schools ===
- Hope Valley Christian School, Private Grade School, 1808 Holly Rd, approximately 0.5 mile southwest of Hillsboro.

=== Library ===
Each USD 410 school has a library for student access.

Students of Tabor College have access to the Tabor College Library at 400 South Jefferson Street.

The city is served by the Hillsboro Public Library at 120 East Grand Avenue. The library is a member of the North Central Kansas Libraries System.

== Media ==
=== Print ===
The community is served by two weekly newspapers, the Hillsboro Free Press. and the Hillsboro Star-Journal. The Star-Journal is Hillsboro's oldest publication and the city's official newspaper, with the city's largest paid circulation. The Free Press is distributed free by carrier to residences in the city, and covers news for the greater Marion County area.

The Wichita Eagle in Wichita delivers to Marion County on Sundays and Thanksgiving. The Salina Journal from Salina offers daily delivery yeararound.

=== Radio ===
Hillsboro is served by numerous radio stations of the Wichita-Hutchinson listening market area, and satellite radio. See Media in Wichita, Kansas.

=== Television ===
Hillsboro is served by over-the-air ATSC digital TV of the Wichita-Hutchinson viewing market area, cable TV, and satellite TV. See Media in Wichita, Kansas.

== Infrastructure ==
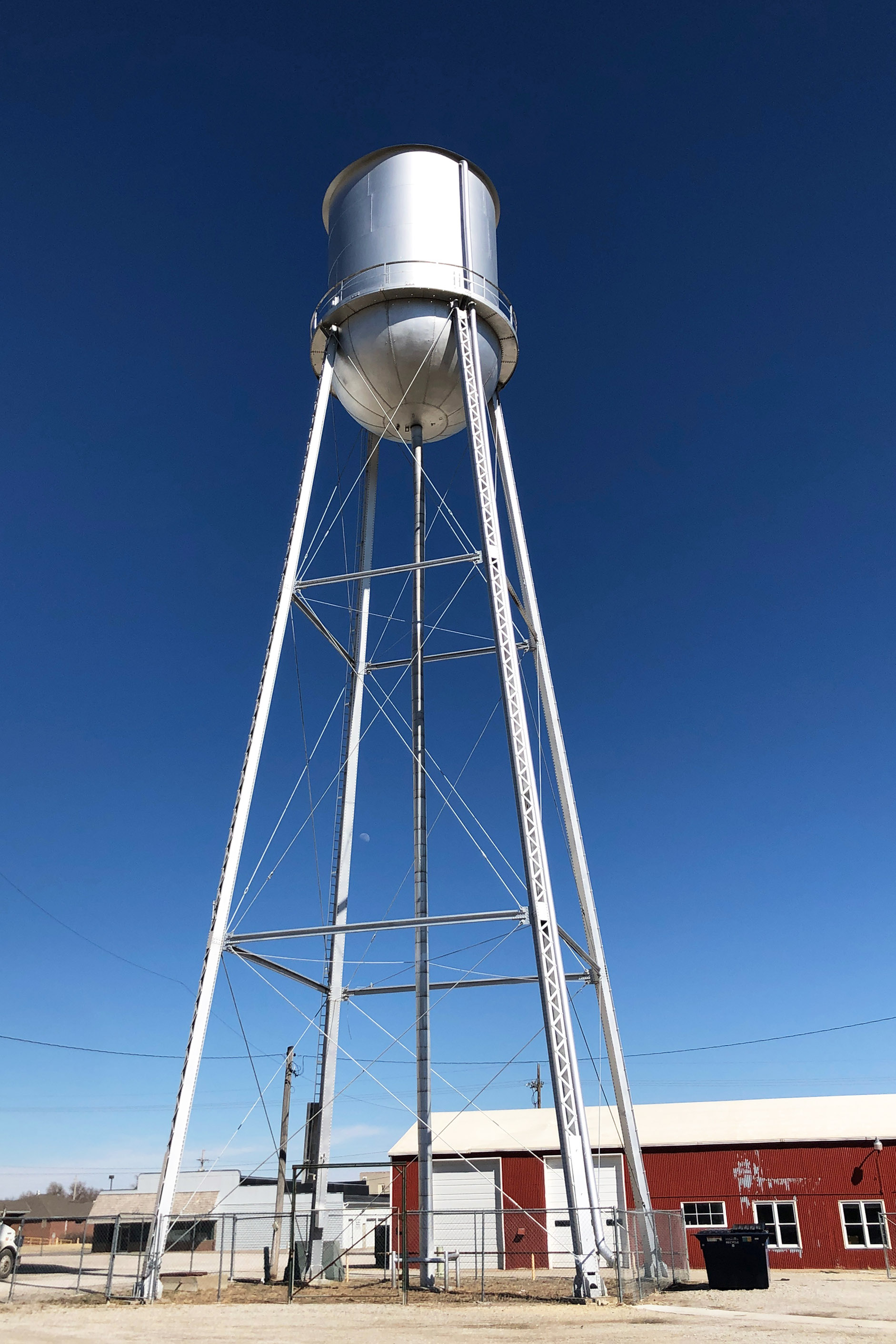
1927 Hillsboro Water Tower

=== Transportation ===
US-56 highway runs east–west along the northern side of the city, and K-15 highway is 0.5 miles (0.80 km) northwest of the city.

Alfred Schroeder Field airport, FAA:M66, is located immediately adjacent to the west of the fair grounds.

=== Utilities ===
- Internet
  - Fiber is provided by TCW.
  - DSL is provided by CenturyLink.
  - Cable is provided by Eagle Communications.
  - Wireless is provided by Pixius Communications, Rise Broadband.
  - Satellite is provided by HughesNet, StarBand, WildBlue.
- TV
  - Cable is provided by Eagle Communications.
  - Satellite is provided by DirecTV, Dish Network.
  - Terrestrial is provided by regional digital TV stations.
- Electricity
  - City is provided by Kansas Power Pool, billed by City of Hillsboro.
  - Rural is provided by Flint Hills RECA.
- Gas is provided by Atmos Energy.
- Water
  - City is provided by City of Hillsboro.
  - Rural is provided by Marion County RWD #4 (map).
- Sewer
  - Service is provided by City of Hillsboro.
- Trash
  - Service is provided by City of Hillsboro.

== Notable people ==
- Donald Dahl (1945-2014), Kansas House of Representatives from 1997 to 2008, U.S. Navy
- J. V. Friesen, Kansas House of Representatives in 1941, furniture dealer
- William Kopper, Kansas House of Representatives in 1935, merchant
- Theodore Schellenberg (1903-1970), archivist and archival theorist.

== See also ==
- Hillsboro High School
- Tabor College and Tabor Bluejays
- Joel Wiens Stadium
- National Register of Historic Places listings in Marion County, Kansas
- Historical Maps of Marion County, Kansas
- Miss Kansas, 1969
- National Old Trails Road
- Threshing Stone
- Gnadenau, Kansas
