= Kern Medical Center =

Kern Medical

Geography
- Location: 1700 Mount Vernon Avenue Bakersfield, CA 93306, Bakersfield, California, United States
- Coordinates: 35.38247°N 118.96975°W

Organization
- Type: Teaching
- Affiliated university: University of California, Los Angeles

Services
- Emergency department: Level II trauma center

Links
- Lists: Hospitals in California

Kern Medical is a public hospital and teaching hospital in Bakersfield, California. The hospital has 222 beds and is operated by the Kern County Hospital Authority.

Kern Medical was established in 1867 and has operated under several names during its history, including Kern County Hospital and Kern Medical Center. In addition to its main hospital campus, the organization operates outpatient clinics in Kern County.

The hospital operates a Level II trauma center and provides graduate medical education through residency and fellowship programs. Kern Medical is affiliated with the David Geffen School of Medicine at UCLA and serves as a clinical training site for medical students and physicians.

Kern Medical provides inpatient, outpatient, emergency, trauma, surgical, and specialty medical services. As a public hospital, it also serves as a safety-net healthcare provider for Kern County.

== Notable staff ==
- Selma Calmes, co-founder of the Anesthesia History Association, former chair of the department of anesthesiology.
- Hans Einstein
