= Tabor College (Kansas) =

Mennonite college in Hillsboro, Kansas, US

- Type: Private college
- Established: 1908; 118 years ago
- Religious affiliation: U.S. Conference of Mennonite Brethren Churches
- President: David S. Janzen
- Academic staff: 140
- Students: 742 (2025)
- Location: Hillsboro, Kansas, United States; 38°20′55″N 97°11′59″W
- Campus: Rural, 220 acres (89 ha)
- Colors: Blue and gold
- Nickname: Bluejays
- Sporting affiliations: NAIA – KCAC
- Website: tabor.edu

Tabor College is a private Mennonite college in Hillsboro, Kansas, United States. It is owned and operated by four districts of the U.S. Conference of Mennonite Brethren Churches and describes its theological identity as Evangelical/Anabaptist. There were 742 students enrolled across all programs for the fall 2025 semester, with 567 students attending at the main Hillsboro campus.

== History ==
In 1908, members of Mennonite Brethren and Krimmer Mennonite Brethren Christian churches founded Tabor College. Tabor held classes for the first time on Sept. 14 of that year. The college’s earliest academic focus was business, science, education, and Christian ministry.

The college faced possible closing after a fire on April 30, 1918. Two years to the day, the college officially opened the H.W. Lohrenz Administration Building and the Mary J. Regier. Both buildings still stand on campus.

In the late 1950s, a major structural expansion began. It included, but was not limited to: a new library and gymnasium and the opening of three new men’s (California, Nebraska, and Oklahoma) and four new women’s (Ediger, Regier, East, and West) residence halls. New residence halls include the Townhouses, Harms Hall, and Jost Hall.

The Solomon L. Loewen Natural Science Center opened in the late 1990s, and after the Wohlgemuth Music Education Center gave the arts a home in 1983, a sizable expansion opened in 2017 with the addition of the Shari Flaming Center for the Arts. The Shari Flaming Welcome Center opened in 2020 and the Shari Flaming Education Commons in 2021.

Athletic facilities include Joel H. Wiens Stadium, Pendery Athletic Center, Campus Recreation Center, Gymnasium, baseball and softball fields, indoor tennis facility and practice fields.

After opening a second campus, Tabor College Wichita, in January 1994, it relocated to the Hillsboro campus in 2019, where it integrated the classes and staff for its online and residential programming.

From its start in 1908, Tabor has operated with a Christian focus, including its mission statement, “preparing people for a life of learning, work, and service for Christ and His kingdom.”

== Campus ==
Tabor's main campus is situated in Hillsboro, Kansas, located approximately 50 miles north of Wichita, Kansas. It is home to the Carson Center for Global Engagement, the Center for Mennonite Brethren Studies, and the Central Kansas Entrepreneurship Center. Campus includes six main residence halls and at least 12 additional housing units, and at least 13 separate facilities including a welcome center, cafeteria, center for the arts, historic church, library, recreation center, and athletic facilities. There are designated fields or courts for baseball, basketball, football, and tennis.

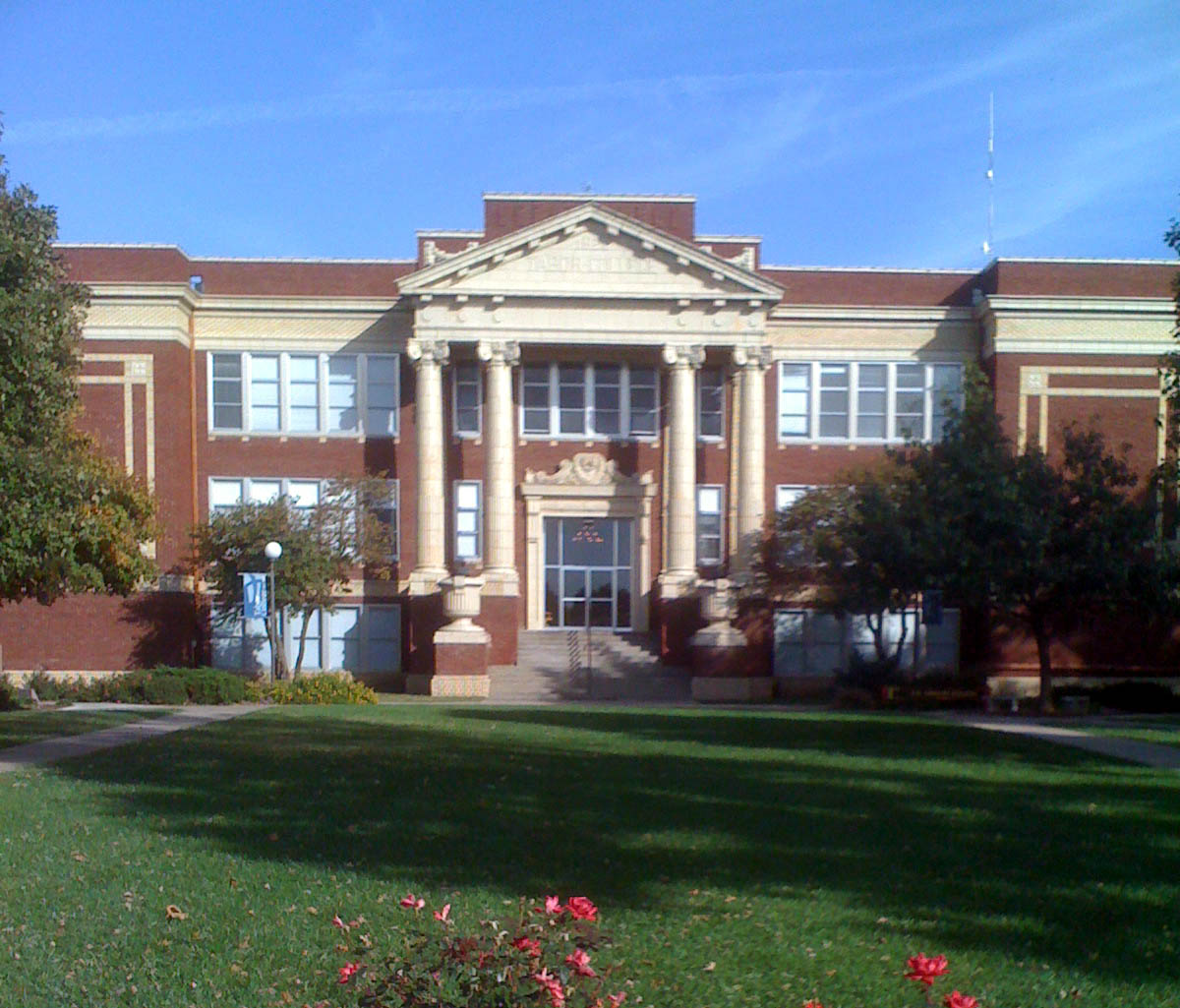
Administration building

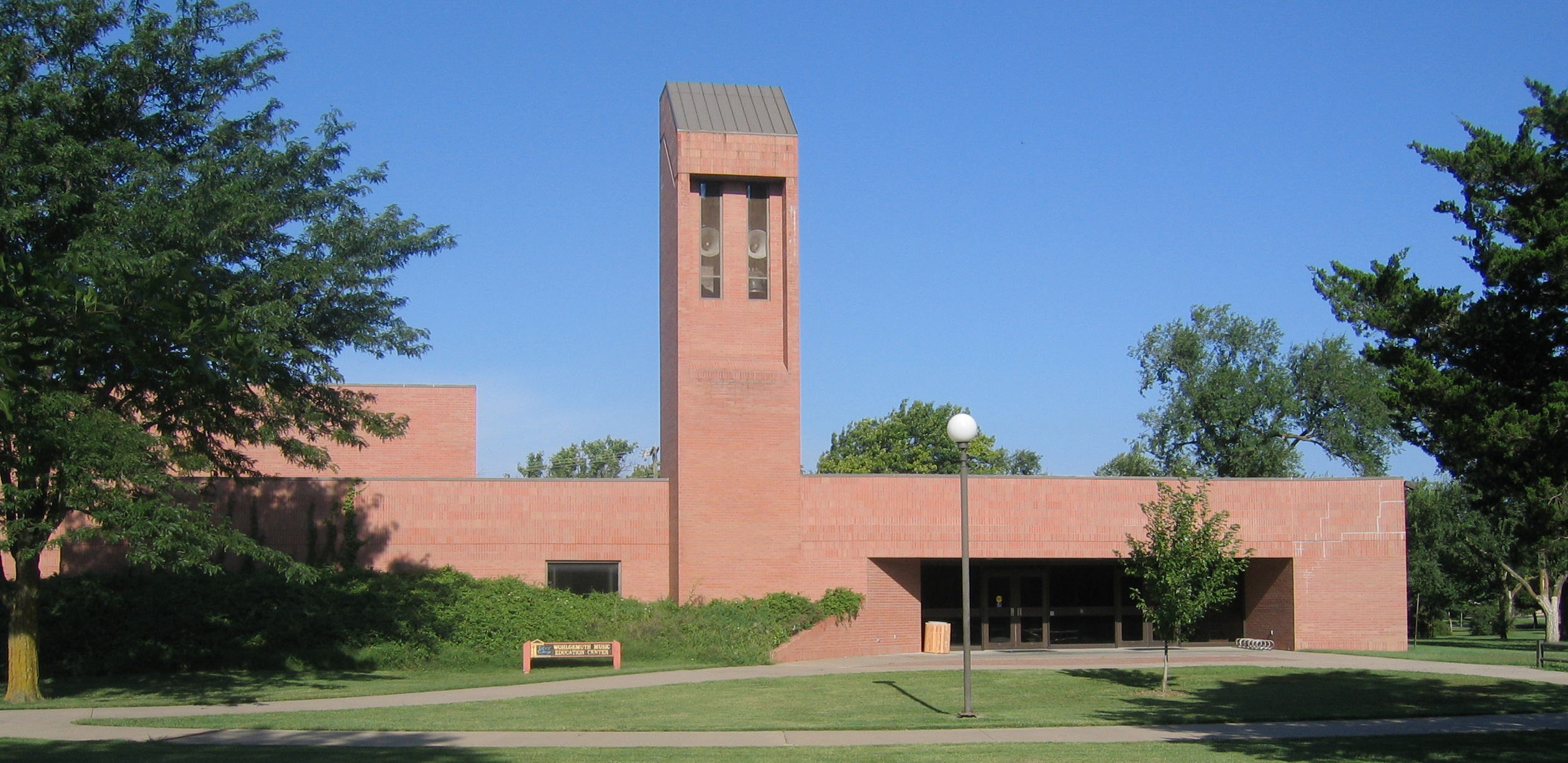
Wohlgemuth Music Education Center

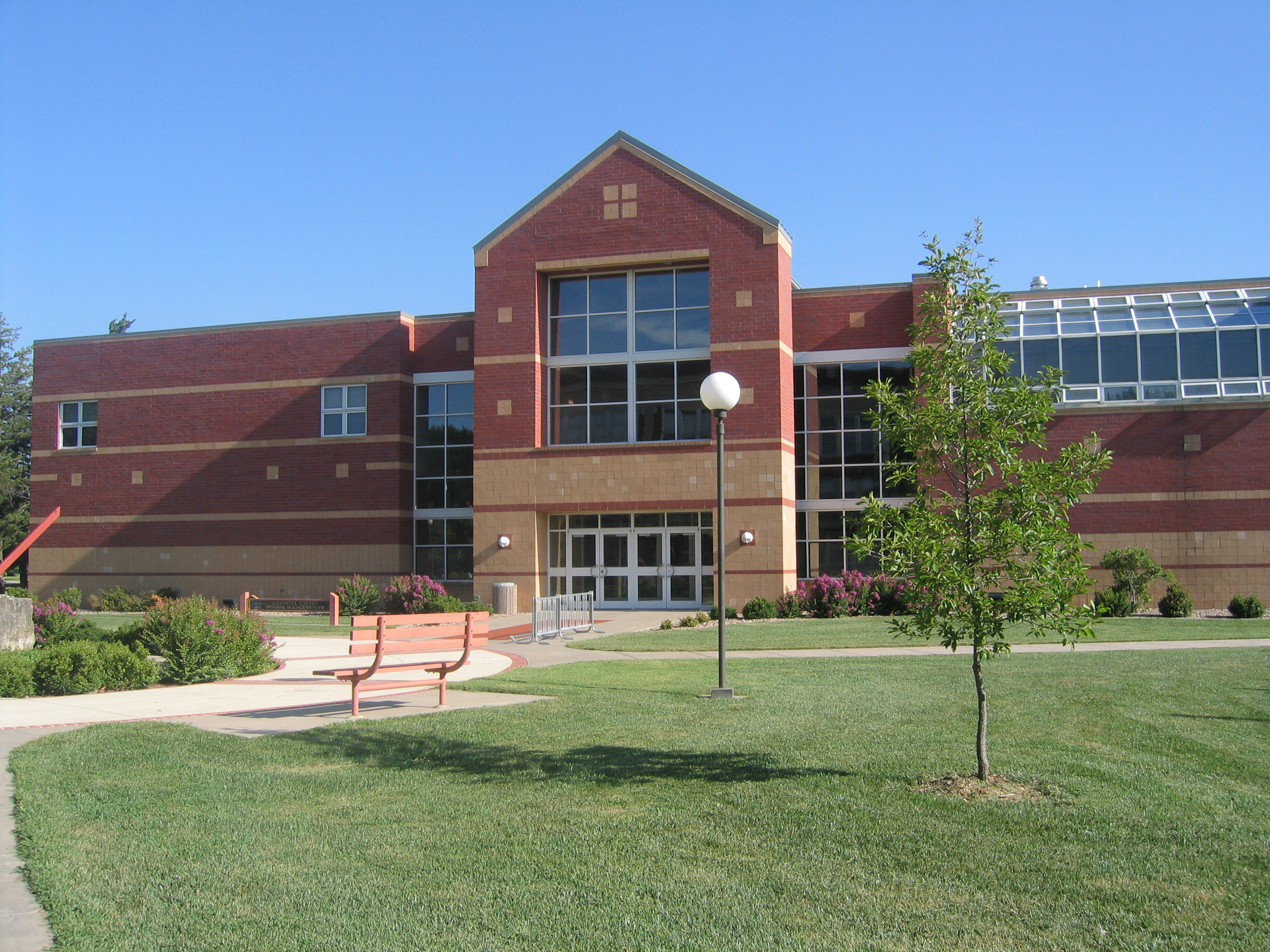
Natural Science Center

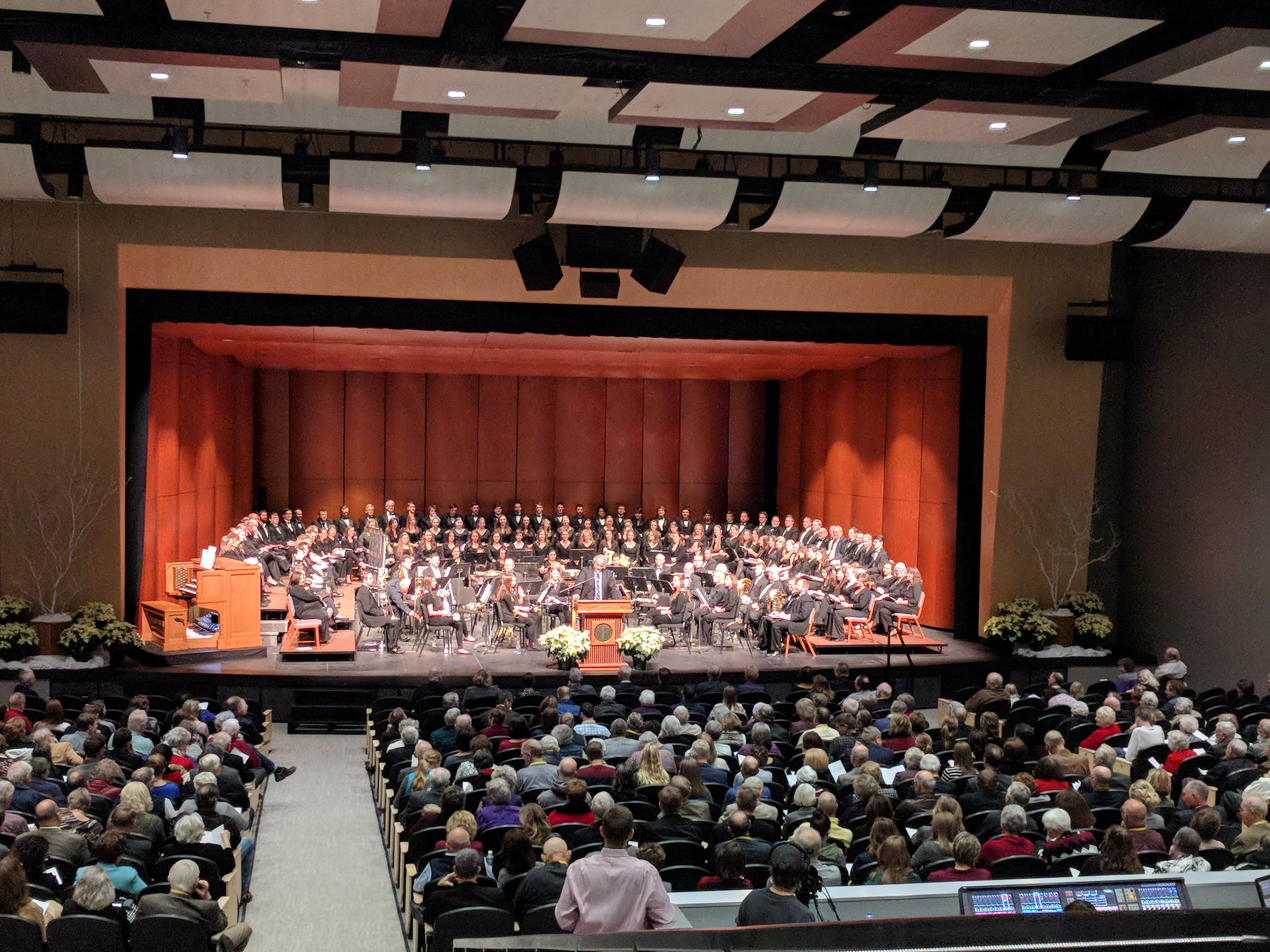
A 2017 performance of Handel's Messiah at the Shari Flaming Center for the Arts.

== Organization and administration ==
Tabor College is owned and operated by the US Mennonite Brethren Church. Tabor's Board of Directors is responsible to the Central, Southern, Latin America (South Texas), and Eastern Districts, but not the Pacific District, which gives governance to Fresno Pacific University. The president of the college is appointed by the Board of Directors.

== Athletics ==
Tabor College’s mascot is the Bluejay, believed to have been chosen by the college’s first yearbook editor, Renetta Schulz Friesen.

Its 16 varsity sports (and co-ed cheerleading) have competed in the Kansas Collegiate Athletic Conference (KCAC) since 1968-69. It is also a National Association of Intercollegiate Athletics (NAIA) member.

Varsity sports include baseball, football, softball, volleyball, men’s and women’s basketball, men’s and women’s cross country, men’s and women’s golf, men’s and women’s soccer, men’s and women’s tennis, and men’s and women’s indoor/outdoor track & field.

== Notable people ==
- Kelly Arnold – politician
- Donald Dahl – politician
- Paul Folmsbee – U.S. Ambassador to Mali under President Barack Obama and Donald Trump
- Bob Glanzer – politician
- Rolland Lawrence – professional football player
- Lane Lord – college basketball coach
- Theodore Schellenberg – archivist and archival theorist
- Martha Wall – Christian medical missionary
- Jacob Webb – professional baseball player
- Roger Wollman – judge

== See also ==
- List of colleges and universities in the United States
- Joel Wiens Stadium
