= List of Bethany Swedes head football coaches =

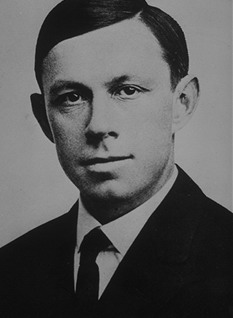
Hall of Fame coach Bennie Owen got his start at Bethany from 1902 to 1904. His teams accumulated a record of 22 wins, 6 losses, and 2 ties.

The Bethany Swedes football program (historically known as the "Terrible Swedes") is a college football team that represents Bethany College in the Kansas Collegiate Athletic Conference, a part of the NAIA.

The current head coach is Curran White who took over for the 2019 season. White replaced Paul Hubbard who took the position after the conclusion of the 2014 season and the departure of Manny Matsakis. Matsakis was hired in March 2013 to replace Jamie Cruce who first took the position for the 2006 season and resigned after completion of the 2012 season.

The two most successful coaches in terms of winning percentage are Bennie Owen and Ted Kessinger, both who have been inducted into the College Football Hall of Fame.

== Key ==
Key to symbols in coaches list
General		Overall		Conference		Postseason (Note: Although the first Rose Bowl Game was played in 1902, it has been continuously played since the 1916 game, and is recognized as the oldest bowl game by the NCAA. "—" indicates any season prior to 1916 when postseason games were not played.)	
No.	Order of coaches (Note: A running total of the number of head coaches, with coaches who served separate tenures being counted only once. Interim head coaches are represented with "Int" and are not counted in the running total. "—" indicates the team played but either without a coach or no coach is on record. "X" indicates an interim year without play.)	GC	Games coached	CW	Conference wins	PW	Postseason wins
DC	Division championships	OW	Overall wins	CL	Conference losses	PL	Postseason losses
CC	Conference championships	OL	Overall losses	CT	Conference ties	PT	Postseason ties
NC	National championships	OT	Overall ties (Note: Overtime rules in college football were introduced in 1996, making ties impossible in the period since.)	C%	Conference winning percentage		
†	Elected to the College Football Hall of Fame	O%	Overall winning percentage (Note: When computing the win–loss percentage, a tie counts as half a win and half a loss.)				

== Coaches ==
Statistics correct as of the end of the 2025 college football season.

No.	Name	Term	GC	OW	OL	OT	O%	CW	CL	CT	C%	PW	PL	CCs	NCs	Awards
1	A. W. Kjellstrand	1893–1894	4	2	2	0	.500	—	—	—		—	—	—	—	
X	no team	1895–1900	0	0	0	0	–	—	—	—		—	—	—	—	
X	Unknown	1901	8	5	2	1	.688	—	—	—		—	—	—	—	
2	Bennie Owen^{†}	1902–1904	3	22	6	2	.767	—	—	—		—	—	—	—	College Football Hall of Fame (1951)
X	no team	1905–1914	0	0	0	0	–	—	—	—		—	—	—	—	
3	Edgar O. Brown	1915–1916	15	3	11	1	.233	—	—	—		—	—	—	—	
4	W. F. Banbury	1917–1919	22	5	15	2	.273	—	—	—		—	—	—	—	
5	Guy C. Omer	1920–1921	17	10	6	1	.618	—	—	—		—	—	—	—	
6	Adrian Lindsey	1922–1926	41	24	15	2	.610	—	—	—		—	—	1	—	
7	George Carlson	1927–1933	56	21	29	6	.429	—	—	—		—	—	—	—	
8	Elmer Schaake	1934–1937	34	13	19	2	.412	—	—	—		—	—	—	—	Kansas Sports Hall of Fame (1972)
9	Ray D. Hahn	1938–1942; 1946–1956	136	55	77	4	.419	—	—	—		—	—	1	—	
X	no team	1943–1945	0	0	0	0	–	—	—	—		—	—	—	—	
10	Hal Collins	1957–1960	34	11	20	3	.368	—	—	—		—	—	—	—	
11	Phil Miller	1961–1964	36	16	18	2	.472	—	—	—		—	—	—	—	
12	Keith Rasmussen	1965–1973	84	43	38	3	.530	—	—	—		1	1	1	—	
13	Van Hollaway	1974–1975	20	7	13	0	.350	—	—	—		—	—	—	—	
14	Ted Kessinger^{†}	1976–2003	277	219	57	1	.792	198	40	1	.831	4	11	16	—	Kansas Sports Hall of Fame (2005); NAIA Hall of Fame (2003); College Football Hall of Fame (2010); KCAC Coach of the Year (11 times)
15	Tony Johnson	2004–2006	29	7	22	0	.241	7	20	0	.259	—	—	—	—	
16	Jamie Cruce	2007–2012	62	28	34	0	.452	22	33	0	.411	—	—	—	—	
17	Manny Matsakis	2013–2014	22	8	14	0	.364	6	12	0	.333	—	—	—		
18	Paul Hubbard	2015–2018	43	11	32	0	.256	10	27	0	.270	—	—	—	—	
19	Curran White	2019	10	4	6	0	.400	4	6	0	.400	—	—	—	—	
20	Tyrone Carter	2020–2022	25	1	24	0	.040	0	20	0	.000	—	—	—	—	
21	Mike Grossner	2023–present	33	7	26	0	.212	1	14	0	.067	—	—	—	—	

== See also ==
- List of Kansas Collegiate Athletic Conference people
- List of people from McPherson County, Kansas
