= List of people from McPherson County, Kansas =

The following is a list of people from McPherson County, Kansas. Inclusion on the list should be reserved for notable people past and present who have resided in the county, either in cities or rural areas.

== Academic ==
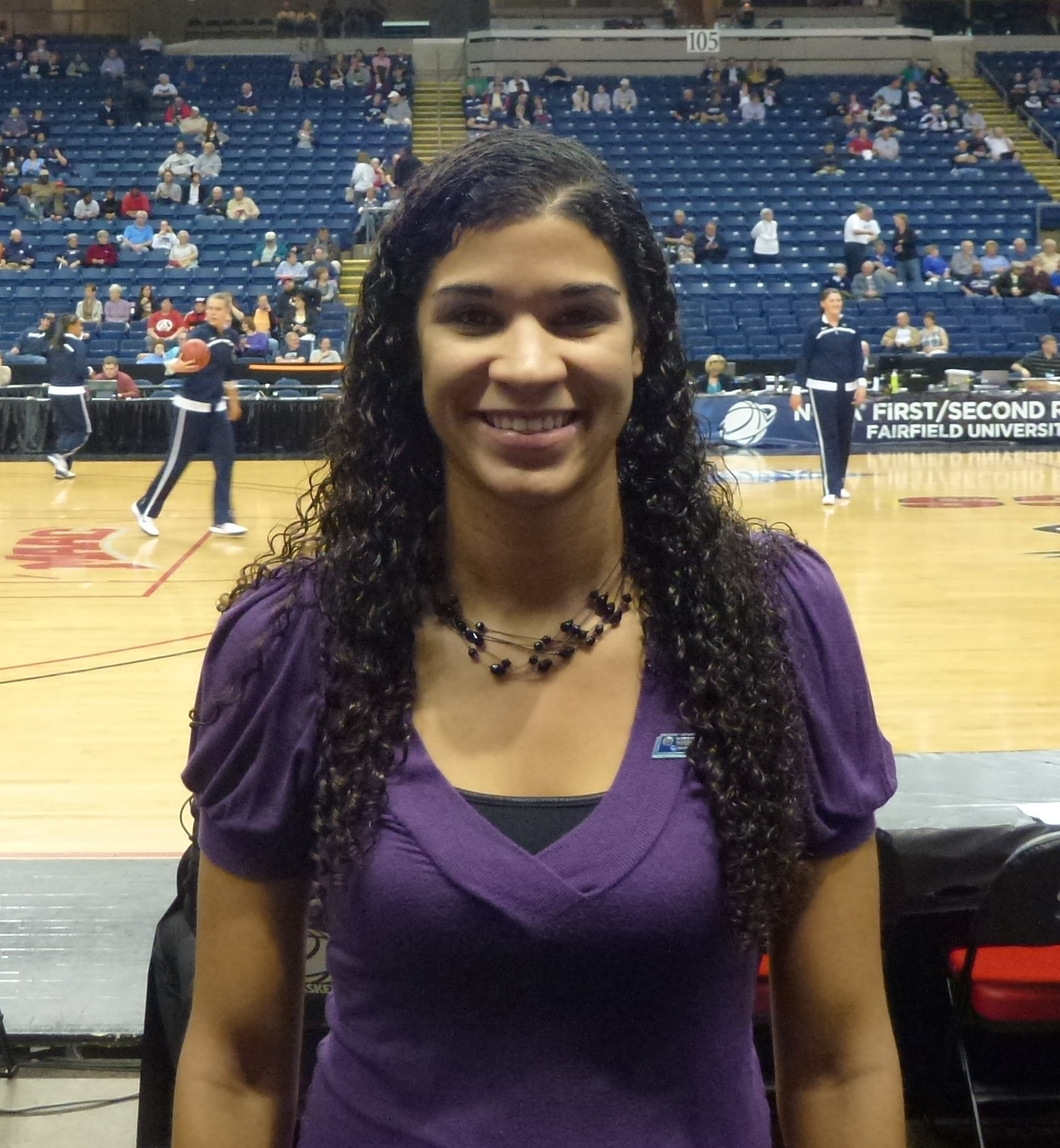
Marlies Gipson went from playing basketball at McPherson High School to the Kansas State Wildcats, and was later in the WNBA.

- John Frykman, Lutheran minister and psychotherapist specializing in brief therapy
- Wendell Johnson, psychologist, actor and author; was a proponent of General Semantics
- Stanford Lehmberg, historian
- Emory Lindquist, president of Bethany College and Wichita State University
- Harvey Harlow Nininger, meteorite collector, self-taught meteorologist, educator; considered by many today to be the "father of modern meteoritics"
- David Nyvall, Swedish immigrant to the United States and church leader; helped shape the Evangelical Covenant Church and establish North Park University in Chicago

== Arts ==
- Chris Arpad, solo steel pannist, entertainer, musician, Scottish Highland drummer
- Bruce Conner, artist of multiple mediums
- Harrison Keller, violinist and music educator
- Robert Leaf, composer
- Bruce Montgomery, entertainer
- John W. Peterson, composer
- John Pfeiffer, classical recording producer
- Birger Sandzen, artist
- Gordon Young, composer

== Crime ==
- Duane Earl Pope, convicted murderer

== Politics ==
- Jim Francisco, Kansas lieutenant governor
- Dick Nichols, US representative

== Sports ==
See also List of Bethany Terrible Swedes head football coaches and List of McPherson Bulldogs head football coaches

- Montee Ball, running back for the Denver Broncos
- Jonathan Coachman, sports commentator for ESPN
- Marlies Gipson, professional basketball player
- Kent Kessinger, college football head coach at Ottawa University
- Ted Kessinger, member of College Football Hall of Fame
- Laurie Koehn, professional basketball player
- Del Lundgren, major league baseball pitcher
- Taylor Robertson, professional basketball player
- Stewart Stover, linebacker for the Kansas City Chiefs
- Brad Underwood, college basketball head coach at Illinois

== Others ==
- Pop Hollinger, one of the first to begin collecting comic books for resale, went to college and played football at McPherson College

== See also ==
- Lists of people from Kansas
