= Carl Lotave =

Swedish artist

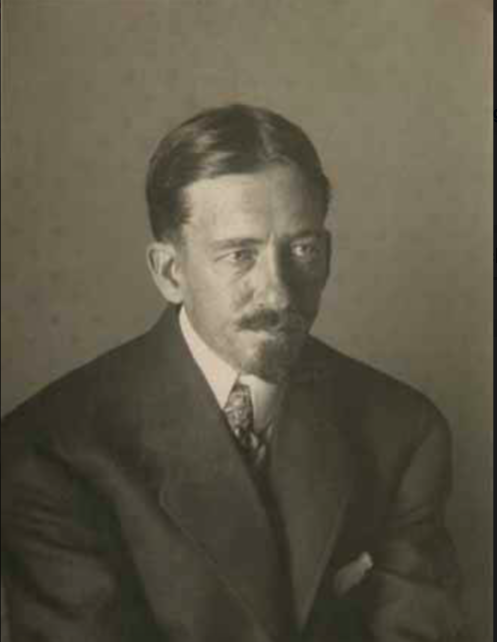
Jesse L. Nusbaum, Carl Lotave, ca. 1910, Palace of the Governors Photo Archives, New Mexico History Museum, Santa Fe

Carl Lotave (February 29, 1872 – December 27, 1924) was a painter of portraits, illustrator, and sculptor. He painted portraits of notable leaders of World War I and is best known for his two portraits of President Abraham Lincoln. Lotave was an art instructor at Bethany College in Kansas.

== Early life and education ==
Carl Theofil Gustafson-Lotave was born February 29, 1872, in Jönköping, Sweden. He was the son of the mechanic Carl Gustaf Gustafsson and Carolina Westergren. After completing schooling at Jönköping School of Education in 1889, he went to Stockholm in 1891.

He studied art under the Swedish artist Anders Zorn and Richard Bergh at the Artists' Association's newly opened school. (Note: It has also been called the Art School of the Artists' League.) Lotave met Birger Sandzén when they studied under Zorn. He then studied at Paris at the Académie Colarossi.

== Career ==
He established himself in Europe as a portrait painter and then he went to the United States in 1897 to teach at Bethany College, at the recommendation of Birger Sandzén. The college is located in the town of Lindsborg, Kansas, that was settled by Swedish people. He held the position from 1897 to 1899, when his friend Birger Sandzén took over the position. While in Kansas, he painted an altarpiece called Transfiguration at the Swedish Lutheran Church in Salemsborg, Kansas, about 1898. (Note: The church burned down in 1925, but someone first saved the work by Lotave.)

Sandzén, G.N. Malm, and Lotave organized the first exhibition of Swedish-American art. It became the annual Midwest Art Exhibition. His work, along with that of Birger Sandzén and G.N. Malm were shown at the Birger Sandzén Memorial Gallery during the 120th annual Midwest Art Exhibition in 2018.

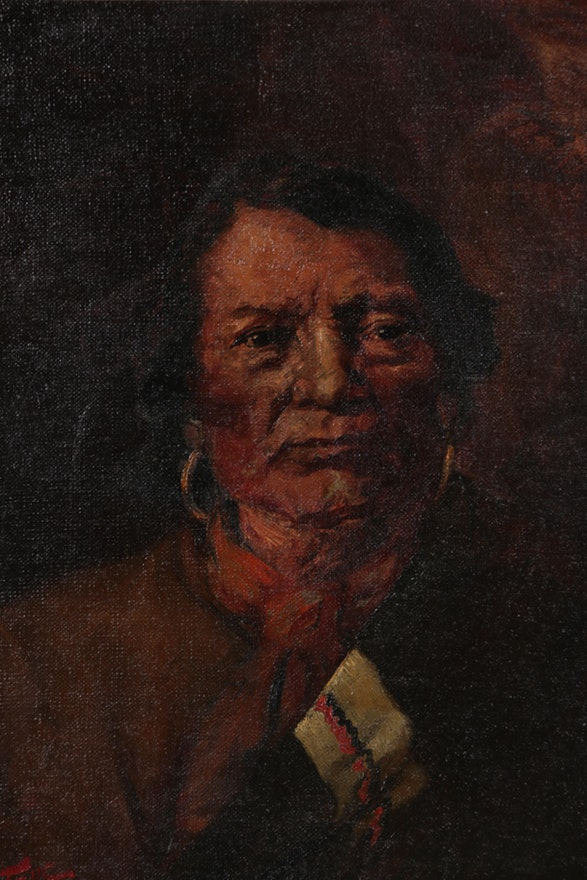
Carl Lotave, Chief Ignacio of the Ute people, 1905

Lotave moved to Colorado Springs, Colorado, in 1899 (Note: He is also said to have arrived in Colorado Springs in 1901) for inspiration for landscape paintings. He worked from 1897 to 1910 on commissions to paint Native Americans for the Smithsonian Institution. In 1905, he painted a portrait of Ignacio, chief of the Ute people.

He was among the faculty of the Colorado Art School by 1904 and he lived in Denver by 1909. He had started to make a name for himself as a portrait painter by that time. He painted portraits of society women in 1911 in New York City, followed by commissions for portraits on the Pacific Coast. He also sought women to model for him so that he could continue a series of paintings that he created called the Venus Inscrutable. According to journalist Nixola Greeley-Smith, he was found that the "Venus of today must have the three dimensions of beauty—beauty of soul, beauty of body, beauty of mind that would be reflected in her facial expressions.

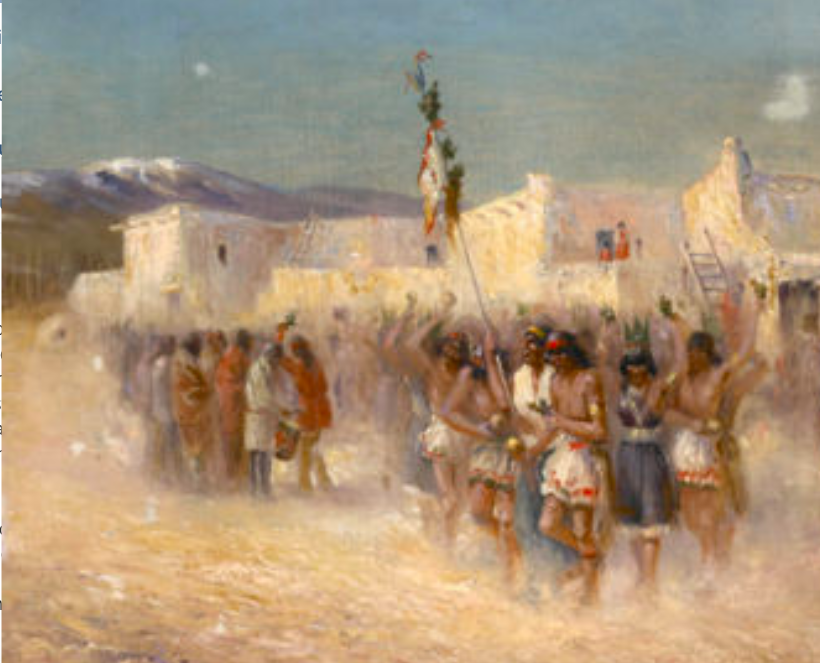
Hopi Dance Ceremony, Carl Lotave, 1910

He was a friend of New Mexican Governor Miguel A. Otero and painted murals for the New Mexico Palace of the Governors. The murals represented the early days of New Mexico when Ancestral Puebloans lived in villages. He painted Puye and Frijoles Canyon. He also created murals of the Santa Fe Wagon Train, Prehistoric Santa Fe, and Vargas Occupying the City. The murals were added as part of a renovation from 1909 to 1913. He painted a portrait of Governor Charles Bent, which was hung in the New Mexico state senate. He made portraits of notable people in Santa Fe, including Mrs. L. Bradford Prince.

After living in Santa Fe, Lotave lived for a time in Paris. He went to New York City after World War I to paint portraits of Americans who gained notoriety during the war. He was hired in 1917 to paint the portrait of General Joseph Joffre, "the hero of the Marne", when the French Commission came to New York. Over his career, he painted portraits of King Albert, Premier Eleftherios Venizelos, General John J. Pershing, and General Paul von Hindenburg. He painted two portraits of Abraham Lincoln; One called 1861 was painted by Lotave in 1898.

He illustrated the book Heroes of Troy by L. Boyd Evans and provided illustrations for magazines, including Success and Mountain Sunshine. He also made genre pictures, figures, landscapes, murals, and sculptures. A memorial exhibition with his art was displayed at the Craft and Industrial Exhibition in Jönköping in 1928. In Sweden, Lotave is represented at the Jönköping County Museum (Jönköpings läns museum). His works are in the collections of the New Mexico Museum of Art, Metropolitan Museum of Art, Colorado Springs Pioneers Museum, and the Birger Sandzen Memorial Gallery.

== Personal life ==
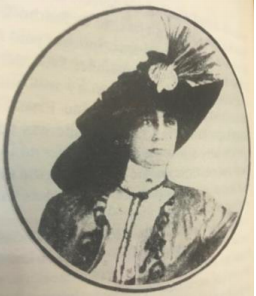
Janette Muir Lotave Springer

Lotave married Janette Elizabeth Muir when she was 17 or 18 years of age. Born in Edinburgh, Scotland, she was the niece of dean of the Glasgow Cathedral and the chaplain in ordinary to King George V, Rev. Dr. Pearson McAdam Muir. They lived in Denver and then in Santa Fe for several years while he made paintings for the Old Palace. He made a portrait of his wife, which is among the collection of the New Mexico Museum of Art. Due to a difference in temperaments, they divorced in 1909. Janette married family friend John W. Springer in June 1915 after a two-year courtship.

== Death ==
His health declined after World War I and he moved to New York City where he lived throughout his latter years. Lotave was seriously ill and underwent surgery on July 30, 1924. He required nursing care from the time of the operation. He wrote a note to his friends on Christmas Day that expressed how alone and hopeless he felt. He committed suicide on December 27, 1924, in New York City in his studio and it was found that he had cancer. He was 52 years old. His ashes were buried at the top of Pikes Peak in Colorado on June 4, 1925. A plaque bearing his name was erected at the summit. (Note: Lotave had approach Spencer Penrose, who owned the road to the top of Pikes Peak, with an idea for a cemetery at the summit of the mountain for famous writers, scientists and artists. He proposed that a building near Summit House could be built for memorial services. The cemetery was never built, but Lotave's ashes and the marker are there.)
