= George Carlson =

George Carlson may refer to:

- George Carlson (American football) (1897–1953), college football coach in the United States
- George Carlson (Canadian politician), municipal politician in Canada
- George Carlson (footballer) (1925–2006), Tranmere Rovers player
- George Alfred Carlson (1876–1926), governor of the U.S. state of Colorado
- George C. Carlson Jr. (fl. 2000s–2010s), associate justice of the Supreme Court of Mississippi
- George L. Carlson (1887–1962), American illustrator
