= Ernest House =

Ernest House may refer to:

- Ernest House Sr. (1945–2011), American tribal leader
- Ernest R. House (born 1937), American academic
