= Ray D. Hahn =

American football coach (1897–1989)

Biographical details
- Born: November 19, 1897; Clay Center, Kansas, U.S.
- Died: November 8, 1989 (aged 91); Lindsborg, Kansas, U.S.

Playing career

Football
- 1920–1922: Kansas State
- 1926: Hammond Pros

Basketball
- 1921–1923: Kansas State
- Position: Guard (football)

Coaching career (HC unless noted)

Football
- 1923: Norton HS (KS)
- 1924–1927: Downers Grove HS (IL)
- 1928: Chadron Normal (assistant)
- 1929–1934: South Dakota Mines
- 1938–1942: Bethany (KS)
- 1943–1945: Leavenworth HS (KS)
- 1946–1956: Bethany (KS)

Basketball
- 1928–1929: Chadron Normal
- 1930–1935: South Dakota Mines
- ?: Bethany (KS)

Administrative career (AD unless noted)
- 1938–1966: Bethany (KS)

Head coaching record
- Overall: 70–104–4 (college football); 40–49 (college basketball, excluding Bethany (KS))

Accomplishments and honors

Championships
- Football; 1 KCAC (1946) Basketball; 1 KCAC regular season (1941)

Awards
- Grantland Rice All-American team Kansas Sports Hall of Fame; NAIA Hall of Fame

Ray Dreyer Hahn (November 19, 1897 – November 8, 1989) was an American football and basketball player and coach and college athletics administrator. He served as the head football coach at the South Dakota School of Mines—now known as South Dakota School of Mines and Technology—from 1929 to 1934 and Bethany College in Lindsborg, Kansas from 1938 to 1942 and again from 1946 to 1956, compiling a career college football coaching record of 70–104–4.

== Early life and playing career ==
Hahn was born on, November 19, 1897 in Clay Center, Kansas. He served in the United States Army during World War I.

Hahn attended Kansas State Agricultural College—now known as Kansas State University— in Manhattan, Kansas. There he participated in football, basketball, and track. He was the captain of the 1922 Kansas State Wildcats football team and was named to the Grantland Rice All-American team as a lineman. He also played in three games, all starts, for the Hammond Pros of the National Football League in 1926.

== Coaching career ==
=== Early coaching career ===
Hahn began his coaching career at Norton High School in Norton County, Kansas in 1923. The next year he moved on to Downers Grove High School in Downers Grove, Illinois. In 1928, he was appointed head basketball coach at Chadron Normal College—now known as Chadron State College—in Chadron, Nebraska and assistant coach in football and track under Arthur R. Stark.

=== South Dakota Mines ===
Hahn was the head football coach at the South Dakota School of Mines—now known as South Dakota School of Mines and Technology—from 1929 to 1934, compiling a record of 15–27.

=== Bethany ===
Hahn returned to coaching after a two-year absence when he was hired in 1938 as the athletic director and coach of all sports at Bethany College in Lindsborg, Kansas. He served as the head football coach at Bethany for 19 seasons between 1938 and 1956, compiling a record of 55–77–4. He took a leave of absence from 1943 to 1946 during World War II to coach and teach at Leavenworth High School in Leavenworth, Kansas. Hahn stepped down as Bethany's head football coach in 1957 and was replaced by Hal Collins. He remained Bethany's athletics director until 1966, when he was succeeded by Keith Rasmussen, the school's head football and track coach. Hahn continued as Bethany's head tennis and golf coach and as a professor of physical education.

== Legacy ==
The Bethany College gymnasium was named the Hahn Physical Education Building in his honor. Hahn was inducted into the National Association of Intercollegiate Athletics of Fame in 1966, an organization he helped to start as the National Association of Intercollegiate Basketball, the predecessor to the NAIA.

== Family and death ==
Hahn was married to Mildred M. Drebing on December 23, 1924, in Topeka, Kansas. He died on November 8, 1989, at Lindsborg Community Hospital.

== Head coaching record ==
=== College football ===
Year	Team	Overall	Conference	Standing	Bowl/playoffs
South Dakota Mines Hardrockers (South Dakota Intercollegiate Conference) (1929–1934)
1929	South Dakota Mines	3–4	3–2	5th	
1930	South Dakota Mines	3–5	2–4	8th	
1931	South Dakota Mines	2–5	2–3	T–7th	
1932	South Dakota Mines	1–6	1–3	T–7th	
1933	South Dakota Mines	4–3	3–1	4th	
1934	South Dakota Mines	2–4	2–2	T–5th	
South Dakota Mines:		15–27	13–15		
Bethany Swedes (Kansas Collegiate Athletic Conference) (1938–1942)
1938	Bethany	4–4	3–2	T–2nd	
1939	Bethany	3–5–1	3–2–1	2nd	
1940	Bethany	4–5	3–3	4th	
1941	Bethany	1–7	1–5	T–5th	
1942	Bethany	3–3–1	3–2–1	4th	
Bethany Swedes (Kansas Collegiate Athletic Conference) (1946–1956)
1946	Bethany	6–2	5–1	1st	
1947	Bethany	4–5	4–2	3rd	
1948	Bethany	6–3	5–1	2nd	
1949	Bethany	5–4	4–2	T–2nd	
1950	Bethany	3–5–1	2–3–1	4th	
1951	Bethany	4–5	2–4	5th	
1952	Bethany	5–4	3–3	3rd	
1953	Bethany	4–4	4–3	3rd	
1954	Bethany	1–6–1	1–5–1	7th	
1955	Bethany	1–8	1–6	7th	
1956	Bethany	1–7	1–6	7th	
Bethany:		55–77–4	46–50–4		
Total:		70–104–4			
National championship Conference title Conference division title or championship game berth
