= Sue Jean Covacevich =

American artist

- Born: Sue Jean Hill; February 15, 1905; Wellington, Kansas
- Died: May 14, 1998 (aged 93); Winfield, Kansas
- Known for: Painting and Stained Glass

Sue Jean Covacevich, born Sue Jean Hill (February 15, 1905 – May 14, 1998) also called Sue Jean Covacevich Boys, was a pioneering artist from Wellington Kansas, United States. Her vivid art in painting, prints, murals, and stained glass celebrates the Kansan landscape, and was heavily impacted by her time spent living in Mexico, and her extensive international travels. Teaching art at all education levels for over 40 years, she established the Winfield Art Center, and her work introducing art therapy at the Winfield State Hospital and Training Center awarded her an honorary doctorate of arts degree from Southwestern (Kansas) College.

== Education and Influences ==
Covacevich was heavily influenced by a number of other important artists. During her time at Lindsborg's Bethany College, she studied alongside Birger Sandzén, another landscape artist.

While in Mexico, Covacevich was heavily inspired by the mural painters and revolutionaries at the time, including Diego Rivera, husband of Frida Kahlo. During her residency at San Carlos Arts School, the two were able to meet, and she received critiques from the muralist.

== Lasting Legacies ==
While many of her pieces remain, and continue to influence people to this day, her art acted as a medium to convey an overwhelming sense of wanderlust in those she met. Her later travels to Russia and the Middle East brought back with them a global perspective that many of her students appreciated and would later emulate.

Covacevich is also remembered institutionally, with her collections continuing to find their ways into museums and galleries. Winfield, the town where she spent most of her career, also honors her with a scholarship, provided to promising art students.
