= Chief Jack House =

Chief Jack House (died 1971) was the last traditional, hereditary leader of the Ute Mountain Ute Tribe of Colorado. His grandson, Ernest House Sr., was later elected to serve as the Chairman of the Ute Mountain Ute Tribe for four, nonconsecutive four year terms in office from 1982 to 2010.

His great-grandson, Ernest House Jr. is currently [when?] active in the state of Colorado as an advocate for the Ute Mountain Ute Tribe and other Native American communities.
