= A. W. Kjellstrand =

Swedish American football coach

Biographical details
- Born: February 10, 1864; Skövde, Sweden
- Died: October 29, 1930 (aged 66); Rock Island, Illinois, U.S.

Coaching career (HC unless noted)
- 1893–1894: Bethany (KS)

Head coaching record
- Overall: 2–2

August William Kjellstrand (February 10, 1864 – October 29, 1930) was an American football coach.

== Coaching career ==
Kjellstrand was the first head football coach at Bethany College in Lindsborg, Kansas. He held that position for the 1893 and 1894 seasons. His coaching record at Bethany was 2–2.

== Academics ==
While at Bethany, he also worked as the professor of Latin and served as a pastor. He later was at Augustana College in Rock Island, Illinois where he was secretary of the college and later principal of the academy. He also completed several translations of academic works.
