= Milt Rehnquist =

American football player (1892–1971)

Profile
- Position: Offensive lineman

Personal information
- Born: April 3, 1892; Minnesota, U.S.
- Died: December 1971 (age 79)

Career information
- College: Bethany College

Career history
- 1924: Kansas City Blues
- 1925: Cleveland Bulldogs
- 1925–1926: Kansas City Cowboys
- 1927: Cleveland Bulldogs
- 1928–1931: Providence Steam Roller
- 1931: New York Giants
- 1932: Boston Braves

Awards and highlights
- First-team All-Pro (1929)

Milton Rehnquist (April 3, 1892 – December 1971) was an American football offensive lineman in the National Football League (NFL) for the Kansas City Blues, Cleveland Bulldogs, Kansas City Cowboys, Providence Steam Roller, New York Giants, and the Boston Braves. He attended Bethany College. After his professional football career, he additionally served as a high school football coach at La Salle Academy. He was inducted into the Rhode Island Heritage Hall of Fame in 1993.
