= Paul Hubbard (American football coach) =

American football coach

Playing career
- 2000–2001: Bethany (KS)
- 2002–2003: Northern Colorado
- Position: Defensive lineman

Coaching career (HC unless noted)
- 2006–2007: MidAmerica Nazarene (GA)
- 2008–2013: MidAmerica Nazarene (DC)
- 2014: Midland (DC)
- 2015–2018: Bethany (KS)

Head coaching record
- Overall: 11–32

Paul Hubbard is an American football coach. He served the head football coach at Bethany College in Lindsborg, Kansas from 2015 to 2018.

== Playing career ==
Hubbard played for two years at Bethany as a defensive lineman in 2000 and 2001 for College Football Hall of Fame coach Ted Kessinger. At Bethany he was named third team all-American by Don Hansen's Football Gazette. After his sophomore year, he transferred to the University of Northern Colorado where he earned second team all-American from Sports Network and third team all-American by the Associated Press. While at Northern Colorado, he led the nation with 16 1/2 sacks in 2003.

== Coaching career ==
Hubbard has served as an assistant coach at Midland University and MidAmerica Nazarene University. He was head coach at Bethany College in Lindsborg, Kansas from 2015 through the conclusion of the 2018 season, when he resigned after compiling a record of 11–32 in four seasons.

== Head coaching record ==
Year	Team	Overall	Conference	Standing	Bowl/playoffs
Bethany Swedes (Kansas Collegiate Athletic Conference) (2015–2018)
2015	Bethany	3–8	3–6	T–5th	
2016	Bethany	1–10	1–8	T–9th	
2017	Bethany	5–5	4–5	T–5th	
2018	Bethany	2–9	2–8	11th	
Bethany:		11–32	10–27		
Total:		11–32			
