= Ernest House Sr. =

Leader of the Ute Mountain Ute Tribe (born 1945)

Ernest House Sr. (September 27, 1945 – September 17, 2011) was an American tribal leader who served as the chairman of the Ute Mountain Ute Tribe for four 4-year terms from 1982 to 2010.

== Biography ==
=== Early life ===
Ernest House was born in Mancos Canyon on September 27, 1945, to Thomas House Sr. and Francis Marie (née Wall). A member of the Weeminuche Band of the Ute Mountain Ute Tribe, House was the grandson of the last hereditary chief of the Ute Mountain Ute, Chief Jack House. He was raised in Mancos Canyon in southwestern Colorado.

House served as a veteran of the Colorado Army National Guard within the Special Forces Airborne Group. He was also employed by the National Park Service and the Bureau of Indian Affairs at various times during his career.

=== Ute Mountain Ute tribal chairman ===
Ernest House worked for the Ute Mountain Ute Tribe for more than fifty years, including more than thirty years in Ute tribal politics. House was elected to the Ute Mountain Ute Tribal Council in 1979. In 1982, he was elected to his first term as chairman of the Ute Mountain Ute. He was elected to four nonconsecutive 4-year terms as chairman between 1982 and 2010. His most recent, fourth term as chairman ended in 2010.

House simultaneously served as the CEO of Ute Mountain Ute Tribal Business and Enterprise and the head of the Ute Tribal Council during his tenure as chairman. House was an advocate of Native American businesses and entrepreneurship. He championed the upgrading of Native American public safety programs and healthcare facilities in his home state of Colorado, as well as Utah and New Mexico. He also testified before the United States Congress during congressional hearings on the Animas-La Plata Water Project and the Dolores Project.

House spearheaded an increasing in public security between 2005 and 2010. He increased the number of police officers in the Ute Mountain Ute tribal police force from just two officers to more than twelve during those years. He had recently reached out to freshman U.S. Rep. Scott Tipton (R-Colorado) to have a tribute to his grandfather, Chief Jack House, an advocate for tribal healthcare, read on the floor of the United States House of Representatives.

Ernest House was seriously injured in a motorcycle accident near Cortez, Colorado, on the afternoon of September 17, 2011. House was returning from a motorcycle rally when he was struck by an oncoming car that was trying to pass another vehicle. House, who was riding his motorcycle, suffered a broken pelvis and leg in the accident. The driver of the car that struck House was charged with careless driving, and heavy rains may have contributed to the accident. House was transported to San Juan Regional Medical Center in Farmington, New Mexico, where he lost consciousness and died of his injuries later on September 17 at the age of 65.

House was survived by his three children, Michelle House, Jaque House-Lopez and Ernest House Jr.; his father, Thomas House Sr., and five grandchildren. He was a resident of McElmo Canyon in Colorado.

The United States District Court for the District of Colorado Troy Eid has said, "Indian Country has lost a brilliant, courageous and inspired leader, as has the entire State of Colorado." Eid also called House's death "tragic beyond words." A traditional Ute wake and funeral service will be held on September 23 and 24, 2011, in Towaoc, Colorado. He will be buried in Towaoc Cemetery.
