= Guy C. Omer =

American football coach and college athletics administrator

Guy Omer
Biographical details
- Born: June 12, 1891; Mankato, Kansas, U.S.
- Died: 1952 (aged 60–61); Mankato, Kansas, U.S.
- Education: Kansas State University

Coaching career (HC unless noted)
- 1920–1921: Bethany (KS)

Administrative career (AD unless noted)
- 1920–1922: Bethany (KS)

Head coaching record
- Overall: 9–6–1

Guy Clifton Omer (June 12, 1891 – 1952) was an American football coach and college athletics administrator. He served as the head football coach at Bethany College in Lindsborg, Kansas from 1920 to 1921, compiling a record of 9–6–1. He was also the athletic director at Bethany from 1920 until his resignation in April 1922.

== Head coaching record ==
Year	Team	Overall	Conference	Standing	Bowl/playoffs
Bethany Swedes (Kansas Collegiate Athletic Conference) (1920–1921)
1920	Bethany	4–3–1	4–3–1	T–5th	
1921	Bethany	5–3	4–3	T–6th	
Bethany:		9–6–1	8–6–1		
Total:		9–6–1			
