= Myra Biggerstaff =

American painter (1905–1999)

- Born: 1905; Logansport, Indiana, U.S
- Died: 1999 (aged 93–94); Auburn, Nebraska, U.S
- Education: Bethany College (B.A)
- Spouse(s): Roland Kvistberg (m. 1933–1947) William Holliday (m. 1950)

Myra Biggerstaff (1905–1999) was one of twelve American women artists who are now recognized as having had an influence on art and art education in Nebraska. She is recognized for her portraits and abstract paintings.

== Life, education and early career ==
Biggerstaff was born in Logansport, Indiana, the daughter of Blanche Berry Biggerstaff, a teacher, and Oliver Biggerstaff, a railway telegrapher. In 1909, the family moved to Omaha, Nebraska.

Biggerstaff gained a teaching certificate at Bethany College in Lindsborg, Kansas, mentored by Dr. Birger Sandzen. She taught in schools in Kansas and Texas before returning to be Sandzen's assistant. In 1932, she gained a BA in Fine Arts from Bethany College. She then went to Paris for one year with Sandzen's daughter Margaret, living at the Cité Internationale Universitaire de Paris. There she studied art with André Lhote. She met her future husband when taking Professor Roland Kvistberg's language classes at the university.

== Later career ==
She traveled next to Uppsala, Sweden where she organized a joint exhibition of Birger Sandzen's graphic works and her own watercolors at the Uppsala University gallery. Moving to Stockholm in 1934, she attended the Swedish Royal Academy's graphic arts school on a full scholarship studying under printmaker Harald Sallberg She participated in the Bromma artists' exhibition at Bromma läroverk, now gymnasium. Biggerstaff lived in Sweden until the end of World War II. In 1950, Biggerstaff moved to New York City where at first she concentrated on portraiture. She exhibited at the Whyte Gallery in Washington, D.C., and at the Joslyn Memorial Museum in Omaha, Nebraska.

At the same time, she resumed her teaching career, now at Trinity University in San Antonio, Texas. She worked there for two years before moving to New York City to study for an MA in fine arts at Columbia University Teachers College. In New York City she participated in several art exhibitions and gained awards and honorable mentions for her art, which by now was more abstract and involved different media. An example of her more geometric style can be seen in her painting The Red Boat. Biggerstaff taught at the Fashion Institute of Technology in New York City from 1960 until she retired in 1972. While there she became associate professor, departmental chair and had a solo exhibition. Biggerstaff continued to exhibit and donate until her death in 1999. She told a reporter of the Auburn newspaper in 1995 that "painting is my first love."

== Awards ==
The Bainbridge Award in Watercolor for the National Association of Women Artists. An Audubon Artist's cash award at the National Academy Galleries in New York City. A Prix De Paris award. Biggerstaff is now recognized along with artists such as Gladys Lux, Kady Faulkner, Elizabeth Honor Dolan, Angel de Cora and Alice Righter Edrington as influential.

“Highly talented, quietly indomitable, but still largely overlooked in the history of art in Nebraska, twelve nineteenth and early twentieth century women left an enduring artistic legacy and greatly influenced the arts in this young prairie state.“

== Private life ==
In 1933 Biggerstaff married Roland Kvistberg who had been a teacher at Bethany College. They divorced in 1946/1947. In the 1950s she married William Holliday, a singer.
