= Emory Lindquist =

American historian

Dr. Emory Kempton Lindquist (Feb. 29, 1908 – Jan. 27, 1992) was the president of Bethany College (1943–1953) in Lindsborg, Kansas and Wichita State University in Wichita, Kansas (1963–1968). He also served as a professor and authored many articles and books, especially regarding Swedish-American history.

== Early life ==
Emory K. Lindquist was born in Lindsborg, Kansas. He was the son of Harry Theodore Lindquist (1879–1938) and Augusta Amelia Peterson Lindquist (1885–1973) and was the grandson of Swedish immigrants. He graduated from Bethany College in 1930 and won a prestigious Rhodes Scholarship to University of Oxford in England where he received another bachelor's degree and a master's degree from Jesus College, Oxford and then returned to Bethany to teach in 1933. Lindquist received his Ph.D. from the University of Colorado in 1941. In 1942 Lindquist married Irma Winifred Eleanor (Lann) Lindquist (1909–2007), an alumna of Bethany and a nurse, whom he met at a college reunion.

== Career ==
Lindquist served as President of Bethany College from 1943 to 1953. From 1953 to 1978 he served as professor at Wichita State University. During this period he also served as a Dean and then President of Wichita State University from 1963 to 1968. While president, Lindquist was a member of the Urban League board and added African American staff and faculty to the university. Lindquist continued writing into his retirement and died in 1992 and was buried in the Smoky Hill Cemetery.

== Honors ==
- Knighted by King Carl XVI Gustaf of Sweden and received the Order of the North Star in 1976
- Carl Sandburg Medal from the Swedish-American Historical Society in 1987
- Great Swedish Heritage Award from the Swedish Council of America in 1990
- Lindquist Hall in the Wallerstedt Library at Bethany College, and the Emory Lindquist Honors Program at Wichita State are named in Lindquist's honor.

== Selected works ==
- Smoky Valley People: A History of Lindsborg, Kansas (1953)
- The Protestant church in Kansas: an annotated bibliography (1956)
- Vision for a valley: Olof Olsson and the early history of Lindsborg (1970)
- An immigrant's American odyssey: a biography of Ernst Skarstedt (1970)
- An immigrant's two worlds: a biography of Hjalmar Edgren (1972)
- Bethany in Kansas: the history of a college (1975)
- Hagbard Brase: beloved music master (1985)
- Birger Sandzén, An Illustrated Biography (1993)

== See also ==
- Birger Sandzén
- Ernst Skarstedt
- Hjalmar Edgren
- Olof Olsson
