= Curran White =

American football coach

Current position
- Title: Offensive coordinator & offensive line coach
- Team: Concordia (WI)
- Conference: NACC

Coaching career (HC unless noted)
- 2001–2005: Wayne State (NE) (assistant)
- 2005–2011: Missouri Valley (OL)
- 2012–2016: Concordia (NE) (AHC/OC)
- 2017–2018: Ottawa (OC)
- 2019: Bethany (KS)
- 2020–2024: Concordia (WI) (OC/QB)
- 2025–present: Concordia (WI) (OC/OL)

Head coaching record
- Overall: 4–6

Curran White is an American college football coach. He is the offensive coordinator and offensive line coach for Concordia University Wisconsin, positions he has held since 2025. White was the head football coach at Bethany College in Lindsborg, Kansas in 2019. He had previously worked for 18 years as an assistant coach at several college programs including his immediate prior post as offensive coordinator at Ottawa University.

== Assistant coaching ==
Before his two seasons at Ottawa, White was assistant head coach and offensive coordinator at Concordia University Nebraska, offensive line coach at Missouri Valley College, and assistant coach and recruiting coordinator at Wayne State College.

== Bethany ==
White began his first head coach duties at Bethany in Lindsborg, Kansas starting with the 2019 season. His team got their first win against conference opponent Saint Mary in their second game with a 21–14 win.

== Head coaching record ==
Year	Team	Overall	Conference	Standing	Bowl/playoffs
Bethany Swedes (Kansas Collegiate Athletic Conference) (2019)
2019	Bethany	4–6	4–6	8th	
Bethany:		4–6	4–6		
Total:		4–6			
