= Birger Sandzén Memorial Gallery =

Art museum in Lindsborg, Kansas

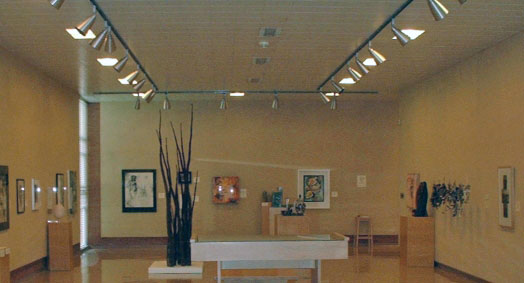
Inside of the Birger Sandzén Memorial Gallery (2004)

The Birger Sandzén Memorial Gallery is located in Lindsborg in McPherson County, Kansas. The memorial art gallery is located in "Little Sweden," a town founded by Swedish immigrants. The gallery is dedicated to Birger Sandzén, who was a Swedish-born painter. He produced most of his work in the United States, where he worked as an art professor at Bethany College in Lindsborg. Sandzén painted many landscape scenes, including depictions of the American Old West, the Rockies, and Yellowstone National Park. The gallery has oils, watercolors, and prints by Sandzén.

== Location ==
The Birger Sandzén Memorial Gallery is located at 410 North First Street in Lindsborg.

== Hours ==
The gallery is open to the public from 1:00 p.m. to 5:00 p.m., Tuesday through Sunday, and closed on Monday and major holidays.
