= Phil Miller (American football) =

American football coach

Biographical details
- Born: 1933 or 1934 (age 92–93)

Coaching career (HC unless noted)
- 1961–1964: Bethany (KS)

Head coaching record
- Overall: 16–18–2

Philip Miller (born c. 1933) is an American former football coach. He was the head football coach at Bethany College in Lindsborg, Kansas, serving for four seasons, from 1961 to 1964, and compiling a record of 16–18–2.

== Head coaching record ==
Year	Team	Overall	Conference	Standing	Bowl/playoffs
Bethany Swedes (Kansas Collegiate Athletic Conference) (1961–1964)
1961	Bethany	3–4–2	3–4–2	T–5th	
1962	Bethany	4–5	4–5	6th	
1963	Bethany	6–3	6–3	3rd	
1964	Bethany	3–6	3–6	T–6th	
Bethany:		16–18–2	16–18–2		
Total:		16–18–2			
