= Tony Johnson (American football coach) =

American football coach

Coaching career (HC unless noted)
- 2004–2005: Bethany (KS)

Head coaching record
- Overall: 5–14

Tony Johnson is an American football coach. He served as the head football coach at Bethany College in Lindsborg, Kansas from 2004 to 2005, compiling a record of 5–14.

== Head coaching record ==
=== College ===
Year	Team	Overall	Conference	Standing	Bowl/playoffs
Bethany Terrible Swedess (Kansas Collegiate Athletic Conference) (2004–2005)
2004	Bethany	3–6	3–6	T–8th	
2005	Bethany	2–8	2–7	T–8th	
Bethany:		5–14	5–13		
Total:		5–14			
