= Van Hollaway =

American football coach

Coaching career (HC unless noted)
- 1974–1975: Bethany (KS)

Head coaching record
- Overall: 9–11

Van Hollaway is an American former football coach. He served as the head football coach at Bethany College in Lindsborg, Kansas, from 1974 to 1975, compiling a record of 9–11.

== Head coaching record ==
Year	Team	Overall	Conference	Standing	Bowl/playoffs
Bethany Swedes (Kansas Collegiate Athletic Conference) (1974–1975)
1974	Bethany	6–4	5–3	T–2nd	
1975	Bethany	3–7	3–5	6th	
Bethany:		9–11	8–8		
Total:		9–11			
