= George Carlson (footballer) =

English footballer

Personal information
- Full name: George Edward Carlson
- Date of birth: 27 July 1925
- Place of birth: Liverpool, England
- Date of death: August 2006 (aged 80–81)
- Place of death: Liverpool, England
- Position: Centre forward

Senior career*
Years	Team	Apps	(Gls)
1947–1949	Tranmere Rovers	2	(0)
- * Club domestic league appearances and goals

George Edward Carlson (27 July 1925 – August 2006) was an English footballer, who played as a centre forward in the Football League for Tranmere Rovers.
