= Keith Rasmussen =

American football player, coach, and administrator

Biographical details
- Born: 1936 or 1937 (age 89–90)

Playing career
- 1954–1957: Bethany (KS)
- Position: Center

Coaching career (HC unless noted)
- 1958–1959: Geneseo HS (KS)
- 1960–1963: Colby HS (KS)
- 1965–1973: Bethany (KS)

Administrative career (AD unless noted)
- 1966–1974: Bethany (KS)

Head coaching record
- Overall: 42–39–3 (college football)
- Bowls: 1–1

Accomplishments and honors

Championships
- 1 KCAC (1973)

E. Keith Rasmussen is an American former football coach and college athletics administrator. He served as the head football coach at Bethany College in Lindsborg, Kansas from 1965 to 1973, compiling a record of 42–39–3. Rasmussen was also the athletic director at Bethany from 1966 to 1974.

== Head coaching record ==
=== College football ===
Year	Team	Overall	Conference	Standing	Bowl/playoffs
Bethany Swedes (Kansas Collegiate Athletic Conference) (1965–1963)
1965	Bethany	7–2	7–2	2nd	
1966	Bethany	4–5	4–5	6th	
1967	Bethany	2–7	2–7	8th	
1968	Bethany	3–5–1	3–5–1	6th	
1969	Bethany	4–5	2–3	T–3rd (North)	
1970	Bethany	3–5–1	2–3	4th (North)	
1971	Bethany	8–2	7–1	2nd	W Mineral Water
1972	Bethany	4–4–1	4–3–1	4th	
1973	Bethany	7–4	7–1	T–1st	L Boot Hill
Bethany:		42–39–3	38–30–2		
Total:		42–39–3			
National championship Conference title Conference division title or championship game berth
