= Harrison Keller =

American violinist and music educator (1888–1979)

Harrison Keller (October 8, 1888 – March 13, 1979) was an American violinist and music educator.

Keller was born in Delphos, Kansas, and began his violin studies at Bethany College in Lindsborg, Kansas, graduating in 1907. From 1907 to 1911, he continued his studies at the Stern Conservatory in Berlin, Germany. Keller also studied with Anton Witek in Prague (1912) and Leopold Auer in St. Petersburg, Russia (1913 to 1914).

Keller served in the United States Army during World War I, acting as leader of the 301st Artillery Band in France, and received the French Legion of Honor. On his return to the United States, he put together the Boston String Quartet in Boston, Massachusetts. Keller joined the faculty of New England Conservatory of Music in 1921 as head of the violin department. From 1922 to 1946, Keller was head of the string department. From 1947 to 1952, he served as the conservatory’s sixth director; and from 1952 to 1958, president of its board of directors. In 1974, New England Conservatory created and endowed the Harrison Keller String Quartet in his honor.

Keller served as director of the Boston Opera Association, was a trustee of the Paderewski and Frank Huntington Beebe Funds, and served as president of the National Association of Schools of Music for three terms. He was also appointed to the American Academy of Arts and received honorary doctorates from Bethany College in 1954, Hartt School of Music in 1955, and New England Conservatory in 1959.

Keller died in Wellesley, Massachusetts, aged 90.
