= Marlies Gipson =

American basketball player (born 1987)

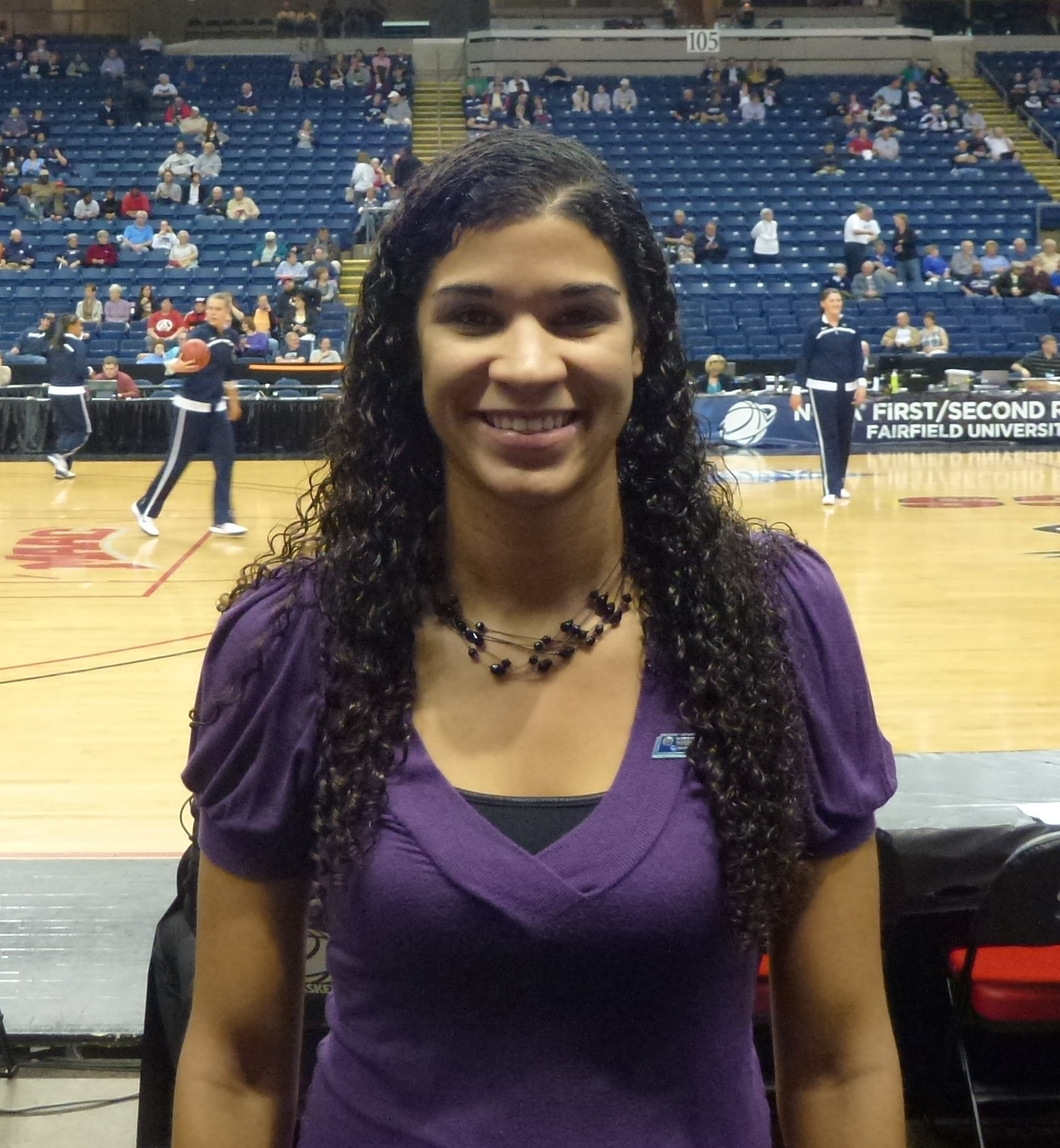

Personal information
- Born: January 2, 1987 (age 39) Hays, Kansas, USA
- Listed height: 6 ft 0 in (1.83 m)

Career information
- High school: McPherson (McPherson, Kansas)
- College: Kansas State (2005–2009)
- Position: Forward

Career highlights
- Big 12 All-Freshman Team (2006)

Marlies Marie Gipson (born January 2, 1987) is an American former basketball player. She played collegiately at Kansas State University. She was named to the 2005–2006 Big 12 Conference all-rookie team. She was also a member of the Atlanta Dream of the Women's National Basketball Association in 2009 but was waived before the start of the season.

== Early life ==
Gipson was born in Hays, Kansas, and moved to McPherson when she was 1 year old with her mother, who began her teaching career there in McPherson. Gipson was always interested in basketball. She began competing in the 4th grade, in a local school league. She played with the McPherson BullPups MAYB team starting in the fall of 5th grade. They were successful and won numerous MAYB tournaments over the years. She began playing on the AAU team the Kansas Belles in 2002. The team did well each year at AAU Nationals winning the 2005 AAU-19 National Championship in Orlando, FL. Her high school team the McPherson Bullpups were one of the best teams in the state during her career. They got 2nd place in 2003, 2004 at the 5A Class State championships and going 25–0 undefeated 5A State champions in 2005, a game in which Gipson netted 17 rebounds and rejected 17 blocked shots.

== College career ==
In the 2005–2006 season, Gipson was the only Kansas State Wildcat to start all 34 games. She averaged 26.5 minutes per game, .466 field goal percentage, .438 3-point percentage, .674 free throw percentage, 6.4 rebounds per game, 54 assists, 76 turnovers, 62 blocks, 41 steals, 282 points, an average of 8.3 per game. The Wildcats went 24–10 and won the Women's National Invitation Tournament.

In the 2006–2007 season, Gipson went down with a season-ending injury. She averaged 28.4 minutes per game, in the 16 she played. .473 field goal percentage, .571 3-point percentage, ..706 free throw percentage, 8.3 rebounds per game, 25 assists, 37 turnovers, 39 blocks, 20 steals, 204 points, an average of 12.8 per game. The Wildcats went 19–15 and were in the final four of the Women's National Invitation Tournament.

== Professional career ==
Gipson signed with the Atlanta Dream of the Women's National Basketball Association on May 12, 2009. She was waived on May 29, 2009.

== Kansas State statistics ==
Legend
| GP | Games played | GS | Games started | MPG | Minutes per game |
| FG% | Field goal percentage | 3P% | 3-point field goal percentage | FT% | Free throw percentage |
| RPG | Rebounds per game | APG | Assists per game | SPG | Steals per game |
| BPG | Blocks per game | PPG | Points per game | **Bold** | Career high |

| Year | Team | GP | Points | FG% | 3P% | FT% | RPG | APG | SPG | BPG | PPG |
|---|---|---|---|---|---|---|---|---|---|---|---|
| 2005–06 | Kansas State | **34** | 282 | 46.6 | 43.8 | 67.4 | 6.4 | 1.6 | 1.2 | 1.8 | 8.3 |
| 2006–07 | Kansas State | 16 | 204 | 47.3 | **57.1** | 70.6 | **8.3** | 1.6 | **1.3** | 2.4 | 12.8 |
| 2007–08 | Kansas State | 32 | 375 | 50.8 | 27.3 | 72.3 | 7.5 | 1.6 | 1.2 | 2.2 | 11.7 |
| 2008–09 | Kansas State | 33 | **442** | **51.3** | 21.7 | **72.9** | 6.7 | **2.3** | 1.2 | **2.6** | **13.4** |
| Career | Kansas State | 115 | 1303 | 49.4 | 32.4 | 71.1 | 7.1 | 1.8 | 1.2 | 2.2 | 11.3 |

== Notes and references ==
- K-State Women's Basketball Homepage
