= Hal Collins =

American football coach

Biographical details
- Born: September 26, 1926; Fort Leavenworth, Kansas, U.S.
- Died: May 27, 2016 (aged 89); Fergus Falls, Minnesota, U.S.

Coaching career (HC unless noted)
- 1957–1960: Bethany (KS)

Head coaching record
- Overall: 11–20–3

Harold L. Collins (September 26, 1926 – May 27, 2016) was an American football coach. He was the head football coach at Bethany College in Lindsborg, Kansas, serving for four seasons, from 1957 to 1960, and compiling a record of 11–20–3.

== Head coaching record ==
Year	Team	Overall	Conference	Standing	Bowl/playoffs
Bethany Swedes (Kansas Collegiate Athletic Conference) (1957–1960)
1957	Bethany	0–8	0–7	8th	
1958	Bethany	3–4–1	2–4–1	T–6th	
1959	Bethany	4–4–1	2–4–1	6th	
1960	Bethany	4–4–1	4–4–1	T–5th	
Bethany:		11–20–3	8–19–3		
Total:		11–20–3			
