= Chief Ignacio =

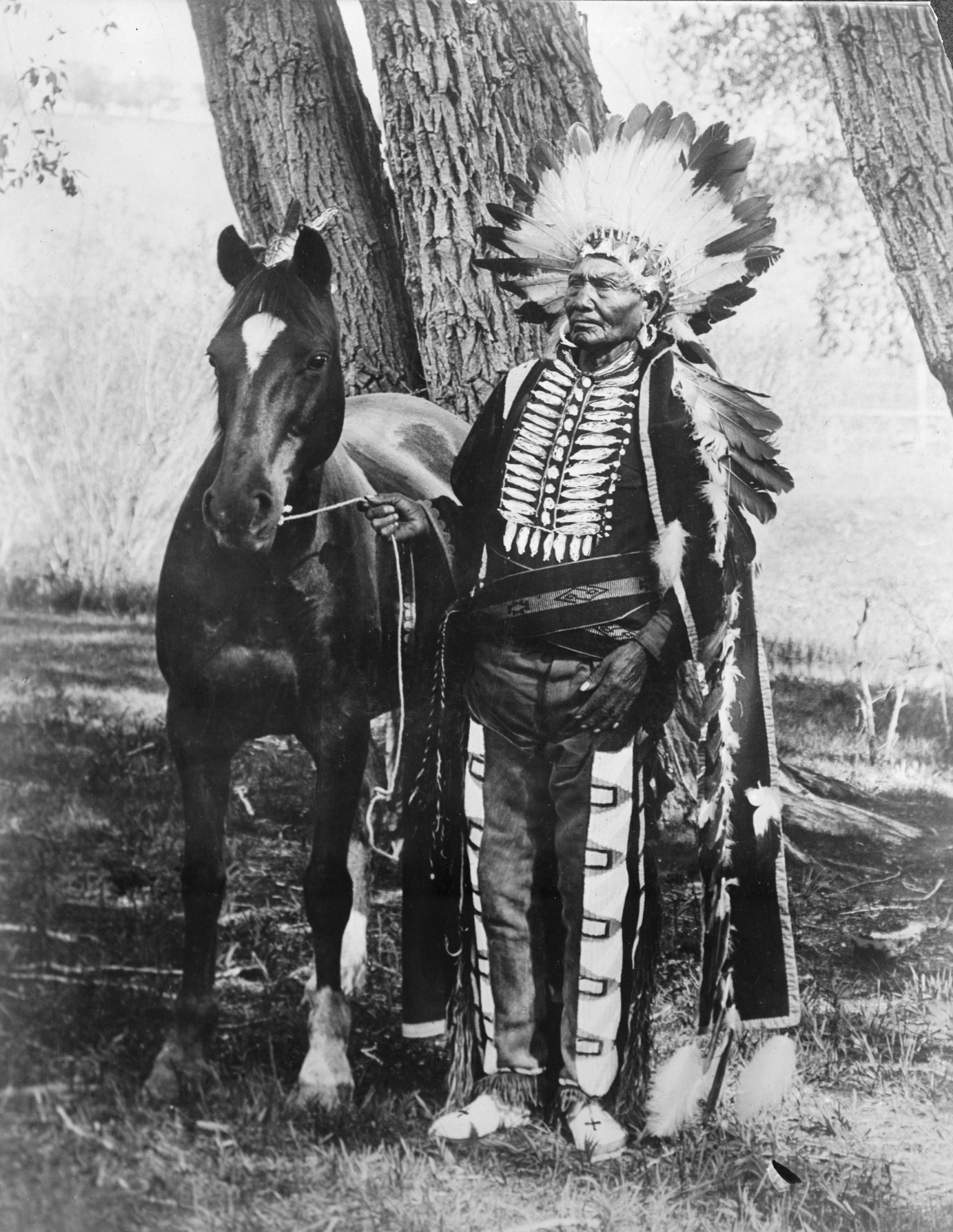
Chief Ignacio c. 1904

Chief Ignacio (c. 1828 – 1913) was a chief of the Weeminuche band of the Ute tribe of American Indians, also called the Southern Utes, located in present-day Colorado north of the San Juan River.

Ignacio led the band through many difficult years in the late nineteenth century, when they were being encroached on by European-American settlers. In January 1880, Chief Ignacio was part of the Ute delegation that traveled to Washington, DC to testify before the US Congress about the 1879 Meeker Massacre and the Ute uprising among the northern Utes on the White River. Although the Weeminuche had not participated in that violence, white settlers wanted to push all the Utes away from their areas. The Utes tried to negotiate for peace, but later that year Congress passed legislation forcing the Utes into reservations. Unlike the Northern and Central bands of Utes, who were forced to reservations in Utah, the Weeminuche and two other Southern bands managed to stay in Colorado.

Together with the Muache and Capote Utes, the Weeminuche occupied the Southern Ute Indian Reservation in southern Colorado and named their capital Ignacio in the chief's honor.

In 1887, the US Congress passed the General Allotment Act, better known as the Dawes Act. It was intended to regulate the breakup of the communal Native American lands and assign separate householder allotments of 160 acres each, with "surplus" land to be sold on the open market. This was another step in assimilating the Native Americans to European-American ways, based on individual landholdings. In 1895 the Southern Utes voted on the issue, narrowly passing a measure for allotment.

Refusing to have their land broken up, Ignacio and the Weeminuche people moved to the western part of the Southern Ute Reservation in 1896. Their descendants have occupied the Ute Mountain Ute Reservation with headquarters at Navajo Springs. Later, they moved their capital to Towaoc. The Ute Mountain Ute are one of three federally recognized tribes of the Ute people.
