= John Frykman =

American psychologist

John Harvey Frykman
- Born: 19 April 1932; Boston, Massachusetts, U.S.
- Died: 21 October 2017 (aged 85); Los Angeles, California, U.S.
- Occupations: Lutheran minister and psychotherapist

John Harvey Frykman (19 April 1932 – 21 October 2017) was a Lutheran minister and American psychotherapist specializing in brief therapy, medical hypnosis, and family therapy. He was the founding director of the drug treatment program at the Haight Ashbury Free Clinic in San Francisco, California, and is noted for his problem-solving, individualized approach to substance abuse therapy and solution focused brief therapy.

== Education and military service ==
During his initial higher education, he earned a Certificate in Architectural Construction from Wentworth Institute, Boston, a B.A. in Sociology from Bethany College, Kansas, and a Master of Divinity from Philadelphia Lutheran Theological Seminary. He spent two years in the U.S. Army, with overseas duty in Korea. Pastoral work in New York, Pennsylvania and California provided years of experience with inner-city situations and a close-at-hand understanding of chemical dependency problems. Along the way he developed skills in community organization, inter-group relations, clinical counseling and group work. Jay Haley and Milton H. Erickson, M.D. were colleagues and very important influences in his life. He is a California-licensed Marriage Family and Child Counselor, and in 1982 he earned a Ph.D. in clinical psychology from Ryokan College, Los Angeles.

== Haight Ashbury ==
In 1968, Frykman became the founding director of the drug treatment program at the Haight-Ashbury Free Clinic in San Francisco. In this role, he received training in pharmacology and the medical treatment of drug crises from Dr. Frederick Meyers of the University of California Medical Center, San Francisco, and Dr. David E. Smith at the Haight Ashbury Free Medical Clinic.

== Teaching ==
Frykman was then recruited to become the first "community counselor" for the Carmel Unified School District, where he worked directly with young people and their families and developed a community-based approach to substance abuse problems. In addition, he taught at the National Drug Abuse Training Center and the University of California Extension where a wide range of courses dealt with the nature of drugs, lifestyles of substance abusers, and approaches to treatment, education and prevention. He also taught pastoral care and family therapy at Gurukul Lutheran Theological College and Research Institute, Madras, India, in 1988.

== Cypress Institute ==
Since 1971, Frykman has been president of Cypress Institute (Monterey and San Francisco), a non-profit corporation for research and direct services in the fields of human communication, organizational development, education, and counseling, with an emphasis on systems understanding and strategic, rapid problem-solving.

== Lutheran minister ==
After completing seminary (ranking fifth in his graduation class) Frykman served as associate pastor at the First English Lutheran Church in Sacramento, pastor at St. John's Lutheran Church in Oakland, California, pastor at the First United Lutheran Church, San Francisco and, in 2009, as VIM pastor at Bukit Doa International Church in Nusa Dua, Bali, Indonesia.

On January 1, 1996, First United Lutheran Church of San Francisco, along with St. Francis Lutheran Church, was expelled from the Evangelical Lutheran Church of America (ELCA), because they violated a provision of the ELCA constitution. In January 1990, under Frykman's leadership, the two congregations called and ordained a gay man and a lesbian couple, graduates of Lutheran seminaries, who were not approved for ordination by the ELCA solely because they refused to pledge lifelong celibacy. In the face of this judgment against them, these congregations, along with their companion congregations, continued to stand by their decision. Frykman said during his trial for ordaining non-celibate homosexual ministers in 1990, "Ecclesiastical disobedience in the face of unjust practice in the church was in the best tradition of Martin Luther."[2]

== International impact ==
Frykman has worked extensively overseas, teaching and consulting in Norway, England, Sweden, Germany, Finland, India, Spain, Greece, the Philippines, and France. In January 2005, Lutheran Lesbian and Gay Ministries (LLGM) presented Frykman with the "Voice of Distinction" award at a gala banquet celebrating its 15th anniversary. These awards are given to individuals and organizations in recognition of their outstanding commitment, dedication, and sacrifice on behalf of sexual minority persons. Frykman has consulted or taught in 16 countries and 27 U.S. states.

== Bibliography ==
Single-authored

- THE HASSLE HANDBOOK (1984)
- The Hassle Handbook: A Guide to Teenage Survival (August 1988)
- The NEW Hassle Handbook: A Guide Through the Teen Age Years (November 19, 2007)

Co-authored

- A New Connection: A Problem Solving Approach to Chemical Dependency (written with Richard B. Seymour, David E. Smith and Frederick H. Meyers) (March 1991)
- Making the Impossible Difficult: Tools for Getting Unstuck (written with Thorana Nelson) (October 13, 2003)
