= George Carlson (American football) =

American football coach

Biographical details
- Born: December 20, 1897; Lindsborg, Kansas, U.S.
- Died: April 1, 1953 (aged 55); Longmont, Colorado, U.S.

Coaching career (HC unless noted)
- 1927–1933: Bethany (KS)

Head coaching record
- Overall: 21–29–7

George Carl "Cash" Carlson (December 20, 1897 – April 1, 1953) was an American football coach. he served as the head football coach at Bethany College in Lindsborg, Kansas for seven seasons, from 1927 to 1933, compiling a record of 21–29–7.

== Death ==
Carlson died suddenly in 1953 at his home in Colorado, where he had moved seven years prior. He was survived by his wife, Helen Church, two daughters and two sons.

== Head coaching record ==
Year	Team	Overall	Conference	Standing	Bowl/playoffs
Bethany Swedes (Kansas Collegiate Athletic Conference) (1927–1933)
1927	Bethany	4–2–1	3–2–1	7th	
1928	Bethany	5–3	5–1	T–2nd	
1929	Bethany	5–3–1	4–1	2nd	
1930	Bethany	3–4–2	2–2–1	T–3rd	
1931	Bethany	2–4–3	1–1–2	T–2nd	
1932	Bethany	1–6	1–3	4th	
1933	Bethany	1–7	0–4	5th	
Bethany:		21–29–6	16–14–4		
Total:		21–29–7			
