= Ute Mountain Ute Tribe =

Ute Mountain Reservation
- Reservation
- Flag Seal
- Location of the Ute Mountain Reservation
- Constitution: 1940
- Seat of Government: Towaoc, Colorado

Government
  - Body: Tribal Administration Department
  - Chairman of the Tribal Administration Department: Harold Cuthair

Area
  - Total: 2,238 km^{2} (864 sq mi)

Population (2020)
  - Total: 1,656
- Time zone: MST/MDT

The Ute Mountain Ute Tribe /ˈjuːt/ (Ute dialect: Wʉgama Núuchi) is one of three federally recognized tribes of the Ute Nation, and are mostly descendants of the historic Weeminuche Band who moved to the Southern Ute reservation in 1897. Their reservation is headquartered at Towaoc, Colorado, on the Ute Mountain Ute Indian Reservation in southwestern Colorado, northwestern New Mexico and small sections of Utah.

== History ==
The Ute Mountain Ute Tribe are descendants of the Weeminuche band (Weminuche, Weemeenooch, Wiminuc, Guiguinuches) lived west of the Great Divide along the Dolores River of western Colorado, in the Abajo Mountains, in the Valley of the San Juan River its northern tributaries and in the San Juan Mountains including eastern Utah. They moved to the Southern Ute reservation in 1897.

Two thousand years ago, the Utes lived and ranged in the mountains and desert over much of the Colorado Plateau present day eastern Utah, western Colorado, northern Arizona and northwestern New Mexico. The use of lands in the Four Corners area, where the Ute Mountain Ute tribe now live, though, came later. Most anthropologists agree that Utes were established in the Four Corners area by 1500 C.E. The Ute people were hunters and gatherers who moved on foot to hunting grounds and gathering land based upon the season. The men hunted animals, including deer, antelope, buffalo, rabbits, and other small mammals and birds. Women gathered different types of grass, nuts, berries, roots, and greens in woven baskets. They also processed and stored meat and plant materials for winter use. Ute in the western part of their territory lived in wickiups and ramadas. Hide tipis were used in the eastern reaches of their territory.

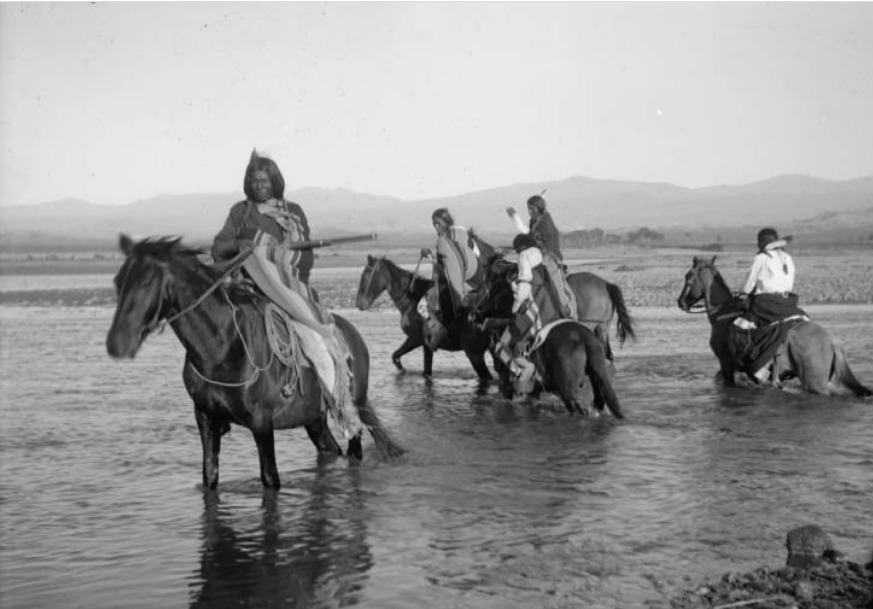
Utes on horseback in the 1890s

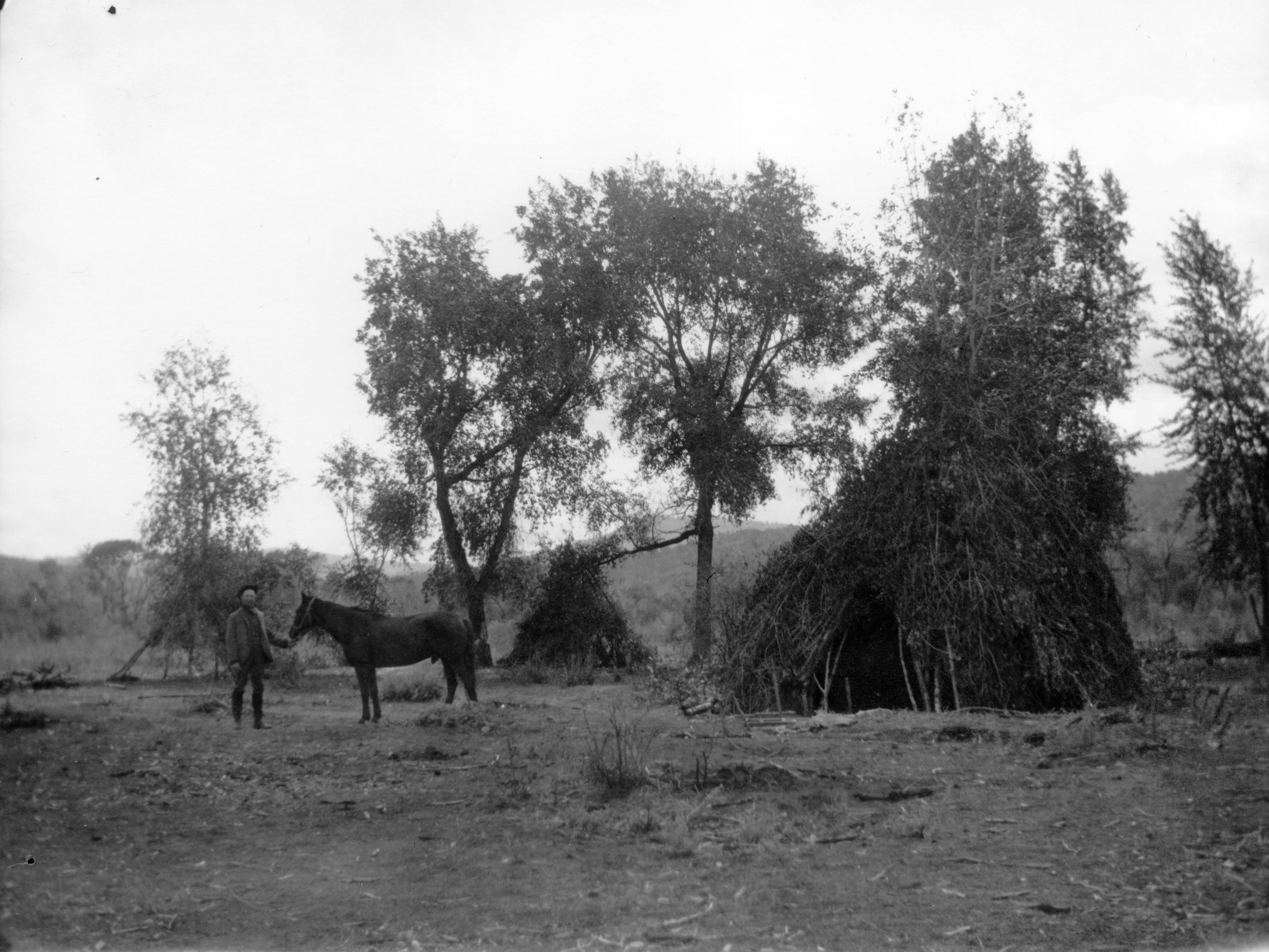
Ute wickiup used in the western regions

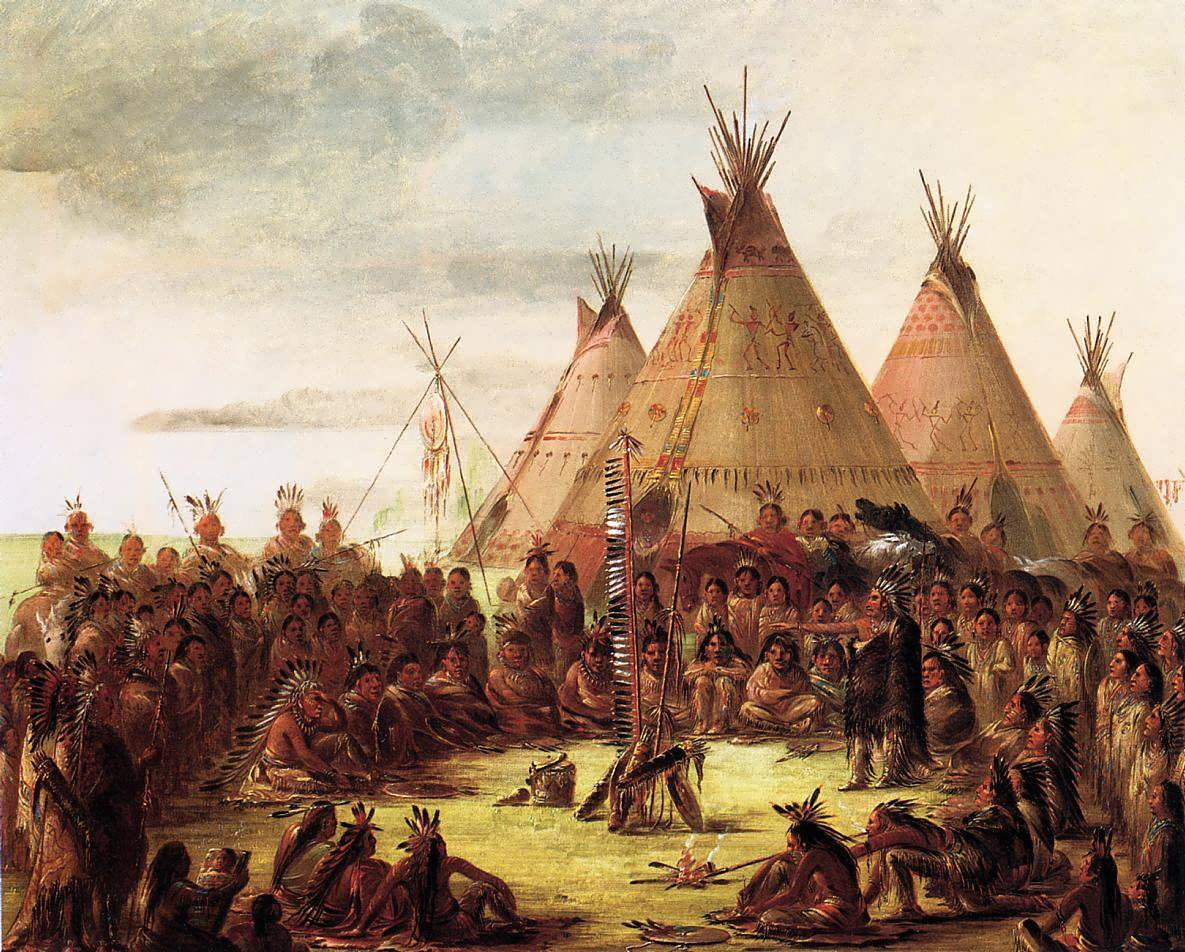
Tipis painted by George Catlin who visited a number of tribes in the 1830s and recorded Native American daily life

As a result of American westward expansion, the Utes now possess only a small fraction of the land that they once traveled seasonally. The Ute people consist of three populations of people:

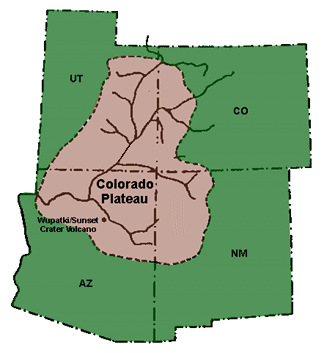
- Colorado Plateau
  Ute Indian Tribe of the Uintah and Ouray Reservation near Fort Duchesne in northeastern Utah.
- The Southern Ute live on a reservation in southwestern Colorado near Ignacio.
- The Ute Mountain Ute Tribe headquartered in Towaoc, Colorado, the subjects of this article.

=== Colonial Spain in America ===
The Mesa Verde Region, the present day area containing the Ute Mountain Ute Tribe reservation and the Mesa Verde National Park, was the northernmost edge of the colonial territory of Spain. Initial exploration of the American Southwest by the Spanish occurred in 1540, but Spaniards didn't settle into present day New Mexico until 1598. They established their first capital near the pueblo of Ohkay Owingeh, which they renamed San Juan de los Caballeros.

In 1626 an account was taken of the Utes by a Spanish scribe in New Mexico. About 1640 the Utes began trading with the Spanish for horses. Spanish traders followed trails to Ute villages and Utes traveled to New Mexican towns. The Utes brought buckskin, dried meats, furs, and slaves to exchange for horses, knives, and blankets. Spanish officials negotiate the first peace treaty with the Utes in 1670. In search of gold, Juan de Rivera made three expeditions between 1761 and 1765 from Taos through southwestern Colorado to the Gunnison River. He did not return with gold, but did establish trade with Utes and other Native Americans along the Gunnison River.

On July 29, 1776 two Franciscan priests, Francisco Atanasio Domínguez and Silvestre Vélez de Escalante and eight men left Santa Fe to conduct an expedition through Ute territory to find a route to Spanish missions in California. They traveled through western Colorado and Utah, documenting the "lush, mountainous land filled with game and timber, strange ruins of stone cities and villages, and rivers showing signs of precious metals." Beset by hunger and illness, the men turned back at Salt Lake Valley and returned to Santa Fe. The maps and information provided from the expedition provided useful information for future travel and their route from Santa Fe to the Salt Lake Valley became known as the Old Spanish Trail.

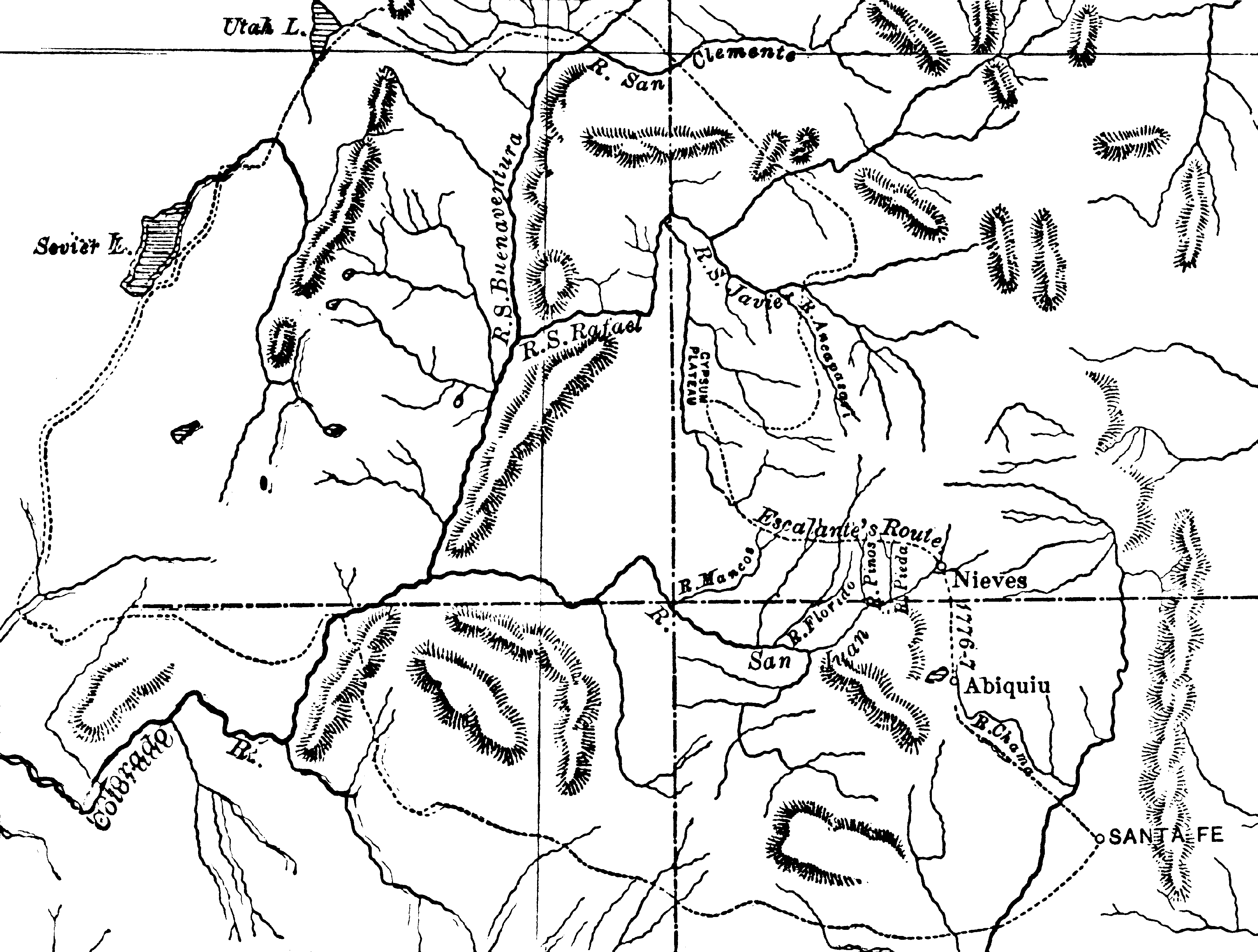
Domínguez and Escalante route, 1776

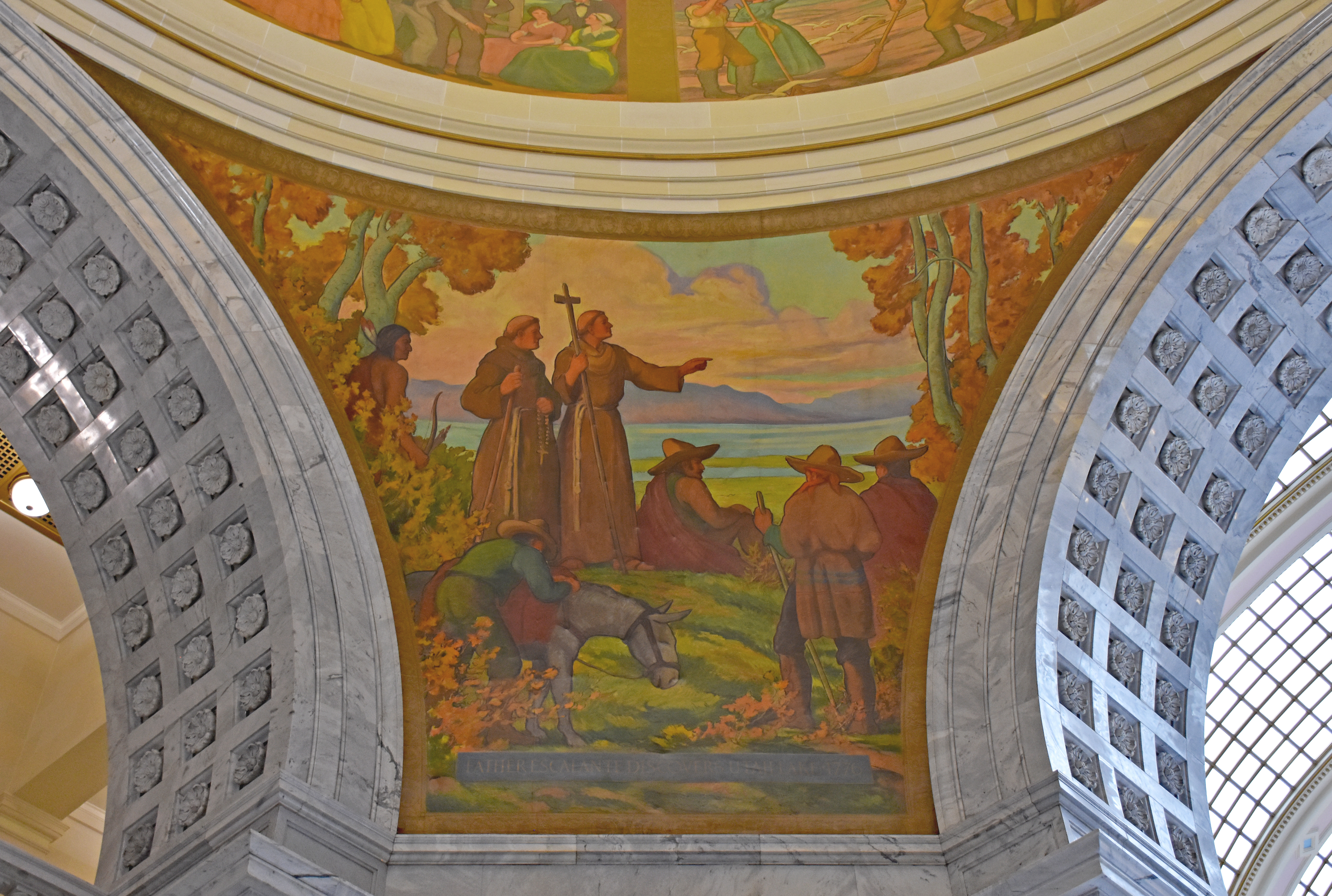
Mural of Fathers Dominguez and Escalante, Utah State capital building

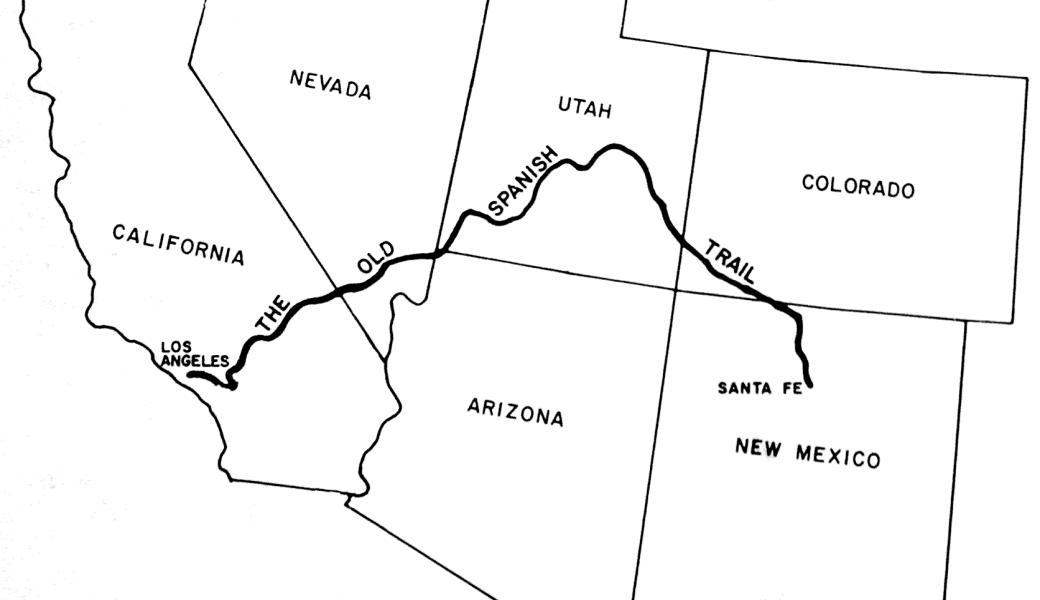
Old Spanish Trail (trade route)

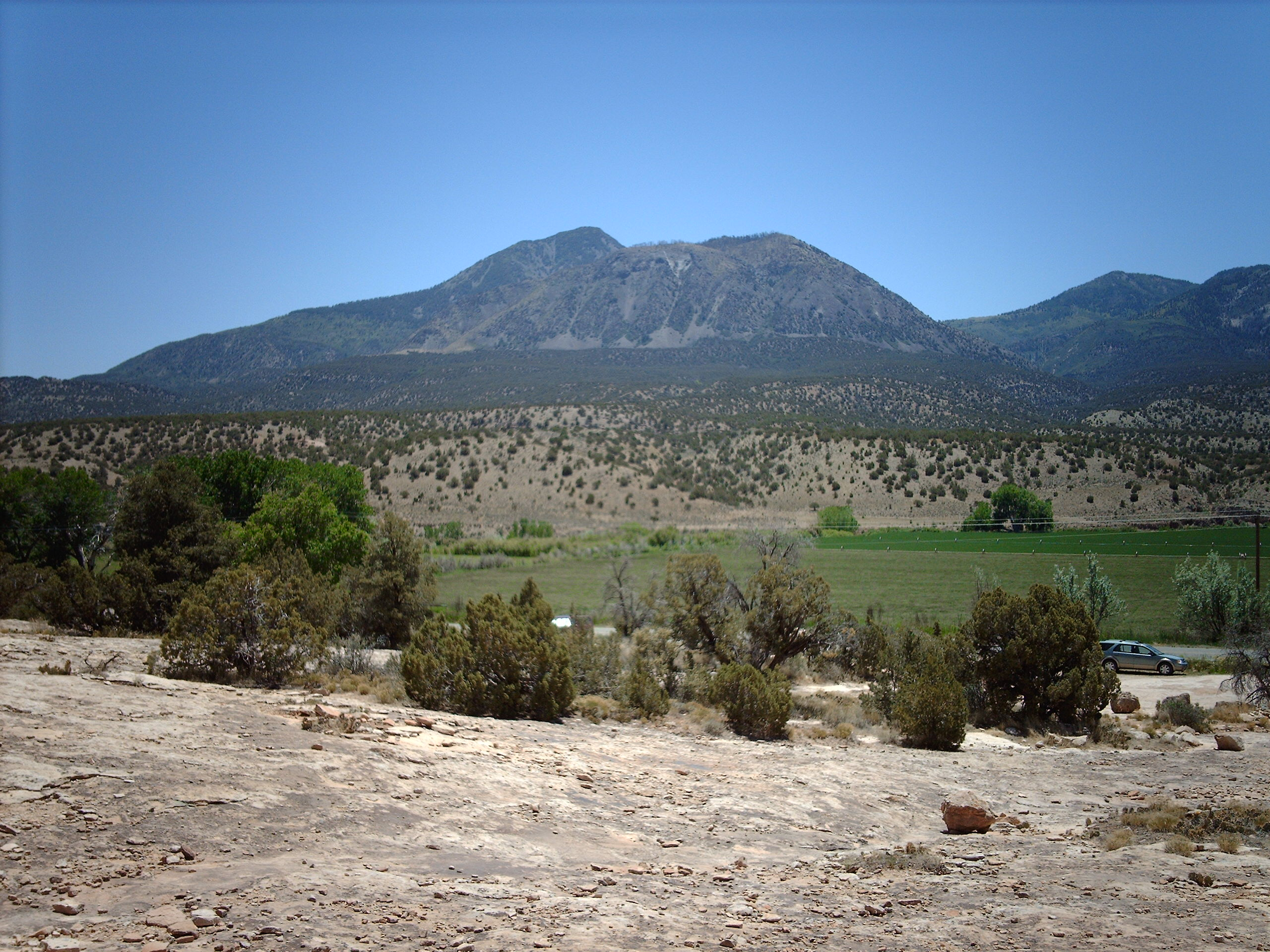
Ute Mountain, of the Sleeping Ute Mountain range

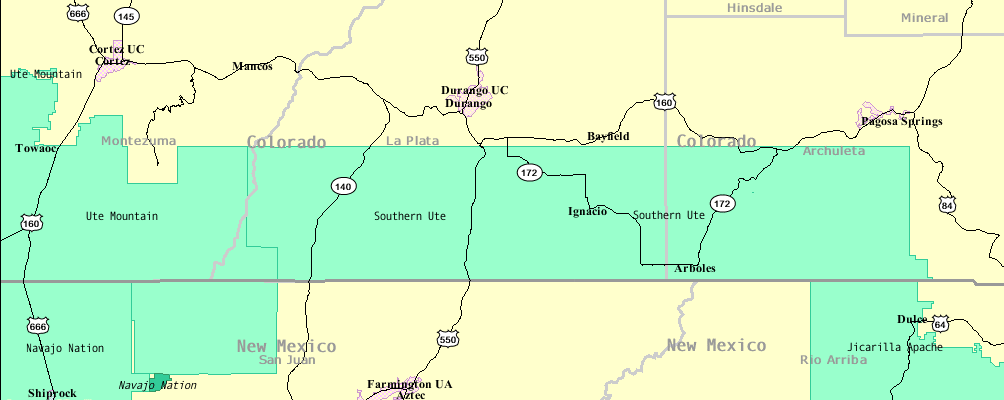
Map of Ute Mountain Ute, Southern Ute and Navajo reservations in southern Colorado and northern New Mexico

The Adams–Onís Treaty of 1819 established an official boundary line between Spanish and United States possessions in the southwest. Spanish territory included the southern plains, a large part of the western Rocky Mountains, and the entire western plateau region of Colorado. Even with the boundary, the Spanish did little to maintain their northern borders. When Mexico gained its independence from Spain, the Spanish lands became Mexican land.

=== American westward expansion ===
American fur trappers headed into the western frontier in 1811 and encountered the Utes. The Santa Fe Trail was opened in 1821 by William Bucknell; passage of goods through Ute territory became common. William Bent and Ceran St. Vrain complete Bent's Fort in 1834 on the Arkansas River, a trading stop along the Santa Fe trail.

In 1848 the Treaty of Guadalupe Hidalgo ends the Mexican–American War and New Mexico and southern Colorado are ceded to the United States. The next year, the first United States treaty is made with Utes made at Abiquiú, New Mexico; Utes acknowledge United States authority and the United States agrees to pay the Utes $5,000 per year to keep the peace. Americans recruited Southern Utes to aid them in conflicts with the Navajos, which the Ute saw as an economic need. In 1868 both the Navajo and Ute tribes were removed to reservations.

As more Americans moved into the western frontier, conflicts arose with the establishment of forts, reduction in land and access to ancient hunting and gathering grounds, and significant reduction in the Ute population from disease and malnutrition. In 1868 Utes are confined to western third of Colorado Territory by treaty. In 1873 the gold and silver rush occurred in San Juan Mountains; the Utes cede the San Juan mining area to the United States, it is one-fourth of their remaining lands. In the 1870s, Utes were pushed to the western part of the state of Colorado and held just a small portion of their land in Utah. Between 1859 and 1879 the Ute population fell from 8,000 to 2,000 due to disease and diminished hunting grounds.

Colorado Mineral Belt

In 1880, a year after the Meeker Massacre, a Ute delegation, including Chief Ouray, went to Washington, D.C. to negotiate a treaty. In 1888 the United States takes more Ute lands, paying $50,000 to be divided among the Southern Utes. In 1895 the Hunter Act repeals 1888 treaties and establishes permanent reservation as outlined by 1880 treaties. The following year land allotments are distributed to Southern Utes. The tribe moved to the western end of the Southern Ute Reservation in 1897 (they were led by Chief Ignacio, for whom the eastern capital is named). In 1906 an agreement was made to trade Utes out of Mesa Verde National Park for land on Utah border. In 1905 the U.S. Government allotted new reservations with 80 to 160 acre plats for farming and access to communal grazing areas; This reduced the Ute land holdings by more than 85%, limited water access and limited the viability of successful livestock ranching. The remainder of the land was opened for white entry. In 1918 the Consolidated Ute Indian Reservation is established.

By 1934, a reservation is established in southwestern Colorado for Southern Utes, an arid, desolate strip of land 15 by 100 or 110 miles. In 1937 the Restoration Act returns 222,000 acres to Southern Utes. 30,000 acres were returned to Ute Mountain Utes in 1938. The U.S. Court of Claims awards the Confederated Bands of Colorado and Utah almost $32 million in 1950.

== Tribal government ==
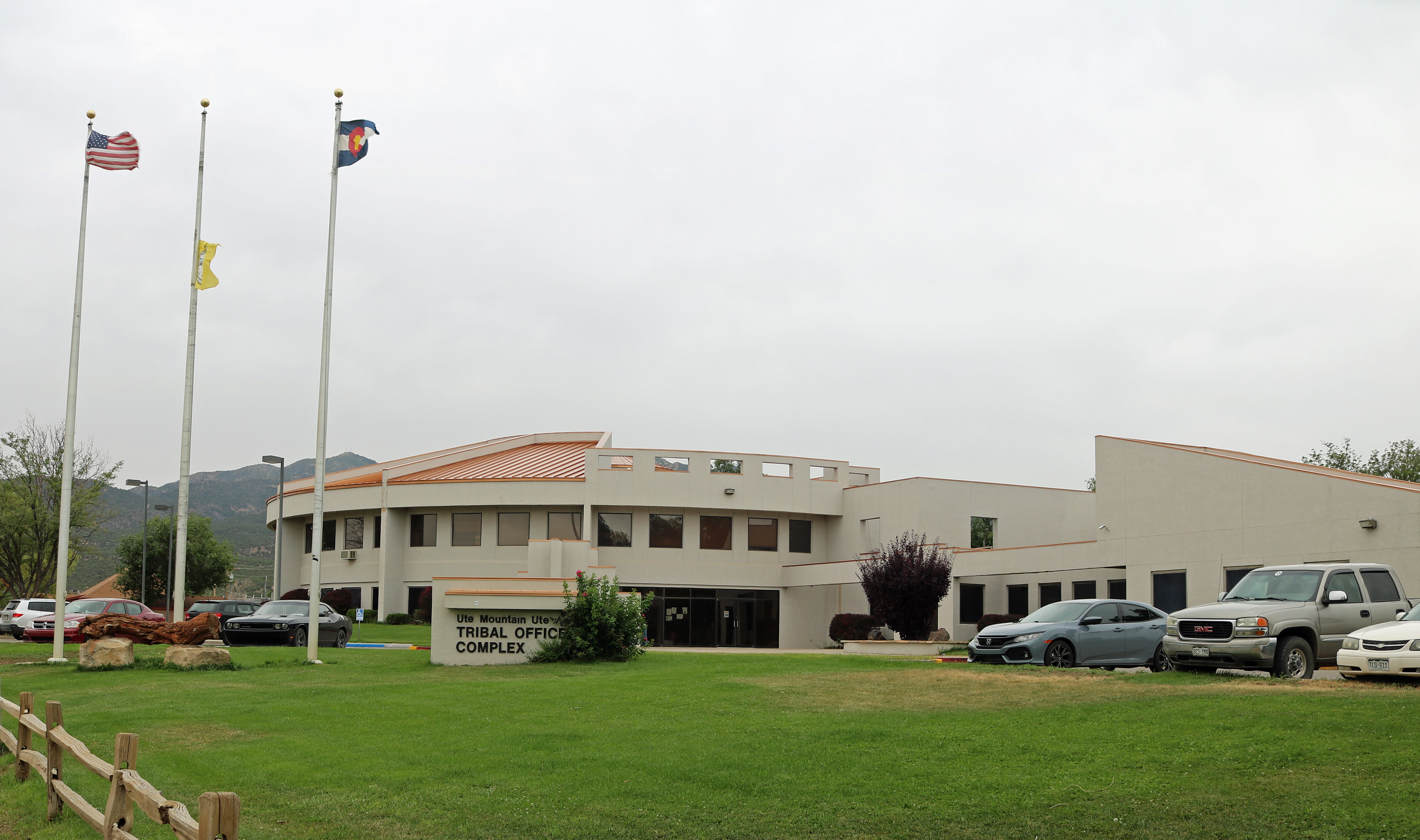
The Ute Mountain Ute Tribal Office Complex

The Ute Mountain Utes adopted a constitution in 1940. In 1990 the tribe had 1,262 enrolled members.

== Reservation ==
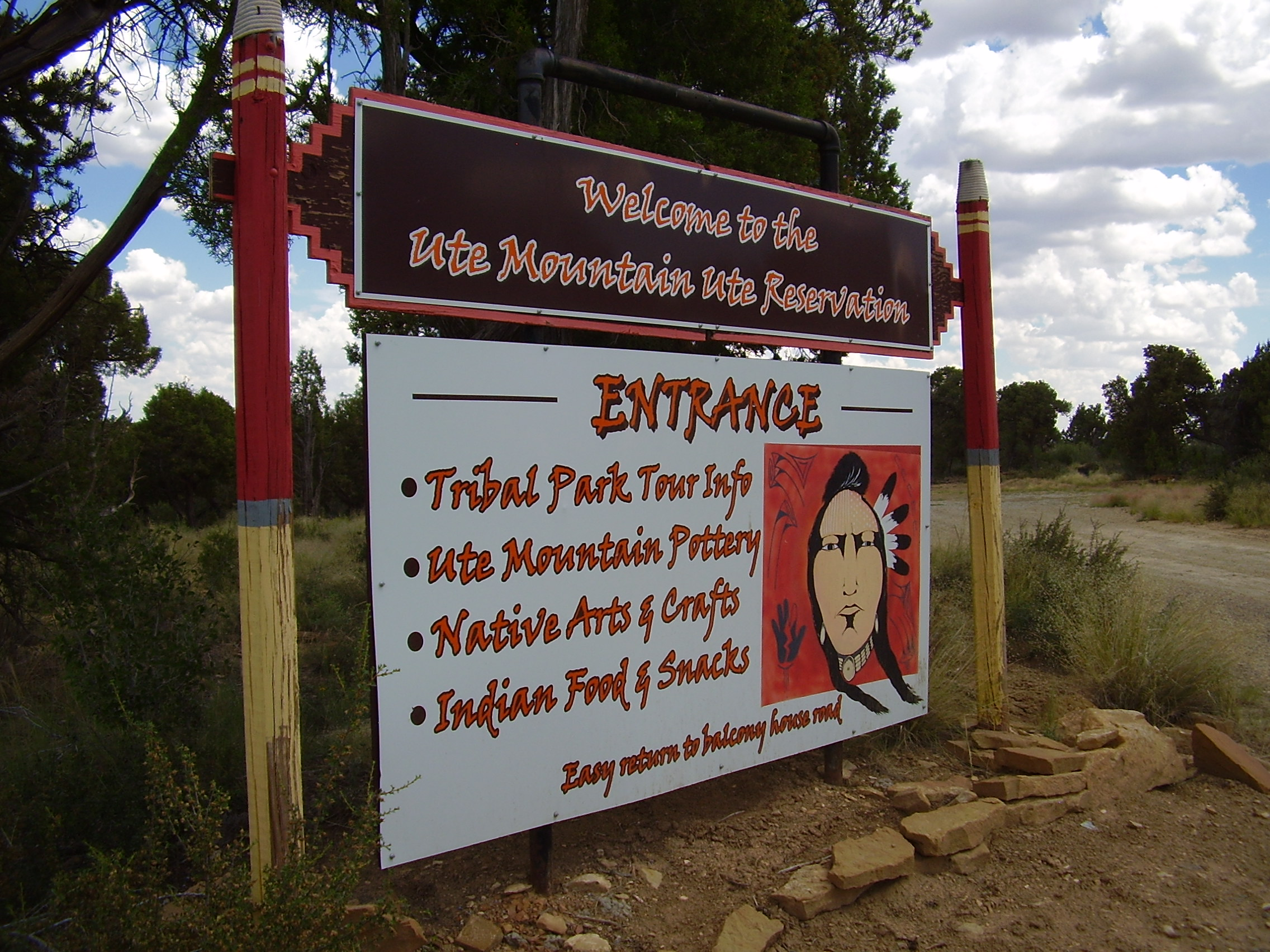
Ute Mountain Ute Indian Reservation

The Ute Mountain Ute Indian Reservation (37°06′14″N 108°39′46″W) is located in southwestern Colorado and northwestern New Mexico consisting of 553,008 acres belonging to the Ute Mountain Ute Tribe, but held in trust by the U.S. Government. The reservation is located in the counties of Montezuma and La Plata in Colorado and San Juan County, New Mexico. There are also individually owned lands at Allen Canyon and White Mesa totally 8,499 acres (3,439 ha), and 40 acres (16 ha) of school property, in San Juan County, Utah. Most of the people on the reservation live in the town of Towaoc which is also the site of the Ute Mountain Indian Agency.

The elevation of the reservation varies from about 4,600 feet (1,400 m) along the San Juan River near Four Corners to about 9,977 feet (3,041 m) at the peak of the Ute Mountain. The reservation lands consist of Sleeping Ute Mountain, the Mancos River and canyons, a high mesas and semi-desert grassland. U.S. Highways 160 and 491 and State Highways 41 and 789 cross the reservation. In addition, there are two maintained gravel roads, one that follows the Mancos River Canyon and another from Towaoc to the Cache oilfield and Aneth, Utah, and off-road trails.

The population was 1,687 as of the 2000 census.

== Ute Mountain Tribal Park ==
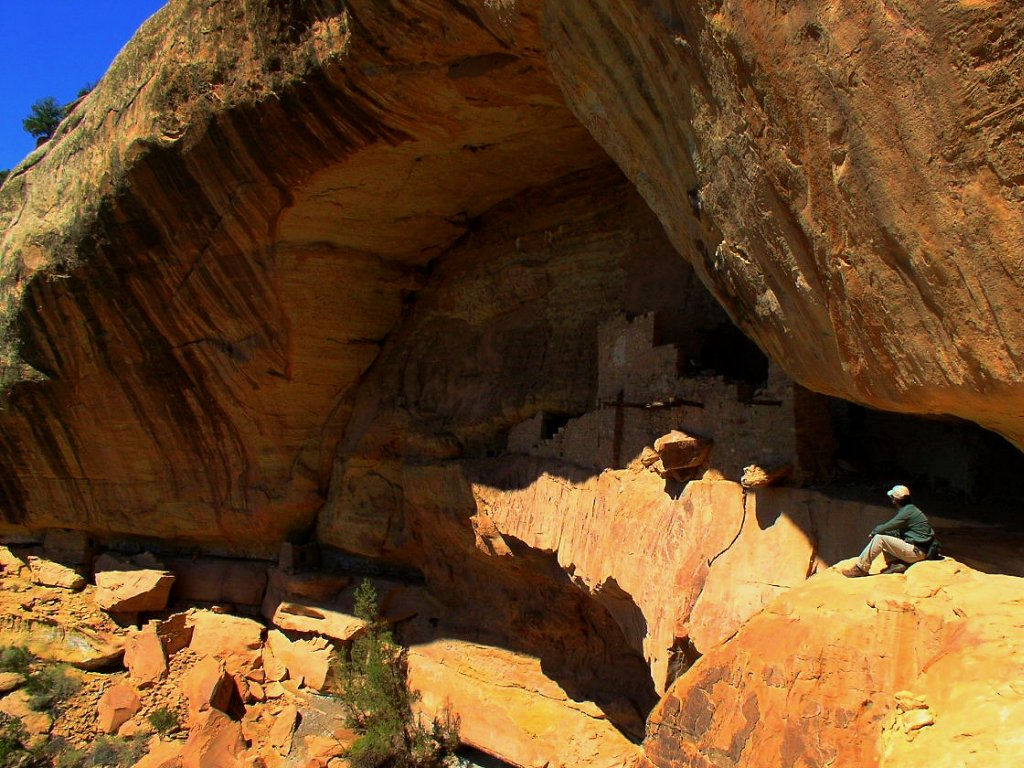
Eagle's Nest pueblo in Ute Mountain Tribal Park

The Ute Mountain Tribal Park, part of the Ute Mountain Ute Indian Reservation, is approximately 125,000 acres (51,000 ha) of land along the Mancos River. Hundreds of surface sites, cliff dwellings, petroglyphs and wall paintings of Ancestral Puebloan and Ute cultures are preserved in the park. Native American Ute tour guides provide background information about the people, culture and history who lived in the park lands. National Geographic Traveler chose it as one of "80 World Destinations for Travel in the 21st Century," one of only 9 places selected in the United States.

== Notable people ==
In 1880 Chief Ouray went to Washington, D.C., as part of the Ute delegation to negotiate a treaty. He made it to Washington, but died that year at 47 years of age. Chief Jack House, the last traditional chief of the Utes, died in 1971.

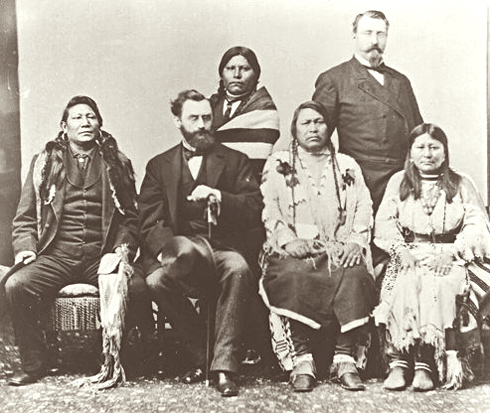
From left to right: Chief Ignacio of the Southern Utes, Carl Shurz, U.S. Secretary of the Interior, Chief Ouray and his wife, Chipeta. Woretsiz and General Charles Adams (Colorado Indian agent) are standing. Taken in Washington, D.C., in 1880 when a Ute Indian delegation negotiated a treaty with the U.S. government. Photograph by Mathew Brady.

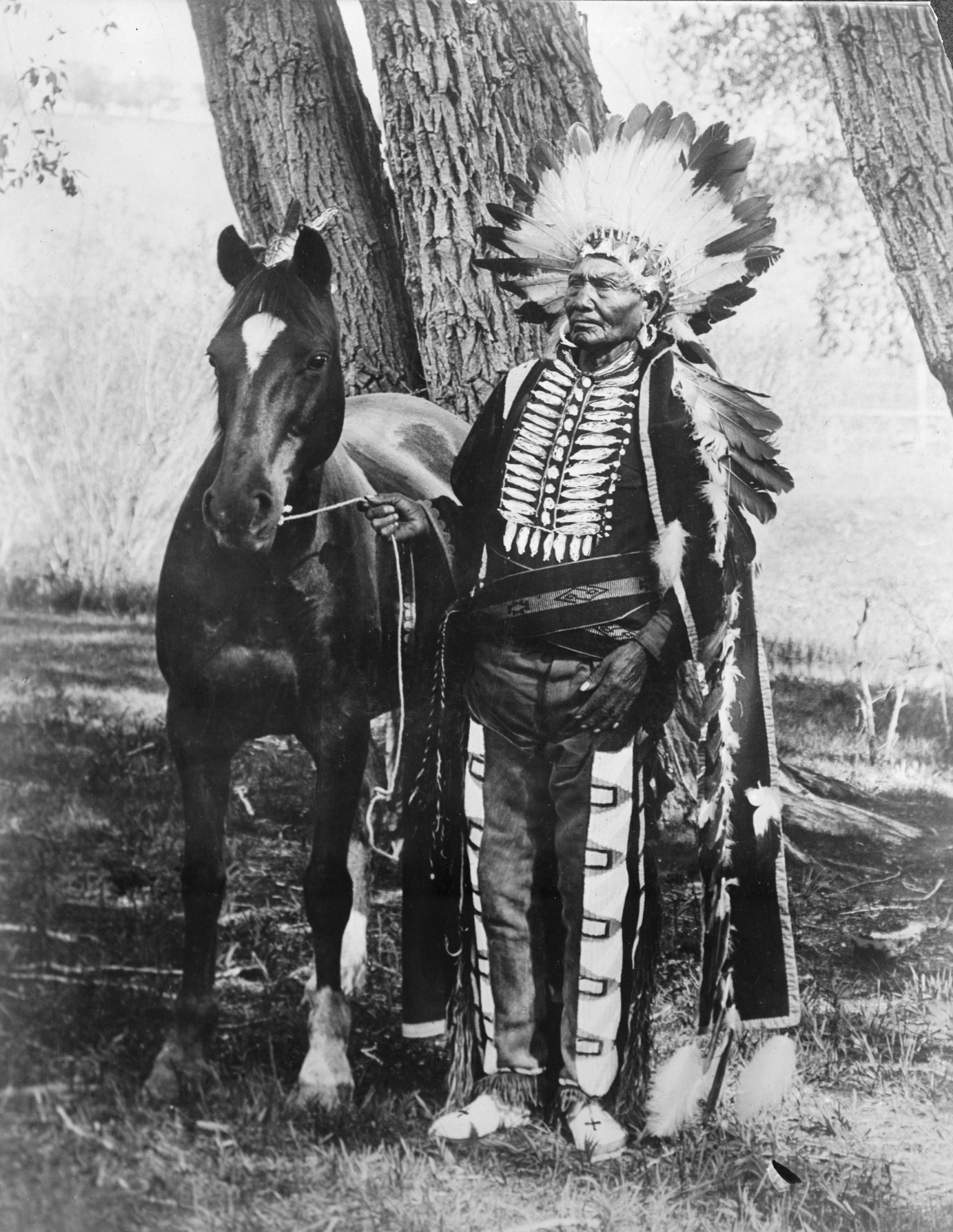
Chief Ignacio, 1904
