= Ernest R. House =

American academic

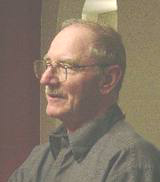
- Ernest R. House in 1998
- Born: August 7, 1937 (age 89); Alton, Illinois
- Spouse: Mary Donna Brown

Ernest R. House is an American academic specializing in program evaluation and education policy. He has been a professor emeritus of Education at the University of Colorado Boulder since 2002. House was a faculty member at the University of Colorado Boulder from 1985 to 2001. Before that, he was a professor of education at the University of Illinois at Urbana-Champaign from 1969 to 1985. He has been a visiting scholar at UCLA, Harvard, University of New Mexico, and the Center for Advanced Study in the Behavioral Sciences (1999–2000), and also in England, Australia, Spain, Sweden, Austria, and Chile.

With Ronald Wooldridge, he was editor-in-chief of the journal New Directions for Program Evaluation (the journal of the Evaluation Research Society) from 1982 to 1985.

== Education ==
House graduated from Washington University in St. Louis with a bachelor's degree in English in 1959. He earned a master's degree in secondary education from Southern Illinois University in 1964, and completed a doctorate (Ed.D.) from the University of Illinois at Urbana-Champaign in 1968.

== Awards and honors ==
- Phi Beta Kappa
- Ford Foundation Fellow (England), 1975.
- Harold E. Lasswell Prize (with William Madura) presented by Policy Sciences (1989).
- Paul Lazarsfeld Award for Evaluation Theory, for lifetime contributions to evaluation research and theory, awarded by, 1990.
- Fellow, Center for Advanced Study in the Behavioral Sciences, Palo Alto, CA, 1999–2000

== Books ==
- The Politics of Educational Innovation (1974)
- Survival in the Classroom (with S. Lapan, 1978)
- Evaluating with Validity (1980, re-issued 2010)
- Jesse Jackson and the Politics of Charisma: The Rise and Fall of the Push/Excel Program (1988)
- Professional Evaluation: Social Impact and Political Consequences (1993)
- Schools for Sale: Why Free Market Policies Won't Improve America's Schools, and What Will (1998)
- Values in Evaluation and Social Research (with K. Howe, 1999)
- Regression to the Mean: A Novel of Evaluation Politics (2007)
- Cherry Street Alley (2015)
- Evaluating: Values, Biases, and Practical Wisdom (2014)
