= Birger Sandzén =

Swedish-born American painter

Sven Birger Sandzén
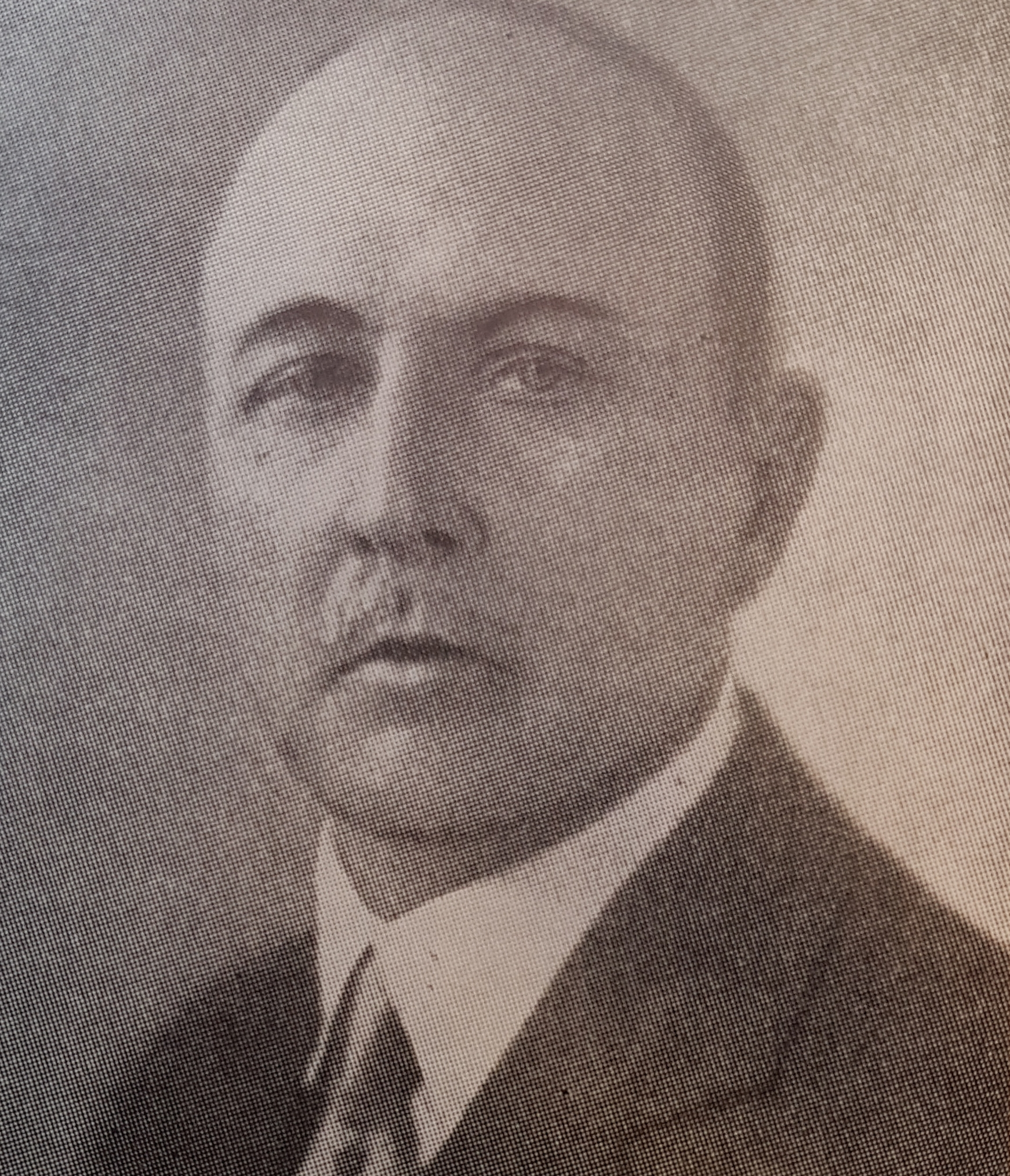
- Born: February 5, 1871; Blidsberg, Ulricehamn Municipality, Västra Götaland County, Sweden.
- Died: June 22, 1954 (aged 83); Lindsborg, Kansas, U.S.
- Education: Lund University; Katedralskolan, Skara
- Known for: Painting
- Movement: Post-impressionism

Sven Birger Sandzén (February 5, 1871 – June 22, 1954), known more commonly as Birger Sandzén, was a Swedish-American painter best known for his landscapes. He produced most of his work while working as an art professor at Bethany College, Lindsborg, Kansas.

== Background ==
Sandzén was born in Blidsberg, Ulricehamn Municipality, Västra Götaland County, Sweden. His parents were Johan Petter Sandzén and Clara Carolina Elisabeth Sylvén. His father was a parish priest and his mother an accomplished watercolorist. A protégé of Anders Zorn, Sandzén showed an interest in art from an early age, and at the age of 10 joined Skara Cathedral School (Katedralskolan), to study art under the tutelage of Olof Erlandsson (1845-1916), a graduate of the Royal Swedish Academy of Arts.

After graduating in 1890, Sandzén studied for a short time at the University of Lund before moving to Stockholm. It was his intention to enroll at the Royal Swedish Academy of Arts. However, the waiting list proved too long for him. Instead, he sought out and joined a group of young artists who were studying under Anders Zorn, Richard Bergh and Per Hasselberg. This group would later be known as the Artists' Association (Konstnärsförbundet). One of his fellow students and ultimately a good friend, was Carl Lotave.

At the end of his studies, Zorn and Bergh recommended that Sandzén complete his painting studies in Paris. In 1894, Sandzén left Stockholm to study under Edmond Aman-Jean who introduced Sandzén to pointillism. Aman-Jean was closely associated with Ernest Laurent and Georges Seurat in promoting impressionism. Sandzén's early work displays these influences, along with a tonalist approach.

== Career ==
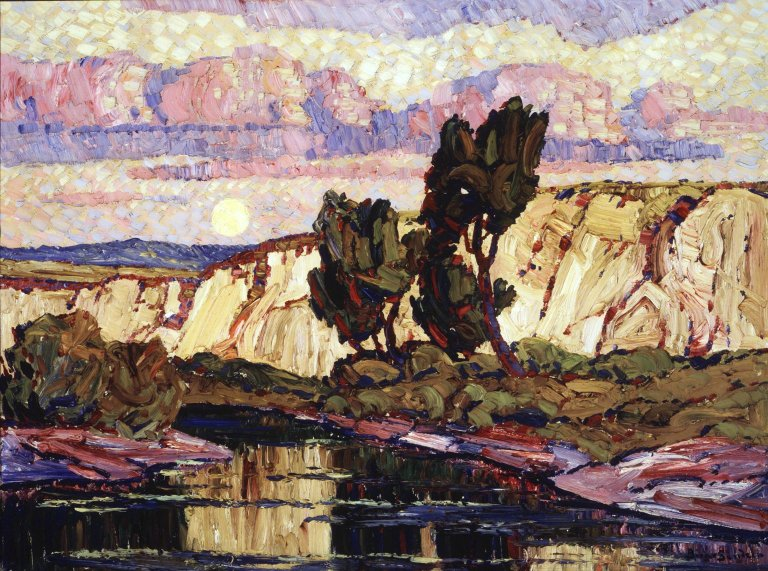
Creek at Moonrise (ca. 1921)

Later in 1894, Sandzén accepted a teaching post from Carl Aaron Swensson, President of Bethany College. He moved to Lindsborg, Kansas which would be his home for the rest of his life. He remained on the faculty for fifty-two years, teaching various languages as well as art in his first year at Bethany. Sandzén would go on to become the head of art at the college until his retirement in 1946. He recommended that his friend Carl Lotave fill an open position at Bethany and with Lotave and N.G. Malm, they started the first exhibition of Swedish-American art. It became the annual Midwest Art Exhibition.

Sandzén was taken with the Smoky Hill River Valley area of central Kansas, which provided much of the subject matter for his paintings. Many of his paintings feature the great landscapes of the American Southwest. Sandzén painted many landscape scenes, including depictions of the Rocky Mountain National Park and Yellowstone National Park, both favorite venues for his work. He also spent considerable time painting landscapes within Kansas. According to curator Bill North, he frequently painted landscapes from Graham County, Kansas, where his wife's parents moved in 1906.

Although most of his works are in oil, Sandzén was also a talented printmaker and watercolorist Sandzén was highly prolific producing at least 2,890 oil paintings as well as hundreds of different prints and watercolors and drawings. He adopted a thick, textural, impasto style of painting, with the use of strong colourful brushstrokes. His bold use of stroke and color has been described variously as post-Impressionism, expressionism and fauvism. His woodcuts and linocuts were to have a lasting effect on artists to come. His artwork has been compared to Vincent van Gogh and Paul Cézanne.

== Personal life ==
In 1897, Sandzén met Alfrida Leksell, a Bethany College piano student from McPherson, Kansas. They married in 1900 and had one child, Margarita Elizabeth Greenough (1909–1993). Margarita spent a year in Paris with Myra Biggerstaff studying fine art. Birgir Sandzén spent 60 of his 83 years of life in the United States, and was a naturalized American citizen. He died in 1954 in Lindsborg, Kansas.

== Legacy ==
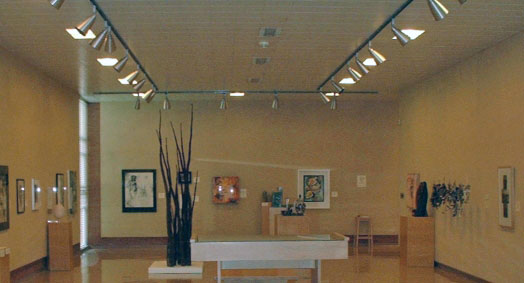
Birger Sandzén Memorial Gallery, Lindsborg, Kansas

In 1940, Sandzén was given recognition for promoting cultural relations between the United States and Sweden. He was awarded both the Order of Vasa as well as the Order of the North Star by the Swedish Government. He also received honorary doctorates from various institutions, including the Midland Lutheran College, the University of Nebraska, and the Kansas State University.

As a tribute to Sandzén's contribution to Bethany College, the Birger Sandzén Memorial Gallery was dedicated on the college campus in 1957. It houses paintings and archives related to Sandzén and a number of his contemporaries. Also, as part of the regional interest two of Sandzen's paintings are held by the Beach Museum of Art at Kansas State University. The paintings Still Water and Fall in the Mountains were two of the first acquisitions by the museum. There are also two oil paintings by Birger Sandzen in the Western Art Museum, Anschutz Collection in Denver, Colorado.

== Galleries and public collections ==
- Steven Stern Fine Arts (California)
- William A. Karges Fine Art
- George Stern Fine Arts (California)
- David Dee Fine Arts (Utah)
- Lawrence Beebe Fine Art (California)
- Roughton Galleries (Texas)
- Birger Sandzen Memorial Gallery
- Beach Museum of Art
- Ponca City Municipal Library, Ponca City, Oklahoma (https://www.poncacityok.gov/232/Matzene-Art-Collection)
- Mark Arts, Wichita, Kansas
- Denver Museum of Art, Denver, Colorado
- The Broadmoor Resort, Colorado Springs, Colorado
- Vanderpoel Art Museum (Chicago, Illinois)
