= Bethany College (Kansas) =

Liberal arts college in Lindsborg, Kansas, US

- Type: Private college
- Established: 1881; 145 years ago
- Religious affiliation: Evangelical Lutheran Church in America (ELCA)
- Academic affiliations: NAICU
- President: Laura Crawley
- Students: 600
- Undergraduates: 600
- Location: Lindsborg, Kansas, United States; 38°34′48.2″N 97°40′22.7″W
- Campus: Rural, 53 acres (21 ha)
- Colors: Blue and gold
- Sporting affiliations: NAIA – KCAC
- Mascot: Swedes
- Website: bethanylb.edu

Bethany College is a private Christian college in Lindsborg, Kansas, United States. It was founded in 1881, making it one of the oldest colleges in Kansas.

== History ==
Bethany College, established by Swedish Lutheran immigrants in 1881, is a college of the Evangelical Lutheran Church in America (ELCA). Swedish-Lutheran settlers worked with the Rev. Carl Aaron Swensson, pastor of Bethany Lutheran Church, to establish "Bethany Academy" on October 15, 1881, in the sacristy of the church in Lindsborg, Kansas, with ten students.

The first building erected contained classrooms and a dormitory for men. A separate dormitory for women was built next. J. A. Udden was the first teacher. In 1882, the Smoky Valley district of the Kansas conference of the Augustana Synod took responsibility for the college; a board of directors was appointed and a state charter was received.

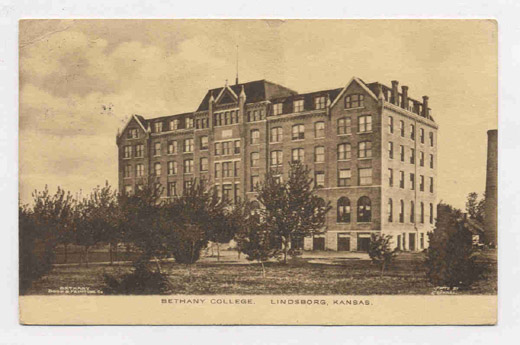
Bethany College at the turn of the twentieth century

In 1883, a large dormitory for men was constructed, and in 1885, a main hall with classrooms, a chapel museum, and library and science departments opened. The Kansas conference itself took responsibility for the school in the spring of 1885 and the name was changed to "Bethany College and Normal Institute". By 1889, its present name, Bethany College, had been assumed and it had been granted permission to award academic degrees.

Notable Bethany presidents in the 20th century include Ernst Frederick Wilhelm Pihlblad, who was a professor from 1895 to 1904 and president from 1905 to 1941. Under Pihlblad, Bethany was accredited and became a member of the National Association of Schools of Music. Under Emory K. Lindquist, who took office of president in 1943, Bethany survived war troubles, grew in post-war America, and improved its reputation. He was the author of Bethany in Kansas: The History of a College (1975).

The Bethany College Board of Directors announced the appointment of Elizabeth Mauch as Bethany College President in 2020.

== Academics ==
Bethany College has 14 academic departments. The school offers majors focused in education, humanities, fine arts, sciences, and social sciences; minors ranging from business and sacred music to theater and art; teaching endorsements for all majors in education; and six pre-professional studies including medicine, law and, physical therapy.

== Traditions ==
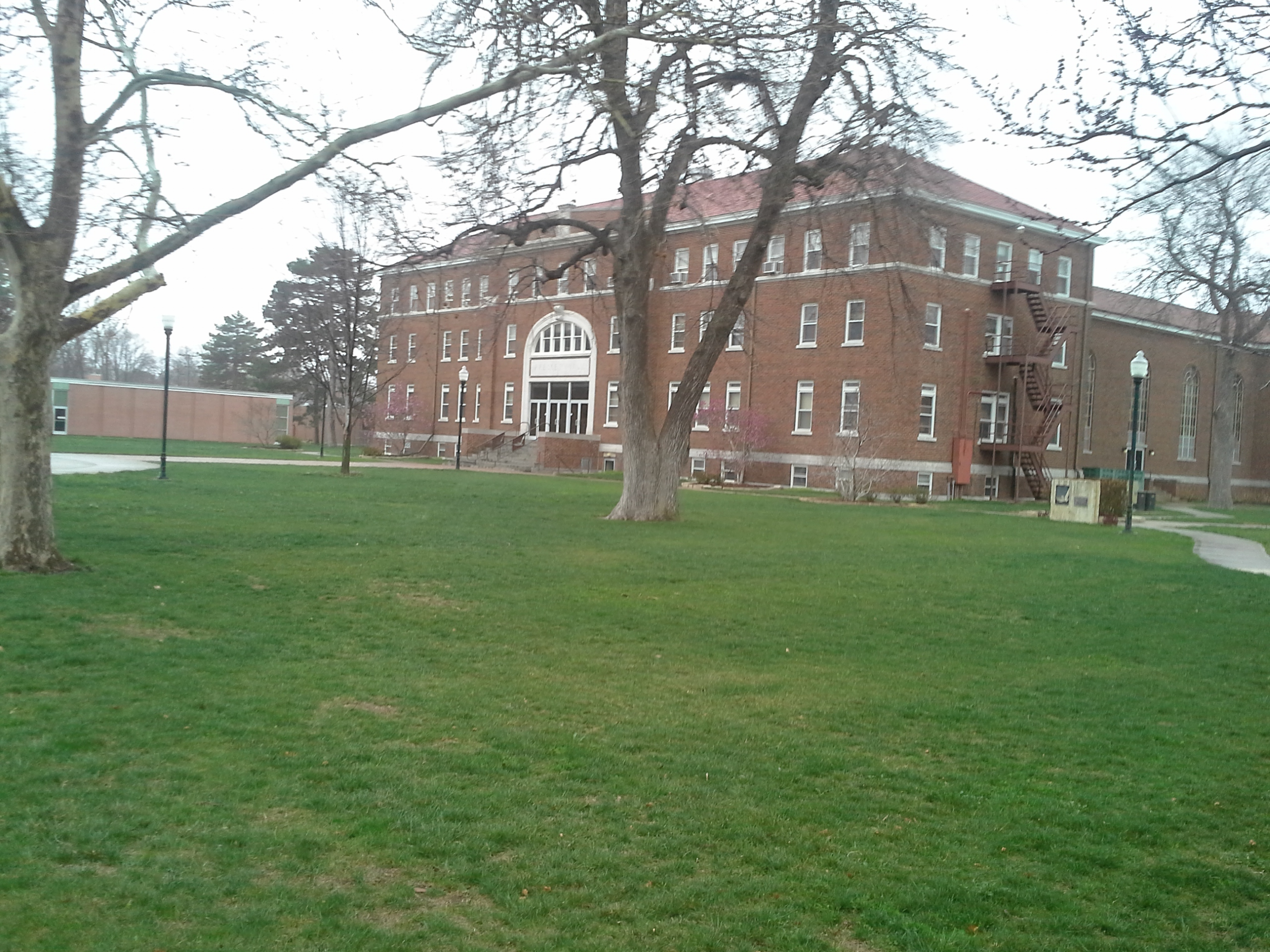
Main building

- Since 1903, students and alumni have rallied Bethany athletic competition with the "Rockar! Stockar!" cheer.
- Every year since 1882, Bethany Oratorio Society has presented Handel's Messiah at the college, one of the longest-running annual performances in North America.
- The walk from Bethany Lutheran Church. In honor of its founding in the sacristy of Bethany Lutheran Church, students traditionally walk to the church for a welcome service on their first day at Bethany as freshmen. Then, before the baccalaureate services on the day of their commencement, Bethany seniors line up in front of Bethany Lutheran Church for a traditional procession to Presser Hall on campus.
- The ringing of the bell. When a Swedes athletics team wins conference, they gather in front of Hahn Gymnasium to ring the bell and spread the news to the rest of the campus, regardless of what time of day—or night—it may be.
- Lift High the Cross. Each year during Homecoming week, Bethany students celebrate the college’s heritage of faith by lifting high a wooden cross in the gazebo. Students sign up for shifts so that the cross is held high during every hour of the week.
- The number of feet out that the fence is for a home run in Anderson Stadium is 352, and it is also the place all Swedes baseball fans gather to cheer.

== Athletics ==
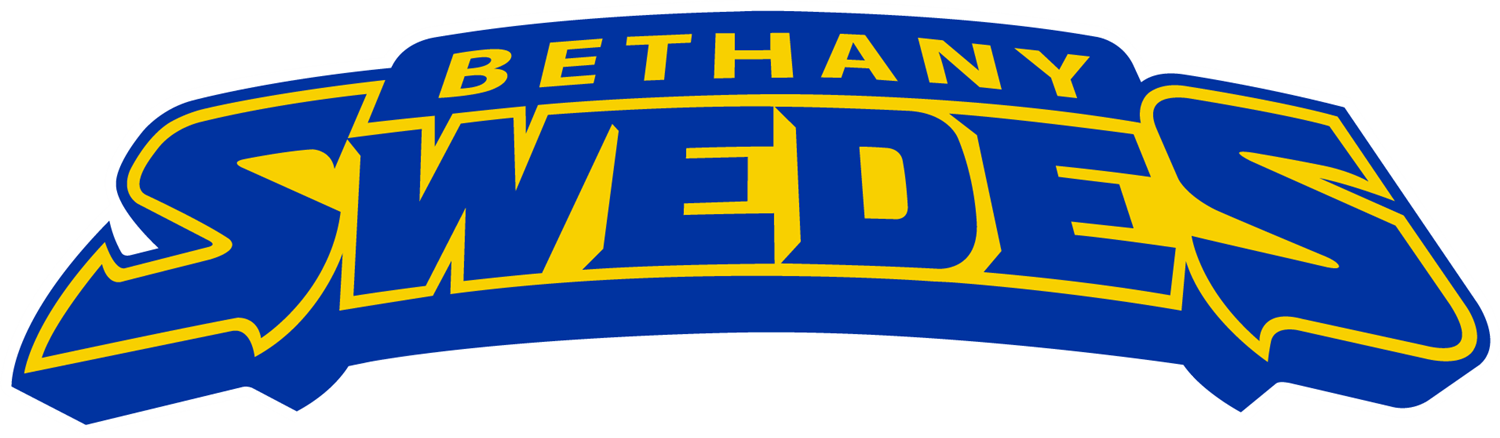
Bethany athletics wordmark

The Bethany athletic teams are called the Swedes (or Terrible Swedes). The college is a member of the National Association of Intercollegiate Athletics (NAIA), primarily competing in the Kansas Collegiate Athletic Conference (KCAC) since the 1902–03 academic year.

Bethany competes in 22 intercollegiate varsity sports: men's sports include baseball, basketball, cross country, football, golf, soccer, tennis, track & field (indoor and outdoor) and wrestling; while women's sports include basketball, cross country, golf, soccer, softball, tennis, track & field (indoor and outdoor) and volleyball; and co-ed sports include eSports.

== Notable alumni and faculty ==
- Randy W. Berry, United States Ambassador to Namibia
- Myra Biggerstaff, artist
- John Frykman, Lutheran minister and psychotherapist
- Oscar Jacobson, B.A., Ph.D., painter and director of the University of Oklahoma School of Art, now known as the Fred Jones Jr. Museum of Art
- Lewis L. Johnson, member of the Wisconsin State Assembly
- Harrison Keller, violinist and professor
- Ted Kessinger, football coach and College Football Hall of Fame inductee
- Emory Lindquist, 1930 Rhodes Scholar, Swedish-American historian, President of Bethany College, President of Wichita State University
- Carl Lotave, art instructor and portraitist
- Bruce Montgomery, composer, performer, painter, conductor, director
- Wade Moore, baseball manager and college football coach
- Bennie Owen, football coach and College Football Hall of Fame inductee
- John Pfeiffer, classical music producer
- Norman Reedus, actor (attended a semester)
- Milt Rehnquist, attended 1919 to 1922, was named to the All-Kansas Conference team and played in the National Football League
- Birger Sandzen, artist, art professor at Bethany College
- Carl Aaron Swensson, Lutheran minister and President of Bethany College
- Norma Wendelburg, composer
- Evelyn Wilson, Justice of the Kansas Supreme Court
- Sue Jean Covacevich, landscape artist
