= Smoky Hills =

Region in the United States

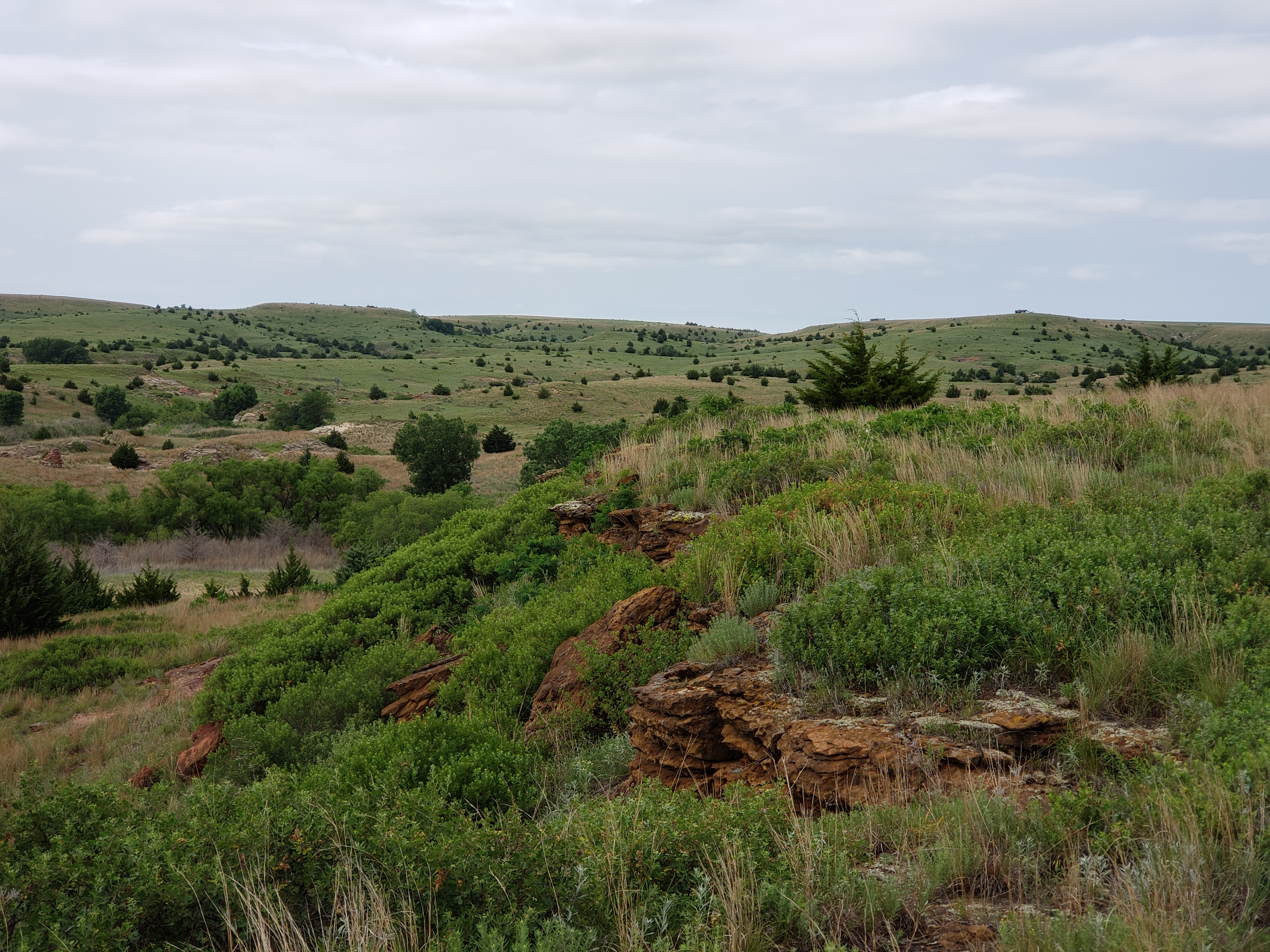

Geography
- Country: United States
- States: Kansas; Nebraska
- Region: Plains Border (subregion)
- Range coordinates: 38°47′30″N 97°59′51″W
- Parent range: Great Plains

Geology
- Rock age: Cretaceous

The Smoky Hills are an upland region of hills in the central Great Plains of North America. They are located in the Midwestern United States, encompassing north-central Kansas and a small portion of south-central Nebraska.

The hills are a dissected plain covered by tallgrass and mixed-grass prairie. The Smoky Hills were formed by erosion of sedimentary deposits from the Cretaceous period and expose chalk, limestone, and sandstone rock outcroppings.

== Geography ==
KDOT distance map color-coded by physiographic region showing the Smoky Hills (center)

The Smoky Hills region is part of the Plains Border subregion of the Great Plains. It occupies nearly all of north-central Kansas, bordered on the west by the High Plains, on the northeast by the Dissected Till Plains, on the east by the Flint Hills, and on the south by the Arkansas River lowlands. The region extends into south-central Nebraska, bordered on the north by the Rainwater Basin.

It consists of three belts of hills, all running southwest to northeast, which correspond to the underlying geological formations (see geology section). The Smoky Hills proper comprise the easternmost belt; the two western belts are known as the Blue Hills. The hills of the westernmost belt are also known as the Chalk Bluffs. The Blue Hills escarpment forms the boundary with the High Plains to the west.

The Environmental Protection Agency divides the region into two Temperate grasslands, savannas, and shrublands ecoregions: the Smoky Hills proper constituting the Smoky Hills Ecoregion in the east; and the Blue Hills and Chalk Bluffs constituting the Rolling Plains and Breaks Ecoregion in the west.

The Republican River, Saline River, Solomon River, and Smoky Hill River all flow eastward through the Smoky Hills from their sources in the High Plains. Beginning in the 1940s, the U.S. Army Corps of Engineers and the U.S. Bureau of Reclamation dammed these rivers at points in the Smoky Hills for flood control and irrigation purposes, creating several reservoirs. These include Cedar Bluff Reservoir, Kanopolis Lake, Kirwin Reservoir, Waconda Lake, Webster Reservoir, and Wilson Lake.

Land use in the Smoky Hills consists primarily of cropland and rangeland. The region is sparsely populated with numerous communities of varying size, but no large cities. The two largest communities in the Smoky Hills region are Salina, Kansas and Hays, Kansas.

Elevations in the Smoky Hills range from about 1,200 feet (370 m) in the river valley near Salina to about 2,400 feet (730 m) at the western edge of the region.

== Geology ==
The region is divided into three regions based on the underlying Cretaceous rock outcroppings: The Dakota Formation (sandstone), the Greenhorn Limestone, and the Niobrara Chalk.

The Dakota Formation forms the eastern region. This area includes the Smoky Hill Buttes, which are capped by sandstone and provide a sharp contrast with the surrounding plains. One of the most notable buttes is Coronado Heights in Saline County. Pawnee Rock was another Dakota Sandstone landmark in the region. There are concretions at Rock City in Ottawa County and Mushroom Rock State Park in Ellsworth County. These are cemented by calcium carbonate.

The Greenhorn Limestone region, Blue Hills or Kearney Hills, in the central region is made up of thin—usually less than 6 inches (15 cm)—chalky limestone beds alternating with thicker beds of blue-gray chalky shale. This area is known as post rock country due to the practice of early settlers using limestone for buildings and fenceposts since trees were scarce.

The Chalk Hills are the beds of the Niobrara Chalk exposed in Fort Hays Limestone bluffs of the western Solomon, Saline, Smoky Hill, and Republican Rivers, and in an irregular belt of Smoky Hill Chalk bluffs further west. This area includes such Kansas landmarks as Castle Rock and Monument Rocks in Gove County. The chalk beds are known for the late 19th and early 20th century excavations of exceptionally well-preserved fossils of marine reptiles such as the plesiosaurs and mosasaurs found in the uppermost member of the Niobrara Chalk, the Smoky Hill Chalk.

== Wildlife ==
The mixed-grass prairie of this region hosts a large variety of wildlife species. Coyotes, mule deer, northern myotis bats, the eastern spotted skunk, and some kangaroo rats live in the Smoky Hills. Birds in the region include meadowlarks, prairie chickens, barn owls, burrowing owls, the common nighthawk, dickcissels, lark sparrows, northern bobwhites, red-headed woodpeckers, piping plovers, Upland Sandpipers. Monarch and Regal Fritillary butterflies are also seen. Reptiles include massasauga snakes, the plains hog-nosed snake, the Texas horned lizard, as well as the smooth softshell turtle.

The aquatic and wooded habitats available near reservoirs and streams showcase a different array of animals. Open water attracts eagles, ospreys, grebes, and sandhill cranes. Woodlands provide hiding places for warblers, beavers, and muskrats.

== Gallery ==
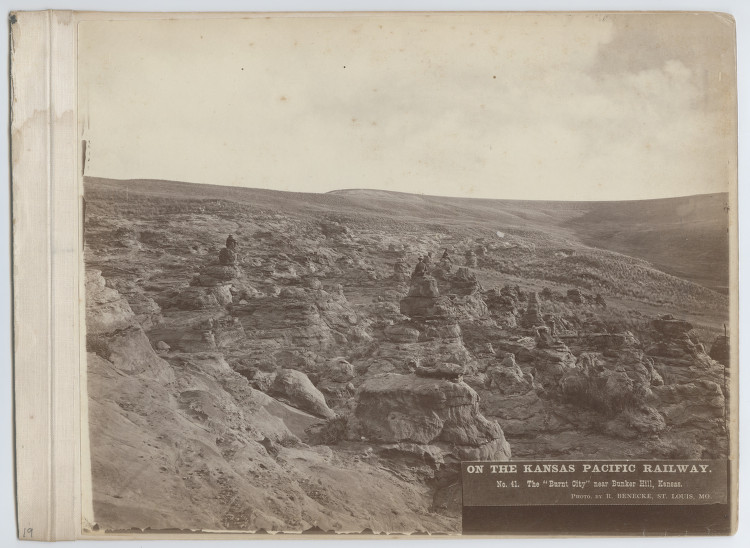
"Burnt City" near Bunker Hill, Kansas (1873)

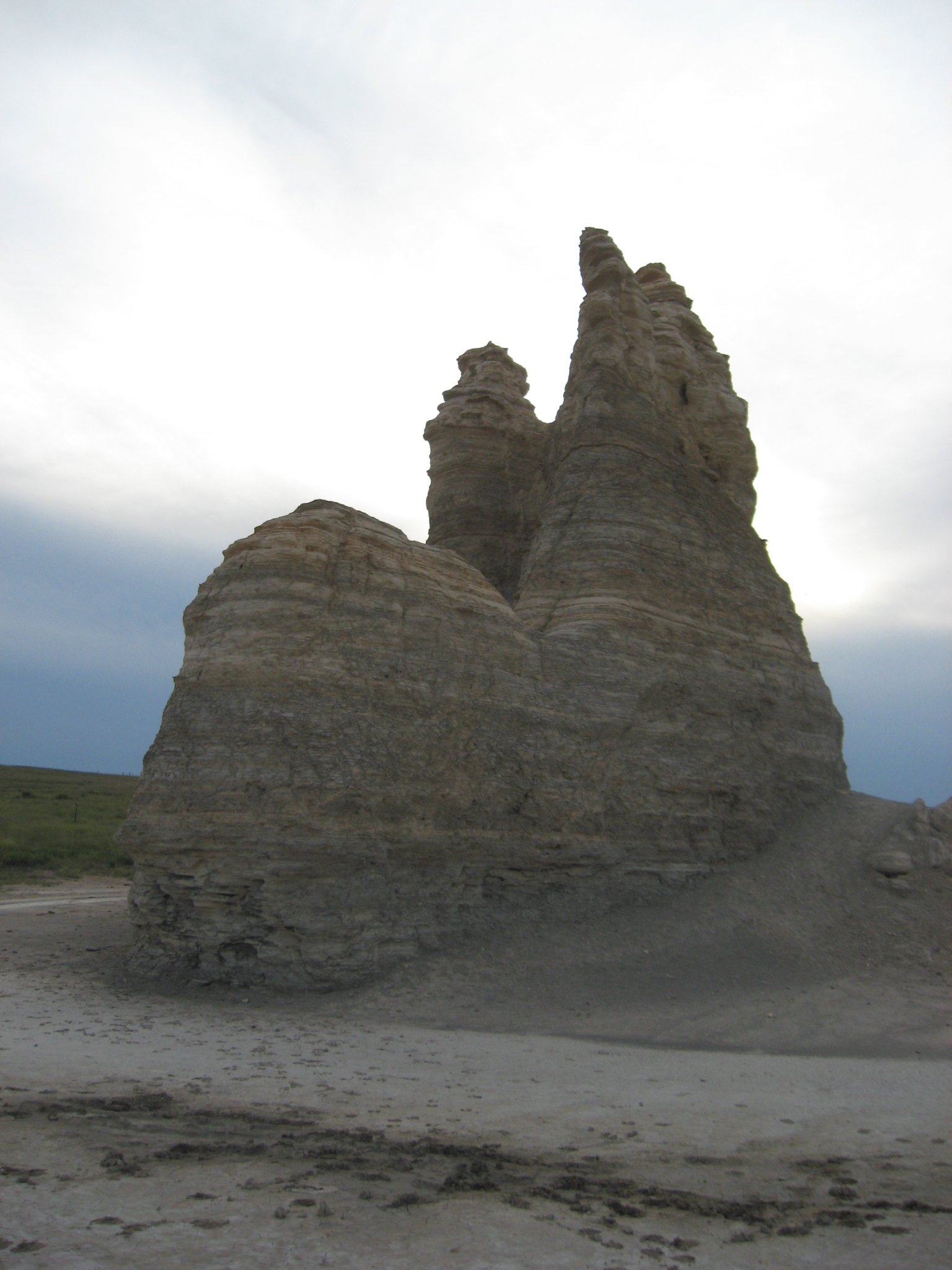
Castle Rock

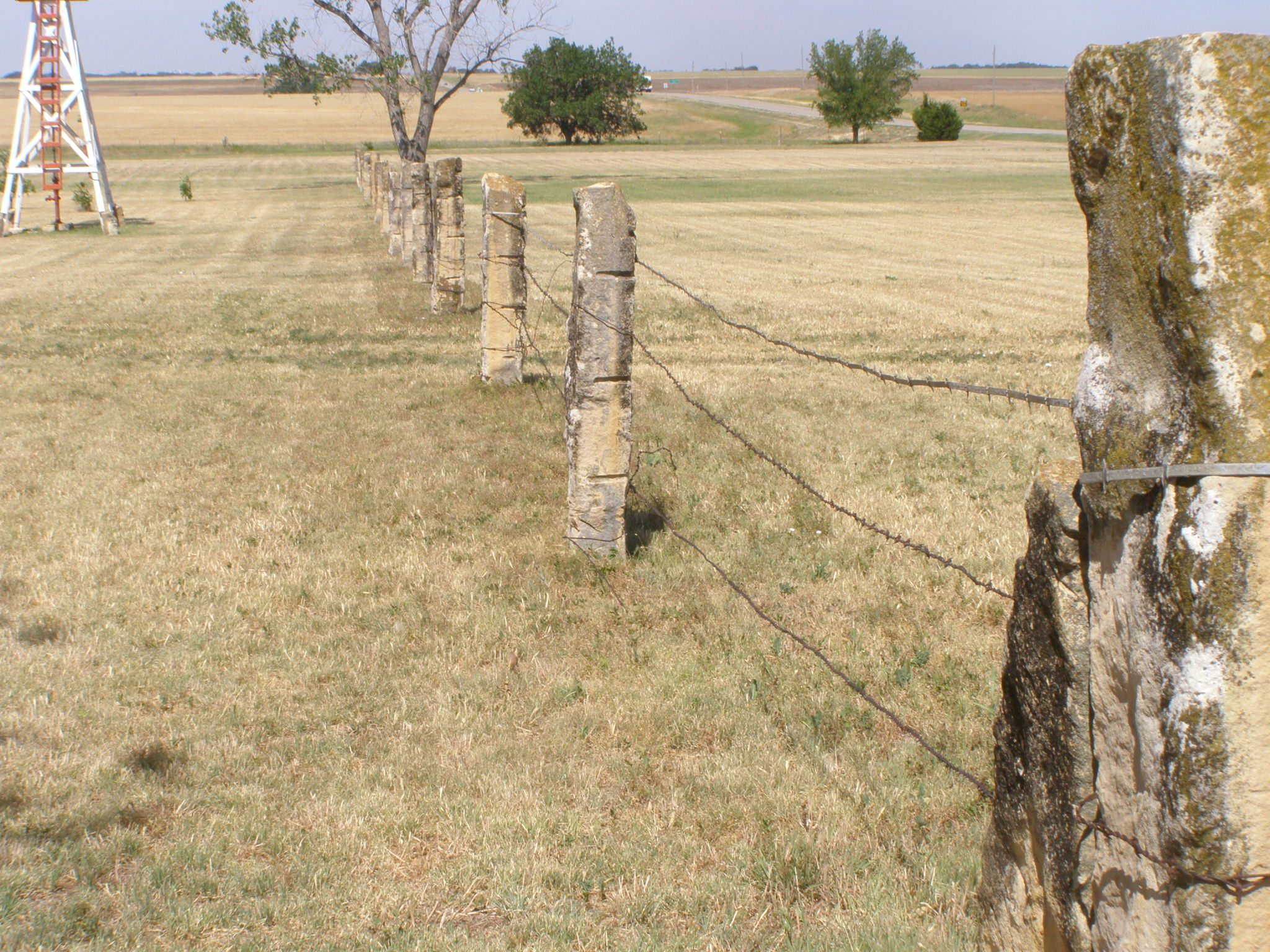
Limestone fence posts at the Santa Fe Trail Center

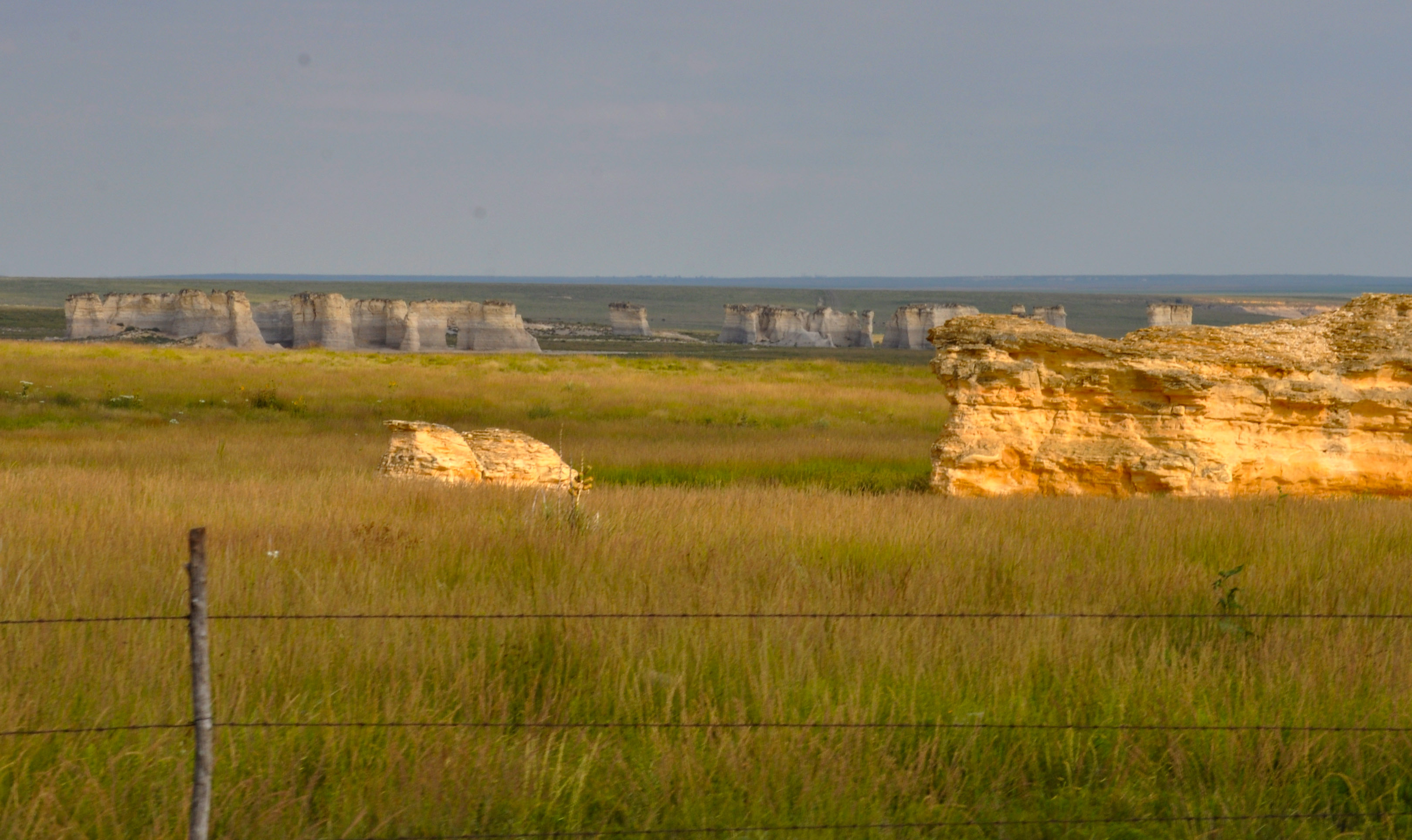
Monument Rocks

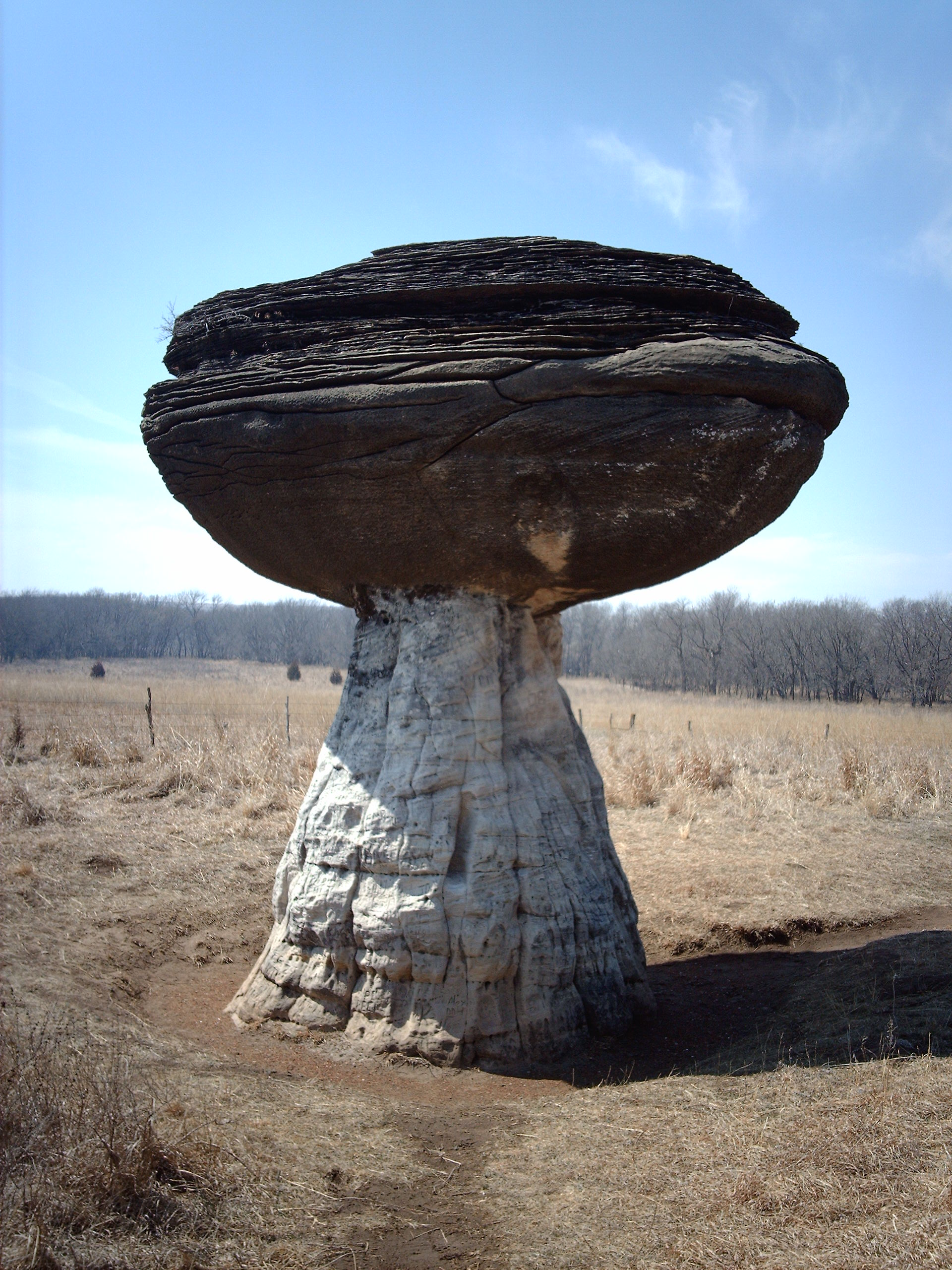
Mushroom Rock

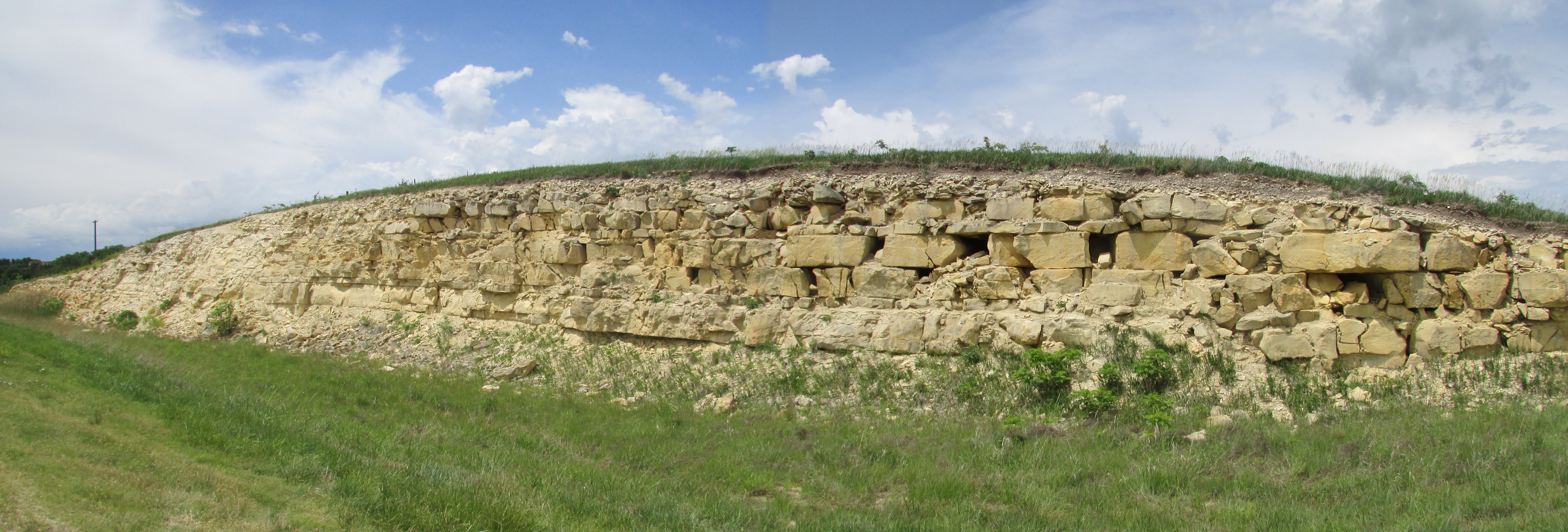
Niobrara Formation exposed in a Jewell County road cut

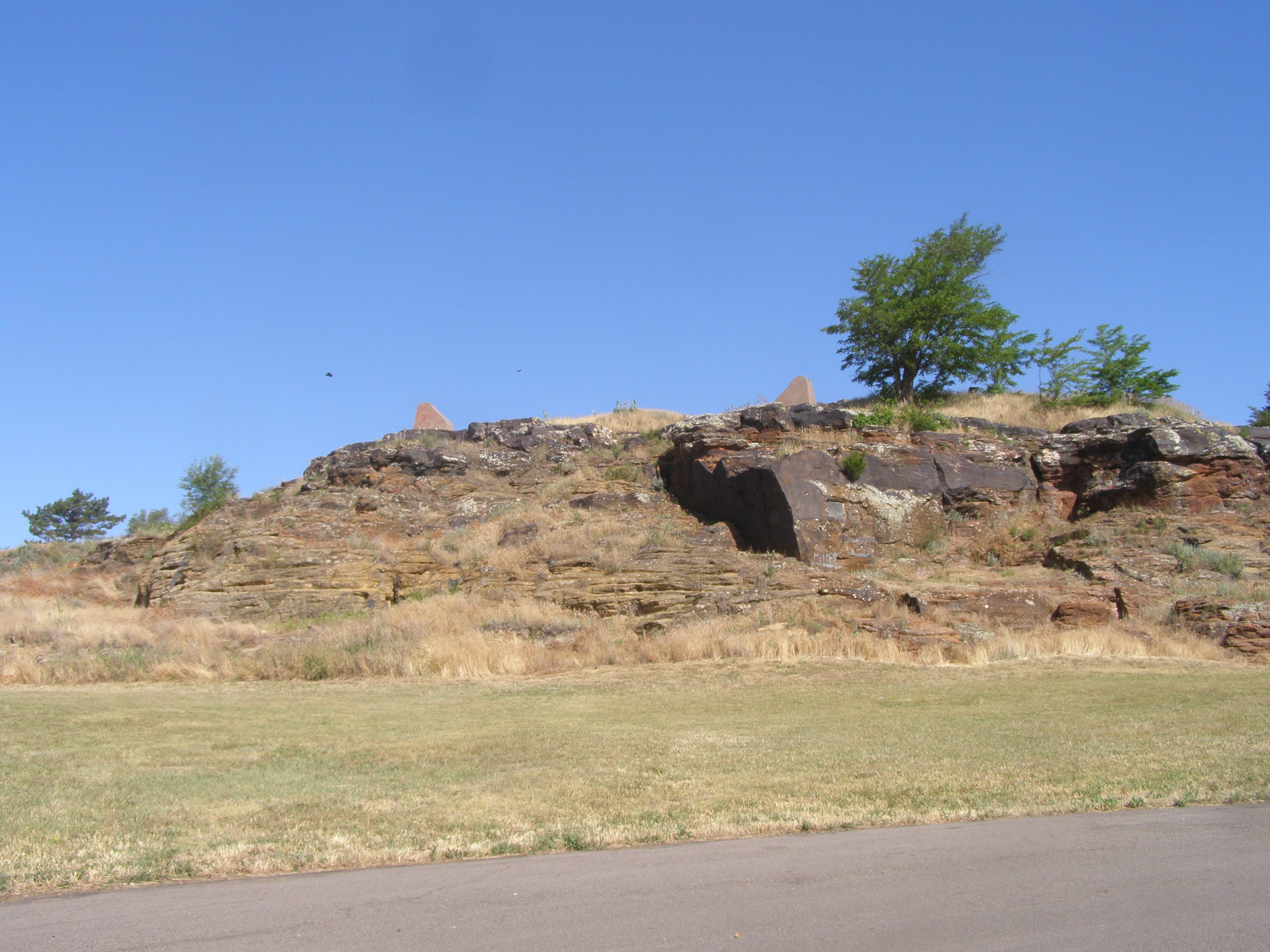
Pawnee Rock

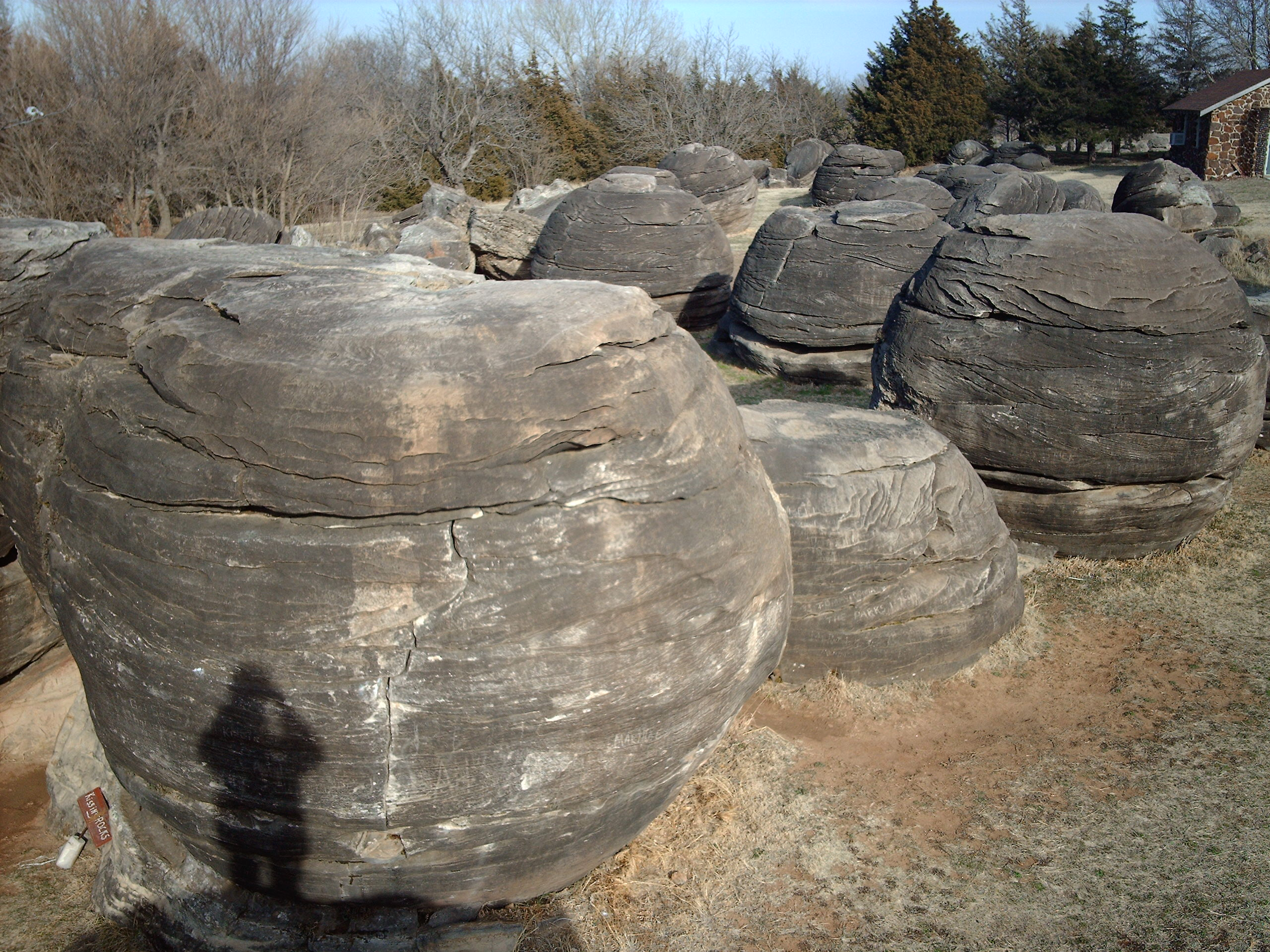
Rock City

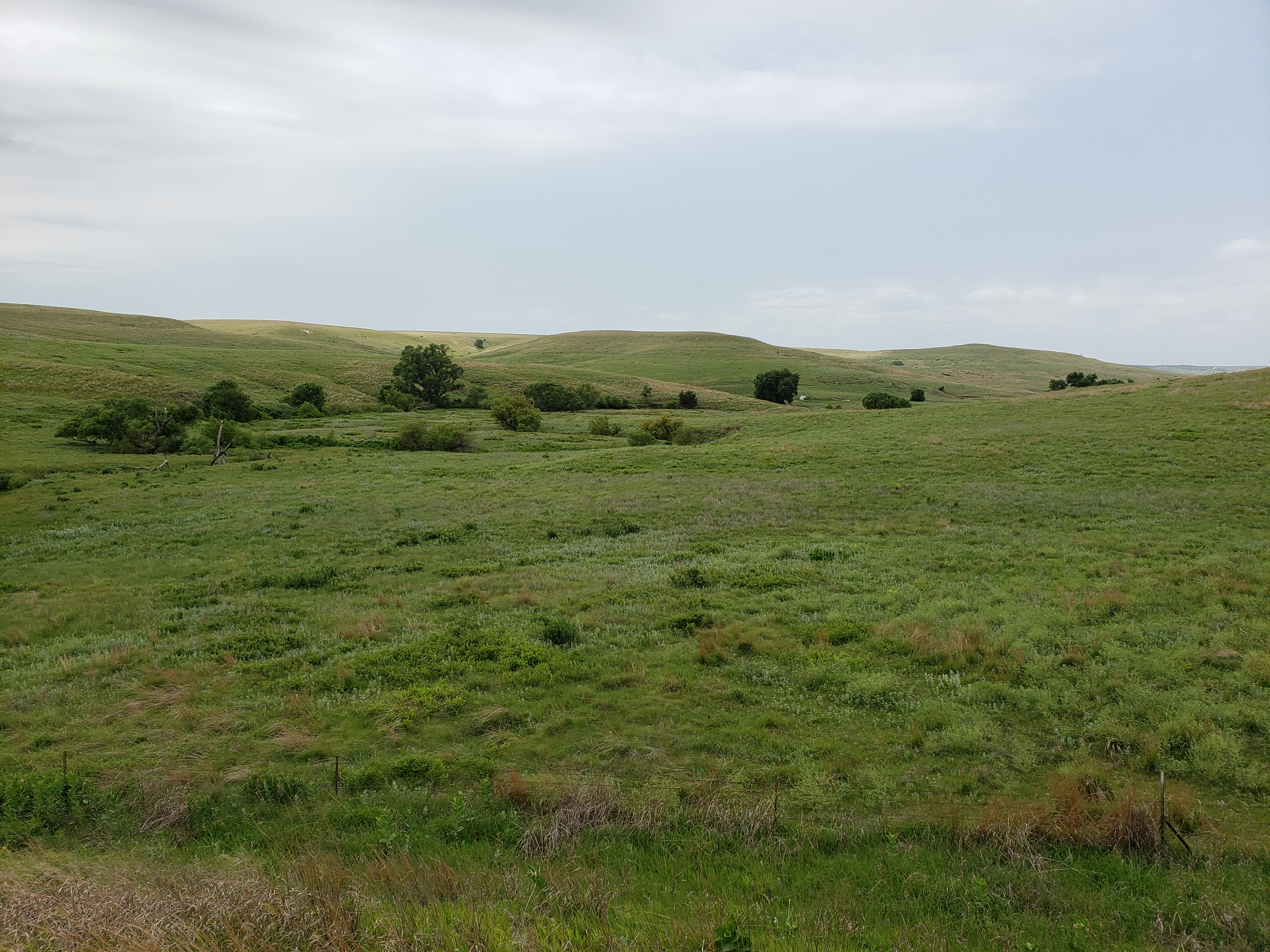
Typical Smoky Hills rangeland

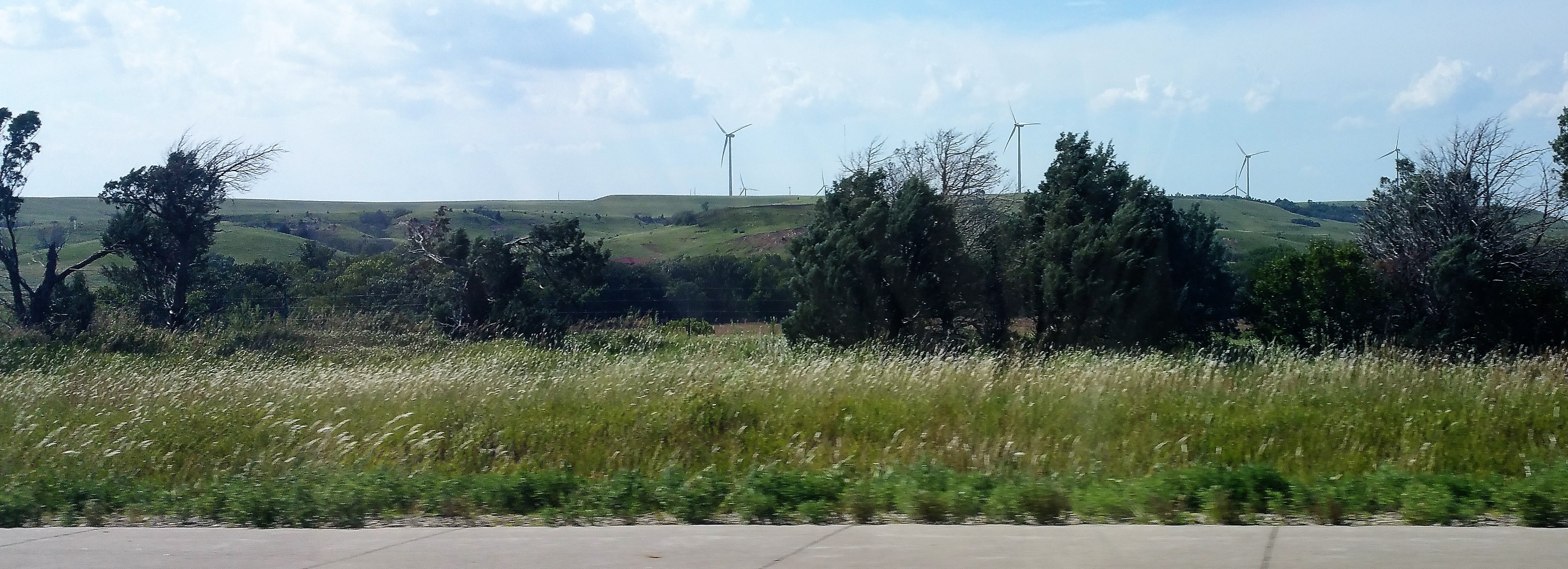
Smoky Hills Wind Farm viewed from I-70

== See also ==
- Smoky Hills Wind Farm
