= Keystone Gallery =

Western Kansas fossil museum and art gallery

Coordinates: 38.7430°N 100.8687°W

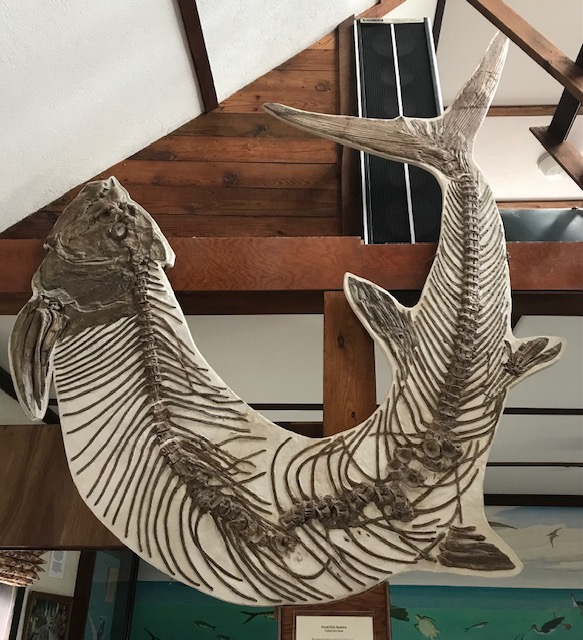
Nearly complete specimen of Xiphactinus, an extinct fish from the Cretaceous period

Keystone Gallery is a fossil museum north of Scott City, Kansas, that was established in 1991 in a former church building by Chuck Bonner and Barbara Shelton to display the region's fossils. Chuck Bonner is the son of the paleontologist Marion Charles Bonner, and the family's fossils are found in museums across the country. A mural by Bonner depicts ancient sea creatures that lived in this area of western Kansas 82 to 87 million years ago and were deposited in the Niobrara Formation.

The museum is nine miles, respectively, from Monument Rocks, Kansas's first National Natural Landmark; Historic Lake Scott State Park, home of El Cuartelejo, the only known Indian pueblo in Kansas; and Little Jerusalem Badlands State Park.

The museum's fossil collection includes a 20-foot mosasaur, a 14-foot Xiphactinus fish, Pteranodon specimens, fossil birds, and numerous other late Cretaceous animals. The owners are field paleontologists and were participants in the NOVA series Making North America.
