= Marion Charles Bonner =

American paleontologist, fossil collector

Marion Charles Bonner (1911–1992) was an American field paleontologist who discovered and collected hundreds of fossils, primarily from the Niobrara Cretaceous Smoky Hill chalk outcroppings in Logan, Scott, and Gove counties of western Kansas. Largely self-taught, he frequently collaborated with museum paleontologists, including George F. Sternberg, at Fort Hays State University in Hays, Kansas, and Shelton P. Applegate, at the Los Angeles County Museum of Natural History.

== Notable fossils collected by Bonner ==
Bonner’s fossil collecting career spanned 60 years. Notable specimens include a nearly complete short-necked plesiosaur, Dolichorhynchops osborni; three new species of invertebrates -- Pecten bonneri (bivalve mollusk described in 1968), Niobrarateuthis bonneri (squid described in 1957), and Enchoteuthus melanae (squid described in 1968). A new fish genus occupying the bottom-feeding niche in the Niobrara Cretaceous, called Bonnerichthys gladius, was described 18 years after Bonner’s death. Other notable finds from the Kansas Cretaceous include the most complete Hesperornis regalis specimen (Sternberg Museum, Hays, Kansas) and the most complete Platecarpus mosasaur (Natural History Museum of Los Angeles - LACM specimen 128319). In 1982, Bonner collected a "fish-within-a-fish" (a Gillicus inside a Xiphactinus ), similar to the famous fossil collected by George Sternberg on display at the Sternberg Museum. The Bonner fish-within-a-fish is on display at the Royal Tyrell Museum of Paleontology.

== Exhibitions ==
In the 1980s and 1990s, the Los Angeles museum displayed Bonner's Kansas fossils on a wall titled "The Bonner Collection," which is now housed in the display and research areas and titled Kansas Seaway, Late Cretaceous Marion C. Bonner Collection.

In addition to the Sternberg and the LACM, institutions holding his fossils include the University of Kansas Museum of Natural History (Lawrence, Kansas), the American Museum of Natural History (New York), the Field Museum of Natural History (Chicago), the Denver Museum of Nature and Science, and the Royal Tyrell Museum of Paleontology (Drumheller, AB, Canada).

== Family ==
Many of the fossils Bonner collected were discovered by members of his family of eight children, two of whom became paleontologists. Orville Bonner was staff paleontologist at the University of Kansas Museum of Natural History, and Charles Bonner hunts and collects in Western Kansas and maintains a fossil museum and art gallery called Keystone Gallery, north of Scott City, Kansas.
