= Pawnee Rock, Kansas =

City in Barton County, Kansas, United States

- City
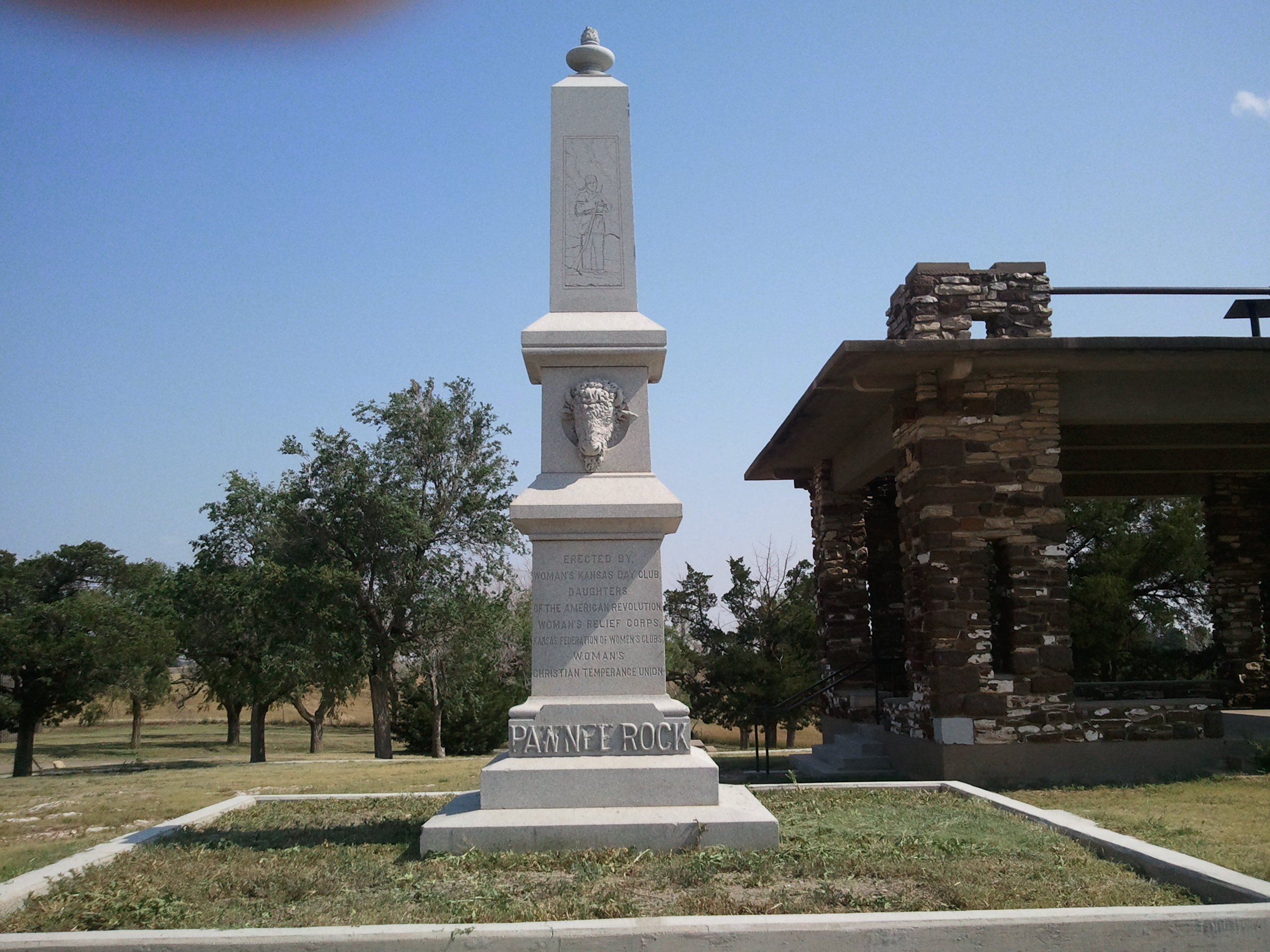
- Pawnee Rock Monument near Pawnee Rock (2013)

- Location within Barton County and Kansas

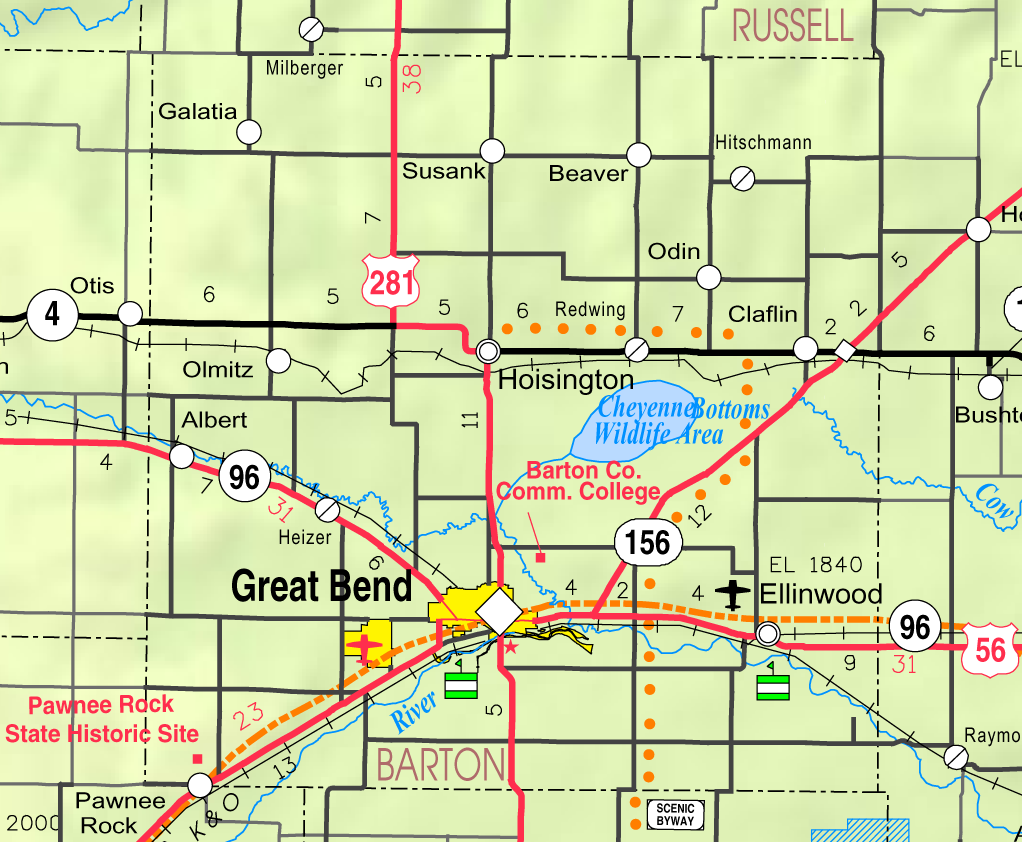
- KDOT map of Barton County (legend)
- Coordinates: 38°15′55″N 98°58′57″W
- Country: United States
- State: Kansas
- County: Barton
- Founded: 1874
- Incorporated: 1887
- Named for: Pawnee Rock

Area
  - Total: 0.28 sq mi (0.73 km^{2})
  - Land: 0.28 sq mi (0.73 km^{2})
  - Water: 0 sq mi (0.00 km^{2})
- Elevation: 1,946 ft (593 m)

Population (2020)
  - Total: 193
  - Density: 680/sq mi (260/km^{2})
- Time zone: UTC-6 (CST)
  - Summer (DST): UTC-5 (CDT)
- ZIP Code: 67567
- Area code: 620
- FIPS code: 20-54875
- GNIS ID: 484937
- Website: pawneerock.org

Pawnee Rock is a city in Barton County, Kansas, United States. As of the 2020 census, the population of the city was 193.

== History ==
Pawnee Rock was founded in 1874. It was named from the historic landmark Pawnee Rock nearby. William Bunting became Pawnee Rock's first mayor when the town was incorporated in 1887.

=== Pawnee Rock State Historic Site ===
One-half mile north of U.S. 56 and the town of Pawnee Rock is Pawnee Rock State Historic Site, a monument to travelers on the Santa Fe Trail that marks the trail's approximate halfway point. The monument consists of a rough stone pole building used for picnics and a granite pillar-shaped monument atop a small hill.

== Geography ==
According to the United States Census Bureau, the city has a total area of 0.28 square miles (0.73 km^{2}), all land.

While located in Barton Country, the south edge of Pawnee Rock lies along the Barton / Pawnee county line.

== Demographics ==
Historical population
Census	Pop.	Note	%±
1880	84		—
1890	204		142.9%
1900	210		2.9%
1910	458		118.1%
1920	428		−6.6%
1930	399		−6.8%
1940	388		−2.8%
1950	359		−7.5%
1960	380		5.8%
1970	442		16.3%
1980	409		−7.5%
1990	367		−10.3%
2000	356		−3.0%
2010	252		−29.2%
2020	193		−23.4%
U.S. Decennial Census

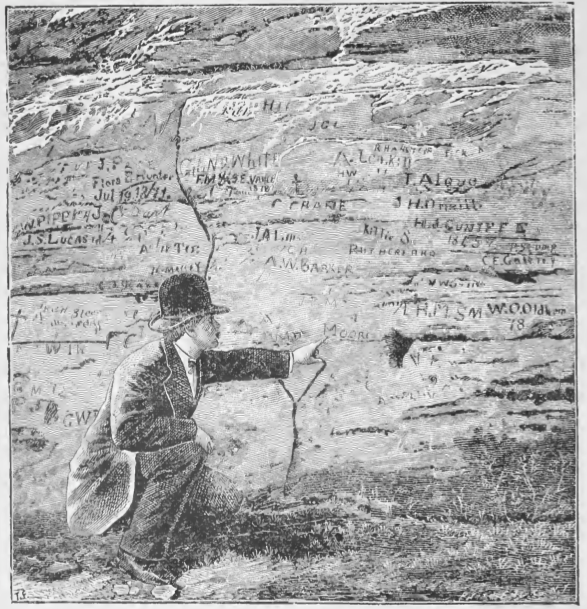
Pawnee Rock (1880)

=== 2020 census ===
The 2020 United States census counted 193 people, 84 households, and 49 families in Pawnee Rock. The population density was 684.4 per square mile (264.2/km^{2}). There were 116 housing units at an average density of 411.3 per square mile (158.8/km^{2}). The racial makeup was 88.08% (170) white or European American (88.08% non-Hispanic white), 0.0% (0) black or African-American, 0.52% (1) Native American or Alaska Native, 0.52% (1) Asian, 0.0% (0) Pacific Islander or Native Hawaiian, 2.07% (4) from other races, and 8.81% (17) from two or more races. Hispanic or Latino of any race was 6.22% (12) of the population.

Of the 84 households, 29.8% had children under the age of 18; 44.0% were married couples living together; 29.8% had a female householder with no spouse or partner present. 36.9% of households consisted of individuals and 16.7% had someone living alone who was 65 years of age or older. The average household size was 2.3 and the average family size was 3.4. The percent of those with a bachelor's degree or higher was estimated to be 8.3% of the population.

25.4% of the population was under the age of 18, 5.2% from 18 to 24, 22.3% from 25 to 44, 28.5% from 45 to 64, and 18.7% who were 65 years of age or older. The median age was 42.8 years. For every 100 females, there were 105.3 males. For every 100 females ages 18 and older, there were 105.7 males.

The 2016–2020 5-year American Community Survey estimates show that the median household income was $46,429 (with a margin of error of +/- $8,682) and the median family income was $62,813 (+/- $13,055). Males had a median income of $40,417 (+/- $4,199) versus $24,063 (+/- $4,432) for females. The median income for those above 16 years old was $33,269 (+/- $9,156). Approximately, 8.3% of families and 15.7% of the population were below the poverty line, including 10.1% of those under the age of 18 and 6.5% of those ages 65 or over.

=== 2010 census ===
As of the census of 2010, there were 252 people, 107 households, and 71 families living in the city. The population density was 900.0 inhabitants per square mile (347.5/km^{2}). There were 137 housing units at an average density of 489.3 per square mile (188.9/km^{2}). The racial makeup of the city was 96.0% White, 0.4% Native American, 0.4% from other races, and 3.2% from two or more races. Hispanic or Latino of any race were 2.4% of the population.

There were 107 households, of which 30.8% had children under the age of 18 living with them, 46.7% were married couples living together, 14.0% had a female householder with no husband present, 5.6% had a male householder with no wife present, and 33.6% were non-families. 29.0% of all households were made up of individuals, and 9.3% had someone living alone who was 65 years of age or older. The average household size was 2.36 and the average family size was 2.93.

The median age in the city was 44.2 years. 25.4% of residents were under the age of 18; 5.1% were between the ages of 18 and 24; 21.2% were from 25 to 44; 37.3% were from 45 to 64; and 11.1% were 65 years of age or older. The gender makeup of the city was 54.4% male and 45.6% female.

== Education ==
The community is served by Fort Larned USD 495 public school district.

Pawnee Rock schools were closed through school unification. The Pawnee Rock High School mascot was the Braves.

== See also ==
- Santa Fe Trail
