= Rock City, Kansas =

Park in Kansas, U.S.

Rock City
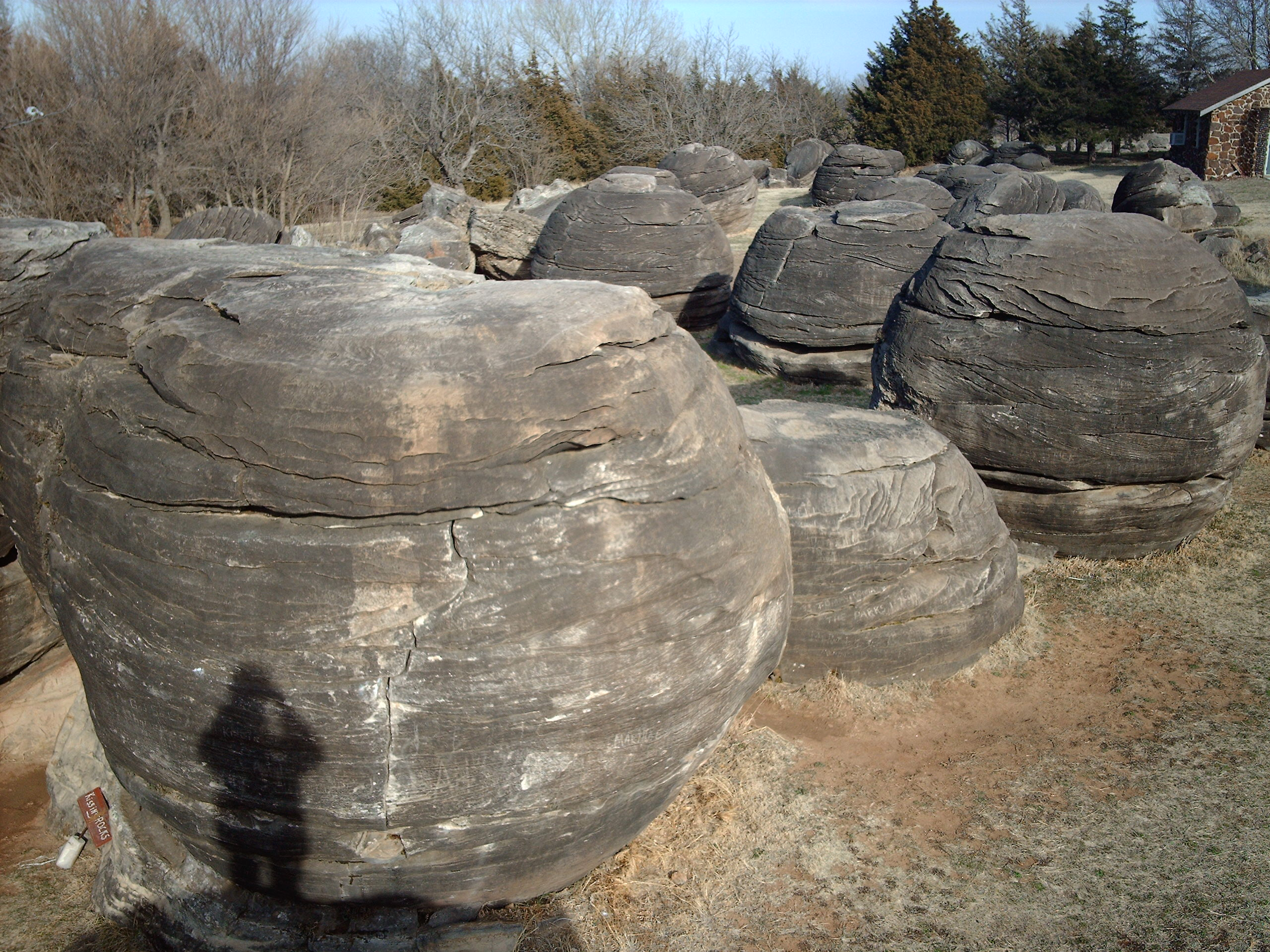
- Rock City, 2006

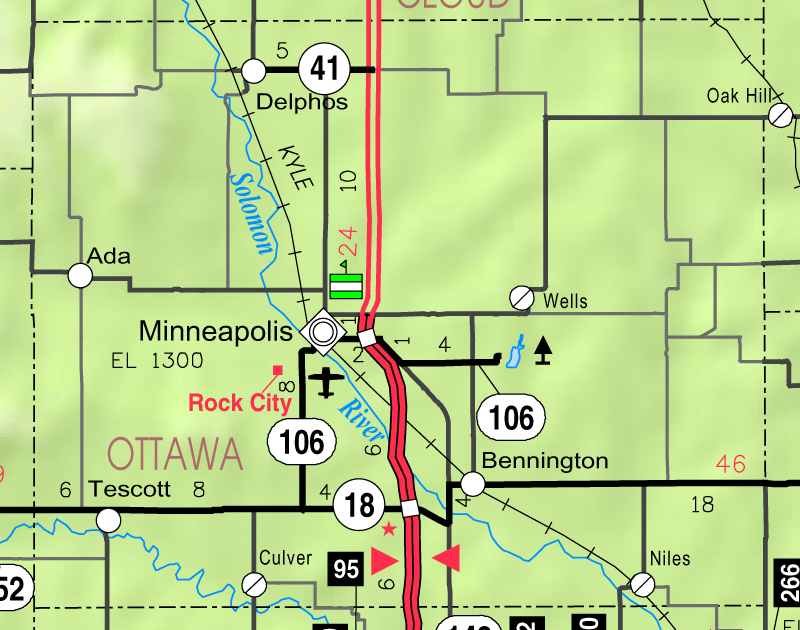
- Map showing location of Rock City
- Location: Minneapolis, Kansas, Ottawa, Kansas, Kansas, United States
- Coordinates: 39°5′27.20″N 97°44′7.99″W
- Elevation: 1,276 ft (389 m)
- Website: Web Site

U.S. National Natural Landmark
- Designated: 1976

Rock City is a park located on hillsides overlooking the Solomon River in Ottawa County, Kansas. It is 3.6 miles south of Minneapolis, Kansas and just over 0.5 mile west of Kansas highway K-106 and the Minneapolis City County Airport on Ivy Road. In a patch of prairie about 500 meters (1,600 feet) long and 40 meters (130 feet) wide, Rock City contains three clusters of large spherical boulders. These three clusters contain a total of 200 spherical boulders. It has been designated as a National Natural Landmark.

The park, owned by a non-profit corporation, has a visitor center and picnic tables. A small admission fee, which is used to maintain this park, is charged.

The remarkable size and spherical shape of these rock formation was first noted by Bell. Later, these boulders were either noted or described by Gould, Landes, Shaffer, Ward, and Swineford. Shaffer was the first person to map the distribution of these boulders at Rock City and investigate their petrography in detail.

== Physical characteristics ==
The large spherical boulders in Rock City are giant calcite-cemented concretions, typically called "cannonball concretions" because of their shape. They range in diameter from 3 to 6 meters (9.8 to 19.7 ft) with the average diameter being 3.6 meters (12 feet). These concretions lie 2 to 8 meters (6.6 to 26.2 ft) apart. Similar giant calcite-cemented concretions have also been found in a quartzite quarry within Lincoln County and in exposures of the similar age sandstones in Utah and Wyoming.

These boulders consist of well-sorted, medium-grained sandstone, which is tightly cemented by calcite. The sandstone consists of more than 95 percent quartz sand. About 20 percent of the original sandstone, mostly feldspar grains, has been replaced by the calcite. Pyrite, which is now oxidized to goethite, occurs within the calcite cement of these concretions as microscopic crystals and very small, knobby concretions. The pyrite concretions typically are about 30 cm (1-foot) in diameter. Also, included within these calcite concretions are smaller calcite concretions, which have been engulfed by the growth of the larger concretions.

The host rock, which contained these spherical boulders, consists of well-sorted, medium-grained, highly porous, and friable sandstone. Being only weakly indurated by small amounts of iron oxide, sometimes seen as Liesegang rings (banding) at Rock City, it is considerably softer and very much more easily eroded than the calcite concretions. The sand comprising it accumulated within a river channel, which is part of the Dakota Sandstone, which accumulated within a low-lying coastal plain. Differential cementation and later erosion of cross-bedding inherited from the riverine sand, in which these concretions occur, created the "ornamentation", which these concretions exhibit.

== Origin ==
In the past, the origin of the spherical boulders found at Rock City had been erroneously interpreted as glacial boulders, corals, concretionary masses of limestone, and normal erosional remnants of sandstone. Shaffer was the first person to recognize them as calcite-cemented concretions. From a detailed examination of the mineralogy of these concretions and the carbon and oxygen isotopes of the calcite cement comprising them, McBride and others concluded that they formed as the result of diffusion of calcium through and precipitation of calcite within the sandstone containing them after being deeply buried. The carbon and calcium comprising these concretions came either from marine limestone, shells, anhydrite, or some combination of these in addition to bicarbonate derived from oxidized methane from strata outside of, but hydrologically connected to, the Dakota Sandstone. After the formation of the concretions, differential erosion of the considerably softer sandstone surrounding them exposed as free-standing boulders.

== Gallery ==
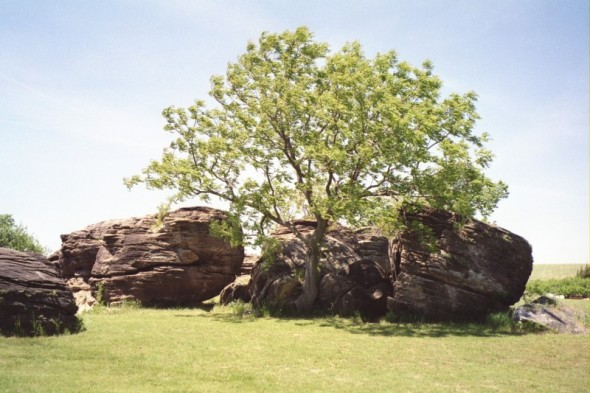
Tree at Rock City

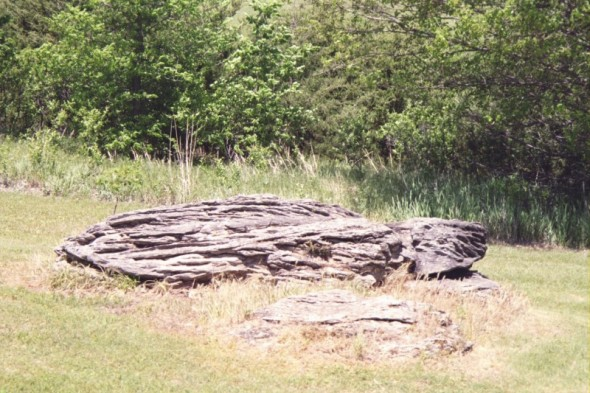
A turtle-shaped rock

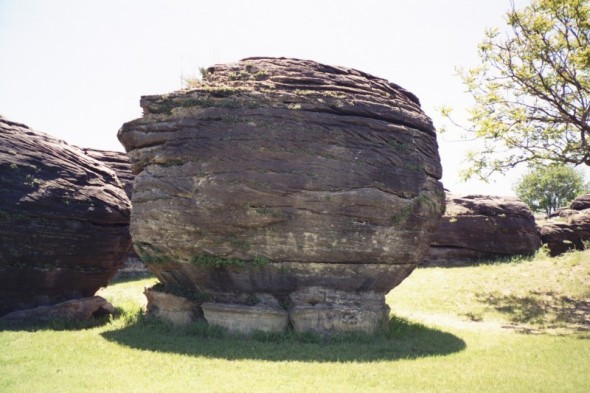
A large, round rock

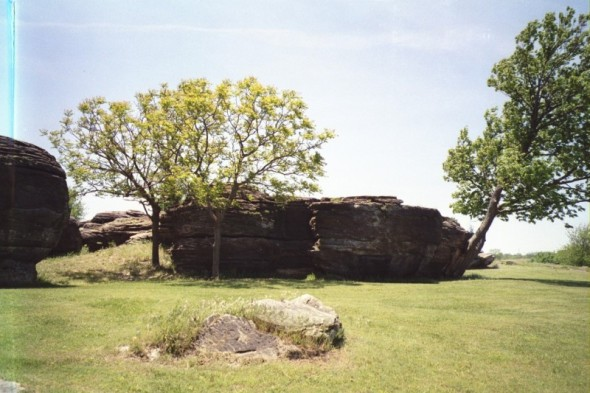
Trees at Rock City

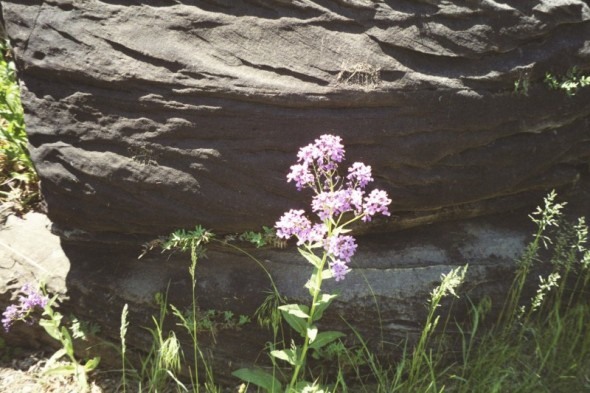
Hesperis matronalis growing by a rock in May

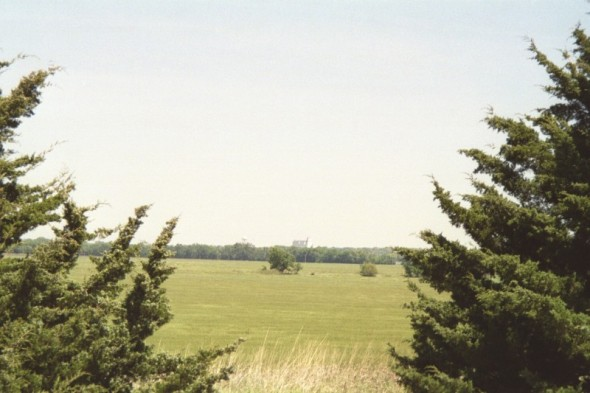
Looking towards Minneapolis, KS across rippling wheat fields in May

== See also ==
Other rock formations in Kansas:

- Castle Rock (Kansas)
- Monument Rocks (Kansas)
- Mushroom Rock State Park
