= Castle Rock (Kansas) =

Overland Trail landmark

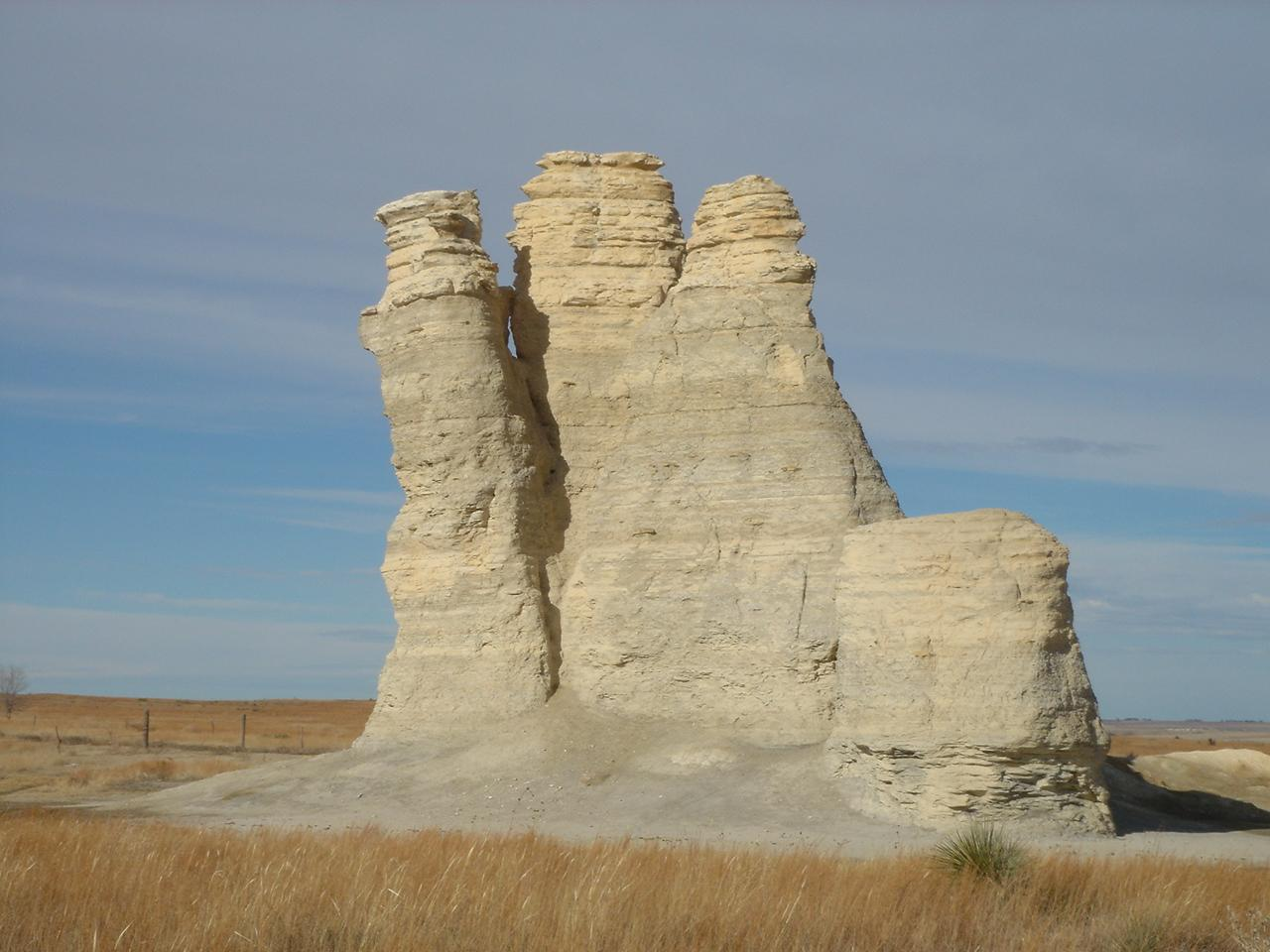
- Castle Rock in 2005

Highest point
- Elevation: 2,434 ft (742 m)
- Prominence: 70 ft (21 m)
- Coordinates: 38°51′40″N 100°10′11″W

Geography
- Location within Kansas Location within the United States

Geology
- Rock age: Cretaceous
- Mountain type: Erosional remnant

Castle Rock is a 70-ft-tall (21 m) chalk pillar landmark in Gove County, Kansas, United States. The formation and the nearby badlands are located in the Smoky Hills region of Kansas, which is about 11 mi (18 km) south of I-70 near Quinter, Kansas.

== Description ==
Castle Rock was a landmark on the Butterfield Overland Despatch route (Overland Trail). The chalk was deposited in the area by an ancient inland sea. The formation was carved by the weathering of the chalk by wind and water. It received its name because it is said to look like a castle rising above the prairie.

Weathering of the rock formation is increasing due to visitors climbing on the rocks. In 2001, following a thunderstorm, the tallest spire fell.

On January 29, 2008, Castle Rock and Monument Rocks 31 miles to the west were jointly named as one of the Eight Wonders of Kansas.

== Images ==
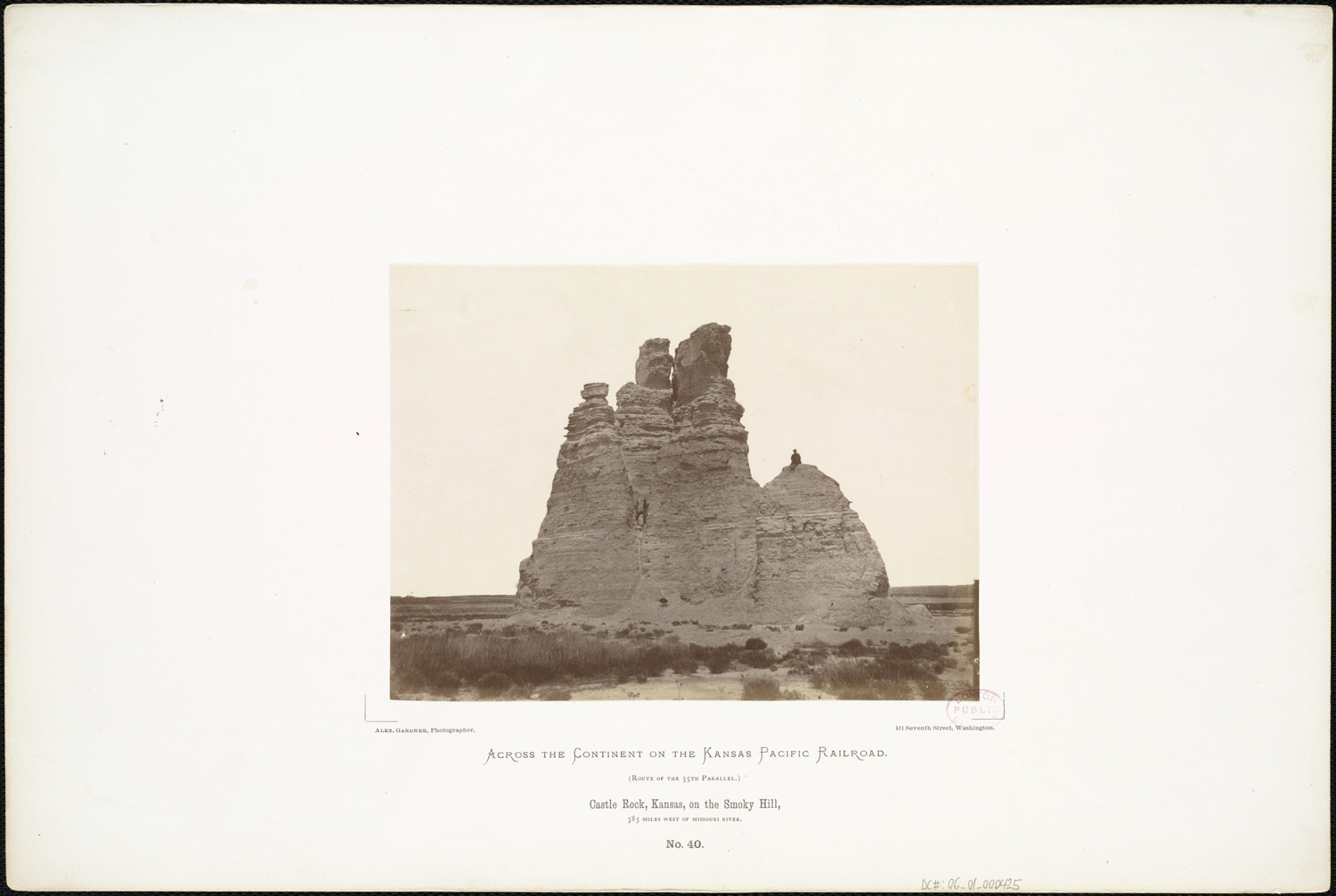
Castle Rock, 1867

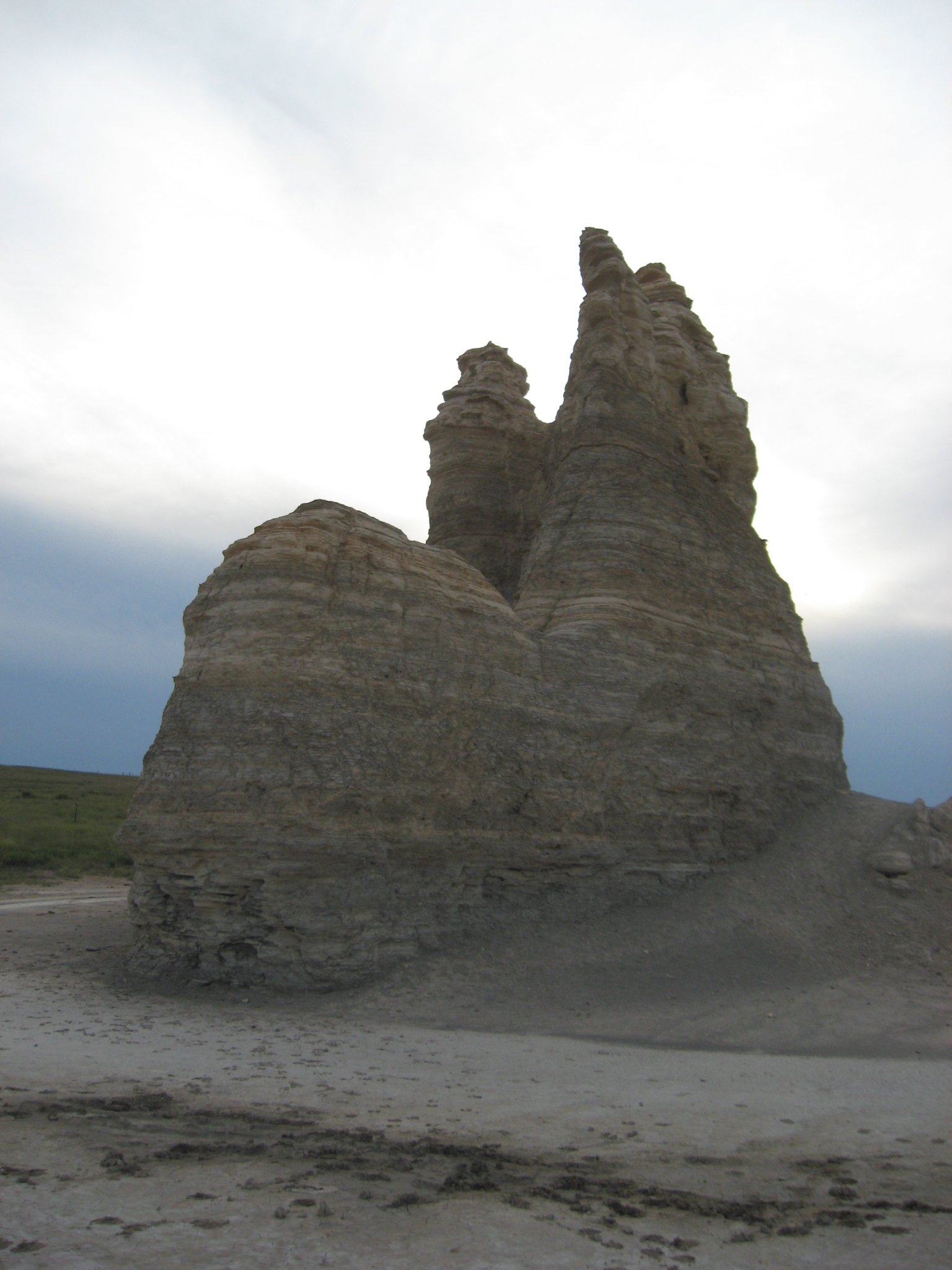
Castle Rock, 2009

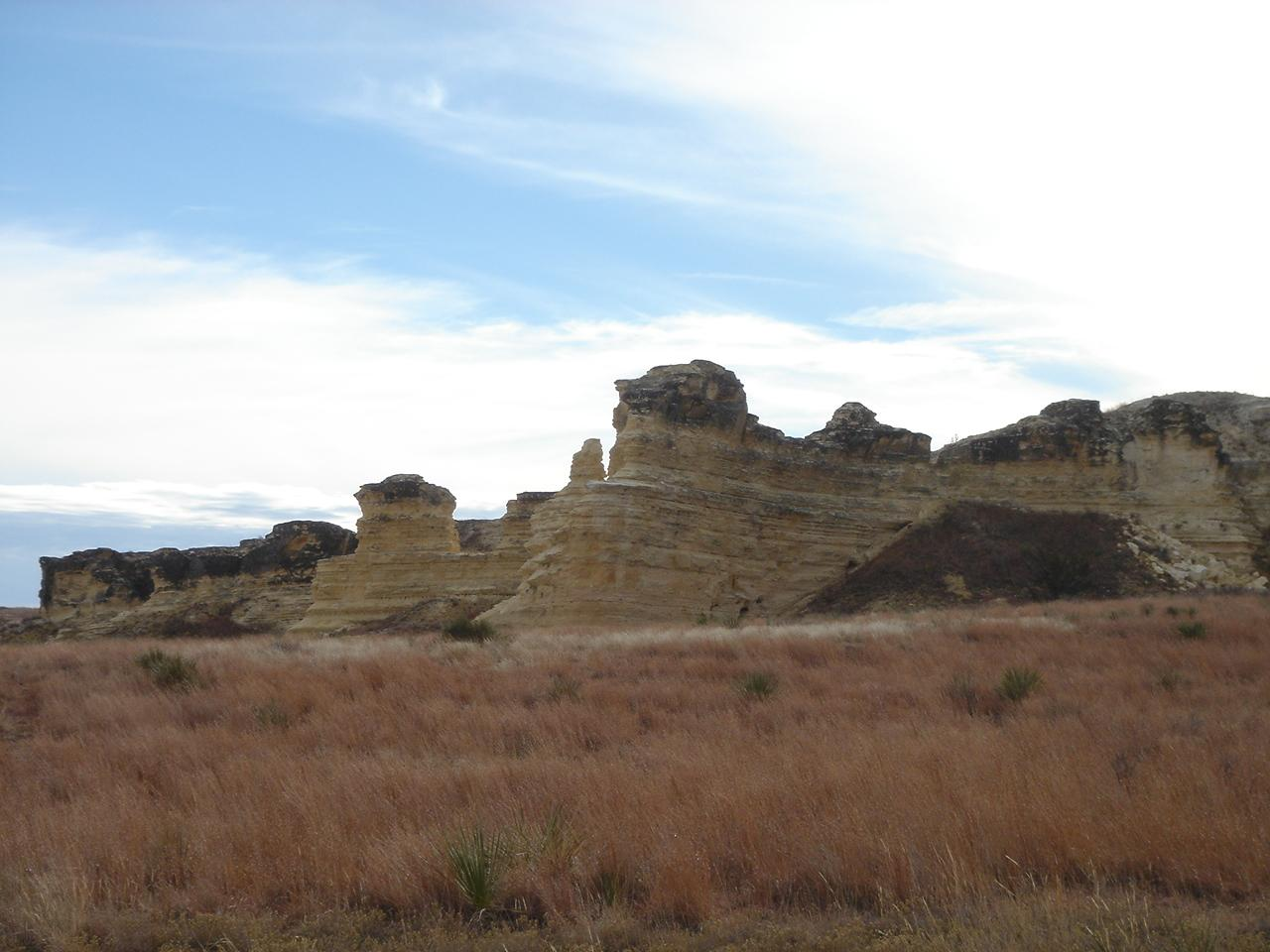

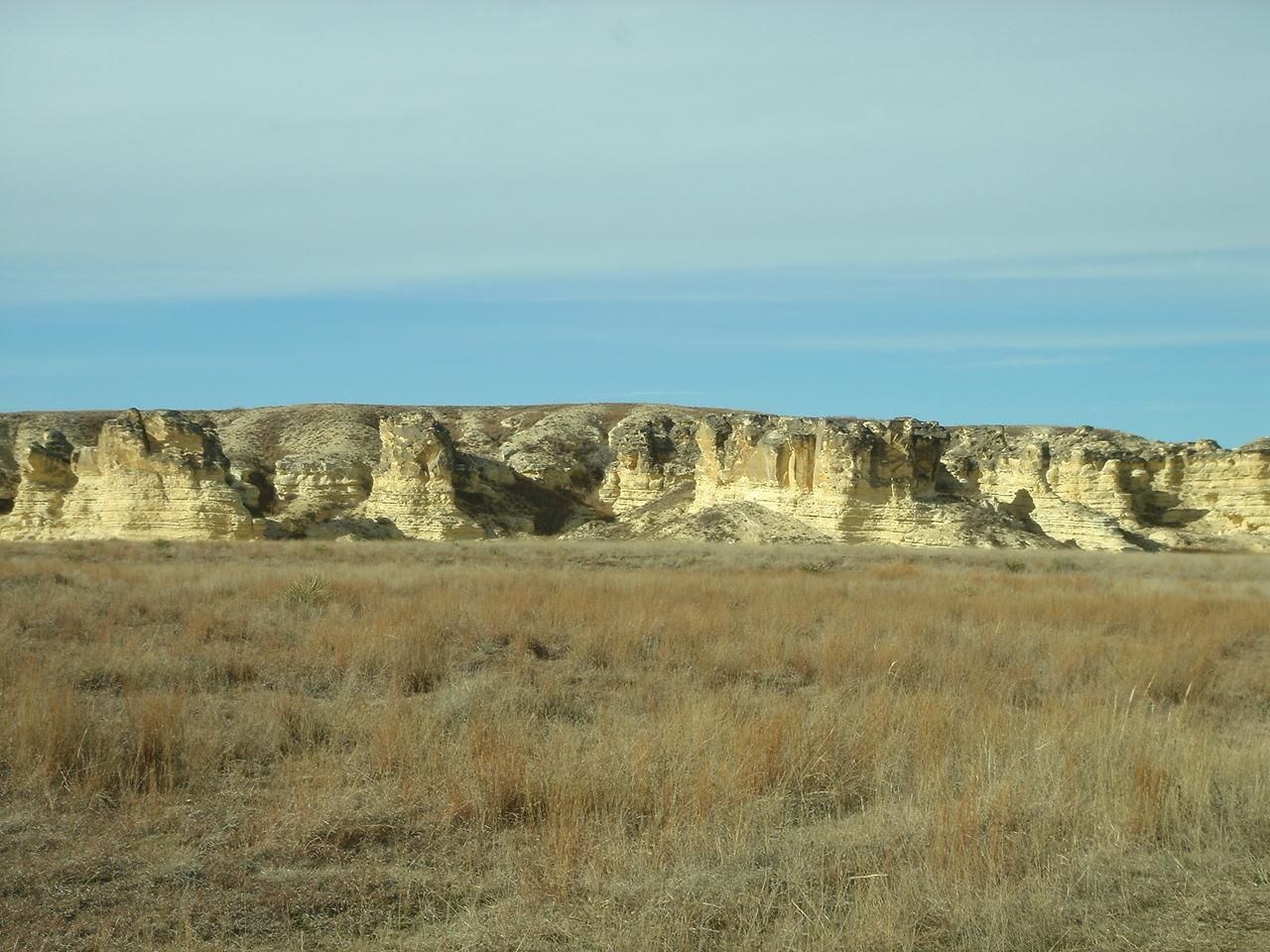

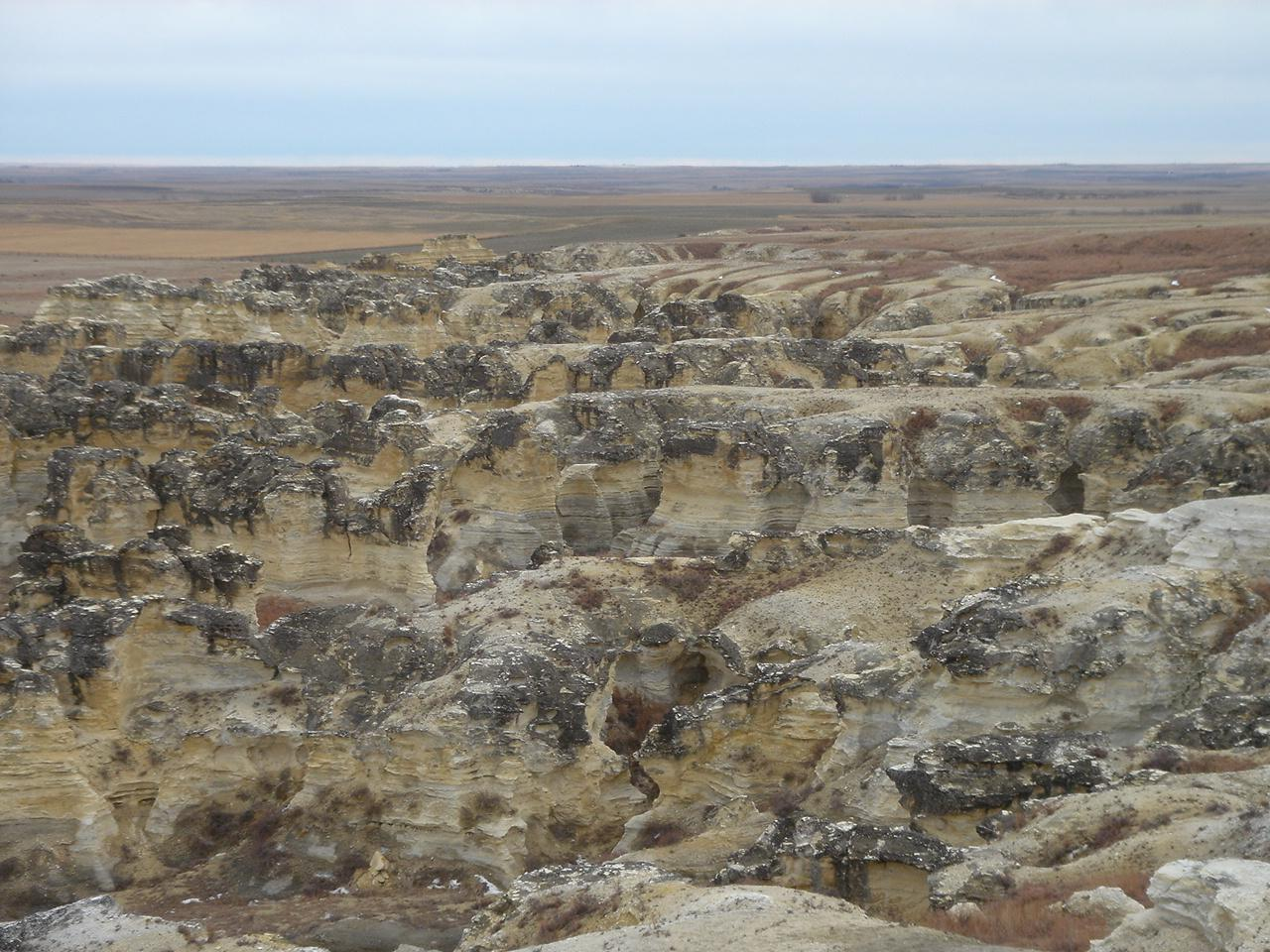

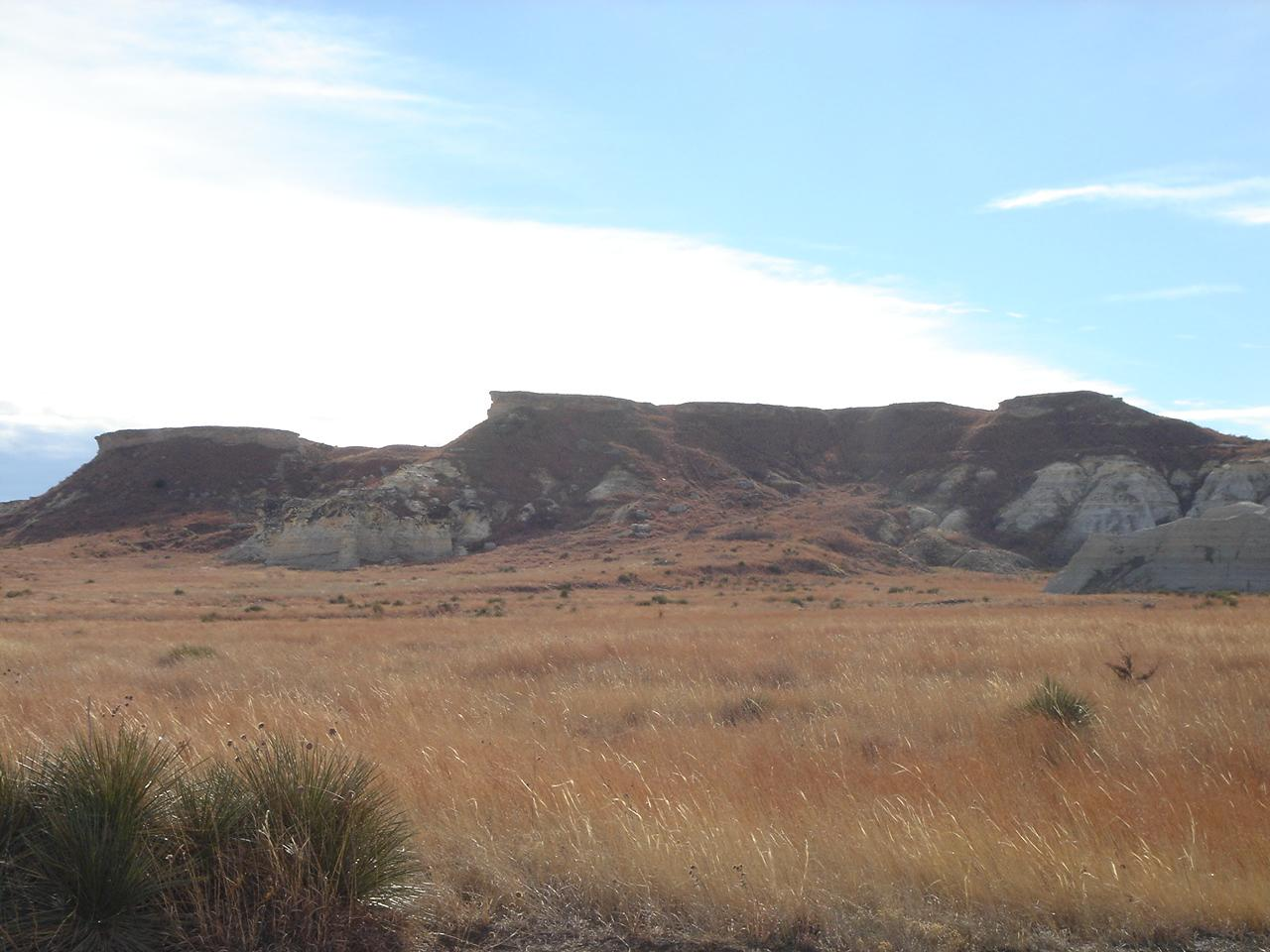

== See also ==
- Big Basin Prairie Preserve
- Little Jerusalem Badlands State Park
- Monument Rocks (Kansas)
- Mushroom Rock State Park
- Rock City, Kansas
