= Pawnee Rock =

- U.S. National Register of Historic Places
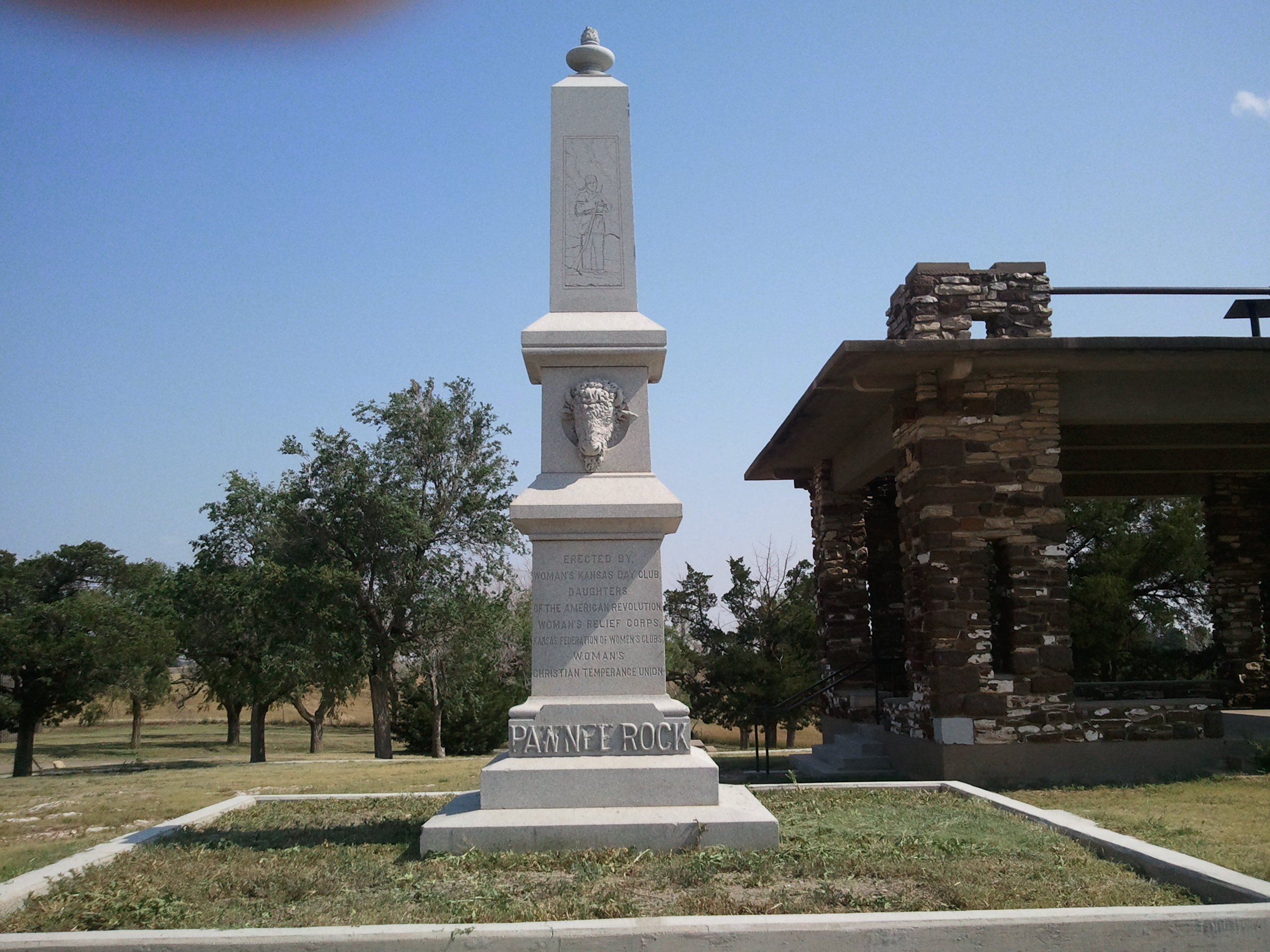
- Monument at Pawnee Rock

- Location within Kansas Location within the United States
- Nearest city: Pawnee Rock, Kansas
- Coordinates: 38°16′19.57″N 98°58′53.33″W
- NRHP reference No.: 70000247
- Added to NRHP: December 29, 1970

Pawnee Rock is an isolated natural rock outcrop on the Santa Fe Trail located in Pawnee Rock State Park, just north of Pawnee Rock, Kansas, United States. Originally over 150 feet (46 m) tall, railroad construction stripped it of some 15 to 20 feet (6.1 m) in height for road bed material. Today the prominence rises 50 or 60 feet (15 or 18 m) above the surrounding plains.

Matt Field, who traveled the Santa Fe Trail in 1840, later wrote, "Pawnee Rock springs like a huge wart from the carpeted green of the prairie." It was an easily visible landmark and common stopping point for traders, soldiers, and emigrants on the trail, many of whom carved their names into the brown sandstone. Some of these names are still visible among markings made by more recent visitors.

A memorial monument, picnic area, and pergola have been constructed at the top. From the top of the pergola there is a view of the Arkansas River valley and the route of the Santa Fe Trail. Pawnee Rock was added to the National Register of Historic Places around 1970. The site is administrated by the Kansas Historical Society as the Pawnee Rock State Historic Site.

== History ==
Pawnee Rock was for many years a place where Comanche, Kiowa, Arapaho, Cheyenne, and Pawnee tribes held their councils of war and peace. Many Indian battles were fought nearby in the days before white settlers came to Kansas. As a result, many bones have been found in the soil in the vicinity.

The natural rock formation served as a lookout for travelers on the Santa Fe Trail, as well as a rendezvous and ambush for the Indians. As a campsite it afforded some protection against hostile Indians. Many travelers and traders on the Santa Fe Trail considered Pawnee Rock the most dangerous place on the Central Plains for encounters with the Indians. Many Plains tribes reportedly used it as an observation point from which they could track buffalo herds and wagon trains. It was also a landmark for travelers, marking the approximate halfway point between Missouri and Santa Fe. In 1848, James Birch, a soldier on his way to the Mexican–American War, wrote: "Pawnee Rock was covered with names carved by the men who had passed it. It was so full that I could find no place for mine."

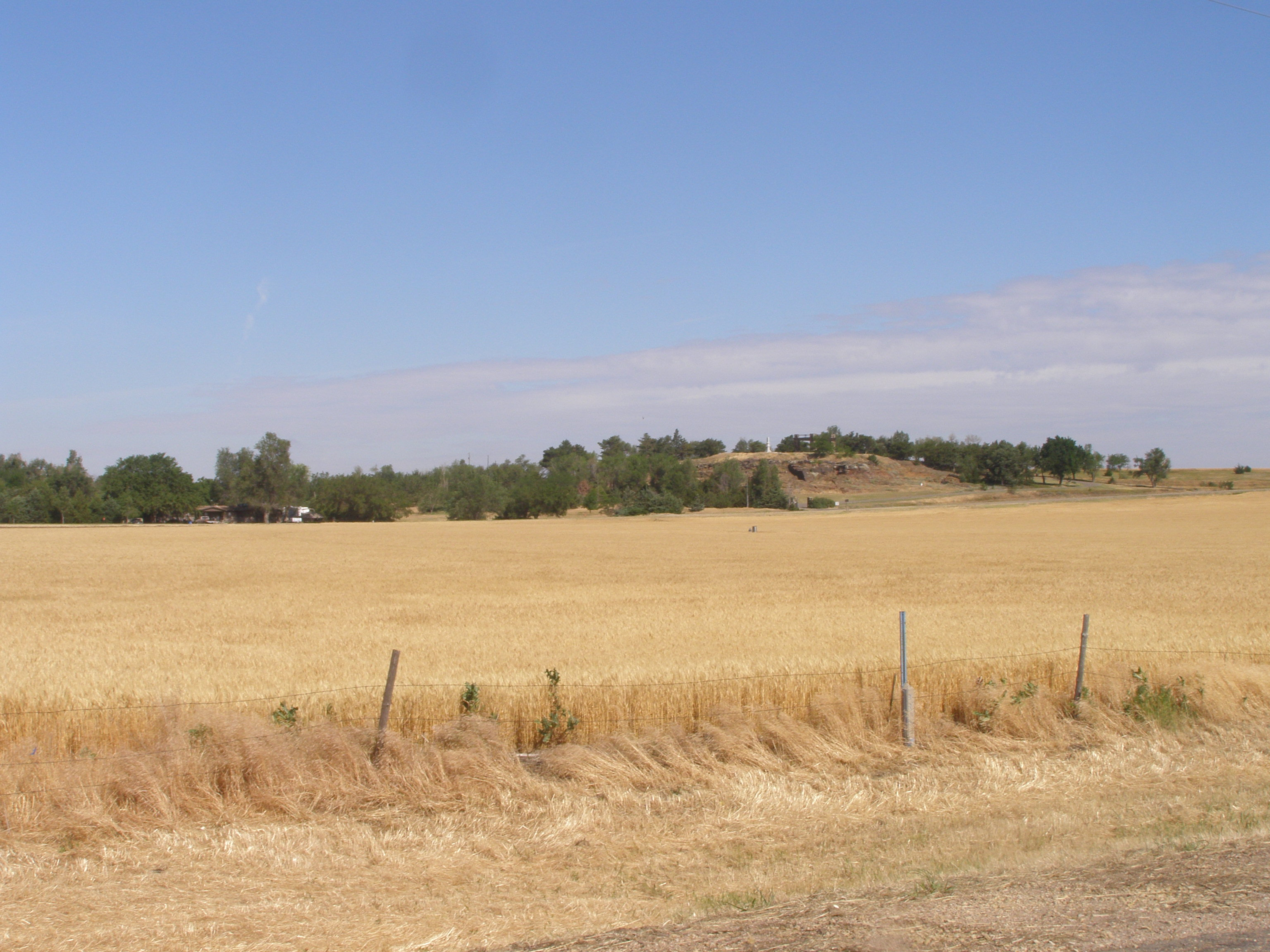
Pawnee Rock, approaching from the east along the old Santa Fe Trail, near Pawnee Rock, Kansas

Much of Pawnee Rock was destroyed in the 1870s by the railroad and by settlers gathering stone to be used for construction materials. The remnant was acquired in 1908 by the Woman's Kansas Day Club. In 1909, it was donated to the State of Kansas to be protected as an historic site. On May 24, 1912, a stone monument was dedicated with a great celebration before a crowd of some 8,000 onlookers. Pawnee Rock was listed in the National Register of Historic Places in 1970 and today is open to the public as Pawnee Rock State Historic Site.

== Naming Pawnee Rock ==
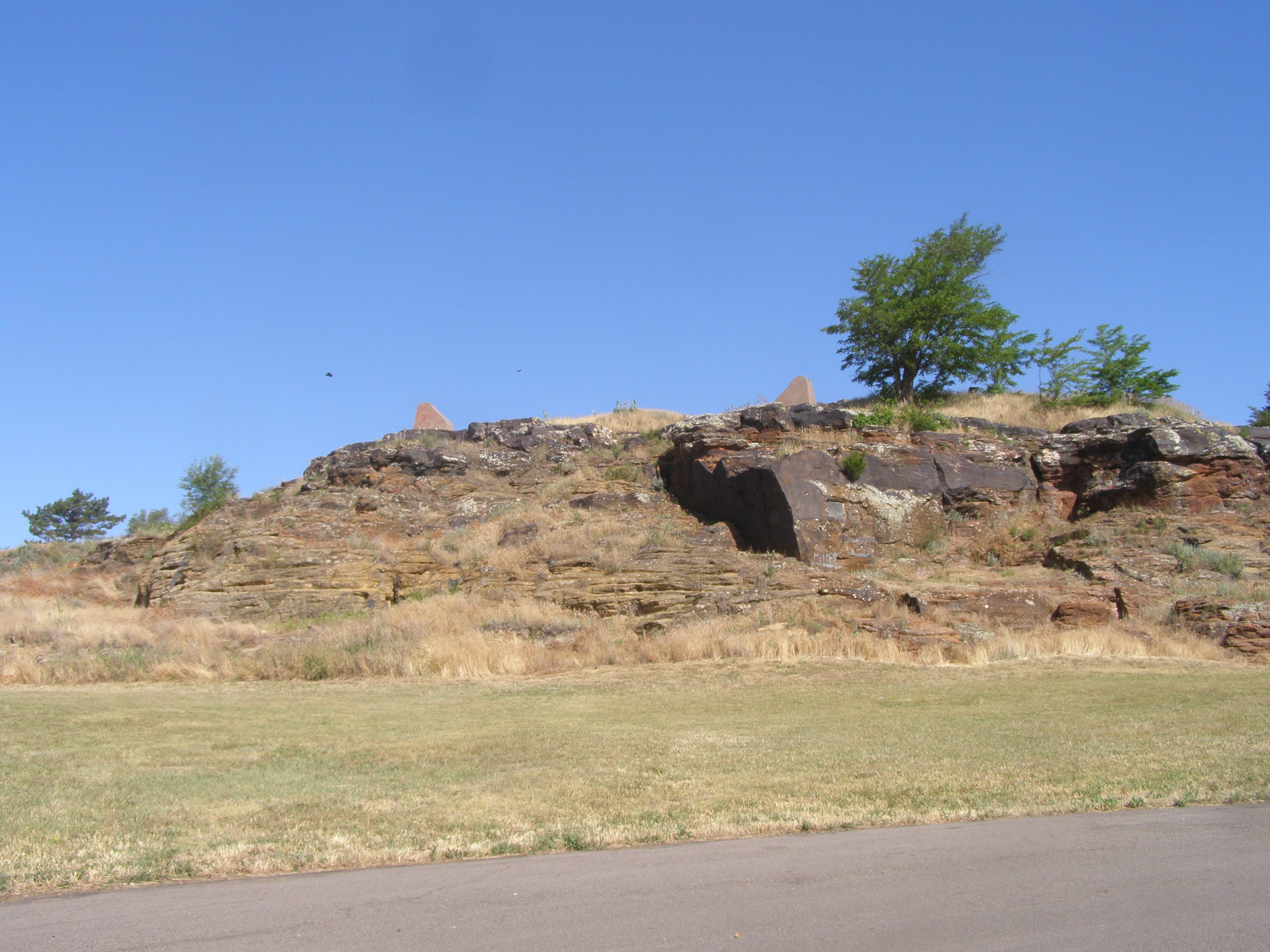
Pawnee Rock, Kansas

Many stories have been told about how Pawnee Rock got its name. One source for the name comes from the belief that the hill was sacred ground for the Pawnee Indians, who held tribal councils on its flat top. Another suggests the rock was the site of a great battle in which a small band of Pawnees were destroyed by a force of Kiowas, Cheyennes, and Arapahos. Both stories come from Pawnee lore. Among the plainsmen it was said that the rock got its name in 1826. Kit Carson, only 17 years old, was on his first trip west. He was working his passage on a wagon train which stopped near the rock. While on guard duty, he shot his own mule, thinking it was an attacking Pawnee. His associates commemorated his experience by naming the place Pawnee Rock.

== Bibliography ==
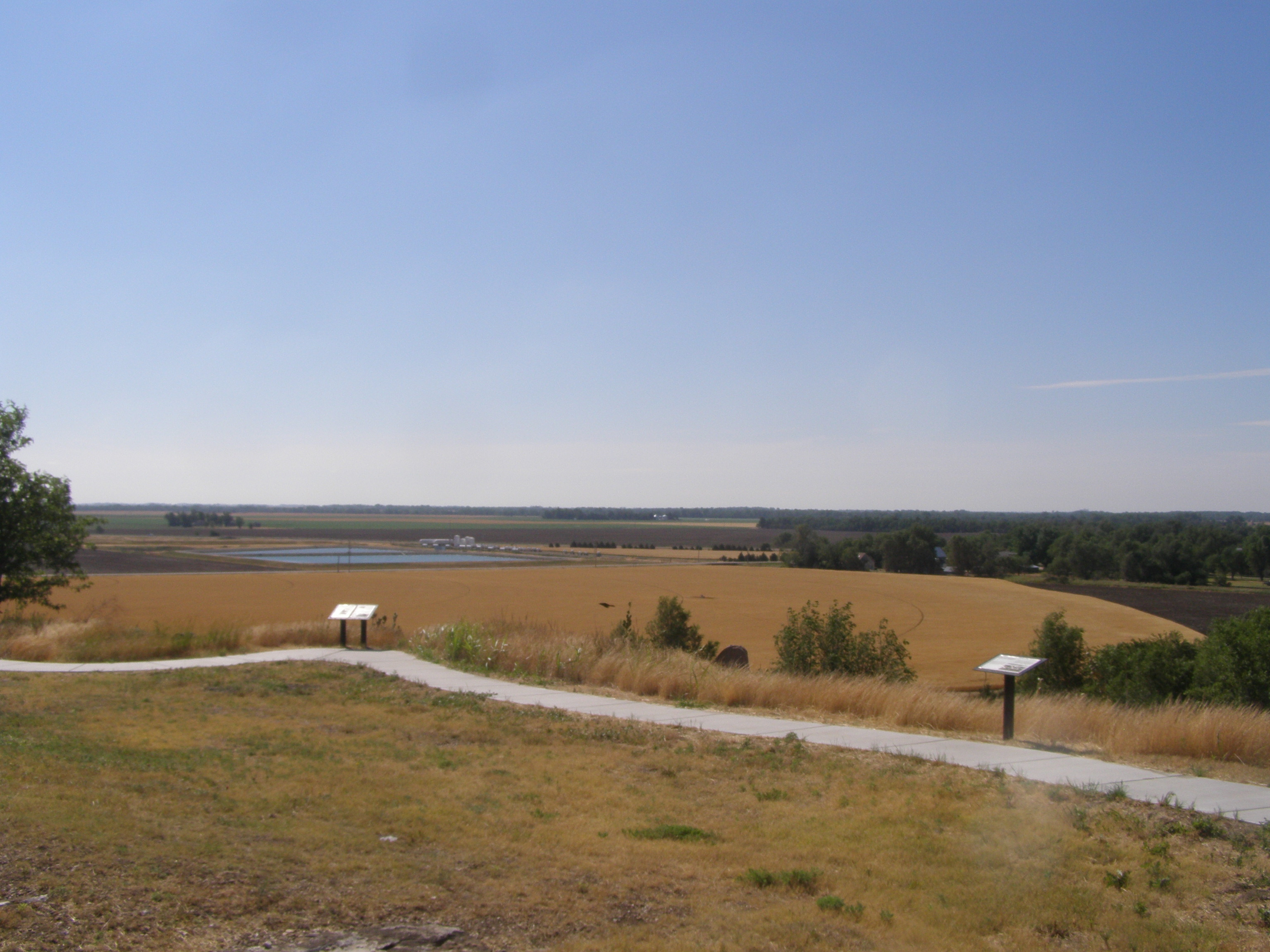
Interpretive trail around the rim of Pawnee Rock, Pawnee Rock State Park

- Biographical History of Barton County, Kansas; Tribune Publishing Co.; Great Bend, Kansas; 1912 p 145
- Blackmar, Frank W.; Kansas, A cyclopedia of State History, V. 2; Chicago Standard Publishing Col; 1912; pp 455–457
- Porter, Clyde & Mae Reed and John E. Sunder; Matt Field on the Santa Fe Trail; University of Oklahoma Press; Norman, Oklahoma; 1960
- Survey of Historic Sites and Structures in Kansas; Kansas State Historical Society; Topeka, Kansas; 1957
- Echoes of Pawnee Rock, compiled by Margaret Perkins (Wichita, KS, 1908)
