= Ada Swineford =

American mineralogist

- Born: July 12, 1917; Chicago
- Died: July 31, 1993 (aged 76)
- Occupations: Professor and geologist
- Employer: Western Washington State College
- Known for: Kansas geology

Ada Swineford (July 12, 1917 – July 31, 1993) was a clay mineralogist and Professor of geology at Western Washington State College in Bellingham. Swinefordite is named after her.

== Life ==
Swineford was born in Chicago on 17 June 1917. Her parents were Charles and Kate (born Watson) Swineford and she was unusual in deciding to choose geology when few women were involved. Her father was a professor of engineering at the Chicago Institute of Technology. She obtained her own science degree in 1940 and a master's degree in 1942 at the University of Chicago. The same year she joined the geological Survey of Kansas. By 1949 she led the petrology department. In 1954 she was awarded a doctorate by Pennsylvania State University and in 1958 she began teaching at the University of Kansas and in 1964 she was an associate professor.

In 1961 she and Paul C. Franks published the proceedings of the "Clay and Clay Materials" conference which was held in Austin Texas.

She moved to Western Washington State College in Bellingham where she became a full professor in 1969. She nominally retired in the 1970s but also took up positions at other universities.

Swineford was a mineralogist and more particularly a Kansas geologist. She and John Frye studied loess. She was involved in the controversy that argued over the nature of loesse formation. She and Frye looked at the particle size of loesse and compared it with local dust. They found a high degree of similarity and this strengthened the evidence of Russell's theory that they had been formed from dust.

The mineral Swinefordite is named after her. The clay is said to have the consistency of Vaseline and is found in a mine in North Carolina. The clay is rich in lithium and was discovered by one of her students.
