= Little Jerusalem Badlands State Park =

State park in Kansas, United States

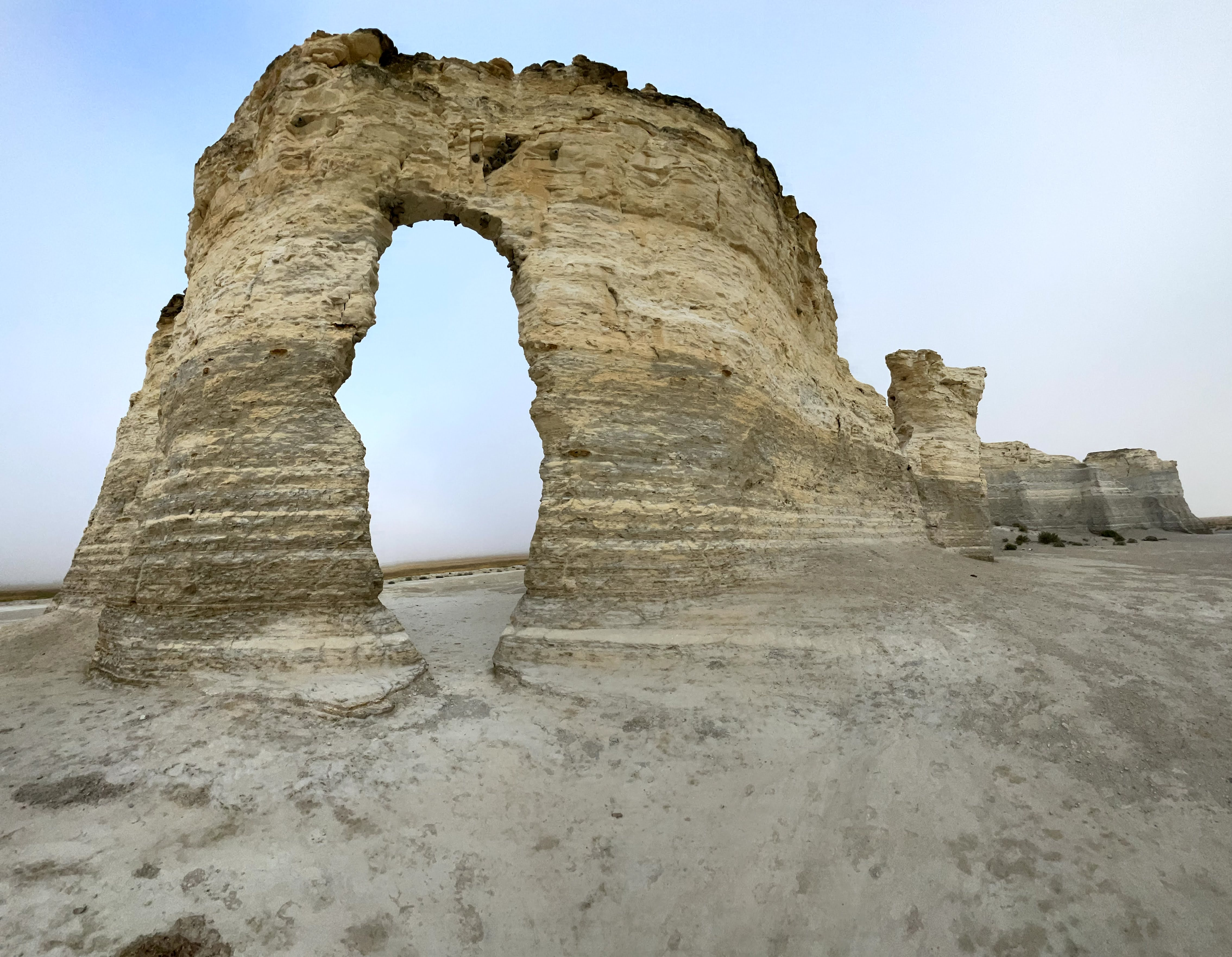
- Natural rock arch in the park

- Location within Kansas Location within the United States
- Interactive map of Little Jerusalem Badlands State Park
- Location: Logan County, Kansas, United States
- Coordinates: 38°48′09″N 100°56′33″W
- Area: 330 acres (130 ha)
- Established: 2018
- Administrator: The Nature Conservancy, Kansas Department of Wildlife and Parks
- Visitors: 17,465 (in 2022)
- Website: Official website
- Kansas State Parks

Little Jerusalem Badlands State Park is a 330 acres (130 ha) state park in Logan County, Kansas, United States. It is owned by The Nature Conservancy and located about 25 miles (40 km) south of Oakley and a similar distance north of Scott City.

The park features 220 acres (89 ha) of Smoky Hill Chalk badlands with many narrow canyons in white rock likened to the walls and narrow winding streets of ancient Jerusalem. Little Jerusalem Badlands State Park is open year-round during daylight hours only. Visitors are not allowed off-trail unless accompanied by park staff on a guided tour.

== See also ==
Nearby Smoky Hill Chalk natural monuments:

- Castle Rock (Kansas)
- Monument Rocks (Kansas)
