= Smoky Hill Chalk =

Geological formation in the United States

- Stratigraphic range: Late Coniacian-Early Campanian
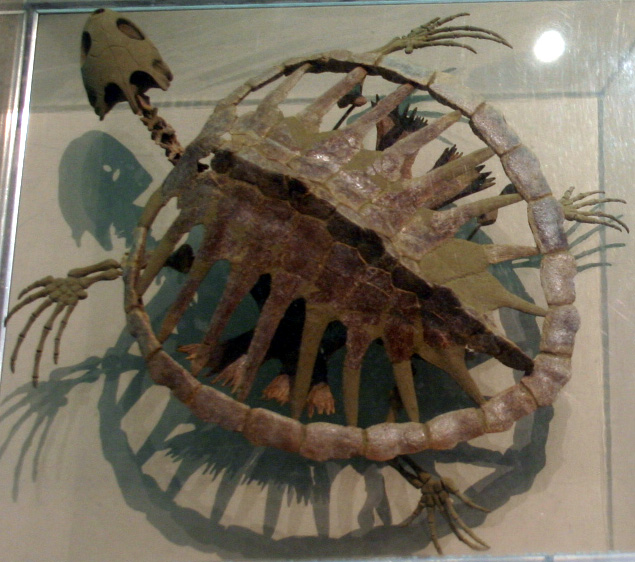
- This fossil of Prionochelys, an extinct marine turtle, is held in the Smithsonian's National Museum of Natural History. Many Smoky Hill Chalk vertebrate fossils have found their ways to natural history museums all over the world.
- Type: Geological member
- Unit of: Niobrara Formation

Lithology
- Primary: In Kansas, chalky and marly limestones, chalk, and chalky shale; elsewhere, less chalky

Location
- Coordinates: 38°48′09″N 100°56′33″W
- Region: mid-continental
- Country: United States

Type section
- Named for: Smoky Hill River
- Named by: F.W. Cragin
- Year defined: 1896

The Smoky Hill Chalk Member of the Niobrara Chalk formation is a Cretaceous conservation Lagerstätte, or fossil rich geological member, known primarily for its exceptionally well-preserved marine reptiles. Named for the Smoky Hill River, the Smoky Hill Chalk Member is the uppermost of the two structural units of the Niobrara Chalk. It is underlain by the Fort Hays Limestone Member and overlain by the Pierre Shale. The Smoky Hill Chalk outcrops in parts of northwest Kansas, its most famous localities for fossils, and in southeastern Nebraska. Large well-known fossils excavated from the Smoky Hill Chalk include marine reptiles such as plesiosaurs, large bony fish such as Xiphactinus, mosasaurs, flying reptiles or pterosaurs (namely Pteranodon), flightless marine birds such as Hesperornis, and turtles. Many of the most well-known specimens of the marine reptiles were collected by dinosaur hunter Charles H. Sternberg and his son George. The son collected a unique fossil of the giant bony fish Xiphactinus audax with the skeleton of another bony fish, Gillicus arcuatus inside the larger one. Another excellent skeleton of Xiphactinus audax was collected by Edward Drinker Cope during the late nineteenth century heyday of American paleontology and its Bone Wars.

== Viewing and access ==
The general type area, the Smoky Hill River watershed in Logan and Gove Counties, has many badlands eroded into the Smoky Hill Chalk.

Some natural monuments of Smoky Hill Chalk in Kansas with public daylight access

- Castle Rock
- Little Jerusalem Badlands State Park
- Monument Rocks
