= Monument Rocks (Kansas) =

National Natural Landmark

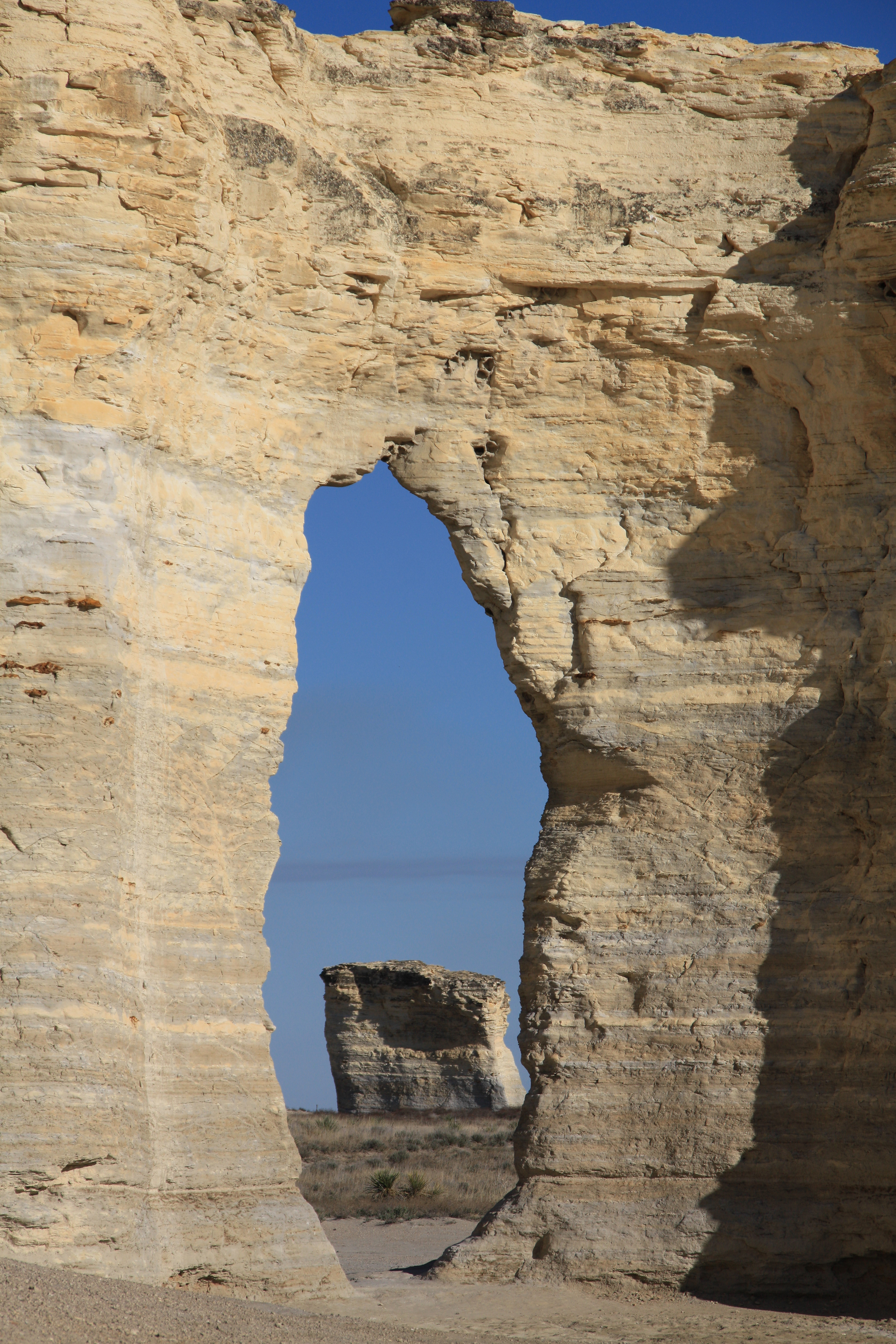
- View of the Monument Rocks

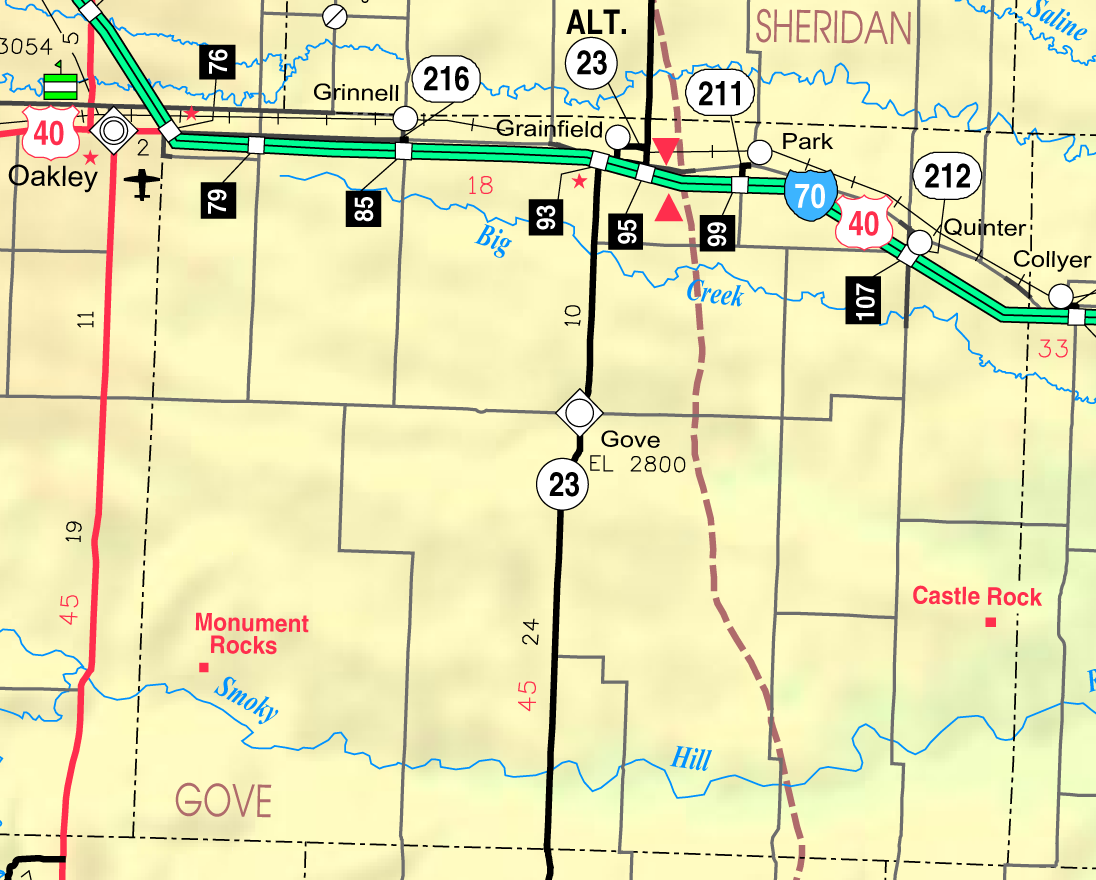
- Map showing location of Monument Rocks
- Location: South of Oakley, Kansas, Gove County, Smoky Hills, Kansas, United States
- Coordinates: 38°47′26″N 100°45′45″W
- Elevation: 802 m (2,631 ft)
- Established: National Natural Landmark
- Website: Washburn University website

U.S. National Natural Landmark
- Designated: 1968

Monument Rocks (also Chalk Pyramids) are a series of large chalk formations in Gove County, Kansas, rich in fossils. The formations were the first landmark in Kansas chosen by the U.S. Department of the Interior as a National Natural Landmark. The chalk formations reach a height of up to 70 ft (21 m) and include formations such as buttes and arches. The carbonate deposits were laid down during the Cretaceous Period in what was then the Western Interior Seaway, which split the continent of North America into two landmasses. They are estimated to have been formed 80 million years ago.

== History ==
On January 29, 2008, Monument Rocks, 25 miles south of Oakley, Kansas, and Castle Rock, 31 miles to the east, were jointly named as one of the 8 Wonders of Kansas.

== Gallery ==
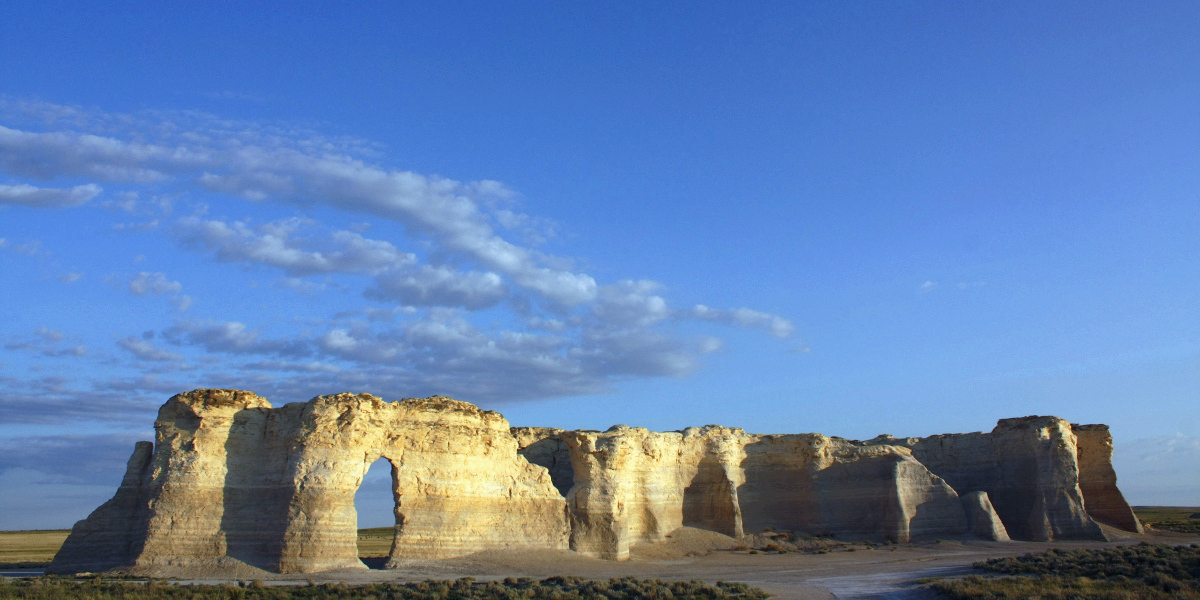
Wide view of largest formation and arch

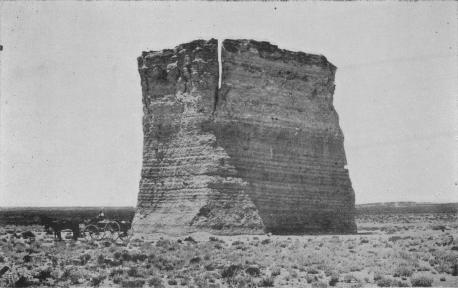
Southernmost rock in the early 1890s

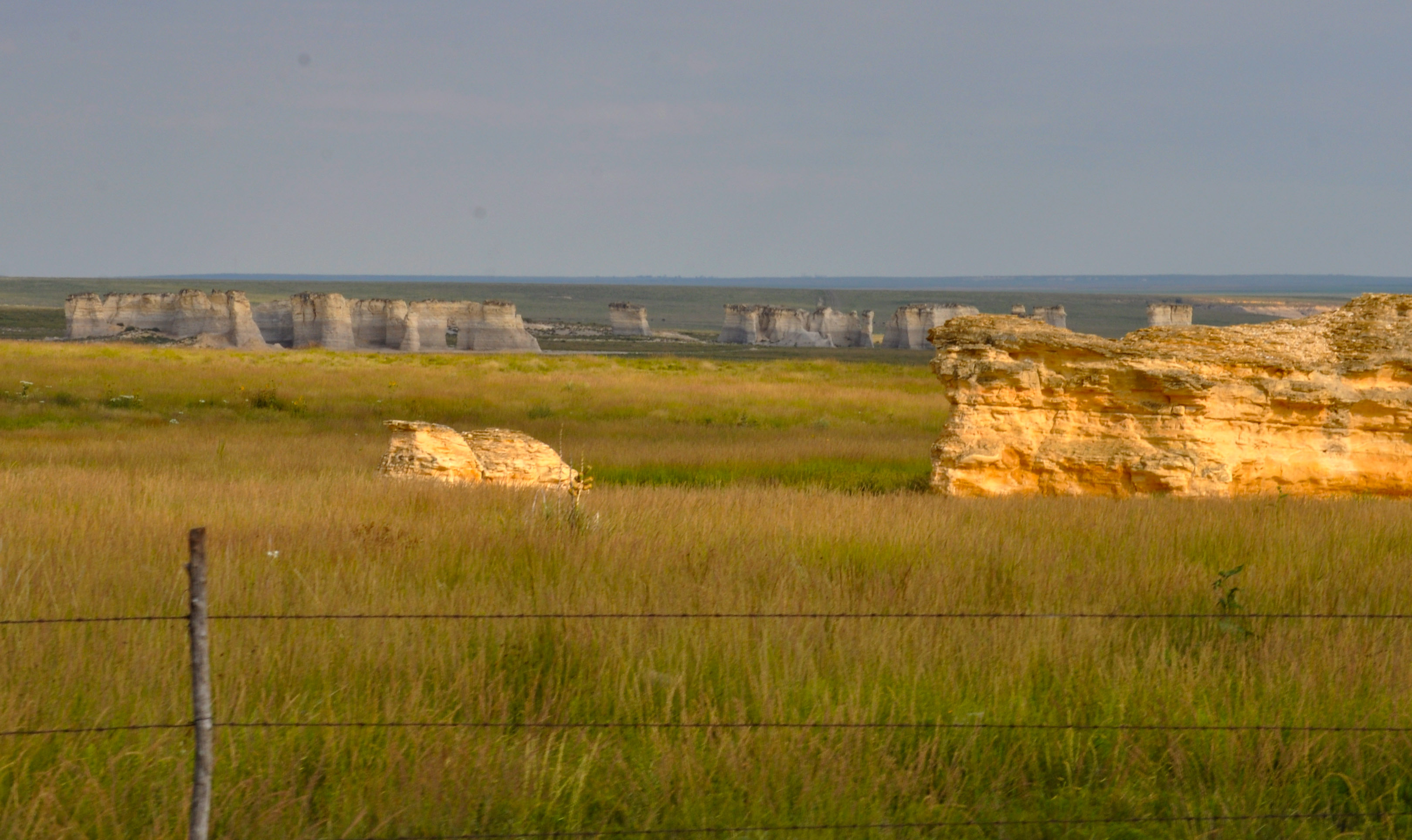
Wide view from the west

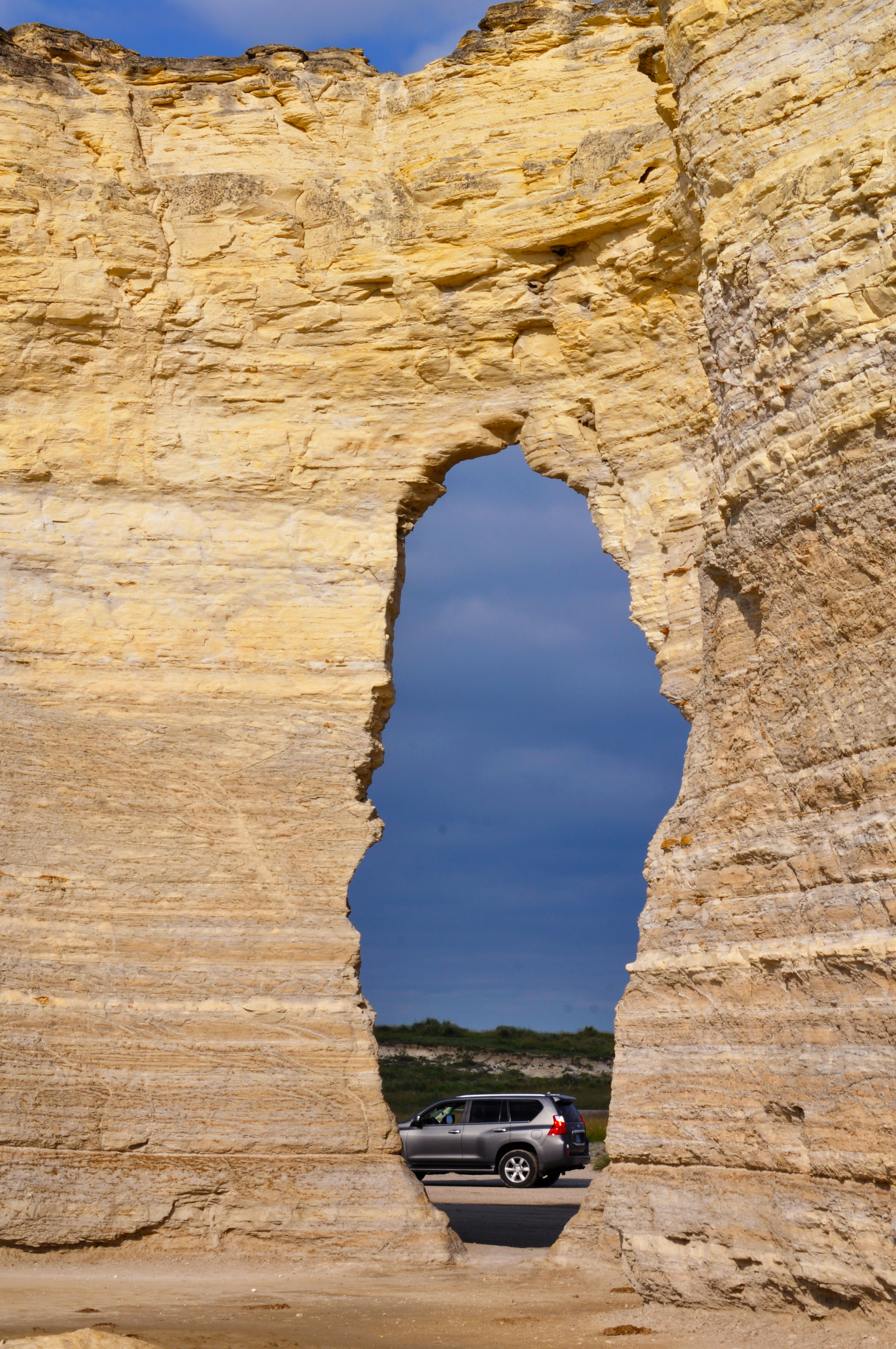
With car for scale

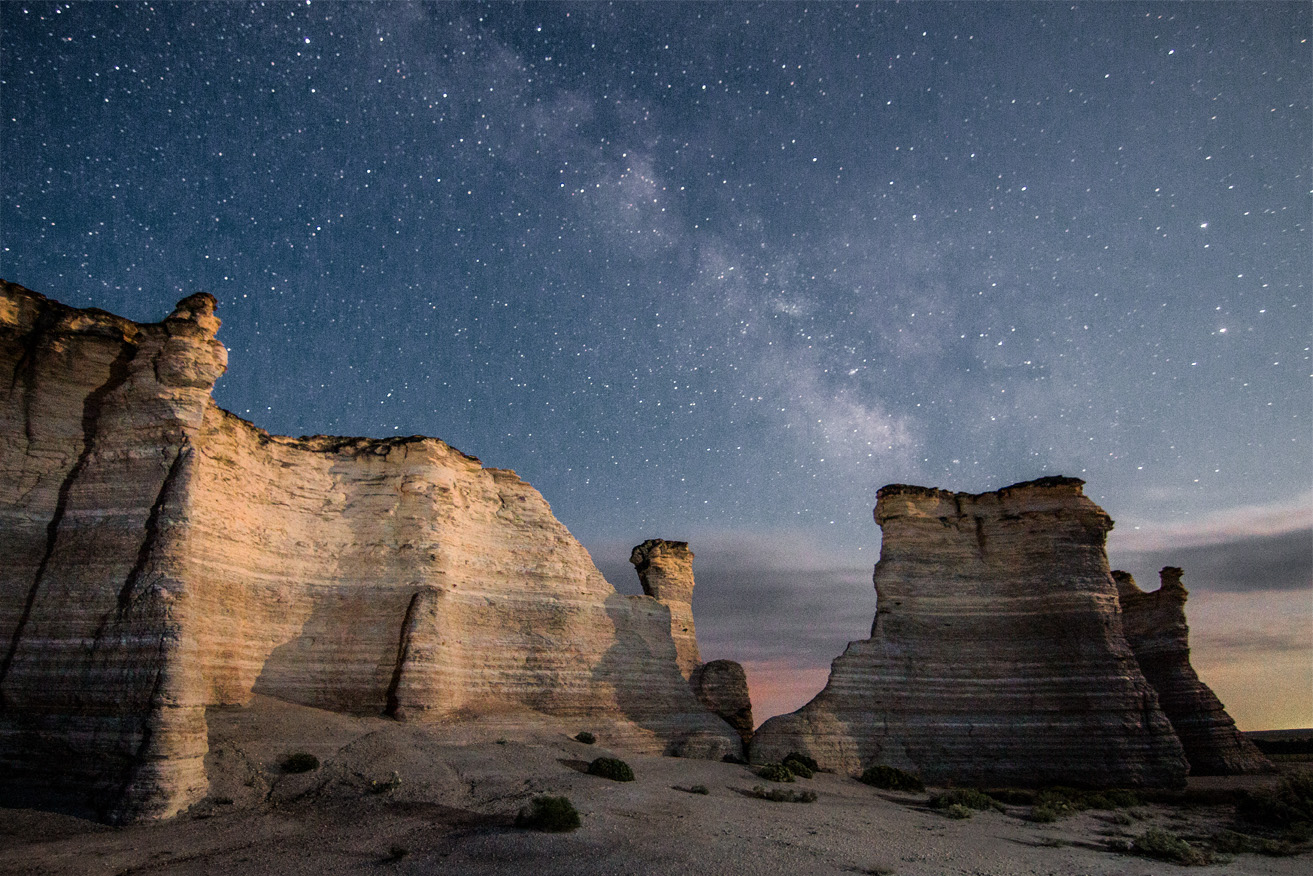
Night view with Milky Way

== See also ==
Other geological formations in Kansas:

- Castle Rock (Kansas)
- Little Jerusalem Badlands State Park
- Mushroom Rock State Park
- Rock City, Kansas
- Big Basin Prairie Preserve
