= K131 jeep =

K131
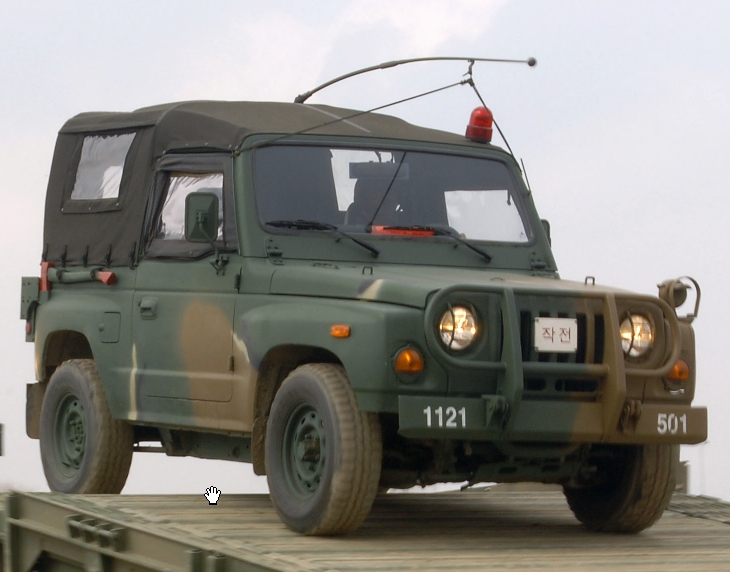

Overview
- Manufacturer: Kia Motors
- Also called: KM420
- Production: 1997–present

Body and chassis
- Layout: FR layout
- Related: Kia Retona

Powertrain
- Engine: 2.0L Mazda FE-DOHC I4

Dimensions
- Wheelbase: 2,360 mm (92.9 in)
- Length: 4,006 mm (157.7 in)
- Width: 1,745 mm (68.7 in)
- Height: 1,890 mm (74.4 in)
- Curb weight: 1,580 kg (3,483 lb)

Chronology
- Predecessor: K111

The K131 Jeep, alternately KM420, is a light utility vehicle manufactured by Kia Motors in South Korea. The Kia K131 Jeep was designed and developed by Asia Motors, and it started being delivered to the South Korean army in 1997 as the replacement for its predecessor, the K111 jeep. Its civilian version is known as the Kia Retona, and was sold between 1998 and 2003. The 42 series vehicles are 1/4 ton capacity and are available in various configurations, serving since 1997. A toy version is sold as part of a larger construction toy set sold by Oxford Toy in South Korea.

== Operators ==
- Bangladesh
- Cambodia
- Chile: Chilean Marine Corps
- South Korea
- Peru
- Indonesia
- Lebanon

== See also ==
- Humvee – (United States)
- Land Rover Wolf – (United Kingdom)
- Land Rover Perentie – (Australia)
- G-Wagon – (Germany)
- Iveco LMV – (Italy)
- URO VAMTAC – (Spain)
- Tarpan Honker – (Poland)
- Jeep J8 – (United States)
- AIL Storm – (Israel)
- Mitsubishi Type 73 light truck – (Japan)
- UAZ-469 – (Soviet Union)
- BJ2022 – (China)
- Agrale Marruá – (Brazil)
- Tiuna – (Venezuela)
- Fath Safir – (Iran)
