= K100 =

K100 or K-100 may refer to:

== Military ==
- CAC K100, mini-UAV developed in France in the 1990s
- FFL Alysse (K100) or French corvette Alysse, lent by the Royal Navy to the Free French Naval Forces
- Grandpower K100, a Slovak made pistol
- K-100 (missile), a Russian air-to-air missile
- K100 Jeep, a Korean produced military Jeep by Shinjin Jeep Motor Company.

== Radio stations ==
- CIOK-FM, a radio station in Saint John, New Brunswick, Canada
- KKLQ (FM), a radio station in Los Angeles, California formerly known as K100
- WKBE, radio station in Warrensburg, New York formerly known as K-100
- WKKO, country radio station in Toledo, Ohio
- K100, former train number of Shanghai-Kowloon Through Train
- K100, radio station in Reykjavík, Iceland formerly known as Kaninn

== Other uses ==
- Bank of Zambia K100 note, one hundred kwacha note of Zambia
- BMW K100, a motorcycle manufactured by BMW
- K-100 (TV series), a Hong Kong television programme
- K100, a former model of cabover truck made by Kenworth
- K-100 (Kansas highway), a former state highway in Kansas
- Timm K-100 Collegiate American-built two-seat light aircraft of the late 1920s
