= K111 =

K111 or K-111 may refer to:

- K-111 (Kansas highway), a state highway in Kansas
- K111 Jeep, a Korean made military Jeep.
- Symphony, K. 111+120 (Mozart)
