= List of equipment of the Peruvian Army =

Military equipment list

This is a list of equipment used by the Peruvian Army.

== Personal Gears ==
Personal Equipment
Name	Type	Images	Notes
UNIPAT	MultiCam | Combat uniform		Current standard issued.
AMAPAT	Tiger stripe camouflage | Combat uniform		Standard issue, alongside with UNIPAT. It looks as same as WAVEPAT, the standarized camouflage of ROK Marine Corps.
MultiCam	MultiCam| Combat uniform		For transitional and temporary change.
ACH helmet Scalable Plate Carrier	Combat helmet | Plate carrier		Standard issued.

== Infantry weapons ==
=== Pistols ===
Model	Image	Caliber	Origin	Type	Details
Taurus PT92	800x308	9×19mm Parabellum	Brazil	Semi-automatic pistol	PT92AFD and PT92AFD-M, standard sidearm of the Peruvian Army, Special Forces.
Browning Hi-Power	800x308	9×19mm Parabellum	Belgium	Semi-automatic pistol	General Issue sidearm
Glock 17	800x308	9×19mm Parabellum	Austria	Semi-automatic pistol	Limited use as a sidearm

=== Shotguns ===
Model	Image	Caliber	Origin	Type	Details
Winchester 1300		12-gauge	United States	Pump-action shotgun	Parachute Commandos and Special Forces

=== Assault rifles and carbines ===
Model	Image	Caliber	Origin	Type	Details
AKM		7.62×39mm	USSR	Assault rifle	Standard issue rifle of military police.
Type 68		7.62×39mm	North Korea	Assault rifle	
MPi-KM 72		7.62×39mm	East Germany	Assault rifle	
FN F2000		5.56×45mm NATO	Belgium	Bullpup; Assault rifle	Special forces
IWI Galil ACE		5.56×45mm NATO	Israel	Assault rifle	
Galil MAR		5.56×45mm NATO	Israel	Assault rifle	Special forces
Galil SAR		5.56×45mm NATO	Israel	Assault rifle	Special forces
IWI Tavor		5.56×45mm NATO	Israel	Bullpup; Assault rifle	
M16A2		5.56×45mm NATO	United States	Assault rifle	
SOAR		5.56×45mm NATO	United States	Assault rifle	
SAR-21		5.56×45mm NATO	Singapore	Bullpup; Assault rifle	Special forces.
Zastava M21		5.56×45mm NATO	Serbia	Assault rifle	

=== Battle and sniper rifles ===
Model	Image	Caliber	Origin	Type	Details
L96A1		7.62×51mm NATO	United Kingdom	Sniper rifle	
Barrett M82		.50 BMG	United States	Anti-materiel rifle	
FAL 50.00; FAL 50.41 / FALO		7.62×51mm NATO	Belgium	Battle rifle	
FN FAL 50.62		7.62×51mm NATO	Belgium	Battle rifle	Standard issue rifle
Heckler & Koch G3		7.62×51mm NATO	West Germany	Battle rifle	
McMillan TAC-50		.50 BMG	United States	Anti-materiel rifle	Special forces
MPT-76MH		7.62x51mm NATO	Turkey	Assault rifle	Special forces
SR-25		7.62×51mm NATO	United States	Designated marksman rifle	Special forces
SR-99 Galatz		7.62×51mm NATO	Israel	Sniper rifle	
Steyr SSG 69		7.62×51mm NATO	Austria	Sniper rifle	

=== Submachine guns ===
Model	Image	Caliber	Origin	Type	Details
Star Model Z-45		9×23mm Largo	Francoist Spain	Submachine gun	
Milkor BXP		9×19mm Parabellum	South Africa	Submachine gun	Special forces.
Heckler & Koch MP5		9×19mm Parabellum	West Germany	Submachine gun	MP5A4 MP5A5 MP5SD MP5K
FN P90		FN 5.7×28mm	Belgium	Submachine gun Personal defense weapon	Parachute Commandos and Special Forces
Uzi		9×19mm Parabellum	Israel	Submachine gun	
FMK-3		9×19mm Parabellum	National Reorganization Process	Submachine gun	

=== Machine guns ===
Model	Image	Caliber	Origin	Type	Details
FN Minimi		5.56×45mm NATO	Belgium	Squad automatic weapon	
Ultimax 100		5.56×45mm NATO	Singapore	Squad automatic weapon	
Mini-SS		5.56×45mm NATO	South Africa	General purpose machine gun	Special forces
Browning M1919A4; Browning M1919A4A6		.30-06 Springfield	United States	Medium machine gun	
Heckler & Koch HK21E		7.62×51mm NATO	West Germany	General purpose machine gun	
RPD		7.62×39mm	Soviet Union	Squad automatic weapon	
PK; PKM		7.62×54mmR	Soviet Union	General purpose machine gun	
RPK-74		5.45×39mm	Soviet Union	Squad automatic weapon	
FN MAG		7.62×51mm NATO	Belgium	General purpose machine gun	
Browning M2		.50 BMG	United States	Heavy machine gun	
M134 Minigun		7.62×51mm NATO	United States	Rotary; Medium machine gun	

=== Portable anti-materiel weapons ===
Model	Image	Caliber	Origin	Type	Details
RPG-22		72.5 mm	USSR	Rocket-propelled grenade	Standard RPG for anti-tank teams alongside RPG-7
RPG-7V		85 mm	USSR	Rocket-propelled grenade	Standard RPG for anti-tank teams. Airtronic RPG-7 and RPG-7V variants
Alcotán-100		100 mm	Spain	Anti-tank rocket launcher	74 launchers with 660 rockets, for cavalry, mountain infantry, special forces
Panzerfaust 3		110 mm	West Germany	Anti-tank rocket launcher	181 launchers with 1,700 rockets, for armoured infantry and special forces

== Armoured fighting vehicles ==
Name	Image	Origin	In service	Notes
Main battle tanks
K2 Black Panther		South Korea	0/54	Hyundai Rotem signed an agreement with Peru (through FAME S.A.C.,16 Nov 2024) to supply K2 tanks and K808 armored vehicles. Beginning in October 2026, there is a option that the K2 will be cancelled.
T-55		USSR	~280	75+ in store
Light tanks
AMX-13		France	~108	Originally 108 of which 78 armed with the 105 mm cannon while 30 with the 75 mm, the 75 mm armed vehicles have been phased out since 2009 and some were used for the Alacrán projects.Some with 9M133 Kornet-E
Reconnaissance
BRDM-2		USSR	~30	
Fiat 6616		Italy	~15	
M9A1		United States	~50	
Armoured personnel carriers
K808		South Korea	0/141	Hyundai Rotem has signed an agreement with Peru to supply K2 tanks and K808 armored vehicles. Beginning in October 2026, there was an option that the K808 will be cancelled.
UR-416		West Germany	~150	
Fiat 6614		Italy	~25	
M113A1		United States	~120	
BTR-50		USSR	some	CP

== Engineering & maintenance vehicles ==
Name	Image	Origin	In service	Notes
Armored recovery vehicles
M578		United States	?	
Armoured vehicle-launched bridges
GQL-111		China	?	

== Anti-tank-anti-infrastructure ==
Name	Image	Origin	caliber	In service	Notes
missile carriers
M1165A2		United States	152mm	~22	with 9K135 Kornet E
missiles
HJ-73C		China	120mm	?	
9K11 Malyutka		USSR	125mm	?	
9K135 Kornet E		Russia	152mm	?	
Spike-ER		Israel	170mm	?	
recoilless rifles
M40A1		United States	106mm	?	

== Artillery ==
Name	Image	Origin	caliber	In service	Notes
self-propelled howitzers
M109A2		United States	155mm	~12	
towed howitzers
M101		United States	105mm	~44	
M2A1		United States	105mm	~24	
M-56		Yugoslavia	105mm	~60	
Model 56		Italy	105mm	~24	
D-30		USSR	122mm	~36	
M-46		USSR	130mm	~36	
M114		United States	155mm	~36	
Model 50		France	155mm	~30	
multiple rocket launchers
BM-21 Grad		USSR	122mm	~22	
Type-90B		China	122mm	~27	
PULS (multiple rocket launcher)		ISR	122-370mm		To be locally produced
mortars
?		?	81mm	~350	
?		?	107mm	~350	
M106A1		United States	107mm	~24	
Expal Model L		France; Spain	120mm	300+	

== Air defense ==
Name	Image	Origin	caliber	In service	Notes
Surface-to-air missiles
9K310 Igla-1		USSR	72mm	?	
9K32 Strela-2		USSR	72mm	?	
9K36 Strela-3		USSR	72mm	?	
self-propelled anti-aircraft guns
ZSU-23-4		USSR	23mm	~35	
towed anti aircraft guns
ZU-23-2		USSR	23mm	~80	
ZU-23		USSR	23mm	~50	

== Army aviation ==
Aircraft	Image	Origin	In service	Notes
Transport
An-32		USSR	3	
Beech 1900		United States	1	
Cessna 208		United States	1	
Citation XLS		United States	1	
King Air 350		United States	1	
Combat helicopter
AW109		Italy	1	
Mi-8		USSR	43	
Mi-17		Russia	43	
Mi-171		Russia	43	
Mi-2		Polish People's Republic	1	
Training aircraft/helicopters
Enstrom 280		United States	1	
Enstrom F-28		United States	2	
R44		United States	1	
