= Battle of Checkpoint Pasta =

Battle during the Somali Civil War

- Part of the Somali Civil War and the UNOSOM II mission
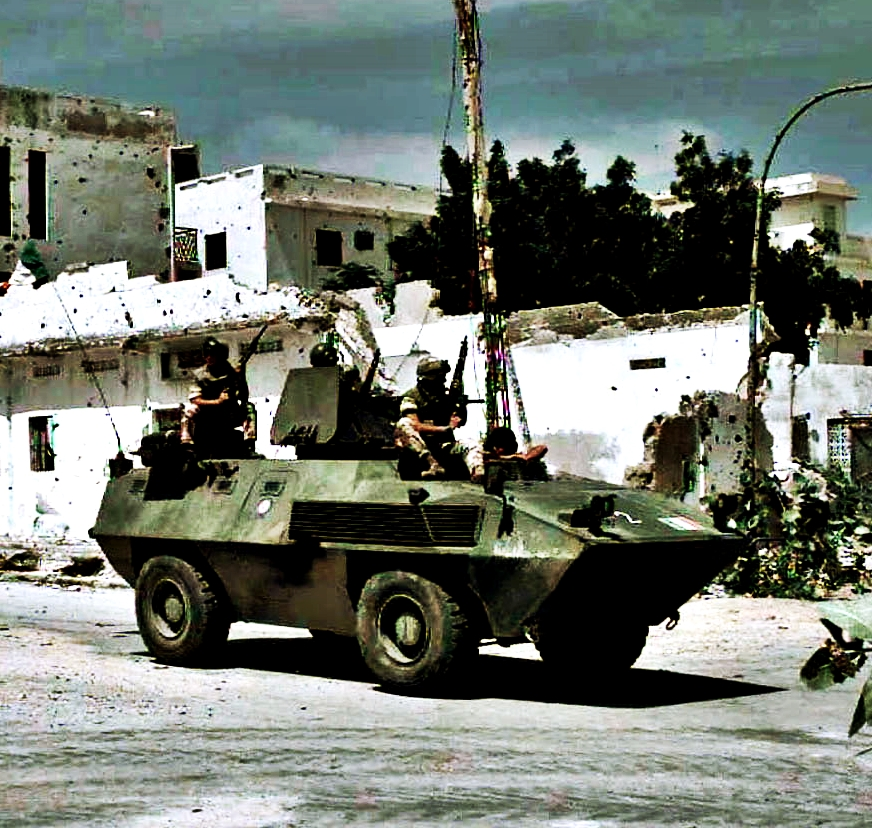
- Italian Fiat-OTO Melara Type 6614 Armored Personnel Carrier in a street of Mogadishu (1993)
Date	2 July 1993
Location	Mogadishu, Somalia
Result	SNA victory: Italian officers negotiate ceasefire and withdraw; Insurgents seize numerous checkpoints; The Italian Army re-occupied the positions on 9 July, after negotiations with the SNA

Belligerents
Italy; Somalia	SNA

Commanders and leaders
Bruno Loi; Ali Mahdi Muhammad	Mohamed Farrah Aidid

Strength
800 Italian troops + 400 Somali policemen	Around 600 rebel Somali militiamen

Casualties and losses
3 killed 29 wounded	67 killed 187 wounded

The Battle of Checkpoint Pasta, sometimes called the Battle of the Pasta Factory, was a firefight in Mogadishu between Italian troops under UNOSOM II and insurgents of the Somali National Alliance (SNA), and is remembered for being the first all-out battle involving the Italian Army since the end of the Second World War. The battle took place near the Italian checkpoint called "Pasta", because it was located near an abandoned Barilla pasta factory across the intersection of Imperial Street and 21 October Street, after an ambush on Italian forces was set up by Somali insurgents led by General Mohamed Farrah Aidid.

During the battle the SNA forced the Italians to vacate their positions and then seized several checkpoints and controlled nearly a square mile of Mogadishu previously held by UNOSOM. Following ceasefire talks with the SNA after four hours of fighting, Italian troops withdrew. After negotiating with the SNA, the Italians re-occupied Checkpoint Pasta a week later. The Italian government ceased offensive operations against the SNA after the battle.

== Context ==
On July 2, 1993, during the development of "Operation Kangaroo 11", planned by the command "ITALFOR", Italian forces split into two mechanized columns to carry out a search for weapons in the Haliwaa district, a district north of Mogadishu. Some targets were located near an abandoned Barilla pasta factory, near which a checkpoint had been set up, on the crossroads between Via Imperiale and Strada 21 October, called "Pasta". 800 Italian troops, armed with tanks, APCs and helicopter gunships, while also being supported by 400 Somali policeman, partook in the operation.

== Operation ==
The first column, called Alfa, came from the old port of Mogadishu while the second, Bravo, from the city of Balad, another important Italian garrison during the mission, was located about twenty kilometers from Mogadishu. The target of the patrol was an area of 400 by 700 meters between Checkpoint Ferro and Pasta.

Once the patrol operation was over, the two columns went back to base. Serious unrest broke out in the area, among which snipers mingled. The situation deteriorated to such an extent for Somali law enforcement that the intervention by the Bravo column was necessary, which at that time was in the vicinity of the pasta factory along the Via Imperiale.

=== Militia ambush ===
Some Italian VCC-1 Camillino armored personnel carriers stopped in front of barricades erected by the Somali militiamen. They were immobilized with anti-tank rockets while the surrounding streets were blocked with other barricades. In one of these, paratrooper Pasquale Baccaro died, hit in the leg by a rocket, when his vehicle was hit by an RPG-7. Sergeant Major Giampiero Monti was seriously injured in the abdomen and paratrooper Massimiliano Zaniolo received a bullet wound in his hand.

The rescue intervention of the Alfa column was therefore decided, equipped with eight M60 tanks, Fiat 6614 armored cars and seven B1 Centauro tank destroyers. Further support came from Agusta A129 Mangusta and Bell UH-1 Iroquois helicopters. Armored vehicle crews tried to protect other vehicles and injured comrades using onboard machine guns, while also trying to restart one of the damaged vehicles with men still patrolling the neighborhood; it was at this stage that the Raider Sergeant Stefano Paolicchi was mortally wounded while clearing a militias' dugout with an OD 82/SE hand grenade.

Heavy armament was used only on two occasions: an unspecified number of M60s from a company of the 32nd Tank Regiment from the 132nd Armored Brigade "Ariete" opened fire on containers that served as a shield for the militiamen, causing great losses, and one of the Mangustas destroyed an Iveco VM 90 seized by the Somali militias with a TOW missile, killing all the rebels aboard.

=== Withdrawal ===
Among the men of the rescue column, the Second Lieutenant Andrea Millevoi, commander of a Centauro tank destroyer platoon of the 8th "Lancieri di Montebello" Regiment, was shot and killed as he leaned out of his vehicle to check out the area. A large number of civilians arrived and were used as human shields by the militiamen. The arrival of rescue armored vehicles allowed the soldiers under fire to withdraw. After four hours of fighting, the Italian commander negotiated a ceasefire with the Somali insurgents to allow the withdrawal of his troops.

== Losses and aftermath ==
The Washington Post reported after the battle that, "...the Somali fighters won the day, forcing the Italian soldiers to flee." The Italians would not retake the position until a week later on the 9th of July after negotiating with the Somali National Alliance. After the battle, the Italian government ordered its troops in Somalia to cease offensive actions against the SNA. The Italians lost three soldiers during that day of battle:

- Andrea Millevoi, Second Lieutenant of the Regiment "Lancieri di Montebello" (8th), Gold medal for military valor;
- Stefano Paolicchi, Sergeant Major of the 9th Paratroopers Assault Regiment "Col Moschin", Gold medal for military valor;
- Pasquale Baccaro, Corporal of the 186th Paratroopers Regiment "Folgore", Gold medal for military valor.

In addition, 22 were injured and an unknown number of Somali militiamen and civilians were killed or injured. In the 2008 documentary Checkpoint Pasta by director Andrea Bettinetti, Somali sources say 67 militiamen were killed and at least 103 were injured.

Among the Italians wounded, there was also the then Second Lieutenant Gianfranco Paglia, paratrooper, who during the action was hit by three bullets while trying to rescue the crew of one of the immobilized armored cars. One bullet entered the lung which caused internal bleeding, and one hit the spinal cord which forced him to use a wheelchair afterwards. He was awarded the Gold Medal for military valor for the action. Despite having lost the use of his legs, he is still in service in the Italian Army. The paratrooper and Sergeant Major Giampiero Monti, seriously injured in the abdomen, was awarded the Silver Medal of Military Valor. Other silver and bronze medals were awarded to various members of the Bersaglieri and helicopter pilots engaged in the action. A few days after the clash, on 9 July, the Italians re-occupied the checkpoints, including Checkpoint Pasta.

== Reasons for the battle ==
According to some reconstructions, never confirmed by official sources, the clashes erupted because the area of operations conducted by Italian forces was the refuge of General Mohammed Farah Aidid, one of the main Somali warlords and considered a major obstacle to reaching a peace agreement. The order from Aidid to his militiamen would have been to kick off the clashes, so as to allow him to flee the area.

== See also ==
- Battle of Mogadishu (1993)

== Bibliography ==
- Mannucci, Enrico (2004). In pace e in guerra. Milano: Longanesi & C. ISBN 88-304-2136-7.
