= Centauro (Tank destroyer) =

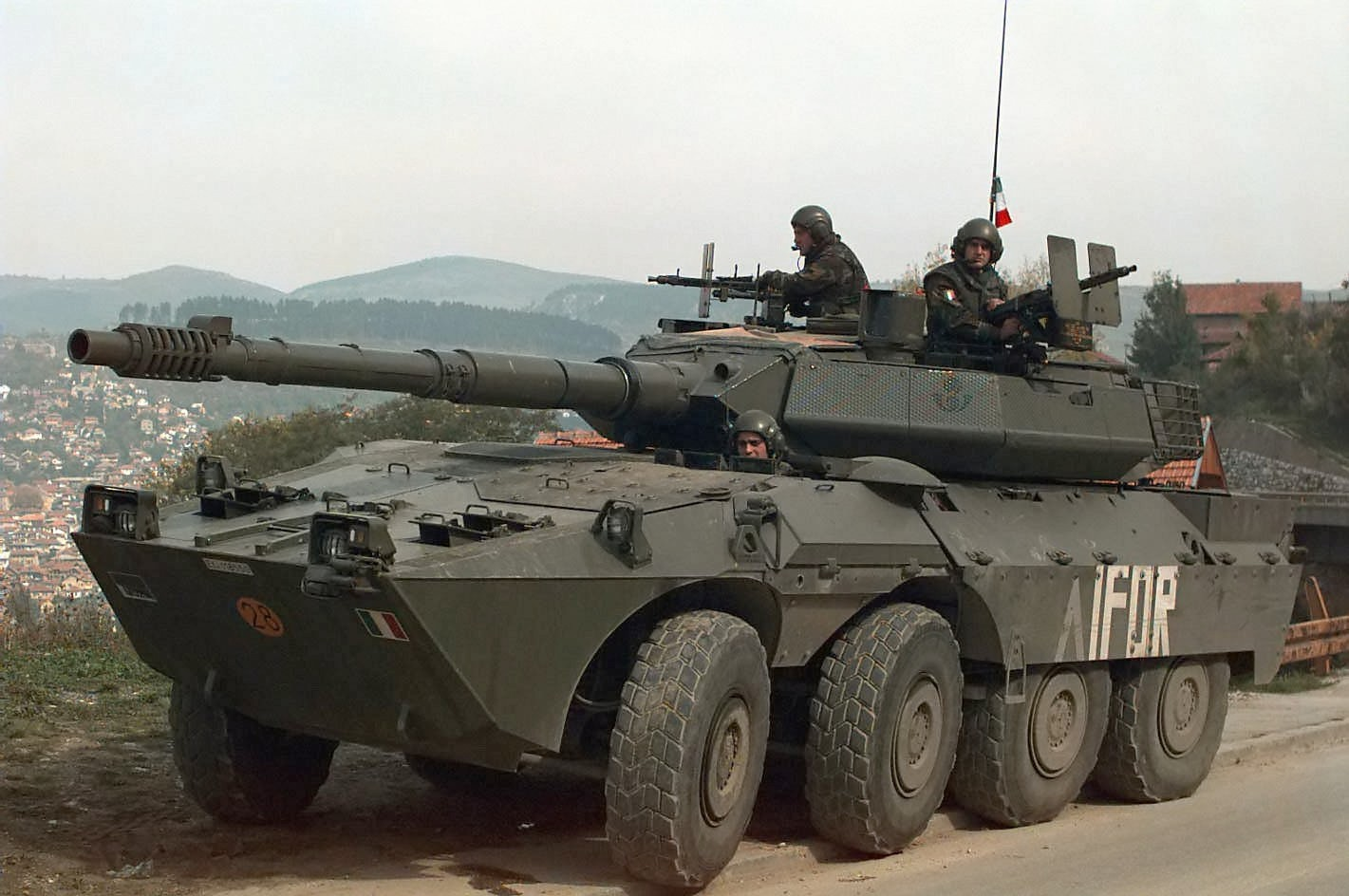
- An Italian Army Centauro during a patrol in Bosnia-Herzegovina as part of IFOR in 1996
- Type: Wheeled tank destroyer
- Place of origin: Italy

Service history
- In service: 1991 - present
- Used by: See Operators
- Wars: United Nations Operation in Somalia II; Implementation Force; Kosovo Force; Iraq War; UNIFIL (United Nations Interim Force in Lebanon); Russo-Ukrainian war

Production history
- Designed: 1986
- Manufacturer: Iveco Fiat (hull, propulsion); Oto Melara (weapons, turrets)
- Unit cost: €1.6 million
- Produced: Centauro: 1991–2006; Centauro 2: 2021–present
- No. built: 490+ (plus 249 Freccia)
- Variants: See Variants

Specifications
- Mass: Centauro 1: 24 t (24 long tons; 26 short tons); Centauro 2: 30 t (30 long tons; 33 short tons)
- Length: Centauro 1: 7.85 m (25 ft 9 in); Centauro 2: 8.26 m (27 ft 1 in)
- Width: Centauro 1: 2.94 m (9 ft 8 in); Centauro 2: 3.12 m (10 ft 3 in)
- Height: Centauro 1: 2.73 m (8 ft 11 in); Centauro 2: 3.65 m (12 ft 0 in)
- Crew: 4 (commander, gunner, loader and driver)
- Armor: Welded steel armoured hull
- Main armament: Centauro 1: Oto Melara 105 mm/52 (rifled); Centauro 2: Oto Melara 120mm L/45 LRF (smoothbore)
- Secondary armament: Centauro 1: Coaxial: 1 × GPMG (7.62×51mm NATO); Pintle: 1 × GPMG (7.62×51mm NATO); Centauro 2: Coaxial: 1 × GPMG (7.62×51mm NATO); RWS Hitrole Mod.L or pintle: 1 × GPMG or (7.62×51mm NATO / 12.7×99mm NATO)
- Engine: Centauro 1: Iveco VTCA V6, turbo-diesel engine (520 hp (390 kW)); Centauro 2: Iveco Vector 8V V8 engine (704 hp (525 kW))
- Payload capacity: 350 kg (770 lb)
- Transmission: Hydropneumatic automatic transmission with 5 forward and 2 reverse gears 8×8 wheels
- Suspension: independent MacPherson struts
- Operational range: 800 km (500 mi)
- Maximum speed: 108 km/h (67 mph)

The Centauro is a family of Italian military vehicles originating from a wheeled tank destroyer for light to medium territorial defense and tactical reconnaissance. It was developed by the Società Consortile Iveco Fiat – OTO Melara (CIO), a consortium of manufacturers, with Iveco Fiat tasked with developing the hull and propulsion systems, while Oto Melara was responsible for developing the turrets and weapon systems. The Centauro platform has been developed into multiple variants to fulfill other combat roles, such as infantry fighting vehicle or self-propelled howitzer.

== Description ==
The vehicle was developed in response to an Italian Army requirement for a tank destroyer with the firepower of the old Leopard 1 main battle tank then in service with the Italian Army, but with greater strategic mobility. The main mission of the Centauro is to protect other, lighter, elements of the cavalry, using its good power-to-weight ratio, excellent range and cross country ability (despite the wheeled design) and computerized fire control system to accomplish this mission. Centauro entered production in 1991 and deliveries were complete by 2006.

=== Armament ===
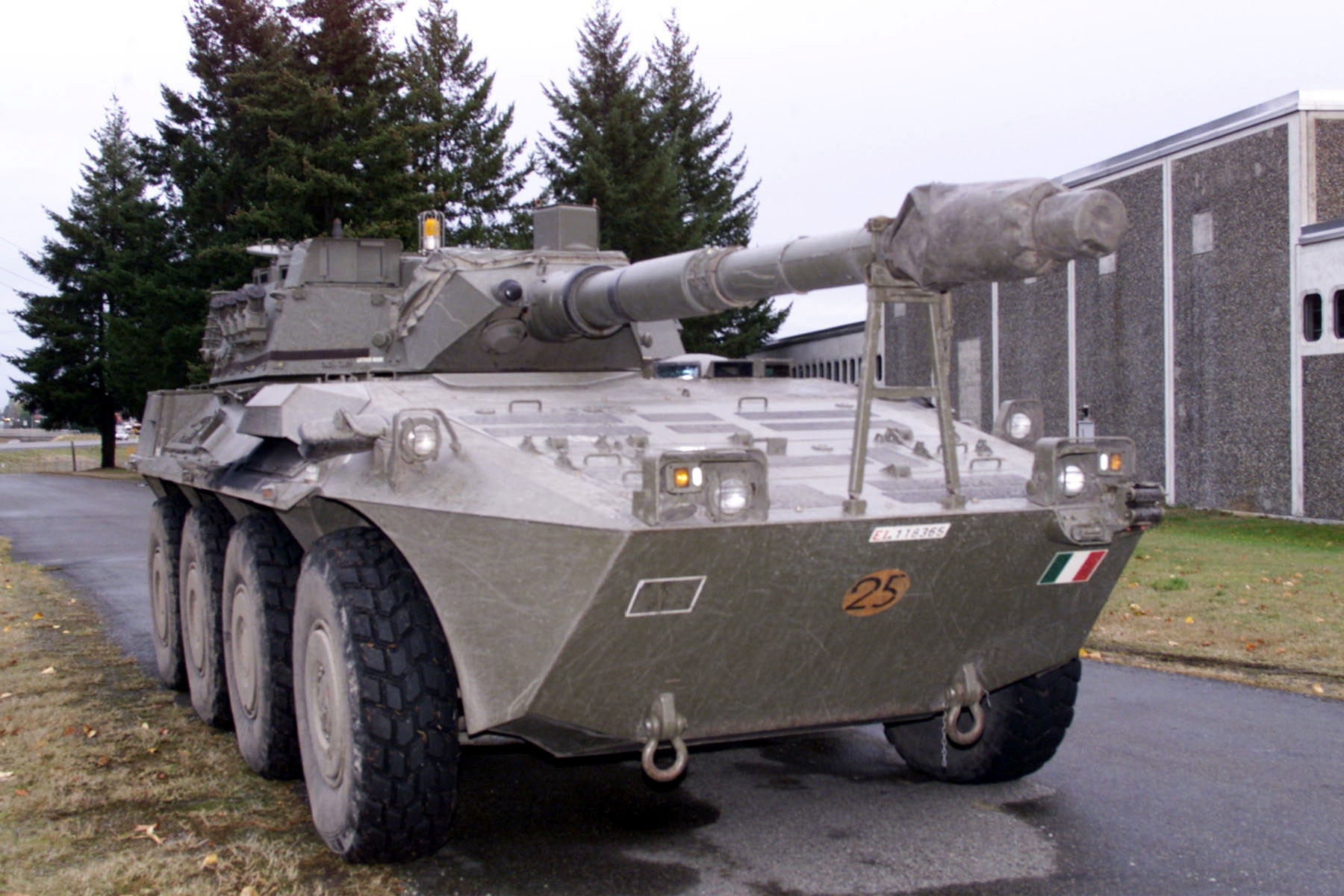
An early variant of the vehicle

The main armament consists of the Oto Melara 105 mm L/52 calibre gyro-stabilized high-pressure, low-recoil gun equipped with a thermal sleeve and an integrated fume extractor, with 40 rounds: 14 ready rounds in the turret and another 26 rounds in the hull. The gun can fire standard NATO ammunition, including APFSDS (Armour Piercing Fin-Stabilized Discarding Sabot) rounds.

Secondary weapons are a 7.62 mm coaxial machine gun, and a 7.62 mm anti-aircraft machine gun with 4,000 rounds of ammunition.

Aiming is provided by a Galileo Avionica TURMS fire control system (the same as fitted to the Italian Ariete tank), a muzzle referencing system, and a fully digital ballistic computer. The gunner's sight is fully stabilised and includes a thermal imager and laser rangefinder. The commander's station has a panoramic stabilised sight, an image-intensifying night sight, and a monitor displaying the image from the gunner's thermal sight. This allows Centauro, day or night, to engage stationary or moving targets while stationary or on the move.

=== Armour ===
The Centauro hull is an all-welded steel armoured hull, which in the baseline configuration is designed to withstand 14.5 mm bullets and shell fragments, with protection against 25 mm projectiles on the frontal section. The addition of bolt-on appliqué armour increases protection against 30 mm rounds.

The Centauro is also equipped with an CBRN (Chemical, Biological, Radiological, and Nuclear) warfare protection system, which is integrated with the vehicle's air conditioning system. The vehicle is also equipped with a four-barreled smoke grenade launcher mounted on each side of the turret and a laser warning receiver.

=== Propulsion ===
Centauro is powered by an Iveco V6 turbo-charged after-cooled diesel engine delivering 520 hp (382.4 kW). This drives a ZF-designed automatic transmission, which is manufactured under licence by Iveco Fiat. The transmission system has five forward and two reverse gears. This drives eight wheels, each equipped with an independent suspension system, run-flat inserts, and a Central Tyre Inflation System (CTIS). Braking is provided by eight disc brakes. Steering is provided on the first and second axles and at slow speed also with the fourth axle. The Centauro achieves road speeds above 100 km/h (62 mph); it can negotiate gradients up to 60%, ford water up to a depth of 1.5 m (4 ft 11 in) without preparation, and turn with a 9 m (29 ft 6 in) radius.

== Combat history ==
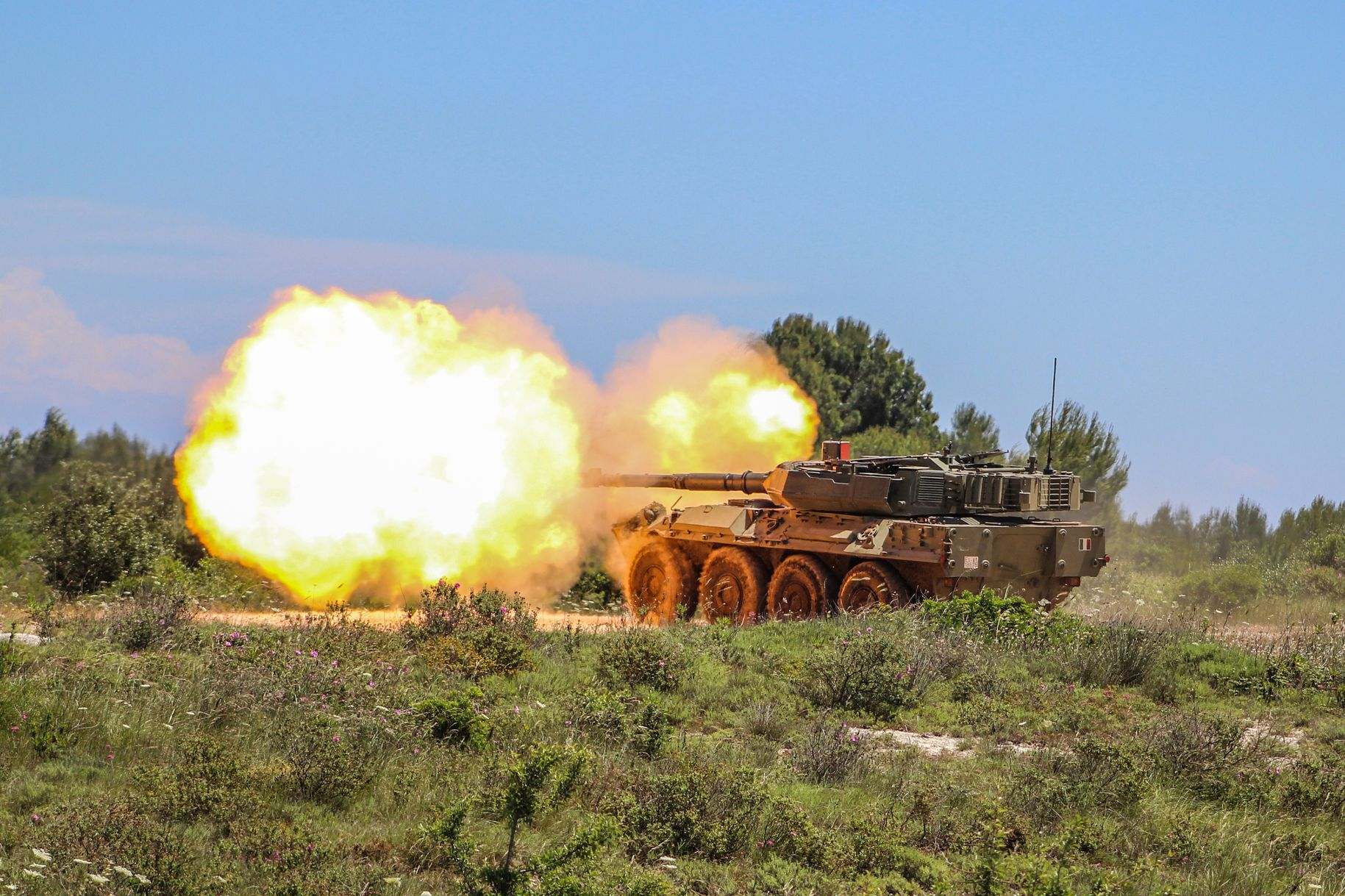
Regiment "Lancieri di Montebello" (8th) Centauro firing during an exercise

The Centauro is currently deployed as part of UNIFIL forces in Lebanon.

It was deployed in the former Yugoslavia and Somalia, where the design proved successful. Centauro was usually employed to escort motor convoys, for wide area control, and for road patrols. While on convoy duty at Somalia, a platoon of eight Centauros engaged hostile positions during the battle of checkpoint Pasta, on 2 July 1993.

Centauros were also deployed during operation Antica Babilonia, the Italian involvement in the Iraq War. During this operation, a Centauro troop took part in the battle for the bridges of Nasiriyah on 6 April 2004, destroying a building where snipers were hiding.

In 2003, Spain deployed six 105/52 mm Centauros to Iraq for their troops' self defence.

Several Centauros were donated to Ukraine by Italy in 2025 to fight in the Russo-Ukrainian War. These were often used to carry out long-range strikes with distances such as 11,100 meters being reported. The vehicle was praised for high accuracy and as well clear internal communications compared to Soviet tanks but due to drone saturated battlefields their use was largely limited to long distance fire support.

== Variants ==
=== Anti-tank ===
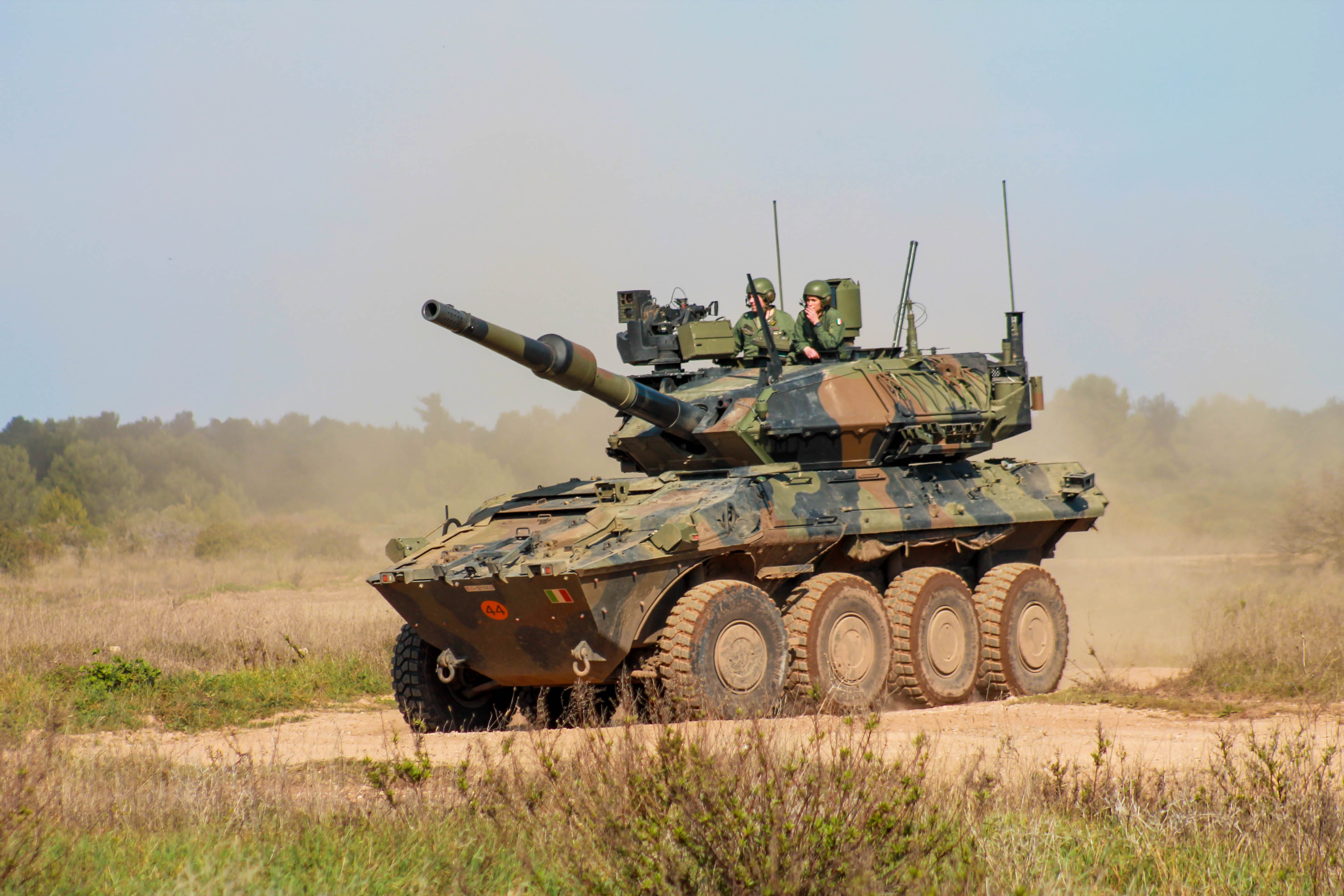
Regiment "Cavalleggeri di Lodi" (15th) Centauro 2 during an exercise in 2024

- Centauro 105mm

The baseline and original version, also called Centauro Reconnaissance Anti-Tank.

- Centauro 120mm

Upgraded Centauro with a low recoil 120 mm L/45 cannon (unrelated to the Rheinmetall L/44 120mm) in a newly designed turret and with new composite armour that can resist rounds up to 40 mm APFSDS on the front and 14.5 mm on the rest of the body. This vehicle was also used as a testbed for various technologies that would be used in the B1 Centauro's successor vehicle, the Centauro 2.

- Centauro 2

In July 2018, the Italian Army signed a €159 million (US$186 million) contract to acquire 10 Centauro 2 tank destroyers, the first tranche of a planned 150-vehicle order. The 30-ton Centauro 2 is based on the Freccia chassis with a three-man turret, an improved 120 mm L/45 (STANAG 4385 munition) or 105 mm L/52 (STANAG 4458) gun and an optional RWS in the form of the HITROLE Mod.L (Alternative: pintle mounted 7.62mm or 12.7mm MG). Additional improvements include a digital communication system, a 720 hp (533kW) engine delivering 24 hp/ton, and wheels extending farther out from the hull for greater stability and better protection against mine blasts. This is paired with a new Hydro-pneumatic suspension for greater situational adaptability.

Owing to the combination of its eight-wheeled configuration and revised chassis, the Centauro 2 can handle the high recoil of a high-velocity 120 mm cannon, while equivalent vehicles with fewer wheels or weaker chassis are often limited to main armament with lower velocity and/or lower calibre. The gun is fitted with an efficient muzzle brake.

=== Other roles ===
- VBM "Freccia"

The Veicolo Blindato Medio "Freccia" (lit. 'Medium Armoured Vehicle "Arrow"') is a Centauro reconfigured as a wheeled infantry fighting vehicle with multiple variants, such as command & control or mortar carrier, offering increased armour and NBC protection. It can transport up to eight infantrymen plus three crew.

- Centauro 155/39LW

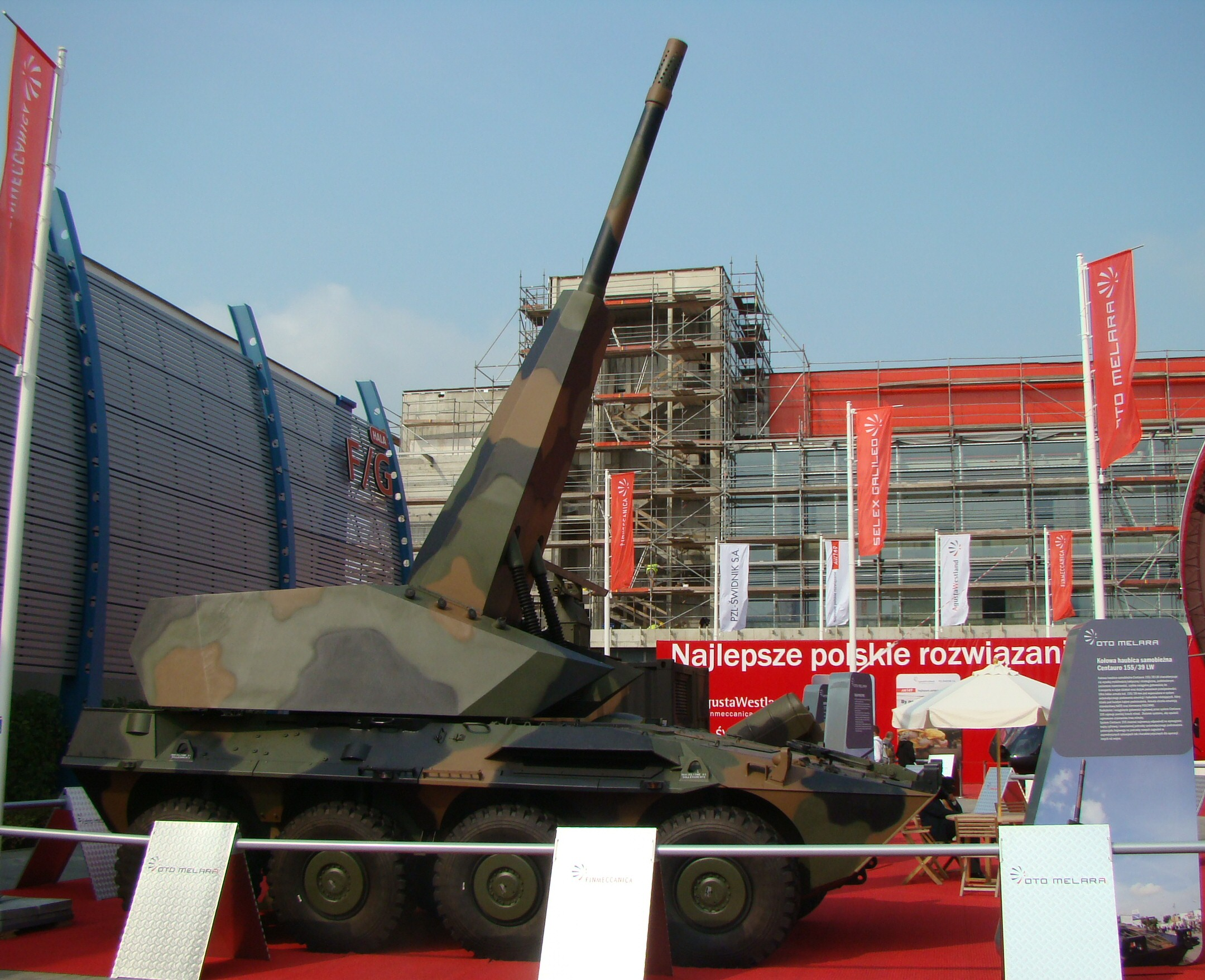
Centauro 155/39LW.

This addition to the Centauro range in late 2013 fills the role of self-propelled howitzer, and is able to fire
up to 8 rounds/minute to a distance exceeding 60 km for guided ammunition. It mounts an ultra light 155 mm/39 main gun,
based on the latest material breakthroughs,
and a secondary 7.62 or 12.7 mm MG. The 155/39 is manned by a crew of two and provides full NBC and ballistic protection.

- Centauro VBM Recovery

Serves both as an engineer vehicle and for recovery and repair of damaged armoured vehicles on the battlefield.

- Draco

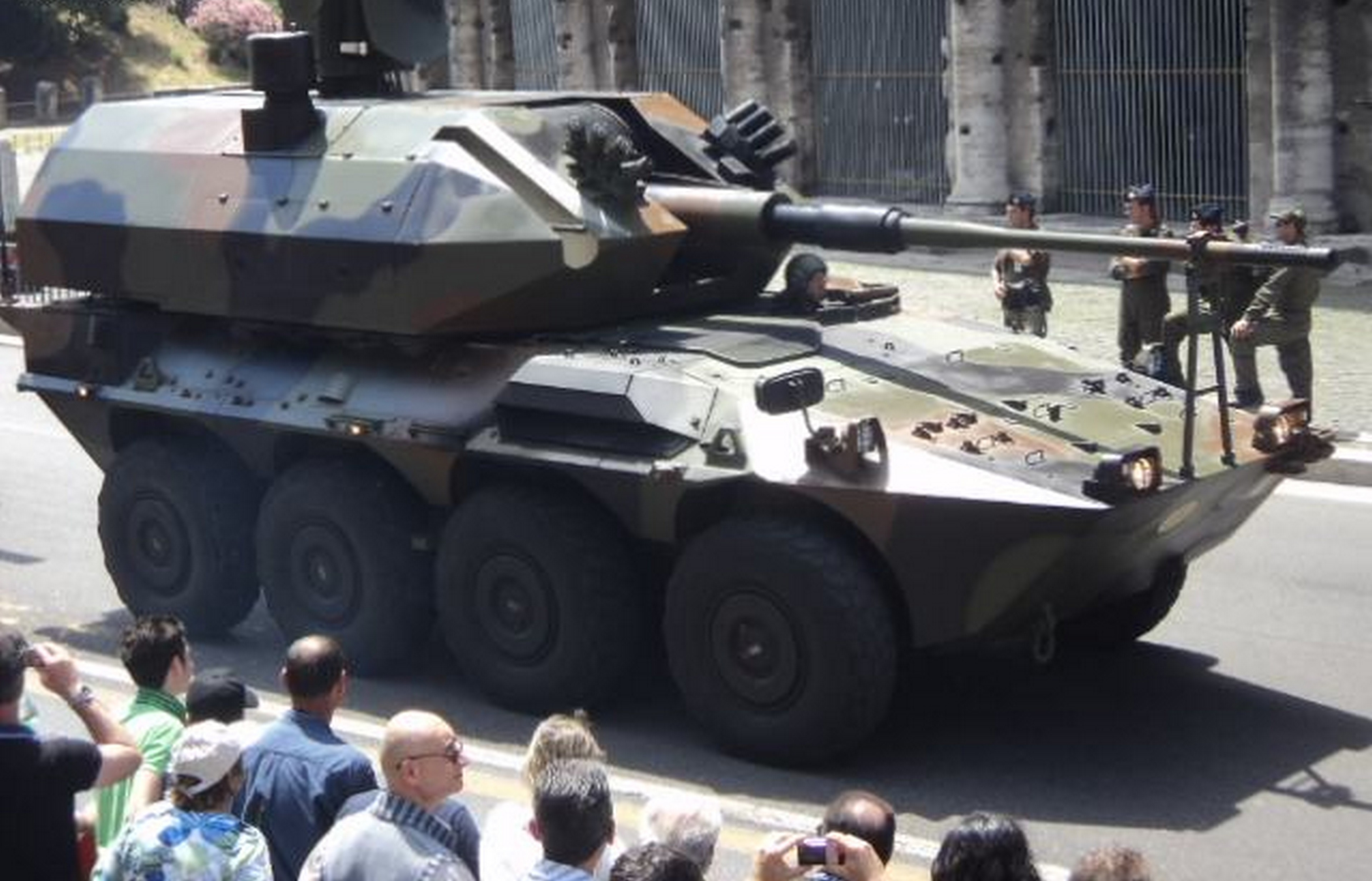
Centauro Draco.

The Draco was never completed, and remained as an unfinished prototype. The only functional part of the Draco was the hull itself which was that of a B1 Centauro; the actual weapon system reached the mock-up stage and was not completed. The Draco was to be armed with a revolver-type ammunition-loading system. It was to use all standard 76 mm ammunition, guided DART ammunition, C-RAM and top-attack ammunition, and was to be fully compatible with all in-service 76 mm rounds.
The rate of fire was to be 80–100 rounds per minute (depending on the elevation angle), the ammunition revolver
containing 12 indexed rounds and being able to shift from one type of ammunition to another.

== Operators ==
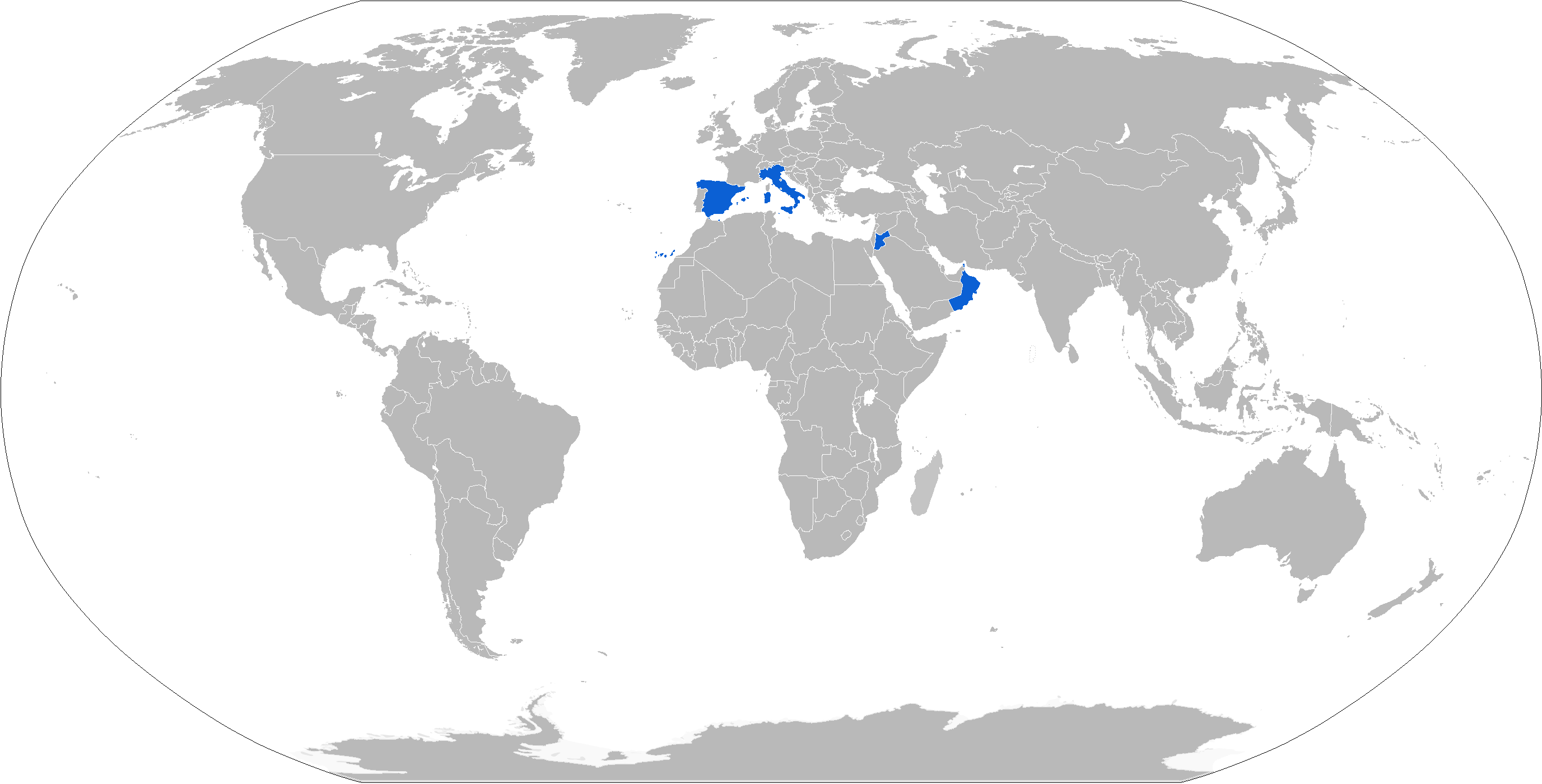
Map of B1 Centauro operators in blue

=== Current operators ===
==== Primary operators ====
Italy (259)
Centauro B1 (< 259):
Orders: Total production for the Italian Army was for 400 Centauro B1
- Batch 1: 100 (no spaced armour, 20 of which later received add-on armour ROMOR-A)
- Batch 2: 150 (15 mm additional armour on the hull / turret)
- Batch 3: 150 (add-on armour + lengthened by 22 cm, enabling to have two more ammunition racks or to remove it and to transport four infantry soldiers)
Retirement:
- 141 were later exported to Jordan.
Centauro 2 (150): 150 have been ordered in several stages, with the last order taking place in June 2024.
- 10 ordered in July 2018
- 86 ordered in December 2020 with 10 as an option
- 16 ordered in June 2022 with confirmation of the option of 10
- 28 ordered in June 2024
Brazil (7 on order; 2 delivered; requirement for 98; option of 221)
Centauro 2BR
- The Brazilian Army has a total requirement for 98 Centauro 2. In November 2022, the estimated value of the potential contract was USD 1 billion. A complementary order for 123 additional vehicles (221 in total) is planned to be signed few years prior to the completion of the initial contract. The follow-on contract was estimated at $1.1 billion. The production will be started in Italy, and eventually, it will be produced in Sete Lagoas by Iveco's Brazilian branch, together with the related 6×6 VBTP-MR Guarani.
- The 2 first vehicles were delivered to La Spezia in Italy during 2023. The vehicles were delivered for evaluation by the Brazilian Army under Phase I of the programme. Transit issues delayed their arrival in Brazil, with the first vehicle arriving in Brazil on 17 August 2024, and the second on 2 September 2024.
- On 31 August 2026, Brazil ordered 7 Centauro 2BR under Phase II of the programme, representing a significant delay from the originally planned signing date in December 2024. The first vehicle is expected to be delivered in 2028.
Oman (9)
Centauro B1
9 Centauro B1 ordered in 2003 for the Royal Guard of Oman. The variant selected is a modified variant with 120 mm gun.
Spain (88)
Centauro B1
Purchases:
- Centauro B1 (VRCC-105):
  - Phase 1: 22 ordered in 1999, delivered in 2000-01 (made in Italy)
  - Phase 2: 62 ordered in 2002, delivered in 2004-06 (made in Spain)
- Centauro VBM Recovery:
  - Phase 3: 4 ordered in 2010.

==== Second-hand operators ====
Italy donated some Centauro to support the defence of other nations.

Jordan (141)
141 Centauro B1 (all ex-Italian Army), modernised with upgrade kits.
Ukraine
First reports of the Centauro B1 transferred to Ukraine appeared in November 2025, likely donated as military aid. On 9 November 2025, the 78th Airborne Assault Regiment of the Ukrainian Air Assault Forces confirmed these rumors, by publishing an official video showcasing the Ukrainian paratroopers using a B1 Centauro in an unknown sector of the frontlines. While the total number of the Centauro gifted to Ukraine is yet unknown, footage published by the 78th regiment shows B1 armored cars with serial numbers going up to 015.

=== Evaluation-only operators ===
Russia
In 2012, the Russian Army tested the Freccia fitted with a 30 mm turret and the Centauro in 3 variants, equipped with the 105 mm canon on the Centauro B1, one fitted with a Russian 125 mm tank gun, and another one with a NATO 120 mm tank gun with the HITFACT 120mm turret. They were returned to Italy after tests were complete.
A discussion for up to 2,500 vehicles was mentioned. Following the annexation of Crimea in 2014, sanctions were imposed on Russia, and all cooperation on armament was cancelled.
United States
Leased 16 Centauro between 2000 and 2002 for evaluation, and to gain experience for the introduction of the M1128 mobile gun system. The vehicles were tested with the 2nd Infantry Division at Fort Lewis over a period of two years, and were subsequently returned to Italy in 2002.
