= K-156 (Kansas highway) =

State highway in Kansas, U.S.

K-156
- K-156 highlighted in red

Route information
- Maintained by KDOT and the cities of Garden City, Larned and Great Bend
- Length: 175.663 mi (282.702 km)
- Existed: April 1, 1981–present
- Tourist routes: Wetlands and Wildlife Scenic Byway

Major junctions
- West end: US 50 Bus. / US 83 Bus. in Garden City
- US-50 / US-83 / US-400 in Garden City; US-283 in Jetmore; US-183 near Rozel; US-56 from Larned to east of Great Bend
- East end: I-70 / US-40 near Ellsworth

Location
- Country: United States
- State: Kansas
- Counties: Finney, Hodgeman, Pawnee, Barton, Ellsworth

Highway system
- Kansas State Highway System; Interstate; US; State; Spurs
← K-155	→ K-157

K-156 is a 175.663-mile-long (282.702 km) west–east state highway in the U.S. state of Kansas. K-156's western terminus is at U.S. Route 50 Business (US-50 Bus.) and US-83 Bus. in Garden City and the eastern terminus is at Interstate 70 (I-70) and U.S. Route 40 (US-40) northeast of Ellsworth. Along the way, it intersects several major highways including US-50, US-83 and US-400 in Garden City; US-283 in Jetmore; and US-183 near Rozel, and it overlaps its implied parent, US-56, from Larned to east of Great Bend.

Before state highways were numbered in Kansas, there were auto trails; the section of K-156 from Larned to Great Bend followed the National Old Trails Road and Old Santa Fe Trail. By 1927, the section of K-156 from Garden City to Great Bend was established as US-50N. K-156 was originally US-156, an intrastate U.S. Highway that was formed in 1957, and ran from Garden City to Great Bend. Between 1966 and 1967, US-156 was extended northeast, along K-45, to I-70 northeast of Ellsworth. On April 1, 1981, US-156 was redesignated K-156.

== Route description ==
K-156 begins at US-50 Bus. and US-83 Bus. in Garden City and runs in a generally northeast direction to I-70 and US-40 northeast of Ellsworth. K-156 is signed as east–west its entire length. According to 2018 traffic counts conducted by the Kansas Department of Transportation, on average, traffic varied from 1,080 vehicles per day slightly east of the Finney–Hodgeman county line to 14,500 vehicles per day in Great Bend, slightly west of US-281. The second highest volume of traffic was 11,500 vehicles per day, at the western terminus. The section of K-156 from the western end of the overlap with US-56 to its eastern terminus is included in the National Highway System. K-156 also connects to the National Highway System at its junction with US-50, US-83 and US-400 in Garden City.

All but 5.973 miles (10 km) of K-156's 175.663-mile (283 km) alignment is maintained by KDOT. The first .465 miles (1 km) from the western terminus eastward is maintained by Garden City. The entire 1.409-mile (2 km) section of K-156 in Larned and the entire 4.099-mile (7 km) section of K-156 through Great Bend are maintained by the cities.

=== Finney and Hodgeman counties ===
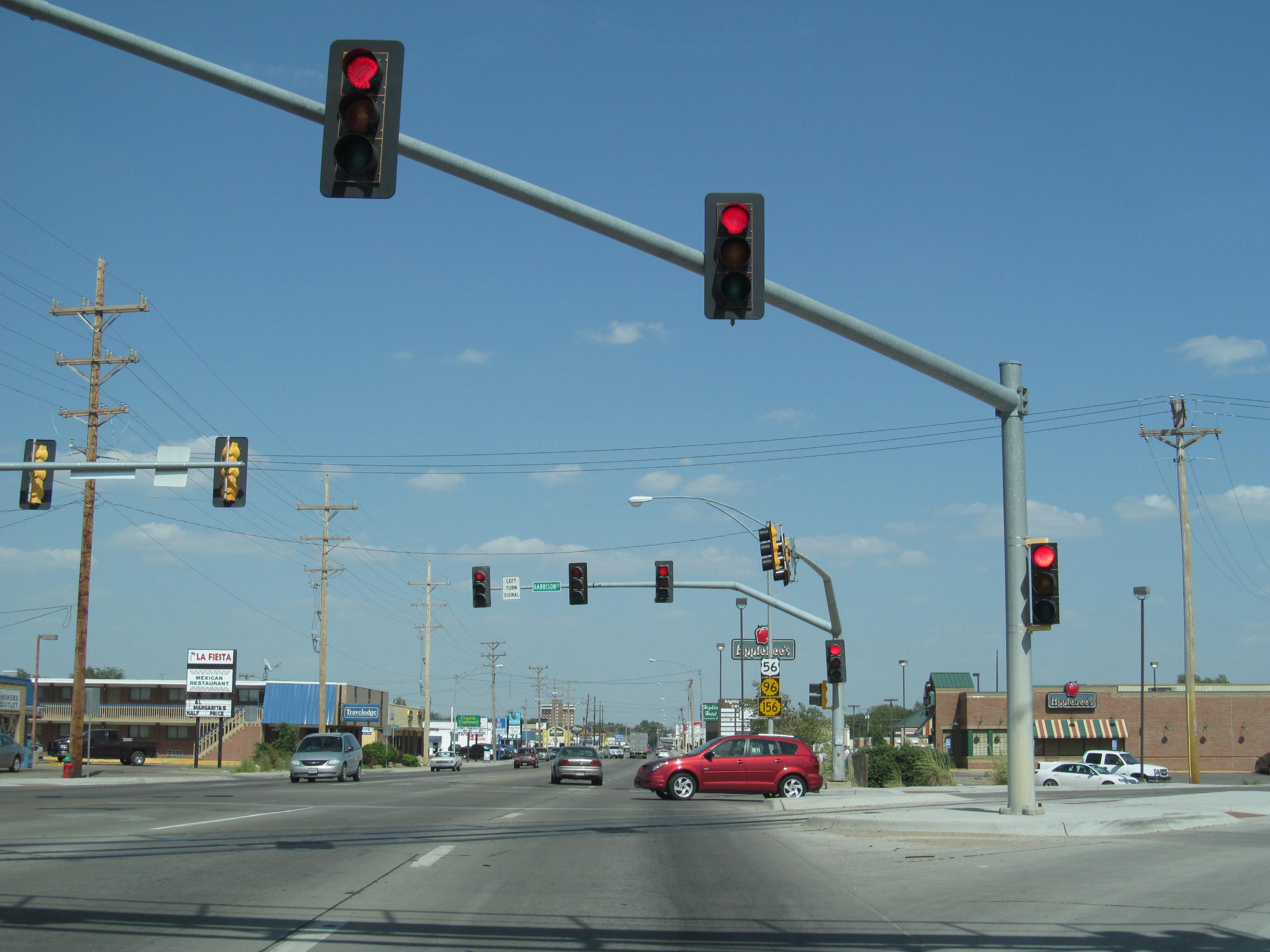
K-156 overlapped with US 56 and K-96

The route begins in Garden City, on Kansas Avenue at the junction with US-50 Business and US-83 Business (Main Street). The highway continues over Kansas Avenue then turns northeast at a junction with Campus Drive. K-156 then intersects US-50, US-83 and US-400 via a diamond interchange and then continues to follows Kansas Avenue in a northeast direction out of the city. It then curves east at East 6 Mile Road, then intersects Mennonite Road 1.7 miles (2.7 km) later. From here, the highway continues east for about eleven miles (18 km) through rural farmlands before intersecting K-23, passing by Concannon State Fishing Lake and crossing Pawnee River along the way. Here K-156 begins a six-mile-long (9.7 km) overlap with K-23. At the end of the overlap K-23 turns south toward Cimarron, as K-156 continues east. K-156 then passes through Kalvesta, then curves to the northeast as it crosses into Hodgeman County. About one mile (1.6 km) into the county, K-156 curves back to the east, then crosses Sand Creek 1.5 miles (2.4 km) later. Roughly 10.4 miles (16.7 km) further east the highway curves northeast for about one-mile (1.6 km) then curves back east. The highway continues another 3.5 miles (5.6 km) then enters Jetmore. In Jetmore it intersects US-283, also known as Main Street. As it exits the city it travels a short distance then curves to the northeast at Bosse. The roadway then curves more to the northeast and passes to the north of Hanston. As it passes by Hanston, K-156 curves east briefly then back northeast as it begins to parallel a Kansas and Oklahoma Railroad track. About three miles (4.8 km) later, the highway passes through Gray. It continues past Gray for another 3.5 miles (5.6 km) then enters into Pawnee County.

=== Pawnee County ===
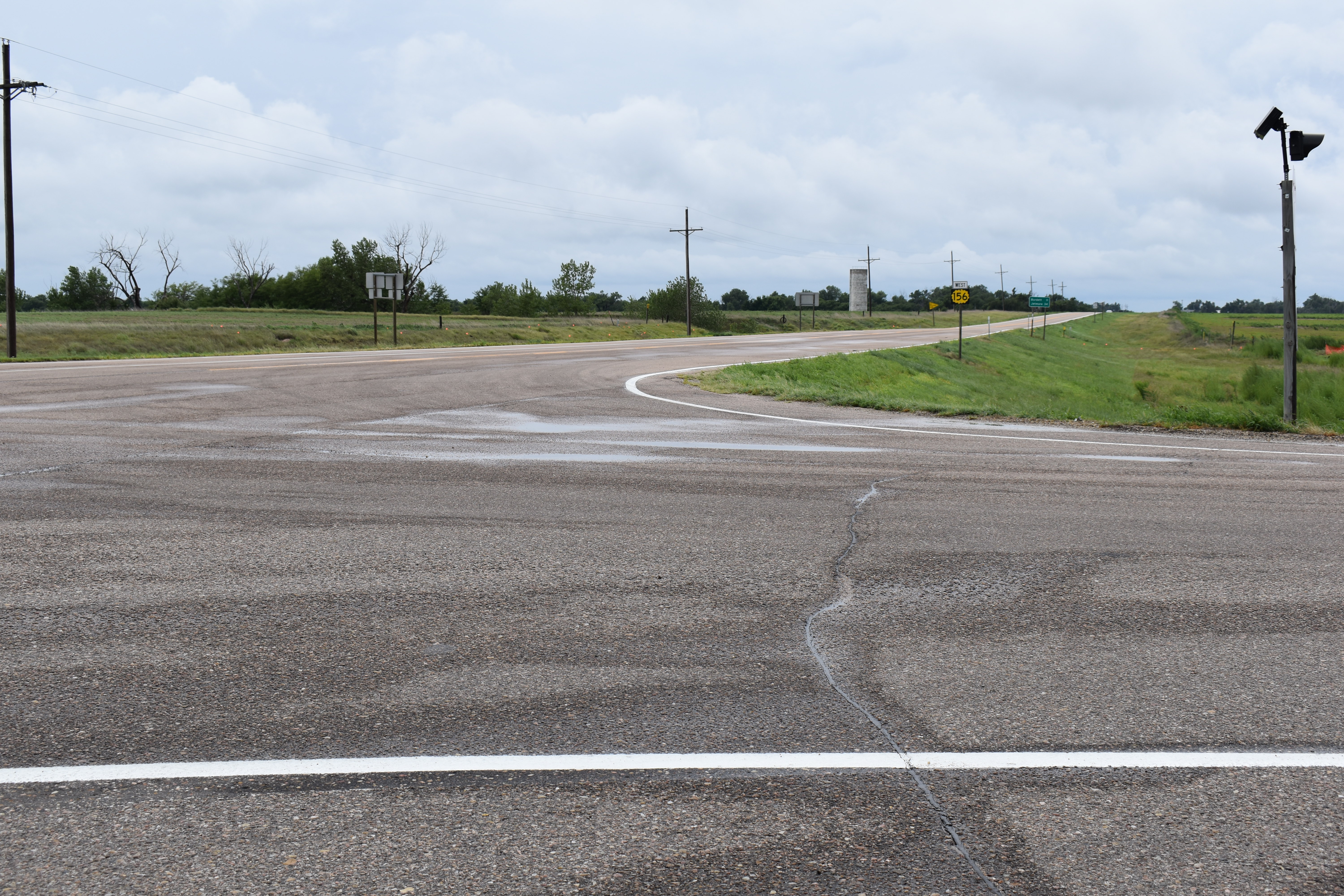
K-156 westbound at its junction with US-183

As it enters the county it continues to parallel a Kansas and Oklahoma Railroad track and the Pawnee River. After about 1.4 miles (2.3 km) K-156 curves east, passes to the north of Rucker Airport, then enters the southern section of Burdett as Broadway Avenue. It exits the city and continues east, crosses Sawmill Creek, then reaches an intersection with Pawnee Street and 280th Avenue just south of Rozel. About three miles (4.8 km) past Rozel it crosses a railroad track. From here the highway continues east through rural farmlands to US-183, crossing the Pawnee River and Cocklebur Creek along the way. It continues east for about nine miles (14 km) before intersecting K-264, passing Fort Larned National Historic Site along the way. K-264 heads south to Larned State Hospital, and K-156 continues east toward Larned. It enters Larned becoming Edwards Street then becomes 14th Street at an intersection with State Street. It continues along 14th Street and soon intersects its implied parent US-56, at Broadway Street. Here the two highways begin to overlap as they continue east. The two routes curve northeast as they exit the city and begin to parallel a Kansas and Oklahoma Railroad track. The highways then cross Ash Creek and enters Barton County 1.5 miles (2.4 km) later.

=== Barton and Ellsworth counties ===
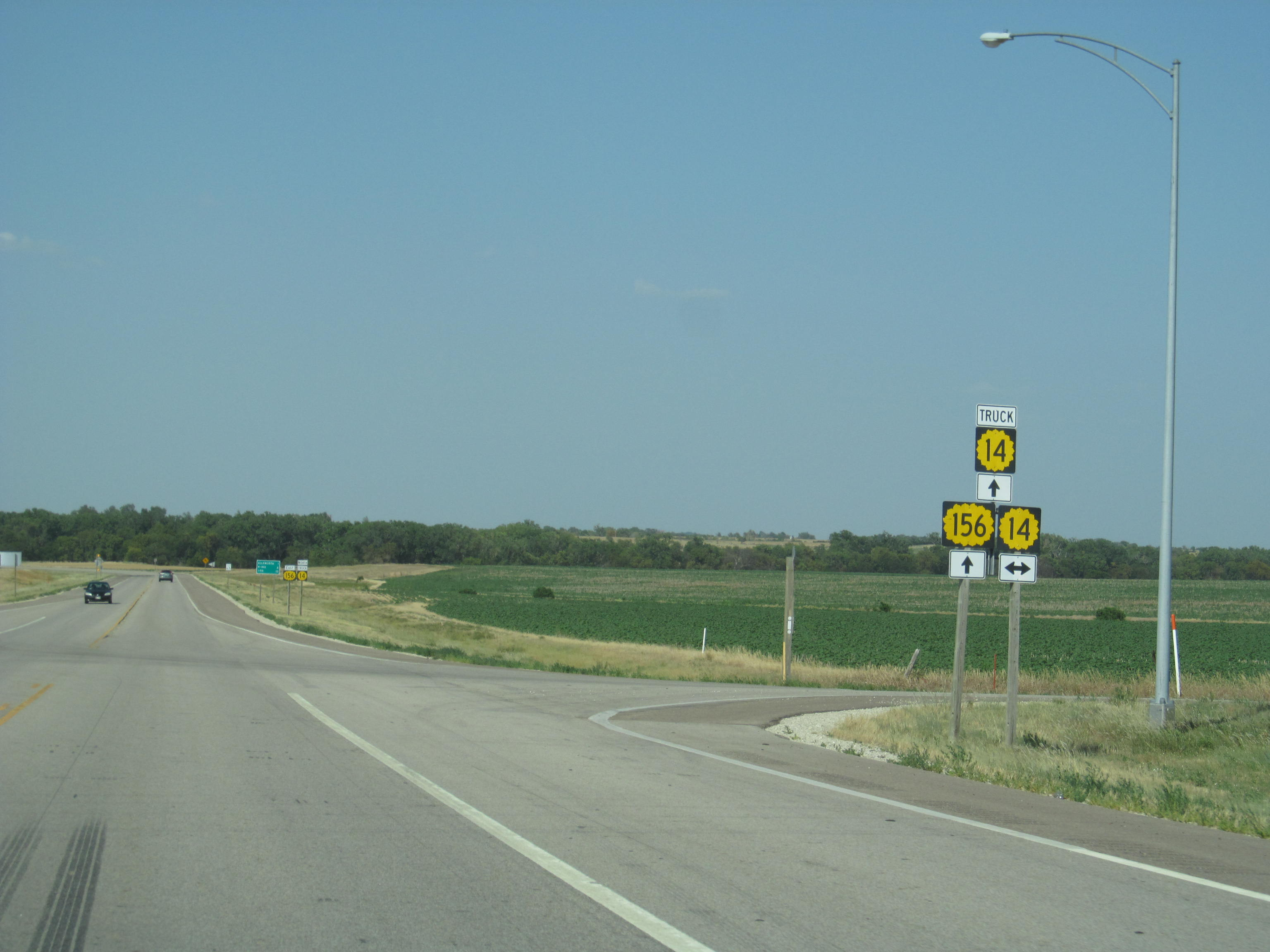
K-156 at junction with K-14 and K-14 Truck

As K-156 enters the county it enters the city of Pawnee Rock. It continues northeast and soon passes Dundee. As it exits Dundee it passes to the south of Great Bend Municipal Airport. K-156 and US-56 then curve north and enter Great Bend as South Patton Road. The highways turn east at 10th Street then soon intersects and begins to overlap with K-96. The three roads continue east along 10th Street for 1.8 miles (2.9 km) to an intersection with US-281 (Main Street), crossing a Kansas and Oklahoma Railroad track along the way. After the three highways cross US-281, they leave Great Bend and 2.2 miles (3.5 km) later, K-156 splits from US-56 and K-96, heading northeast from there. K-156 passes to the east of Cheyenne Bottoms Reservoir, crosses a Kansas and Oklahoma Railroad, then intersects K-4 at a folded diamond interchange east of Claflin. After an interchange with K-4, the highway enters Ellsworth County two miles (3.2 km) later. The highway enters the county and continues northeast before entering Holyrood. As it exits the city, it continues through rural farm lands transitioning into grasslands, and soon intersects K-14 south of Ellsworth. At that junction, K-156 begins carrying a concurrency with K-14 Truck route. The two routes then cross the Smoky Hill River and a Union Pacific Railroad track then enter Ellsworth. Inside the city the two highways curve north at an intersection with 8th Street. The highway passes Memorial Cemetery and soon intersects K-140, known as East 15th Street westbound and Avenue J eastbound. Here, K-14 Truck splits from K-156 and follows K-140 westbound, and K-156 continues north. The highway soon exits the city and continues north for about .8 miles (1.3 km) then curves northeast and crosses Oak Creek. K-156 then reaches a junction with K-111, crossing Spring Creek and East Spring Creek along the way. Past K-111, the landscape around the highway begins to transition to rolling hills covered by grasslands. K-156 then crosses and begins to parallel East Elkhorn Creek. It continues north along the creek for a few miles before reaching its northern terminus at exit 225 of I-70 and US-40 at a diamond interchange.

== History ==
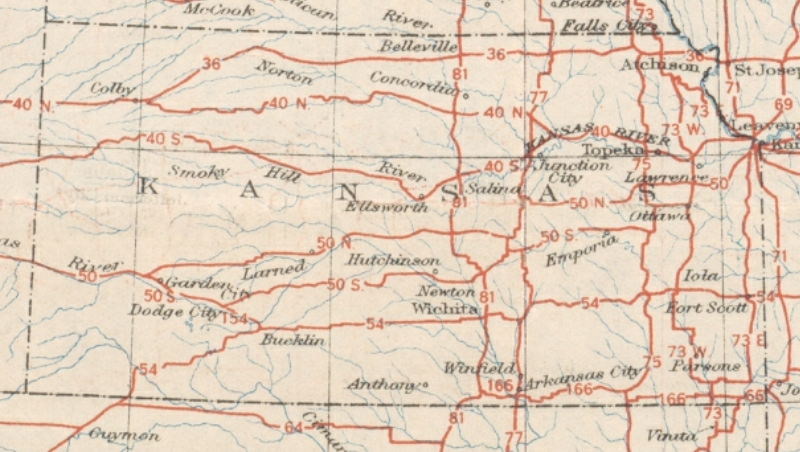
A map of Kansas's U.S. Highways as laid out in 1926

Before state highways were numbered in Kansas, there were auto trails, which were an informal network of marked routes that existed in the United States and Canada in the early part of the 20th century. From the western terminus, K-156 closely follows the former Old Santa Fe Trail, New Santa Fe Trail, National Old Trails Road and Albert Pike Highway. In Jetmore, K-156 intersects the former Star Highway. The highway then overlaps the National Old Trails Road and Old Santa Fe Trail from Larned to Great Bend. East of Claflin, the highway crosses the former Bee Line and Sunflower Trail, then crosses the former Golden Belt in Ellsworth.

U.S. Highway 156
- Existed: June 27, 1956–April 1, 1981

By 1927, the section of modern K-156 from Garden City to Great Bend was established as US-50N. Between 1944 and 1945, the section of current K-156 between Holyrood to south of Ellsworth was established as a section of K-45. In the early 1950s, towns along what was then the K-45 corridor, connecting Ellsworth, Kansas to the Oklahoma state line at Elkhart, formed the Mid-Continent Diagonal Highway Association to push for a new highway from Springer, New Mexico (on US-85) northeast across the Oklahoma Panhandle, along K-45, and continuing to Manitowoc, Wisconsin on Lake Michigan. By mid-1954, it was being promoted as US-55 between the Great Lakes and the Southwestern United States. The first submissions to the American Association of State Highway Officials (AASHO) to establish the route were made in 1954. The first route considered in northeast Kansas was via US-40 from Ellsworth to Topeka and K-4 and US-59 via Atchison to St. Joseph, Missouri. A revised route adopted in March 1955, due to AASHO objections to the original route, which traveled concurrently with other U.S. highways for over half of its length, followed K-14, K-18, US-24, K-63, K-16, and US-59 via Lincoln and Manhattan. In July, the US 50N Association proposed a plan that would have eliminated US-50N by routing US-55 along most of its length, from Larned east to Baldwin Junction, and then along US-59 to Lawrence and K-10 to Kansas City; towns on US-50N west of Larned, which would have been bypassed, led a successful fight against this. However, in September of that year, the Kansas Highway Commission accepted that plan, taking US-55 east to Kansas City. On June 27, 1956, the AASHO Route Numbering Committee considered this refined plan for US-55, between Springer, New Mexico and Kansas City, Missouri, with a short US-155 along the remaining portion of US-50N from Larned west to Garden City. The committee approved the request, but since the proposed route was more east–west than north–south, it changed it to an even number – US 56 – and the spur to US-156.

Between 1962 and 1963, K-45 was extended southwest from Claflin to US-56 east of Great Bend. In a AASHO meeting on July 4–5, 1966, it was approved to extend US-156 from Larned northwest through Great Bend and Ellsworth to I-70. By 1967, US-156 had been extended northeast from Larned along US-56 to Great Bend, then along K-45 to I-70 northeast of Ellsworth. At this time the K-45 designation was removed. In a resolution on October 13, 1967, US-40 between I-70 north of Dorrance to I-70 north of Salina was realigned onto I-70. At this time K-111 was extended north to end at US-156. Between 1975 and 1980, a folded diamond interchange was constructed at the junction with K-4. In a December 17, 1980 resolution, US-50 and US-83 were moved to their current alignment in Garden City, and US-50 Business and US-83 Business became US-156's western terminus.

The entirety of US-156, from Garden City to I-70 northeast of Ellsworth, was decommissioned on April 1, 1981, and redesignated as K-156. In a May 3, 1996 resolution, US-400 was established from the Colorado border to K-156, then to the southern end of the overlap between US-83 and US-50 in Garden City. On July 6, 2020, work began on a project to add turning lanes at the interchange with Eighth Street in Ellsworth County. The $1.2 million project was completed by Venture Corporation of Great Bend.

== Major intersections ==
County	Location	mi	km	Destinations	Notes
Finney	Garden City	0.000	0.000	US 50 Bus. / US 83 Bus. – Lakin, Scott City, Liberal	Western terminus
Finney	Garden City	1.936	3.116	US-50 / US-83 / US-400 – Scott City, Liberal	Diamond interchange
Finney		24.210	38.962	K-23 north – Dighton	Western end of K-23 overlap
Finney		30.190	48.586	K-23 south – Cimarron	Eastern end of K-23 overlap
Hodgeman	Jetmore	56.069	90.234	US-283 (Main Street) – Ness City, Jetmore	
Pawnee		89.939	144.743	US-183 – Lacrosse, Kinsley	
Pawnee		98.908	159.177	K-264 south – Larned State Hospital	Northern terminus of K-264
Pawnee	Larned	101.734	163.725	US-56 west (Broadway Street) – Belpre, Kinsley	Western end of US 56 overlap
Barton	Great Bend	122.153	196.586	K-96 west – Ness City	Western end of K-96 overlap
Barton	Great Bend	123.930	199.446	US-281 (Main Street) – Russell, St. John	
Barton		127.725	205.553	US-56 / K-96 east – Lyons	Eastern end of US 56/K-96 overlap
Barton		142.989	230.118	K-4 – Lindsborg, Hoisington	Folded diamond interchange
Ellsworth		162.671	261.794	K-14 (Grand Avenue) / K-14 Truck begins – Ellsworth, Lyons	Southern terminus of K-14 Truck; west end of K-14 Truck overlap
Ellsworth	Ellsworth	163.747	263.525	Kanopolis via Blake Street	Partial interchange; access via westbound exit ramp and connector road
Ellsworth	Ellsworth	164.966	265.487	K-14 Truck north (15th Street) / K-140 to I-135	East end of K-14 Truck overlap
Ellsworth		170.417	274.260	K-111 south – Kanopolis	Northern terminus of K-111
Ellsworth		175.663	282.702	I-70 / US-40 – Salina, Hays	Eastern terminus; I-70 exit 225; diamond interchange
1.000 mi = 1.609 km; 1.000 km = 0.621 mi: Concurrency terminus
