= Bruno Loi =

Italian general

- Born: 23 August 1941 (age 85)
- Military career
- Allegiance: Italy
- Branch: Esercito Italiano
- Service years: 1960–2004
- Rank: Lieutenant General
- Commands: UNOSOM II
- Conflicts: Battle of Checkpoint Pasta
- Awards: Knight Grand Cross, OMRI; Officer, OMI; Officer, Legion of Merit

Bruno Loi (born 23 August 1941) is a retired Italian Army lieutenant general, who served as commander of the Italian forces in UNOSOM II from May to September 1993.

== Career ==
=== Service in Somalia ===
Loi was infuriated as the result of an American operation in the Italian zone of control on 22 June 1993, since it took place without his permission. Loi was the commanding officer for the Italian forces in the Battle of Checkpoint Pasta. He later re-occupied Checkpoint Pasta after the battle, to do this he used diplomacy to persuade Somali general Mohamed Farrah Aidid to withdraw, annoying the United States, who viewed diplomacy as a waste of effort and advocated a forceful solution. The United Nations asked Italy to remove Loi from his position in July on charges of insubordination, a request which Italy denied. These incidents contributed to a considerable straining of relations between Italy and the rest of the United Nations peacekeeping force. Loi served out the rest of his term as commander, returning to Italy in September.
