= Kia Retona =

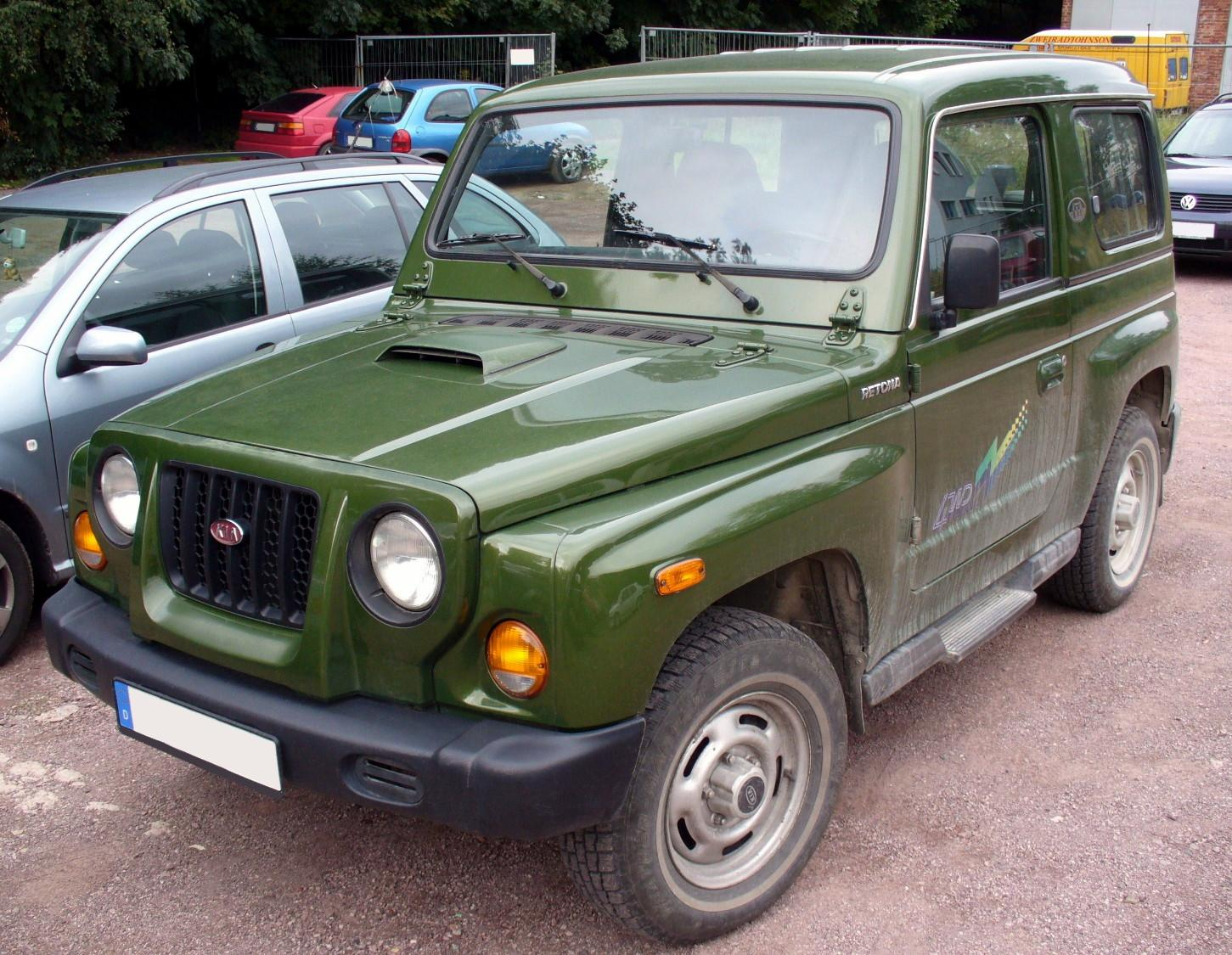

Overview
- Manufacturer: Kia Motors
- Also called: Kia Retona Cruiser (KDM Facelift)
- Production: 1998–2003
- Assembly: South Korea: Gwangju (Gwangju Plant)

Body and chassis
- Class: Mini SUV (J)
- Body style: 3-door SUV
- Layout: Front-engine, four-wheel-drive
- Chassis: Body-on-frame
- Related: Kia KM131

Powertrain
- Engine: 2.0 L FE-DOHC I4; 2.0 L RT turbodiesel I4

Dimensions
- Length: 1998–2000: 4,000 mm (157.5 in); 2000–2003: 4,025 mm (158.5 in)
- Width: 1,745 mm (68.7 in)
- Height: 1,835 mm (72.2 in)
- Curb weight: 1,510 kg (3,329 lb)

Chronology
- Predecessor: Asia Rocsta
- Successor: Kia Sportage

The Kia Retona is a small mini SUV based on Kia's military jeeps. The name is a portmanteau of return to nature. Developed by Asia Motors, the car was initially sold as the "Asia Retona" in some markets. The Retona had been using the same platform as the first generation Kia Sportage Convertible. Its competitors included the Lada Niva, Suzuki Jimny and the SsangYong Korando.

A 2006 survey of German owners by magazine Auto Bild found that the Retona was "abysmally" unreliable.
