= K100 Jeep =

- Type: 1/4-ton truck
- Place of origin: South Korea

Service history
- In service: 1975–unknown

Production history
- Designer: American Motors Corporation; Shinjin Jeep Motor Company
- Designed: 1974
- Manufacturer: Shinjin Jeep Motor Company
- Produced: 1974–1978

The K100 Jeep is a 4x4 1/4-ton multi-purpose truck developed by American Motors Corporation and Shinjin Jeep Motor Company (now KG Mobility) for the Republic of Korea Armed Forces in 1974. The K100 joined the armed forces in 1975 and was produced as a gap-filler until the start of mass production of the K111 Jeep in 1978.

== History ==
In March 1969, Shinjin Motor Company and Kaiser Jeep signed a technical partnership to locally assemble complete knock-down kits for 3,000 Jeep CJ-5s every year. To receive a cash loan from the government, Shinjin Motor claimed the Jeeps would be supplied to the Republic of Korea Reserve Forces; however, the company also had the intention of selling them to the public market. Later, the government was criticized for granting an unfair financial advantage to Shinjin Motor.

On 15 July 1969, Shinjin Motor began constructing a new factory in Busan. In the meantime, 450 CJ-5s were built in the factory located in Bupyeong from November 1969 to March 1970. The completion ceremony for the new factory was held on 15 April 1970.

On 3 April 1970, Shinjin Motor donated three CJ-5s to the Blue House, which were then transferred to the ROK Reserve Forces by President Park Chung Hee on 30 April, making them the first vehicles operated by the military. The Korean National Police also became the operator of CJ-5s on 10 December 1970.

On 29 September 1972, Shinjin Motor announced its plan to create a 50-50 joint venture with the American Motors Corporation, which had acquired Kaiser Jeep in 1970, to increase its capability of manufacturing the vehicles. On 14 July 1973, two companies signed an agreement for the creation of Shinjin Jeep to produce 500 Jeeps every month for both the Korean military and the domestic market. Shinjin Motor had manufactured a total of 3,800 CJ-5s under the previous agreement with Kaiser Jeep.

On 6 April 1974, Shinjin Jeep Motor Company, Ltd. was established. Since then, American Motors has stopped supplying the four-cylinder engine, instead switching to the six-cylinder engine, and has tried to sell the militarized Jeep, which was first revealed on 2 October, to the South Korean military. However, the V6 engine became a burden rather than beneficial for the military as it consumed more fuel, and none of the V4 models experienced underpower problems while operating on hilly terrain during the Korean War. Moreover, local production of parts was not allowed due to the agreement with American Motors, and American Motors had full control over design modifications, including the selection of engine type.

The "militarized" V6 CJ-5 was not truly a militarized vehicle, as it shares many parts with the civilian variant and was disqualified by the Korean military for being substandard after field operations. The biggest problem with the vehicle was its incompatibility with other Jeep-type vehicles operated by the military, which complicates logistics. However, despite the issues, the K100 was put into service in 1975 as the Korean military needed immediate replacements for older Jeep variants. In the same year, the South Korean Ministry of National Defense reported that the military must shift from U.S. aid to self-procurement due to the change in the United States' policy. When President Park received the report, he decided to take advantage of the current situation to pursue the domestic development of such vehicles.

Since then, Shinjin Jeep and Kia Industries have competed to create a new domestic multi-purpose vehicle to replace all compact-sized cars operated by the military. On 25 August 1976, Kia Industries acquired Asia Motors, a dedicated military vehicle repair company, with the long-term goal of delivering military vehicles to the Korean military. Eventually, Asia Motors was selected as the provider in April 1978, and mass production of the K111 began in July.

== Aftermath ==
After losing competition and poor sales in South Korea, American Motors Corporation withdrew and terminated its partnership with Shinjin Motor Company in March 1979. Two companies also had a disagreement regarding the export of Shinjin-made Jeeps because they could disrupt the existing market.

After the end of the partnership, Shinjin Motor began exporting the vehicles as well as changing the V6 gasoline engine, which contributed to the poor sales, to the Isuzu 4BA1 diesel engine without any intervention from American Motors. The company was renamed Geohwa Co., Ltd. on 26 March 1981.

== Users ==
- South Korea

== See also ==
- K111 Jeep
