= K-111 (Kansas highway) =

State highway in Kansas, U.S.

K-111
- K-111 highlighted in red

Route information
- Maintained by KDOT
- Length: 5.334 mi (8.584 km)
- Existed: September 28, 1948–present

Major junctions
- South end: F Street at Kanopolis city limits
- K-140 north of Kanopolis
- North end: K-156 northeast of Ellsworth

Location
- Country: United States
- State: Kansas
- Counties: Ellsworth

Highway system
- Kansas State Highway System; Interstate; US; State; Spurs
← K-110	→ K-112

K-111 is an approximately 5.33-mile-long (8.58 km) state highway in the U.S. state of Kansas. Its southern terminus is at F Street at the Kanopolis city limits, and the northern terminus is at K-156 northeast of the city of Ellsworth. Along the way it intersects K-140 north of Kanopolis. K-111 travels through mostly flat rural farmlands south of K-140, and small rolling hills covered with grasslands north of K-140. It is a two-lane highway its entire length.

Before state highways were numbered in Kansas, there were auto trails. The highway crosses the former Golden Belt at its junction with K-140. When K-111 was first designated a state highway on September 28, 1948, as a short spur between Kanopolis and U.S. Route 40 (US-40), which is modern K-140. On October 13, 1967, US-40 was rerouted to overlap the newly constructed section of I-70 from Dorrance to Salina. At that time K-111 was extended northward to US-156, which is modern K-156. Then on November 27, 1968, old US-40 from Ellsworth eastward to Salina was designated K-140. In an American Association of State Highway and Transportation Officials (AASHTO) meeting on October 13, 1979, it was approved to remove US-156 as a U.S. highway. Then on April 4, 1981, US-156 was redesignated as K-156.

== Route description ==
K-111 begins at the Kanopolis city limits as a continuation of F Street. As the highway leaves the city it curves north and begins travelling through flat rural farmlands. It continues northward and soon crosses over an unnamed creek that is bordered by trees. The highway passes through more farmland for a little over 0.5 miles (0.80 km) before reaching an intersection with K-140, which heads west to Ellsworth and east to Salina. As K-111 advances north, the landscape transitions to rolling hills mixed with grasslands and some farmlands. After roughly 1.3 miles (2.1 km) the roadway begins to parallel to the east of East Spring Creek, a tributary of Spring Creek, which flows into Smoky Hill River. Roughly 0.7 miles (1.1 km) later the river then passes under the highway and continues to parallel it. K-111 continues north for roughly 1.4 miles (2.3 km) through rolling hills covered with grasslands then crosses East Spring Creek again. The highway continues another roughly 0.3 miles (0.48 km) before reaching its northern terminus at K-156, which heads west to Ellsworth and east to I-70 and US-40.

The Kansas Department of Transportation (KDOT) tracks the traffic levels on its highways, and in 2019, they determined that on average the traffic varied from 220 vehicles per day slightly north of the junction with K-140 to 495 vehicles per day slightly south of the junction with K-140. K-111 is not included in the National Highway System, (Note: The National Highway System is a system of highways important to the nation's defense, economy, and mobility.) but does connect to it at its northern terminus at K-156. The entire route is paved with partial design bituminous pavement.

== History ==
=== Early roads ===
Before state highways were numbered in Kansas there were auto trails, which were an informal network of marked routes that existed in the United States and Canada in the early part of the 20th century. K-111 intersects K-140, which follows the former Golden Belt, an auto trail that went from Denver east to Kansas City.

=== Establishment and realignments ===
K-111 was first designated a state highway by KDOT, at the time State Highway Commission of Kansas (SHC), on September 28, 1948. At that time it ran from US-40 (modern K-140) southward and ended at the Kannapolis city limits. In July 1963, the city of Kanopolis made a request to the SHC to extend K-111 north from US-40 to K-45, to provide a direct link to I-70. In an American Association of State Highway and Transportation Officials (AASHTO) meeting on July 4–5, 1966, it was approved to extend US-156 from Larned northwest through Great Bend and Ellsworth to I-70. By 1967, US-156 had been extended northeast from Larned along US-56 to Great Bend, then along K-45 to I-70 northeast of Ellsworth, at which time the K-45 designation was removed.

On October 13, 1967, US-40 was rerouted to overlap the newly constructed section of I-70 from Dorrance to Salina. At that time K-111 was extended northward 3.8 miles (6.1 km) to US-156, now K-156. Later in October, the SHC announced that old US-40 from K-141 east to Salina will remain a state highway and the section from Ellsworth east to K-141 would be maintained by the county. Ellsworth County objected to this because the average daily traffic was the same on both sections. Then on November 27, 1968, old US-40 from Ellsworth eastward to Salina was designated K-140. In an AASHTO meeting on October 13, 1979, it was approved to remove US-156 as a U.S. highway. Then in a resolution on April 4, 1981, US-156 was redesignated as K-156 by KDOT.

== Major intersections ==
The entire route is in Ellsworth County.

Location	mi	km	Destinations	Notes
Ellsworth Township	0.000	0.000	F Street	Continuation west into Kanopolis at city limits
Ellsworth–Clear Creek township line	1.583	2.548	K-140 to I-135 – Kanopolis Lake, Ellsworth	Former US-40; to I-135 via K-140 east
Garfield–Sherman township line	5.334	8.584	K-156 to I-70 – Ellsworth	Northern terminus; former US-156; to I-70 via K-156 east; road continues unpaved as 19th Road
1.000 mi = 1.609 km; 1.000 km = 0.621 mi
