= Asia Rocsta =

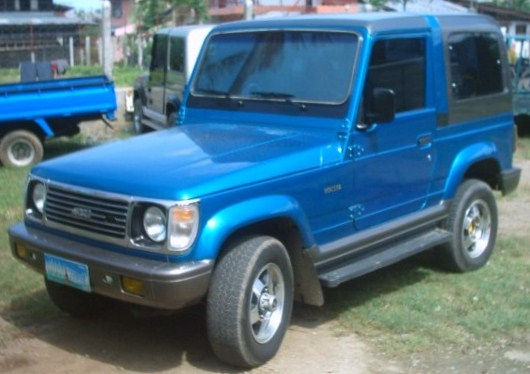

Overview
- Manufacturer: Asia Motors
- Production: 1990-1997

Body and chassis
- Body style: 3-door Mini SUV
- Layout: Front-engine, four-wheel-drive
- Chassis: Body-on-frame

Powertrain
- Engine: 1.8 L Mazda F8 I4 (petrol); 2.2 L Mazda R2 I4 (diesel)

Dimensions
- Length: 3,460 mm (136.2 in)
- Width: 1,680 mm (66.1 in)
- Height: 1,855 mm (73.0 in)
- Curb weight: 1,510 kg (3,329 lb)

Chronology
- Successor: Asia/Kia Retona

The Asia Rocsta is a four-wheel drive off-road vehicle built by Asia Motors Corporation in South Korea. It was available as a SUV or pickup truck.

The Rocsta is derived from the K111 Jeep, also developed by Asia Motors. Because this model was cheaper than competing 4WD vehicles, it contributed to the increase in popularity of offroad racing in Korea.

Asia Motors launched the Rocsta in 1990, and retired it in 1997. From 1998, the Rocsta's replacement, the Asia Retona, was sold with Kia badging.

UK sales of the Rocsta ran from 1994–1997 and included both the 1.8-litre petrol and 2.2-litre diesel engines. Both could be purchased with either a hard- or a soft-top. Both models were distributed by Kia Motors and used Kia copies of standard Mazda engines, with five-speed manual transmission.

The Rocsta was also sold in Australia between 1993 and 2000.

== Variants ==
- Rocsta 1.8 DX Hard Top - Model# AM102 GS. Engine Number begins JF8 being for the Mazda F8 engine
- Rocsta 1.8 DX Soft Top
- Rocsta 2.2
- Rocsta 2.2 4WD
- Rocsta 2.2 D Soft Top
- Rocsta 2.2 Diesel DX H/Top
- Rocsta 2.2 Diesel DX S/Top
- Rocsta 2.2 Diesel Soft Top
- Rocsta R2 Wagon

=== Gallery ===
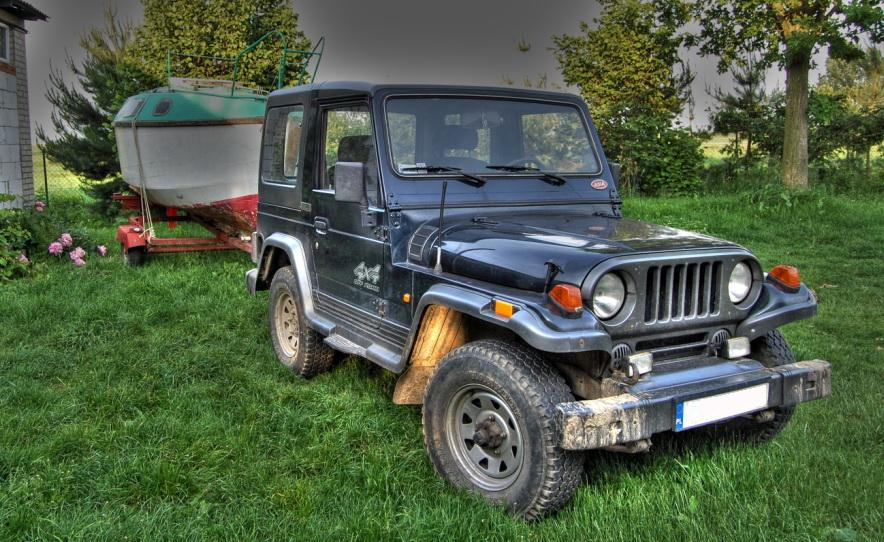
Standard Rocsta.

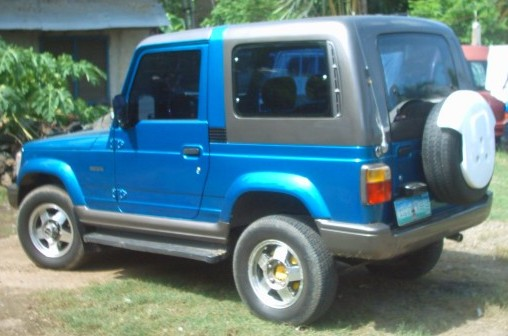
Rocsta R2 rear.

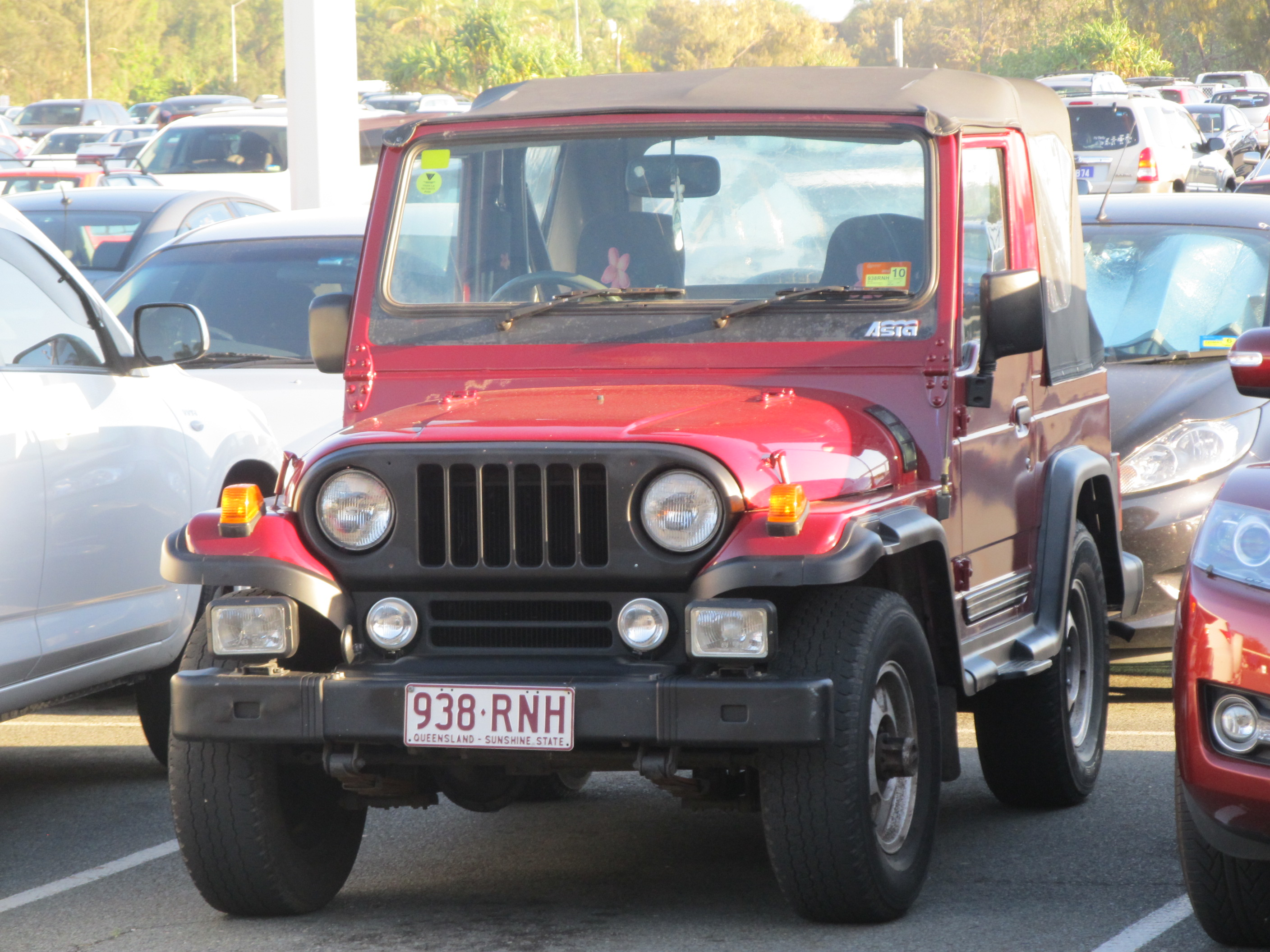
1994 Asia Rocsta (Australia).
