= CAC K100 =

Mini-UAV aircraft developed in the 1990s

K100

General information
- Type: Reconnaissance UAV
- National origin: France
- Manufacturer: CAC Systèmes, EADS

The CAC K100 is a mini-UAV developed in France in the 1990s. The company sells a reconnaissance variant, the K100/R, and an antiradar loitering attack variant, the K100/A. The K100 is of conventional aircraft configuration, except for an upright vee tail and a pusher propeller. It has no landing gear.

== Specifications ==
General characteristics

- Crew: None
- Capacity: 5 kg (11 lb) payload
- Length: 1.5 m (4 ft 11 in)
- Wingspan: 2.60 m (8 ft 6 in)
- Empty weight: 23 kg (47 lb)
- Gross weight: 28 kg (62 lb)
- Powerplant: 1 × piston engine , 5.0 kW (7.0 hp)

Performance

- Maximum speed: 234 km/h (145 mph, 126 kn)
- Endurance: 30 minutes
