= Ellsworth Township, Kansas =

Ellsworth Township
- Township
- Location in Ellsworth County
- Coordinates: 38°44′24″N 098°12′23″W
- Country: United States
- State: Kansas
- County: Ellsworth

Area
  - Total: 34.22 sq mi (88.63 km^{2})
  - Land: 34.14 sq mi (88.43 km^{2})
  - Water: 0.077 sq mi (0.2 km^{2}) 0.23%
- Elevation: 1,578 ft (481 m)

Population (2020)
  - Total: 648
  - Density: 19.0/sq mi (7.33/km^{2})
- GNIS feature ID: 0475353

Ellsworth Township is a township in Ellsworth County, Kansas, United States. As of the 2020 census, its population was 648.

== Geography ==
Ellsworth Township covers an area of 34.22 square miles (88.6 km^{2}) and contains two incorporated settlements: Ellsworth (the county seat) and Kanopolis. According to the USGS, it contains one cemetery, Memorial.

The streams of East Oak Creek, East Spring Creek, Oak Creek, Oxide Creek, Spring Creek and West Oak Creek run through this township.

== Transportation ==
Ellsworth Township contains one airport or landing strip, Ellsworth Municipal Airport.
