= Asia Motors =

Defunct South Korean automotive manufacturer

Asia Motors Industries Co., Ltd.
- Native name: 아시아자동차공업 주식회사
- Type: Subsidiary
- Industry: Automotive
- Founded: 1965
- Defunct: 1999
- Fate: Merged into Kia
- Successor: Kia's Gwangju plant
- Headquarters: Gwangju, South Korea
- Parent: Kia
- Website: asia.co.kr

- Asia Motors
- Hangul: 아시아자동차
- Hanja: 亞細亞自動車
- RR: Asia jadongcha
- MR: Asia chadongch'a

Asia Motors Industries, traded as Asia Motors (Korean: 아시아자동차; IPA: [aɕʰia dʑadoŋtɕʰa]), was a South Korean car manufacturer established in 1965 and closed in 1999. From 1976 onwards, it was a subsidiary of Kia Motors.

== History ==
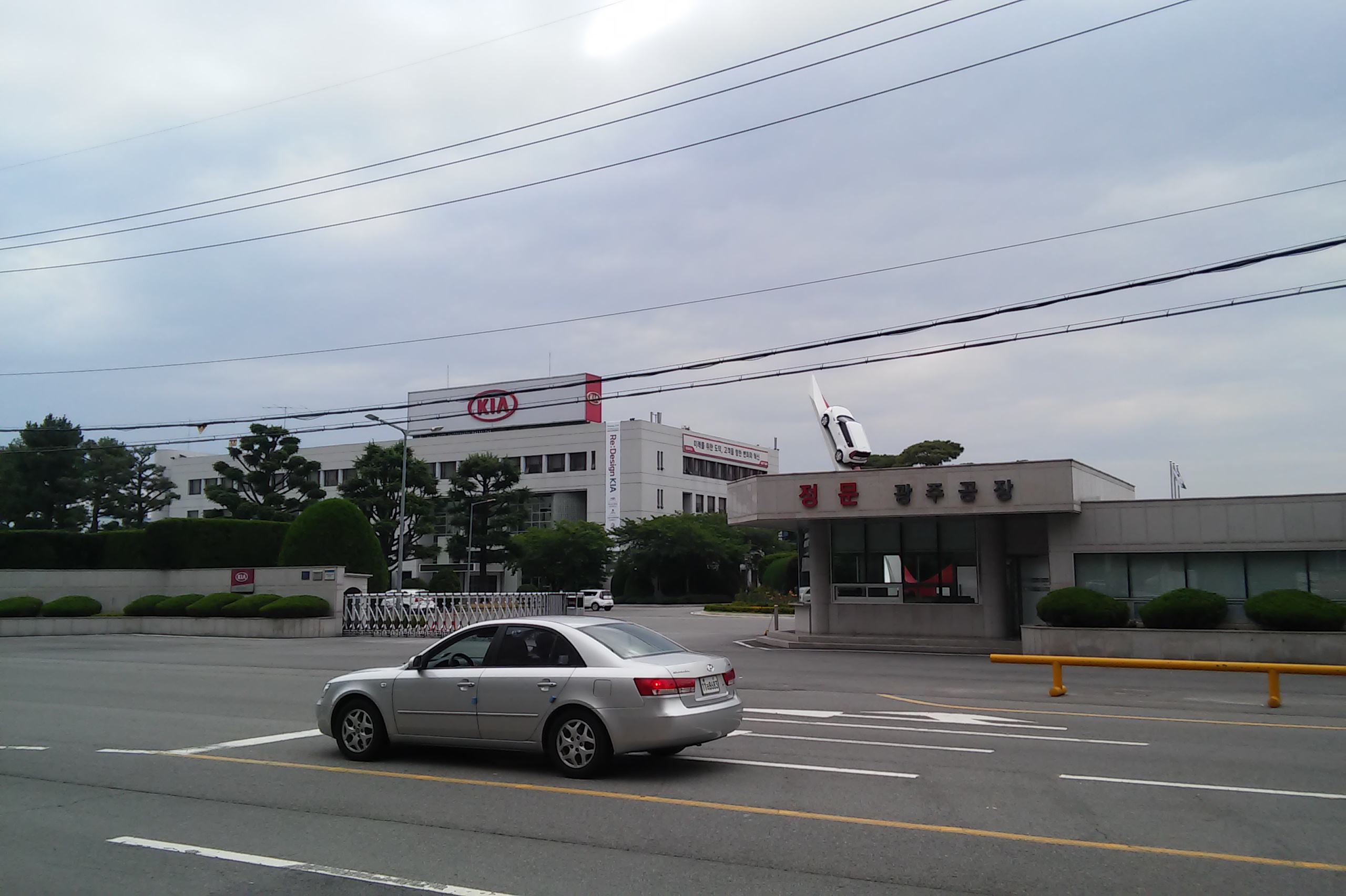
Kia's Gwangju plant, pictured in 2016, the former site of Asia Motors

In 1962, as one of the measures to comply its First Five-Year Economic Development Plan, the Korean government passed a law exempting from taxes imported parts to assemble KD cars locally. In 1965, as a result of these incentives, Asia Motor Industries was established in Gwangju through the financial support of entrepreneur Lee Mun-hwan. The company was initially manufacturing military vehicles, trucks and buses but soon it began negotiations with Fiat and in 1970 it started to assemble Fiat 124 models. It diversified into the SUV and heavy vehicles market, including large and medium duty trucks, special military vehicles, lightweight cars, civilian jeeps (a small jeep look-alike called the Rocsta and later the Retona), motor vehicle components, to include engines, and buses and mini-buses. In 1969, Asia Motors was acquired by Dongkuk Steel. In 1973, the South Korean government launched a plan to promote the production of low-cost cars for export. Asia Motors was unable to satisfy the plan's conditions, losing its car assembly permits, and was purchased by Kia in 1976, as the government promised Kia, in exchange of doing so, a monopoly of the military vehicle production for South Korea. In 1978, Asia Motors signed an agreement with Hino Motors of Japan with the aim of achieving economies of scale for its low-volume products. Hyundai in turn purchased Kia and the Asia brand was discontinued in 1999. The Rocsta's replacement, the Retona, was sold under the Kia brand.

=== Failed Brazilian production ===
In 1994, Asia Motors do Brasil, an independent importer of Asia vehicles, was established in Brazil. Asia Motors do Brasil achieved some sales success and, in 1996, it signed an agreement with the Brazilian government for building an assembly plant at Camaçari in exchange of tax exemptions for imported vehicles. The plant was never completed, and the unpaid taxes prevented Kia's parent company Hyundai from building a factory in the country until 2012, when the Brazilian justice determined Hyundai was not bound to pay them, as it was not related to the importer. The first Hyundai owned factory in Brazil was opened in 2012 in Piracicaba, having produced only the HB20 (including the HB20S notchback and the off-road themed HB20X derivatives) and the Creta, while Kia vehicles for sale in Brazil are all imported from South Korea and Uruguay.

== Vehicles ==
=== Passenger vehicles ===
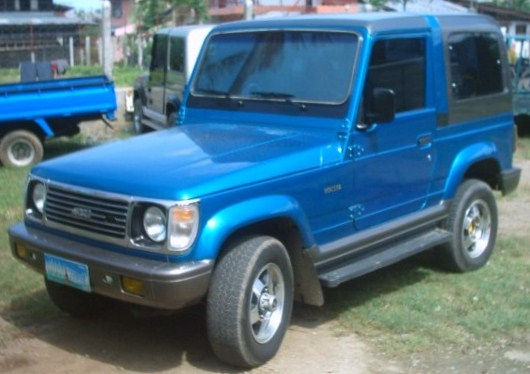
Asia Rocsta in the Philippines

- Fiat 124
- Rocsta
- Retona

=== Vans ===
- Asia Topic (Mazda Bongo/Kia Bongo I)
- Asia Towner (Daihatsu Hijet/Kia Towner)

=== Small / medium-sized buses ===
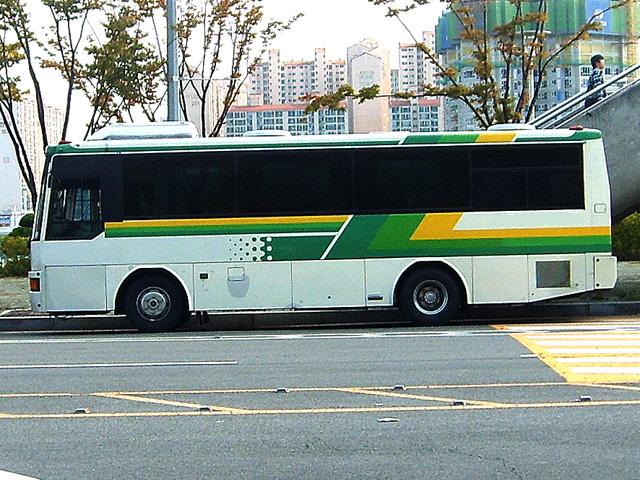
Asia Cosmos AM818.

- Asia Combi (AM805/815/825) - based on the Mazda Parkway
- Asia AM808 (Hino Liesse)
- Asia Cosmos (AM818) (Hino Rainbow)

=== Large bus ===
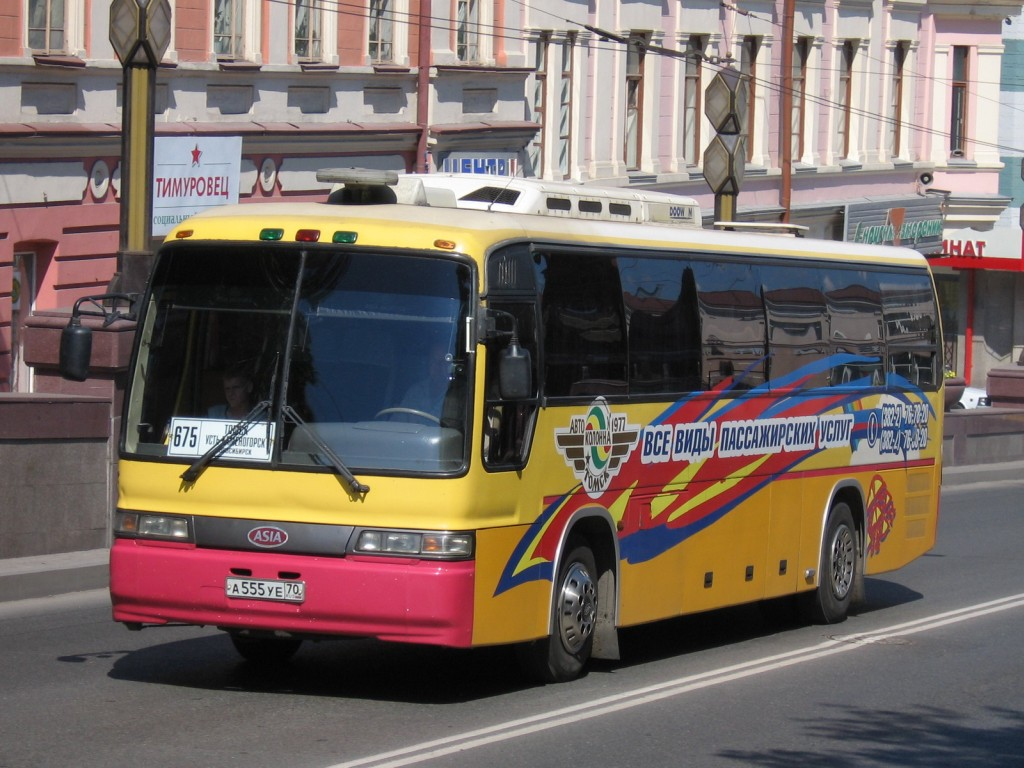
Asia Granbird in Russia

- Asia AM927 / AM937 / AM928 (city buses), AM929, AM939, AM949 (Gran Bird)

=== Truck ===
- Asia Granto (AM) truck (Hino Ranger)
- Asia AM420 (Hino Profia)

=== Other ===
- KM900 APC - license version of the Fiat 6614 Armoured Personnel Carrier for Republic of Korea Army.
- Asia Motors also assembled/distributed Massey Ferguson tractors:
  - Massey Ferguson 362A
  - Massey Ferguson 390A
