= K111 jeep =

K111 Jeep
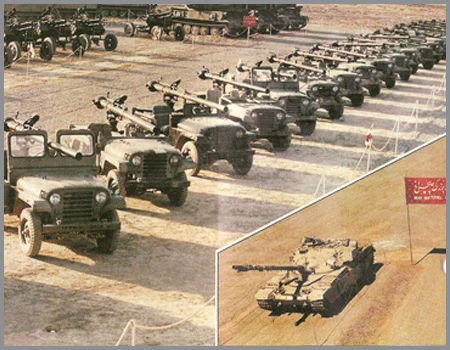
- Iranian K116 Jeeps
- Type: 1/4-ton truck
- Place of origin: South Korea

Service history
- In service: 1978–present
- Wars: Iran–Iraq War

Production history
- Designer: Agency for Defense Development; Kia Industries; Mazda (assistance)
- Designed: 1976–1978
- Manufacturer: Asia Motors
- Produced: 1978–1997

Specifications
- Engine: MVA-2000
- Transmission: 4-speed manual
- Suspension: progressive spring

The K111 "Jeep" is a 4x4 1/4-ton utility truck developed by Kia Industries and was produced by Asia Motors for the Republic of Korea Armed Forces in 1978. It is commonly known as Military Jeep (군용 지프), and its design is based on the M606 Jeeps. The export name of the vehicle is KM410.

== Development ==
In 1974, the United States had a plan to stop supplying military vehicles to South Korea. The Republic of Korea Armed Forces continued to negotiate with the U.S., but it was not an avoidable conclusion. South Korean military was operating various types of military Jeeps such as the US M38, M151, M606, and Japanese J601. In 1975, the Ministry of Defense of South Korea made a judgement that operational capability rate of these vehicles will start dropping in 1976 as the vehicles get older and will have difficulties receiving parts for each variants. Therefore, South Korean government used the situation as an opportunity to grow domestic production of military vehicles rather than relying on foreign vehicles.

On 24 April 1976, the Cabinet approved the "Domestic Production Plan for Military Vehicles (군용차량 국내생산 방안)" by the order of the President Park Chung Hee, and it was passed by the military council on 26 August. The plan was authorized on 28 September, and the Agency for Defense Development and Asia Motors were given 2 years to complete the project.

The Armed Forces demanded the vehicle to be based on the M606 Jeep with increase of power supply from 12V to 24V. The M606 was chosen because of compatibility of parts with Mitsubishi J601 Jeep, and both models were operated by the military. In addition, the M606 had excellent performance, simple structure, long lasting durability, and was easy to drive.

Firstly, developers disassembled a J601, and drew blueprints for each part with modifications. Then the development team placed an order to Fuji Ironworks to create a molding for the prototype. Most parts were produced by Asia Motors while parts for transmission and differential gearbox were produced by Kanda Ironworks. Through this process total of four prototypes were assembled: one domestic design, two J601 design, and a CJ-5 style. On 23 May 1977, these vehicles were presented at the Army Headquarters, but the military refused all and gave a new task to create a new style. The final appearance, created by Asia Motors and a Japanese stylist, was approved on 29 December.

Meanwhile, Asia Motors invited two professionals named Watanabe and Obayashi from technical partnership company Mazda to participate in vehicle testing. The first test was to off-roading for five days everywhere in the Korean peninsula. The test showed that the vehicle had about 40 problems, including the occasional breakdown of the MVA-2000, a militarized variant of VA-2000 engine. After three months of fix, engineers realized that the vertical installation of the engine caused failure of oil supply to the engine, thus overheating it. The engine was then leaned 30 degrees like civilian version to solve the issue. Other modifications include adding a muffler to reduce noise, changing the suspension from leaf spring to newly developed progressive spring, and better seats and cushions.

The upgraded prototypes were tested for 10,000 km driving in 90 days from February 1978, and 10,000 km more in 45 days from 5 June. Another tests were done between 2 March to 15 June for driving 112 days under the U.S. standard requirement, which included driving 3,120 km on paved road, 23,040 km on unpaved road, 3,840 km on off-roads. During the obstacle courses test, the vehicle slammed 70 cm tall obstacle at 60 km/h, resulting injury to a tester on passenger seat because he was not wearing seatbelt; the vehicle received damage on axle housing, thus was modified to withstand such impact.

After completing the tests, the vehicle was sent to Japan for further testing prior to mass production, and received "acceptable" from the partner company Mazda.

== Service history ==
=== Sri Lanka ===
The Sri Lanka Army deployed K111 (KM410) jeeps mounting Type 63 multiple rocket launchers against the Liberation Tigers of Tamil Eelam (LTTE) insurgents during the Sri Lankan Civil War (1983–2009).

== Variants ==
- K111 (KM410) ¼ ton Jeep (1978)
- K112 TOW ammunition carrier (1980)
- K113 TOW launcher vehicle (1980)
- K115 ambulance (1980)
- K116 (KM414) 106 mm recoilless rifle (1980)
- K117 searchlight vehicle (1982)
- KARV-1 autonomous vehicle (1992): An autonomous test vehicle. Installed computer, two cameras, two ultrasonic sensor, and one infrared sensor to the K111 for limited autonomous driving.
- Asia Rocsta: Civilian variant of the K111

== Users ==
- Bangladesh
- Iran: Purchased 14,200 K111 series jeeps between 1981 and 1988.
- Malaysia
- South Korea
- Sri Lanka

== See also ==
- K100 Jeep:
- Fath Safir: Iranian replacement of K111 series.

== General references ==
- Kassis, Samer (2003). 30 Years of Military Vehicles in Lebanon. Beirut: Elite Group. ISBN 9953-0-0705-5.
- Neville, Leigh (2018). Technicals: Non-Standard Tactical Vehicles from the Great Toyota War to modern Special Forces. New Vanguard series 257. Oxford: Osprey Publishing Ltd. ISBN 978-1-4728-2251-2.
- Sex, Zachary; Abi-Chahine, Bassel (2021). Modern Conflicts 2 – The Lebanese Civil War, From 1975 to 1991 and Beyond. Modern Conflicts Profile Guide. Vol. II. AK Interactive. EAN 8435568306073.
