= Fiat CM6614 =

FIAT 6614
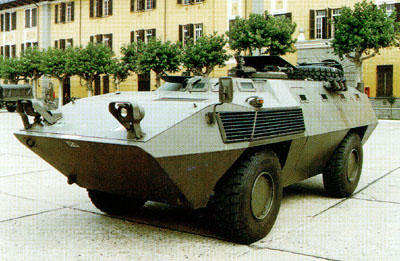
- FIAT 6614
- Type: Wheeled armoured personnel carrier
- Place of origin: Italy

Service history
- Used by: See below
- Wars: Somali Civil War; Libyan Crisis

Production history
- Manufacturer: FIAT-Oto Melara; Asia Motors (KM900 variants)
- Variants: 6616, 900, 901

Specifications
- Mass: 8,500 kg (1,340 st)
- Length: 5.86 m (19.2 ft)
- Width: 2.5 m (8.2 ft)
- Height: 1.78 m (5.8 ft)
- Crew: 1–2 crew + 8–10 passengers (CM6614 & KM900)
- Armour: Steel
- Main armament: CM6614 & KM900: 1 x MG 3 machine gun, K12 machine gun or 1 x .50 cal M2 machine gun CM6616: 1 x 7.62mm MG 3 machine gun or K12 machine gun 1 x 20mm Rheinmetall MK 20 Rh 202 autocannon
- Engine: 1 x Iveco 8062.24; 160hp @ 3,200rpm
- Suspension: wheeled 4x4
- Operational range: 700 km
- Maximum speed: 100 km/h (62 mph)

The Fiat CM6614 is a 4x4 wheeled armoured personnel carrier developed as a joint venture between Fiat and Oto Melara of Italy. The hull is welded steel, and the vehicle is amphibious. The first prototype was built in 1972.

== Description ==
The CM6614 hull is made of welded steel with uniform thickness of 8 mm; the driver's seat is on the front left of the vehicle and is equipped with five episcopes to the front and side of the driver which cover a field of vision of 200°. The engine with the transmission is located in on the front right side of the vehicle in order to have as much space as possible for the team of soldiers being transported. The crew compartment in the rear is equipped with a powered ramp for rapid disembarkation / embarkation of troops. There is also a hatch on both sides in the middle of the vehicle. Crew compartment has fume extractor, vision blocks and firing ports allowing troops to fire their personal weapons safely from the inside. The APC could be equipped with a simple manually operated turret armed with a 12.7 mm heavy machine gun and the turret could be folded down during airlift and strategic transportation. On each side of the turret there is an installation of three electrically operated fog/smoke grenade launchers.

The vehicle is amphibious and equipped with run-flat tires, in which the internal material is made of piano strings. Propulsion in the water is provided by the movement of wheels while buoyancy is achieved thanks to the shape of the vehicle. There's no trim vane however so the vehicle is not fully waterproof; the sensor detects the water level and automatically activates pumps to extract water from the vehicle. The Fiat CM6614 can be very useful in rescue missions and emergencies such as natural disasters and for this reason it is still in service with the mobile police of the State Police.

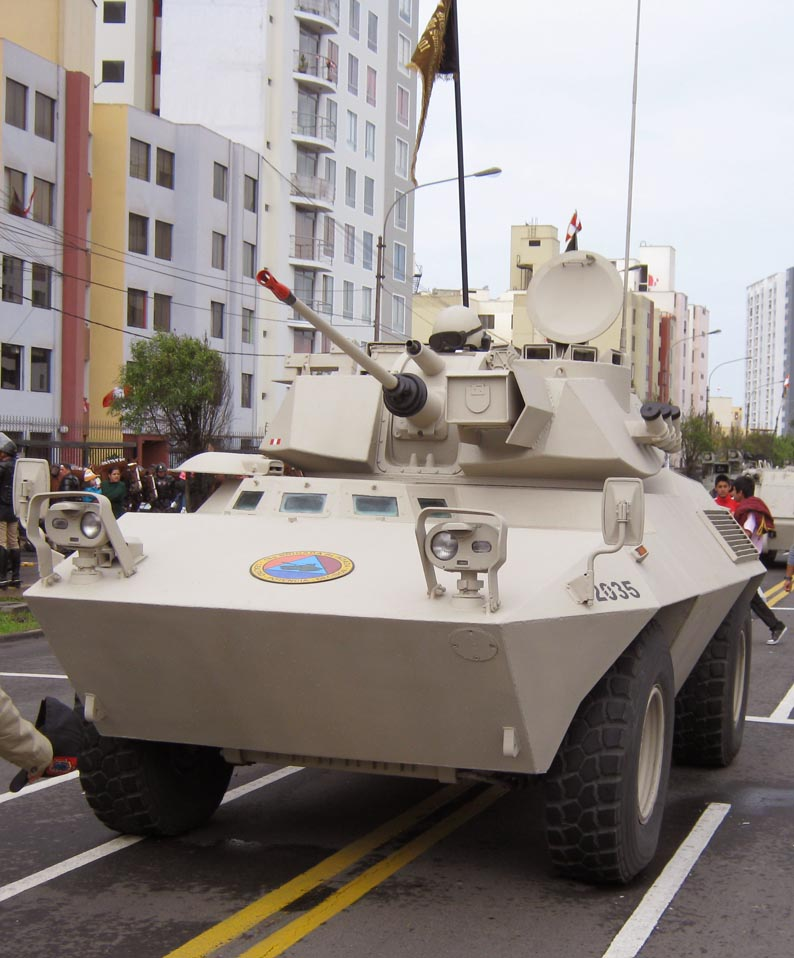
Fiat-6616 in 2011.

However, Italian-produced CM6614 in 1976 to 1977 showed major flaws in its armor steel during trials in South Korea. When a projectile impacts armor, the entire armor plate cracks like glass rather than creating a single hole. In addition, brand new vehicles also suffered cracks on the armor plate at high temperatures, cutting the vehicle into pieces without any human interference.

== Exports ==
=== South Korea ===
In the 1970s, South Korea came in need of wheeled armored vehicles to protect major cities and airfields against North Korean special forces by providing quick placement of defending troops. In 1976, South Korea received a sample of Thyssen Henschel UR-416 from West Germany and a CM6614 from Italy. South Korea originally selected UR-416 for license production; however, due to political tension between South Korea and the United States, the U.S. blocked NATO members from selling such armored vehicles to South Korea. After hearing a refusal from West Germany, South Korea turned its eye to Italian company Fiat, which was very eager to sell the CM6614, and signed a contract behind the curtain for a license under the designation KM900.

To avoid the restriction from NATO, Italy and South Korea smuggled CM6614 by shipping by parts to third countries, then rerouted to Pusan for transferring to Asia Motors (now Kia) for assembly. During the trial, South Korea found major flaws in Italian armor steel, thus requested transfer of armor steel and run-flat tire technology in order to fix the problem and strengthen logistics by producing locally. The transferred technologies were sent to Korean steel & tire manufacturing companies and research groups, and became the basis for future Korean-made armor steel that is used in current MBTs, SPHs, IFVs, and even by the navy's destroyers.

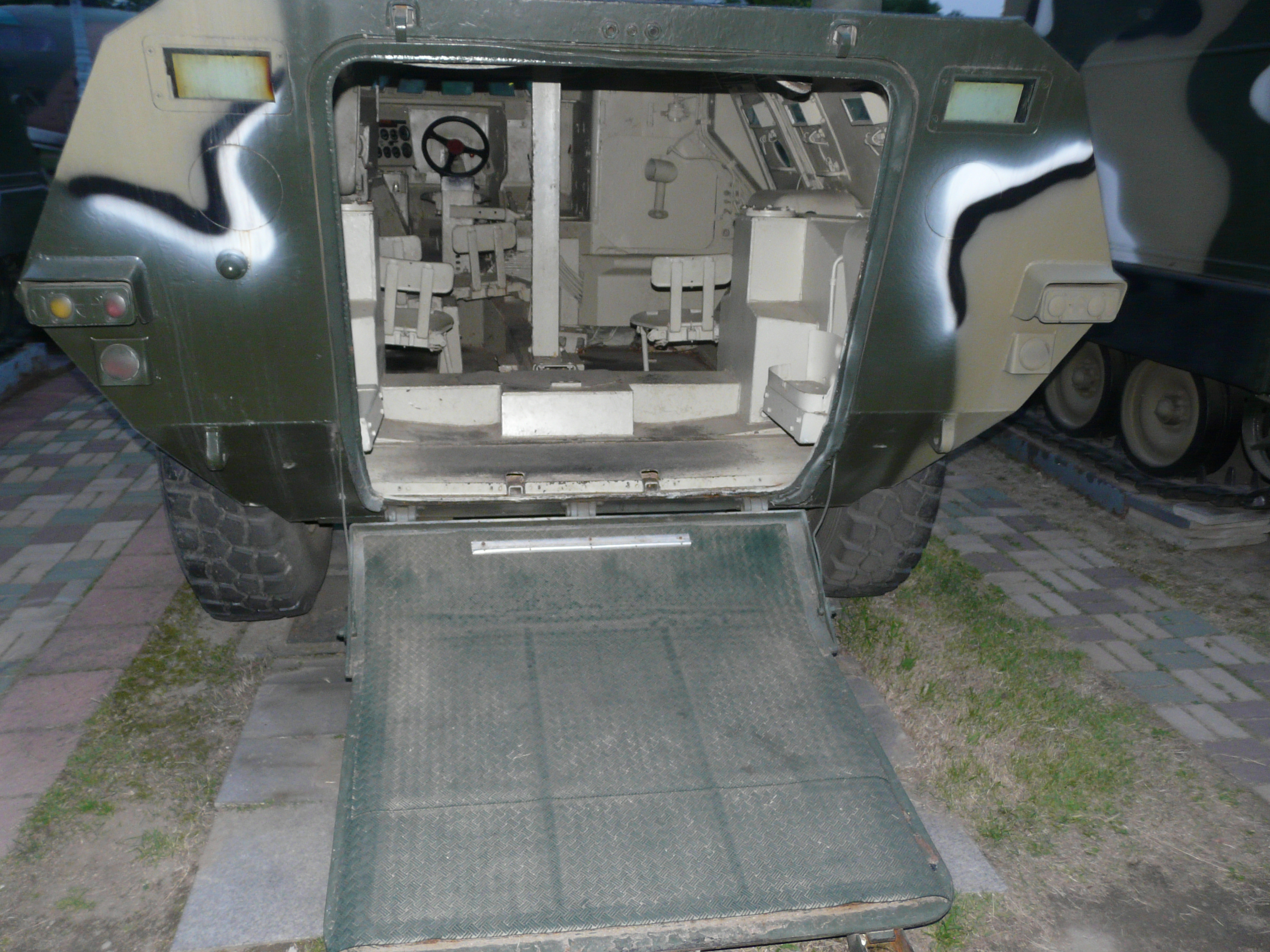
South Korean Fiat 6614.

KM900/KM901s were put in service since 1977, and were mainly used by the Republic of Korea Army Capital Defense Command, and airfield securities of the Republic of Korea Air Force. The ROKAF began replacing KM900/KM901 with K200A1 APCs since 1997. The ROKA also retired all these vehicles from active service by mid-2016, and will replace the inventory with newly developed K806/K808 APCs.

== Variants ==
=== CM6616 ===
The CM6616 was a version of the CM6614 that incorporated a turret armed with a 20mm autocannon. The turret was designed, built, and installed by OTO Melara.

=== KM900/KM901 ===
The KM900 was license produced version of the CM6614 by Asia Motors for use by the Republic of Korea Army and the Republic of Korea Air Force. The KM901 is a KM900 with a dozer blade on the front.

== Operators ==
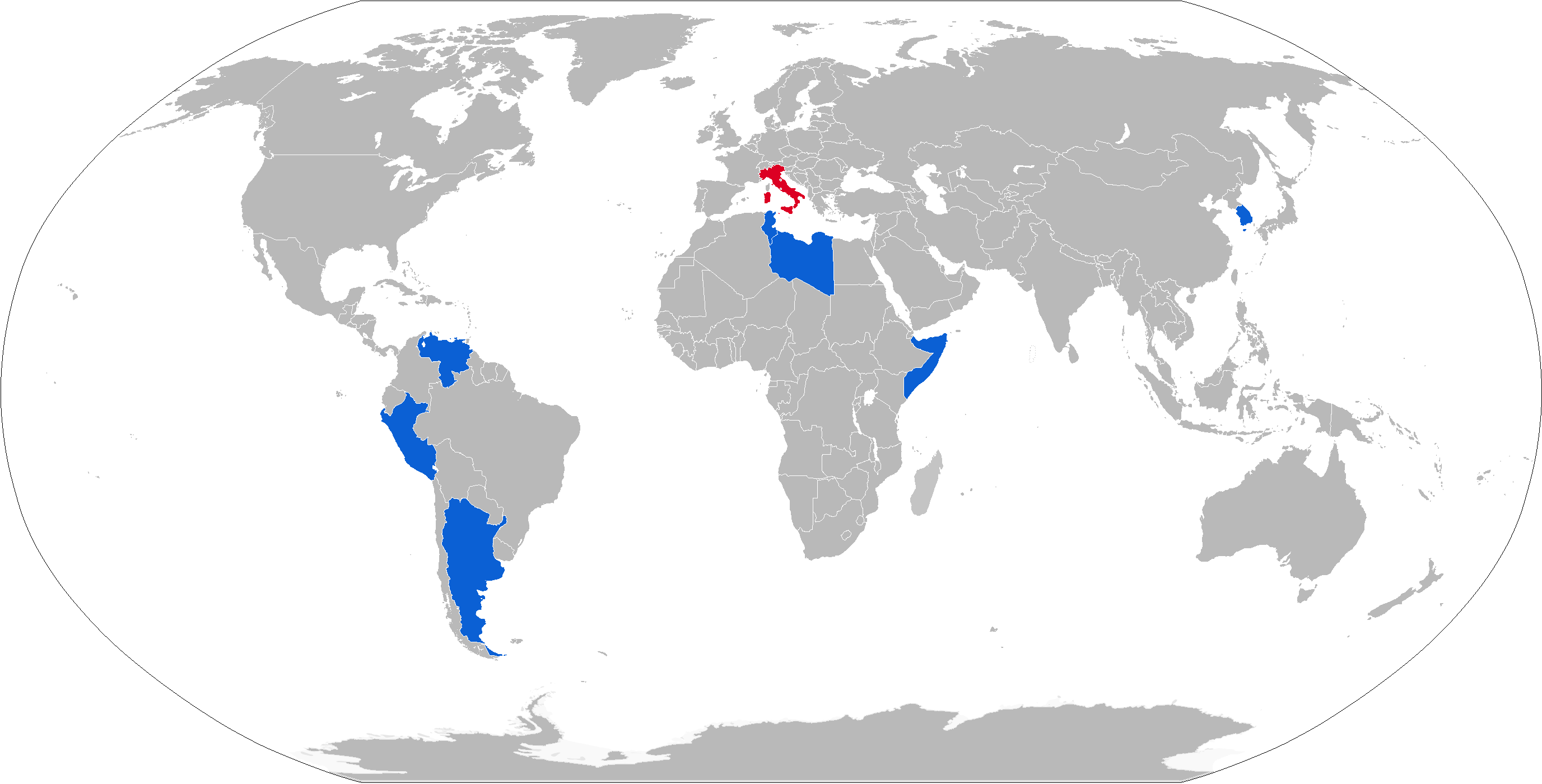
Map of Fiat 6614 operators in blue with former operators in red

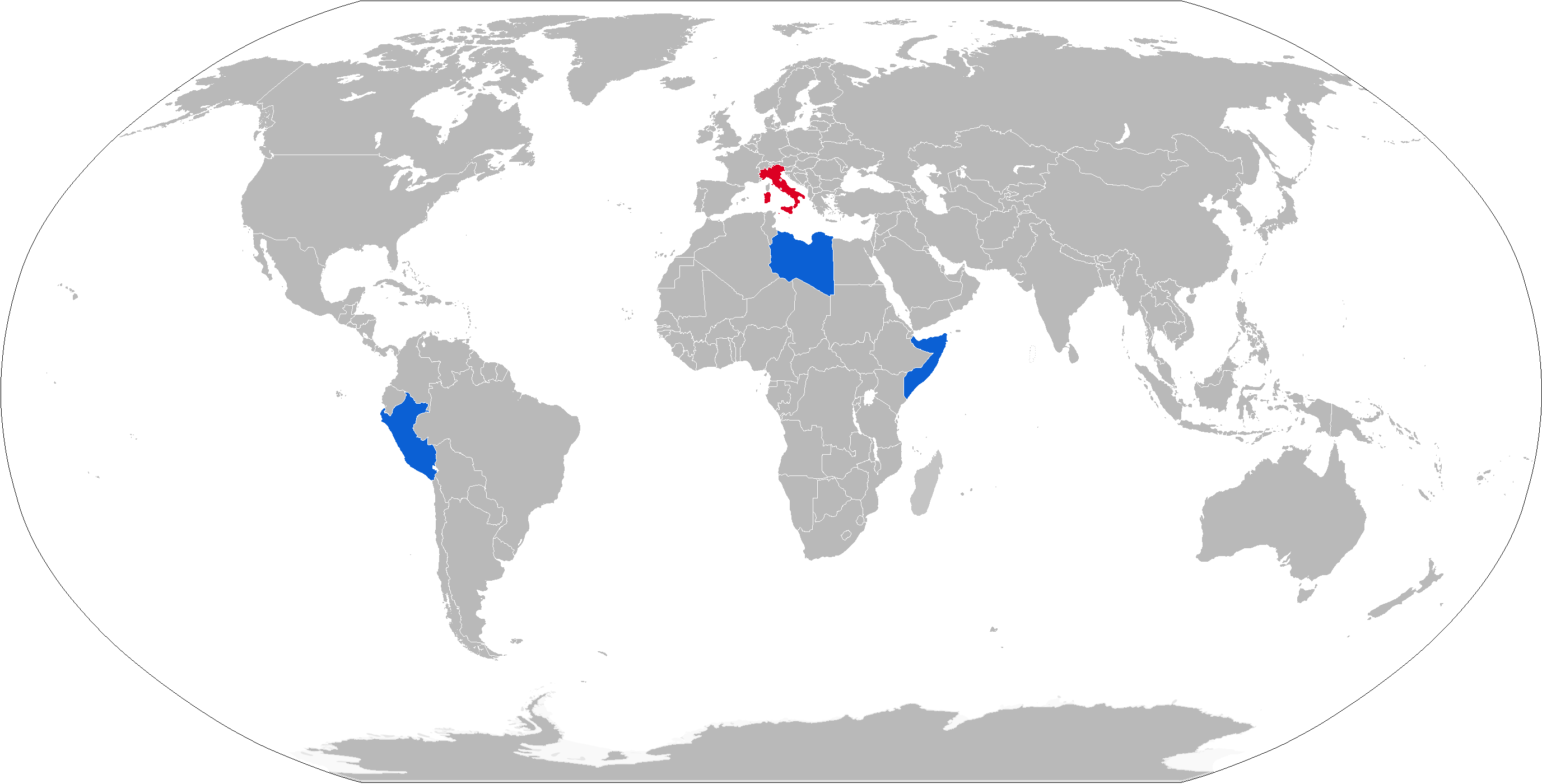
Map of Fiat 6616 operators in blue with former operators in red

=== Current operators ===
==== CM6614 ====
- Italy
  - Polizia di Stato
- Argentina - 25
  - State Police - 50
- Libya - 200
- Peru
  - Peruvian Army - 70
- Tunisia - 150
- Venezuela - 24

==== CM6616 ====
- Libya - 100
- Peru
  - Peruvian Army - 70

=== Former operators ===
==== CM6614 ====
- Italy
  - Italian Air Force - 110
  - Italian Army - 14
- South Korea - 400 at peak, retired in the mid-2010s.
  - Republic of Korea Army
  - Republic of Korea Air Force
- Somalia - 260

==== CM6616 ====
- Italy (all out of service)
  - Carabinieri - 52
- Somalia - 30

Note: Numbers reflect total orders/production for each country. Current holdings may be different.
