= Allan Johnson =

Allan Johnson may refer to:

- Allan Johnson (ice hockey) or Al Johnson (1935–2019), Canadian ice hockey player
- Allan Johnson (priest) (1871–1934), Anglican priest
- Allan G. Johnson (1946–2017), American writer

== See also ==
- Al Johnson (disambiguation)
- Alan Johnson (disambiguation)
- Alann Johnson (fl. 2014), American politician
- Allen Johnson (disambiguation)
- Alan Johnston (disambiguation)
