= Alan Johnson (disambiguation) =

Alan Johnson (born 1950) is a British Labour Party politician and former Home Secretary.

Alan Johnson may also refer to:

== Sportspeople ==
- Alan Johnson (Australian footballer) (born 1956), Australian rules footballer who played with Melbourne
- Alan Johnson (baseball) (born 1983), American baseball pitcher
- Alan Johnson (footballer, born 1947), English football player
- Alan Johnson (footballer, born 1971), English football defender
- Alan Johnson (racing driver) (born 1957), American dirt modified racing driver

== Other people ==
- Alan Johnson (choreographer) (1937–2018), film choreographer, best known for his work on Mel Brooks films
- Alan Johnson (political theorist), British socialist scholar
- Alan Johnson (priest) (fl. 1937–1958), Anglican archdeacon of Bombay
- Alan Johnson, a fictional character in the British TV series Peep Show played by Paterson Joseph
- Alan Bond Johnson (born 1939), United States district judge, United States District Court for the District of Wyoming
- Alan Campbell Johnson (1913–1998), British Liberal Party politician, journalist, and author
- Alan Scott Johnson (died 2003), American murder victim
- Alan Woodworth Johnson (1917–1982), English biochemist

== See also ==
- Al Johnson (disambiguation)
- Alann Johnson (fl. 2014), American politician
- Allan Johnson (disambiguation)
- Allen Johnson (disambiguation)
- Alan Johnston (disambiguation)
