= Al Johnson =

Al Johnson may refer to:

== Sportspeople ==
=== American football players and coaches ===
- Al Johnson (American football coach) (1922–2011), American football player and coach
- Al Johnson (defensive back) (born 1950), American football defensive back and running back
- Al Johnson (guard) (born 1979), American football guard

=== Other sportspeople ===
- Al Johnson (baseball executive) (1860–1901), American Major League Baseball team owner
- Al Johnson (basketball) (1913–1991), American professional basketball player in the NBL
- Al Johnson (pitcher) (fl. 1936), American baseball player
- Al Johnson (ice hockey) (1935–2019), Canadian ice hockey player

== Other people ==
- Al Johnson (musician) (1948–2013), American R&B singer who was a member of The Unifics
- Al Johnson (politician) (born 1939), Canadian Member of Parliament
- Al Johnson, owner of Al Johnson's Swedish Restaurant in Sister Bay, Wisconsin, United States
- Al "Carnival Time" Johnson (born 1939), New Orleans singer and pianist
- Albert Wesley Johnson (1923–2010), Canadian Broadcasting Corporation president
- Boris Johnson (born 1964), former prime minister of the United Kingdom, whose first name is Alexander and is called "Al" by his family

== See also ==
- Alan Johnson (disambiguation)
- Alann Johnson (fl. 2014), American politician
- Albert Johnson (disambiguation)
- Alfred Johnson (disambiguation)
- Allan Johnson (disambiguation)
- Allen Johnson (disambiguation)
- Alvin Johnson (disambiguation)
