= Alvin Johnson =

Alvin Johnson may refer to:

- Alvin J. Johnson (1827–1884), American publisher
- Alvin Saunders Johnson (1874–1971), American economist
- Al "Carnival Time" Johnson (Alvin Lee Johnson, born 1939), American singer and piano player
- Alvin Johnson (serial killer) (born 1941), American serial killer

== See also ==
- Alvin M. Johnston (1914–1998), test pilot
- Al Johnson (disambiguation)
