= Alan Johnston (disambiguation) =

Alan Johnston (born 1962) is a British journalist who was kidnapped and held for 4 months in 2007.

Alan or Allan Johnston may also refer to:

- Allan Johnston (politician) (1904–1974), member of the House of Commons of Canada
- Allan Johnston (Australian footballer) (1906–1944), Australian rules footballer
- Alan Johnston, Lord Johnston (1942–2008), Scottish Senator of the College of Justice
- Allan Johnston (born 1973), Scottish professional footballer
- Allan Johnston (psychiatrist), British psychiatrist
- Allan Johnston (advertiser), Australian advertising creative executive
- Alan Johnston (cricketer) (1953–2017), Irish cricketer
- Thomas Alan Johnston (1944–2024), Scottish engineer
- Alan R. Johnston (1914–1999), member of the Illinois House of Representatives

== See also ==
- Alan Johnstone (1858–1932), British diplomat
- Alan Johnson (disambiguation)
- Allen Johnson (disambiguation)
