= Libby Thompson =

American brothel owner

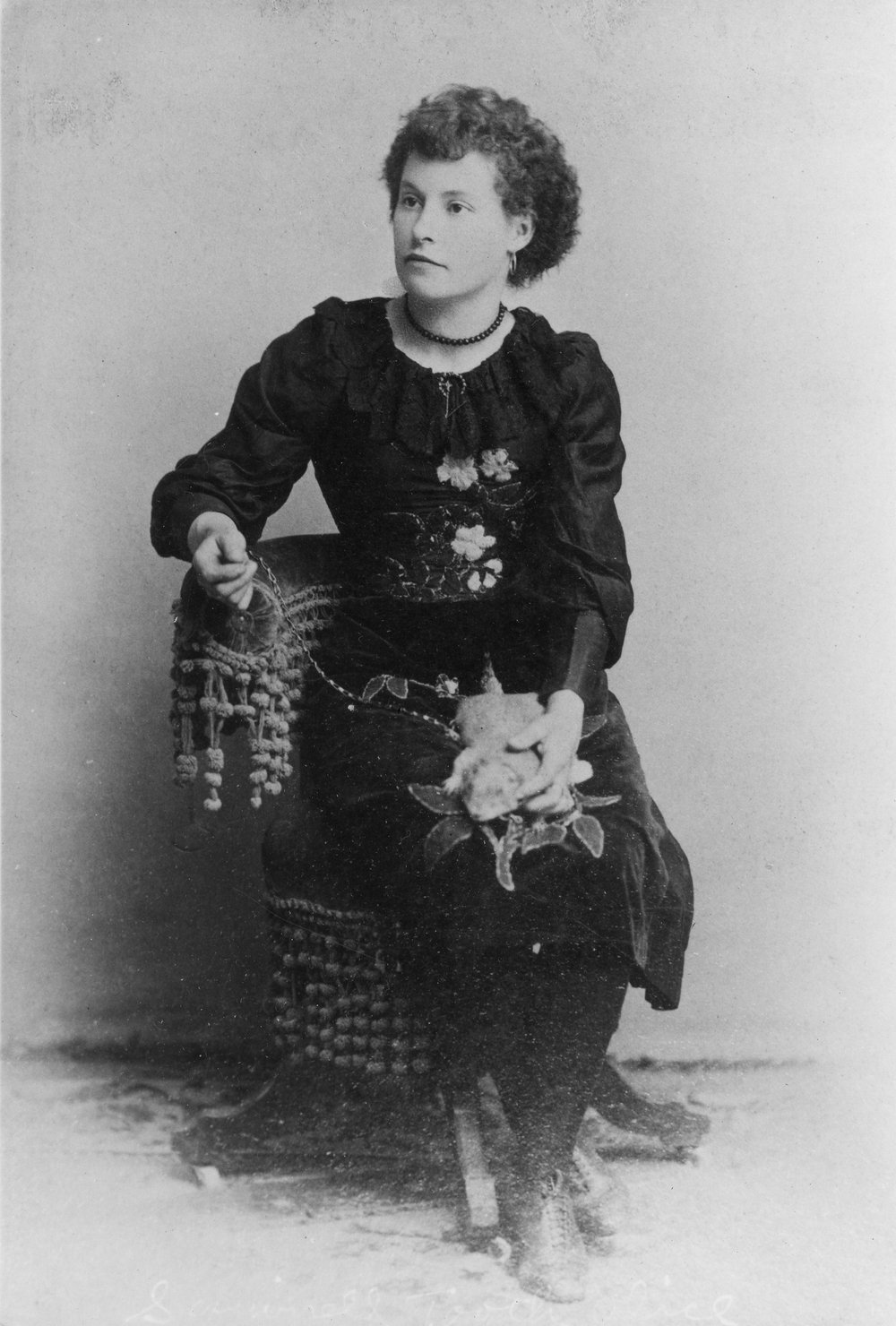
Thompson, c. 1880

Elizabeth Thompson (born Mary Elizabeth Haley; 18 October 1855 – 13 April 1953) was a prostitute and dance hall girl who worked in Dodge City, Kansas and other frontier cattle towns during the 1870s. She was the wife of famous gunman Billy Thompson and sister-in-law of Ben Thompson. She later became famous as Squirrel Tooth Alice, madam of a brothel in Sweetwater, Texas.

== Early life ==
Born Mary Elizabeth Haley in Belton, Texas, Haley had a difficult childhood. The family lost its fortune during the Civil War, and in 1864 Comanche Native Americans raided the Haley farm in Texas and took young Haley captive. She remained a captive until 1867 when her parents paid a ransom for her release. From this point forward, Haley was a marked woman. Even though she was only thirteen, many people assumed that she had sexually submitted to the Indians during her captivity. Haley found herself shunned and ostracized from society. She soon took up with an older man who did not care about her past, but James Haley found the idea of an older man taking advantage of his daughter so objectionable that he shot and killed the suitor. Haley's reputation was soiled even further.

== Life as a prostitute in the Old West ==
At the age of fourteen, Haley ran away from home in search of a fresh start. She wound up in Abilene, Kansas, but a young woman alone had few options. So she became a dance hall girl and prostitute. In Abilene, she hooked up with a gambler and part-time cowboy named William "Texas Billy” Thompson, brother of the notorious Ben Thompson. In 1870, the couple left Kansas for Texas and for the next couple of years Billy punched cows along the Chisholm Trail while Haley continued working as a dance hall girl in various towns across the southern prairie.

In 1872, at the age of seventeen, Haley was plying her trade in the cattle town of Ellsworth, Kansas, while Billy worked the gambling halls. By the spring of 1873, however, the couple was back out on the prairie with a spring cattle drive. Haley bore her first child on the open prairie and, to make the child legitimate, she and Billy got married that year.

In the summer of 1873, Billy Thompson, in a state of drunkenness, shot and killed Ellsworth town sheriff Chauncey Whitney. He was arrested but got the cattle company he worked for to bail him out. Because he was fearful of being shot himself by vengeful family members, Billy and Mary Thompson ran. The couple wound up in Dodge City, where Billy gambled and Mary worked as a dancer and prostitute. It was here that the Thompsons made the acquaintance of Wyatt Earp and his paramour, Mattie Blaylock.

After Dodge City, the Thompsons drifted to Colorado, but by 1876, they had moved to Sweetwater, Texas, which became their permanent home. In Sweetwater, the couple purchased a ranch outside of town and a dance hall in town. Mary ran the dance hall which was a front for a brothel. She was not embarrassed by her profession, and it was as a madam in Sweetwater that she became known for keeping her pet prairie dogs. These, along with a gap in her teeth, gave her the sobriquet, "Squirrel Tooth Alice."

== Later life ==
In 1897, after twenty-four years of marriage and nine children, Billy Thompson died of consumption. Libby Thompson continued running her Sweetwater brothel until she retired in 1921 at the age of 66. Although most of her sons had turned to crime and her daughters followed her into prostitution, she spent her elderly years living in Palmdale, California, among her various children's homes. On April 13, 1953, Libby Thompson died at the Sunbeam Rest Home in Los Angeles, California, at the age of 97.
