= Alfred Johnson =

Alfred Johnson may refer to:

- Alfred "Centennial" Johnson (1846–1927), Danish-born fisherman and sailor
- Alfred Wilkinson Johnson (1876–1963), U.S. Navy officer
- Alfred Johnson (author) (1879–1939), English author as A. E. Johnson
- Alfred F. Johnson (1884–1972), English academic librarian and expert in typography
- Alfred I. Johnson (1898–1977), Minnesota politician
- Al Johnson (musician) (1948–2013), American R&B singer, writer, arranger and producer
- Alfred E. Johnson, anthropologist and archaeologist at the University of Kansas
- Alfred C. Johnson, American molecular biologist

== See also ==
- Alfred Johnson Brooks (1890–1967), Canadian parliamentarian
- Al Johnson (disambiguation)
- Alfie Johnson (born 2001), English rugby league player
