= Mart Duggan =

American gunfighter

Martin J. Duggan (November 10, 1848 – April 9, 1888) was a gunfighter of the American Old West who, although mostly unknown today and one of the most underrated gunmen of the Old West, was at the time one of the more feared men in the west.

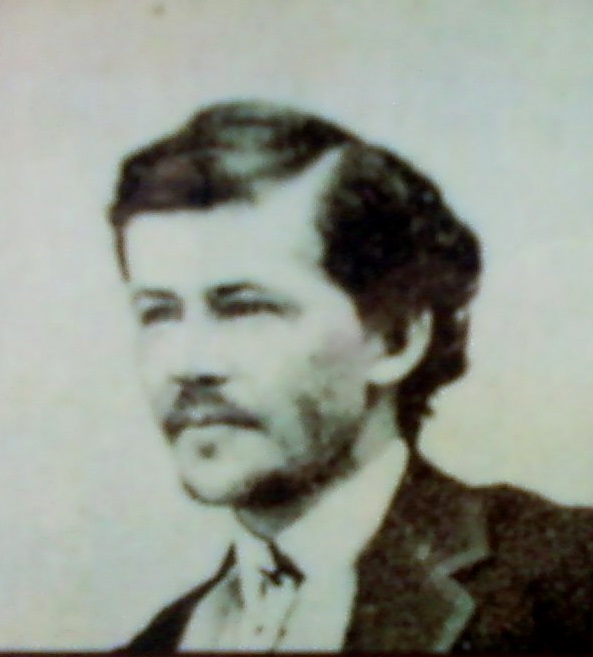

== Early life ==
Duggan was born Martin J. Duggan, in County Limerick, Ireland. He immigrated to the United States as a child, with his parents, and was raised in the Irish slums of New York City. In July, 1863, following the New York Draft Riots, Duggan left New York headed west. He drifted through the mining camps of Colorado, finding work as both a miner and a mule skinner. It is known that during this period, he was involved in numerous fights with Indians, alongside other miners and cowboys, although details of those events are sketchy at best. In 1876, having seen little success as a miner, and having developed into a strong man, Duggan began working as a bouncer in the Georgetown, Colorado saloon Occidental Dance Hall & Saloon.

=== First gunfight ===
Not long after accepting the position, Duggan disarmed a drunk who was brandishing his pistol, beating the man over the head with his own gun. The man threatened Duggan and said that, had it been a stand up gunfight, Duggan would not have fared so well. Duggan accepted the man's challenge and he threw the man's revolver into a corner. He then walked outside across the street and waited for the man to come out and confront him. The drunk man walked outside towards the street and the two faced one another about 30 feet apart, with many saloon patrons standing by to witness. In the gunfight that followed, the two quickly went for their pistols, but Duggan managed to shoot first, firing three bullets and hitting the man in the chest, killing him. The identity of the man has been relatively unknown for he hadn't been in town long enough to even pass his name along to others. Duggan was cleared in the shooting, it being ruled self defense.

== Life as a gunman and lawman ==
In the Spring of 1878, Duggan entered Leadville, Colorado, then a bustling mining town with his wife, Sophia, and his son, Arthur. At first, Duggan was mistaken for having been Sanford "Sam" Duggan, a bully who had terrorized several mining towns a decade earlier, due to the similarity in names. However, there were some present in town who were aware that Sam Duggan had been lynched in 1868, in Denver, Colorado, thus the confusion was cleared up.

On February 12, 1878, Horace Austin Warner Tabor, destined to later be one of America's wealthiest men, was elected mayor. At its founding in 1877, Leadville had some 300 residents, mostly miners. A mere one year later, by the time Duggan arrived, the town boasted a population near to 15,000. T. H. Harrison was appointed as the town's first Marshal, to quell the town's rising violent crime rate. Harrison, although thought to have a fearsome reputation, was beaten and run out of town a mere two days after his appointment.

Mayor Tabor then appointed George O'Connor as Marshal, and for one months time O'Connor did a commendable job. However, he was shot and killed less than five weeks after his appointment by one of his own deputies, Deputy Marshall James M. "Tex" Bloodsworth, on April 25, 1878, after O'Connor reprimanded Bloodsworth for spending too much time in saloons. Bloodsworth then fled on a horse he stole, and was never seen again in Leadville.

Mayor Tabor called an emergency session of the town council, and appointed Mart Duggan to replace O'Connor. Immediately Duggan began to receive threats that he could either leave town, or be killed. That same day, Duggan was called to the Tontine Restaurant due to a rowdy crowd of miners. He stood his ground against them, and backed them down. Although his first altercation had been successful, witnesses would later claim that they felt it would be short-lived.

Duggan immediately began ousting any he believed to affect his abilities at policing the town. His first order of business was to fire any deputies he suspected of being too friendly toward the criminal elements. He then walked into the office of the municipal magistrate, said to be too lenient in their judgements and demanded them to all resign. When the magistrate objected, saying the marshal had no such authority, Duggan pulled out his gun, threw it across the desk in a spinning motion and declared they are all arrested. In response to the confusion, he declared “I can blow any damn office alderman in this building”. Duggan then hand picked magistrate replacements and held court for six days, passing down sentences. The disposed magistrate later apologized to Duggan, and on his promise to do better in the future, returned to their posts. Although completely illegal and improper, Duggan's tactics were extremely effective, and were tolerated by the townspeople. He killed two men during this period, both in saloon shootings.

In late May, 1878, Duggan arrested August Rische, one of the wealthiest mine owners in Colorado at the time, for being drunk and disorderly. When Rische resisted, Duggan physically lifted him into the curb and escorted him to county jail. Rische was a friend to Mayor Tabor, who came to the jail to protest his arrest. However, Duggan did not back down, and Rische remained in jail until Duggan saw fit to release him. In some versions of the story, Mayor Tabor came upon Duggan while he was arresting Rische and ordered him to stop because Rische was an Alderman. In this version, Duggan handed Rische off to another officer and then placed the mayor under arrest for interfering and the mayor was forced to post bail, which he later forfeited. Later that same month, Duggan was called to the Pioneer Saloon, due to a disturbance in progress.

Miners John Elkins (a Black man) and Charlie Hines were quarrelling over a pot at a poker game. A fight ensued, and Elkins stabbed Hines with a knife, then fled. Two of Duggan's deputies quickly located Elkins and arrested him without incident. However, when word spread that Hines was dying, racial hatred began to spread throughout the town, and a lynch mob was formed. Duggan ran to head off the mob, who was headed for the jail. Cocking a revolver in each hand, he informed them he would kill the first man who took another step forward. The mob, numbering no less than 100 men, dissipated. Hines eventually did recover from his wound. Elkins was found to have acted in self-defense, and fled town immediately upon his release.

Duggan was dismissed from duty as Marshal after a February, 1879 drinking binge in which he threatened passersby who looked suspicious, repeatedly waving his handgun at their faces. He was quickly reinstated when it became obvious no one could replace him at that time, given the town's rowdy status. On March 10, 1879, Bill and Jim Bush, businessmen and also friends to Mayor Tabor, became involved in a dispute on a vacant lot with Mortimer Arbuckle, another businessman who had evidently set up his small shanty shack business on a lot belonging to the Bush brothers. In the heat of a physical exchange, Jim Bush pulled a pistol and shot Arbuckle, killing him. Arbuckle was unarmed, and was well liked in town. Another mob formed, intent on burning the hotel owned by Bill Bush, and hanging Jim Bush. Duggan again backed down the mob, and arrested Jim Bush for murder. By dawn the next day, it was apparent that trouble was again brewing, so Duggan took Jim Bush, under guard, to Denver, for safe keeping until trial. Leadville businessman G. W. Bartlett would later claim years later, "There was not a braver man in camp", speaking of Duggan.

Duggan left the Marshal's position for Leadville in April, 1879, when his term expired, stating he wished to move to Flint, Michigan with his wife. He was replaced by Pat Kelly, another Irishman, but Kelly lacked the abilities and raw aggression that Duggan possessed, and within months the town of Leadville had reverted to its former rowdy state. Gangs of hoodlums began taking over businesses and city property at gun point, led by Edward Frodsham, from Brigham, Utah. Frodsham was known to have killed a man named John Peasley in Wyoming, after Peasley became involved in an affair with Frodsham's wife. Sentenced to ten years in prison, he was released after only two.

Frodsham was a jeweler by trade, but had a fearsome temper, and was good with a gun. On August 8, 1879, Frodsham and friend Lee Landers, the latter an escaped convict, became involved in a gunfight in Laramie, Wyoming with two men inside Susie Parker's brothel, killing a cattle dealer named Jack Taylor. Frodsham was wounded by two bullets in the gunfight, and was arrested, but posted bail. Frodsham then moved to Leadville, and the same month of his arrival, on December 29, 1879, he shot and killed Peter Thams, a Laramie resident, after the latter argued with him over the Taylor shooting. Marshal Kelly, perhaps out of fear, refused to arrest Frodsham for the murder. Lake County, Colorado Deputy Sheriff Edmund H. Watson, however, stepped in and did arrest Frodsham. Vigilantes stormed the jail and took both Frodsham and outlaw Patrick Stewart out of the jail two days later, and lynched them.

With the town totally out of control, the council fired Pat Kelly, and sent for Mart Duggan once again. Duggan returned in late December, 1879, and immediately fired all of Kelly's deputies, hiring men of his own choosing. He then went about arresting any he believed to be causing problems, including local thugs "Big Ed" Burns, "Slim Jim" Bruce, J. J. Harlan, as well as well known gunman Billy Thompson, brother to gunfighter Ben Thompson. By April, 1880, Leadville was again under control and Duggan again refused reappointment. He was replaced by Ed Watson, whose arrest of Frodsham had gained him respect in and around the town.

== Later career ==
In May, 1880, Duggan led several others in the employ of former mayor Tabor to help end a miners' strike over wages, and within a month the strike had ended. On November 22, 1880, Duggan argued with miner Louis Lamb, with whom he'd had previous confrontations. Lamb walked away, but Duggan was still enraged. Duggan continued to verbally yell at Lamb, who walked as far as the front of the Purdy Brothel, where he turned and pulled his pistol. Duggan drew also, shooting Lamb in the mouth, killing him instantly. He turned himself in following the shooting and was later cleared on grounds of self-defense. Lamb's widow, however, swore an everlasting hatred toward Duggan, and swore she would wear her widow's weeds until Duggan's death, and that she would dance on his grave.

Although cleared in the shooting, Duggan lost a lot of his popularity over the shooting of Lamb, who was well liked in the community. Duggan had opened a livery stable, but after the shooting his business failed altogether in 1882. He moved to Douglass City, Colorado, where he became a deputy, and tended bar. Duggan would leave Leadville in 1882 and purchase the Soda Springs hotel, but after two years, it failed within two years, said to have been partially due to "the lavishness of his hospitality". He would return to Leadville by 1885, living in a home on West Fourth Street.

1885 would prove a difficult year for Duggan. He found himself in debt and needing to start again in Leadville. Fortunately, his two brothers, Steve, his elder brother, and Tom, his second youngest brother were there to support him. Both were well known around the community. Steve owned a saloon on Harrison Avenue and Tom tended the bar. But, in late 1884, Tom left to see what the excitement in Aspen was all about. When he came back, everyone noted he was much changed. He'd gone from being very personable and affable to melancholic. In the weeks that followed, his mood worsened and a doctor was called. He was diagnosed with Typhoid Pnuemonia and brought to live in Mart's house where he was tended to by Mart's wife, Sophia. Sophia became alarmed by his behavior, particularly his fixation on items like a shaving razor, which he looked at so intently, in such a peculiar manner, she felt compelled to hide it. His residency at their house would not last long, as on Sunday, January 11th, around 2pm, he got up out of bed, dressed himself, spoke with Sophia in the kitchen, and returned to his room and she followed, asking how he was. He told her he was alright and she went back to the kitchen. The he sat down in an arm chair and shot himself through the heart. Mart and Steve were crazed by grief at his suicide, and Sophia was devastated. By mid-October of the same year, Mart Duggan went on a bender, drinking heavily for days. Even his friends described him as crazy at the time. The event culminated in him walking into the Opera House club rooms and shooting his reflection in the mirror with his forty-five Colt revolver. He then went to exit the room, raised his revolver, and ordered everyone to get back (though there were thankfully few present to witness this). He then went to the Clarendon club rooms where he repeated the reflective glass destruction and then turned his back to the bar. A few seconds later he was placed under arrest, which he did not resist.

In 1887, when a conman tricked several dance hall girls into buying fake jewelry, Duggan hunted the man down, beat him, then made him return all the money he had taken, using the remainder of his money to pay for drinks for everyone present at the dance hall until he was broke. Duggan then escorted the conman out of town.

The salesman immediately went to Leadville, where Duggan was not popular. He filed charges of robbery and assault against Duggan, who appeared in court to face the charges along with a string of dance hall girls as witnesses. The judge acquitted Duggan on the charge of robbery, but fined him $10 for assault. Duggan flew into a rage, demanding that if anyone should pay, it should be the salesman. Seeing Duggan's temper, the salesman dropped the charges and fled town.

Later that year, Duggan returned to Leadville to accept a job as a patrolman. However, Leadville had by this time progressed well beyond the bustling mining camp he had policed a decade earlier, and had become civilized. Duggan and his techniques, however, were unchanged. In March, 1888, Duggan arrested a jewelry peddler, and when the charges were dropped and Duggan was fined $25 for unlawful arrest, he resigned from the police force. Duggan began drinking heavily for the next month and was involved in several disputes.

On April 9, in the early morning hours, Duggan became involved in an argument with two gamblers, William Gordon and gambler and business owner Bailey Youngston, inside the Texas House. Duggan invited them both outside to settle the dispute with guns, but fearing his reputation they both refused. At around 4:00 am, friends were able to calm Duggan and convince him to go home. He left the Texas House, but had walked only a few steps on Harrison Avenue before someone approached him from behind and shot him in the back of the head, then fled. Duggan did not immediately go down, and staggered next door to the Bradford Drug Store, where he fell. His wife was called, and she sat with him along with many of his friends until well into the morning.

He opened his eyes some hours later and asked for a drink of water. When asked who had shot him, and had it been Bailey Youngston, he replied, "No. And I'll die before I tell you". Duggan died at 11:00 am on April 9, 1888. It has never been discovered why he chose to withhold the name of his killer. Despite some of the problems he'd had, Duggan was still highly respected and his death was mourned by the whole of Leadville, with a large attendance at his funeral. Bailey Youngston, along with his business partners Tom Dennison and Jim Harrington and employee George Evans, were arrested for his murder, tried, but acquitted due to a lack of evidence. The widow of Louis Lamb danced where Duggan had been shot down, and presented her widow's weeds to Duggan's wife.

Following his death, his widow was denied his life insurance payout of $5,000 as the insurance company claimed he brought the misfortune on himself. She fought for his death to be declared accidental and won in court.

Although no one was ever convicted in his murder, most believed that George Evans had been paid to murder Duggan by a group of men who held grudges against him from years earlier. This could never be proven. Evans left town immediately after being acquitted, and was killed in a gunfight in Nicaragua in 1902.

Police appointments
Preceded by George O'Connor	City Marshal of Leadville, Colorado; 1878–1879	Succeeded by Patrick A. Kelly
Preceded by Patrick A. Kelly	City Marshal of Leadville, Colorado; 1879–1880	Succeeded by Ed Watson
