= Arthur Larkin House =

- U.S. National Register of Historic Places
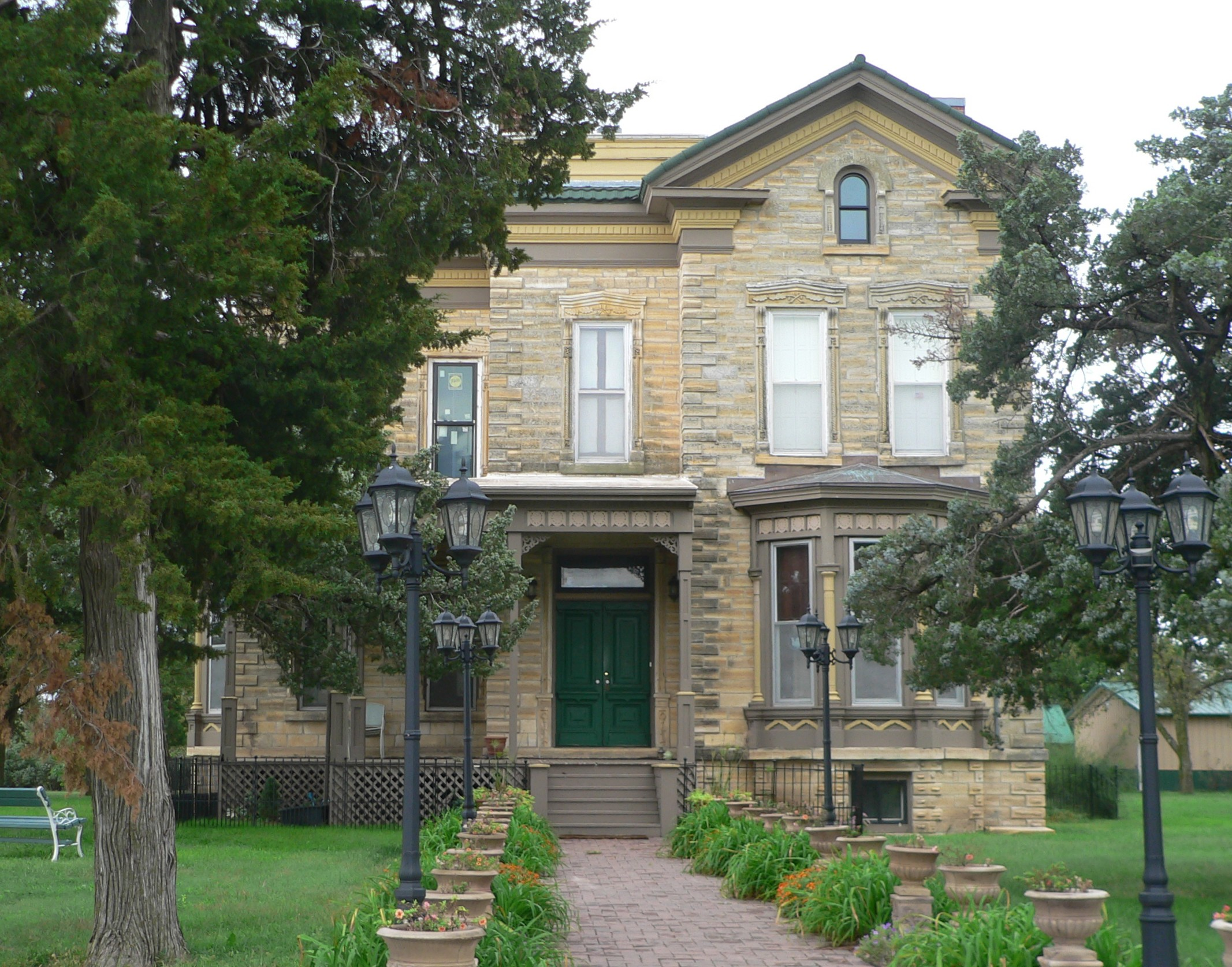

- Location within Kansas
- Location: 1126 Hwy 14, near Ellsworth, Kansas
- Coordinates: 38.72228°N 98.23726°W
- Area: 4 acres (1.6 ha)
- Built: 1884–1885
- Architectural style: Italianate
- NRHP reference No.: 75000712
- Added to NRHP: February 24, 1975

The Arthur Larkin House, in Ellsworth County, Kansas, near the city of Ellsworth, was built during 1884–1885 and was listed on the National Register of Historic Places in 1975. It was deemed significant for association with businessman Arthur Laskin, and for its architecture.

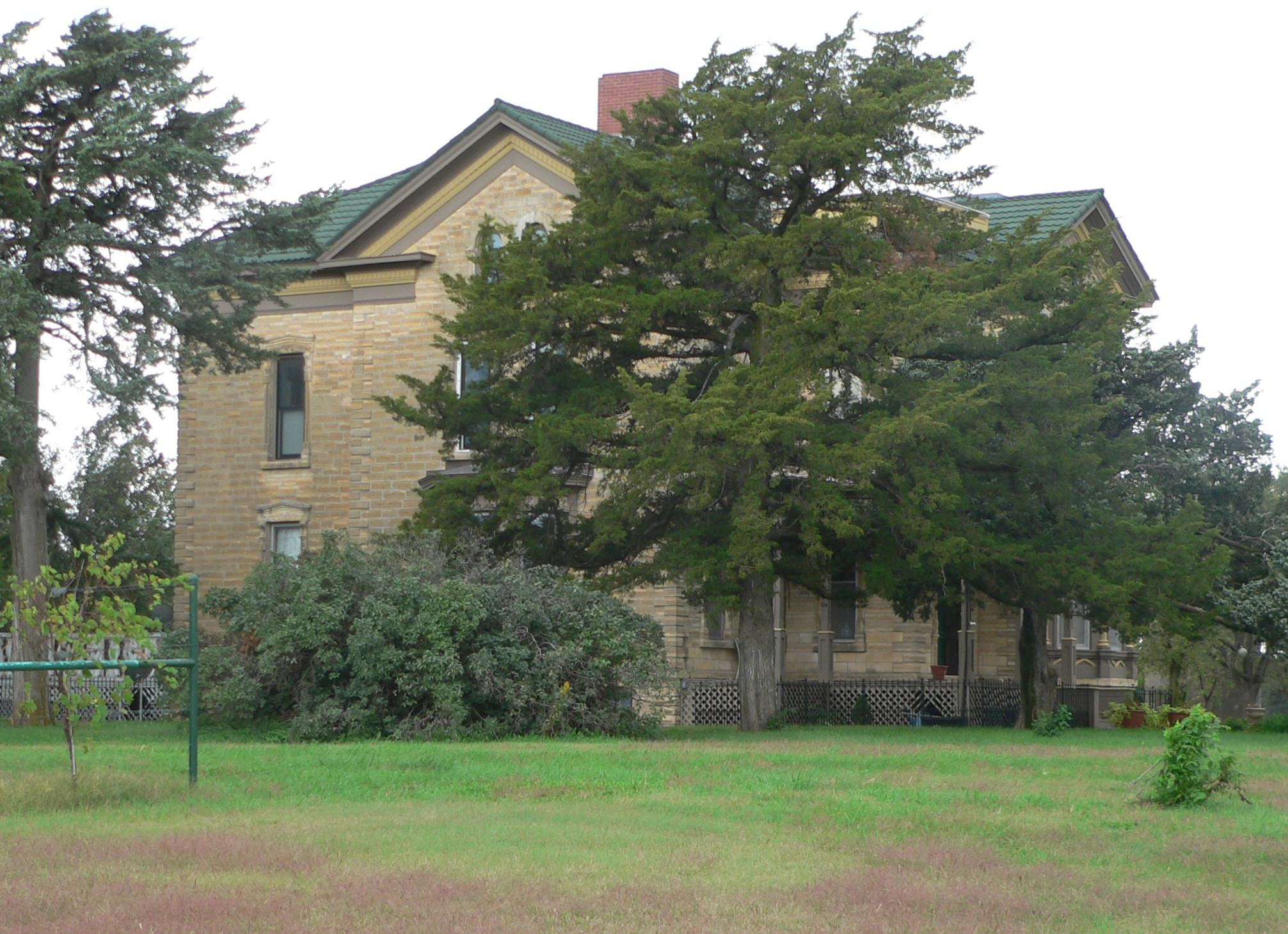
View from northeast

It is a north-facing house about 65 by 50 feet (20 m × 15 m) in plan, and rises 35 feet (11 m) from ground to the peak of its roof. Built of dressed stone, it is Italianate in style. Originally it had a higher cupola on its north end.

When its construction was nearing completion, the local Ellsworth Reporter ventured that "A. Larkin is completing his residence on the south side of the river. When finished it will be the most handsome residence in the vicinity."

Natural gas from wells on the property was used for heating and lighting, in advance of general practice in the area. The cupola held a gas burner with a reflector that made a glow seen from miles away.

The house is located 0.25 miles (0.40 km) south of Ellsworth, across Smoky Hill River, off what was State Highway K-45 in 1974. Its address is now 1126 Highway 14, Ellsworth, KS 67439. The city of Ellsworth has apparently annexed land to its south, extending to the house's property and jumping over it. The boundary of the main part of the city now extends down to the north edge of the Arthur Larkin House property. And the city now includes an exclave of property from the south edge of the Larkin House extending south about a half mile further down Highway 14.
