= A. J. Johnson =

A. J. Johnson may refer to:

- AJ Johnson (basketball) (born 2004), American men's basketball player
- A. J. Johnson (bowler) (born 1992), American bowler
- A. J. Johnson (cornerback) (born 1967), American football cornerback
- A. J. Johnson (linebacker) (born 1991), American football linebacker
- Adrienne-Joi Johnson (born 1963), American actress and dancer, sometimes credited as A. J. Johnson
- Alvin J. Johnson (1827–1884), American publisher, also known as A. J. Johnson
- Amanda "AJ" Johnson (born 1990), American women's basketball player
- Anthony Johnson (actor) (1966–2021), American film actor, sometimes credited as A. J. Johnson

== See also ==
- A. J. John, an Indian politician, Chief Minister of Travancore-Cochin
