= Morcos =

Morcos is a surname that may refer to the following people:

- Jacques Morcos, American neurosurgeon
- Paul Morcos, Minister of Information of Lebanon
- Rauda Morcos, Palestinian–Israeli lesbian poet and LGBTQ activist

== See also ==
- John Morco, lawman of the American Old West
