= Billy Thompson (gunman) =

American gunman and gambler

Billy Thompson, sometimes known as Texas Billy Thompson (c. 1845 – September 6, 1897) was an Old West gunman and gambler, the younger brother of the famous gunman and lawman Ben Thompson, and husband of Libby Thompson, better known as “Squirrel Tooth Alice.” The younger Thompson brother never achieved the fame that his brother achieved, and in his own lifetime was mainly referred to as the unpredictable and troubled younger brother of Ben Thompson. Factually, however, while a dangerous man, he also was a formidable opponent in a gunfight.

== Early life, first gunfight ==
Born William Thompson in Knottingley, Yorkshire, England, immigrating with his family and older brother to the United States as a child. His family settled in Texas, and during the American Civil War, both his brother and he volunteered for the Confederate Army. His older brother went on to fame as a gunman and later as a lawmen and chief of police for Austin, Texas. Ben Thompson was more stable than his younger brother, having an even temperament, albeit accompanied by a deadly side if need be. Known as having a violent and quick temper, the younger Thompson often found himself in trouble, usually from violence.

His first known gunfight was on March 31, 1868. That day, while attending a fist fight between a White man and an African American man, a US soldier named William Burke became upset that the townspeople favored the black man, this being partly because the army was seen by locals as an occupying force following the war. When he lashed out verbally at Billy, the two argued, then later Burke apologized, asking to buy Billy a drink. The two men spent two hours drinking, then went to a bordello together. They argued a few times over minor things during their time together, but for the most part, they seemed to have gotten along. After they entered the bordello, Billy Thompson went upstairs with a prostitute, and for reasons unknown, William Burke again flared his temper against Thompson, and began walking the halls shouting threats against him. Finding the room in which Billy had entered, Burke kicked in the door armed with a pistol, and after the two exchanged shots, Burke fell badly wounded, and died the next day. Feeling he would certainly hang for killing a soldier, Thompson fled.

== Notoriety as a killer ==
Thompson quickly ran out of money, and sent word to his older brother, a habit he would never break. Two months after the Burke killing, while in Rockport, Texas, Billy Thompson killed another man, Remus Smith, and again fled to avoid arrest. In that instance, Smith, an 18-year-old stable hand, slapped Billy's horse when it tried to nose in on some feed, which enraged Thompson. When he yelled at the boy, Smith, who was unarmed, told him to take off his pistols and come on, at which point Billy Thompson drew his gun and shot the boy twice. Remus Smith was well liked in the area, and some of the county residents hunted for Billy Thompson for the remainder of his lifetime.

For five years, he stayed on the run, often contacting his brother to help him with money. On April 18, 1873, Billy Thompson checked into the Grand Central Hotel in Ellsworth, Kansas. His older brother Ben joined him two months later, and the two set themselves up in the saloon, Joe Brennan's, as house gamblers. At the time, Ellsworth was an extremely busy cattle town. Sheriff Chauncey Whitney was both well liked in the county, and extremely effective as a lawman. Within a short time of their arrival in town, both Thompson brothers became good friends with Whitney, but at the same time, often had bad experiences with local police officer John "Happy Jack" Morco. Officer Morco was well known for his boasting about how many men he had killed, often heard to say he had shot 12 men dead.

On June 30, 1873, Morco arrested Billy Thompson for carrying a weapon in town limits. Though angered, Thompson paid his fine. On August 15, 1873, Billy Thompson was drinking heavily, and had become extremely intoxicated and vocal. Sheriff Whitney had planned to leave town that day with his family, but feeling Billy might get himself into trouble, he chose to remain in town. That day, Ben Thompson introduced John Sterling into a high-stakes game, on the pretense that due to his introduction, Thompson would take a percentage of any winnings. When Sterling left the saloon with over $1,000, without offering Ben Thompson his share, the latter sought him out. He found Sterling in another saloon, in the company of John Morco.

When Thompson demanded his cut of the winnings, Sterling, aware that Thompson was unarmed, slapped him. John Morco then pulled his pistol and backed Thompson away. Morco and Sterling then stood outside the saloon, yelling for Ben Thompson to come out and fight. Billy Thompson, hearing of his brother's troubles, ran to help him. Both brothers armed themselves, and walked out into the street. Hearing of the trouble, Sheriff Whitney responded, unarmed, and confronted the Thompsons, imploring them to accompany him for a drink and talk the situation over, to which they agreed.

As they walked to Brennan's, Morco and Sterling moved to intercept them. When another Texan yelled a warning to Ben Thompson, the latter turned and fired a rifle shot at the pair, and heard his brother fire his shotgun from behind him. Turning, Ben Thompson saw his friend Sheriff Whitney wither to the ground, shot. Believed to have been accidental, Billy Thompson did not rush to flee. Ben Thompson, upon seeing what had happened, stated, "My God Billy, you have shot your best friend", to which Billy responded, "I'm sorry", followed by Whitney stating, "He did not intend to do it, it was an accident, send for my family". According to later witnesses, Billy Thompson was not looking at Whitney, as Whitney was standing to his side, and had his shotgun cocked, with one barrel suddenly going off.

In later versions of that shooting, it was said his response to his brother Ben, when the latter said, "you've shot your best friend", was, "I'd have shot him if he'd been Jesus Christ". That never happened, nor was it ever said, a fact verified by witnesses years later at his trial. It would be the main fact of Billy Thompson's life that over the decades since has become completely distorted from what actually happened. However, rumors such as that fueled his notoriety, in the shadow of his older brother's fame.

Despite the shooting being accidental, Ben Thompson forced Billy on a horse and ordered him to flee town, but instead of riding fast, he simply rode slowly through, yelling for anyone who wanted to fight to come get him. Ben feared, probably wisely, that regardless of the circumstances surrounding the shooting, Billy would be lynched. Sheriff Whitney died on August 18, 1873, resulting in a $500 reward being placed on Billy Thompson. Morco and Officer Ed Hogue ran Neil Cain, a Texas cowboy and friend to the Thompson brothers, out of town at gun point.

John "Happy Jack" Morco was fired over his having instigated the trouble, but not before he issued a warrant against Ben Thompson for assault, resulting in officer Ed Hogue arresting Ben. A short time later, the town council dismissed the entire police force, replacing it with new personnel. Citizens vocally expressed their anger toward visiting Texas cowboys in town from cattle drives. Town Marshal Ed Crawford instigated a dispute, then beat one Texas cowboy, Cad Pierce, to death with his pistol during an arrest, after first shooting him in the side, and groups of vigilantes roamed the streets looking to run out of town any Texans they found causing trouble.

Not long after the Whitney killing, Morco, during a rant of boasting during a dispute with one Texan, was shot and killed by newly appointed Ellsworth police officer J. C. Brown in front of the Lizzie Palmer Dancehall. Ed Crawford was shot and killed a short time afterward by friends of Pierce, and Ed Hogue left town. With the shooting deaths of Sheriff Whitney and Remus Smith, Thompson became known as the troubled and dangerous younger brother of Ben Thompson, although this was not exactly the truth. With the exception of Remus Smith, which was a clear case of cold-blooded murder, his other two shootings had been one in self defense and another accidental.

== Life on the run ==
For the next several years, Billy Thompson lived on the run from lawmen and bounty hunters. The Aransas County, Texas, Sheriffs Office regularly sent out warrants to Texas lawmen around the state, seeking Thompson for the murder of Remus Smith. In June 1874, Billy Thompson narrowly escaped capture in Austin, Texas. Later that same year, he was captured in Mountain City, Texas, but escaped and fled to San Antonio, Texas, where he entered the Long Horse brothel with a friend. While there, he hit a prostitute across the face, fleeing when two city police officers responded, resulting in a foot pursuit in which he again escaped.

He avoided lawmen for another two years, until Texas Ranger Captain John Sparks caught up to him in October, 1876, in Travis County, Texas. Sparks was leading a small Ranger unit that was actually seeking rancher Neal Cain for cattle rustling. While raiding the Cain ranch, they came into contact with Billy Thompson. Ben Thompson was notified of his brother's arrest, and immediately sought an attorney to represent him. Ben Thompson also notified Aransas County, in the hopes that they would extradite him to stand trial for that murder, rather than being sent to Kansas.

A number of Ben Thompson's allies boarded a train in Corsicana, Texas, and word of this was passed to Ranger Sparks. By this time, Ranger Sparks was feeling that an attempt would be made to free his prisoner by friends of Ben Thompson, so while in Dallas County, Texas, he requested additional guards from the county sheriff, and received several. With this overwhelming show of force, all rescue attempts to keep Billy Thompson out of Kansas were thwarted. Initially, the town of Ellsworth sought to have Billy jailed in Salina, Kansas, feeling the jail there was more secure. However, with several more Thompson partisans showing up in town, the decision was made instead to house him at Leavenworth.

== Trial and release ==
Ben Thompson hired local Kansas attorney Robert Gill to represent Billy. He later added Captain J. D. Mohler, Phillip T. Pendelton, and A. H. Case to the legal team. Court convened on September 3, 1874, with Judge John Prescott presiding. The prosecution had over a dozen witnesses to the shooting, while the defense had only six, one of whom was from Texas, with the other five being from Kansas. As it turned out, the defense witness William Purdy, from Atchison County, Kansas, emerged as the most dependable witness presented.

Purdy, standing nearby, was an eyewitness to the shooting, and heard clearly everything said by all those involved. His testimony was;

"Billy was standing still or trying to do so, as he was intoxicated. He had his eyes fixed on the party advancing on Ben and him. The shot of Ben did not stop them and they continued the same as before, and when being within about 20 feet of Billy Thompson, his gun being down below his breast, it went off, one barrel of it only, and the shot took effect on the shoulder and side of Whitney. Billy's gun was cocked, he did not bring the gun up, took no aim, nor was he looking at Whitney, who stood at his left. As the gun discharged, Ben said, 'My God Billy you have shot your best friend', Billy replied, 'I'm sorry', Whitney said, 'He did not intend to do it, it was an accident, send for my family'. There was no indication at any time that Whitney and the Thompson's weren't on the best of terms."

Others also testified of Whitney's statement after being shot, with the only difference being that some said he stated, "send for my wife and child" rather than "for my family". The prosecution objected many times, claiming certain things were "irrelevant" or hearsay, but they did not object to Whitney's dying declaration. A rumor that Billy Thompson stated after the shooting, "I'd have shot him if he were Jesus Christ", rather than "I'm sorry", was never mentioned, nor did it ever happen.

In a trial that lasted nine days, Billy Thompson was acquitted. Although that case was proven to have been accidental, amazingly, he was not held to be extradited to Aransas County, Texas, for the clear-cut murder of Remus Smith, but instead was released. For the next three years, his whereabouts were mostly rumors, but he is known to have arrived in Dodge City, Kansas, in May 1878. He is known to have been arrested by lawman Mart Duggan in Leadville, Colorado, in December 1879, for disturbing the peace, serving only one night in jail. Aransas County, in the meantime, continued its pursuit of him.

== Another shooting ==
On June 21, 1880, Billy Thompson was in Ogallala, Nebraska. A saloon owner named Bill Tucker and he had developed strong resentment for one another, supposedly over the affections of a prostitute named "Big Alice". Billy Thompson, drunk, stood in front of the saloon and fired two shots inside. The second of the shots hit Tucker in the hand, taking off one finger and mutilating others. Enraged, Tucker grabbed a shotgun and ran after the now-fleeing Billy. Tucker fired two shots, missing, reloaded and fired two more, this time riddling Billy Thompson in the back, from his heels to his neck. Billy Thompson was arrested, but allowed to remain under guard at the Ogallala House Hotel to heal. Knowing his brother Ben's reputation, the local sheriff ordered a heavy guard.

Ben Thompson, hearing of his brother's arrest, felt his intervening would result in bloodshed. Instead, he asked his friend Bat Masterson to travel to Ogllala to see if he could assist. Masterson did so, first meeting with Billy, then meeting with the ailing Tucker, who was bitter, but willing to drop charges, for a price. Unfortunately, Ben Thompson did not have access to the amount Tucker wanted, so Bat Masterson eluded the guards and helped Billy escape, with them taking a train south. After the escape, a Keith County, Nebraska, grand jury indicted Billy for assault with intent to kill. Those charges were eventually dropped, and the matter forgotten.

== Arrest and trial for Smith murder ==
On October 23, 1882, Texas Ranger Captain George W. Baylor captured Billy for the Remus Smith murder in El Paso, Texas, and turned him over to the El Paso County Sheriff, where he was remanded to the custody of Deputy Frank Manning to be returned to Rockport. Foolishly, Deputy Manning allowed Billy Thompson a night of freedom before his return, on the pretense he would return the next morning. He did not. On May 10, 1883, Aransas County Deputy P.P. Court captured Thompson in Arkansas, and finally he was returned to stand trial for the Smith murder.

However, it had been 15 years since the murder. Witnesses were sparse, and facts distorted due to poor records, with all of the lawmen who were serving at the time having long since moved on. The trial took only one day, with Thompson being acquitted. This was the one killing committed by Billy Thompson that should have been an iron-clad case of murder, but due to the many years that had passed, the prosecution could not prove their case. The case against him for the murder of soldier William Burke had never been pressed, with the general feeling that it was self defense. For the first time since his first killing, Billy Thompson was not wanted by the law for anything.

== Later life ==
On March 11, 1884, his older brother Ben Thompson was killed in San Antonio, Texas, in what became referred to as the Vaudeville Theater Ambush. For a time, newspapers speculated that Billy Thompson would seek revenge for his brother's death, but he never did. He roamed for a number of years, making his living as a gambler, and is believed to have never held any other employment, passing through Cripple Creek, Colorado, and often spending long periods in Houston and Galveston, Texas.

He died of a stomach ailment in Houston, on September 6, 1897. At the time of his death, Billy Thompson had killed four men, and wounded a fifth, with one killing being the shooting of the unarmed Remus Smith, another the accidental shooting of Sheriff Chauncey Whitney, and the other two killings and one wounding being during gunfights.

== Marriage to Squirrel Tooth Alice ==
While living in Abilene, Kansas, Billy Thompson met Mary Elizabeth Haley, better known as “Squirrel Tooth Alice.” In 1870, the couple left Kansas for Texas and for the next couple of years Billy punched cows along the Chisholm Trail while Haley continued working as a dance hall girl in various towns across the southern prairie.

In 1872, at the age of seventeen, Haley was plying her trade in the cattle town of Ellsworth, Kansas, while Billy worked the gambling halls. By the spring of 1873, however, the couple was back out on the prairie with a spring cattle drive. Haley bore her first child on the open prairie and, to make the child legitimate, she and Billy got married that year.

In the summer of 1873, after he killed Ellsworth town sheriff Chauncey Whitney, Billy took Libby and relocated to Dodge City. It was here that the Thompsons made the acquaintance of Wyatt Earp and his paramour, Mattie Blaylock.

After Dodge City, the Thompsons drifted to Colorado, but by 1876, they had moved to Sweetwater, Texas, which became their permanent home. In Sweetwater, the couple purchased a ranch outside of town and a dance hall in town. Mary ran the dance hall which was a front for a brothel. She was not embarrassed by her profession, and it was as a madam in Sweetwater that she became known for keeping her pet prairie dogs. These, along with a gap in her teeth, gave her the sobriquet, "Squirrel Tooth Alice." Billy and Libby Thompson would go on to have 9 to 13 children prior to Billy's death in 1897. Libby passed away from natural causes on April 13, 1953, having outlived her husband by over 50 years.
