= Demetrius Newton =

American politician (1928–2013)

Member of the Alabama House of Representatives from the 53rd district
- In office 1987 – September 11, 2013
- Succeeded by: Alann Johnson

Speaker pro tempore of the Alabama House
- In office 1998–2010
- Succeeded by: Victor Gaston

Personal details
- Born: March 15, 1928 Fairfield, Alabama, U.S.
- Died: September 11, 2013 (aged 85)
- Party: Democratic
- Education: Wilberforce University; Boston University School of Law

Military service
- Allegiance: United States Army
- Branch/service: 325th Regiment of the 82nd Airborne Division
- Years of service: 1952-1954
- Rank: Private First Class

Demetrius Caiphus Newton (March 15, 1928 – September 11, 2013) was an American civil rights attorney and politician. He filed lawsuits to end segregation, and represented Martin Luther King Jr., Rosa Parks, and others in cases related to civil rights. He then served in the Alabama House of Representatives, representing the 53rd district, from 1986 to his death in 2013. He became the first Black speaker pro tempore in the history of the Alabama House, serving in the role from 1998 through 2010.

== Early life ==
Newton was born in Fairfield, Alabama. He graduated from Fairfield Industrial High School. He received his Bachelor of Arts degree from Wilberforce University and his Juris Doctor from the Boston University School of Law in 1952. The state of Alabama paid Newton to attend a law school outside of the state, in order to prevent having to desegregate the University of Alabama School of Law or create a law school for Blacks. At Boston University, Newton met Martin Luther King Jr., who was enrolled as a seminary student at the time.

After he graduated from law school, Newton served in the United States Army's 325th Infantry Regiment of the 82nd Airborne Division from 1952 to September 1954 during the Korean War era. He was a private first class and worked as a defense councilor in the judge advocate section.

== Career ==
Upon completion of his tour in the army, he moved to Birmingham, Alabama. He set up a general practice law office where he worked as a civil rights attorney. He became a member of the Alabama Christian Movement for Human Rights and filed numerous lawsuits that were aimed at defeating segregationist laws. He represented King during the Selma to Montgomery marches. Newton also filed the first lawsuit under Title VII of the Civil Rights Act of 1964. He also worked on Rosa Parks' defense following her arrest for refusing to move from the "Whites Only" section of a bus.

Newtown ran for Fairfield City Council in 1956. Richard Arrington Jr., a childhood friend and the mayor of Birmingham, appointed Newton as the city attorney of Birmingham. He represented Blacks who were arrested during the Birmingham riot of 1963. From 1972 to 1978, he served as a judge in Brownville, Alabama. He was elected to the Alabama House of Representatives in 1986, and was elected as the speaker pro tempore in 1998, becoming the first Black speaker pro tempore in Alabama's history. He served in the role until 2010, when Republicans became the majority party. While a member of the Alabama House, Newton campaigned for a constitutional convention to replace the Constitution of Alabama, written in 1901, which he contended contains language that disenfranchises blacks and the poor.

Newton died following a long illness on September 11, 2013. After his death, Seth Hammett described Newton as "a gentleman and a scholar" while Robert J. Bentley called Newton a "fine gentleman", saying they "had a strong mutual respect for each other".
