= U.S. Johnson Map Project =

The U.S. Johnson Map Project (JMP) is a not-for-profit organization whose mission is to preserve the works of American publisher Alvin J. Johnson, including his atlases and books. The project reflects the work of Ira S. Lourie, who has studied the work of Johnson since 1985. The JMP offers the data collected by the project free to public on its website, JohnsonMapProject.org.

Johnson was a prolific publisher of atlases, and his “Johnson’s Family Atlas” was published from 1860 to 1887. Over the 27 years they were published, Johnson used 67 different maps of the United States and its individual states and the 658 variations of those maps in those atlases. The JMP has collected data on these 658 variations, which it presents on its website free of charge. This data is useful in identifying and dating loose Johnson atlas maps that have been removed from atlases. The website includes a “Map Identifier” capacity for this purpose. The website also has a gallery of Johnson's U.S. atlas maps which offers detailed images of each of the 67 maps, which were given to the JMP by The David Rumsey Map Collection.

In addition, the JMP has studied the availability of Johnson maps in the market place and has created a “Rarity Index” that dealers and collectors can use to better understand the value of their maps. The development of this “Rarity Index” was presented for review to the Washington Map Society and published in its journal along with a listing of the “rarity” of each of the 658 variations of Johnson's U.S. maps.

The JMP also has studied the biography of A.J. Johnson and his role in 19th-century map making. This history is published on the website and documents his role as a book publisher as well as map and atlas publisher.
