= Ellsworth, Kansas =

City in Ellsworth County, Kansas

- City and County seat
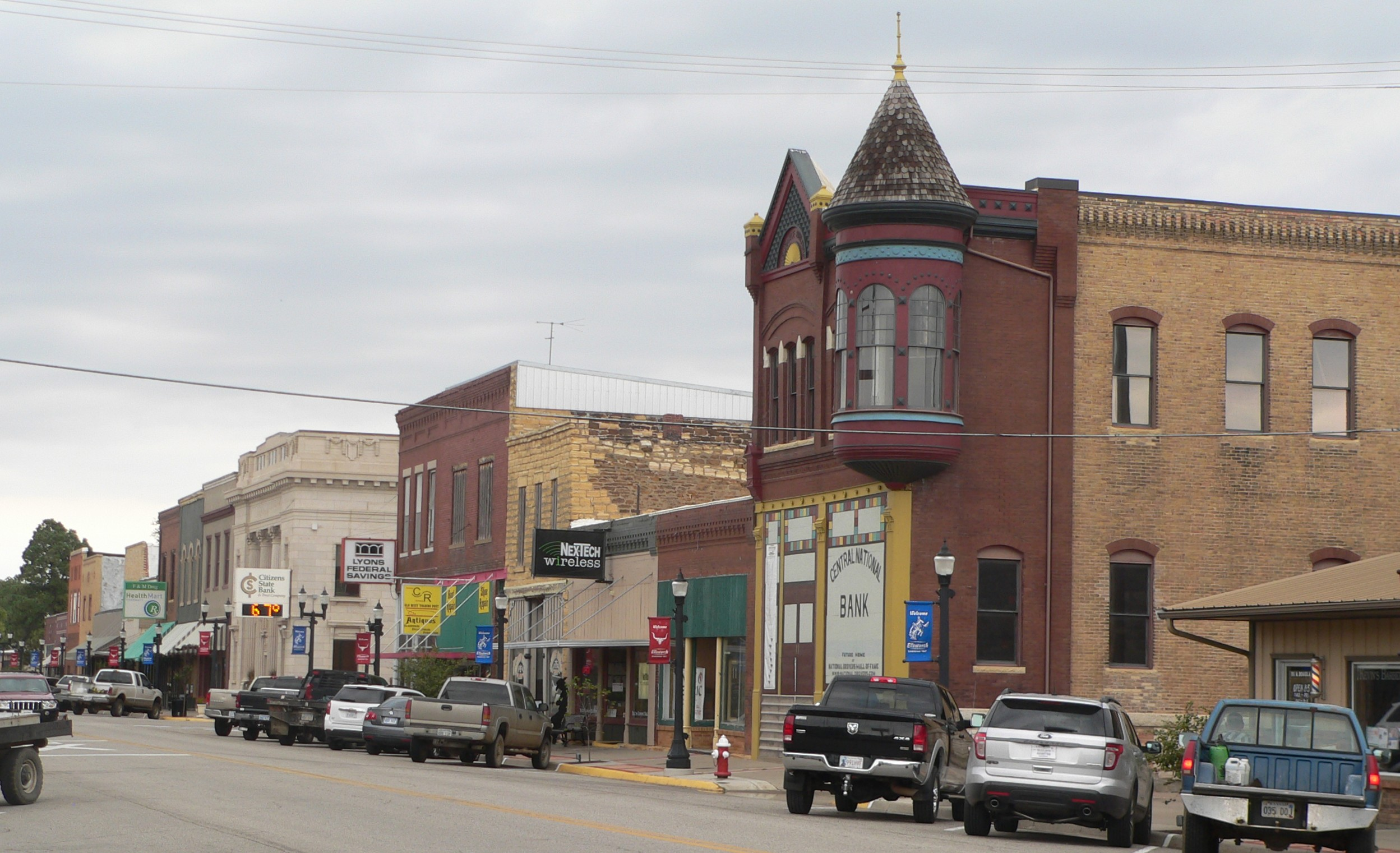
- Downtown Ellsworth (2014)

- Location within County and Kansas

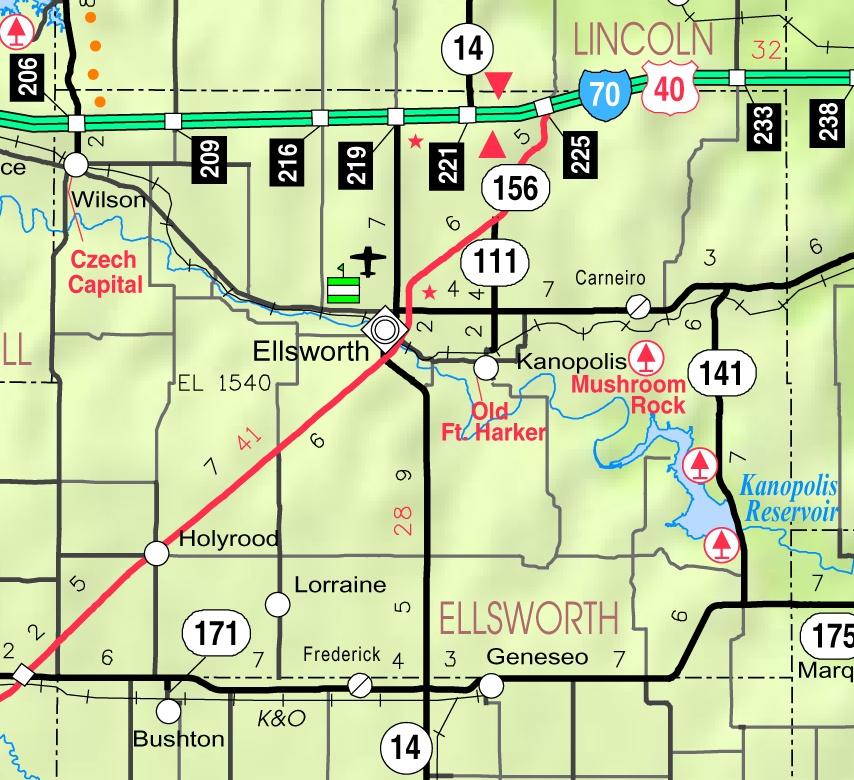
- KDOT map of Ellsworth County (legend)
- Coordinates: 38°43′58″N 98°13′43″W
- Country: United States
- State: Kansas
- County: Ellsworth
- Founded: 1860s
- Incorporated: 1867
- Named for: Fort Ellsworth

Government
  - Type: Mayor–Council
  - Mayor: Dan Finnegan

Area
  - Total: 2.39 sq mi (6.20 km^{2})
  - Land: 2.39 sq mi (6.20 km^{2})
  - Water: 0 sq mi (0.00 km^{2})
- Elevation: 1,545 ft (471 m)

Population (2020)
  - Total: 3,066
  - Density: 1,280/sq mi (495/km^{2})
- Time zone: UTC-6 (CST)
  - Summer (DST): UTC-5 (CDT)
- ZIP Code: 67439
- Area code: 785
- FIPS code: 20-20500
- GNIS ID: 485570
- Website: ellsworthks.net

Ellsworth is a city in and the county seat of Ellsworth County, Kansas, United States. As of the 2020 census, the population of the city was 3,066. Known as a cow town in the 1870s, when the Kansas Pacific Railroad operated a stockyard here for shipping cattle to eastern markets. In the 21st century, Ellsworth is the trading center of the rural county.

== History ==
=== 19th century ===
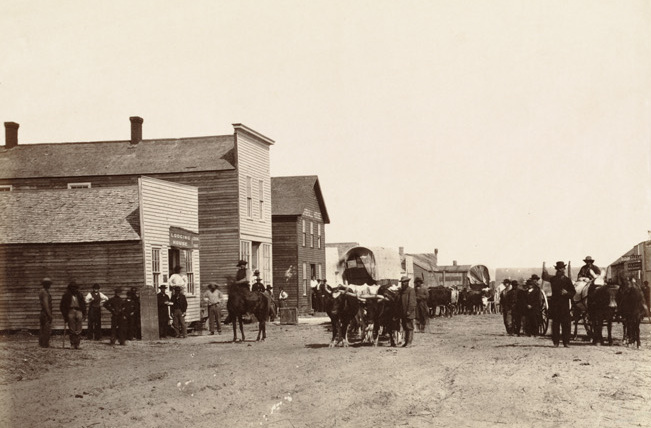
Ellsworth in 1867

Once called "The Wickedest Cattletown in Kansas", the city is named for Fort Ellsworth, which was built in 1864. Due to speculation on imminent railroad construction, the population of Ellsworth boomed to over two thousand by the time it was incorporated in 1867. It has since been said, "Abilene, the first, Dodge City, the last, but Ellsworth the wickedest".

Ellsworth was a bustling cattle town during the late 1860s, when the Kansas Pacific Railroad had a stop and stockyards there. Cattle were driven up from Texas to this point, and then shipped to major markets. Often cowboys had the run of the town. In 1875 Kansas Pacific closed its cattle pens, moving to another location. The cattle trade dwindled to almost nothing by the mid-1880s.

During the late 1860s into the 1870s, Ellsworth was known for being one of the "wickedest" cattle towns, the scene of numerous killings following shootouts between drunken cowboys. The town sported numerous saloons, brothels and gambling halls, with prostitution being rampant. Wild Bill Hickok ran for Ellsworth County Sheriff in 1868, but was defeated by veteran Union Army soldier E. W. Kingsbury. Kingsbury was an effective lawman, but relied on local marshals to patrol the town, as he also had to police the county. Violence in Ellsworth was commonplace among the cowboys and people associated with them. Ellsworth marshal Will Semans was shot and killed on September 26, 1869, while attempting to disarm a rowdy man in a dance hall.

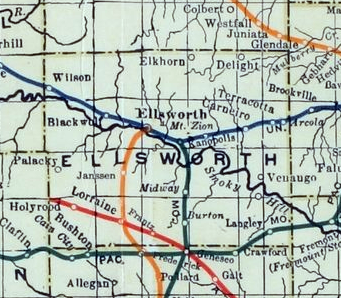
1915-1918 railroad map of Ellsworth County

For a time during this period, two small-time outlaws known only as Craig and Johnson began bullying people around the community, often committing armed robbery. After Semans' murder, they operated openly. Before long, citizens formed a vigilance squad and captured both men, hanging them in a lynching near the Smoky Hill River. Chauncey Whitney, a deputy to Kingsbury, took over following Sheriff Kingsbury's departure. Whitney quickly gained a reputation as being both tough and respectable, and was well liked. The scale of business is shown by construction of the Drovers Cottage in 1872. It could accommodate 175 guests, and stable 50 carriages and 100 horses.

Lawman Wyatt Earp claimed to have served in Ellsworth for a short time. He also later claimed to have arrested gunman Ben Thompson there. But Thompson was arrested by Deputy Ed Hogue after his brother Billy Thompson accidentally shot and killed Ellsworth County Sheriff Chauncey Whitney in 1873. Billy Thompson fled, fearing that he would be lynched for the death of the popular sheriff. Thompson was eventually captured and put on trial, but was acquitted in the shooting. Sheriff Whitney, a friend to both Thompsons, had told bystanders before his death that the shooting was an accident.

By the late 1870s the crime rate had dropped dramatically, as fewer cowboys came through after Kansas Pacific closed its stockyard here. Cattle drives were directed to other market cities, such as Dodge City. Ellsworth suffered economically.

In 1888, the Kansas Midland Railway Company built between Wichita and Ellsworth. The line was purchased in 1900 by the St. Louis-San Francisco Railway (the "Frisco"). The Frisco operated the line for many years, but it has since been abandoned.

=== 21st century ===
Ellsworth has been developing heritage tourism related to its unique 19th-century history. The city and activists have plans to restore Ellsworth's Signature Insurance Building for use as the National Drovers Hall of Fame. Funds for the project are being raised party from an annual cattle drive down Main Street and Douglas Avenue; it is one of the few in the United States that is historically accurate.

== Geography ==
Ellsworth lies on the north side of the Smoky Hill River in the Smoky Hills region of the Great Plains. Oak Creek, a tributary of the Smoky Hill, flows south past the eastern side of the city to its confluence with the river southeast of the city.

Ellsworth is located at the intersection of K-14, K-140, and K-156 in central Kansas roughly 27 miles (43 km) west-southwest of Salina, Kansas. Ellsworth is approximately 110 miles (180 km) northwest of Wichita and 212 miles (341 km) west-southwest of Kansas City. According to the United States Census Bureau, the city has a total area of 2.43 square miles (6.29 km^{2}), all land.

=== Climate ===
Under the Köppen climate classification, Ellsworth falls within either a hot-summer humid continental climate (Dfa) if the 0 °C (32 °F) isotherm is used or a humid subtropical climate (Cfa) if the −3 °C (27 °F) isotherm is used. Summers are hot and humid and winters are moderately cold with wide variations in temperature. The average annual temperature is 53.3 °F (11.8 °C), and the average yearly precipitation is 30.87 inches (78.4 cm). Snowfall averages 16.2 inches (41 cm) per year. On average, July is the warmest month, January is the coldest month and driest, and May is the wettest month. The hottest temperature recorded in was 117 °F (47.2 °C) on August 12–13, 1936, while the coldest temperature recorded was −30 °F (−34.4 °C) on January 8, 1913.

Climate data for Ellsworth, Kansas, 1991–2020 normals, extremes 1904–present
Month	Jan	Feb	Mar	Apr	May	Jun	Jul	Aug	Sep	Oct	Nov	Dec	Year
Record high °F (°C)	83 (28)	89 (32)	98 (37)	101 (38)	108 (42)	115 (46)	116 (47)	117 (47)	114 (46)	102 (39)	88 (31)	80 (27)	117 (47)
Mean maximum °F (°C)	65.9 (18.8)	70.6 (21.4)	80.5 (26.9)	87.8 (31.0)	92.2 (33.4)	99.0 (37.2)	104.0 (40.0)	102.2 (39.0)	96.9 (36.1)	89.8 (32.1)	76.9 (24.9)	65.1 (18.4)	105.2 (40.7)
Mean daily maximum °F (°C)	42.2 (5.7)	46.6 (8.1)	57.4 (14.1)	67.5 (19.7)	76.8 (24.9)	87.6 (30.9)	92.7 (33.7)	90.4 (32.4)	82.3 (27.9)	70.1 (21.2)	56.1 (13.4)	44.0 (6.7)	67.8 (19.9)
Daily mean °F (°C)	29.9 (−1.2)	33.5 (0.8)	43.5 (6.4)	53.3 (11.8)	64.2 (17.9)	75.0 (23.9)	80.0 (26.7)	77.6 (25.3)	69.1 (20.6)	56.0 (13.3)	42.7 (5.9)	32.1 (0.1)	54.7 (12.6)
Mean daily minimum °F (°C)	17.8 (−7.9)	20.3 (−6.5)	29.6 (−1.3)	39.1 (3.9)	51.6 (10.9)	62.5 (16.9)	67.4 (19.7)	64.9 (18.3)	55.9 (13.3)	41.9 (5.5)	29.4 (−1.4)	20.1 (−6.6)	41.7 (5.4)
Mean minimum °F (°C)	0.5 (−17.5)	2.9 (−16.2)	12.3 (−10.9)	23.3 (−4.8)	35.1 (1.7)	50.0 (10.0)	55.8 (13.2)	53.3 (11.8)	39.6 (4.2)	24.8 (−4.0)	12.8 (−10.7)	4.0 (−15.6)	−5.0 (−20.6)
Record low °F (°C)	−30 (−34)	−28 (−33)	−16 (−27)	7 (−14)	17 (−8)	40 (4)	43 (6)	40 (4)	24 (−4)	8 (−13)	−7 (−22)	−28 (−33)	−30 (−34)
Average precipitation inches (mm)	0.83 (21)	1.16 (29)	1.94 (49)	2.51 (64)	4.94 (125)	3.86 (98)	3.88 (99)	4.43 (113)	2.70 (69)	2.13 (54)	1.30 (33)	1.16 (29)	30.84 (783)
Average snowfall inches (cm)	3.8 (9.7)	4.7 (12)	1.3 (3.3)	0.4 (1.0)	0.0 (0.0)	0.0 (0.0)	0.0 (0.0)	0.0 (0.0)	0.0 (0.0)	0.4 (1.0)	1.2 (3.0)	4.4 (11)	16.2 (41)
Average precipitation days (≥ 0.01 in)	4.1	3.9	5.8	6.7	8.9	7.3	8.2	7.2	5.0	5.3	3.9	3.7	70.0
Average snowy days (≥ 0.1 in)	2.1	1.9	0.9	0.2	0.0	0.0	0.0	0.0	0.0	0.3	0.6	1.9	7.9
Source 1: NOAA
Source 2: National Weather Service

== Demographics ==
Historical population
Census	Pop.	Note	%±
1870	448		—
1880	929		107.4%
1890	1,620		74.4%
1900	1,549		−4.4%
1910	2,041		31.8%
1920	2,065		1.2%
1930	2,072		0.3%
1940	2,227		7.5%
1950	2,193		−1.5%
1960	2,361		7.7%
1970	2,080		−11.9%
1980	2,465		18.5%
1990	2,294		−6.9%
2000	2,965		29.3%
2010	3,120		5.2%
2020	3,066		−1.7%
U.S. Decennial Census

=== 2020 census ===
As of the 2020 census, Ellsworth had a population of 3,066 people, with 969 households and 551 families.

The population density was 1,281.2 per square mile (494.7/km^{2}). There were 1,144 housing units at an average density of 478.1 per square mile (184.6/km^{2}). Of the housing units, 15.3% were vacant; the homeowner vacancy rate was 3.8% and the rental vacancy rate was 15.3%.

Of the 969 households, 24.1% had children under the age of 18 living in them. Of all households, 44.6% were married-couple households, 21.9% were households with a male householder and no spouse or partner present, and 29.0% were households with a female householder and no spouse or partner present. About 39.4% of households were made up of individuals, and 19.0% had someone living alone who was 65 years of age or older. The average household size was 2.2 and the average family size was 2.7.

The median age was 40.0 years. 16.0% of residents were under the age of 18, 6.8% were ages 18 to 24, 34.1% were ages 25 to 44, 25.5% were ages 45 to 64, and 17.6% were age 65 or older. For every 100 females, there were 173.3 males; for every 100 females age 18 and over, there were 191.7 males.

0.0% of residents lived in urban areas, while 100.0% lived in rural areas.

Racial composition as of the 2020 census
Race	Number	Percent
White	2,580	84.1%
Black or African American	244	8.0%
American Indian and Alaska Native	39	1.3%
Asian	15	0.5%
Native Hawaiian and Other Pacific Islander	0	0.0%
Some other race	25	0.8%
Two or more races	163	5.3%
Hispanic or Latino (of any race)	221	7.2%

Demographic estimates

The percent of those with a bachelor's degree or higher was estimated to be 12.6% of the population.

Income and poverty

The 2016–2020 5-year American Community Survey estimates show that the median household income was $53,547 (with a margin of error of +/- $5,733) and the median family income was $76,125 (+/- $23,135). Males had a median income of $27,146 (+/- $5,757) versus $32,944 (+/- $5,231) for females. The median income for those above 16 years old was $30,033 (+/- $4,968). Approximately, 3.0% of families and 6.8% of the population were below the poverty line, including 10.2% of those under the age of 18 and 4.5% of those ages 65 or over.

=== 2010 census ===
As of the census of 2010, there were 3,120 people, 997 households, and 639 families living in the city. The population density was 1,284.0 inhabitants per square mile (495.8/km^{2}). There were 1,154 housing units at an average density of 474.9 per square mile (183.4/km^{2}). The racial makeup of the city was 87.9% White, 9.3% African American, 0.6% Native American, 0.4% Asian, 0.7% from other races, and 1.1% from two or more races. Hispanic or Latino of any race were 6.2% of the population.

There were 997 households, of which 26.7% had children under the age of 18 living with them, 51.6% were married couples living together, 9.2% had a female householder with no husband present, 3.3% had a male householder with no wife present, and 35.9% were non-families. 32.7% of all households were made up of individuals, and 12.9% had someone living alone who was 65 years of age or older. The average household size was 2.21 and the average family size was 2.77.

The median age in the city was 38.4 years. 17% of residents were under the age of 18; 10.5% were between the ages of 18 and 24; 31.5% were from 25 to 44; 25% were from 45 to 64; and 16.1% were 65 years of age or older. The gender makeup of the city was 61.9% male and 38.1% female.

== Economy ==
A Great Plains Manufacturing Ellsworth Tillage Implement Plant, a manufacturing facility, is located in Ellsworth.

== Government ==
The Ellsworth government consists of an elected mayor and five council members, who are also elected. The council meets the 2nd and 4th Monday of each month at 5:30PM.

- City Hall, 121 W First St.

== Education ==
The community is served by Ellsworth USD 327 public school district. The district high school, Ellsworth Jr/Sr High School, is in Ellsworth. Bearcats are the Ellsworth High School mascot.

== Media ==
Ellsworth has a weekly newspaper, the Ellsworth County Independent/Reporter.

K243AR, a translator of radio station KRSL in Russell, Kansas, broadcasts from Ellsworth on 96.5 FM playing a Christian format.

== Infrastructure ==
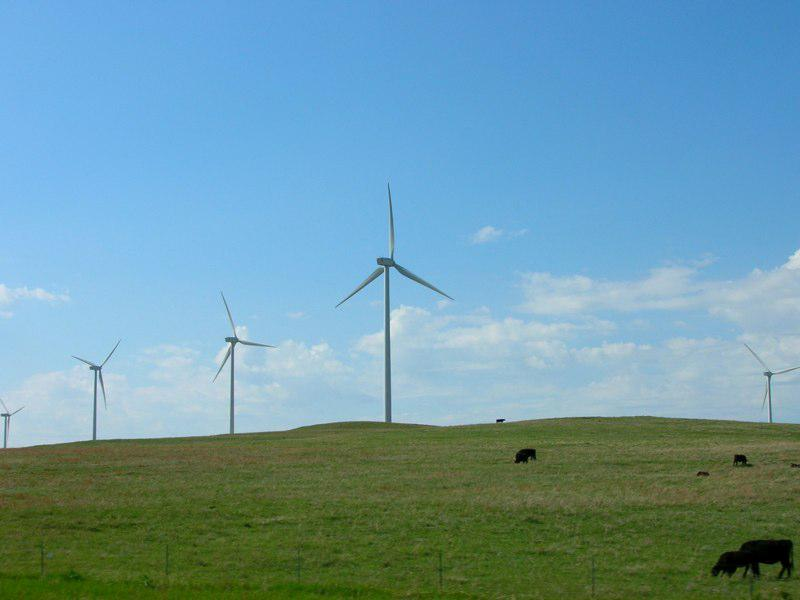
Smoky Hill Wind Farm near Ellsworth

In 2008, TradeWind Energy and Enel North America made Ellsworth and Lincoln counties home to the Smoky Hills Wind Farm. Its 155 wind turbines have a total capacity of 250MW and are installed on approximately 20,000 acres of agricultural land. Some 100 landowners have lease arrangements to have the Smoky Hills Wind Farm's turbines installed on their properties. The wind farm generates enough power to satisfy energy consumption requirements of 85,000 homes.

The Post Rock Wind Farm is a 200 MW wind power facility in Kansas, reaching across Ellsworth and Lincoln counties. Post Rock Wind consists of 134 three-bladed 1.5 MW GE wind turbines. Pattern Energy owns 60% of the project, equal to 120 MW. The facility, which reached commercial operation in October 2012, sells 100% of its electrical output under a long-term power purchase agreement with Westar, which has a BBB+ credit rating. Post Rock Wind facility spreads across an area of 23,000 acres in Ellsworth and Lincoln counties of Kansas

== Notable people ==
- Keith Ackerman, Episcopal bishop
- Susan Clough, Secretary to President Jimmy Carter
- Kaden Davis, NFL player
- Kelvin Droegemeier, professor and research meteorologist, Director of the White House Office of Science and Technology Policy and Science Advisor to the President
- Wyatt Earp, lawman
- Alfred Johnson (born 1935) archaeologist at the University of Kansas.
- Robert Mize Jr., Anglican bishop
- John Morco, gunfighter
- Ben Thompson, gunfighter
- Billy Thompson, gunfighter
- Libby Thompson, prostitute
- R. Stephen White, physicist

== See also ==
- Kanopolis Drive-in Theatre
- Mushroom Rock State Park
