= Wilbur Lee Jennings =

Convicted American serial killer

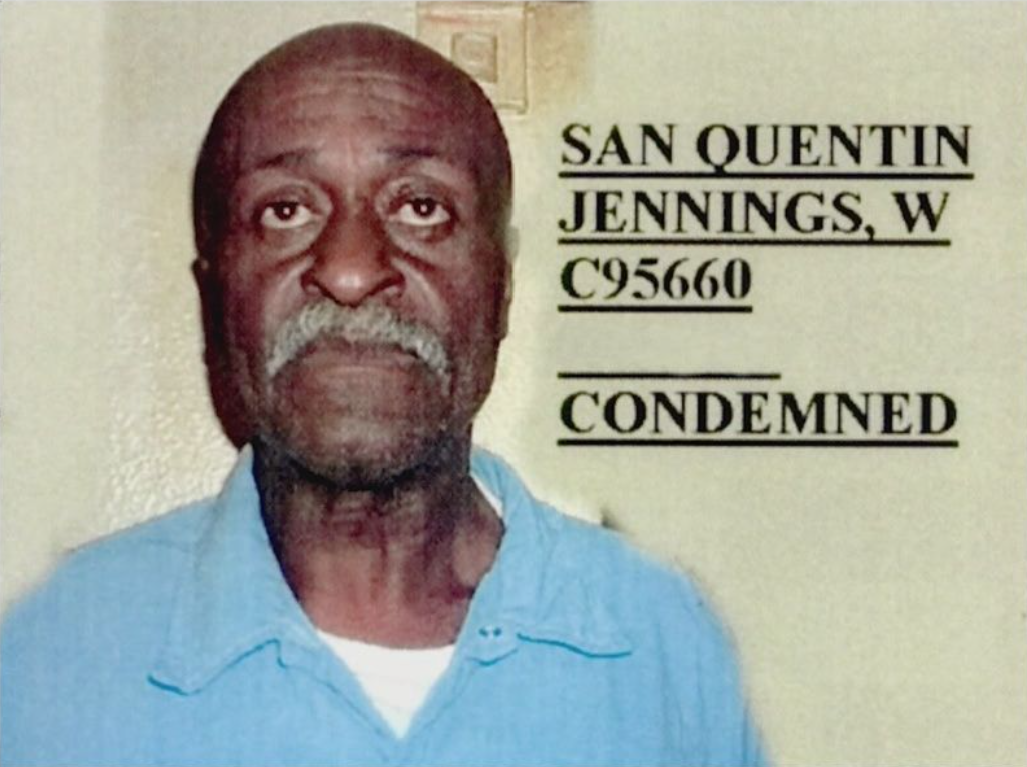
- Inmate mugshot
- Born: February 28, 1940; Shreveport, Louisiana, U.S.
- Died: February 11, 2014 (aged 73); Sacramento County Jail, Sacramento, California, U.S.
- Other name: "The Ditchbank Murderer"
- Convictions: First degree murder with special circumstances (3 counts); Second degree murder (1 count); Rape (4 counts); Assault (1 count)
- Penalty: Death

Details
- Victims: 6+ (4 convictions)
- Span of crimes: 1981–1984
- Country: United States
- State: California
- Date apprehended: September 13, 1984

Wilbur Lee Jennings (1940 – February 11, 2014), known as The Ditchbank Murderer, was an American serial killer who killed at least six girls and women in Fresno and Sacramento, California between 1981 and 1984. On November 20, 1986, he was sentenced to death, but died in custody before he could be executed.

== Trial ==
Jennings's trial for four of the then believed only five victims began in 1986. The main evidentiary basis for the prosecution's case were the numerous objects identified by victims' family members, chiefly the baseball bat and pipe with blood stains on them, which, according to investigators, were the likely murder weapons. Aside from that, there was testimony from Jennings' relatives, friends, and acquaintances, in addition to that from the murdered girls' friends as well.

Wilbur himself maintained his innocence throughout the whole process, accusing the prosecutor of putting pressure on witnesses and forcing them to give false testimony.

However, despite his efforts, on November 20, Jennings was found guilty on all charges, and was promptly sentenced to death. The victims in which Jennings was convicted of killing were Linda Johnson in September 1984, Olga Cannon in August 1984, Jacqueline Frazier in July 1984 and Karen Robinson in August 1983. He was convicted of second degree murder for Robinson's death and first degree murder for the other victims.

== Death ==
After his conviction, Jennings was transferred to the death row in San Quentin State Prison, where he spent the subsequent years of his life. In October 2005, following the results of a DNA examination, Jennings was linked to the murder of 76-year-old Clarice Reinke, who had been raped and killed in Fresno in June 1983, as well as that of 17-year-old Debra Chandler, who had been raped and murdered in July 1981. Chandler's body, as with Jennings' other victims, had been found in an irrigation ditch outside Fresno. In the Reinke case, authorities found a peculiarity: aside from Wilbur's biological traces, they also found DNA belonging to another man. After further inquiries, it was linked to 64-year-old Alvin Johnson, who was serving a prison sentence for a rape-murder committed in Utah. New charges were brought against Jennings, but he refused to admit his guilt in either of the cases, claiming that the results had been falsified. By that time, he was having health problems, as he had been diagnosed with prostate cancer and diabetes, as a result of which his trial for the murders of Reinke and Chandler was postponed several times.

Ultimately, the criminal case for Chandler began in late 2013, leading Wilbur Jennings to be transferred out of San Quentin State Prison to the Sacramento County Jail, where he died on February 11, 2014, aged 73, due to complications from his diseases.

== See also ==
- Alvin Johnson
- List of serial killers in the United States
