= Alfred E. Johnson =

American archeologist (born 1935) studied North American Plains

- Born: August 19, 1935 (age 91); Ellsworth, Kansas
- Education: University of Kansas BA, University of Arizona MA & PhD
- Occupations: Archeologist, anthropologist
- Known for: North American Plains, Southwest, Archaeology, paleoecology, systematics,

Alfred Edwin Johnson Jr. (born August 19, 1935) is an anthropologist and archaeologist at the University of Kansas. He specialized in the North American Plains and the Pueblo Indian culture.

== Early life and education ==
Johnson was born in Ellsworth, Kansas, August 19, 1935 to Alfred E. Johnson Sr. and Ruth Sarah Johnson (Oliver) both of Kansas.

He received his B.A. in anthropology from the University of Kansas and his M.A. and Ph.D. in anthropology from the University of Arizona. His dissertation research focused on Pueblo Indian culture.

== Career ==
Johnson joined the faculty of the University of Kansas in 1965.

=== Books ===
- Johnson, Alfred E. (editor & author), (1980). (first edition). Archaic Prehistory on the Prairie-Plains Border. University Of Kansas. ISBN 978-0938332107.
- Wasley, William W. and Alfred E. Johnson (1965). Salvage Archaeology in Painted Rocks Reservoir Western Arizona. Anthropological Papers of the University of Arizona, Number 9.. University of Arizona.

== Personal life ==
Johnson married fellow University of Arizona graduate student, Alice Ann Stofer in 1957 in Tucson, Arizona.
