= Enel North America =

American company headquartered in Andover, MA, United States

- Industry: Electric utility
- Founded: 2000; 26 years ago
- Founder: Enel
- Headquarters: Andover, Massachusetts, United States
- Area served: United States, Canada
- Key people: Enrico Viale (CEO, president
- Products: Electricity generation and distribution; demand response; energy storage systems; natural gas distribution
- Owner: Enel S.p.A.
- Number of employees: 1,800+ (2022)
- Website: enelnorthamerica.com

Enel North America is an American company headquartered in Andover, MA, United States. One of the renewable energy operators in North America, it was formed as a subsidiary of the global utility Enel S.p.A. in 2000. It has operations in the United States and Canada through its renewables and energy services businesses, with a portfolio including over 9.6 GW of renewable capacity, 160,000 EV charging stations, 4.7 GW of demand response capacity and 14 utility-scale battery energy storage systems, totaling 1,416 MWh of capacity under construction or in operation. It serves a customer base of over 4,500 businesses, utilities, and cities in North America.

== History ==
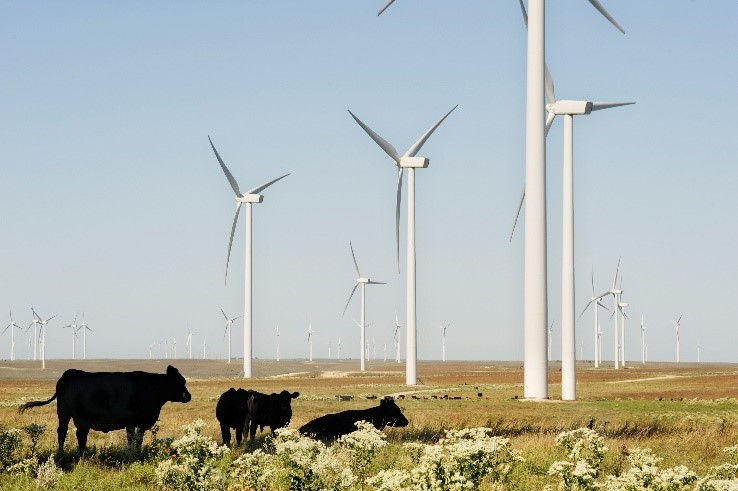
The Smoky Hills wind farm in Kansas

=== 2000–2015: Establishment in North America and Renewable Energy Growth ===
In December 2000, Enel Group entered the US market and acquired the American renewable energy producer CHI Energy, taking over a portfolio of 254 MW of hydro energy In 2003, CHI Energy officially changed its name to Enel North America Inc.

With the creation of Enel Green Power – the business line founded in 2008 and dedicated to developing, building, operating and selling renewable energy – the company expanded its portfolio in North America to 570 MW, including biomass, wind and geothermal energy. Also in 2008, Enel Green Power announced the launching of its first wind and solar projects in the United States, namely the Snyder wind farm in Texas, the Minnesota Wind farm in Minnesota, the Smoky Hills wind farm in Kansas, and the Sheldon Springs solar farm in Vermont.

In 2010, the Group extended its presence in North America with its first renewable energy project in Canada. As of today, it operates three wind facilities based in Alberta, with a total clean energy capacity of 210 MW.

=== 2015–2017: Hybrid Plant Innovation and PPAs ===
In 2015, Enel developed Stillwater, the first hybrid plant in the world to combine geothermal, solar photovoltaic and solar thermal energy. Located in Churchill County, Nevada, it consists of a 33 MW geothermal plant, a 26 MWdc photovoltaic solar plant, a 27 MWdc photovoltaic solar plant, and a 2 MW solar thermal plant. Stillwater combines the continuous generating capacity of medium enthalpy, binary cycle geothermal power with solar photovoltaic and solar thermal sources.

In 2016, with the completion of Kansas's 400 MW Cimarron Bend wind farm, Enel Green Power reached 3 GW of renewable capacity across North America. 2016 was also the year of Enel Green Power's first power purchase agreement (PPA), which was signed with Google with the entry into service of the first 200 MW of the facility. A second 200-MW PPA was signed with the Kansas City Board of Public Utilities (BPU), which is a not-for-profit public utility. In 2016, Enel North America also started the Cove Fort hybrid plant in Utah, the world's first large scale power generation facility combining geothermal and hydropower technologies.

=== 2017–2019: Expansion into Advanced Energy Services and Electric Vehicle Infrastructure ===
In 2017, Enel inaugurated its new North American headquarters in Andover, Massachusetts. The headquarters’ construction and design included a carpet made from recycled materials, electric vehicle charging stations, low-flow water fixtures, LED lighting, and a recycling and composting program. Also in 2017, the company opened a trading business line now known as Energy and Commodity Management. In the same year, Enel acquired Demand Energy Networks (a developer and operator of energy storage systems and software), eMotorWerks (a company operating a network of electric vehicle charging ports and supplies, charging stations known as JuiceBox) and EnerNOC (a demand response provider and a player in energy software). In October 2018, these companies were integrated as Enel X, Enel's business line dedicated to the development of products and digital solutions for cities, homes, industries, and electric mobility.

In 2018, the American Wind Energy Association named Enel Green Power as the fastest-growing wind operator. The company also signed clean energy contracts with large corporations including Anheuser-Busch, Kohler, Facebook, Adobe, Starbucks, Bloomberg LP, and General Motors. In the same year, it announced the deployment of a 1-MWh lithium-ion battery storage system in Canada for Ontario-based retail apple orchard Algoma Orchards.

In 2019, Enel Green Power completed the acquisition of Tradewind Energy – a US greenfield renewables developer – adding a 7 GW pipeline of wind, solar and storage facilities. Also in 2019, Anheuser Busch aired a Super Bowl ad describing the company's commitment to brew all Budweiser products in the US with wind energy, a result of a power purchase agreement with Enel. Enel also opened a new Innovation Hub in Boston at Greentown Labs, the largest cleantech startup incubator in the US.

=== 2019–present: Reorganizing as Enel North America ===
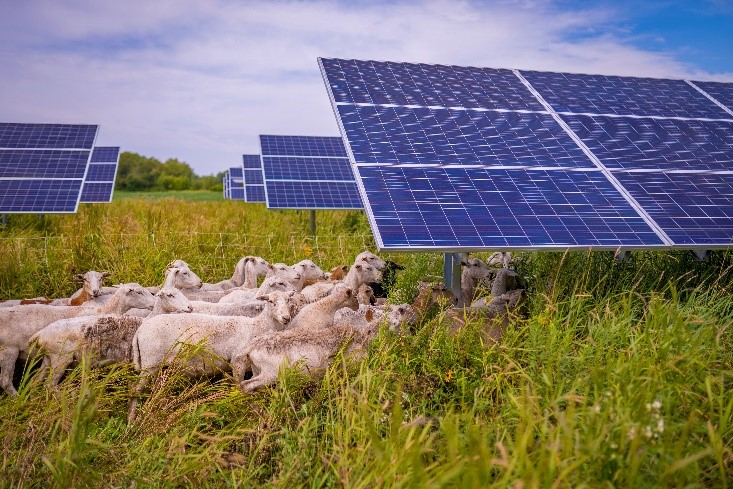
Enel North America's solar farm in Minnesota

After several years operating only through separate business lines – Enel Green Power North America and Enel X North America – the company reconstituted Enel North America, Inc. as a parent entity in 2019. In the same year, Enel became the official energy partner of Gillette Stadium.

In 2020, Enel X partnered with UMass Boston, to develop a 1 MW solar photovoltaic system, a 500 kW/2MWh lithium-ion battery storage system, and 11 Enel X JuiceBox electric vehicle (EV) smart charging stations on the campus. Also in 2020, Enel X delivered resources to the grid at more than 500 demand response events. With new EV smart charging solutions and more than 40 utility smart charging partners, it reached over 60,000 residential and commercial smart charging stations in North America. Furthermore, in 2020, the Cimarron Bend wind farm in Kansas was expanded by 199 MW, raising a total capacity of 599 MW. Enel Green Power also announced the start of construction of the Lily solar + storage project, which subsequently began operations in December 2021. Located east of Dallas, Texas, it is Enel Green Power's first hybrid project in North America integrating renewable energy with utility-scale battery storage, combining 181 MW of solar PV with 55MWdc of battery energy storage.

In 2022, Enel Group announced the launch of Enel X Way, its new global business line dedicated to smart electric vehicle infrastructure solutions. In North America, Enel X Way is headquartered in San Carlos, California, with the aim of supporting the demand for electric vehicles and smart EV charging infrastructures. In the same year, Enel X Way's home charging station, the JuiceBox, was named the "best EV charger overall" by CNET Roadshow. Moreover, Enel X Way and Tritium signed a global framework agreement and first contract in the U.S., with more than 250 fast charging stations ordered by Enel X Way for use in the U.S. Also, Enel Group launched Gridspertise in U.S. market: the company is dedicated to accelerating the digital transformation of power grids. In 2022, Enel North America launched its retail energy business to sell electricity directly to US businesses, backed by the output of Enel's renewable generation assets. In the same year, Enel announced plans to build a solar factory to produce solar modules and cells in the U.S., with initial planned production of 3 gigawatts—and ultimately as much as 6 gigawatts—of solar panels.

== Operations and business areas ==
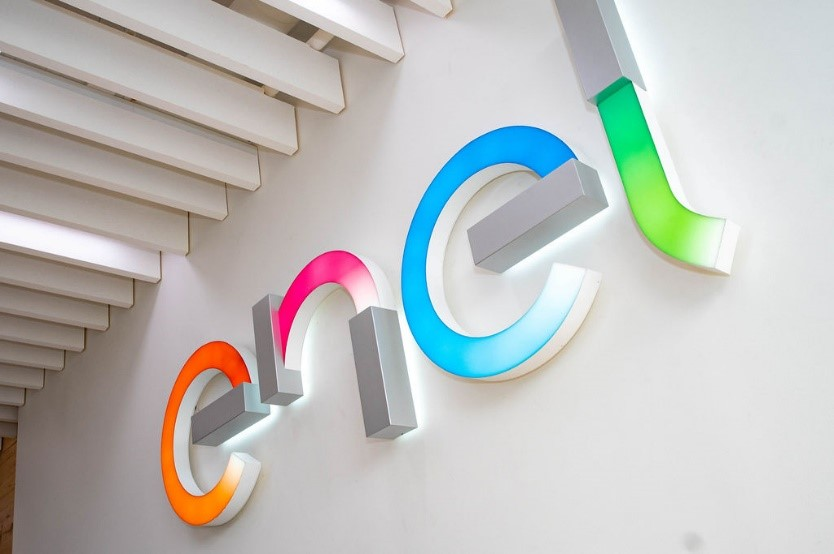
Enel North America's headquarters in Andover

Enel North America provides businesses, utilities, municipalities, and other commercial energy users with energy solutions, including renewable power generation, demand response, distributed energy resources, electric vehicle charging, energy trading, advisory and consulting services. In the United States and Canada, it has operations through its renewables, advanced energy services, and Energy & Commodity Management divisions.

Enel North America's renewables business is specialized in the development, long-term owning and operation of renewable energy plants. In the U.S. & Canada, it operates 64 renewable energy power plants – including wind, solar, and geothermal power – for a total capacity of over 9.6 GW. It is present in 14 U.S. states and 1 Canadian province. It produced 18 TWh in 2021, enough energy to power 1.6 million households/year.

Enel North America's advanced energy services business is dedicated to the development of products and digital solutions for cities, homes, and industries. Enel X manages 4.7 GW of demand response capacity across utilities and businesses, with more than 70 behind-the-meter battery energy storage systems in operation or under contract. Though the Enel X division, Enel North America manages over $10.5 billion in customers’ annual energy spend for about 4,500 business customers, spanning more than 35,000 sites.

Enel North America's Energy & Commodity Management division acts as an interface with the wholesale energy markets. It manages the integrated gross energy margin and dispatches the local generation fleet. The division is active in import/export activities and manages more than 7.6 GW, including wind and solar power. It operates in all power ISO markets and in Canada, with its main traded products including power, gas, Renewable Energy Credits (RECs), and weather. The division also provides energy management services and tailor-made products (e.g., PPA) to third parties.

== Presence in the United States and Canada ==
Enel North America's EV charging unit served commercial and residential customers across the U.S. and Canada until October 2024, when it announced that it would end North American product support on Friday, October 11. The residential chargers will continue to work, but customers will lose features like app access to check charging status and history, and to schedule charging. Commercial chargers, however, "will lose functionality in the absence of software continuity". The company cited slow EV market growth and high interest rates as reasons for its exit. The Linux Foundation's LF Energy project used the incident to make the case for using vendor-agnostic open source code in EV charging infrastructure to prevent such stranded assets.

Just days before the end of Enel X server access, the EV charging community mobilized to discuss possible solutions. Various highly regarded YouTube EV channels (Transport Evolved, State of Charge) assembled panels of charging hardware and software experts to assess the situation and make plans, including contacting several state attorneys general. Consumer Reports, U.S. PIRG and charger owners submitted a petition to the Federal Trade Commission (FTC) protesting the abrupt end of sales and support. An ad-hoc group called Juice Rescue launched a website to help gather and share information about the transition away from Enel X chargers. A day before the planned end date, Enel X announced that it would delay the shutdown deadline "for an extended period" and find a third party to support its user base.

=== Oklahoma ===
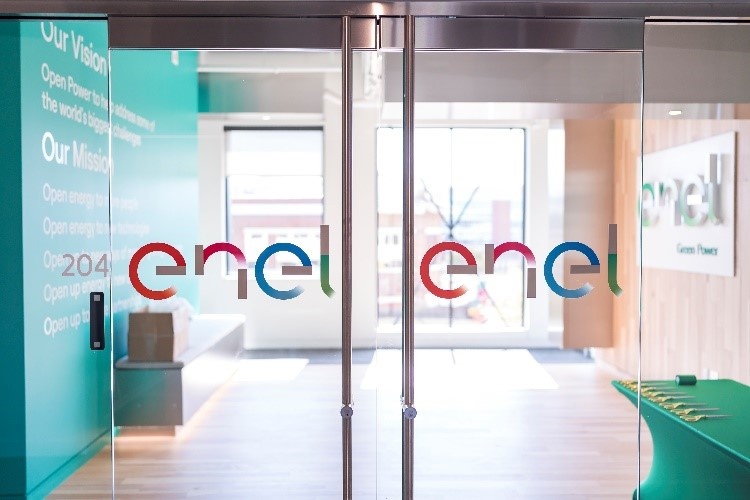
Enel North America's Oklahoma City office

Enel North America started generating energy from wind sources in Oklahoma through Enel Green Power in 2012, with the first wind farm being Rocky Ridge. Since then, the company has built or started construction of 13 wind farms in Oklahoma, representing over 2 GW of operating capacity.

Its Origin wind farm – a 150-megawatt plant located near Hennepin, Oklahoma – started operating in September 2015. Origin has 75 Vestas wind turbines and can power about 55,000 homes. It was the third Enel North America project to start production in Oklahoma since 2012.

In March 2022, Enel North America commenced construction of the 300-MW Seven Cowboy wind park, located in the Washita and Kiowa counties, Oklahoma. It is Enel North America's 13th wind farm in Oklahoma and is expected to be running by the end of 2022. Seven Cowboy will consist of 107 turbines capable of producing more than 1.3 TWh of electricity annually, enough to power over 120,000 U.S. households per year.

Furthermore, in September 2022, Enel North America signed an eight-year virtual power purchasing agreement with Thermo Fisher Scientific Inc. to deliver a 90 MW portion of the Seven Cowboy wind project.

In October 2022, Enel North America opened a new office and training space in midtown Oklahoma City, Oklahoma, including classrooms dealing with topics like safety, professional development, working at heights, ladder rescues, turbine repair and troubleshooting, as well as state-of-the-art simulation facilities for learning how to work inside wind turbines.

In December 2024, US District Judge Jennifer Choe-Groves of the U.S. Court of International Trade concludes 10 years of litigation between Enel and Osage Nation a federally recognized Indian tribe. The court order includes removal of 84 wind turbines from sovereign land due to Enel not getting the required permits from the indian nation

=== Texas ===
In May 2021, through Enel Green Power, Enel North America announced its plan to build its largest solar farm in North America southeast of Waco, another solar project in Grimes County, northwest of Houston, and a wind project near Abilene. The three projects would generate nearly 1,200 megawatts of electricity and would boost the company's generating capacity in Texas to about 2,000 megawatts, or enough for power about 400,000 homes in Texas. The solar farm in Falls County near Waco is the largest of the three projects and is designed to produce about 639 megawatts once in operation. The adjacent, utility-scale storage facility will be able to store 59 megawatts. Closer to Houston, Enel North America will also build a solar farm capable of generating 270 megawatts and accompanying battery storage of 59 megawatts in Grimes County. The third project is located in Callahan and Eastland counties and is estimated to generate 263 megawatts through wind turbines, with 87 megawatts of storage capacity through its battery system.

Also, through Enel Green Power, Enel North America started operating the Lily solar + storage project in December 2021. It is located east of Dallas, Texas, and is the company's first hybrid project in North America that integrates a renewable energy plant with utility-scale battery storage. The 181 MW Lily solar + storage project includes 55 MWdc of battery storage, part of Enel's installation of around 600 MW of new storage capacity on the Texas power grid by 2022. The project's 421,400 PV bifacial panels are expected to generate over 367 GWh annually.

In July 2022, Enel Green Power completed the Azure Sky Wind + Storage power plant, its first large-scale hybrid wind project. Located in Throckmorton County, Texas, it consists of a 350MW wind farm paired with a 137MW/205 megawatt-hour battery. As part of the project, Enel Green Power signed an aggregated power purchase agreement (PPA) with Akamai, MilliporeSigma, Synopsys and Uber. Further PPAs were also signed with Kellogg Company, HP Hood and lululemon.

=== Alberta ===
In May 2020, Enel North America connected two wind farms in Alberta, Canada – specifically, the 105-MW Riverview and the 29.4-MW Castle Rock Ridge II wind farms, which will generate around 493 GWh annually. The two wind farms operate under two 20-year Renewable Energy Support Agreements (RESAs) with the Alberta Electric System Operator (AESO). The RESAs were awarded in 2017. In June 2022, through Enel Green Power Canada Inc., Enel North America started the main construction phase of the 152 MW Grizzly Bear Creek wind project in the counties of Minburn and Vermilion River in Alberta. The project will consist of 34 turbines that are expected to generate 528 GWh of energy each year, enough to meet the electricity needs of over 73,000 Alberta households annually, as well as to avoid 343,000 tons of CO_{2} emissions. The 152 MW Grizzly Bear Creek wind project will bring the company's total installed capacity to over 360 MW in the province.

=== California ===
Enel North America entered the California market in 2009. Since then, through Enel X, it has been providing solar-plus-storage solutions subsidized under the Self-Generation Incentive Program (SGIP), in addition to demand response programs in Pacific Gas & Electric (PG&E) and Southern California Edison (SCE).

Since 2020, it has been partnering with the San Diego Blood Bank to deliver and manage a solar and battery storage system, enabling the Blood Bank to self-generate, store and consume electricity. The project combines onsite solar generation with a battery storage system. Under the terms of the agreement, Enel X operates the 334-kW/ 668-kWh battery energy storage system, which is paired with a 976-kW rooftop and solar carport system. The system allows the Blood Bank to charge its mobile operation with 100% renewable energy.

In California, Enel X North America also deployed a 67-MW highly distributed virtual power plant consisting of JuiceBox smart charging stations. The virtual power plant is active in California Independent System Operator (CAISO) markets. It also deployed more than 3,100 JuiceNet-enabled smart chargers within local Community Choice Aggregator Sonoma Clean Power's service territory.

Enel X is active in demand response in California. In the summer of 2020, when an intense heat wave hit the country and caused rolling blackouts, the majority of all California demand response programs were called into action, including five different programs across Southern California Edison (SCE) and Pacific Gas & Electric (PG&E). Enel X resources have been dispatched on average 20 hours across all programs, activating JuiceNet-enabled smart home chargers without any necessary human intervention. The average dispatch event duration to JuiceNet customers was just over 3.6 hours per day, with event participation rates above 90%.

=== Massachusetts ===
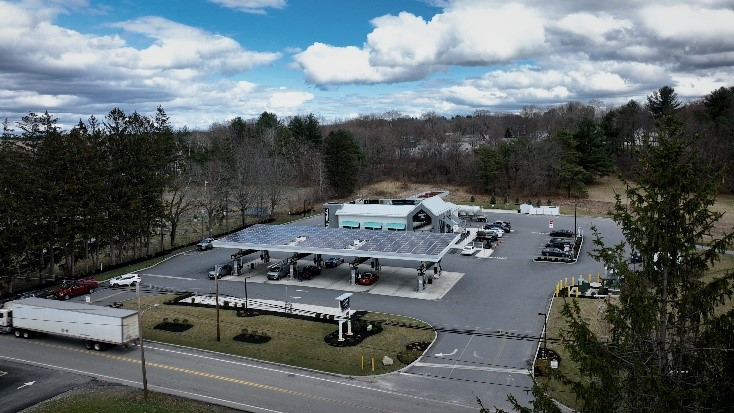
The Energy Resilient Service Station in Massachusetts

Through Enel X, Enel North America deployed solar, storage and EV charging stations at the University of Massachusetts Boston. The university partnered with Enel X to help optimize the facility's energy consumption and contribute to the Massachusetts electric grid. The project combined a 1 MW solar photovoltaic system, a 500 kW/2MWh lithium-ion battery storage system and 11 Enel X JuiceBox electric vehicle (EV) smart charging stations on the campus. The system uses Enel X's DER Optimization Software to automatically store and consume clean, low-cost electricity at times when consuming from the grid is most expensive.

As for its workforce, Enel North America reported a 16% increase in total workforce in 2020. More than 50% of new hires were sourced in Massachusetts, the company's regional headquarters. Again in 2020, Enel North America increased its partnerships with Massachusetts organizations (HP Hood, Biogen Inc, the Massachusetts Bay Transportation Authority, and the University of Massachusetts Boston), with deals ranging from power purchase agreements to fleet electrification and on-site solar and battery installation.

Since 2017, it has also been working with Kraft Sports + Entertainment to improve sustainability in Gillette Stadium, supplying renewable energy credits from locally generated clean energy and installing electric vehicle smart charging stations throughout Patriot Place. As part of the project, Gillette Stadium is enrolled in Enel X's demand response program in Massachusetts, helping to meet the grid's needs during peak demand periods.

== Corporate organization and governance ==
Enel North America is headquartered in Andover, MA, United States. Enel has additional U.S. corporate offices in Boston, MA; Houston, TX; New York, NY; Oklahoma City, OK; and San Carlos, CA.

Across the United States and Canada, the company employs more than 1,800 people, has more than 4,500 customers, a renewable capacity of 9.6 GW, a DR capacity of 4.7GW, and more than 160,000 EV charging stations.

Enel North America is organized in the following business lines: Enel Green Power, Enel X, Energy & Commodity Management, Enel X Way, Gridspertise, and Enel Innovation Hubs.

=== CEO & President ===
Enrico Viale (from July 2019).

== Sustainability and innovation commitment ==
In 2021, Enel Group brought forward its Net-Zero commitment by 10 years, to 2040, to address Enel's direct and indirect emissions. In the U.S. and Canada, its energy generation fleet is 100% renewables-based. In 2020–2021, Enel North America supported 236 sustainability projects ranging from workforce development to environmental sustainability.

For example, as part of its sustainability and innovation commitment, the company is exploring how to use spent blades for long-duration energy storage. The project is carried out in collaboration with energy storage startup Energy Vault and aims at exploring how to grind up blades, remove the fibers and use them to fortify the large blocks Energy Vault plans to use for its proposed gravity-based system. In the meantime, ground-up blades are already being put to use to make cement.

Following Enel North America's acquisition of a portfolio of six development-stage solar-plus-storage projects in New Jersey, a proposed sustainability and innovation project features the combination of solar generation and agriculture on the same piece of land ("agrivoltaics" or "dual-use solar"). As a result, one of the properties involved will have an integrated sheep farm, a way to continue the agricultural use of the property and avoid expensive grass mowing.

Enel North America also contributes to the Oklahoma Leopold Conservation Award, which recognizes agricultural landowners actively committed to a land ethic. The program builds bridges between agriculture, government, environmental organizations, industry and academia to advance the cause of private lands conservation. The Oklahoma Leopold Conservation Award consists of $10,000 and a crystal award.

The company also established two Innovation Hubs in the U.S., one in San Francisco and one in Boston. Innovation Hubs are physical spaces where startups can present their projects to Enel's Innovation Managers, as well as to each other. This allows Enel to collaborate with energy startups and help them develop, test, and scale new technologies and business models. Innovation Hubs are also able to work with each other. In October 2020, Enel North America expanded its energy innovation reach into Canada through a partnership with MaRS Discovery District, North America's urban innovation hub. The project focuses on specific topics related to energy transition, digitization, clean technology, and automation. In October 2022, Enel North America opened a wind training facility and office in Oklahoma City to train wind turbine technicians. The facility includes classrooms and simulation facilities for learning how to work inside turbines, as well as courses on safety, professional development, working at heights, and ladder rescues taught through virtual reality, hands-on simulation, and discussions. Each year, the facility could train more than 150 new and existing employees.

== Awards ==
In 2021, Enel X was named to Fast Company's annual list of the World's Most Innovative Companies in the energy category. The company was recognized for its smart EV charging solutions.

Furthermore, in the same year, the Boston Business Journal ranked Enel North America 2nd among the largest clean energy companies in Massachusetts.

Also in 2021, Enel North America ranked as a top scorer in the 2021 Disability Equality Index (DEI), the world's most comprehensive benchmarking tool for the Fortune 1000 to measure disability workplace inclusion.

In 2022, Fast Company named Enel North America Best Workplace for Innovators. The same year, Enel North America was named a Best Energy Workplace by ALLY Energy in the GRIT Awards Enel X Way's home charging station, the JuiceBox, was named the "best EV charger overall" in 2022 by CNET Roadshow.
