= Alan Johnson (priest) =

Anglican priest (fl. 1937–1958)

Alan Sydney Harvey Johnson was Archdeacon of Bombay from 1951 until 1958.

Johnson was educated Bishop’s College, Calcutta; and ordained in 1937. He was Chaplain at Byculla, Berar and Parel before his time as Archdeacon.
