= Alan Johnston (cricketer) =

Irish cricketer

Personal information
- Full name: Alan David Johnston
- Born: 14 September 1953
- Died: 29 March 2017 (aged 63)
- Source: Cricinfo, 30 April 2021

Alan Johnston (14 September 1953 – 29 March 2017) was an Irish cricketer. He played in one List A match for the Ireland cricket team in 1990. He played for Lurgan Cricket Club in Ireland, and three matches for the national team. His three matches for Ireland were against two English county sides; Worcestershire and Sussex.
