= Allen Johnson (disambiguation) =

Allen Johnson (born 1971) is a retired American hurdler.

Allen Johnson may also refer to:

- Allen Johnson (Indian Army officer) (1829–1907), British Indian Army officer
- Allen Johnson (historian) (1870–1931), American historian, Professor of History at Yale University
- Allen Johnson (activist), African-American Civil Rights Leader and minister
- Allen F. Johnson, American diplomat

== See also ==
- Alann Johnson, American politician
- Alan Johnson (disambiguation)
- Alan Johnston (disambiguation)
