= Allan Johnston (Australian footballer) =

Australian rules footballer

Personal information
- Full name: Allan Vincent Johnston
- Born: 23 July 1906
- Died: 6 June 1944 (aged 37) near Wangaratta
- Original teams: Moyhu, Fitzroy Reserves
- Height: 193 cm (6 ft 4 in)
- Weight: 85 kg (187 lb)

Playing career^{1}
Years	Club	Games (Goals)
1928	Fitzroy	2 (0)
- ^{1} Playing statistics correct to the end of 1928.

Allan Vincent Johnston (23 July 1906 – 6 June 1944) was an Australian rules footballer who played for the Fitzroy Football Club in the Victorian Football League (VFL).

He was killed in a car accident near Wangaratta on 6 June 1944, which was caused by him sneezing while at the wheel.
