= Alvin Johnson (serial killer) =

Convicted American serial killer

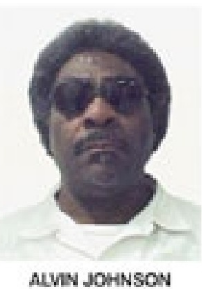
- Born: 1944; Smithville, Texas, U.S.
- Died: May 21, 2016 (aged 71–72); Utah State Prison, Draper, Utah, U.S.
- Convictions: First degree murder x1 Rape x1 Manslaughter x1
- Penalty: Life imprisonment (Clark); 10 years (Geller)

Details
- Victims: 3 (2 convictions)
- Span of crimes: 1972–1983
- Country: United States
- States: Oregon, California, Utah
- Date apprehended: August 20, 1983

Alvin Johnson (1944 – May 21, 2016) was an American serial killer linked to three murders across three states from 1972 to 1983. Officially convicted in two homicides in Oregon and Utah, he was later linked to a third one committed with fellow serial killer Wilbur Lee Jennings in California, but was not charged due to his current life sentence in Utah.

== Early life ==
Alvin Johnson was born in 1944 in Smithville, Texas, one of 14 children born to poor tenant farmers. When he was young, Johnson was accidentally struck with the head of an axe handle, which thereafter caused him to have bouts of amnesia and dizziness, and is also said to have displayed symptoms of schizophrenia. In his adulthood, he became a transient and travelled cross-country, surviving by working as a laborer on various farms.

== Murders ==
=== Roger Geller ===
On September 26, 1972, Johnson was in Klamath Falls, Oregon, when he broke into the hotel room of 50-year-old Roger E. Geller, a cook who had recently quit his job to return to his home state of Nebraska. He beat Geller on the head and finally strangled him, before stealing his wallet and money and then fleeing the hotel. The victim's body was discovered by a maid the following day.

The day after Geller's murder, Johnson was arrested and charged with the crime. For the next few months, he was kept in the city's jail to await trial, but on January 1, 1973, Johnson and another inmate, 35-year-old Wolfred Dean Hill, attempted to escape. After managing to lock their jailer in a supply closet, the pair stole two knives and overpowered a police officer, but in the ensuing scuffle, Johnson was shot in the shoulder. They nevertheless stole his gun and then fled in a patrol car, but each was recaptured only a few hours after their attempted escape – Johnson was left abandoned at a ditch, while Hill surrendered at a basketball court when surrounded by police. Sometime after his recapture, Johnson was tried, convicted of manslaughter, and sentenced to 10 years imprisonment.

=== Clarice Reinke ===
In early 1983, Johnson was released from prison after serving the entirety of his sentence. He continued traveling around the country, until he eventually found himself at a rescue mission in Fresno, California. While living there, under unclear circumstances, he partnered up with Wilbur Lee Jennings, a local serial killer who preyed upon prostitutes. On June 23, 1983, the two men travelled to Easton and broke into the home of 76-year-old Clarice Lula Reinke, whom they proceeded to rape and then strangle to death. At the time, neither man was considered a suspect and the murder quickly became a cold case; for unknown reasons, Johnson and Jennings went their separate ways, with the former continuing his travels cross-country.

=== James Clark ===
In early August, Johnson arrived in Salt Lake City, Utah, where on August 7, he kidnapped 38-year-old James M. Clark and his wife Ann Lee, who were visiting from Texas. He kept the pair in a warehouse, before ordering James to undress himself and tying him up. Johnson then beat him into unconsciousness with a shovel handle before slapping Ann, and ordering her to do the same. When she did, Johnson proceeded to rape her. After he finished, he again grabbed the shovel handle and beat James to death, before knocking Ann into unconsciousness and then leaving the premises.

After she came about, Ann managed to free herself, put on her husband's clothes and go to the nearest police station, where she described what had happened. An arrest warrant was issued for Johnson, who was arrested on the following day aboard a freight train in Lincoln, Nebraska. Despite his intention on fighting extradition proceedings, Johnson was brought back to Utah to stand trial for the case.

== Trial and imprisonment ==
Johnson's trial began the following year. During proceedings, it was determined that he had an intellectual disability and had chronic alcoholism which heavily influenced him at the time of the murder, and thusly, he was spared the death penalty and sentenced to two life sentences with a chance of parole instead.

Alvin Johnson's parole was scheduled for June 9, 2009. However, the year before that, his and Jennings' DNA were linked to semen left at the Reinke murder scene and Johnson's parole was revoked. Neither man would stand trial for her murder. Jennings died in 2014 before he could be put on trial. Johnson was presumably never charged with the case, on account of his existing life sentence in Utah. According to Utah Board of Pardons and Parole records, Johnson died while imprisoned at Utah State Prison on May 21, 2016.

== See also ==
- List of serial killers in the United States
