= Thomas Alan Johnston =

Scottish engineer (1944–2024)

Thomas Alan Johnston (August 1944 – 10 July 2024) was a Scottish engineer.

== Life and career ==
Johnston was the chief executive of Glasgow-based Babtie Group Ltd. Since the company's acquisition by Jacobs Engineering Group, Inc in 2004, he has continued to work for Jacobs Babtie Group Ltd. In 1995 Johnston was elected Fellow of the Royal Academy of Engineering. Johnston died on 10 July 2024, at the age of 79.

== Sources ==
- Thomas Alan Johnston in Royal Academy of Engineering's Media Database of Fellows
