= Alvin J. Johnson =

19th-century American cartographer

Alvin Jewett Johnson (September 23, 1827 – 1884), also known as A.J. Johnson, led the New York City publishing company which published Johnson's Family Atlases from 1860 to 1887. These atlases were published under his name alone or with Ross C. Browning (1860–62) and Benjamin P. Ward (1862-1866).

Johnson's maps are valuable to researchers because they were updated regularly. Because of this, they document the growth of the United States during the period in which they were published, showing the step-by-step expansion of railroads and the development of new states, counties and towns. In order for these loose maps to be of full use to historians for study (new counties showed up within two years of their creation and new states of the union almost as soon as they were announced) loose maps from these atlases need to be definitively dated. Collectors also need to know the true date of the maps; while some of the states/variations were utilized for up to two years, many changes occurred sometimes within one year, thus making some versions more plentiful than others.

== Early life ==
Johnson was born in Wallingford, Vermont, on September 23, 1827.

According to Johnson, he came from a poor family in which he was the eldest of 12 children. When he was 11 years old he began to work on farms for $5 a day plus board, work he continued until he was 21 years old. He came from a background in which sons owed their fathers time and dedication until they were 21 years of age, and Johnson "bought his time" back by offering his father $25 a year until he reached 21. At the same time he entered high school at the Black River Academy and was enrolled there until his education was completed, supporting himself during this time by working on farms in the summer and teaching lower school in the winter. When he was 22 years old, he moved to Lunenburg Court House in southern Virginia, where he taught for three years. In 1851, he married Helena Warner of Sunderland, Massachusetts, and had a son and two daughters.

== Book salesman ==
In 1853, Johnson returned to the North and started working as a book canvasser, selling books and atlases door to door by subscription. Only a little detail is available about Johnson's early life as a book canvasser and it remains unclear as to where and exactly when it began and what products he was selling. However, in an 1868 letter to his major New England agent, Lewis W. Fairchild, Johnson described how he worked in Boston, as a "general agent" for J.H. Colton. This is the first indication of a relationship between Johnson and Colton. It is not clear if Johnson exclusively sold Colton products, or sold other books as well during all or any of the years before coming to New York. This Fairchild letter also indicates that Johnson moved to Ohio after working for Colton in Boston.

Just prior to coming to New York to develop his publishing company, it appears as if Johnson's Ohio base where he lived and worked was Cleveland, Ohio. The New York City Directory first lists Johnson in their 1855-56 edition, describing him as a publisher living in Ohio. In another 1868 letter to Fairchild, Johnson recalls that in 1855 his "old headquarters" were in Cleveland. He indicates further in the same letter, that one of his helpers in Ohio was Browning, who was a joint publisher with Johnson from 1859 through 1862. Neither Johnson's nor Browning's name shows up in a city directory of Cleveland in the year immediately before either of them came from Ohio to New York. Unfortunately, there were no Cleveland Directories in the two years before that. Cleveland was, however, the home of a book and stationery dealer named Henry P. B. Jewett, who was a distant relative of Johnson, and it is possible that Johnson used Jewett's business as his Cleveland base.

== Map publisher ==
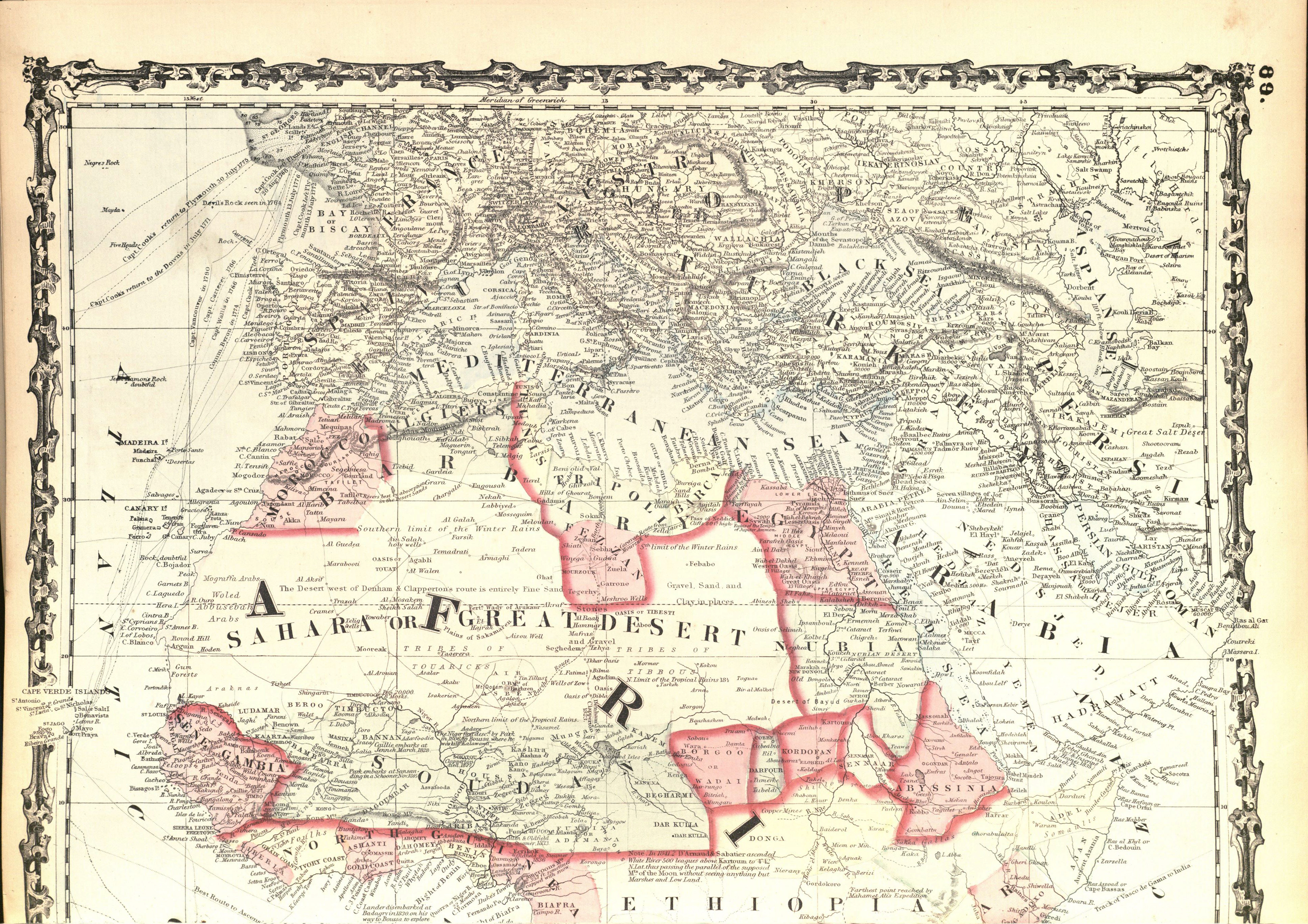
J. H. Colton and Johnson's 1862 map of Africa

The first evidence that Johnson entered the map publishing business comes from 1854. At that time, while still living in Cleveland, Johnson teamed up with Samuel N. Gaston, of New York, to produce a new map of the United States titled, "A New Map of our Country". The two of them also published the same map in 1855, which was attributed as being published in Cleveland as well as in New York; the same year, Johnson's name first showed up in the New York City directory, as a publisher and at an address later used by Gaston in 1856. It is not clear the role that Johnson played in the financing and/or the production of the Map of our Country, but, in a letter to Fairchild, he referred to himself as the regional agent for the map. The relationship with Gaston did not seem to lead far, and the next year, 1856, Gaston published the Map of our Country and a two volume geography, The Diamond Atlas, with Charles Morse.

In 1857, Johnson appears to have moved to New York, where the New York City Directory lists him as a map publisher, and as living in New York. In that same year, Johnson made what appears to be his second foray into the map publishing business when, with D. Griffing Johnson, he produced "A new map of the Union with the adjacent Islands and Countries, from authentic sources". D.G. Johnson had been a map engraver and publisher on his own from at least 1847, when Ristow notes he published a map, "Johnson's [D.G.] Illustrated & Embellished Steel Plate Map of the World on Mercator's Projection.", which was republished by Colton the next year. Most evidence points to the fact that D.G. and A.J. Johnson were not related, but it is possible they were. It does not seem as if A.J. Johnson had the capacity at that time in his career to actually produce maps, and his relationship with D.G. Johnson was probably as a financial backer, similar to what appears to have been his original relationship with Gaston. Both the 1856–57 and 1858-59 New York City Directory's, list D.G. and A.J. Johnson at the same address in New York City. After that, D.G. Johnson's name disappears from both map attributions and directory listings, and he died five years later in 1863.

== Atlas publisher ==
By the mid 1860s, the American atlas industry had matured into a thriving business. The major players in this field at that time were S. Augustus Mitchell and Joseph H. Colton. Mitchell had been publishing atlases since 1831, the year he first issued his New American Atlas, a reissue of Finely's similarly titled atlas of 1826. By the time he retired and handed over his business to his son, S. Augustus Mitchell, Jr., in 1860, he was the major publisher of atlases and maps in America. In that same year his company published the first edition of Mitchell's New General Atlas, which was published until 1879 by the Mitchell firm and from 1880 to 1893 by other publishers. Colton, who had been publishing maps since about 1833, first published atlases in 1855, with the first edition of Colton's Atlas of the World Illustrating Physical and Railroad Geography. This grander, folio sized, and by 1856 two volume new atlas, and its 1857 successor, Colton's General Atlas, produced by this well known map publisher, quickly became a major competitor to Mitchell's maps and atlases Also in 1860, Alvin Jewett Johnson published another competing atlas, Johnson's New Illustrated (steel plate) Family Atlas, with Descriptions, Geographical, Statistical, and Historical. While Johnson was a newcomer to the map and atlas industry, and never gained the historical fame of either Mitchell or Colton, his atlases and its maps, published until 1887, appeared to have been popular, and, over the last decade, have become increasingly valued among collectors.

== See also ==
- Cartography
- U.S. Johnson Map Project
