= Ben Thompson (lawman) =

American gunman, gambler, and lawman

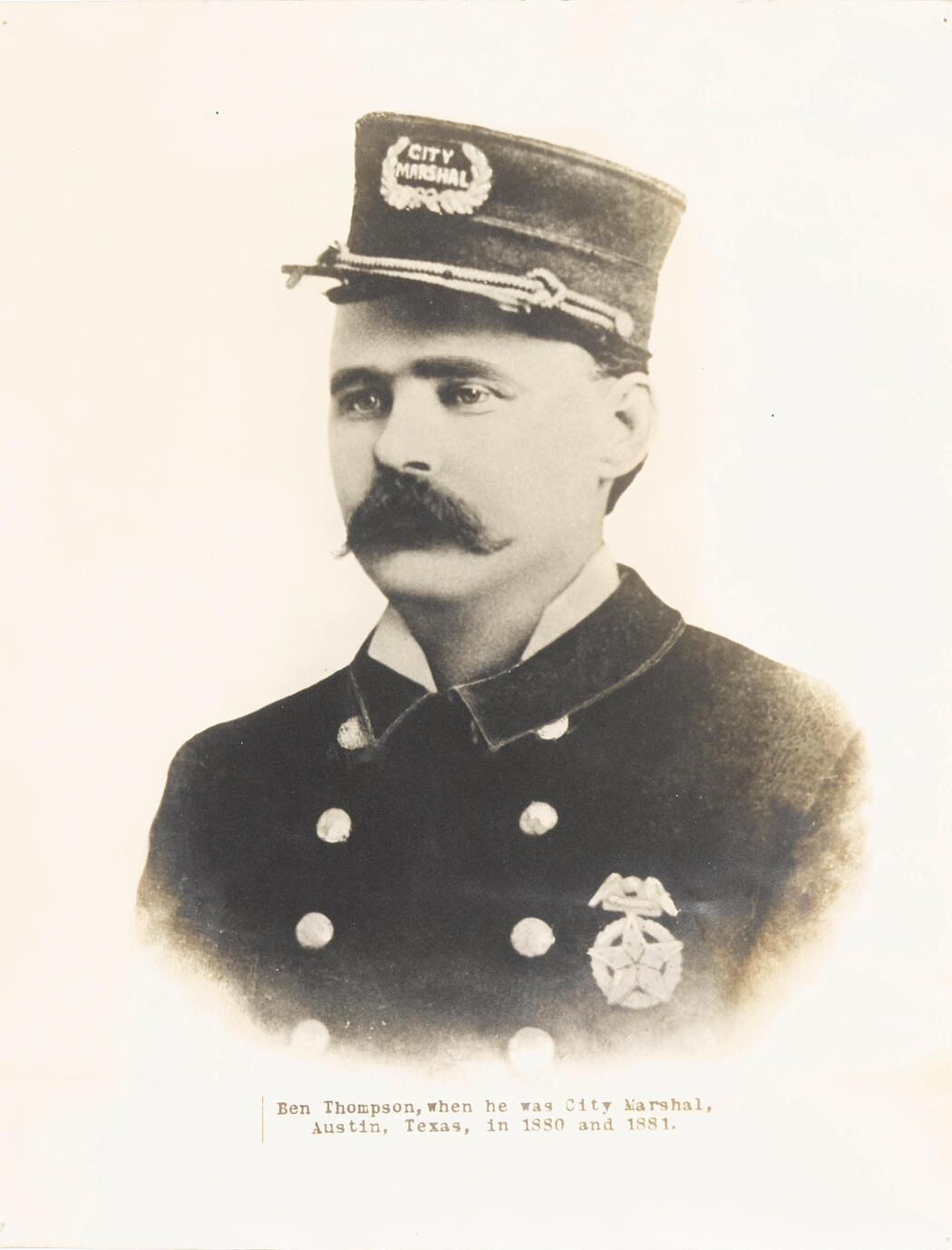
- Ben Thompson as a City Marshal of Austin Texas.
- Born: Ben Thompson; November 2, 1843; Knottingley, West Yorkshire, England
- Died: March 11, 1884 (aged 40); San Antonio, Texas, U.S
- Cause of death: Gunshot wounds
- Occupations: Gunfighter, gambler, and lawman
- Years active: 1868 – 1884
- Known for: Lawman and gunfighter of the old West

Ben Thompson (November 2, 1843 – March 11, 1884) was a gunman, gambler, and sometimes lawman of the Old West. He was a contemporary of "Buffalo" Bill Cody, Bat Masterson, John Wesley Hardin, and "Wild Bill" Hickok, some of whom considered him a friend, others an enemy. Thompson fought for the Confederacy during the Civil War, and later for Emperor Maximilian in Mexico. After he was hired in 1881 as marshal in Austin, Texas, the crime rate reportedly dropped sharply. Thompson was murdered at the age of 40 in San Antonio, Texas, in the "Vaudeville Theater Ambush."

== Early life ==
Thompson was born in Knottingley, West Yorkshire, England to William and Mary Ann [nee Baker] Thompson, in November 1843. The family settled in Austin in late 1852. Ben was 8 years old, William 6, and Mary Jane 4 years old at the time.

Thompson worked for the Austin Rambler as a news printer's assistant while in his teens. Once he discovered gambling, however, Thompson began traveling and earning a living as a professional gambler.

== Military service ==
On June 12, 1861, Thompson enlisted in the Confederate States Army at San Antonio, and became a private in the 2nd Regiment, Texas Mounted Rifles, Company H. His brother, Billy Thompson, joined the same regiment.

On January 1–2, 1863, Thompson participated in the Battle of Galveston, where the USS Harriet Lane was captured. Thompson was wounded during the battle, and was treated for six weeks in a military hospital at Niblett's Bluff (located west of Vinton, Louisiana).

Later that same year, Thompson took part in the Battle of LaFourche Crossing (June 20, 1863), near Thibodaux, Louisiana. The two Thompson brothers "found themselves at night separated from the living and standing among the dead." After this battle, Thompson returned home to Austin. He re-enlisted in Company F in September 1863, and served out the remainder of the war stationed along the banks of the Rio Grande.

== Post war life ==
=== Mexico ===
After the conclusion of the Civil War, Thompson fought in the armed forces of Emperor Maximilian against the Mexican revolutionaries.

=== Imprisonment ===
In 1868 Thompson received word that his wife was being physically abused by her brother, Jim Moore. Soon after his return to Texas, he confronted Moore, and severely injured him. Charged with attempted murder, the 25-year-old Thompson was convicted and sentenced to two years in prison. He served time at Huntsville Prison, but eventually received a full pardon.

=== Abilene, Wild Bill, and John Wesley Hardin ===
In 1870, Thompson left Texas for Abilene, Kansas, which had become a boomtown due to the expanding cattle trade. In 1871, Thompson opened the "Bulls Head Saloon" in Abilene, with friend and partner, Phil Coe. Their saloon prospered due to the many cattle drives that gave Abilene a steady stream of cowboys passing through who were anxious to drink and gamble.

It was at the Bulls Head Saloon that Thompson and Coe made the acquaintance of John Wesley Hardin, and actively recruited him in an attempt to rid the town of its marshal, "Wild" Bill Hickok. The two entrepreneurs had painted a picture of a bull with a large erect penis on the side of their establishment as a form of advertisement. Citizens of the town had complained to Hickok. When Thompson and Coe refused his request to remove the bull, Hickok had altered it himself. Infuriated, Thompson tried to incite Hardin by exclaiming to him: "He's a damn Yankee. Picks on rebels, especially Texans, to kill." Hardin, then living under the assumed name of "Wesley Clemmons" (but better known to the townspeople by the alias, "Little Arkansas"), replied, "If Wild Bill needs killin', why don't you kill him yourself?"[sic] Later that night, Hardin was confronted by Hickok, who told him to hand over his guns, which he did. Hickok had no knowledge at the time of Hardin being a wanted man, and he advised "Clemmons" to avoid problems while remaining in Abilene.

Soon afterward, Thompson was injured in a fall from a horse. While he was recuperating, Coe was involved in a fatal shootout with Hickok. Thompson never confronted Hickok over the shooting of Coe, and both men left Abilene soon afterward.

=== Altercation in Ellsworth ===
Thompson moved to Ellsworth, Kansas, which was also prospering as a cattle boomtown. On August 15, 1873, Thompson's younger brother, Billy, shot and killed Sheriff Chauncey Whitney. Whitney was standing near the two Thompson brothers, who were facing off against a local police officer, John "Happy Jack" Morco, and a gambler, John Sterling. The confrontation had developed over a gambling dispute. Whitney was a friend to both brothers, and numerous witnesses confirmed that Whitney stated before he died that the shooting was accidental.

Wyatt Earp claimed in an interview with his future biographer, Stuart Lake, that he had arrested Thompson after the altercation although contemporary news accounts and Thompson's own biography describing the episode don't mention his presence at all. But Lake's story Wyatt Earp: Frontier Marshal, published two years after Earp's death, has been found by modern researchers to be a largely fictionalized biography, and the story he described of Earp's role in arresting Thompson was likely an "exaggerated account".

Morco filed charges of assault against Ben Thompson the following day, due to Thompson's having fired in his direction prior to Whitney being shot. Officer Ed Hogue arrested Ben Thompson. That same week, police officer Ed Crawford killed Thompson's friend, Cad Pierce, in an incident that Crawford reportedly provoked. Morco and Hogue soon ran another Thompson friend, Neil Cain, out of town. The town council dismissed Morco, Hogue, and Crawford, for inappropriate behavior. Soon after, newly appointed police officer, J.C. "Charlie" Brown, killed Morco when he pulled a gun during a disturbance. Friends of Cad Pierce soon killed Crawford. Ed Hogue left town. Billy Thompson fled Kansas, too, but eventually was returned to be unsuccessfully tried for the death of Sheriff Whitney.

== Later life ==
=== Return to Texas ===
In 1875, Ben Thompson returned to Texas, staying at Fort Elliott, in the Panhandle. There he met and befriended Bat Masterson. When Masterson shot and killed a cavalry Corporal Melvin King in a dispute over a woman, Thompson stepped in to prevent other soldiers from attacking Masterson. After that incident, the Santa Fe Railroad hired both gunmen to intercede in a right-of-way dispute between that railroad and the Rio Grande Railroad.

After the railway dispute ended, Thompson returned to Austin, where he opened the Iron Front Saloon. One of his competitors was the Capital Theater, owned and operated by Mark Wilson. On Christmas Eve 1876, Thompson and friends were at the Capital Theater drinking when a fight erupted involving other patrons. When Thompson tried to intervene, Wilson produced a shotgun and fired at Thompson but missed. Thompson then killed Wilson. A bartender, Charley Matthews, fired a Winchester rifle and grazed Thompson's hip. Thompson returned fire, hitting Matthews. Though seriously wounded, Matthews survived. Thompson was not arrested, as the shooting was ruled self defense.

In June 1880, Ben Thompson asked Masterson to go to Ogallala, Nebraska (then "the end of the Texas Trail"), to rescue his younger brother Billy, who was in trouble again as a result of being involved in a shootout. Masterson, Ben, and Billy Thompson escaped from Ogallala, and headed to Dodge City.

=== In Austin, Texas ===
In 1881, Thompson was hired by the city of Austin to serve as a city marshal. The following year, Thompson was involved in a dispute with Vaudeville Variety Theater owner, Jack Harris, in San Antonio. Thompson shot and killed Harris. Thompson was indicted for murder, and resigned his position as marshal. He was tried and acquitted, after which he returned to Austin. He was welcomed by the citizens, but he did not return to his law enforcement job.

== Murdered in San Antonio ==
While on business in San Antonio, on March 11, 1884, Thompson ran into rancher, King Fisher. The two men, who had known one another for several years, decided to attend shows at the Turner Hall Opera House, and later at the Vaudeville Variety Theater. A local lawman, Jacob Coy, sat with them. Thompson wanted to see Joe Foster, a theater owner who had been a friend of Harris's. Thompson had already spoken to Billy Simms, another theater owner, and Foster's new partner.

Fisher and Thompson were directed upstairs to meet with Foster. Coy and Simms also joined them in the theater box. Foster refused to speak with Thompson. Fisher allegedly noticed that something was not right, when suddenly Simms and Coy stepped aside. As they did, a hail of bullets from an adjoining box hit Thompson and Fisher. Thompson fell, and either Coy or Foster ran up to him and shot him in the head with a pistol. Thompson died almost immediately. Fisher was shot thirteen times, but fired one round in retaliation, possibly wounding Coy, who was crippled for life. While trying to draw his pistol, Foster had shot himself in the leg, which was later amputated. He died soon after the surgery.

== Burial ==
Thompson's body was returned to Austin. He is buried in Oakwood Cemetery in Austin.

== Fate of Thompson's property ==
Thompson's will deeded all his property to his business partner. Among Thompson's gun collection was a custom made and engraved Stevens-Lord No. 36 target pistol, given to him as a gift from Buffalo Bill.

On January 13, 2007, Ben Thompson's roulette table was sold at auction in Waco, Texas. It was reported that the table was used by Thompson in a gambling house he opened above the Iron Front Saloon, which had been located on Congress Avenue in Austin.

== Television portrayal ==
Thompson's character is played by Denver Pyle in seven episodes of the ABC television series, The Life and Legend of Wyatt Earp, with Hugh O'Brian in the title role. In one episode "The Time for All Good Men" (June 4, 1957), the actor Mike Ragan played Clay Allison, who joins Thompson and John Wesley Hardin (Phillip Pine) in coming to Earp's aid in a shootout with the owner and foreman, respectively, of the Big T Ranch, Rance Purcell (Richard Devon) and Gus Andrews (Grant Withers). Walter Coy played Thompson in a single 1959 episode of the same series. Don Megowan portrayed Thompson in the episode "Hide Jumpers" (January 27, 1958) of the NBC television series, Tales of Wells Fargo.

== Bibliography ==
- Adams, Paul. "The Unsolved Murder of Ben Thompson." Southwestern Historical Quarterly 48, January 1945.
- DeMattos, Jack. "Gunfighters of the Real West: Ben Thompson." Real West, October 1985.
- Heath, Charles G. "The Thompsons of Knottingly." NOLA Quarterly, Vol. XIV, No. 1, Spring 1990.
- Masterson, W.B. (Bat). "Famous Gun Fighters of the Western Frontier: Ben Thompson." Human Life Magazine, Vol. 4, No. 4, January 1907.
- Starr, Mary. History of Travis County and Austin, 1839-1899. Texian Press, 1963.
- Streeter, Floyd Benjamin. The Complete and Authentic Life of Ben Thompson: Man With a Gun, New York: Frederick Fell, Inc., 1957.
- Thorpe, John "Ben and Billy Thompson." English Westerners Brand Book, Vol. XXIII, No. 1. Winter, 1984.
- Walton, W.M. The Life and Adventures of Ben Thompson: The Famous Texan, self-published by the author in 1884. A facsimile edition was published by The Steck Company of Austin, Texas in 1956.

== Fictional portrayals ==
- Braun, Matt (September 2000). Deathwalk. St. Martin's. p. 336. ISBN 0-312-97516-3.
- J. Silverman, "When the bad guys really wore the badges: SF Stages' new work by Kilmurry", Santa Fe New Mexican, (New Mexico), July 4, 1997.
