= Alann Johnson =

American politician

Member of the Alabama House of Representatives from the 53rd district
- In office April 1, 2014 – November 4, 2014
- Preceded by: Demetrius Newton
- Succeeded by: Anthony Daniels

Personal details
- Party: Democratic
- Education: Morehouse School of Religion

Anthony "Alann" Johnson is an American politician from the state of Alabama. He is a member of the Alabama House of Representatives.

Johnson is a former legislative aide to the Alabama House. He worked as the executive director of Leadership Jefferson County and an associate minister at Zion Star Missionary Baptist Church. He won a special election on April 1, 2014, to succeed Demetrius Newton as the representative from District 53. The district has been eliminated through redistricting, and Johnson will not run for reelection to the state House in the November 2014 elections.

Johnson graduated from the Morehouse School of Religion. He is the grandson of Nelson Henry Smith, Jr., a minister associated with the Civil Rights Movement.
