= Tornado outbreak of April 13–16, 2012 =

Tornado outbreak in the United States

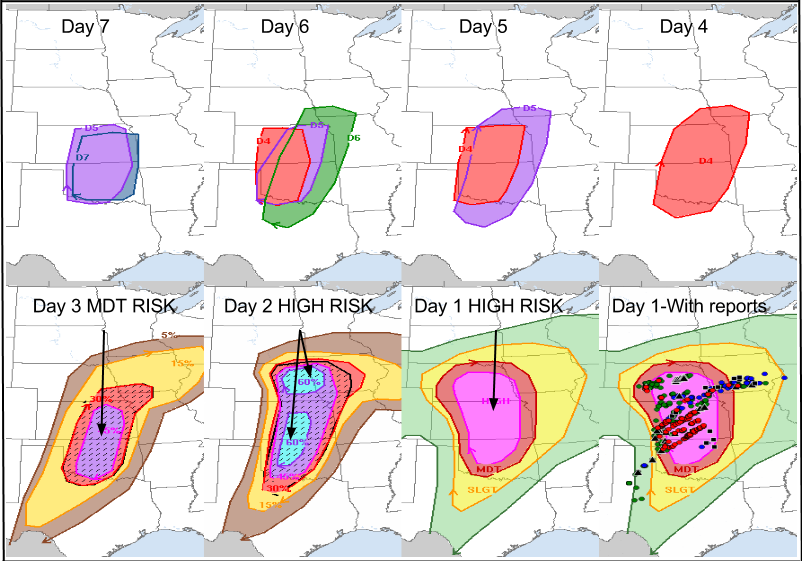
- A montage of the Storm Prediction Center's severe weather outlooks leading up to the outbreak on April 14. The final image is a verification of the day one high-risk outlook with reported events.

Meteorological history
- Duration: April 13–16, 2012

Tornado outbreak
- Tornadoes: 113 confirmed
- Max. rating: EF4 tornado
- Duration: 2 days, 16 hours, 37 minutes
- Highest winds: Tornadic - 166–200 mph (267–322 km/h) (EF4 near Langley, Kansas on April 14)
- Highest gusts: Straight-line - 97 mph (156 km/h) near Oskaloosa, Iowa on April 14.
- Largest hail: 4.50 in (11.4 cm) in diameter in Randolph, Kansas, on April 15

Overall effects
- Fatalities: 6
- Injuries: 101
- Damage: > $500 million (2012 USD)
- Areas affected: Great Plains, Central United States
- Part of the Tornadoes of 2012

From April 13 to 16, 2012, a major tornado outbreak occurred across a large portion of the Great Plains region of the United States. The storms resulted in six tornado-related fatalities, all of which occurred as a result of a nighttime EF3 tornado that caused major damage in and around Woodward, Oklahoma. Numerous other tornadoes occurred, including a violent EF4 tornado that passed near Marquette, Kansas, and an EF3 tornado that caused major damage in Wichita.

== Meteorological synopsis ==
An impressive low pressure area and associated trough began tracking into the Great Plains on April 13, and a slight risk of severe weather was issued. The outlook mentioned the possibility of tornadoes, including the risk for isolated strong tornadoes. No strong tornadoes occurred, though an EF1 tornado caused considerable damage in Norman, Oklahoma.

For only the second time in history (previously for April 7, 2006; and not occurring again subsequently until March 15, 2025), a day two high risk of severe weather was issued by the Storm Prediction Center around 0600 UTC on April 13, 2012. This is also the first and only time a Day 2 High Risk was introduced for the 0600 UTC Day 2 Outlook, as other aforementioned Day 2 High Risk outlooks were upgraded at for the 1730 UTC issuance. In the discussion, the SPC stated that a major tornado outbreak was likely across central Kansas and north-central Oklahoma in the afternoon and night of April 14, with long-tracked violent tornadoes likely. It was later expanded to include a second high risk area across much of Nebraska, where a rare 45% tornado probability was given during the early morning update on April 14. In the morning of the 14th, the high risk area was expanded again to combine the two separate areas into a single large one. Later in the day, the 45% tornado probability was shifted from Nebraska south to Kansas and northern Oklahoma. A large outbreak of tornadoes impacted the Great Plains states on April 14, and several PDS tornado warnings were issued during the outbreak. Initially, most of the tornadoes were small or remained over open country, though more significant tornado activity began to develop throughout the day. A high-end EF2 tornado struck Creston, Iowa, flipping vehicles and causing major structural damage to homes and other buildings in town. Another EF2 wedge tornado struck Thurman, Iowa, damaging 75% of the town. In Nebraska, a strong EF2 tornado destroyed outbuildings and badly damaged a home near Cook, while a large and violent EF4 tornado leveled a home and debarked trees near Marquette, Kansas. Later that evening, a cyclic supercell thunderstorm developed in northern Oklahoma before moving into southern Kansas, producing multiple tornadoes along the way. This included a large EF3 wedge tornado that destroyed homes near Conway Springs. As this supercell moved into Wichita around 10:15 pm CDT (0315 UTC), another large EF3 wedge tornado touched down and caused major damage in the southeastern part of the city. Staff at the Wichita National Weather Service Weather Forecast Office at Wichita Mid-Continent Airport were forced to hand over responsibility for their County Warning Area to the National Weather Service office in Topeka and take shelter at about 10:00 pm CDT (0300 UTC), returning to duty half an hour later. Another supercell thunderstorm also produced two EF3 wedge tornadoes that passed near Fellsburg and Hudson, causing significant damage.

Around 10:00 p.m. CDT (0300 UTC), a broken squall line began to form across the eastern portions of the Texas and Oklahoma panhandles; a thunderstorm developed ahead of the northern line segment in northwestern Wheeler County, Texas, at approximately 10:30 p.m. CDT (0330 UTC), and began developing supercell characteristics as it tracked northeastward into the Oklahoma counties of Ellis and Roger Mills. A tornado warning was issued for Ellis, Harper and Woodward counties at 12:00 am CDT (0500 UTC) on April 15 after weather spotters reported a tornado spawned by this supercell located 7 miles (11 km) southeast of Gage in Ellis County. This high-end EF3 tornado later struck Woodward, Oklahoma, at 12:20 am CDT (0520 UTC), killing six people. Multiple homes and businesses were destroyed in Woodward, and all fatalities occurred as a result of destroyed mobile homes. Additional weak tornadoes occurred on April 15 and 16 before the outbreak came to an end.

== Confirmed tornadoes ==
Confirmed tornadoes by Enhanced Fujita rating
EFU	EF0	EF1	EF2	EF3	EF4	EF5	Total
0	68	36	3	5	1	0	113

=== Lyons–Kanopolis Lake–Salina, Kansas ===
Lyons–Kanopolis Lake–Salina, Kansas
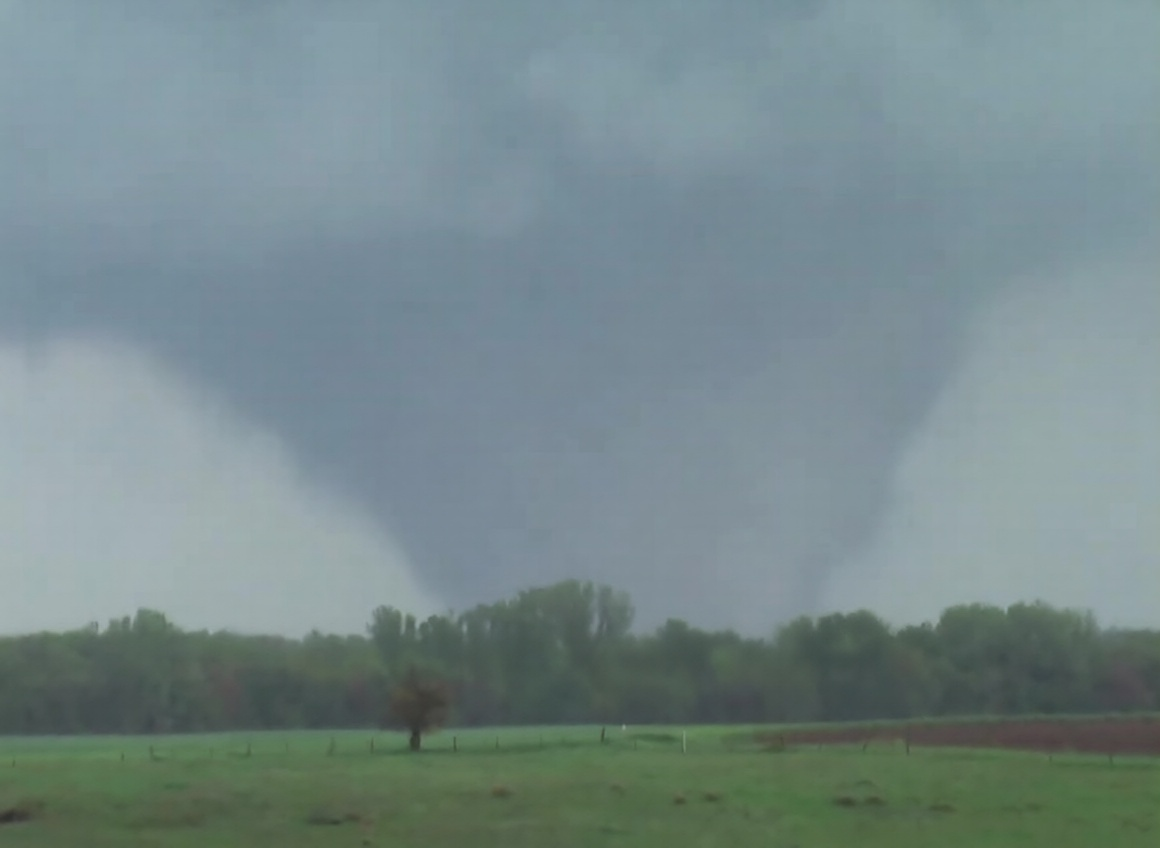
- The tornado seen near Kanopolis Lake.

Meteorological history
- Formed: April 14, 2012, 5:33 pm CDT (UTC−05:00)
- Dissipated: April 14, 2012, 6:36 pm CDT (UTC−05:00)
- Duration: 1 hour, 3 minutes

EF4 tornado
- on the Enhanced Fujita scale
- Highest winds: 166–200 mph (267–322 km/h)

Overall effects
- Fatalities: 0
- Injuries: 0

The strongest tornado of the outbreak, was this long-lived and violent EF4 tornado that tracked across portions of central Kansas on April 14. At 5:30 pm, a supercell moved into Rice County, before dropping down a tornado in the northwest-central part of the county, northwest of Lyons at 5:33 pm. Along a 15.55 mi (25.03 km) long, northeasterly path southwest to east of Geneseo, the tornado stripped off the gutters and shingles off one home, snapped five power poles and launched them into a nearby field, and ripped two truck axles off a vehicle from an unknown location into the open farmland. Several large trees had their trunks snapped and twisted, including some cottonwood species. The tornado within Rice County at maximum, caused EF2 damage before moving into Ellsworth County.

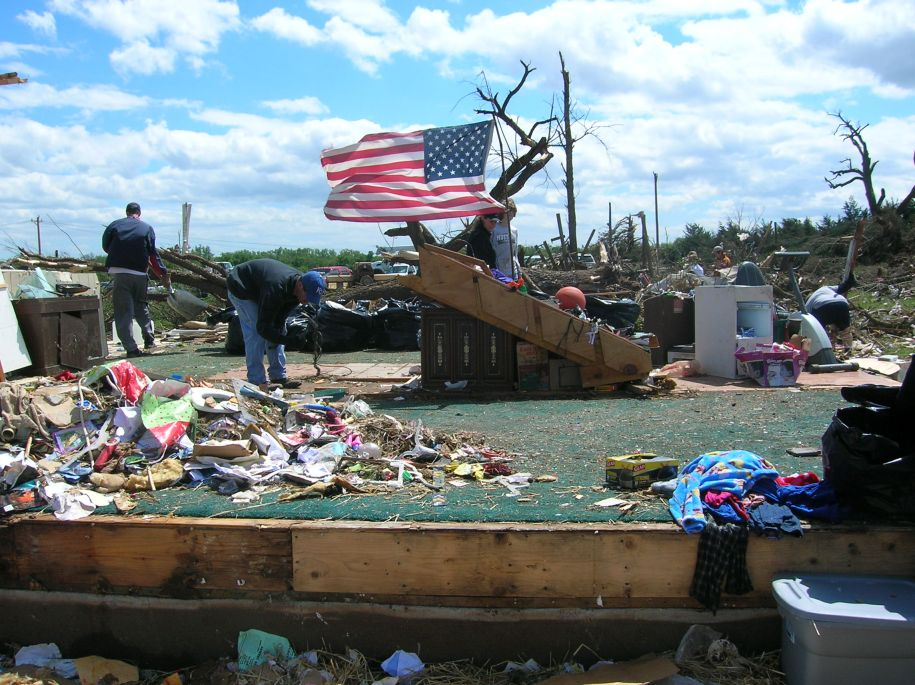
EF4 damage to a farm home near Kanopolis Lake.

Upon entering Ellsworth County at approximately 6:00 pm, south of the Kanopolis Lake area near Crawford, the tornado would parallel for most of its time the K-4 highway, located to the west of the tornado. Traversing a track 6.31 mi (10.15 km) in distance, the storm impacted one farmhouse just south of Kanopolis Lake and K-4 highway, near Langley. The violent tornado, now at EF4 intensity, completely leveled the home off its foundation, leaving only the staircase in the center of the residence behind in the process. A section of gravel road at the farm was scoured away at a depth of 4–5 in (10–13 cm) while nearby trees were snapped, shredded, and in some instances debarked by the intense winds with debris from the destroyed farmhouse strewn into a tree line to the northeast. A car was flipped and tossed upside down as well, before the tornado exited Ellsworth County at 6:09 pm.

Now in McPherson County, northwest of Marquette, the tornado abruptly weakened to EF0 intensity along its 1.67 mi (2.69 km) track in the extreme northwestern corner of the county, as trees were mainly damaged at this level of intensity. After spending 4 minutes within McPherson County, at 6:13 pm the storm left for neighboring Saline County. It entered through the southern portion, southwest of the Smoky Hills Weapons Range, or 8.94 mi (14.39 km) southwest of Falun. The tornado began to head more north-northeast at this point, heading right for regions west of the large city of Salina. In the city, a stop sign from the Kanopolis Lake area, was found 27 mi (43 km) from its origin point. Near Smolan, the tornado impacted one farmhouse and across parts of Saline County, major damage to trees was noted. The tornado along the 26.75 mi (43.05 km) path across the county, only at its strongest was at EF2 intensity. Southeast of Culver, the tornado would dissipate south of the Saline–Ottawa County line at 6:36 pm.

The long-track, violent tornado, tracked a distance 50.3 mi (81.0 km) long and 400 yd (0.23 mi; 0.37 km) wide. The tornado lasted for 1 hour and 3 minutes, and at its strongest caused EF4 damage at a farmstead in Ellsworth County. No injuries or fatalities were reported by this event. This was the first time a violent tornado occurred in the state of Kansas, since the EF4 tornado that struck Manhattan on June 11, 2008. It would be the last until 2016, as a long-lived and powerful EF4 tornado passed near areas of Chapman. This event would also be the final tornado rated EF4 during the 2012 season, with other violent tornadoes preceding it in Illinois, Indiana and Kentucky in February and March.

=== Greensburg–Macksville–St. John–Raymond, Kansas ===
Greensburg–Macksville–St. John–Raymond, Kansas
- The first EF3 tornado seen outside of Greensburg.

Meteorological history
- Formed: April 14, 2012, 8:27 pm CDT (UTC−05:00)
- Dissipated: April 14, 2012, 10:01 pm CDT (UTC−05:00)
- Duration: 1 hour, 34 minutes

Tornado family
- Tornadoes: 2 confirmed
- Max. rating: EF3 tornado
- Highest winds: 140 mph (230 km/h)

Satellite tornadoes
- Tornadoes: 2 confirmed
- Max. rating: EF1 tornado
- Highest winds: 86–110 mph (138–177 km/h)

Overall effects
- Fatalities: 0
- Injuries: 0

Confirmed tornadoes by Enhanced Fujita rating
EFU	EF0	EF1	EF2	EF3	EF4	EF5	Total
0	0	2	0	2	0	0	4

During the evening of April 14, a cyclical supercell produced a tornado family, predominantly consisting of two large and powerful tornadoes in southwest to central Kansas. The first one of what the National Weather Service in Dodge City, Kansas refers as the Big Two tornadoes, initially formed to the west of Greensburg, in west-central Kiowa County at 8:27 pm. The tornado was quoted by the National Weather Service as being "eerily similar" to the EF5 tornado that occurred prior on May 4, 2007, as well as even crossing the path of that particular tornado as it was northwest of the city.

Across a 12.12 mi (19.51 km) section in parts of northern Kiowa County, the tornado intensified to EF3 strength, as well as growing to 1,500 yd (0.85 mi; 1.4 km) wide. North of Greensburg, the intense tornado caused damage to farm outbuildings and machinery, areas with trees, power lines, and irrigation pivots. Approaching the county line with Edwards County, at 8:40 pm, an EF1 satellite tornado touched down on the eastern flank of the primary tornado. The secondary tornado caused minor damage to trees and a mobile home, before dissipating at 8:43 pm. Meanwhile, the tornado caused instances of ground scouring in fields south of the border before leaving the area one minute earlier, at 8:42 pm.

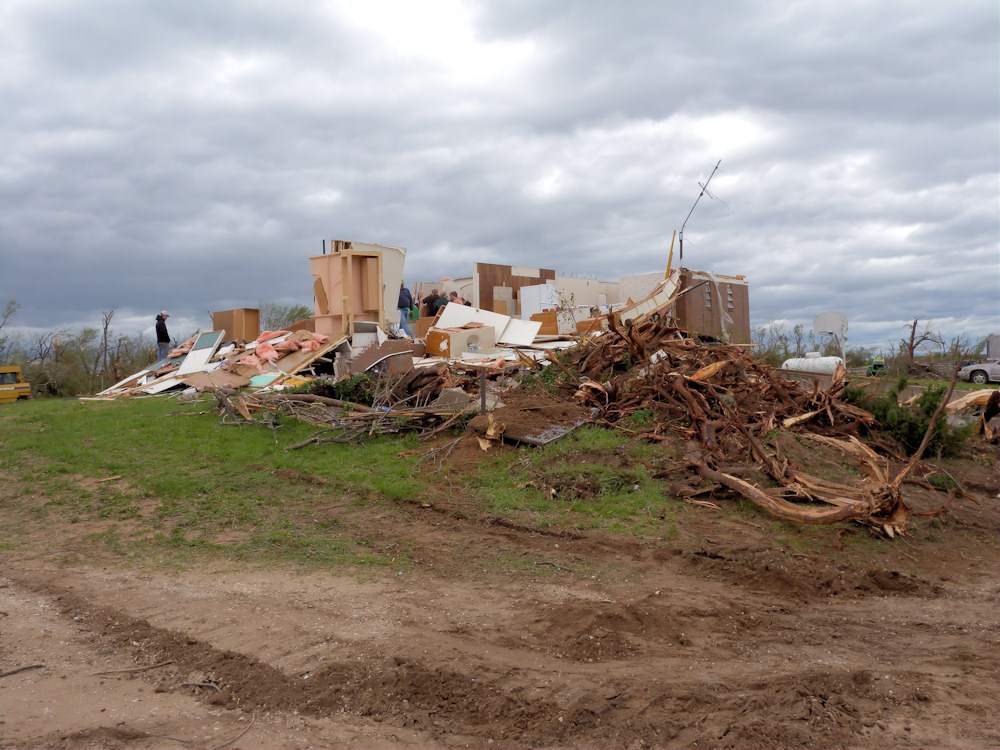
A farmhouse with its exterior walls collapsed.

Crossing over into Edwards County, 6.27 mi (10.09 km) south-southwest of Fellsburg, the tornado grew to 1,720 yd (0.98 mi; 1.57 km) wide as it tracked a 25.2 mi (40.6 km) path through the eastern portions of the county. In its wake, the storm caused EF3 damage to a farmhouse, as well as more trees, powerlines, and more farm machinery and outbuildings. In one wheat field, considerable ground scouring was noted to have occurred as it passed in between Fellsburg and Trousdale. Later, the tornado then entered Stafford County, 7.15 mi (11.51 km) south-southwest of Macksville at 9:01 pm, shifting a little more to the east as it began heading towards areas east of the city. Along the 10.7 mi (17.2 km) track across Stafford County, EF2 damage was noted, with such level of damage occurring to trees, irrigation pivot sprinklers and outbuildings. Being on the ground for 8 minutes afterwards, the first EF3 tornado dissipated 2.92 mi (4.70 km) west-northwest of Dillwyn at 9:10 pm.

Immediately after the occlusion of EF3 Fellsburg tornado, the parent storm put down an even larger tornado, the second of the Big Two, to the east of Macksville at 9:10 pm. The "monster" tornado rapidly widened in width and headed northeast, directly for St. John before abruptly making a more northern turn. The northern outskirts of St. John were impacted as the tornado continued north, before returning to a northeasterly course. Several farmsteads and rural homes were impacted as the tornado moved towards and passed east of Hudson. To the southeast of the main vortex, another instance of a satellite tornado, rated EF1 after damaging power poles and trees, touched down at 9:23 pm to the south of Hudson. The satellite only lasted for 7 minutes, before dissipating at 9:30 pm.

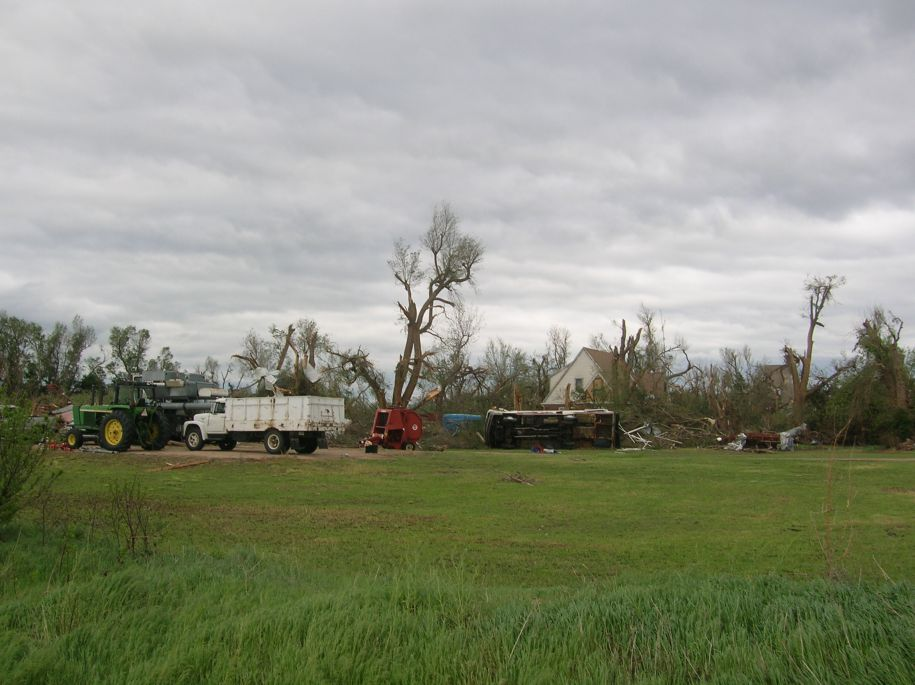
EF1 damage to a farmstead near Raymond.

The massive tornado, which already was 2,640 yd (1.50 mi; 2.41 km) wide, persisted as it headed northeast, before then encroaching into the Quivira National Wildlife Refuge. Afterwards, the tornado exited Stafford County and entered the western sections of Rice County at 9:45 pm. At this point, the tornado began to shrink in size and weaken, down both to 400 yd (0.23 mi; 0.37 km) and EF1 intensity, as it traversed past Raymond to the east. A large metal machine shed was destroyed, with sheet metal debris launched and wrapped around trees and fence posts. Windows at a nearby farmhouse were blown out, with a section of a metal fence tossed into the home's window. At approximately 10:01 pm, the second EF3 St. John tornado dissipated northeast of the Raymond, becoming the final lasting tornado of the family.

The four confirmed tornadoes, two pairs of EF1 and EF3 tornadoes, were spawned by this strong supercell thunderstorm. The first of the Big Two, the EF3 Fellsburg tornado, lasted for 43 minutes, traversed 48 mi (77 km) in distance and was 1,720 yd (0.98 mi; 1,570 m) wide at its largest. The second, and larger EF3 St. John tornado, was on the ground for 51 minutes, traveled a distance 39.67 mi (63.84 km) long and at its widest was 2,640 yd (1.50 mi; 2,410 m) at peak size. Both tornadoes had estimated winds of 140 mph (230 km/h). Despite the excessive tornadic activity and severe damage inflicted to rural areas, no injuries or fatalities were reported. The first EF3 tornado of the pair, which struck west and north of Greensburg, was one of the few significant (EF2+) tornadoes to occur in the vicinity of the impacted city in the years since the EF5 tornado in 2007. This included events such as on May 23, 2008 and May 18, 2025. The separate EF1 satellite tornadoes near Greensburg and Hudson, traveled 4.9 mi (7.9 km) and 6.6 mi (10.6 km) long, and 75 yd (69 m) to 150 yd (140 m) wide at their maximum widths, whilst also lasting 3 and 7 minutes respectively.

=== Haysville–McConnell Air Force Base–Wichita, Kansas ===
Haysville–McConnell Air Force Base–Wichita, Kansas
- The tornado shortly before entering Wichita.

Meteorological history
- Formed: April 14, 2012, 10:21 pm CDT (UTC−05:00)
- Dissipated: April 14, 2012, 10:42 pm CDT (UTC−05:00)
- Duration: 21 minutes

EF3 tornado
- on the Enhanced Fujita scale
- Highest winds: 136–165 mph (219–266 km/h)

Overall effects
- Fatalities: 0
- Injuries: 38
- Damage: $500 million (2012 USD)

Originating in the Texas Panhandle, the supercell thunderstorm that produced this destructive nighttime EF3 tornado had a history of producing tornadoes in Oklahoma as early as 6:15 pm. The cyclic supercell storm produced additional tornadoes as it continued into south-central Kansas, including an EF3 that passed near Argonia and Conway Springs. As the supercell moved into the Wichita metropolitan area, a tornado touched down in the southern part of Haysville, moving through the eastern part of town along a northeasterly path. Damage in Haysville ranged from EF0 to EF1 in intensity as homes sustained damage to roofs, windows, and garage doors. Trees were also downed, some of which landed on houses. Farther to the northeast, additional minor to moderate damage occurred as the tornado approached the southeastern city limits of Wichita. By this time, local news stations and storm spotters were reporting a large wedge tornado moving into southeastern Wichita, accompanied by numerous power flashes. Staff at the Wichita National Weather Service Weather Forecast Office on the western perimeter of the Wichita Mid-Continent Airport were forced to hand over responsibility for their County Warning Area to the National Weather Service office in Topeka and take shelter at about 10:00 pm CDT (0300 UTC), due to the close proximity of the predicted tornado track to their location. While within their shelter room, the NWS Wichita staff used a laptop computer and personal smartphones to continue to monitor the tornado on radar. The tornado ended up passing within six miles of the facility at its closest point, and the staff returned to duty half an hour later. The tornado reached EF3 intensity as it entered Wichita, tearing directly through the Oaklawn-Sunview neighborhood. Major damage occurred in this residential area, as numerous one-story homes were severely damaged or destroyed, including many that lost roofs and exterior walls. One home was leveled, and many large trees were snapped, defoliated, and denuded.

Series of radar images showing the entire life of the Wichita supercell.

Some of the most significant damage in this area occurred at the Pinaire Mobile Home Park, where 90 of the 150 mobile homes were damaged, several of which were completely destroyed. Ruptured gas lines in the mobile home park resulted in a fire, and several residents were left trapped in the rubble, but were later rescued. Despite the severity of the damage, no fatalities occurred at the Pinaire Mobile Home Park or anywhere else along the path of the tornado. Continuing to the northeast, the tornado weakened to EF2 strength and struck Spirit AeroSystems, Wichita's largest employer. Every building at the facility sustained some degree of damage, and six of the buildings sustained significant damage. One of these buildings was largely destroyed. At nearby McConnell Air Force Base, hangars and fences were heavily damaged, and airplanes were damaged at the Kansas Aviation Museum. Past McConnell Air Force Base, the tornado weakened to EF1 strength and passed near the intersection of Rock Road and East Pawnee Street, snapping power poles and toppling a billboard over onto a nearby building. Minor tree, fence, and house damage occurred in residential areas along this segment of the path, and an apartment building had a large portion of its roof torn off. At the East Harry Street and South Webb Road intersection, a QuikTrip, Dillons, Walgreens, and several other businesses sustained EF0 to EF1 damage. Continuing to the northeast, EF0 to EF1 damage continued as the tornado passed near the intersection of Greenwich Road and East Kellogg Avenue, blowing the windows out of vehicles at a car dealership and causing roof damage to the Hawker Beechcraft facility. A large ferris wheel was toppled over in the parking lot of Morningstar Community Church, where a fair had been taking place earlier in the day. Additional minor tree and house damage occurred before the tornado dissipated to the west of Andover, after injuring 38 people and causing $500 million in damage. The path of this tornado bore a striking resemblance to the track of an F5 tornado that killed 17 people in Sedgwick and Butler counties on April 26, 1991.

=== Arnett–Woodward, Oklahoma ===
Arnett–Woodward, Oklahoma
- The tornado seen just outside Woodward.

Meteorological history
- Formed: April 14, 2012, 11:42 pm CDT (UTC−05:00)
- Dissipated: April 15, 2012, 12:27 am CDT (UTC−05:00)
- Duration: 25 minutes

EF3 tornado
- on the Enhanced Fujita scale
- Highest winds: 165 mph (266 km/h)

Overall effects
- Fatalities: 6
- Injuries: 36
- Damage: $26 million (2012 USD)

Touching down 3 miles (4.8 km) northeast of Arnett in southern Ellis County, Oklahoma, at 11:42 p.m. CDT on April 14, this deadly EF3 nighttime tornado was the only tornado of the outbreak that resulted in any fatalities. After touching down, the tornado rapidly intensified and continued through sparsely populated areas to the northeast of Arnett, destroying two homes and causing lesser damage to a few others. Damage along this segment of the path was rated EF3. The tornado tracked northeastward into Woodward County, Oklahoma, around 11:59 p.m. CDT, producing EF2 damage. Power lines were downed and two mobile homes were completely destroyed to the southeast of Fargo, killing three people. Illuminated by lightning and power flashes, the large stovepipe tornado entered the southwestern part of Woodward at 12:19 a.m. CDT on April 15. The first area impacted in Woodward was a subdivision along Quail Drive and Meadowlake Drive. EF3 damage occurred in this areas as numerous homes were damaged or destroyed, some of which were left with only a few interior walls standing. Large trees were defoliated, snapped, and denuded, and vehicles were tossed and severely damaged. The tornado reached high-end EF3 strength as it moved through neighborhoods just to the west of 34th Street, where multiple homes had roofs ripped off and sustained collapse of exterior walls. One two-story home was completely flattened with only a pile of rubble left behind, though overall context was not indicative of a tornado exceeding high-end EF3 intensity. EF3 damage continued just beyond this point as one-story condominium buildings along Lakeside Lane were destroyed. One of the buildings at the complex was leveled, though the structures were not well-anchored to their foundations. A Carpet Direct store housed in a large retail building in this area also sustained EF3 damage, sustaining total roof loss and collapse of multiple exterior walls, with metal support beams bent. A nearby movie theater building was badly damaged as well.

High-End EF3 damage to homes in the southwestern part of Woodward, Oklahoma.

The tornado then crossed Oklahoma Avenue, snapping trees and bending metal street signs to the ground. The Mutual of Omaha Customer Service Center, housed in a large and well-built office building, was impacted at low-end EF3 intensity. The structure sustained many blown out windows, roof loss, major damage to its interior, and partial exterior wall failure. Large amounts of debris was scattered throughout the area, and small ornamental trees on the property sustained some debarking. Farther to the northeast, the tornado maintained its strength as it ripped through residential areas in western Woodward, severely damaging or completely destroying many homes in the vicinity of Cheyenne Drive, Choctaw Court, and Ridgecrest Avenue. Past this area, the tornado struck the Hideaway Mobile Home Park along 26th Street in the northwestern part of town, resulting in devastating damage. Three people were killed as several mobile homes were obliterated, with their metal frames thrown and mangled. Debris was scattered in all directions, vehicles were tossed, and ground scouring was noted at the mobile home park. The tornado then exited Woodward and weakened, moving through open country before lifting at around 12:27 a.m. CDT approximately 4 miles (6.4 km) northeast of Woodward in northwestern Woodward County. 89 homes and 13 businesses were reportedly damaged or destroyed in Woodward, including 10 houses that were leveled. 6 people were killed by the tornado, and 28 others were injured.

The 20 outdoor warning sirens located throughout Woodward did not sound prior to the tornado striking the town. This was due to lightning strike damage from the previous day sustained to a tower used to activate the local electricity-powered siren warning system. As a result, most Woodward area residents had to rely on warnings either from local television stations broadcasting from the Oklahoma City market through cable and satellite television or NOAA Weather Radio All Hazards.

This was the strongest tornado to strike Woodward since an F5 tornado, which killed 107 people in the town on April 9, 1947.

== Aftermath ==
On April 15, 2012, Kansas Governor Sam Brownback declared a state of emergency for the entire state due to the tornadoes, straight-line winds, hail and flash flooding. Oklahoma Governor Mary Fallin declared a state of emergency the following day on April 16 for twelve Oklahoma counties (Alfalfa, Caddo, Canadian, Cleveland, Ellis, Harper, Jackson, Kiowa, Logan, Oklahoma, Woods and Woodward).

On April 18, Fallin filed a federal disaster declaration request for Woodward County with the Federal Emergency Management Agency, seeking government funding to provide temporary housing, low-interest loans, disaster unemployment assistance and disaster expense grants for people and businesses affected by the storms; officials for the Governor's office stated that if the request is granted, additional Oklahoma counties currently included in the state of emergency declaration may be added to the federal disaster declaration.

On April 19, 2012, FEMA announced that the southwestern Iowa counties of Union and Fremont that were also affected by the tornadoes would not qualify for federal assistance, both counties also received state disaster declarations by Governor Terry Branstad. FEMA denied the disaster declaration request for the twelve Oklahoma counties the following day on April 20. The Small Business Administration accepted a separate disaster declaration request filed by Governor Fallin for Woodward County on April 26; the declaration will allow the SBA to provide low-interest disaster loans for renters, homeowners, business owners and non-profits to repair or replace storm-damaged property not covered by insurance or other federal assistance programs.

== See also ==
- List of North American tornadoes and tornado outbreaks
