= K-141 (Kansas highway) =

State highway in Kansas, U.S.

K-141
- K-141 highlighted in red

Route information
- Maintained by KDOT
- Length: 13.47 mi (21.68 km)
- Existed: August 16, 1955–present
- Tourist routes: Prairie Trail Scenic Byway

Major junctions
- South end: K-4 about 7 miles (11 km) west of Marquette
- North end: K-140 about 3.4 miles (5.5 km) east of Carneiro

Location
- Country: United States
- State: Kansas
- Counties: Ellsworth

Highway system
- Kansas State Highway System; Interstate; US; State; Spurs
| ← K-140 | → K-143 |

K-141 is a 13.47-mile-long (21.68 km) north–south state highway in Ellsworth County in central Kansas. The highway connects K-4 west of Marquette and K-140 northeast of Carneiro with Kanopolis Lake. The entire length of K-141 is a part of the Prairie Trail Scenic Byway, which was designated to highlight the history, culture, and nature of the area. The highway is a two-lane road its entire length.

Before state highways were numbered in Kansas, there were auto trails. The northern terminus follows the former Golden Belt. On August 16, 1955, K-141 was designated as a state highway. Between 1961 and 1963, the alignment was straightened and realigned to cross the Kanopolis Dam. On October 13, 1967, U.S. Route 40 (US-40) was rerouted onto Interstate 70 (I-70) from Dorrance to Salina. At that time K-141 was extended from its northern terminus eastward along old US-40 to Salina. This extension was brief because on November 27, 1968, old US-40 from Ellsworth eastward to Salina was designated K-140 and K-141 was truncated to end at the new K-140, its original northern terminus.

== Route description ==
K-141 is a north–south route with a total length of 13.47 miles (21.68 km). The entire route travels primarily through rural grassland. The entire length of K-141 is a section of the Prairie Trail Scenic Byway, which runs from Canton to the northern terminus of K-141.

The highway's southern terminus is at K-4 west of the city of Marquette. From there, the highway heads north for about 2.25 miles (3.62 km) through rural farmlands before curving slightly in a north-northwest direction. K-141 continues 0.3 miles (0.48 km) then intersects Langley Point Road, which connects the highway to South Shore State Park. The highway begins to travel along the top of Kanopolis Dam. Immediately after crossing the dam, the highway curve slightly northwest before gently turning back to a northerly direction as it passes the unincorporated community of Venango. K-141 continues traveling in a northward direction through small rolling hills covered with a mix of grasslands and farmlands for 2.9 miles (4.7 km) then shifts slightly west. The highway continues for about 2.9 miles (4.7 km) then veers to the northeast and crosses over Spring Creek and Union Pacific Railroad tracks. K-141 then turns back north and reaches its northern terminus at K-140 northeast of the unincorporated community of Carneiro.

The Kansas Department of Transportation (KDOT) tracks the traffic levels on its highways, and in 2019, they determined that on average the traffic varied from 505 vehicles per day slightly north of the southern terminus to 530 vehicles per day near the intersection of Avenue M. K-141 is not included in the National Highway System. (Note: The National Highway System is a system of highways important to the nation's defense, economy, and mobility.) From the southern terminus northward five miles (8.0 km) it is paved with full design bituminous pavement, the next five miles (8.0 km) is paved with partial design bituminous pavement and the final 3.47 miles (5.58 km) is paved with full design bituminous pavement.

== History ==
=== Early roads and establishment ===
Before state highways were numbered in Kansas there were auto trails, which were an informal network of marked routes that existed in the United States and Canada in the early part of the 20th century. The northern terminus follows the former Golden Belt, an auto trail that went from Denver east to Kansas City. Slightly south of the southern terminus was the route of the former Bee Line, an auto trail that went from Scott City east to Herington.

On October 6, 1954, the Kansas State Highway Commission (SHC), now known as KDOT, passed a resolution to make Kanopolis Lake Road a state highway as soon as Ellsworth County had brought it up to state highway standards. Then in a resolution on August 16, 1955, it was designated K-141 as the county had finished required projects. When first established the highway turned east onto Avenue T, southeast of the Kanopolis Lake Dam. After about 0.5 miles (0.80 km) it turned north at and began to follow 29th Road. It then turned east onto Avenue R then north onto 30th Road 0.5 miles (0.80 km) later. It then curved west onto Avenue M then met its current alignment about two miles (3.2 km) later.

=== Realignment ===
In July 1958, the state park director requested that K-141 should be relocated further west to better serve Kanopolis State Park. The SHC immediately directed their staff to begin surveys and a feasibility study. On November 23, 1959, the SHC authorized right-of-way acquisition for a four-mile-long (6.4 km) section of the reroute from Kanopolis Lake dam north, as well as a 0.8-mile-long (1.3 km) section of K-241. On December 24, 1959, the last of three surveys was started on the section from the dam north to US-40, and was expected to be completed by January 15, 1960. In October 1960, bids were accepted on the section from the dam northward 4.1 miles (6.6 km). By late January 1961, culverts were being installed on the new alignment of K-141. The section from the dam northward roughly 4.1 miles (6.6 km) was completed in late 1961.

On March 8, 1962, bids were taken on the section from the north end of the dam south to K-4. In early May 1962, a work order was issued for the section over the dam and south to K-4. Martin and Ade Incorporated of Gypsum got the contract for grading at a cost of $122,597.58 (equivalent to $1.31 million in 2025), and Russell Ralph Company Incorporated of Topeka got the contract for building the bridge at a cost of $42,522.39 (equivalent to $453,000 in 2025). The dam was widened 11 feet (3.4 m) to support the new road. On June 7, 1962, bids were taken for the section from US-40 south 3.8 miles (6.1 km). At the end of June 1962, the work order was issued on that section from US-40 south. Martin and Ade Incorporated of Gypsum was awarded the grading contract at a cost of $113,669.96 (equivalent to $1.21 million in 2025), and Ralph W. Forkner Construction Company of Clay Center was awarded the contract for a bridge over the railroad at a cost of $75,726.60 (equivalent to $806,000 in 2025).

By the end of December 1962, the section over the dam was almost completed, as well as an additional nine miles (14 km) of the new alignment. In September 1962, a work order was issued to pave the new section from K-4 northward 5.6 miles (9.0 km). San-Ore Construction Company of McPherson completed the surfacing at a cost of $254,366.70 (equivalent to $2.71 million in 2025). In early June 1963, a work order was issued on the final surfacing project on the section from US-40 southward four miles (6.4 km). San-Ore Construction Company of McPherson completed the surfacing at a cost of $146,432.50 (equivalent to $1.54 million in 2025). The new route was constructed with a bridge over the Union Pacific Railroad track, which eliminated the former at-grade crossing. The new alignment also moved the junction with US-40 slightly east.

=== Temporary extension ===
By 1965, I-70 was extended west from Salina to Dorrance. On October 13, 1967, US-40 was rerouted to overlap the newly constructed section of I-70 from Dorrance to Salina. At that time, K-141 was extended from its northern terminus eastward along old US-40 to Salina. The former alignment of US-40 from Ellsworth to Salina was designated as K-140 on November 27, 1968, while K-141 was truncated to its original northern terminus (now at K-140).

== Major intersections ==
The entire route is in Ellsworth County.

| Location | mi | km | Destinations | Notes |
|---|---|---|---|---|
| Langley Township | 0.00 | 0.00 | K-4 – Lindsborg, Hoisington | Southern terminus; road continues unpaved as 29th Road |
| Carneiro Township | 13.47 | 21.68 | K-140 – Ellsworth | Northern terminus; former US-40 |
1.000 mi = 1.609 km; 1.000 km = 0.621 mi
