= Yankee Run, Kansas =

Unincorporated community in Ellsworth County, Kansas

- Unincorporated community
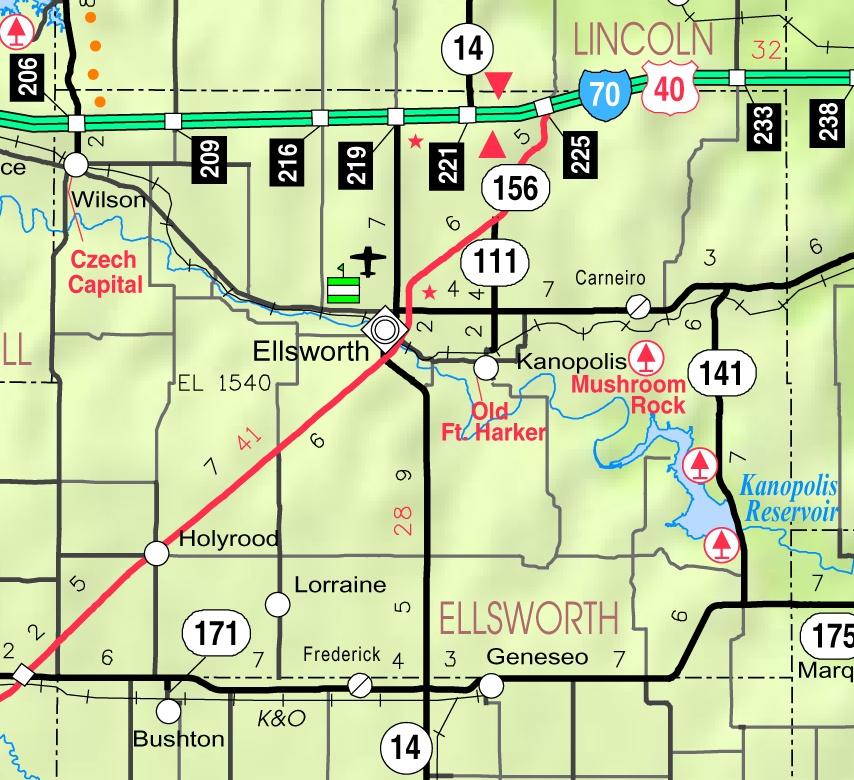
- KDOT map of Ellsworth County (legend)

- Location within the state of Kansas Yankee Run (the United States)
- Coordinates: 38°39′05″N 98°01′01″W
- Country: United States
- State: Kansas
- County: Ellsworth
- Elevation: 1,522 ft (464 m)
- Time zone: UTC-6 (CST)
  - Summer (DST): UTC-5 (CDT)
- Area code: 785
- GNIS ID: 475473

Yankee Run is an unincorporated community in Ellsworth County, Kansas, United States. It is located on the west bank of the Kanopolis Lake.

== Education ==
The community is served by Ellsworth USD 327 public school district.

== See also ==
- Kanopolis Lake
- Kanopolis State Park
- Mushroom Rock State Park
- Venango, Kansas, located on east bank of Kanopolis Lake
