= Kanopolis, Kansas =

City in Ellsworth County, Kansas

- City
- Welcome sign and water tower in Kanopolis (2026)

- Location within County and Kansas

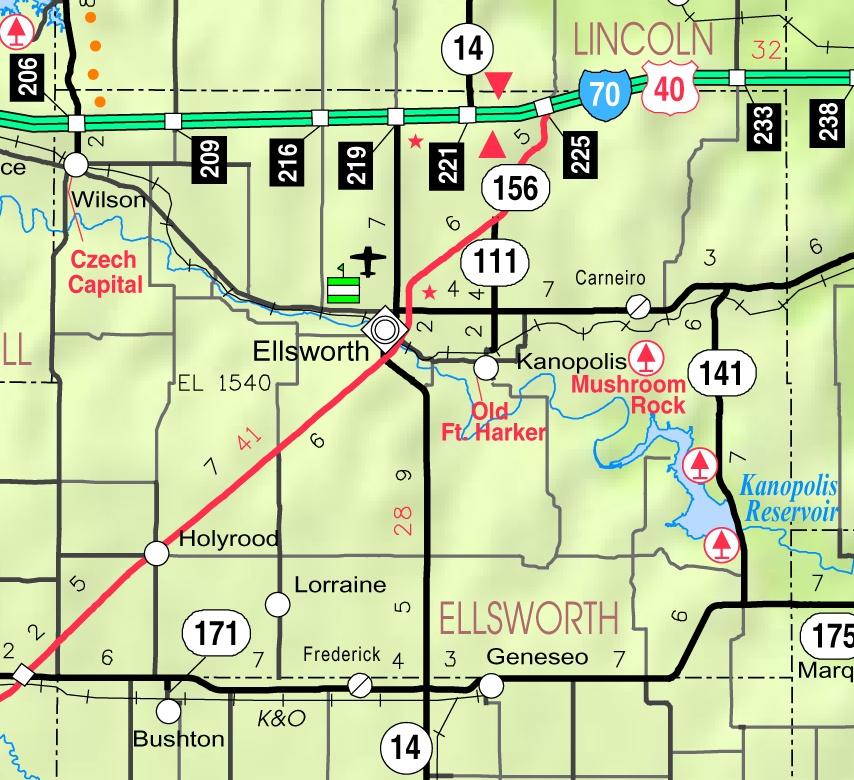
- KDOT map of Ellsworth County (legend)
- Coordinates: 38°42′29″N 98°09′29″W
- Country: United States
- State: Kansas
- County: Ellsworth
- Founded: 1880s
- Incorporated: 1887

Government
  - Type: Mayor–Council
  - Mayor: Anthony Hopkins

Area
  - Total: 1.18 sq mi (3.05 km^{2})
  - Land: 1.18 sq mi (3.05 km^{2})
  - Water: 0 sq mi (0.00 km^{2})
- Elevation: 1,578 ft (481 m)

Population (2020)
  - Total: 443
  - Density: 376/sq mi (145/km^{2})
- Time zone: UTC-6 (CST)
  - Summer (DST): UTC-5 (CDT)
- ZIP Code: 67454
- Area code: 785
- FIPS code: 20-35950
- GNIS ID: 2395490
- Website: www.kanopolisks.net

Kanopolis is a city in Ellsworth County, Kansas, United States. As of the 2020 census, the population of the city was 443. It was built on the site of Fort Harker, a United States Army post that housed infantry and cavalry troops involved in the Indian Wars from 1867 to 1872.

== History ==
=== Early history ===
For millennia, the Great Plains of North America were inhabited by nomadic Native Americans. From the 16th to 18th centuries, the Kingdom of France claimed ownership of large parts of North America. In 1762, after the French and Indian War, France secretly ceded New France to Spain, by the Treaty of Fontainebleau. In 1802, Spain returned most of the land to France, keeping title to about 7,500 square miles. In 1803, most of the land for modern day Kansas was acquired by the United States from France as part of the 828,000 square mile Louisiana Purchase. In 1854, the Kansas Territory was organized under the provisions of the Kansas–Nebraska Act, then in 1861 Kansas became the 34th U.S. state. In 1867, Ellsworth County was established, which included the land for Kanopolis.

=== Pre-Kanopolis ===
Fort Ellsworth was the first frontier fort established in the Kanopolis area. It was built by the United States Army in August 1864 at the junction of the Fort Riley-Fort Larned Road and the Smoky Hill Trail, near the Smoky Hill River. Its purpose was to protect construction of the Union Pacific railroad from Native American raids. In November, 1866 Fort Ellsworth changed its name to Fort Harker after the death of General G.H. Charles Harker, who was killed in battle in 1864.

By this time, the fort had grown in importance as a military staging post and supply depot for forts further west, and needed to expand to continue meeting its mission. As a result, on November 17, 1866, the Army ordered the construction of a new fort approximately three-quarters mile east of the current location. The original Fort Ellsworth was closed in early 1867, and the community of Ellsworth was founded in its place.

In January 1867, Fort Harker was relocated approximately three-quarters mile east of the old location to an open prairie about one mile north of the Smoky Hill River. This new location featured a "large, well-equipped" hospital," which housed those were ill. The hospital was surely busy, as about 200 people died in 1867 from cholera in and around the Fort Harker area. For the next five years, Fort Harker became one of the most important military stations west of the Missouri River.[cite the Guardhouse national register nomination] It used 700 soldiers and twice as many civilian employees, as well as 400 horses and mules. Additionally, the mail to all military posts down the Arkansas river, as well as many posts in Colorado and New Mexico, was supplied from Fort Harker.

Over the coming years, the threat of Native American raids in the region diminished as territory was secured and railroad construction moved west. No longer of geographic significance, Fort Harker was abandoned on April 2, 1872 and the war department ordered it to be closed shortly thereafter. Its garrison was relocated west to Fort Hays. In the winter of 1872-1873, Fort Harker briefly stationed troops once more before being deserted one final time. In the following years, Fort Harker became the "Fort Harker Military Reservation".

=== Kanopolis begins ===
In June 1880, the Senate passed bill S.194, an act disposing Fort Harker Military Reservation of public ownership and giving the 10,240-acre tract of land to the Interior Department for sale. A Dr. Hodge acquired the land and sold it to Col. Henry Johnson for $4,177.50 in August, 1881. In summer of 1885, a seventeen-member group of capitalists based in Ohio led by Ross Mitchell (president), F.M. Bookwalter (vice president), and John H. Thomas (treasurer) purchased 4,740 acres of the land, including Fort Harker and its buildings, for $71,000 from Col. Johnson. Imagining their newly acquired land would soon become a "Central Metropolis," and a future capitol because of its location, the group became chartered as the Kanopolis Land Company on March 15, 1886, with a capital stock of $500,000. They laid out land for 150,000 people, and shortly after, the town of Kanopolis was founded.

=== Optimism and boosterism ===
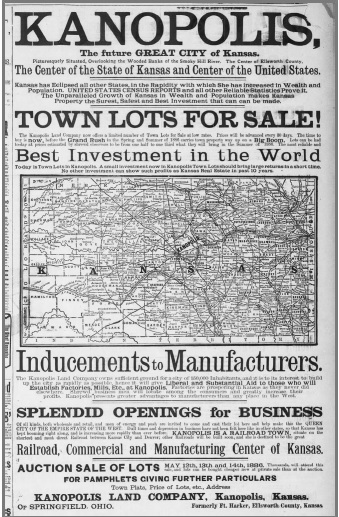
A Kanopolis advertisement in The Lawrence Journal, May 1886

The Kanopolis Land Co., with editor R.V. Morgan, advertised in other newspapers and in a paper of their own called The Kanopolis Journal to attract buyers to Kanopolis. These advertisements serve as examples of the boosterism characteristic of the frontier west. One from May 1886 proclaimed Kanopolis "is destined to be the railroad, commercial, and manufacturing capital of Kansas" and said buying land in Kanopolis is the "Best investment in the world." Another in July 1887 declared it to be the only town in the state with railroads running north, south, east, and west and also claimed to have seven factories, thirteen stores, and a hotel. It reported the population to be 600 when the town was "scarcely" one year old.

More hyperbolic than the advertisements in other newspapers was The Kanopolis Journal. It boasted Kanopolis to have "woolen mills, iron factories, carriage works, flour mills, wholesale houses, banks, a drug store, and an opera house, doctors, and machine shops," as well as a brewery. Additionally, the journal predicts Kanopolis would soon be the furniture hub of the midwest, saying it "is not one-half the distance from a limitless supply of walnut, oak, ash, poplar and all lumber needed in the manufacture of furniture as is Grand Rapids, Michigan, which owes its prosperity to the furniture business." It said that in forty years it will have 500,000 inhabitants, as it had already "grown as populous as Cincinnati did in eleven years or Cleveland did in thirty years." The journal also describes giant potatoes, cabbage leaves that "are used for circus tents," jack rabbits that "grow as large as horses," and pea pods that "are used as ferry boats on the Arkansas river." It also claims "A man planted a turnip one mile from the railroad last summer and the company sued him for obstructing the track before the middle of July." Additionally, the journal says that "North of Kanopolis are several lakes of strained honey, and we also often have showers of rosewater and cologne in the early spring." The journal even says the area around Kanopolis is the real garden of Eden, and that there is a fig tree that Eve herself used to make her first clothes, and that the tree is "like our flag - it is still there, and furnishes evidence which our oldest inhabitants dare not dispute.... This settlement of Western Kansas is restoring Eden to its primitive glory and men to their first estate."

=== Shy of expectations ===
Kanopolis, for a variety of reasons, never became the "Queen City of the Midwest" that its backers "ballyhooed" it would become. Perhaps its biggest injury was when it lost a referendum by 75 votes to become the seat of Ellsworth County. Also, it had some contemporary antagonists. An editorial in a January 1887 paper from the Leavenworth Times calls Kanopolis a "buffalo wallow," a "scheme," and a "fraud" from an "eastern syndicate". A lawsuit between the Kanopolis Land Co. and R.V. Morgan in 1895 ensued, likely detracting from the company's ability to advertise and sell land. By 1906, Kanopolis' population had fallen to 264.

== Geography ==
According to the United States Census Bureau, the city has a total area of 1.20 square miles (3.11 km^{2}), all land.

=== Climate ===
The climate in this area is characterized by hot, humid summers and generally mild to cool winters. According to the Köppen Climate Classification system, Kanopolis has a humid subtropical climate, abbreviated "Cfa" on climate maps.

== Demographics ==
Historical population
Census	Pop.	Note	%±
1890	272		—
1900	240		−11.8%
1910	577		140.4%
1920	762		32.1%
1930	860		12.9%
1940	868		0.9%
1950	743		−14.4%
1960	732		−1.5%
1970	626		−14.5%
1980	729		16.5%
1990	605		−17.0%
2000	543		−10.2%
2010	492		−9.4%
2020	443		−10.0%
U.S. Decennial Census

=== 2020 census ===
The 2020 United States census counted 443 people, 205 households, and 111 families in Kanopolis. The population density was 376.1 per square mile (145.2/km^{2}). There were 255 housing units at an average density of 216.5 per square mile (83.6/km^{2}). The racial makeup was 92.1% (408) white or European American (88.94% non-Hispanic white), 0.0% (0) black or African-American, 0.9% (4) Native American or Alaska Native, 0.9% (4) Asian, 0.0% (0) Pacific Islander or Native Hawaiian, 2.26% (10) from other races, and 3.84% (17) from two or more races. Hispanic or Latino of any race was 9.03% (40) of the population.

Of the 205 households, 20.0% had children under the age of 18; 42.9% were married couples living together; 29.8% had a female householder with no spouse or partner present. 42.4% of households consisted of individuals and 20.0% had someone living alone who was 65 years of age or older. The average household size was 1.9 and the average family size was 2.5. The percent of those with a bachelor's degree or higher was estimated to be 14.7% of the population.

24.4% of the population was under the age of 18, 2.9% from 18 to 24, 20.1% from 25 to 44, 26.9% from 45 to 64, and 25.7% who were 65 years of age or older. The median age was 47.9 years. For every 100 females, there were 111.0 males. For every 100 females ages 18 and older, there were 106.8 males.

The 2016–2020 5-year American Community Survey estimates show that the median household income was $46,250 (with a margin of error of +/- $5,530) and the median family income was $51,944 (+/- $12,652). Males had a median income of $42,500 (+/- $7,614) versus $32,500 (+/- $5,756) for females. The median income for those above 16 years old was $37,667 (+/- $4,016). Approximately, 8.2% of families and 13.9% of the population were below the poverty line, including 34.9% of those under the age of 18 and 6.6% of those ages 65 or over.

=== 2010 census ===
As of the census of 2010, there were 492 people, 235 households, and 151 families residing in the city. The population density was 410.0 inhabitants per square mile (158.3/km^{2}). There were 273 housing units at an average density of 227.5 per square mile (87.8/km^{2}). The racial makeup of the city was 94.5% White, 1.2% Native American, 0.6% from other races, and 3.7% from two or more races. Hispanic or Latino of any race were 10.4% of the population.

There were 235 households, of which 20.4% had children under the age of 18 living with them, 50.6% were married couples living together, 7.2% had a female householder with no husband present, 6.4% had a male householder with no wife present, and 35.7% were non-families. 34.0% of all households were made up of individuals, and 15.4% had someone living alone who was 65 years of age or older. The average household size was 2.09 and the average family size was 2.58.

The median age in the city was 48.7 years. 16.7% of residents were under the age of 18; 7.8% were between the ages of 18 and 24; 19.9% were from 25 to 44; 34.8% were from 45 to 64; and 20.7% were 65 years of age or older. The gender makeup of the city was 51.8% male and 48.2% female.

== Economics ==
Independent Salt Company is located over a mile northeast of Kanopolis.

== Government ==
The Kanopolis government consists of a mayor and five council members. The council meets the 2nd Tuesday of each month at 7PM.

- City Hall, 119 N Kansas.

== Education ==
The community is served by Ellsworth USD 327 public school district. The district high school is located in Ellsworth. The Ellsworth High School mascots are the Ellsworth Bearcats.

Kanopolis High School was closed in school unification. The Kanopolis High School mascot was Kanopolis Bulldogs.

== Parks and recreation ==
- Kanopolis Lake and Kanopolis State Park
- Mushroom Rock State Park
- Faris Caves
- Kanopolis Drive-in Theatre
