= K-140 (Kansas highway) =

State highway in Kansas, U.S.

K-140
- K-140 highlighted in red

Route information
- Maintained by KDOT
- Length: 33.224 mi (53.469 km)

Major junctions
- West end: K-14 in Ellsworth
- K-156 in Ellsworth; K-111 north of Kanopolis; K-141 in eastern Ellsworth County
- East end: I-135 / US-81 in Salina

Location
- Country: United States
- State: Kansas
- Counties: Ellsworth, Saline

Highway system
- Kansas State Highway System; Interstate; US; State; Spurs
← K-139	→ K-141

K-140 is a 33.224-mile-long (53.469 km) state highway in Ellsworth and Saline Counties in the U.S. state of Kansas. The highway travels through mostly rural land between the cities of Ellsworth and Salina. In addition to connecting Ellsworth and Salina, K-140 travels through the communities of Carneiro, Brookville, and Bavaria. The highway has junctions with Kansas state highways K-14, K-156, K-111, and K-141, as well as Interstate 135 (I-135).

The route was originally established as U.S. Route 40 (US-40) and was redesignated K-140 after US-40 was made concurrent with I-70. K-140 is not a part of the United States National Highway System, and the entire route is paved with composite pavement. The western part of the highway is less traveled than the eastern part, with annual average daily traffic between 590 and 940 west of Brookville and between 700 and 1,200 east of Brookville.

== Route description ==
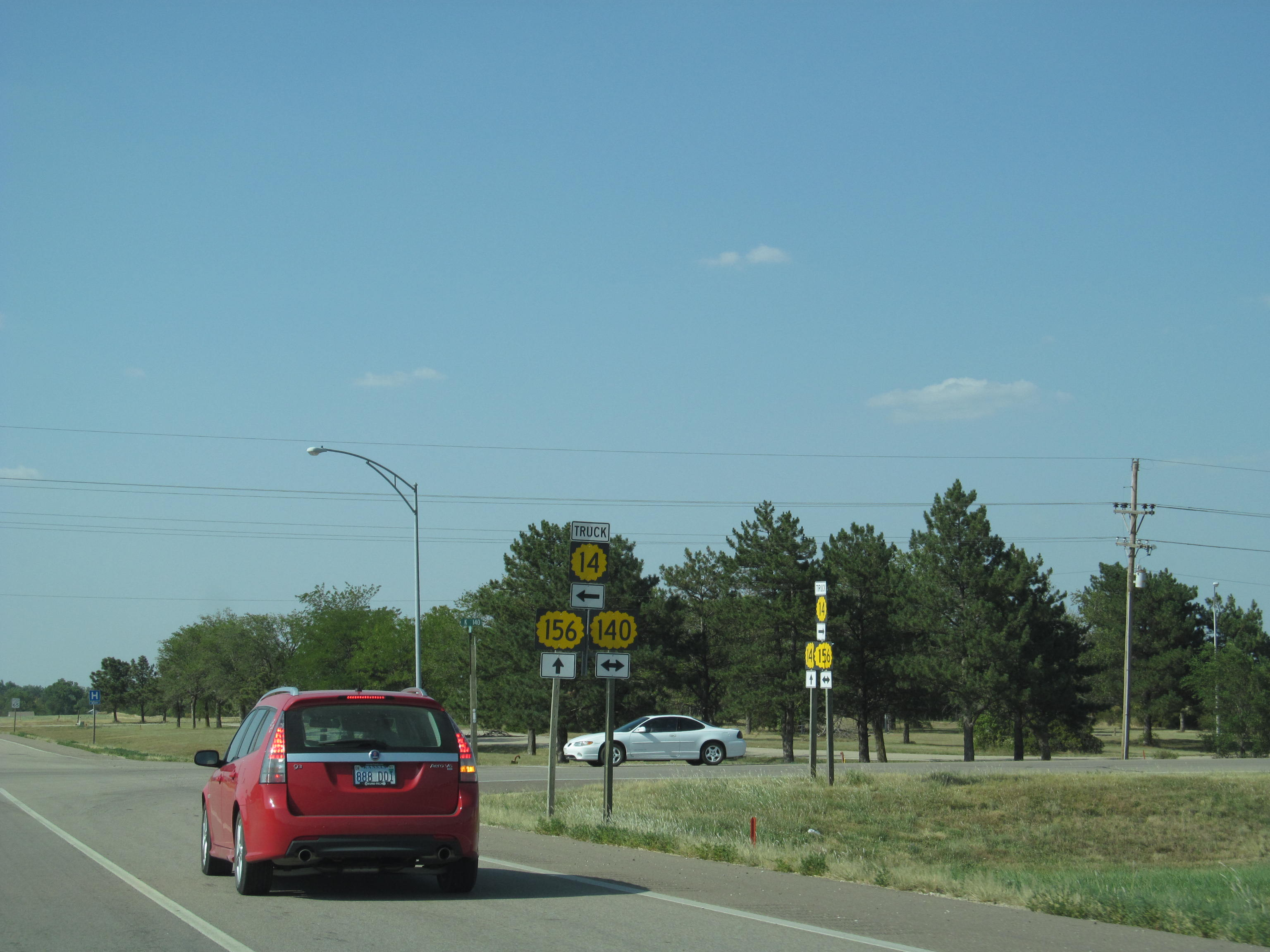
K-140 junction with K-156

K-140 begins at a junction with K-14 and the northern terminus of K-14 Truck north of Ellsworth. K-140 and K-14 Truck head 0.495 miles (0.797 km) due east from here to meet K-156, where K-14 Truck leaves and follows K-156 westbound. It then travels a farther 3.519 miles (5.663 km) through mostly rural land to a junction with K-111 north of Kanopolis. After the junction with K-111, K-140 continues through rural areas before it goes through the small unincorporated community of Carneiro. Just after passing through Carneiro K-140 turns more northerly, again passing through mostly rural areas. It then serves as the northern terminus of K-141 before continuing eastward into Saline County. K-140 travels a total of 16.455 miles (26.482 km) in Ellsworth County.

Entering Saline County K-140 travels in a general east-northeast direction through rural land for 3.246 miles (5.224 km) until entering Brookville. After traveling one mile (1.6 km) through the city of Brookville, K-140 travels east then northeast to the unincorporated community of Bavaria. From there, the highway continues northeast through rural lands to its eastern terminus at Interstate 135, with the road continuing east into the city of Salina as State Street. K-140 travels a total of 16.769 miles (26.987 km) in Saline County. The total route length for K-140 is 33.224 miles (53.469 km).

The entire route is paved with composite pavement (concrete which has been overlaid with asphaltic pavement). K-140 is not a part of the United States National Highway System. The route connects to the National Highway System at its junctions with K-156 and Interstate 135. From the eastern city limits of Ellsworth to the end of the first 1 mile (1.6 km) of the route, K-140 has an annual average daily traffic of 781 vehicles per day. Between miles 1 and 5 (kilometers 1.6 and 8.0), the annual average daily traffic ranges from 730 to 745 vehicles per day. From mile 5 (kilometer 8.0) to mile 14 (kilometer 23) the annual average daily traffic drops to between 590 and 650 vehicles per day. The amount of traffic then starts to rise as the highway crosses into Saline County, with annual average daily traffic ranging between 815 and 940 vehicles per day from mile 14 (kilometer 23) to the western city limits of Brookville. From Brookville to mile 30.445 (kilometer 48.996) the annual average daily traffic is higher, with a range between 1131 and 1200 vehicles per day. From there to the eastern terminus at Interstate 135 traffic levels vary widely, with annual average daily traffic ranging from 700 to 1193 vehicles per day.

== History ==
K-140's route was established in 1925 as US-40S. By 1936, the route had become the primary route of US-40, with the old US-40N becoming US-24. On October 13, 1967, US-40 was rerouted to overlap the newly constructed section of I-70 from Dorrance to Salina. At that time K-141 was extended from its northern terminus eastward along old US-40 to Salina. This extension was brief because on November 27, 1968, old US-40 from Ellsworth eastward to Salina was designated K-140 and K-141 was truncated to end at the new K-140, its original northern terminus. The routing of K-140 has remained unchanged since. The K-140 route has been a paved road since at least 1932.

== Major intersections ==
County	Location	mi	km	Destinations	Notes
Ellsworth	Ellsworth	0.000	0.000	K-14 Truck begins / K-14 – Ellsworth, Lincoln	Western terminus; northern terminus of K-14 Truck; west end of K-14 Truck concurrency; road continues as 15th Street
Ellsworth	Ellsworth	0.495	0.797	K-14 Truck south / K-156 – Great Bend	East end of K-14 Truck concurrency
Ellsworth		4.014	6.460	K-111 to K-156 – Kanopolis	
Ellsworth		13.931	22.420	K-141 south	Northern terminus of K-141
Saline		33.224	53.469	I-135 / US-81 – Wichita	Eastern terminus; interchange; I-135 exit 93; road continues as State Street
1.000 mi = 1.609 km; 1.000 km = 0.621 mi: Concurrency terminus
