= Langley, Kansas =

Unincorporated community in Ellsworth County, Kansas

- Unincorporated community
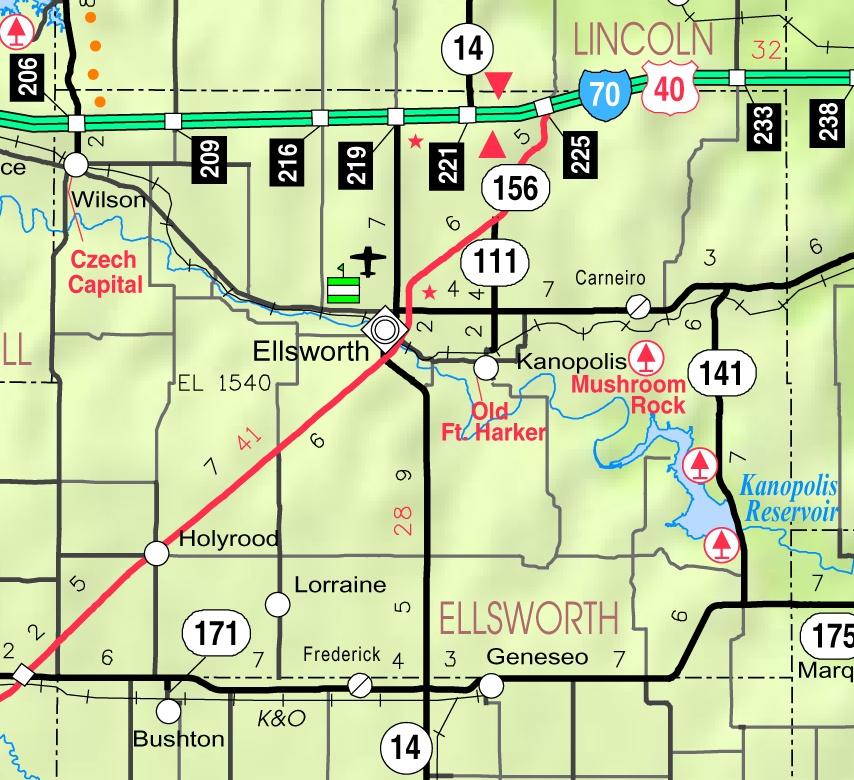
- KDOT map of Ellsworth County (legend)

- Location within the state of Kansas Langley (the United States)
- Coordinates: 38°32′48″N 97°57′46″W
- Country: United States
- State: Kansas
- County: Ellsworth
- Elevation: 1,516 ft (462 m)
- Time zone: UTC-6 (CST)
  - Summer (DST): UTC-5 (CDT)
- Area code: 785
- FIPS code: 20-38575
- GNIS ID: 477049

Langley is an unincorporated community in Ellsworth County, Kansas, United States. It is located approximately 4 miles (6.4 km) south of Kanopolis Lake.

== History ==
A post office was opened in Langley in 1887, and remained in operation until it was discontinued in 1953.

== Education ==
The community is served by Smoky Valley USD 400 public school district.

== See also ==
- Kanopolis Lake
- Kanopolis State Park
- Mushroom Rock State Park
