= Carneiro, Kansas =

Unincorporated community in Ellsworth County, Kansas

- Unincorporated community
- The former Carneiro School, open from 1916 to 1960, pictured in 2026

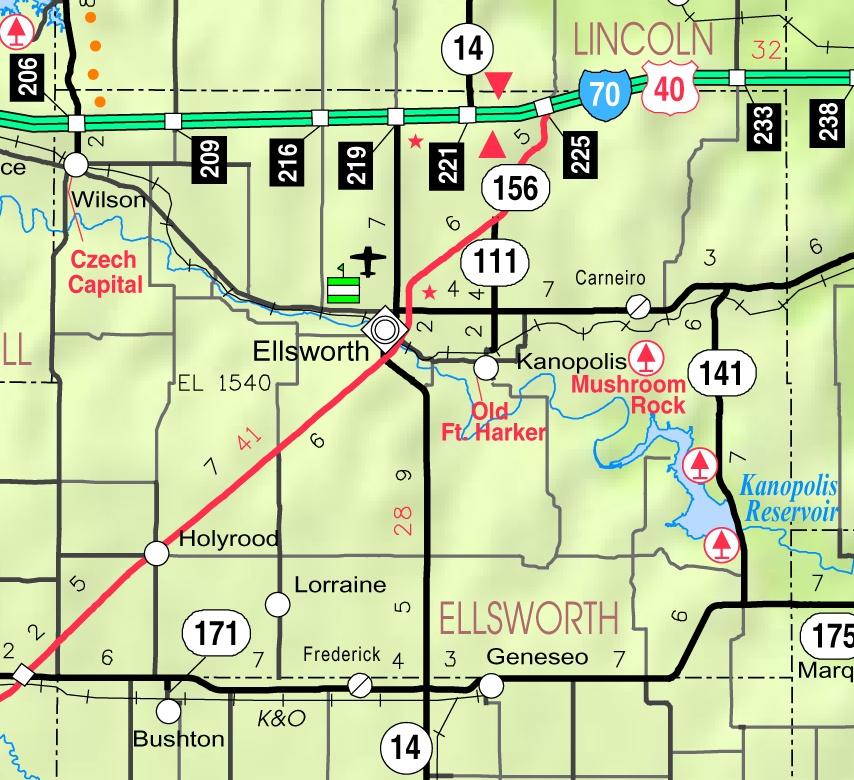
- KDOT map of Ellsworth County (legend)

- Location within the state of Kansas Carneiro (the United States)
- Coordinates: 38°44′20″N 98°01′51″W
- Country: United States
- State: Kansas
- County: Ellsworth
- Township: Carneiro
- Elevation: 1,578 ft (481 m)
- Time zone: UTC-6 (CST)
  - Summer (DST): UTC-5 (CDT)
- Area code: 785
- FIPS code: 20-10775
- GNIS ID: 475476

Carneiro is an unincorporated community in Ellsworth County, Kansas, United States. It is located approximately 10 miles (16 km) east of Ellsworth, north of Mushroom Rock State Park and Kanopolis Lake.

== History ==
Carneiro was a station and shipping point on the Union Pacific Railroad.

The first post office in Carneiro was established as Alum Creek in 1872. The post office was renamed Carneiro in 1882, and remained in operation until it was discontinued in 1953. The obituary of Ernest Oakley Cunningham states that he served as Post Master in Carneiro, then later, Post Master in Langley, Kansas. Mr. Cunningham came to Ellsworth county in 1870, at the age of 15. At the time of his death, he was the oldest of the pioneers then living in Ellsworth County.

== Education ==
The community is served by Ellsworth USD 327 public school district.
