= K141 =

K141 may refer to:

- Russian submarine Kursk (K-141), lost at sea in 2000
- HMCS Summerside (K141), a Canadian Royal Navy corvette
- K-141 (Kansas highway), United States, a road
