= Kanopolis Drive-in Theatre =

Kanopolis Drive-In Theatre
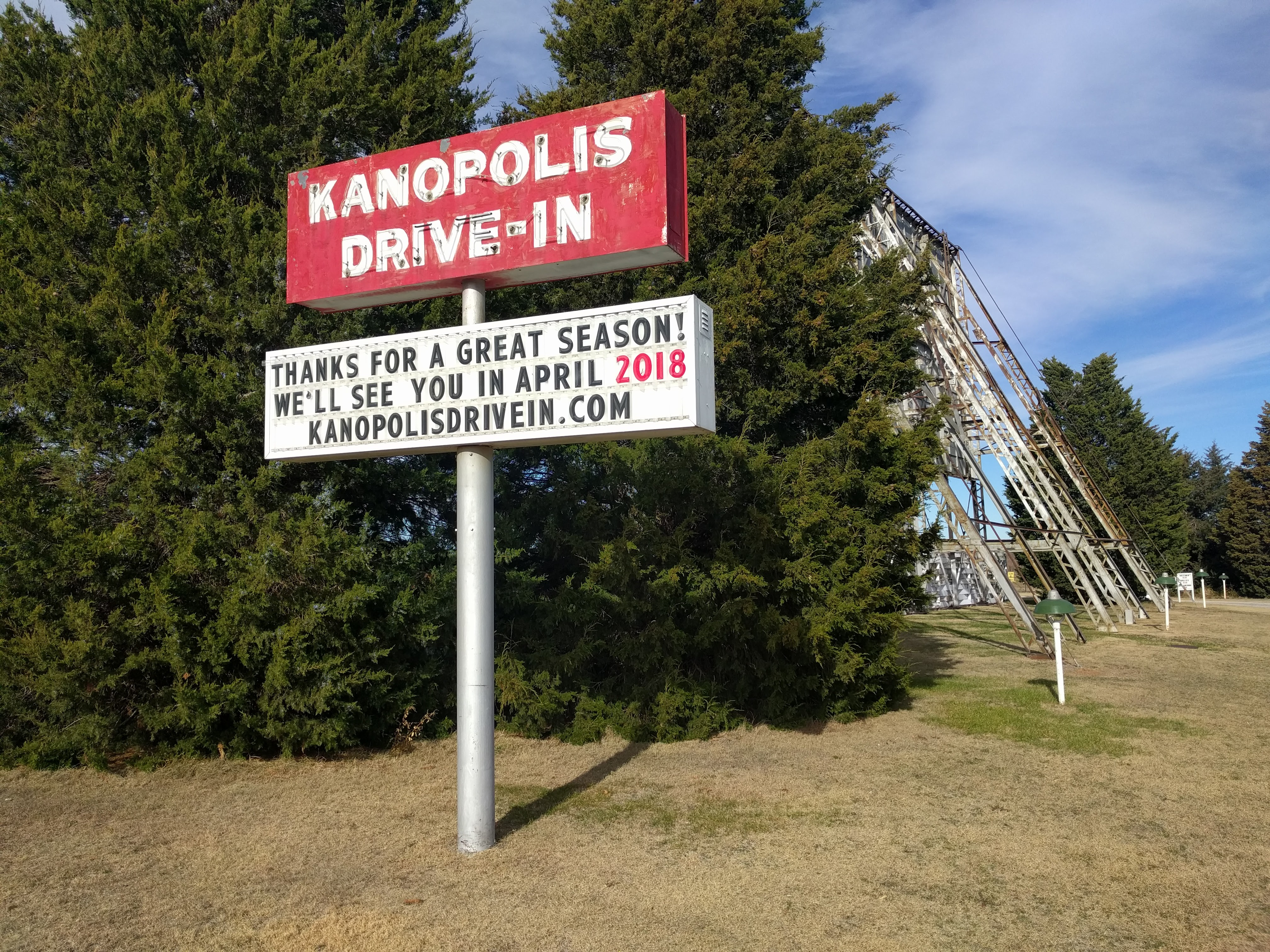

- Location of Kanopolis Drive-in Theatre in Ellsworth County, Kansas
- Former names: Lakeview Drive-In
- Address: 804 N Kansas Ave, Kanopolis, KS 67454
- Location: Kanopolis, Kansas
- Coordinates: 38.718409°N 98.158611°W
- Owner: Tyson Moyer, Jessica Eagle
- Seating type: Picnic tables
- Capacity: 165 cars
- Type: Theatre
- Event: Movies
- Surface: Gravel, grass

Construction
- Opened: 1952
- Renovated: 2011, 2013, 2025
- Closed: 2006–2011

Website
- http://www.kanopolisdrivein.com/

Kanopolis Drive-in Theatre, opened in 1952, is a single-screen drive-in theater located on the northwest side of Kanopolis, Kansas. The theater, which has a 32x70 feet screen and a capacity of 165 cars, ran in continuous operation until 2006. The theatre re-opened as the Kanopolis Drive-In in May 2011. In 2025 it had new owners.

== History ==
Kanopolis Drive-in was opened by U.S. veteran Tony Blazina in 1952. Prior to its opening, Blazina had a mobile movie business, in which he and his wife, Olga, were hired by merchants in surrounding small towns to show movies for customers. From this experience, Tony designed a drive-in theater initially with a smaller screen. The current 32x70 feet screen was installed after the original was damaged in a wind storm. Following Tony's death in 1994, the family business was managed by Olga, and daughters, Liz Ray and Irene Pacey.

The theater operated continuously until Olga's death in 2009, followed by Ray two months later. Pacey considered reopening after five years, but decided to sell the theater to Ellsworth County residents Josh and Amanda Webb. The Webb family invested in maintenance and modernization of the theater, including the installation of a new roof on the projector house, new FM audio transmitters for movie sound, and repainting of the movie screen. The theater was reopened in May 2011, and converted to a digital projection system in 2013.

In late 2024, the Kanopolis Drive-in Theatre was purchased by Tyson Moyer and Jessica Eagle-Moyer, beginning a new phase in the theater's history. The new owners, who have ties to Ellsworth County, acquired the historic venue with the stated goal of preserving its character while continuing its role as a community gathering place.

The theater reopened for the 2025 season following renovations and updates to the property. Reported improvements included upgrades to concession and restroom facilities, as well as expanded programming such as themed events and community activities.

The Kanopolis Drive-in Theatre remains one of the few operating drive-in theaters in Kansas. It continues to operate as a seasonal theater offering double-feature programming and community-oriented entertainment while maintaining its historic identity as a traditional American drive-in theater.
