= Ellsworth USD 327 =

Public school district in Ellsworth, Kansas

Address
- 145 W. 15th St. Ellsworth, Kansas, 67439; United States
- Coordinates: 38.7402°N 98.2278°W

District information
- Type: Public
- Grades: K to 12
- Schools: 3

Other information
- Website: usd327.org

Ellsworth USD 327 is a public unified school district headquartered in Ellsworth, Kansas, United States. The district includes the communities of Ellsworth, Kanopolis, Geneseo, Carneiro, Yankee Run, Black Wolf, and nearby rural areas.

== History ==
School unification consolidated Ellsworth, Geneseo, and Kanopolis schools into USD 327.

== Schools ==
The school district operates the following schools:

- Ellsworth Junior/Senior High School
- Kanopolis Middle School
- Ellsworth Elementary School

Clubs and organizations at the Junior Senior High include Future Farmers America, National Honor Society, Art Club, Band and flags, the Student Council, Ellsworth Singers, the Choir and Spanish Club.

Senior high sports include football, cross country, girls' basketball, softball, volleyball, wrestling, track and field, baseball, cheerleading and girls' tennis.

Junior high school sports include football, wrestling, track and field, cheerleading, cross country and volleyball, boys as well as girls may also play basketball.

== See also ==
- Kansas State Department of Education
- Kansas State High School Activities Association
- List of high schools in Kansas
- List of unified school districts in Kansas
