= Salemsborg, Kansas =

Unincorporated community in Saline County, Kansas

- Unincorporated community
- Location within Saline County and Kansas

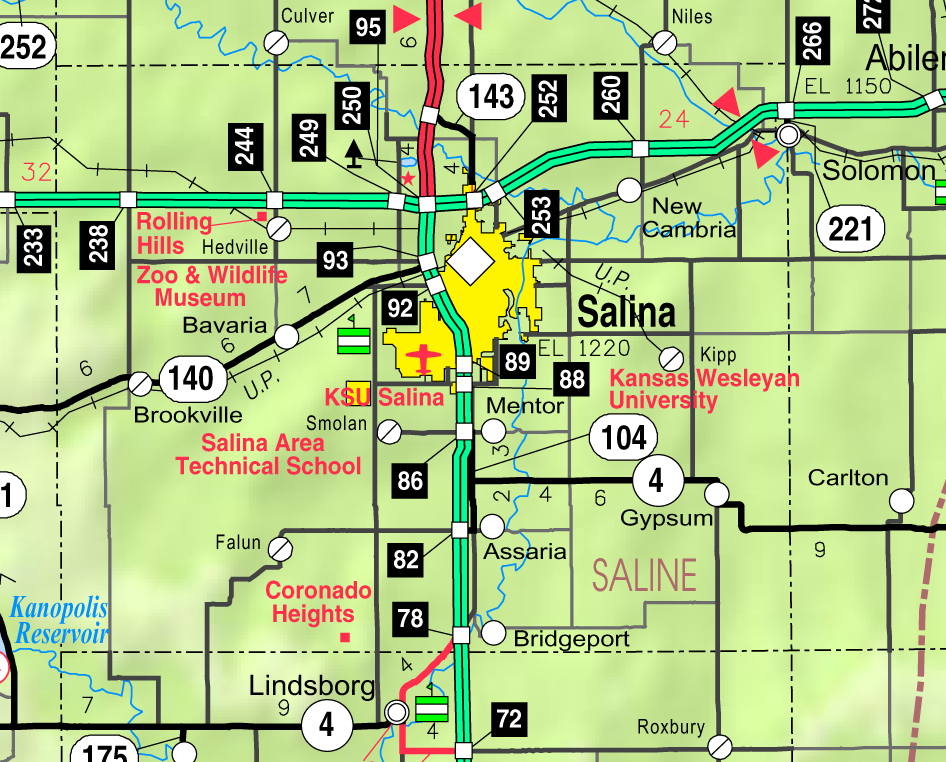
- KDOT map of Saline County (legend)
- Coordinates: 38°41′43″N 97°41′10″W
- Country: United States
- State: Kansas
- County: Saline
- Elevation: 1,326 ft (404 m)
- Time zone: UTC-6 (CST)
  - Summer (DST): UTC-5 (CDT)
- ZIP Code: 67456
- Area code: 785
- FIPS code: 20-62685
- GNIS ID: 484798

Salemsborg is an unincorporated community in Saline County, Kansas, United States. It is located about 10 miles south-southwest of Salina at the intersection of Burma Road and Salemsborg Road.

== Demographics ==
As a part of Saline County, Salemsborg is a part of the Salina micropolitan area.

== Education ==
The community is served by Smoky Valley USD 400 public school district.

== See also ==
- List of Nike missile locations - two miles south of Salemsborg
