= Black Wolf, Kansas =

Unincorporated community in Ellsworth County, Kansas

- Unincorporated community
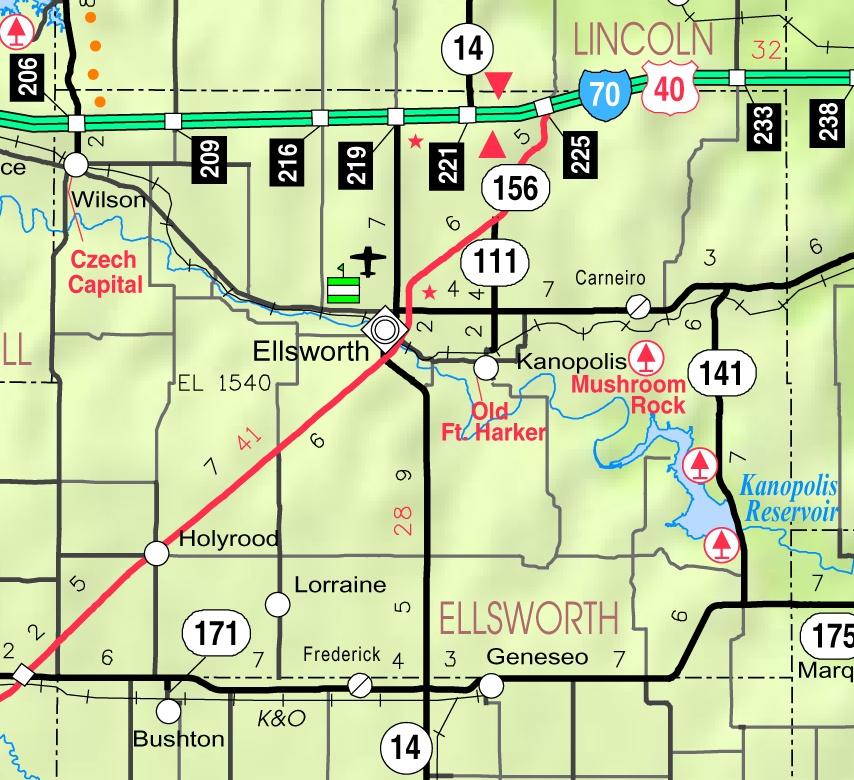
- KDOT map of Ellsworth County (legend)

- Location within the state of Kansas Black Wolf (the United States)
- Coordinates: 38°45′30″N 98°21′43″W
- Country: United States
- State: Kansas
- County: Ellsworth
- Elevation: 1,565 ft (477 m)
- Time zone: UTC-6 (CST)
  - Summer (DST): UTC-5 (CDT)
- Area code: 785
- FIPS code: 20-07000
- GNIS ID: 475344

Black Wolf is an unincorporated community in Ellsworth County, Kansas, United States. It is approximately 6 miles (9.7 km) west of Ellsworth.

== History ==
A post office was opened in Black Wolf in 1879, closed temporarily in 1908, reopened a few months later and remained in operation until it was closed in 1953. According to tradition, "Black Wolf" was the name of a local Indian. Black Wolf was a station on the Union Pacific Railroad.

== Education ==
The community is served by Ellsworth USD 327 public school district.
