= Kanopolis Lake =

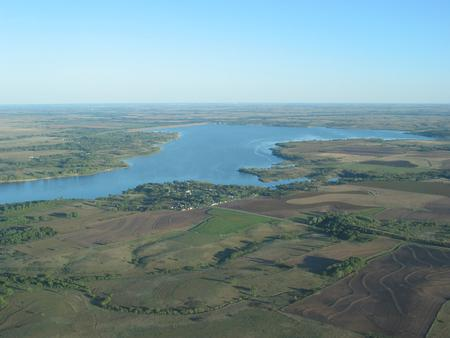
- Aerial view of Kanopolis Lake

- Location within Kansas Location within the United States

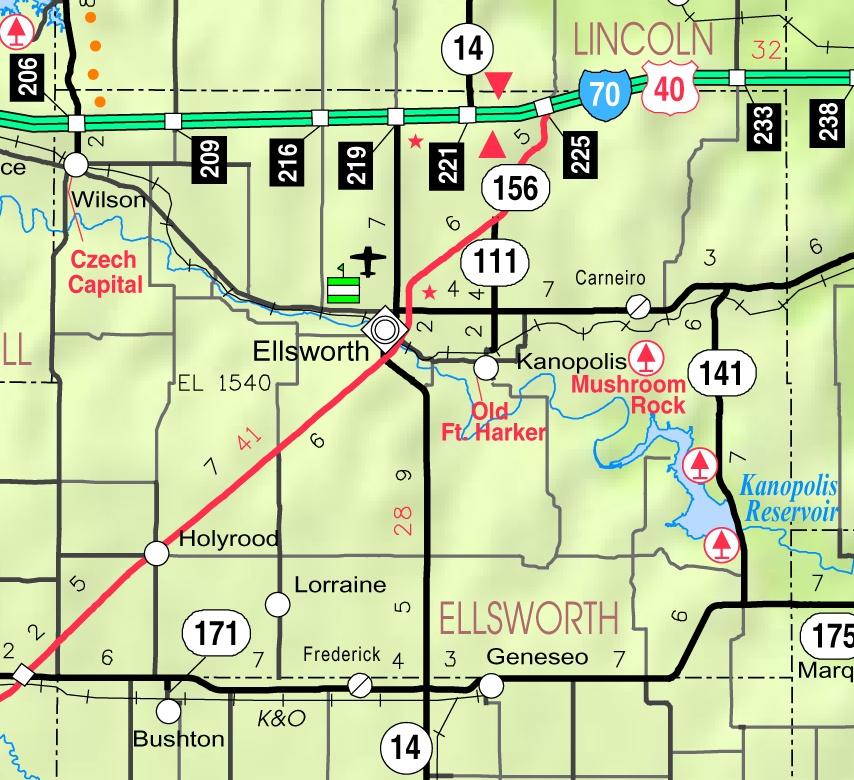
- KDOT map of Ellsworth County (legend)
- Location: Ellsworth County, Kansas
- Coordinates: 38°37′58″N 97°59′53″W
- Type: Reservoir
- Primary inflows: Smoky Hill River
- Primary outflows: Smoky Hill River
- Catchment area: 2,330 sq mi (6,000 km^{2})
- Basin countries: United States
- Managing agency: U.S. Army Corps of Engineers
- Built: 1948
- First flooded: February 17, 1948
- Max. length: 12 miles (19 km)
- Surface area: 3,406 acres (13.78 km^{2})
- Max. depth: 35 ft (11 m)
- Water volume: Full: 49,474 acre⋅ft (61,025,000 m^{3}); Current (Nov. 2015): 47,080 acre⋅ft (58,070,000 m^{3})
- Shore length^{1}: 41 miles (66 km)
- Surface elevation: Full: 1,463 feet (446 m); Current (Nov. 2015): 1,462.5 feet (445.8 m)
- Settlements: Kanopolis, Langley, Venango, Yankee Run
- ^{1} Shore length is not a well-defined measure.

Kanopolis Lake is a reservoir in Ellsworth County in the Smoky Hills of central Kansas, about 31 miles southwest of Salina and a few miles southeast of the town of Kanopolis. The lake is formed by Kanopolis Dam. Completed in 1948 as a flood control and water conservation project of the United States Army Corps of Engineers, the dam impounds the Smoky Hill River.

== History ==
The Flood Control Act of 1938 authorized the construction of Kanopolis Dam and Lake, and the U.S. Army Corps of Engineers began work in June 1940. The outbreak of World War II, however, led to a suspension of the effort in 1942, delaying the project for 3 1/2 years. The Corps of Engineers finally completed construction in 1948 at a cost of $12.3 million. Storage of water in the reservoir began February 17, 1948. Kanopolis Lake was the first reservoir built in the Corps of Engineers' Kansas City District which continues to oversee it to the present day.

== Geography ==
Kanopolis Lake is located at 38°37′58″N 97°59′53″W (38.6327013, -97.9980411) at an elevation of 1,463 feet (446 m). It lies in central Kansas in the Smoky Hills region of the Great Plains. It is located entirely within Ellsworth County.

The reservoir is impounded at its southeastern end by Kanopolis Dam. The dam is located at 38°37′00″N 97°58′06″W (38.6166747, -97.9683822) at an elevation of 1,467 feet (447 m). The Smoky Hill River is both the reservoir's primary inflow from the northwest and outflow to the southeast. Smaller tributaries include Alum Creek, which flows south into the northern end of the reservoir, and Bluff Creek, which flows north-northeast into the southwest part of the reservoir.

Kansas Highway 141 runs generally north-south along the reservoir's eastern shore and across the top of Kanopolis Dam.

There are two settlements at Kanopolis Lake, both unincorporated: Yankee Run on the western shore and Venango on the eastern shore immediately north of the dam.

== Hydrography ==
The surface area, surface elevation, and water volume of the reservoir fluctuate based on inflow and local climatic conditions. In terms of capacity, the Corps of Engineers vertically divides the reservoir into a set of pools based on volume and water level, and the reservoir is considered full when filled to the capacity of its multi-purpose pool. When full, Kanopolis Lake has a surface area of 3,406 acres (13.78 km^{2}), a surface elevation of 1,463 feet (446 m), and a volume of 49,474 acre⋅ft (61,025,000 m^{3}). When filled to maximum capacity, it has a surface area of 23,408 acres (94.73 km^{2}), a surface elevation of 1,532 feet (467 m), and a volume of 857,407 acre⋅ft (1.057596×10^{9} m^{3}).

The streambed underlying the reservoir has an elevation of 1,406 feet (429 m). Since the reservoir's initial flooding, sedimentation has gradually accumulated on the reservoir bottom thus raising its elevation.

When full, the reservoir has 41 miles (66 km) of shoreline while, at the top of its flood control pool, it has 135 miles (217 km) of shoreline.

== Infrastructure ==
Kanopolis Dam is a rolled earth-fill embankment dam with riprap on its upstream face. It stands 131 feet (40 m) tall and 15,360 feet (4,680 m) long. At its crest, the dam has an elevation of 1,537 feet (468 m).

== Management ==
The Kansas City District of the U.S. Army Corps of Engineers manages Kanopolis Dam and Kanopolis Lake for the purposes of flood damage reduction, recreation, fish and wildlife management, and water supply and quality management. The Corps also oversees 11,000 acres (45 km^{2}) of land around the reservoir, conducting prairie restoration, prescribed burning, and tree planting in order to conserve soil and benefit wildlife. The Corps also leases 41 units of land totaling roughly 12,500 acres (51 km^{2}) to area farmers to use with designated wildlife management requirements.

Of the land around the reservoir, the Kansas Department of Wildlife, Parks and Tourism (KDWP) manages over 5,000 acres (20 km^{2}) as the Smoky Hill Wildlife Area. It has designated a portion of the Area as a wildlife refuge. The KDWP also stocks fish for the reservoir seasonally.

== Parks and recreation ==
The Corps of Engineers manages three parks at Kanopolis Lake: Venango Park, Outlet Park, and Riverside Park. The largest, Venango Park, is located on the reservoir's eastern shore just north of Kanopolis Dam. It hosts campgrounds, hiking trails, an ATV trail, a swimming beach, and a boat ramp. Outlet Park is a small park that lies immediately below the dam at the confluence of the Smoky Hill River with Sand Creek. Riverside Park is on the south bank of the river just east of Outlet Park and hosts camping facilities. The Corps of Engineers Information Center is also located below the dam, just south of Outlet Park. The Corps also operates the Boldt Bluff and Yankee Run access areas, located on the reservoir's western shore, for fishing and primitive camping.

The KDWP oversees Kanopolis State Park which is divided into two areas: the Horsethief Area, located on the reservoir's eastern shore north of Venango Park, and the Langley Point Area, located on the southern shore immediately west of the dam. Both areas host amphitheaters, boat ramps, and camping facilities. The Horsethief Area also includes extensive hiking trails, several of which extend into the Smoky Hill Wildlife Area. The Langley Point Area also includes a baseball field, a marina, and a swimming beach. KDWP also manages Mushroom Rock State Park located approximately 4 miles (6.4 km) north of the reservoir.

Kanopolis Lake is open to sport fishing. Almost 16,000 acres (65 km^{2}) of public land near the reservoir, most of it upstream along the Smoky Hill River, are open to hunting.

=== Points of interest ===
The Faris Caves are located in the Smoky Hill Wildlife Area northwest of the reservoir. Carved into the sandstone cliffs along the Smoky Hill River by early American settlers, they once served as a schoolhouse, living quarters, and a milk house.

== Wildlife ==
Fish species resident in Kanopolis Lake include channel catfish, crappie, largemouth bass, saugeye, walleye, white bass, and wiper. Game animals living around the reservoir include coyotes, deer, pheasants, prairie chickens, rabbits, quail, squirrels, turkeys, and various waterfowl. Bald eagles and ospreys migrate through the area in winter.

== Gallery ==
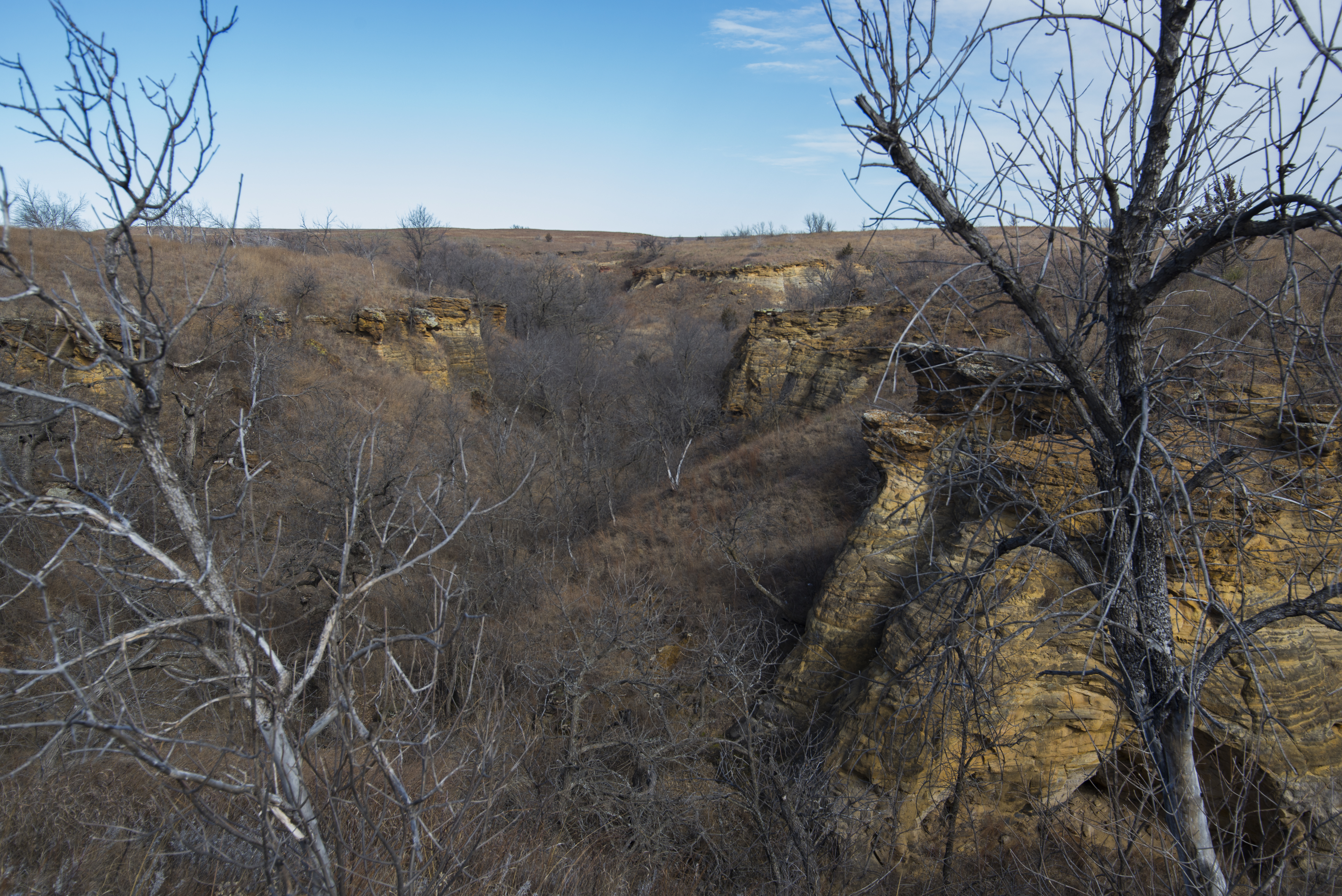
Horse Thief Canyon in Kanopolis State Park

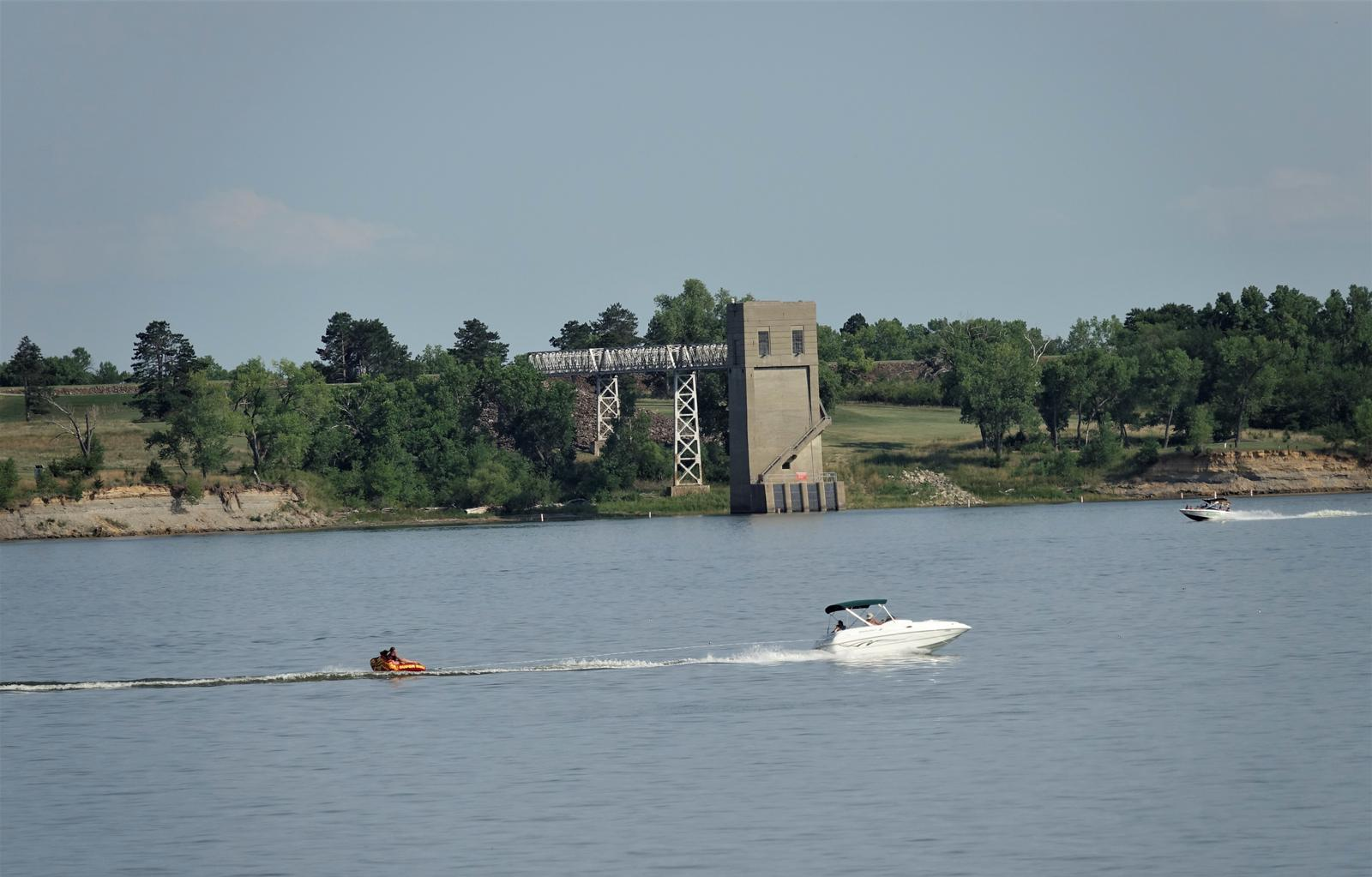
Kanopolis Dam

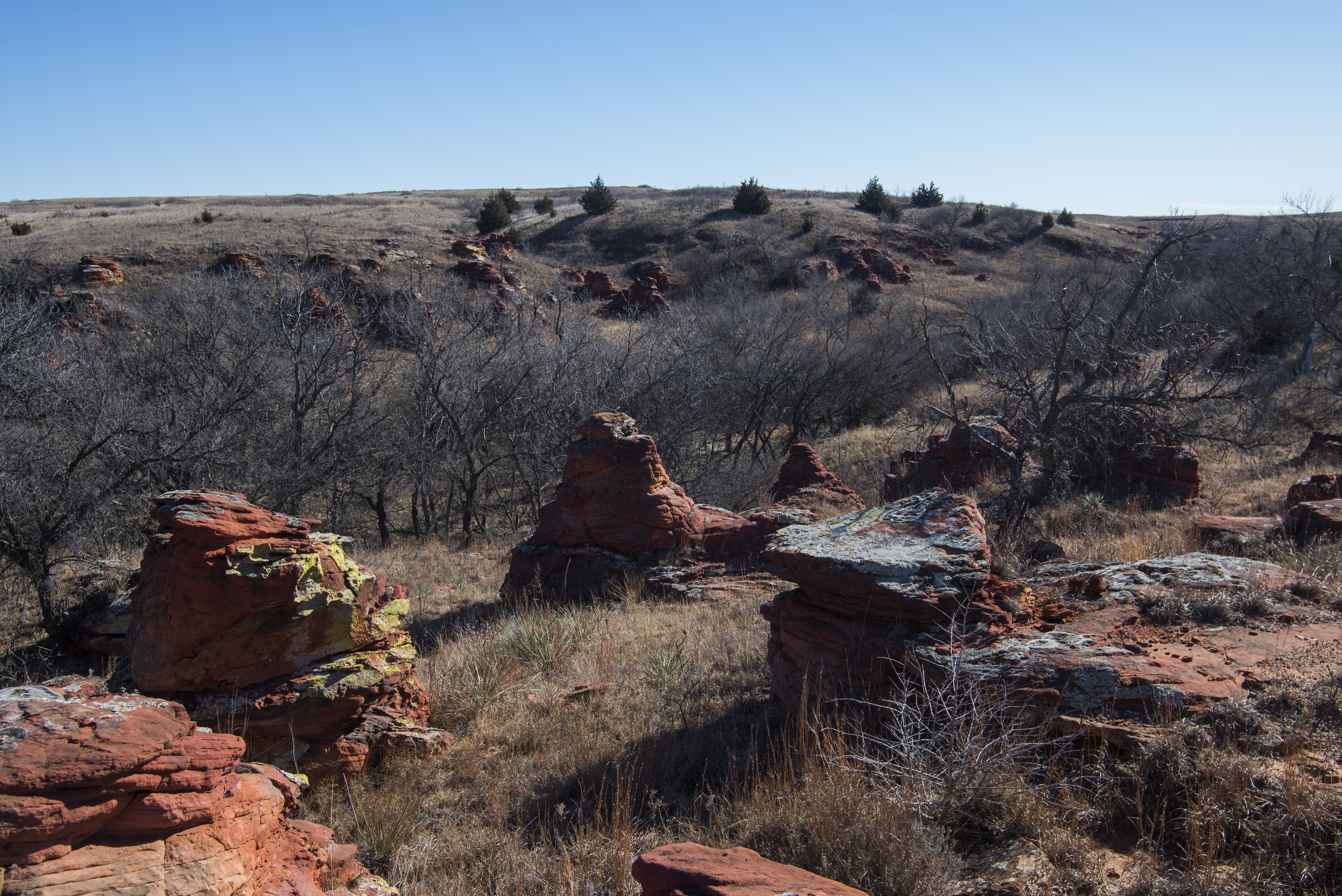
Red Rock Canyon at Kanopolis Lake

== See also ==
- Kanopolis State Park
- Mushroom Rock State Park, north of lake
- Faris Caves
- List of Kansas state parks
- List of lakes, reservoirs, and dams in Kansas
- List of rivers of Kansas
