= Smoky Valley USD 400 =

Public school district in Lindsborg, Kansas

Address
- 126 S. Main St. Lindsborg, Kansas, 67456; United States
- Coordinates: 38.5724°N 97.6762°W

District information
- Type: Public
- Grades: K to 12
- Schools: 3

Other information
- Website: smokyvalley.org

Smoky Valley USD 400, also known as Smoky Valley Public Schools, is a public unified school district headquartered in Lindsborg, Kansas, United States. The district includes the communities of Lindsborg, Falun, Johnstown, Langley, Marquette, Roxbury, Salemsborg, Smolan, Venango, and nearby rural areas.

== Schools ==
The school district operates the following schools:

- Smoky Valley High School
- Smoky Valley Middle School
- Soderstrom Elementary School

== See also ==
- List of high schools in Kansas
- List of unified school districts in Kansas
- Kansas State Department of Education
- Kansas State High School Activities Association
