= Falun, Kansas =

Unincorporated community in Saline County, Kansas

- Unincorporated community and CDP
- Location within Saline County and Kansas

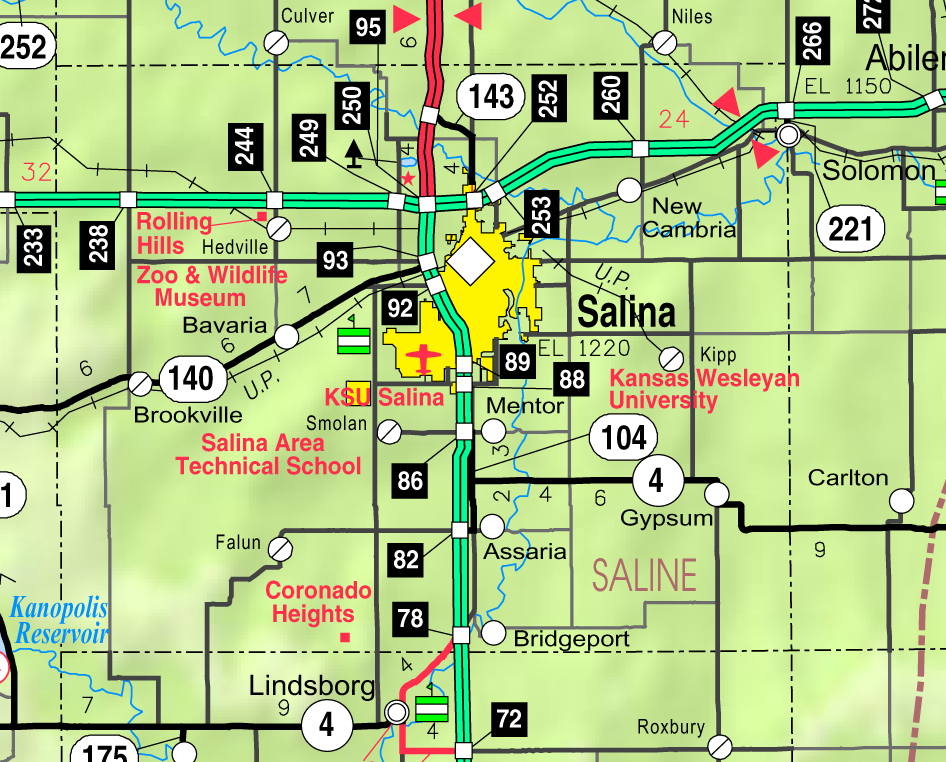
- KDOT map of Saline County (legend)
- Coordinates: 38°40′16″N 97°45′34″W
- Country: United States
- State: Kansas
- County: Saline
- Founded: 1870
- Elevation: 1,348 ft (411 m)

Population (2020)
  - Total: 83
- Time zone: UTC-6 (CST)
  - Summer (DST): UTC-5 (CDT)
- ZIP Code: 67442
- Area code: 785
- FIPS code: 20-22900
- GNIS ID: 476938

Falun is an unincorporated community and census-designated place (CDP) in southwestern Saline County, Kansas, United States. As of the 2020 census, the population was 83. It lies southwest of Salina and northwest of Lindsborg at the intersection of Forsse and Hedberg roads, approximately 7.5 miles west of Interstate 135, or about eight miles west of Assaria. It lies next to an abandoned railroad.

== History ==
Falun was founded by the Swedish immigrant Erik Fors (or Eric Forsse as he called himself in America). Erik Fors was born in Malung, and emigrated to America in 1850. He participated in The Civil War 1861–1865, and in 1869 he moved to Kansas with about forty other Swedish settlers and founded Falun, after the name of the town neighboring his birthtown called Falun. Some of the Falun residents came directly from Sweden, while others arrived after having lived in Bishop Hill and Galva, Illinois.

The first post office in Falun was established in 1870.

In 1886, the Union Pacific Railroad put rails through the township and established a station; the railway was essential for the town's continued development.

In the following year the residents of Falun decided that their numbers had grown sufficiently for them to establish a church. The first pastors for this new church were Rev. Carl A. Swenson, who would visit one Sunday a month, and Mr. Carl G. Norman, who was the regular pulpit supply.

It has a post office with the ZIP Code 67442.

== Geography ==
Falun's elevation is 1,348 feet (411 m), and it is located at 38°40′16″N 97°45′34″W (38.6711171, -97.7594855).

== Demographics ==
Historical population
Census	Pop.	Note	%±
2020	83		—
U.S. Decennial Census

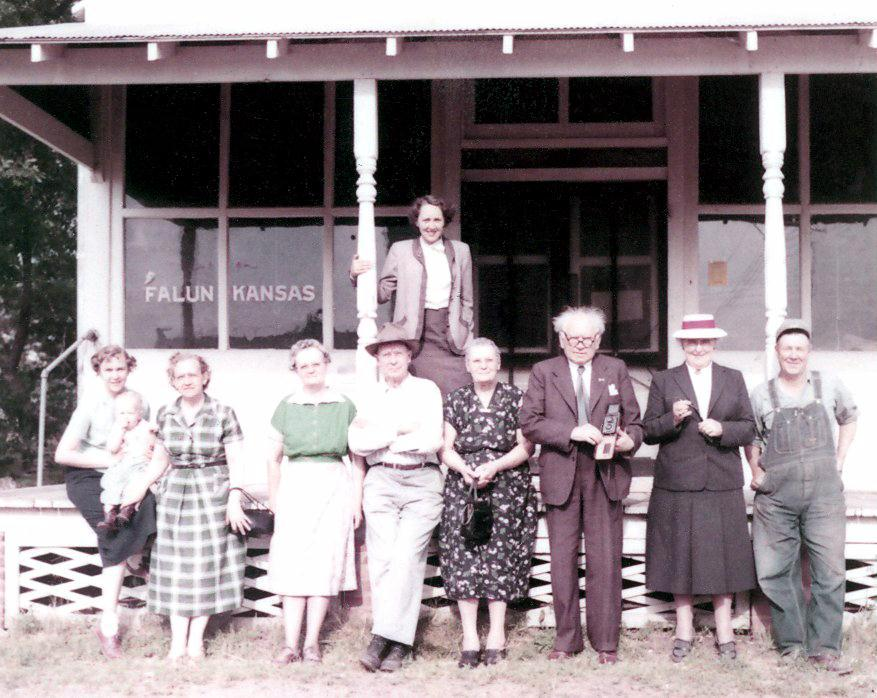
Stefan Anderson from Ludvika (third from right) visits Falun in May, 1955

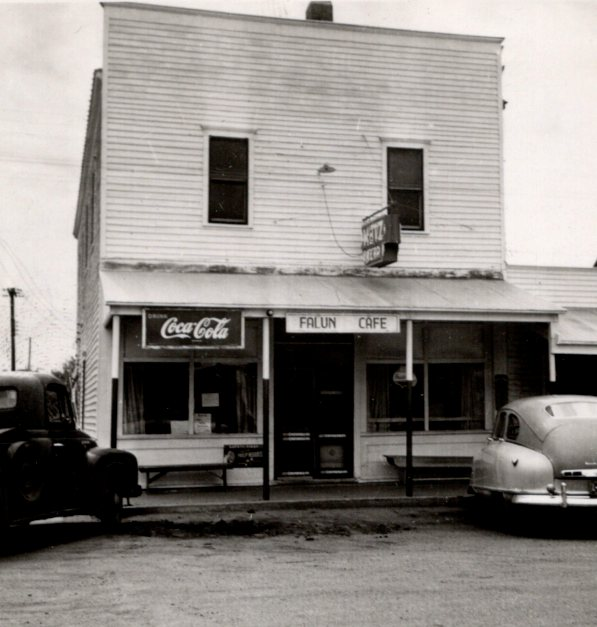
Falun Café in 1955

Falun is a part of the Salina micropolitan area.

The 2020 United States census counted 83 people, 45 households, and 39 families in Falun. The population density was 74.8 per square mile (28.9/km^{2}). There were 46 housing units at an average density of 41.5 per square mile (16.0/km^{2}). The racial makeup was 87.95% (73) white or European American (87.95% non-Hispanic white), 1.2% (1) black or African-American, 3.61% (3) Native American or Alaska Native, 1.2% (1) Asian, 0.0% (0) Pacific Islander or Native Hawaiian, 0.0% (0) from other races, and 6.02% (5) from two or more races. Hispanic or Latino of any race was 4.82% (4) of the population.

Of the 45 households, 11.1% had children under the age of 18; 82.2% were married couples living together; 4.4% had a female householder with no spouse or partner present. 8.9% of households consisted of individuals and 2.2% had someone living alone who was 65 years of age or older. The average household size was 2.9 and the average family size was 1.9. The percent of those with a bachelor's degree or higher was estimated to be 0.0% of the population.

20.5% of the population was under the age of 18, 4.8% from 18 to 24, 19.3% from 25 to 44, 42.2% from 45 to 64, and 13.3% who were 65 years of age or older. The median age was 49.1 years. For every 100 females, there were 97.6 males. For every 100 females ages 18 and older, there were 106.2 males.

== Education ==
The community is served by Smoky Valley USD 400 public school district.

== Notable people ==
- U. Alexis Johnson (1908–1997), United States diplomat; was born in Falun.
