= Fellsburg, Kansas =

Unincorporated community in Edwards County, Kansas

Coordinates: 37.812°N 99.179°W

Fellsburg is an unincorporated community in Edwards County, Kansas, United States.

== History ==
A post office was opened in Fellsburg in 1880, and remained in operation until it was discontinued in 1984.
