= Carneiro Township, Kansas =

Carneiro Township
- Township
- Location in Ellsworth County
- Coordinates: 38°44′26″N 097°59′02″W
- Country: United States
- State: Kansas
- County: Ellsworth

Area
  - Total: 36.19 sq mi (93.73 km^{2})
  - Land: 36.06 sq mi (93.39 km^{2})
  - Water: 0.13 sq mi (0.34 km^{2}) 0.36%
- Elevation: 1,539 ft (469 m)

Population (2020)
  - Total: 54
  - Density: 1.5/sq mi (0.58/km^{2})
- GNIS feature ID: 0475367

Carneiro Township is a township in Ellsworth County, Kansas, United States. As of the 2020 census, its population was 54.

== Geography ==
Carneiro Township covers an area of 36.19 square miles (93.7 km^{2}) and contains no incorporated settlements. According to the USGS, it contains two cemeteries: Carneiro and Terra Cotta.
