= Faris Caves =

Caves in Kansas, United States

- Faris Caves in 2026

- Location within Ellsworth County, Kansas
- Location: Ellsworth County, Kansas, United States
- Coordinates: 38.695546°N 98.103041°W
- Elevation: 479 m (1,572 ft)

Faris Caves are a series of artificially excavated caves located along the Smoky Hill River in central Ellsworth County, Kansas. Each of the three caves are about 12-feet square, with 10-foot arched ceiling, dug out of the Dakota Sandstone with a pickaxe by Coloradan miner Charles Griffee in the 1880s. Fresh spring water flowed through one of the caves to help keep food and supplies cool in the hot months.

Griffee sold his land and caves to Winfield and William Faris in 1893. A house was built nearby, with the caves continuing to be used for storage, a spring house, generator room, and for a short time, a schoolhouse.
