= Kanopolis State Park =

State park in Kansas, United States

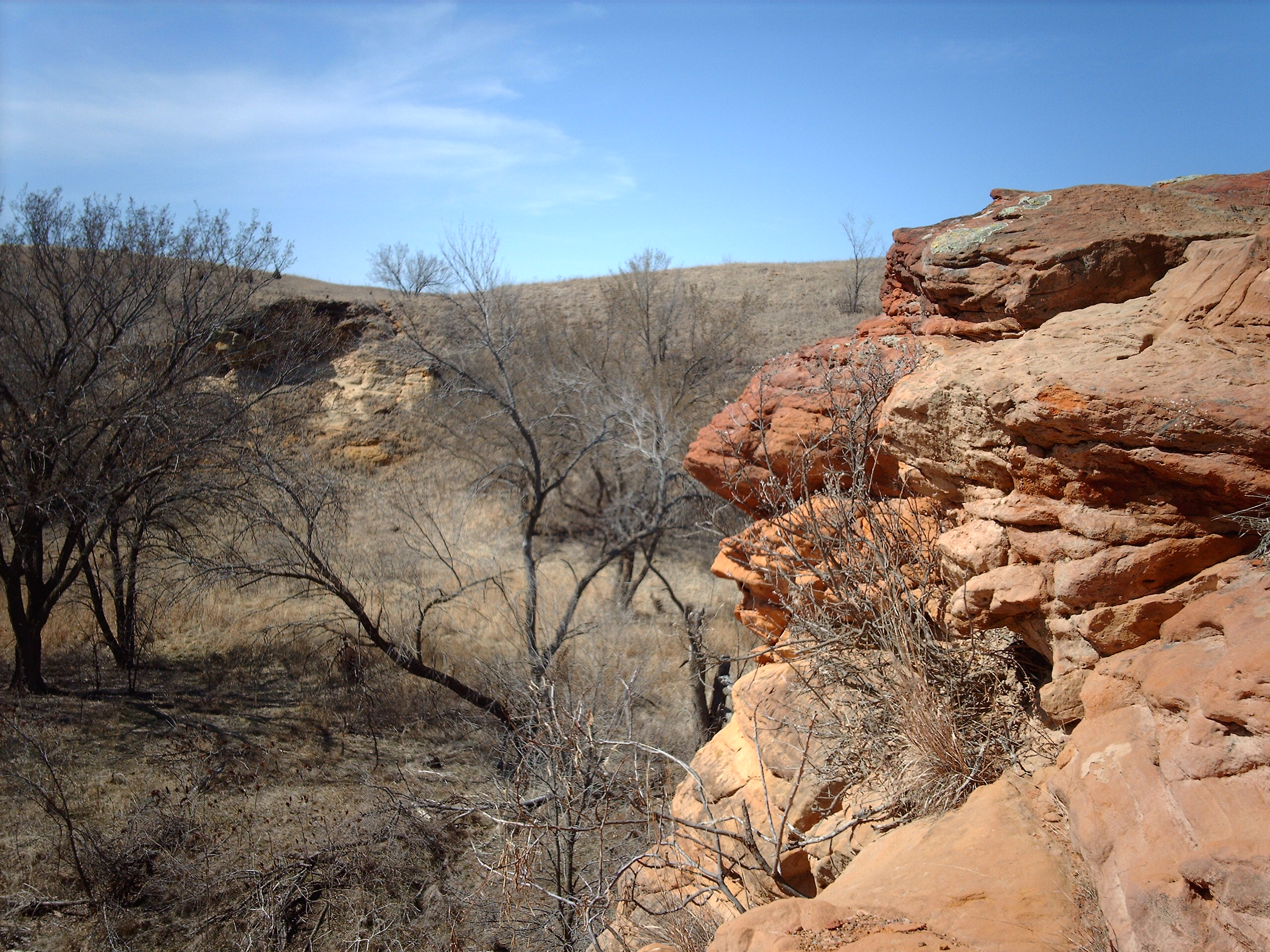

- Location within Kansas Location within the United States
- Interactive map of Kanopolis State Park
- Location: Ellsworth County, Kansas, United States
- Coordinates: 38°39′26″N 97°59′59″W
- Elevation: 1,463 ft (446 m)
- Established: 1958
- Administrator: Kansas Department of Wildlife and Parks
- Visitors: 290,436 (in 2022)
- Website: Official website
- Kansas State Parks

Kanopolis State Park is located in the Smoky Hills region of the U.S. state of Kansas. The park is located southwest of the city of Salina, just south of I-70. It contains a reservoir, desert plants such as yucca, a prairie dog town, and sandstone canyons.

The park, established in 1958, includes 3,500-acre Kanopolis Lake and a 12,500-acre wildlife area of rolling hills, bluffs and woods offering hunting, fishing, over 25 miles (40 km) of trails, and other recreational activities. Game includes pheasant, quail, prairie chickens, deer, beaver, wild turkey, squirrels, rabbits, coyotes and waterfowl; fishing for white bass and crappie is popular. A small, outlier population of western diamondback rattlesnake is present in the park.

== Park attractions ==
The following are components of Kanopolis State Park recreation area:

- Kanopolis Lake
- Mushroom Rock State Park
- Faris Caves
- Smoky Hill Wildlife Area
- Horsethief Canyon

== See also ==
- List of lakes, reservoirs, and dams in Kansas
- List of rivers of Kansas
