= Mushroom Rock State Park =

State park in Kansas, United States

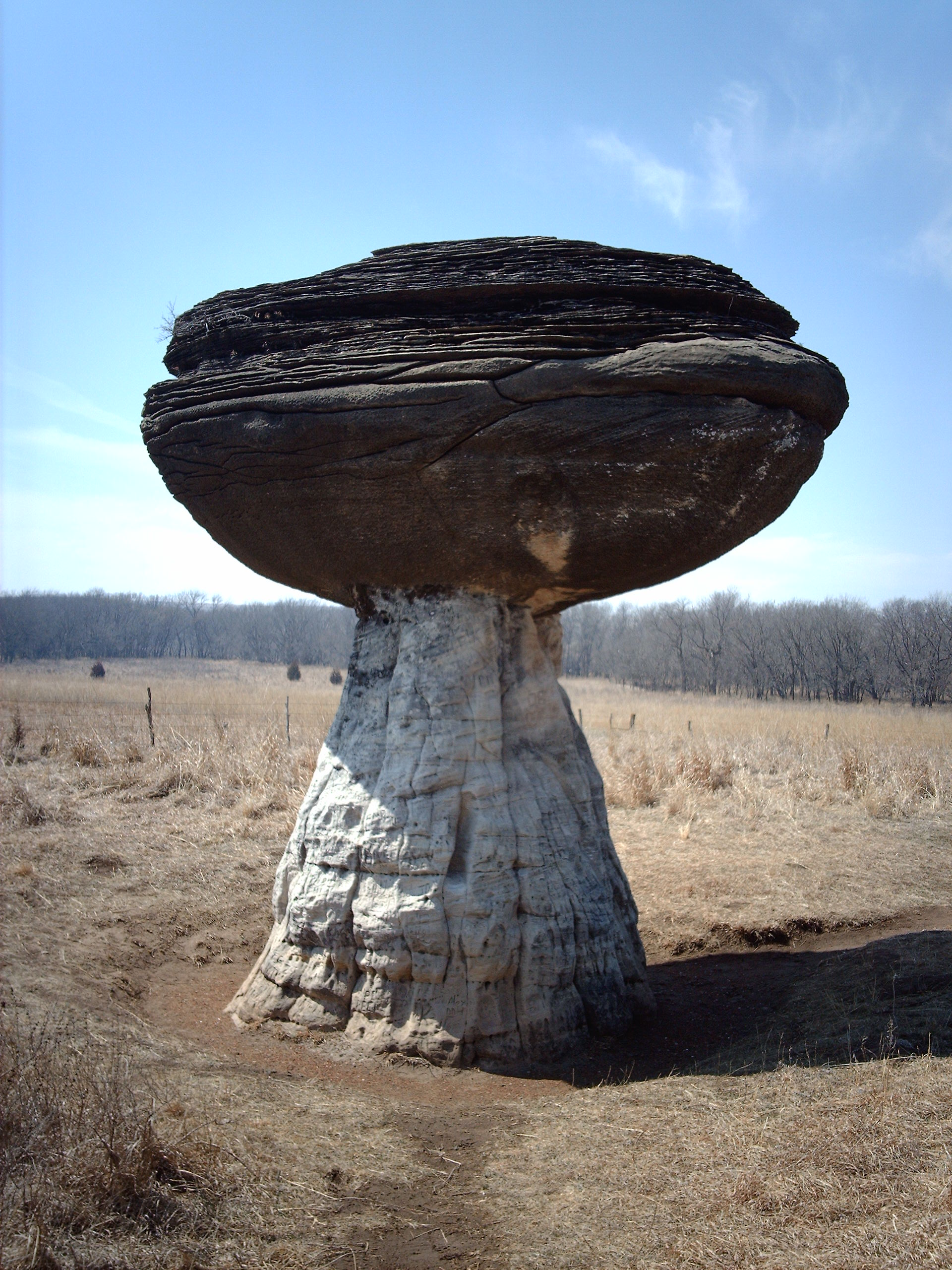
- Pedestal formed by nonuniform weathering

- Location within Kansas Location within the United States
- Interactive map of Mushroom Rock State Park
- Location: Ellsworth County, Kansas, United States
- Coordinates: 38°43′33″N 98°01′50″W
- Area: 5 acres (2.0 ha)
- Elevation: 488 ft (149 m)
- Established: April 25, 1965
- Administrator: Kansas Department of Wildlife and Parks
- Visitors: 290,436 (in 2022)
- Website: Official website
- Kansas State Parks

Mushroom Rock State Park is noted for its mushroom rock formations. It is located in the Smoky Hills region of north-central Kansas in Ellsworth County, Kansas, United States.

These rocks are the remains of beach sands and sediments of the Cretaceous Period, the interval of geologic time from about 144 to 66 million years ago. Sandstone and sedimentary rock are held together by natural cement. The concretions that make up mushroom rocks are cemented calcium carbonate. The largest rock measures 27 feet in diameter. Two mushrooms and a giant shoe rock, as well as numerous other rock formations, are in the 5-acre (2.0 ha) park.

Mushroom Rock is Kansas's smallest state park, as well as being "one of the eight wonders of Kansas geography." Mushroom Rock State Park is managed by Kanopolis State Park, under regulation of Kansas Department of Wildlife, Parks and Tourism. The rock once served as a meeting place for pioneers and Native Americans.

== Gallery ==
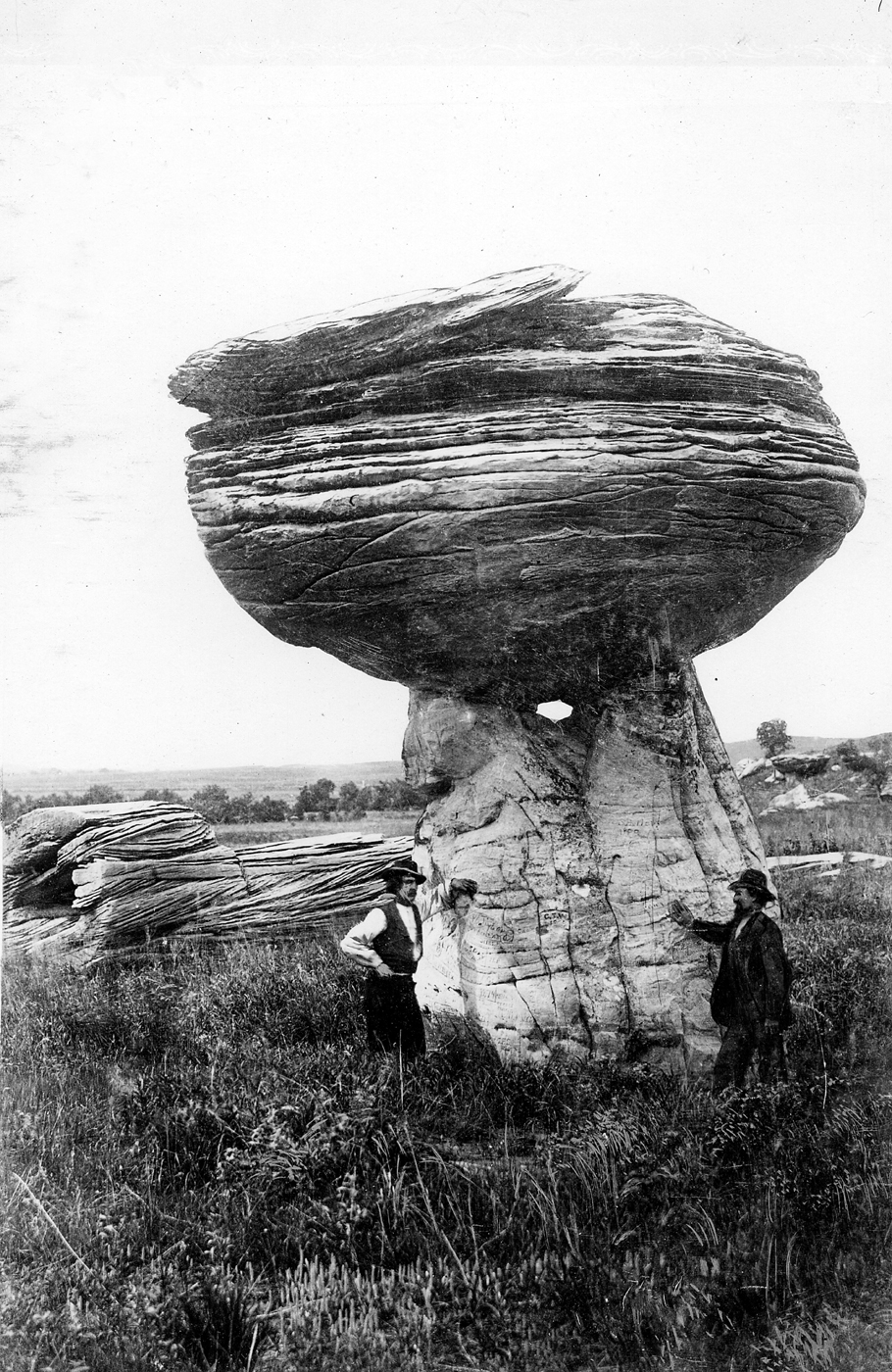
Rock formation at Mushroom Rock State Park (1916)

Rock formation at Mushroom Rock State Park (2016)

Rock formation at Mushroom Rock State Park (2016)

== See also ==
Other rock formations in Kansas:

- Castle Rock (Kansas)
- Monument Rocks (Kansas)
- Rock City, Kansas
