= Gypsum Creek Township, Kansas =

Township in McPherson County, Kansas, US

Gypsum Creek Township
- Township
- Location within McPherson County
- Coordinates: 38.5657°N 97.4000°W
- Country: United States
- State: Kansas
- County: McPherson

Area
  - Total: 36.012 sq mi (93.27 km^{2})
  - Land: 35.964 sq mi (93.15 km^{2})
  - Water: 0.048 sq mi (0.12 km^{2}) 0.13%

Population (2020)
  - Total: 148
  - Density: 4.12/sq mi (1.59/km^{2})
- Time zone: UTC-6 (CST)
  - Summer (DST): UTC-5 (CDT)
- Area code: 620

Gypsum Creek Township is a township in McPherson County, Kansas, United States.

== History ==
It takes its name from Gypsum Creek.

== Geography ==
Gypsum Creek Township covers an area of 36.012 square miles (93.27 square kilometers).

=== Communities ===
- Roxbury

=== Adjacent townships ===
- Gypsum Township, Saline County (north)
- Holland Township, Dickinson County (northeast)
- Logan Township, Marion County (east)
- Moore Township, Marion County (southeast)
- Battle Hill Township, McPherson County (south)
- Delmore Township, McPherson County (southwest)
- Bonaville Township, McPherson County (west)
- Liberty Township, Saline County (northwest)
