= Battle Hill Township, Kansas =

Township in McPherson County, Kansas, US

Battle Hill Township
- Township
- Location within McPherson County
- Coordinates: 38.49°N 97.40°W
- Country: United States
- State: Kansas
- County: McPherson

Area
  - Total: 35.919 sq mi (93.03 km^{2})
  - Land: 35.775 sq mi (92.66 km^{2})
  - Water: 0.144 sq mi (0.37 km^{2}) 0.40%

Population (2020)
  - Total: 108
  - Density: 3.02/sq mi (1.17/km^{2})
- Time zone: UTC-6 (CST)
  - Summer (DST): UTC-5 (CDT)
- Area code: 620

Battle Hill Township is a township in McPherson County, Kansas, United States.

== History ==
Battle Hill Township was organized in 1874.

== Geography ==
Battle Hill Township covers an area of 35.919 square miles (93.03 square kilometers).

=== Adjacent townships ===
- Gypsum Creek Township, McPherson County (north)
- Logan Township, Marion County (northeast)
- Moore Township, Marion County (east)
- Lehigh Township, Marion County (southeast)
- Canton Township, McPherson County (south)
- Empire Township, McPherson County (southwest)
- Delmore Township, McPherson County (west)
- Bonaville Township, McPherson County (northwest)
