= New Gottland Township, Kansas =

Township in McPherson County, Kansas, US

New Gottland Township
- Township
- Location within McPherson County
- Coordinates: 38.49°N 97.64°W
- Country: United States
- State: Kansas
- County: McPherson

Area
  - Total: 36.027 sq mi (93.31 km^{2})
  - Land: 35.87 sq mi (92.9 km^{2})
  - Water: 0.157 sq mi (0.41 km^{2}) 0.44%

Population (2020)
  - Total: 448
  - Density: 12.5/sq mi (4.82/km^{2})
- Time zone: UTC-6 (CST)
  - Summer (DST): UTC-5 (CDT)
- Area code: 620

New Gottland Township is a township in McPherson County, Kansas, United States.

== History ==
New Gottland Township was organized in 1874.

== Geography ==
New Gottland Township covers an area of 36.027 square miles (93.31 square kilometers).

=== Communities ===
- Johnstown
- New Gottland

=== Adjacent townships ===
- Smoky Hill Township, McPherson County (north)
- Bonaville Township, McPherson County (northeast)
- Delmore Township, McPherson County (east)
- Empire Township, McPherson County (southeast)
- McPherson Township, McPherson County (south)
- Jackson Township, McPherson County (southwest)
- Harper Township, McPherson County (west)
- Union Township, McPherson County (northwest)

=== Major highways ===
- I-135
- US-81
