= K-153 (Kansas highway) =

State highway in Kansas, U.S.

K-153
- K-153 in red, K-153 Spur in blue

Route information
- Maintained by KDOT and the city of McPherson
- Length: 3.451 mi (5.554 km)
- Existed: August 28, 1968–present

Major junctions
- South end: K-61 southwest of McPherson
- North end: US-56 in McPherson

Location
- Country: United States
- State: Kansas
- Counties: McPherson

Highway system
- Kansas State Highway System; Interstate; US; State; Spurs
← K-152	→ K-154

K-153 is a 3.451-mile-long (5.554 km) north–south state highway located entirely within McPherson County in the U.S. state of Kansas. K-153's southern terminus is at a partial interchange with K-61 southwest of McPherson and the northern terminus is at U.S. Route 56 (US-56) in McPherson. K-153 along with K-61 is part of a western bypass of McPherson. The highway has one signed spur route known as K-153 Spur.

Before state highways were numbered in Kansas there were auto trails. The northern terminus closely follows the former National Old Trails Road and Old Santa Fe Trail. The current K-153 Spur and section of K-153 from the spur northward to US-56 was originally a section of US-81. When US-81 was moved onto the new Interstate 35W (I-35W) (modern I-135), the current K-153 was designated K-61 Alternate and the spur was designated K-61 Spur. In a resolution on August 28, 1968, K-153 and K-153 Spur was created when K-61 Alternate was renumbered to K-153 and K-61 Spur was renumbered to K-153 Spur.

== Route description ==
K-153's southern terminus is at K-61 at a partial interchange, where southbound K-153 exits to southbound K-61 and northbound K-61 exits to northbound K-153 only. The highway travels northeast through rural farmlands parallel to the Union Pacific Railroad track. K-153 soon reaches a partial interchange with K-153 Spur, where northbound K-153 Spur exits onto northbound K-153 and southbound K-153 exits onto southbound K-153 Spur. K-153 begins to travel north with the McPherson Airport to the west and an industrial area to the east, then enters the McPherson city limits just north of Iron Horse Road (Refinery Road). The roadway continues north to Kiowa Road and enters into a more commercial area. The highway then crosses over Bull Creek before reaching its northern terminus at US-56 (West Kansas Avenue). The road continues north as McPherson County Route 1961.

K-153 is not included in the National Highway System. The National Highway System is a system of highways important to the nation's defense, economy, and mobility. K-153 does connect to the National Highway System at its southern terminus at K-61 and at its northern terminus at US-56. All but 1.268 miles (2 km) of K-153's alignment is maintained by the Kansas Department of Transportation (KDOT). The entire section of K-153 within McPherson is maintained by the city. KDOT tracks the traffic levels on its highways, and in 2020, they determined that on average the traffic varied from 2,740 vehicles per day south of K-153 Spur to 6,670 vehicles per day north of K-153 Spur.

== History ==
Before state highways were numbered in Kansas there were auto trails, which were an informal network of marked routes that existed in the United States and Canada in the early part of the 20th century. The northern terminus (US-56) closely follows the former National Old Trails Road, which ran from Baltimore and Washington D.C. west to Los Angeles; and Old Santa Fe Trail, which ran from Franklin to Santa Fe.

The current K-153 Spur and section of K-153 from the spur northward to US-56 was originally a section of US-81, and the section of K-153 from K-61 to K-153 spur was originally K-61. In a resolution on August 24, 1966, it was approved to build I-35W (modern I-135) to the east of McPherson and realign US-81 onto it, and a new alignment of K-61 was approved to link to the new I-35W. Also, the former section of US-81 from the new K-61 alignment north to US-56 remained in the state highway system. By August 1968, the new I-35W had been built as well as the new alignment of K-61 to it. What is now K-153 was K-61 Alternate and what is now K-153 Spur was K-61 Spur at the time K-61 was extended. Then in a resolution on August 28, 1968, K-61 Alternate was renumbered to K-153 and K-61 Spur was renumbered to K-153 Spur.

== Major intersections ==
The entire route is in McPherson County.

Location	mi	km	Destinations	Notes
King City Township	0.000	0.000	K-61 south – Hutchinson	Interchange; southern terminus; no access to K-61 north
King City Township	1.874	3.016	K-153 Spur south – Salina, Wichita	Interchange; southbound left exit and northbound left entrance; northern terminus of K-153 Spur
McPherson	3.451	5.554	US-56 (Kansas Avenue) – Lyons, Marion	Northern terminus
McPherson	3.451	5.554	CR 1961 north	Continuation past US-56
1.000 mi = 1.609 km; 1.000 km = 0.621 mi: Incomplete access

== Spur route ==
K-153 Spur
- Location: McPherson County, Kansas
- Length: 1.067 mi (1.717 km)
- Existed: August 28, 1968–present

K-153 Spur is a 1.067-mile-long (1.717 km) spur route of K-153. The southern terminus is at a partial interchange with K-61 southwest of McPherson, where southbound K-153 Spur exits onto northbound K-61 and southbound K-61 exits onto northbound K-153 Spur. South of K-61, K-153 spur continues as McPherson County Route 2043 (Old US-81). The highway proceeds north to its northern terminus at a partial interchange with K-153, where northbound K-153 spur exits onto northbound K-153 and southbound K-153 exits onto southbound K-153 Spur. In 2020, KDOT determined that on average the traffic was 4,010 vehicles per day on K-153 Spur. K-153 Spur was designated through a resolution on August 28, 1968, where K-61 Spur was renumbered to K-153 Spur.

=== Major junctions ===
The entire route is in King City Township, McPherson County.

mi	km	Destinations	Notes
0.000	0.000	K-61 north / CR 2043 south (Old 81 Highway)	Interchange; southern terminus; no access to K-61 south; road continues as CR-2043 (Old 81 Hwy.)
1.067	1.717	K-153 north	Interchange; northern terminus; no access to K-153 south
1.000 mi = 1.609 km; 1.000 km = 0.621 mi: Incomplete access
