= Canton Township, McPherson County, Kansas =

Township in Kansas, United States

Canton Township
- Township
- Location within McPherson County
- Coordinates: 38.38°N 97.40°W
- Country: United States
- State: Kansas
- County: McPherson

Area
  - Total: 35.902 sq mi (92.99 km^{2})
  - Land: 35.864 sq mi (92.89 km^{2})
  - Water: 0.038 sq mi (0.098 km^{2}) 0.11%

Population (2020)
  - Total: 976
  - Density: 27.2/sq mi (10.5/km^{2})
- Time zone: UTC-6 (CST)
  - Summer (DST): UTC-5 (CDT)
- Area code: 620

Canton Township is a township in McPherson County, Kansas, United States.

== History ==
Canton Township was organized in 1874.

== Geography ==
Canton Township covers an area of 35.902 square miles (92.99 square kilometers).

=== Communities ===
- Canton

=== Adjacent townships ===
- Battle Hill Township, McPherson County (north)
- Moore Township, Marion County (northeast)
- Lehigh Township, Marion County (east)
- Menno Township, Marion County (southeast)
- Spring Valley Township, McPherson County (south)
- Lone Tree Township, McPherson County (southwest)
- Empire Township, McPherson County (west)
- Delmore Township, McPherson County (northwest)

=== Major highways ===
- US-56
