= Gypsum Township, Saline County, Kansas =

Township in Saline County, Kansas

Gypsum Township
- Township
- Location within Saline County
- Coordinates: 38°39′10″N 97°25′40″W
- Country: United States
- State: Kansas
- County: Saline
- Established: 1871

Government
  - District 2 County Commissioner: Annie Grevas (R)

Area
  - Total: 35.950 sq mi (93.11 km^{2})
  - Land: 35.948 sq mi (93.10 km^{2})
  - Water: 0.002 sq mi (0.0052 km^{2}) 0.01%

Population (2020)
  - Total: 174
  - Density: 4.84/sq mi (1.87/km^{2})
- Time zone: UTC-6 (CST)
  - Summer (DST): UTC-5 (CDT)
- Area code: 785
- GNIS feature ID: 476973

Gypsum Township is a township in Saline County, Kansas, United States. As of the 2020 census, its population was 174.

== History ==
Gypsum Township was organized in 1871 from Solomon Township. Eureka Township was split off from it in 1873.

== Geography ==
Gypsum Township covers an area of 35.950 square miles (93.11 square kilometers). Gypsum Creek flows through it, as well as Hobbs Creek.

=== Adjacent townships ===
Eureka Township, Saline County
		north	northeast	Wheatland Township, Dickinson County
Liberty Township, Saline County	west	self	east	Holland Township, Dickinson County
Bonaville Township, McPherson County	southwest	south	southeast	Logan Township, Marion County
Gypsum Creek Township, McPherson County

== Transportation ==
=== Major highways ===
- K-4
