= King City Township, Kansas =

Township in McPherson County, Kansas, US

King City Township
- Township
- Location within McPherson County
- Coordinates: 38.3042°N 97.6300°W
- Country: United States
- State: Kansas
- County: McPherson

Area
  - Total: 36.023 sq mi (93.30 km^{2})
  - Land: 35.978 sq mi (93.18 km^{2})
  - Water: 0.045 sq mi (0.12 km^{2}) 0.13%

Population (2020)
  - Total: 506
  - Density: 14.1/sq mi (5.43/km^{2})
- Time zone: UTC-6 (CST)
  - Summer (DST): UTC-5 (CDT)
- Area code: 620

King City Township is a township in McPherson County, Kansas, United States.

== History ==
King City Township was organized in 1874. As of the 2020 census, it had a population of 506.

== Geography ==
King City Township covers an area of 36.023 square miles (93.30 square kilometers).

=== Communities ===
- Elyria

=== Adjacent townships ===
- McPherson Township, McPherson County (north)
- Empire Township, McPherson County (northeast)
- Lone Tree Township, McPherson County (east)
- Turkey Creek Township, McPherson County (south)
- Superior Township, McPherson County (southwest)
- Groveland Township, McPherson County (west)
- Jackson Township, McPherson County (northwest)

=== Major highways ===
- I-135
- US-81
- K-61
- K-153
