= Harper Township, Kansas =

Township in McPherson County, Kansas, US

Harper Township
- Township
- Location within McPherson County
- Coordinates: 38.49°N 97.75°W
- Country: United States
- State: Kansas
- County: McPherson

Area
  - Total: 35.824 sq mi (92.78 km^{2})
  - Land: 35.677 sq mi (92.40 km^{2})
  - Water: 0.147 sq mi (0.38 km^{2}) 0.41%

Population (2020)
  - Total: 132
  - Density: 3.70/sq mi (1.43/km^{2})
- Time zone: UTC-6 (CST)
  - Summer (DST): UTC-5 (CDT)
- Area code(s): 620, 785

Harper Township is a township in McPherson County, Kansas, United States.

== History ==
Harper Township was organized in 1879.

== Geography ==
Harper Township covers an area of 35.824 square miles (92.78 square kilometers). The Smoky Hill River runs through it.

=== Adjacent townships ===
- Union Township, McPherson County (north)
- Smoky Hill Township, McPherson County (northeast)
- New Gottland Township, McPherson County (east)
- McPherson Township, McPherson County (southeast)
- Jackson Township, McPherson County (south)
- Castle Township, McPherson County (southwest)
- South Sharps Creek Township, McPherson County (west)
- Marquette Township, McPherson County (northwest)
