= Elyria, Kansas =

Unincorporated community in McPherson County, Kansas

- Unincorporated community and CDP
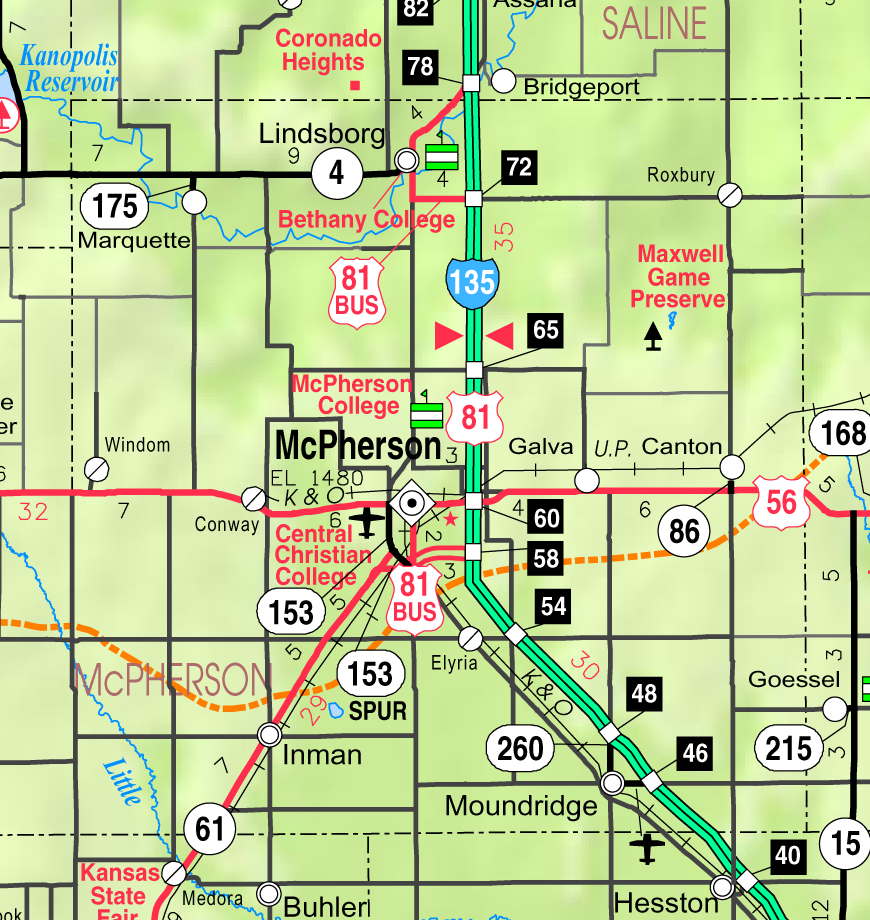
- KDOT map of McPherson County (legend)

- Location within Kansas Location within the United States
- Coordinates: 38°17′26″N 97°37′37″W
- Country: United States
- State: Kansas
- County: McPherson
- Elevation: 1,486 ft (453 m)

Population (2020)
  - Total: 120
- Time zone: UTC-6 (CST)
  - Summer (DST): UTC-5 (CDT)
- Area code: 620
- FIPS code: 20-20975
- GNIS ID: 477316

Elyria is an unincorporated community and census-designated place (CDP) in McPherson County, Kansas, United States. As of the 2020 census, the population was 120. It is located southeast of McPherson at Old U.S. 81 Highway and Comanche Rd.

== History ==
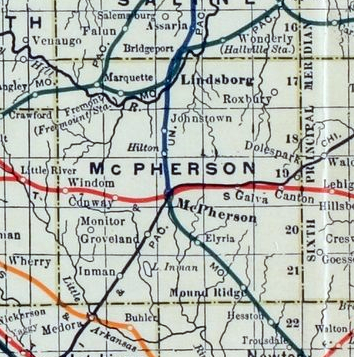
1915 railroad map of McPherson County

=== Early history ===
For many millennia, the Great Plains of North America was inhabited by nomadic Native Americans. From the 16th century to 18th century, the Kingdom of France claimed ownership of large parts of North America. In 1762, after the French and Indian War, France secretly ceded New France to Spain, per the Treaty of Fontainebleau. In 1802, Spain returned most of the land to France, but keeping title to about 7,500 square miles.

=== 19th century ===
In 1803, most of the land for modern day Kansas was acquired by the United States from France as part of the 828,000 square mile Louisiana Purchase for 2.83 cents per acre. In 1848, after the Mexican–American War, the Treaty of Guadalupe Hidalgo with Spain brought into the United States all or part of land for ten future states, including southwestern Kansas. In 1854, the Kansas Territory was organized, then in 1861 Kansas became the 34th U.S. state. In 1867, McPherson County was established within the Kansas Territory, which included the land for modern day Elyria.

Elyria was a shipping point on the Missouri Pacific Railroad. It was named after Elyria, Ohio.

A post office was moved from King City to Elyria in 1887, serving the community until 1954.

== Demographics ==
Historical population
Census	Pop.	Note	%±
2020	120		—
U.S. Decennial Census

== Education ==
A portion of the CDP is within the Moundridge USD 423 public school district while another portion is in the McPherson USD 418 school district.

Elyria is home of the Elyria Christian School, a private elementary and secondary school.

== Transportation ==
The Missouri Pacific Railroad formerly provided passenger rail service along a route from Eldorado to McPherson although this had ended prior to 1946. As of 2025, the nearest passenger rail station is located in Newton, where Amtrak's Southwest Chief stops once daily on a route from Chicago to Los Angeles.
