= K-260 (Kansas highway) =

State highway in Kansas, U.S.

K-260
- K-260 in red

Route information
- Maintained by KDOT
- Length: 3.621 mi (5.827 km)
- Existed: August 24, 1966–present

Major junctions
- North end: I-135 / US-81 north of Moundridge
- East end: I-135 / US-81 east of Moundridge

Location
- Country: United States
- State: Kansas
- Counties: McPherson

Highway system
- Kansas State Highway System; Interstate; US; State; Spurs
← K-259	→ K-261

K-260 is a 3.621-mile-long (5.827 km) east–west state highway through Moundridge in the U.S. State of Kansas. It connects at both ends to Interstate 135 (I-135) and U.S. Route 81 (US-81). The section of K-260 from Moundridge northward is signed north–south and the section from Moundridge westward is signed east–west. The route was first designated in 1966 when US-81 was realigned onto I-35W, now known as I-135.

== Route description ==
The section of K-260 north from Moundridge is signed as north–south and the section west from Moundridge is signed as east–west.

The route begins at exit 48 of I-135 which is concurrent with US-81. From I-135, K-260 heads south along Christian Avenue. The route crosses Buckskin Road and enters the Moundridge city limits. In downtown Moundridge, it turns east at Cole Street. It passes the Moundridge Municipal Airfield and 23rd Avenue as it exits the city and becomes Arrowhead Road. K-260 then ends at exit 46 of I-135 which is concurrent with US-81.

The Kansas Department of Transportation (KDOT) tracks the traffic levels on its highways, and in 2017, they determined that on average the traffic varied from 1610 vehicles per day slightly north of Moundridge to 2160 vehicles per day slightly east of Moundridge. K-260 is not included in the National Highway System. The National Highway System is a system of highways important to the nation's defense, economy, and mobility. K-260 does connect to the National Highway System at each terminus. The entire route is paved with full design bituminous pavement.

== History ==
Before late 1966, US-81 ran through the city of Moundridge. Then in an August 24, 1966 resolution it was approved to realign US-81 onto the new I-35W northwest of Moundridge and K-260 was created to link Moundridge to the new alignment.

== Major intersections ==
The entire route is in Mound Township, McPherson County.

mi	km	Destinations	Notes
0.000	0.000	22nd Avenue	Continuation north past I-135 and US-81
0.000	0.000	I-135 / US-81 – Salina, Wichita	Northern terminus; exit 48 on I-135; diamond interchange
3.621	5.827	I-135 / US-81 – Salina, Wichita	Eastern terminus; exit 46 on I-135; diamond interchange
3.621	5.827	CR 451 east (Arrowhead Road)	Continuation east past I-135 and US-81
1.000 mi = 1.609 km; 1.000 km = 0.621 mi
