= Moundridge High School =

Location
- 526 East Cole Street; Moundridge, Kansas 67107; United States; 38°12′8″N 97°30′42″W

Information
- School type: Public, High School
- School district: USD 423
- Superintendent: George Leary
- CEEB code: 172100
- Principal: Hilarie Hecox
- Athletic Director: Vance Unrau
- Gender: coed
- Website: School Website

Moundridge High School is a public high school in Moundridge, Kansas, United States, and operated by Unified School District 423. Hilarie Hecox is the school's principal and Vance Unrau its athletic director. The mascot is a Wildcat.

== Sports ==
The basketball team's mascot is the wildcat, and the team's colors are black and red.

Alumnus Caleb Hartman established the McPherson Pipeliners baseball team in McPherson County, Kansas. He played well at Moundridge and at McPherson College before becoming a coach.

== See also ==
- List of high schools in Kansas
- List of unified school districts in Kansas
