= Groveland Township, Kansas =

Township in McPherson County, Kansas, US

Groveland Township
- Township
- Location within McPherson County
- Coordinates: 38.30421°N 97.74000°W
- Country: United States
- State: Kansas
- County: McPherson

Area
  - Total: 36.163 sq mi (93.66 km^{2})
  - Land: 36.118 sq mi (93.55 km^{2})
  - Water: 0.045 sq mi (0.12 km^{2}) 0.12%

Population (2020)
  - Total: 170
  - Density: 4.7/sq mi (1.8/km^{2})
- Time zone: UTC-6 (CST)
  - Summer (DST): UTC-5 (CDT)
- Area code: 620

Groveland Township is a township in McPherson County, Kansas, United States.

== History ==
Groveland Township was organized in 1874.

== Geography ==
Groveland Township covers an area of 36.163 square miles (93.66 square kilometers).

=== Communities ===
- Groveland

=== Adjacent townships ===
- Jackson Township, McPherson County (north)
- McPherson Township, McPherson County (northeast)
- King City Township, McPherson County (east)
- Superior Township, McPherson County (south)
- Little Valley Township, McPherson County (southwest)
- Hayes Township, McPherson County (west)
- Castle Township, McPherson County (northwest)

=== Major highways ===
- K-61
