= Mound Township, McPherson County, Kansas =

Township in McPherson County, Kansas, US

Mound Township
- Township
- Location within McPherson County
- Coordinates: 38.23°N 97.52°W
- Country: United States
- State: Kansas
- County: McPherson

Area
  - Total: 35.843 sq mi (92.83 km^{2})
  - Land: 35.784 sq mi (92.68 km^{2})
  - Water: 0.059 sq mi (0.15 km^{2}) 0.16%

Population (2020)
  - Total: 2,326
  - Density: 65.00/sq mi (25.10/km^{2})
- Time zone: UTC-6 (CST)
  - Summer (DST): UTC-5 (CDT)
- Area code: 620

Mound Township is a township in McPherson County, Kansas, United States.

== History ==
Mound Township was organized in 1874.

== Geography ==
Mound Township covers an area of 35.843 square miles (92.83 square kilometers).

=== Communities ===
- Moundridge

=== Adjacent townships ===
- Lone Tree Township, McPherson County (north)
- Spring Valley Township, McPherson County (northeast)
- Meridian Township, McPherson County (east)
- Emma Township, Harvey County (southeast)
- Garden Township, Harvey County (south)
- Alta Township, Harvey County (southwest)
- Turkey Creek Township, McPherson County (west)

=== Major highways ===
- I-135
- US-81
- K-260
