= Superior Township, McPherson County, Kansas =

Township in McPherson County, Kansas, US

Superior Township
- Township
- Location within McPherson County
- Coordinates: 38.217°N 97.757°W
- Country: United States
- State: Kansas
- County: McPherson
- Established: 1874

Area
  - Total: 35.855 sq mi (92.86 km^{2})
  - Land: 35.598 sq mi (92.20 km^{2})
  - Water: 0.257 sq mi (0.67 km^{2}) 0.72%

Population (2020)
  - Total: 1,681
  - Density: 47.22/sq mi (18.23/km^{2})
- Time zone: UTC-6 (CST)
  - Summer (DST): UTC-5 (CDT)
- Area code: 620

Superior Township is a township in McPherson County, Kansas, United States.

== History ==
Superior Township was organized in 1874.

== Geography ==
Superior Township covers an area of 35.855 square miles (92.86 square kilometers). Lake Inman lies within the township.

=== Communities ===
- Inman

=== Adjacent townships ===
- Groveland Township, McPherson County (north)
- King City Township, McPherson County (northeast)
- Turkey Creek Township, McPherson County (east)
- Alta Township, Harvey County (southeast)
- Little River Township, Reno County (south)
- Medora Township, Reno County (southwest)
- Little Valley Township, McPherson County (west)

=== Major highways ===
- K-61
