= Smoky Hill Township, McPherson County, Kansas =

Township in McPherson County, Kansas, U.S.

Smoky Hill Township
- Township
- Location within McPherson County
- Coordinates: 38.563866°N 97.64625°W
- Country: United States
- State: Kansas
- County: McPherson

Area
  - Total: 34.113 sq mi (88.35 km^{2})
  - Land: 33.916 sq mi (87.84 km^{2})
  - Water: 0.197 sq mi (0.51 km^{2}) 0.58%

Population (2020)
  - Total: 316
  - Density: 9.32/sq mi (3.60/km^{2})
- Time zone: UTC-6 (CST)
  - Summer (DST): UTC-5 (CDT)
- Area code(s): 620, 785

Smoky Hill Township is a township in McPherson County, Kansas, United States. As of the 2020 census, its population was 316. The city of Lindsborg is completely surrounded by the township.

== Geography ==
Smoky Hill Township covers an area of 34.113 square miles (88.35 square kilometers). The Smoky Hill River flows through it.

=== Adjacent townships ===
- Smoky View Township, Saline County (north)
- Liberty Township, Saline County (northeast)
- Bonaville Township, McPherson County (east)
- Delmore Township, McPherson County (southeast)
- New Gottland Township, McPherson County (south)
- Harper Township, McPherson County (southwest)
- Union Township, McPherson County (west)
- Falun Township, Saline County (northwest)

=== Major highways ===
- I-135
- US-81
- K-4
