= Empire Township, McPherson County, Kansas =

Township in McPherson County, Kansas, US

Empire Township
- Township
- Location within McPherson County
- Coordinates: 38.38°N 97.52°W
- Country: United States
- State: Kansas
- County: McPherson

Area
  - Total: 36.159 sq mi (93.65 km^{2})
  - Land: 36.159 sq mi (93.65 km^{2})
  - Water: 0 sq mi (0 km^{2}) 0%

Population (2020)
  - Total: 1,253
  - Density: 34.65/sq mi (13.38/km^{2})
- Time zone: UTC-6 (CST)
  - Summer (DST): UTC-5 (CDT)
- Area code: 620

Empire Township is a township in McPherson County, Kansas, United States.

== History ==
Empire Township was organized in 1874.

== Geography ==
Empire Township covers an area of 36.159 square miles (93.65 square kilometers).

=== Communities ===
- Galva

=== Adjacent townships ===
- Delmore Township, McPherson County (north)
- Battle Hill Township, McPherson County (northeast)
- Canton Township, McPherson County (east)
- Spring Valley Township, McPherson County (southeast)
- Lone Tree Township, McPherson County (south)
- King City Township, McPherson County (southwest)
- McPherson Township, McPherson County (west)
- New Gottland Township, McPherson County (northwest)
