= Turkey Creek Township, McPherson County, Kansas =

Township in McPherson County, Kansas, U.S.

Turkey Creek Township
- Township
- Location within McPherson County
- Coordinates: 38.217372°N 97.647042°W
- Country: United States
- State: Kansas
- County: McPherson

Area
  - Total: 35.734 sq mi (92.55 km^{2})
  - Land: 35.734 sq mi (92.55 km^{2})
  - Water: 0 sq mi (0 km^{2}) 0%

Population (2020)
  - Total: 275
  - Density: 7.70/sq mi (2.97/km^{2})
- Time zone: UTC-6 (CST)
  - Summer (DST): UTC-5 (CDT)
- Area code: 620

Turkey Creek Township is a township in McPherson County, Kansas, United States. As of the 2020 census, its population was 275.

== Geography ==
Turkey Creek Township covers an area of 35.734 square miles (92.55 square kilometers).

=== Adjacent townships ===
- King City Township, McPherson County (north)
- Lone Tree Township, McPherson County (northeast)
- Mound Township, McPherson County (east)
- Garden Township, Harvey County, Kansas (southeast)
- Alta Township, Harvey County (south)
- Little River Township, Reno County (southwest)
- Superior Township, McPherson County (west)
