= K260 =

K260 or K-260 may refer to:

- K-260 (Kansas highway), a state highway in Kansas
- K260AM, a radio station
