= Jackson Township, McPherson County, Kansas =

Township in McPherson County, Kansas, US

Jackson Township
- Township
- Location within McPherson County
- Coordinates: 38.38°N 97.75°W
- Country: United States
- State: Kansas
- County: McPherson

Area
  - Total: 35.817 sq mi (92.77 km^{2})
  - Land: 35.637 sq mi (92.30 km^{2})
  - Water: 0.18 sq mi (0.47 km^{2}) 0.50%

Population (2020)
  - Total: 174
  - Density: 4.88/sq mi (1.89/km^{2})
- Time zone: UTC-6 (CST)
  - Summer (DST): UTC-5 (CDT)
- Area code: 620

Jackson Township is a township in McPherson County, Kansas, United States.

== History ==
Jackson Township was organized in 1874.

== Geography ==
Jackson Township covers an area of 35.817 square miles (92.77 square kilometers).

=== Communities ===
- Conway

=== Adjacent townships ===
- Harper Township, McPherson County (north)
- New Gottland Township, McPherson County (northeast)
- McPherson Township, McPherson County (east)
- King City Township, McPherson County (southeast)
- Groveland Township, McPherson County (south)
- Hayes Township, McPherson County (southwest)
- Castle Township, McPherson County (west)
- South Sharps Creek Township, McPherson County (northwest)

=== Major highways ===
- US-56
