= Delmore Township, Kansas =

Township in McPherson County, Kansas, US

Delmore Township
- Township
- Location within McPherson County
- Coordinates: 38.48°N 97.53°W
- Country: United States
- State: Kansas
- County: McPherson

Area
  - Total: 35.938 sq mi (93.08 km^{2})
  - Land: 35.827 sq mi (92.79 km^{2})
  - Water: 0.111 sq mi (0.29 km^{2}) 0.31%

Population (2020)
  - Total: 194
  - Density: 5.41/sq mi (2.09/km^{2})
- Time zone: UTC-6 (CST)
  - Summer (DST): UTC-5 (CDT)
- Area code: 620

Delmore Township is a township in McPherson County, Kansas, United States.

== History ==
Delmore Township was organized in 1874.

== Geography ==
Delmore Township covers an area of 35.938 square miles (93.08 square kilometers).

=== Adjacent townships ===
- Bonaville Township, McPherson County (north)
- Gypsum Creek Township, McPherson County (northeast)
- Battle Hill Township, McPherson County (east)
- Canton Township, McPherson County (southeast)
- Empire Township, McPherson County (south)
- McPherson Township, McPherson County (southwest)
- New Gottland Township, McPherson County (west)
- Smoky Hill Township, McPherson County (northwest)
