= McPherson Township, McPherson County, Kansas =

Township in McPherson County, Kansas, US

McPherson Township
- Township
- Location within McPherson County
- Coordinates: 38.38°N 97.65°W
- Country: United States
- State: Kansas
- County: McPherson

Area
  - Total: 28.137 sq mi (72.87 km^{2})
  - Land: 28.067 sq mi (72.69 km^{2})
  - Water: 0.07 sq mi (0.18 km^{2}) 0.25%

Population (2020)
  - Total: 530
  - Density: 19/sq mi (7.3/km^{2})
- Time zone: UTC-6 (CST)
  - Summer (DST): UTC-5 (CDT)
- Area code: 620

McPherson Township is a township in McPherson County, Kansas, United States.

== History ==
McPherson Township was organized in 1874.

== Geography ==
McPherson Township covers an area of 28.137 square miles (72.87 square kilometers).

=== Adjacent townships ===
- New Gottland Township, McPherson County (north)
- Delmore Township, McPherson County (northeast)
- Empire Township, McPherson County (east)
- Lone Tree Township, McPherson County (southeast)
- King City Township, McPherson County (south)
- Groveland Township, McPherson County (southwest)
- Jackson Township, McPherson County (west)
- Harper Township, McPherson County (northwest)

=== Major highways ===
- I-135
- US-56
- US-81
