= Bonaville Township, Kansas =

Township in Kansas, U.S.

Bonaville Township
- Township
- Location within McPherson County
- Coordinates: 38.565465°N 97.537614°W
- Country: United States
- State: Kansas
- County: McPherson

Area
  - Total: 36.003 sq mi (93.25 km^{2})
  - Land: 35.849 sq mi (92.85 km^{2})
  - Water: 0.154 sq mi (0.40 km^{2}) 0.43%

Population (2020)
  - Total: 82
  - Density: 2.3/sq mi (0.88/km^{2})
- Time zone: UTC-6 (CST)
  - Summer (DST): UTC-5 (CDT)
- Area code: 620

Bonaville Township is a township in McPherson County, Kansas, United States.

== History ==
Bonaville Township was organized in 1874.

== Geography ==
Bonaville Township covers an area of 36.003 square miles (93.25 square kilometers).

=== Adjacent townships ===
- Liberty Township, Saline County (north)
- Gypsum Township, Saline County (northeast)
- Gypsum Creek Township, McPherson County (east)
- Battle Hill Township, McPherson County (southeast)
- Delmore Township, McPherson County (south)
- New Gottland Township, McPherson County (southwest)
- Smoky Hill Township, McPherson County (west)
- Smoky View Township, Saline County (northwest)
