= Anna Larkin =

American sculptor

Anna Larkin (1855–1939) was a Swedish-born American folk sculptor.

Larkin, born Anna Elisabet Jonsdotter, began carving when she was seven years old, and at ten sold a carving of a horse to a sea captain for $10, a transaction which inspired her to pursue her passion for art. She became well known in Sweden, eventually selling a pair of model horses to King Oscar II. Her work won many prizes and she taught a great deal. With her children, Jonsdotter, now known as Johnson, emigrated to the United States in 1887. The family settled in Arkansas City, Kansas for a time. Later she married John Larkin, and the couple moved to McPherson, Kansas, where she resided until her death. A large collection of Larkin's work belongs to the McPherson Museum; the Grassroots Art Center in Lucas contains examples of her sculpture as well.

Larkin favored varieties of pine, especially white pine and sugar pine, when carving her pieces, and an average sculpture took about two days to carve. After cutting the rough shape, the next day she would use a paring knife to develop the details of the work, finishing by rubbing it with a piece of glass and two grades of sandpaper.
