= Smoky View Township, Kansas =

Township in Saline County, Kansas, U.S.

Smoky View Township
- Township
- Location within Saline County
- Coordinates: 38.6603°N 97.6408°W
- Country: United States
- State: Kansas
- County: Saline
- Established: 1876

Government
  - District 4 County Commissioner: James Weese (R)

Area
  - Total: 36.044 sq mi (93.35 km^{2})
  - Land: 36.036 sq mi (93.33 km^{2})
  - Water: 0.008 sq mi (0.021 km^{2}) 0.02%

Population (2020)
  - Total: 848
  - Density: 23.5/sq mi (9.09/km^{2})
- Time zone: UTC-6 (CST)
  - Summer (DST): UTC-5 (CDT)
- Area code: 785
- GNIS feature ID: 476949

Smoky View Township is a township in Saline County, Kansas, United States. As of the 2020 census, its population was 848.

== History ==
Smoky View Township was organized in 1876 from Walnut Township. In 1868, Swedish settlers from Galesburg, Illinois settled in Smokey View and Smolan Townships.

== Geography ==
Smoky View Township covers an area of 36.044 square miles (93.35 square kilometers). The Smoky Hill River flows through it, as well as Kentucky Creek. Coronado Heights is also located within the township.

=== Communities ===
- Assaria
- Bridgeport
- Salemsborg

=== Adjacent townships ===
Smolan Township, Saline County
		north	northeast	Walnut Township, Saline County
Falun Township, Saline County	west	self	east	Liberty Township, Saline County
Union Township, McPherson County	southwest	south	southeast	Bonaville Township, McPherson County
Smoky Hill Township, McPherson County

== Transportation ==
=== Major highways ===
- I-135
- US-81
- K-4
