= Spring Valley Township, McPherson County, Kansas =

Township in McPherson County, Kansas, US

Spring Valley Township
- Township
- Location within McPherson County
- Coordinates: 38°18′14″N 97°25′37″W
- Country: United States
- State: Kansas
- County: McPherson
- Established: 1874

Area
  - Total: 36.124 sq mi (93.56 km^{2})
  - Land: 36.115 sq mi (93.54 km^{2})
  - Water: 0.009 sq mi (0.023 km^{2}) 0.02%

Population (2020)
  - Total: 316
  - Density: 8.75/sq mi (3.38/km^{2})
- Time zone: UTC-6 (CST)
  - Summer (DST): UTC-5 (CDT)
- Area code: 620

Spring Valley Township is a township in McPherson County, Kansas, United States.

== History ==
Spring Valley Township was organized in 1874.

== Geography ==
Spring Valley Township covers an area of 36.124 square miles (93.56 square kilometers).

=== Adjacent townships ===
- Canton Township, McPherson County (north)
- Lehigh Township, Marion County (northeast)
- Menno Township, Marion County (east)
- West Branch Township, Marion County (southeast)
- Meridian Township, McPherson County (south)
- Mound Township, McPherson County (southwest)
- Lone Tree Township, McPherson County (west)
- Empire Township, McPherson County (northwest)
