= Union Township, McPherson County, Kansas =

Township in McPherson County, Kansas, US

Union Township
- Township
- Location within McPherson County
- Coordinates: 38.5753°N 97.7511°W
- Country: United States
- State: Kansas
- County: McPherson
- Established: 1874

Area
  - Total: 36.097 sq mi (93.49 km^{2})
  - Land: 35.898 sq mi (92.98 km^{2})
  - Water: 0.199 sq mi (0.52 km^{2}) 0.55%

Population (2020)
  - Total: 190
  - Density: 5.3/sq mi (2.0/km^{2})
- Time zone: UTC-6 (CST)
  - Summer (DST): UTC-5 (CDT)
- Area code(s): 785, 620

Union Township is a township in McPherson County, Kansas, United States.

== History ==
Union Township was organized in 1874.

== Geography ==
Union Township covers an area of 36.097 square miles (93.49 square kilometers). The Smoky Hill River flows through it.

=== Adjacent townships ===
- Falun Township, Saline County (north)
- Smoky View Township, Saline County (northeast)
- Smoky Hill Township, McPherson County (east)
- New Gottland Township, McPherson County (southeast)
- Harper Township, McPherson County, Kansas (south)
- South Sharps Creek Township, McPherson County (southwest)
- Marquette Township, McPherson County (west)

=== Major highways ===
- K-4
