= Lone Tree Township, McPherson County, Kansas =

Township in McPherson County, Kansas, US

Lone Tree Township
- Township
- Location within McPherson County
- Coordinates: 38.3044°N 97.5100°W
- Country: United States
- State: Kansas
- County: McPherson

Area
  - Total: 36.222 sq mi (93.81 km^{2})
  - Land: 36.222 sq mi (93.81 km^{2})
  - Water: 0 sq mi (0 km^{2}) 0%

Population (2020)
  - Total: 467
  - Density: 12.9/sq mi (4.98/km^{2})
- Time zone: UTC-6 (CST)
  - Summer (DST): UTC-5 (CDT)
- Area code: 620

Lone Tree Township is a township in McPherson County, Kansas, United States.

== History ==
Lone Tree Township was organized in 1874.

== Geography ==
Lone Tree Township covers an area of 36.222 square miles (93.81 square kilometers).

=== Adjacent townships ===
- Empire Township, McPherson County (north)
- Canton Township, McPherson County (northeast)
- Spring Valley Township, McPherson County (east)
- Mound Township, McPherson County (south)
- Turkey Creek Township, McPherson County (southwest)
- King City Township, McPherson County (west)
- McPherson Township, McPherson County (northwest)

=== Major highways ===
- I-135
- US-81
