= McPherson Valley Wetlands =

Protected lands in Kansas, U.S.

- Location within Kansas
- Location: McPherson County, Kansas
- Nearest city: McPherson, Kansas
- Coordinates: 38°28′38″N 97°27′03″W
- Area: 4,455 acres (1,803 ha)
- Governing body: State of Kansas

The McPherson Valley Wetlands are a disconnected chain of marshes, wetlands, and shallow lakes in McPherson County, Kansas. Once covering a much larger area, 4,455 acres of the wetlands and surrounding prairie was protected by the Kansas Department of Wildlife, Parks, and Tourism as of 2011.

== History and description ==
The McPherson Valley Wetlands are a large area of scattered natural lakes and wetlands extending from five miles northwest of McPherson, Kansas for 43 miles south to Valley Center. In the late 19th century, the wetlands consisted of 52 shallow marshes comprising more than 9,000 acres of water. The largest marsh was Big Basin, more than 2,000 acres in size. None of the marshes were more than five feet deep and many of them became dry land during the frequent droughts in the area. Two lakes, Lake Inman and Farland Lake, were among the marshes. Lake Inman, more than 100 acres in size, is Kansas's largest natural lake. The lake is in private ownership.

The wetlands were first important for waterfowl hunters who, in the last quarter of the 19th century, killed tens of thousands of ducks and other birds and shipped them by railroad to Kansas City and St. Louis. About 1900, draining of the marshes converted most of the wetlands into farmland. However, most of the land was too low and wet to become good farmland. In 1989, the Kansas Department of Wildlife and Parks began purchasing the former marshland and restoring it to its original condition using levees, canals, and water pumps. As of 2011, 4,455 acres of land had been purchased, including 1,760 acres of 51 wetlands, including Big Basin, Kubin, Little Sinkhole, and Chain of Lakes marshes had been restored or recreated. The state of Kansas continues to purchase land from willing sellers when funds are available.

Before being drained, the McPherson Valley Wetlands were comparable in importance to Cheyenne Bottoms, 60 miles west, for migrating waterfowl. More than 200 species of birds have been recorded in the wetlands, including white-faced ibis, snowy plover, peregrine falcons, and many species of ducks.

In 1995, for the first time in 100 years, whooping cranes visited the wetlands. In spring 2016, 17 whooping cranes visited the Big Basin marshes. In summer 2017, a roseate spoonbill visited the Little Sinkhole marshes.

== Recreation ==
The wetlands are open to the public year-round. Hunting for both waterfowl and upland game birds is allowed with a permit. Steel shot is required for all hunting. Lead shot is not allowed to prevent waterfowl from consuming lead while feeding. Bird watching is a major activity. Camping is not allowed.

The McPherson wetlands property is regularly patrolled by State Game Wardens employed by the Kansas Department of Wildlife, Parks, and Tourism. The wardens enforce all state laws on the property and check hunters for permits.
