= Carlton, Kansas =

City in Dickinson County, Kansas

- City
- Location within Dickinson County and Kansas

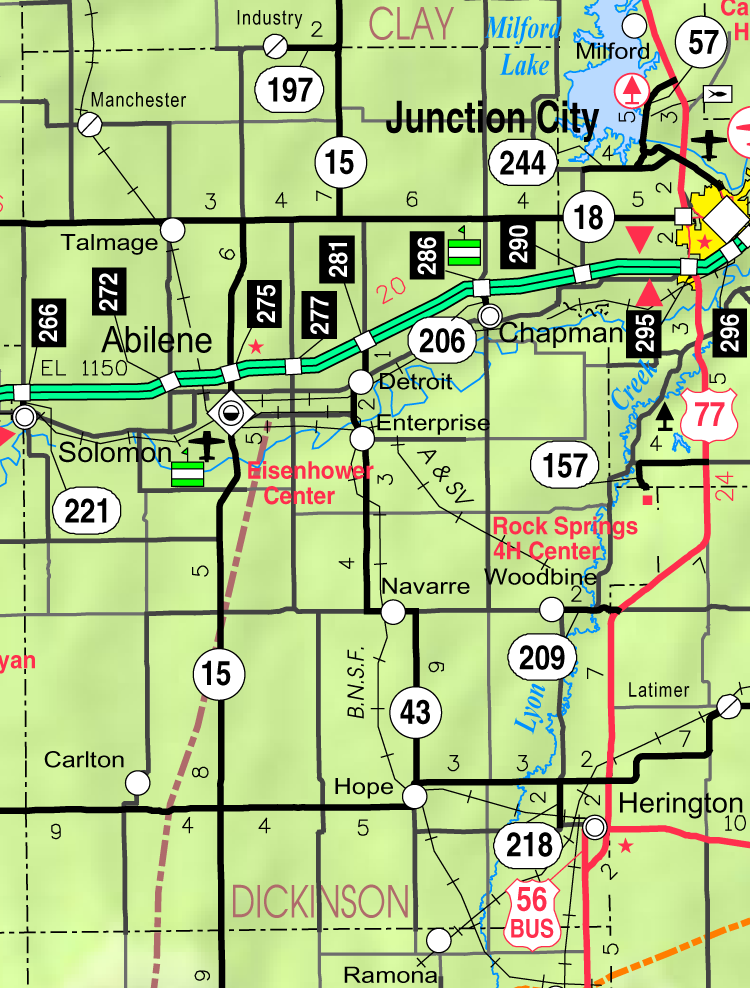
- KDOT map of Dickinson County (legend)
- Coordinates: 38°41′12″N 97°17′35″W
- Country: United States
- State: Kansas
- County: Dickinson

Government
  - Type: Mayor–Council

Area
  - Total: 0.17 sq mi (0.44 km^{2})
  - Land: 0.17 sq mi (0.44 km^{2})
  - Water: 0 sq mi (0.00 km^{2})
- Elevation: 1,316 ft (401 m)

Population (2020)
  - Total: 40
  - Density: 240/sq mi (91/km^{2})
- Time zone: UTC-6 (CST)
  - Summer (DST): UTC-5 (CDT)
- ZIP Code: 67448
- Area code: 785
- FIPS code: 20-10675
- GNIS ID: 2393748

Carlton is a city in Dickinson County, Kansas, United States. As of the 2020 census, the population of the city was 40.

== History ==
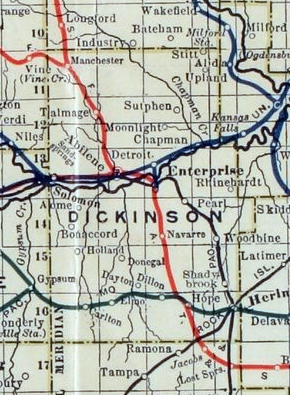
1915 railroad map of Dickinson County

=== Early history ===
For many millennia, the Great Plains of North America was inhabited by nomadic Native Americans. From the 16th century to 18th century, the Kingdom of France claimed ownership of large parts of North America. In 1762, after the French and Indian War, France secretly ceded New France to Spain, per the Treaty of Fontainebleau.

=== 19th century ===
In 1802, Spain returned most of the land to France. In 1803, most of the land for modern day Kansas was acquired by the United States from France as part of the 828,000 square mile Louisiana Purchase for 2.83 cents per acre.

In 1854, the Kansas Territory was organized, then in 1861 Kansas became the 34th U.S. state. In 1857, Dickinson County was established within the Kansas Territory, which included the land for modern day Carlton.

Carlton was a station and shipping point on the Missouri Pacific Railroad.

A post office was opened in Carlton in 1872, and remained in operation until it was discontinued in 1995.

== Geography ==
According to the United States Census Bureau, the city has a total area of 0.17 square miles (0.44 km^{2}), all land.

== Demographics ==
Historical population
Census	Pop.	Note	%±
1890	121		—
1930	138		—
1940	101		−26.8%
1950	76		−24.8%
1960	78		2.6%
1970	40		−48.7%
1980	49		22.5%
1990	39		−20.4%
2000	38		−2.6%
2010	42		10.5%
2020	40		−4.8%
U.S. Decennial Census

=== 2020 census ===
The 2020 United States census counted 40 people, 15 households, and 11 families in Carlton. The population density was 235.3 per square mile (90.8/km^{2}). There were 19 housing units at an average density of 111.8 per square mile (43.2/km^{2}). The racial makeup was 92.5% (37) white or European American (92.5% non-Hispanic white), 0.0% (0) black or African-American, 0.0% (0) Native American or Alaska Native, 0.0% (0) Asian, 0.0% (0) Pacific Islander or Native Hawaiian, 2.5% (1) from other races, and 5.0% (2) from two or more races. Hispanic or Latino of any race was 0.0% (0) of the population.

Of the 15 households, 6.7% had children under the age of 18; 73.3% were married couples living together; 13.3% had a female householder with no spouse or partner present. 26.7% of households consisted of individuals and 13.3% had someone living alone who was 65 years of age or older. The average household size was 2.1 and the average family size was 2.4. The percent of those with a bachelor's degree or higher was estimated to be 5.0% of the population.

22.5% of the population was under the age of 18, 5.0% from 18 to 24, 17.5% from 25 to 44, 30.0% from 45 to 64, and 25.0% who were 65 years of age or older. The median age was 46.0 years. For every 100 females, there were 81.8 males. For every 100 females ages 18 and older, there were 82.4 males.

The 2016–2020 5-year American Community Survey estimates show that the median household income was $48,750 (with a margin of error of +/- $12,478) and the median family income was $47,917 (+/- $20,612). Males had a median income of $48,750 (+/- $17,380). The median income for those above 16 years old was $48,125 (+/- $22,897).

=== 2010 census ===
As of the census of 2010, there were 42 people, 16 households, and 14 families living in the city. The population density was 247.1 inhabitants per square mile (95.4/km^{2}). There were 20 housing units at an average density of 117.6 per square mile (45.4/km^{2}). The racial makeup of the city was 100.0% White.

There were 16 households, of which 37.5% had children under the age of 18 living with them, 81.3% were married couples living together, 6.3% had a female householder with no husband present, and 12.5% were non-families. 12.5% of all households were made up of individuals, and 6.3% had someone living alone who was 65 years of age or older. The average household size was 2.63 and the average family size was 2.86.

The median age in the city was 46.5 years. 28.6% of residents were under the age of 18; 0.0% were between the ages of 18 and 24; 19.1% were from 25 to 44; 26.1% were from 45 to 64; and 26.2% were 65 years of age or older. The gender makeup of the city was 52.4% male and 47.6% female.

=== 2000 census ===
As of the census of 2000, there were 38 people, 16 households, and 11 families living in the city. The population density was 232.0 inhabitants per square mile (89.6/km^{2}). There were 20 housing units at an average density of 122.1 per square mile (47.1/km^{2}). The racial makeup of the city was 100.00% White.

There were 16 households, out of which 31.3% had children under the age of 18 living with them, 62.5% were married couples living together, 6.3% had a female householder with no husband present, and 31.3% were non-families. 31.3% of all households were made up of individuals, and 6.3% had someone living alone who was 65 years of age or older. The average household size was 2.38 and the average family size was 2.91.

In the city, the population was spread out, with 23.7% under the age of 18, 5.3% from 18 to 24, 34.2% from 25 to 44, 23.7% from 45 to 64, and 13.2% who were 65 years of age or older. The median age was 39 years. For every 100 females, there were 100.0 males. For every 100 females age 18 and over, there were 107.1 males.

The median income for a household in the city was $33,125, and the median income for a family was $33,125. Males had a median income of $22,188 versus $13,750 for females. The per capita income for the city was $9,750. None of the population and none of the families were below the poverty line.

== Education ==
The community is served by Chapman USD 473 public school district. The Chapman High School mascot is Chapman Fighting Irish.

== See also ==
- Holland Township, Dickinson County, Kansas
