= McPherson County, Kansas =

County in Kansas, United States

- County
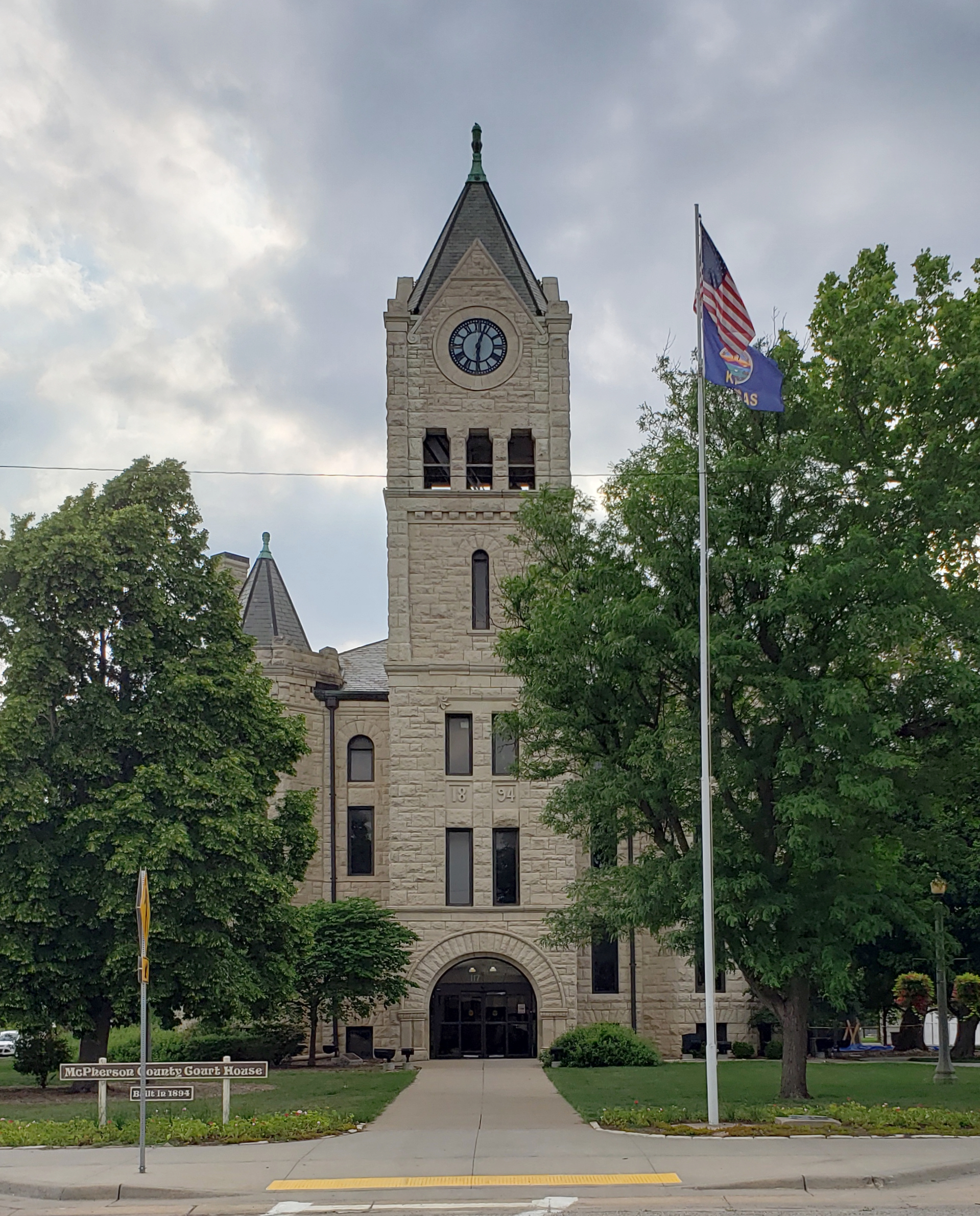
- McPherson County Courthouse in McPherson (2023)

- Location within the U.S. state of Kansas
- Coordinates: 38°24′N 97°42′W
- Country: United States
- State: Kansas
- Founded: February 26, 1867
- Named for: James B. McPherson
- Seat: McPherson
- Largest city: McPherson

Area
  - Total: 901 sq mi (2,330 km^{2})
  - Land: 898 sq mi (2,330 km^{2})
  - Water: 2.3 sq mi (6.0 km^{2}) 0.3%

Population (2020)
  - Total: 30,223
  - Estimate (2025): 30,064 ▼
  - Density: 33.7/sq mi (13.0/km^{2})
- Time zone: UTC−6 (Central)
  - Summer (DST): UTC−5 (CDT)
- Congressional district: 1st
- Website: mcphersoncountyks.us

McPherson County is a county located in the U.S. state of Kansas. Its county seat and largest city is McPherson. As of the 2020 census, the county population was 30,223. The county was named for James McPherson, a general in the Civil War.

== History ==
=== Early history ===
For many millennia, the Great Plains of North America were inhabited by nomadic Native Americans. From the 16th century to 18th century, the Kingdom of France claimed ownership of large parts of North America. In 1762, after the French and Indian War, France secretly ceded New France to Spain, per the Treaty of Fontainebleau. In 1802, Spain returned most of the land to France, but keeping title to about 7,500 square miles.

In 1803, most of the land for modern day Kansas was acquired by the United States from France as part of the 828,000 square mile Louisiana Purchase for 2.83 cents per acre. In 1848, after the Mexican–American War, the Treaty of Guadalupe Hidalgo with Spain brought into the United States all or part of land for ten future states, including southwestern Kansas. In 1854, the Kansas Territory was organized, then in 1861 Kansas became the 34th U.S. state.

=== 19th century ===
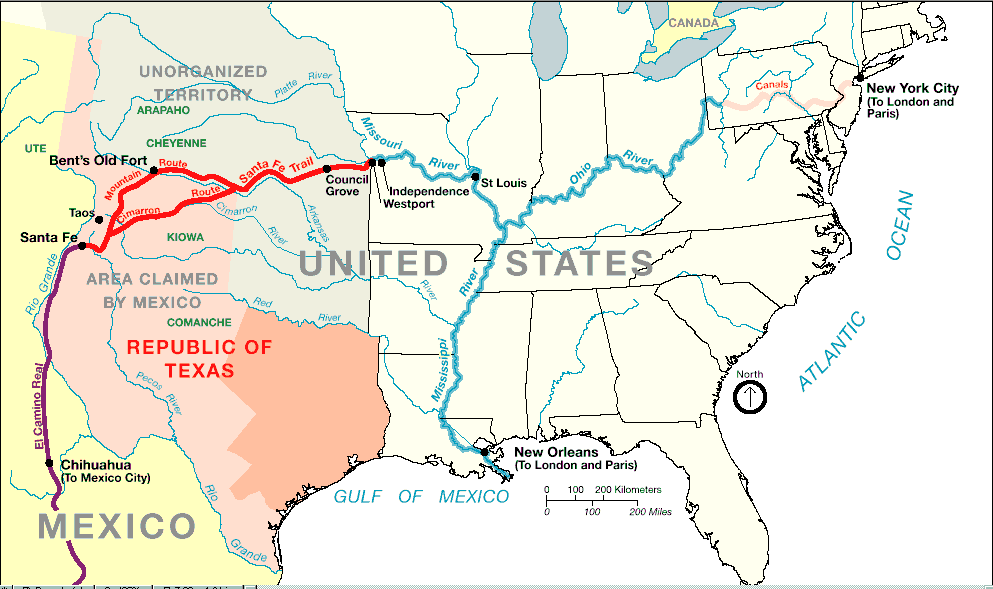
1845 Santa Fe Trail crossing McPherson County

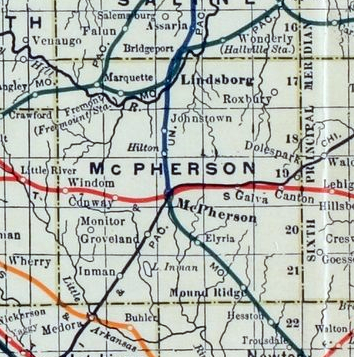
1915–1918 railroad map of McPherson County

From the 1820s to 1870s, the Santa Fe Trail passed through, what is now McPherson County. The trail entered the county, east of Canton, then south of Galva, then north of Inman, and west towards Lyons. In 1855, Charles O. Fuller established a ranch adjacent to the Running Turkey Creek Crossing about two miles south and one mile east of Galva. Fuller's Ranch provided accommodations for travelers on the Santa Fe Trail and was probably the first white settlement in McPherson County.

From 1860 to 1865, McPherson County was part of Peketon County. On February 17, 1865, Peketon County was abolished, and McPherson County was made a part of Marion County, which extended from the west line of Chase County to the present western boundary of Kansas.

In 1868, Solomon Stephens and L. N. Holmberg were appointed Justices of the Peace—the first officers in what is now McPherson County. The next year (1869) occurred the first election for the township, now the county of McPherson. McPherson was regularly organized as a county in the spring of 1870, a mass meeting being held at Sweadal. Sweadal, the county seat thus selected, was located about one mile and a half southwest of the present site of Lindsborg. In September, however, the County Commissioners resolved to meet at the latter place, McPherson which had already been located some two years.

In April 1873, a petition was filed for the county seat re-location. It was signed by 483 voters, and a special election was accordingly ordered for June 10. Upon that day, McPherson received 605 votes, New Gottland 325, King City 3 and Lindsborg 1; McPherson's majority over all, 276. In May the McPherson Town Company had offered, as an inducement for the location of the county seat at this point, the free use of rooms for ten years, and the donation of two squares of land on the town site. The offer was accepted the next month, the County Commissioners selecting blocks 56 and 65. Thus the county seat was established at McPherson and has remained since.

As early as 1875, city leaders of Marion held a meeting to consider a branch railroad from Florence. In 1878, Atchison, Topeka and Santa Fe Railway and parties from Marion County and McPherson County chartered the Marion and McPherson Railway Company. In 1879, a branch line was built from Florence to McPherson; in 1880 it was extended to Lyons and in 1881 was extended to Ellinwood. The line was leased and operated by the Atchison, Topeka and Santa Fe Railway. The line from Florence to Marion was abandoned in 1968. In 1992, the line from Marion to McPherson was sold to Central Kansas Railway. In 1993, after heavy flood damage, the line from Marion to McPherson was abandoned. The original branch line connected Florence, Marion, Canada, Hillsboro, Lehigh, Canton, Galva, McPherson, Conway, Windom, Little River, Mitchell, Lyons and Chase, then connected with the original AT&SF main line at Ellinwood.

In 1887, the Chicago, Kansas and Nebraska Railway extended its main line from Herington to Pratt. This main line connected Herington, Ramona, Tampa, Durham, Waldeck, Canton, Galva, McPherson, Groveland, Inman, Medora, Hutchinson, Whiteside, Partridge, Arlington, Langdon, Turon, Preston, Natrona and Pratt. In 1888, this main line was extended to Liberal. Later, this line was extended to Tucumcari, New Mexico and Santa Rosa, New Mexico, where it made a connection with the Southern Pacific from El Paso, Texas. The Chicago, Kansas and Nebraska Railway was absorbed by the Chicago, Rock Island and Pacific Railway. This line is also called the "Golden State Route".

=== 20th century ===
The National Old Trails Road, also known as the Ocean-to-Ocean Highway, was established in 1912, and was routed through Windom, Conway and McPherson.

== Geography ==
Windom, Kansas in McPherson County during the early 20th century

According to the U.S. Census Bureau, the county has a total area of 901 square miles (2,330 km^{2}), of which 898 square miles (2,330 km^{2}) is land and 2.3 square miles (6.0 km^{2}) (0.3%) is water.

=== Adjacent counties ===
- Saline County (north)
- Dickinson County (northeast)
- Marion County (east)
- Harvey County (southeast)
- Reno County (southwest)
- Rice County (west)
- Ellsworth County (northwest)

=== Major highways ===
- I-135
- US-56
- US-81
- K-4
- K-61
- K-153

== Demographics ==
Historical population
Census	Pop.	Note	%±
1870	738		—
1880	17,143		2,222.9%
1890	21,614		26.1%
1900	21,421		−0.9%
1910	21,521		0.5%
1920	21,845		1.5%
1930	23,588		8.0%
1940	24,152		2.4%
1950	23,670		−2.0%
1960	24,285		2.6%
1970	24,778		2.0%
1980	26,855		8.4%
1990	27,268		1.5%
2000	29,554		8.4%
2010	29,180		−1.3%
2020	30,223		3.6%
2025 (est.)	30,064	▼	−0.5%
U.S. Decennial Census; 1790-1960 1900-1990; 1990-2000 2010-2020

The McPherson Micropolitan Statistical Area includes all of McPherson County.

=== Racial and ethnic composition ===
McPherson County, Kansas – Racial and ethnic composition Note: the US Census treats Hispanic/Latino as an ethnic category. This table excludes Latinos from the racial categories and assigns them to a separate category. Hispanics/Latinos may be of any race.
Race / Ethnicity (NH = Non-Hispanic)	Pop 1980	Pop 1990	Pop 2000	Pop 2010	Pop 2020	% 1980	% 1990	% 2000	% 2010	% 2020
White alone (NH)	26,211	26,504	28,240	27,176	26,519	97.60%	97.20%	95.55%	93.13%	87.74%
Black or African American alone (NH)	180	203	232	279	475	0.67%	0.74%	0.79%	0.96%	1.57%
Native American or Alaska Native alone (NH)	69	101	92	91	93	0.26%	0.37%	0.31%	0.31%	0.31%
Asian alone (NH)	111	122	95	144	213	0.41%	0.45%	0.32%	0.49%	0.70%
Native Hawaiian or Pacific Islander alone (NH)	x	x	15	19	8	x	x	0.05%	0.07%	0.03%
Other race alone (NH)	34	13	12	17	140	0.13%	0.05%	0.04%	0.06%	0.46%
Mixed race or Multiracial (NH)	x	x	295	429	1,183	x	x	1.00%	1.47%	3.91%
Hispanic or Latino (any race)	250	325	573	1,025	1,592	0.93%	1.19%	1.94%	3.51%	5.27%
Total	26,855	27,268	29,554	29,180	30,223	100.00%	100.00%	100.00%	100.00%	100.00%

=== 2020 census ===
As of the 2020 census, the county had a population of 30,223. The median age was 40.0 years. 22.0% of residents were under the age of 18 and 21.0% of residents were 65 years of age or older. For every 100 females there were 99.8 males, and for every 100 females age 18 and over there were 97.7 males age 18 and over. 46.5% of residents lived in urban areas, while 53.5% lived in rural areas.

The racial makeup of the county was 89.2% White, 1.6% Black or African American, 0.5% American Indian and Alaska Native, 0.7% Asian, 0.0% Native Hawaiian and Pacific Islander, 2.2% from some other race, and 5.7% from two or more races. Hispanic or Latino residents of any race comprised 5.3% of the population.

There were 11,897 households in the county, of which 28.0% had children under the age of 18 living with them and 22.9% had a female householder with no spouse or partner present. About 29.4% of all households were made up of individuals and 13.6% had someone living alone who was 65 years of age or older.

There were 13,019 housing units, of which 8.6% were vacant. Among occupied housing units, 72.4% were owner-occupied and 27.6% were renter-occupied. The homeowner vacancy rate was 1.9% and the rental vacancy rate was 10.8%.

=== 2000 census ===
As of the census of 2000, there were 29,554 people, 11,205 households, and 7,966 families residing in the county. The population density was 33 people per square mile (13 people/km^{2}). There were 11,830 housing units at an average density of 13 per square mile (5.0/km^{2}). The racial makeup of the county was 96.53% White, 0.81% Black or African American, 0.34% Native American, 0.32% Asian, 0.06% Pacific Islander, 0.79% from other races, and 1.16% from two or more races. 1.94% of the population were Hispanic or Latino of any race. 37.1% were of German, 12.9% Swedish, 12.1% American, 6.7% English and 6.3% Irish ancestry according to Census 2000.

There were 11,205 households, out of which 33.00% had children under the age of 18 living with them, 62.50% were married couples living together, 6.00% had a female householder with no husband present, and 28.90% were non-families. 25.50% of all households were made up of individuals, and 11.80% had someone living alone who was 65 years of age or older. The average household size was 2.49 and the average family size was 2.99.

In the county, the population was spread out, with 25.40% under the age of 18, 10.30% from 18 to 24, 25.20% from 25 to 44, 21.80% from 45 to 64, and 17.30% who were 65 years of age or older. The median age was 38 years. For every 100 females there were 95.90 males. For every 100 females age 18 and over, there were 92.90 males.

The median income for a household in the county was $41,138, and the median income for a family was $48,243. Males had a median income of $33,530 versus $21,175 for females. The per capita income for the county was $18,921. About 4.20% of families and 6.60% of the population were below the poverty line, including 5.20% of those under age 18 and 8.10% of those age 65 or over.

== Government ==
=== Presidential elections ===
McPherson County has been predominantly carried by Republican candidates, particularly from 1940. The last time a Democratic candidate carried this county was in 1964 (Lyndon B. Johnson).

Presidential election results

United States presidential election results for McPherson County, Kansas
Year	Republican		Democratic		Third party(ies)	
Year	No.	%	No.	%	No.	%
1888	2,279	51.70%	829	18.81%	1,300	29.49%
1892	2,294	48.42%	0	0.00%	2,444	51.58%
1896	2,269	48.93%	2,324	50.12%	44	0.95%
1900	2,640	54.61%	2,121	43.88%	73	1.51%
1904	2,991	72.72%	773	18.79%	349	8.49%
1908	2,708	57.39%	1,905	40.37%	106	2.25%
1912	455	9.79%	1,639	35.27%	2,553	54.94%
1916	3,806	47.61%	3,737	46.75%	451	5.64%
1920	4,870	69.50%	1,926	27.49%	211	3.01%
1924	5,128	65.99%	1,530	19.69%	1,113	14.32%
1928	6,230	79.98%	1,457	18.71%	102	1.31%
1932	4,098	43.70%	5,003	53.35%	276	2.94%
1936	4,744	42.95%	6,256	56.64%	46	0.42%
1940	6,732	60.24%	4,240	37.94%	204	1.83%
1944	5,840	62.31%	3,321	35.44%	211	2.25%
1948	5,952	57.54%	3,879	37.50%	513	4.96%
1952	8,053	74.58%	2,371	21.96%	374	3.46%
1956	7,521	73.75%	2,603	25.52%	74	0.73%
1960	7,920	73.61%	2,774	25.78%	65	0.60%
1964	4,483	45.62%	5,173	52.65%	170	1.73%
1968	6,420	64.98%	2,893	29.28%	567	5.74%
1972	7,457	70.56%	2,858	27.04%	254	2.40%
1976	3,519	57.31%	2,483	40.44%	138	2.25%
1980	6,843	58.83%	3,340	28.72%	1,448	12.45%
1984	8,630	71.89%	3,185	26.53%	189	1.57%
1988	6,563	58.79%	4,354	39.00%	247	2.21%
1992	5,745	44.22%	3,645	28.06%	3,601	27.72%
1996	8,142	63.20%	3,536	27.45%	1,205	9.35%
2000	8,501	68.22%	3,272	26.26%	688	5.52%
2004	9,595	71.78%	3,589	26.85%	183	1.37%
2008	8,937	66.76%	4,218	31.51%	231	1.73%
2012	8,545	69.49%	3,449	28.05%	303	2.46%
2016	8,549	67.09%	3,226	25.32%	967	7.59%
2020	9,964	69.01%	4,134	28.63%	340	2.35%
2024	9,816	69.60%	4,021	28.51%	267	1.89%

=== Laws ===
Following amendment to the Kansas Constitution in 1986, the county remained a prohibition, or "dry", county until 1996, when voters approved the sale of alcoholic liquor by the individual drink with a 30 percent food sales requirement.

== Education ==
=== Colleges ===
- McPherson College in McPherson
- Bethany College in Lindsborg
- Central Christian College in McPherson

=== Unified school districts ===
School districts include:

- Smoky Valley USD 400
- McPherson USD 418
- Canton-Galva USD 419
- Moundridge USD 423
- Inman USD 448

School district office in neighboring county

- Goessel USD 411
- Hesston USD 460
- Little River-Windom USD 444
- Southeast of Saline USD 306

== Museums ==
- Birger Sandzén Memorial Gallery in Lindsborg
- McCormick-Deering Days Museum in Inman
- McPherson Museum in McPherson
- Lindsborg Old Mill & Swedish Heritage Museum in Lindsborg
- Kansas Motorcycle Museum in Marquette

== Communities ==
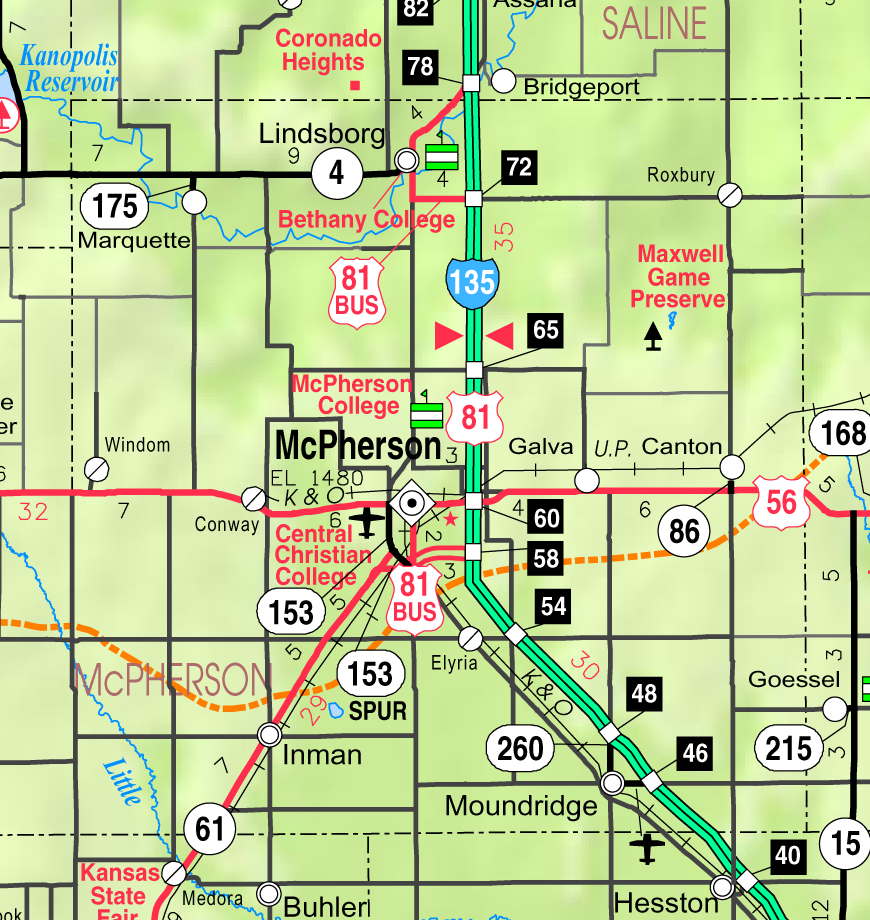
2005 map of McPherson County (map legend)

List of townships / incorporated cities / unincorporated communities / extinct former communities within McPherson County.

=== Cities ===
- Canton
- Galva
- Inman
- Lindsborg
- Marquette
- McPherson (county seat)
- Moundridge
- Windom

=== Unincorporated communities ===
† means a community is designated a Census-Designated Place (CDP) by the United States Census Bureau.

- Conway
- Elyria†
- Groveland
- Johnstown
- New Gottland
- Roxbury†

=== Ghost towns ===
- Alta Mills
- Battle Hill
- Christian
- Doles Park
- Elivon
- Fremount
- King City
- Sweadal

=== Townships ===
McPherson County is divided into twenty-five townships. The cities of Lindsborg and McPherson are considered governmentally independent and are excluded from the census figures for the townships. In the following table, the population center is the largest city (or cities) included in that township's population total, if it is of a significant size.

Sources: 2000 U.S. Gazetteer from the U.S. Census Bureau.
Township	FIPS	Population center	Population	Population density /km^{2} (/sq mi)	Land area km^{2} (sq mi)	Water area km^{2} (sq mi)	Water %	Geographic coordinates
Battle Hill	04550		91	1 (3)	93 (36)	0 (0)	0.33%	38°29′2″N 97°25′22″W
Bonaville	07925		66	1 (2)	93 (36)	0 (0)	0.34%	38°32′57″N 97°30′34″W
Canton	10500		1,090	12 (30)	93 (36)	0 (0)	0.02%	38°23′21″N 97°25′36″W
Castle	10950		225	2 (6)	93 (36)	0 (0)	0.12%	38°23′9″N 97°52′44″W
Delmore	17575		138	1 (4)	93 (36)	0 (0)	0.15%	38°28′43″N 97°33′17″W
Empire	21200		1,178	13 (33)	94 (36)	0 (0)	0%	38°23′12″N 97°32′7″W
Groveland	29150		234	2 (6)	94 (36)	0 (0)	0.12%	38°17′55″N 97°44′37″W
Gypsum Creek	29325		215	2 (6)	93 (36)	0 (0)	0.11%	38°33′32″N 97°26′12″W
Harper	30225		137	1 (4)	93 (36)	0 (0)	0.17%	38°28′55″N 97°45′50″W
Hayes	30950		287	3 (8)	94 (36)	0 (0)	0%	38°17′55″N 97°52′54″W
Jackson	34850		198	2 (6)	93 (36)	0 (0)	0.49%	38°22′33″N 97°46′48″W
King City	36900		544	6 (15)	93 (36)	0 (0)	0.13%	38°18′51″N 97°39′8″W
Little Valley	41600		475	5 (13)	93 (36)	0 (0)	0.02%	38°13′38″N 97°52′32″W
Lone Tree	42525		486	5 (13)	94 (36)	0 (0)	0%	38°17′37″N 97°32′48″W
McPherson	43975		618	8 (21)	77 (30)	0 (0)	0.23%	38°23′24″N 97°38′57″W
Marquette	44950		776	8 (22)	93 (36)	0 (0)	0.16%	38°33′9″N 97°51′30″W
Meridian	45975		341	4 (9)	94 (36)	0 (0)	0%	38°12′43″N 97°26′8″W
Mound	48675		2,104	23 (59)	93 (36)	0 (0)	0.17%	38°12′24″N 97°31′22″W
New Gottland	50350		354	4 (10)	93 (36)	0 (0)	0.38%	38°28′29″N 97°38′21″W
Smoky Hill	66025		297	3 (9)	89 (34)	0 (0)	0.05%	38°34′35″N 97°38′59″W
South Sharps Creek	67000		112	1 (3)	93 (36)	0 (0)	0.18%	38°28′21″N 97°52′11″W
Spring Valley	67750		373	4 (10)	94 (36)	0 (0)	0.03%	38°18′2″N 97°25′21″W
Superior	69475		1,640	18 (46)	92 (36)	1 (0)	0.72%	38°13′28″N 97°46′1″W
Turkey Creek	71700		294	3 (8)	93 (36)	0 (0)	0%	38°13′10″N 97°38′23″W
Union	72225		190	2 (5)	93 (36)	0 (0)	0.20%	38°33′12″N 97°44′59″W

== See also ==
- List of people from McPherson County, Kansas
- National Register of Historic Places listings in McPherson County, Kansas
- McPherson Valley Wetlands
- Maxwell Wildlife Refuge

Community information for Kansas

- Kansas locations by per capita income
- List of counties in Kansas
- List of townships in Kansas
- List of cities in Kansas
- List of unincorporated communities in Kansas
- List of ghost towns in Kansas
