= McPherson Museum =

Local history museum in McPherson, Kansas

Coordinates: 38.370°N 97.6503°W

- Established: 1968
- Location: McPherson, Kansas
- President: Gary Casebeer
- Website: www.mcphersonmuseum.com

The McPherson Museum of McPherson, Kansas, is a local history museum that preserves the historical and cultural heritage of the McPherson community.

== The museum ==
In 1968, McPherson College and the city of McPherson formed a public-private partnership for the purposes of establishing a museum, and collections held by the college and the city were moved into the Vaniman home located at 1130 East Euclid. In 1985, the McPherson Museum and Arts Foundation was established to operate the museum. A new facility was built in 2013 and the museum moved all of its collections to the current location, at 1111 East Kansas Avenue.

=== Collections ===
The origins of the McPherson Museum collections dates back to 1890 when the faculty and students of McPherson College began building a collection of geology and paleontology specimens. These collections were held and displayed at various locations on the college campus.

In 1967, the Jacob Strausz family of Moundridge, Kansas, donated their collection of over four-hundred pioneer artifacts to the city of McPherson with the stipulation that a museum be established to exhibit the collection. In 1968, the city of McPherson and McPherson College merged their two collections to create a museum for the benefit of the entire McPherson community.

The collections have been enhanced since 1968, and today the collections of the McPherson Museum consist of approximately 25,000 items and include such areas as geology, paleontology, pioneer history, fine art, Native American history, and local history.
