= Liberty Township, Saline County, Kansas =

Township in Saline County, Kansas, U.S.

Liberty Township
- Township
- Location within Saline County
- Coordinates: 38.6586°N 97.5353°W
- Country: United States
- State: Kansas
- County: Saline
- Established: 1872

Government
  - District 3 County Commissioner: Rodger Sparks (R)

Area
  - Total: 36.009 sq mi (93.26 km^{2})
  - Land: 35.945 sq mi (93.10 km^{2})
  - Water: 0.064 sq mi (0.17 km^{2}) 0.18%

Population (2020)
  - Total: 163
  - Density: 4.53/sq mi (1.75/km^{2})
- Time zone: UTC-6 (CST)
  - Summer (DST): UTC-5 (CDT)
- Area code: 785
- GNIS feature ID: 476956

Liberty Township is a township in Saline County, Kansas, United States. As of the 2020 census, its population was 163.

== History ==
Liberty Township was organized in 1872 from Walnut Township.

== Geography ==
Liberty Township covers an area of 36.009 square miles (93.26 square kilometers). The Smoky Hill River flows through it, as well as Pewee Creek.

=== Adjacent townships ===
Walnut Township, Saline County
		north	northeast	Eureka Township, Saline County
Smoky View Township, Saline County	west	self	east	Gypsum Township, Saline County
Smoky Hill Township, McPherson County	southwest	south	southeast	Gypsum Creek Township, McPherson County
Bonaville Township, McPherson County
