= Moundridge USD 423 =

Public school district in Moundridge, Kansas

Address
- 526 E. Cole St. Moundridge, Kansas, 67107; United States
- Coordinates: 38°12′8″N 97°30′42″W

District information
- Type: Public
- Grades: K to 12
- Schools: 2

Other information
- Website: usd423.org

Moundridge USD 423 is a public unified school district headquartered in Moundridge, Kansas, United States. The district includes the communities of Moundridge, Elyria, and nearby rural areas.

== Schools ==
The school district operates the following schools:

- Moundridge High School / Middle School
- Moundridge Elementary School

== See also ==
- List of high schools in Kansas
- List of unified school districts in Kansas
- Kansas State Department of Education
- Kansas State High School Activities Association
