= New Gottland, Kansas =

Unincorporated community in McPherson County, Kansas

Coordinates: 38°26′59″N 97°36′41″W

New Gottland is an unincorporated community in McPherson County, Kansas, United States.

== History ==
A post office was opened in New Gottland in 1872, and remained in operation until it was discontinued in 1883.

== Education ==
The community is served by McPherson USD 418 public school district.
