= Johnstown, Kansas =

Unincorporated community in McPherson County, Kansas

Coordinates: 38°29′34″N 97°40′32″W

Johnstown is a ghost town in McPherson County, Kansas, United States.

== History ==
Johnstown had a post office from the 1880s until 1904.

== Education ==
The community is served by Smoky Valley USD 400 public school district.

== Transportation ==
The Union Pacific Railroad formerly provided passenger rail service along a route from Salina to McPherson. Johnstown saw multiple daily passenger trains until at least 1929 with mixed train service until at least 1959. As of 2025, the nearest passenger rail station is located in Newton, where Amtrak's Southwest Chief stops once daily on a route from Chicago to Los Angeles.
