= McPherson USD 418 =

Public school district in McPherson, Kansas

Address
- 514 N. Main St. McPherson, Kansas, 67460; United States
- Coordinates: 38.3742°N 97.6664°W

District information
- Type: Public
- Grades: K to 12
- Schools: 6

Other information
- Website: mcpherson.com

McPherson USD 418 is a public unified school district headquartered in McPherson, Kansas, United States. The district includes the communities of McPherson, Conway, New Gottland, and nearby rural areas. A portion of the Elyria census-designated place is in this district.

== Schools ==
The school district operates the following schools:

- McPherson High School
- McPherson Middle School
  - The school building opened in 1938. Its exterior is made of bricks and is red. In 2026, it had 480 students. That year, Inge Esping, the principal, stated in regards to the decor, "We already have a little bit of an old-school vibe for sure".
- Eisenhower Elementary
- Lincoln Elementary
- Roosevelt Elementary
- Washington Elementary

== See also ==
- List of high schools in Kansas
- List of unified school districts in Kansas
- Kansas State Department of Education
- Kansas State High School Activities Association
