= Moundridge, Kansas =

City in McPherson County, Kansas

- City
- Location within McPherson County and Kansas

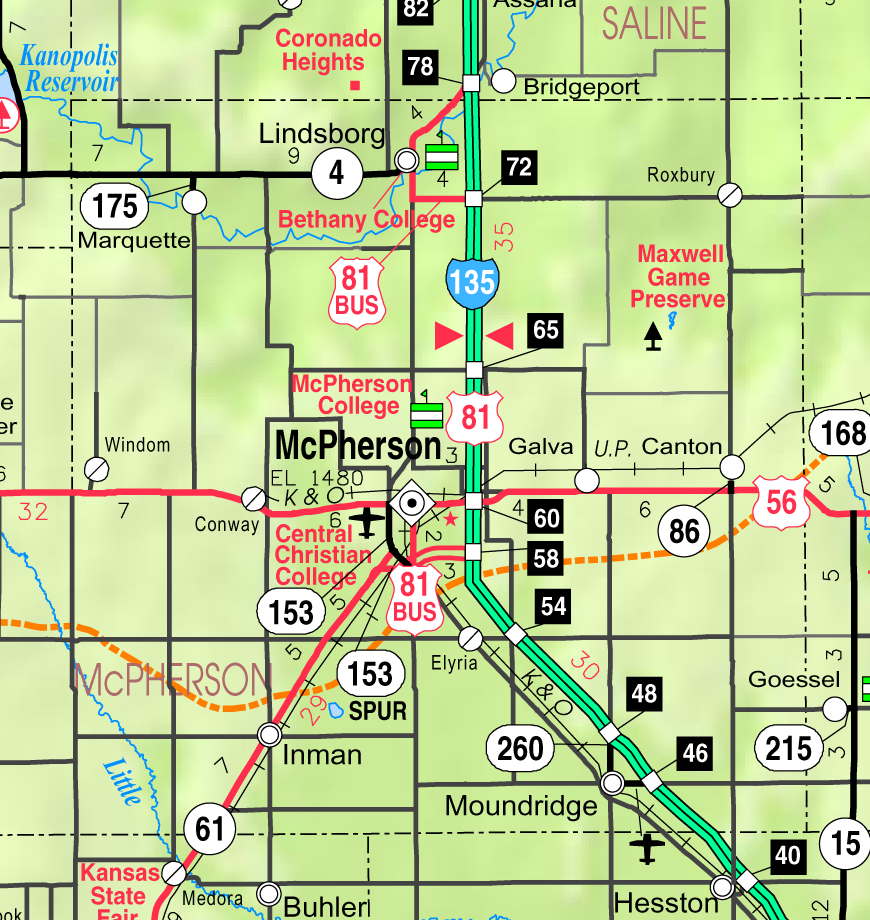
- KDOT map of McPherson County (legend)
- Coordinates: 38°12′07″N 97°30′54″W
- Country: United States
- State: Kansas
- County: McPherson
- Township: Mound
- Founded: 1876 (Christian)
- Incorporated: 1887 (Moundridge)

Area
  - Total: 1.61 sq mi (4.17 km^{2})
  - Land: 1.57 sq mi (4.06 km^{2})
  - Water: 0.042 sq mi (0.11 km^{2})
- Elevation: 1,467 ft (447 m)

Population (2020)
  - Total: 1,974
  - Density: 1,260/sq mi (486/km^{2})
- Time zone: UTC-6 (CST)
  - Summer (DST): UTC-5 (CDT)
- ZIP Code: 67107
- Area code: 620
- FIPS code: 20-48800
- GNIS ID: 2395116
- Website: moundridge.com

Moundridge is a city in McPherson County, Kansas, United States. As of the 2020 census, the population of the city was 1,974. Manufacturing facilities for Grasshopper (lawn mowers) and Bradbury Group (roll forming equipment) are located in Moundridge.

== History ==
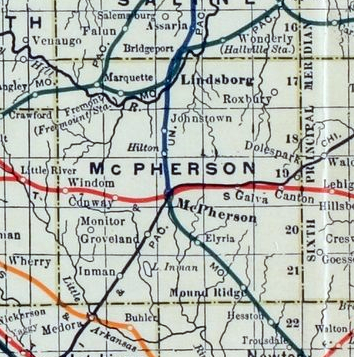
1915 railroad map of McPherson County

=== Early history ===
For millennia, the Great Plains of North America were inhabited by nomadic Native Americans. From the 16th to the 18th century, the Kingdom of France claimed ownership of large parts of North America. In 1762, after the French and Indian War, France secretly ceded New France to Spain, under the terms of the Treaty of Fontainebleau.

=== 19th century ===
In 1802, Spain returned most of the land to France, keeping title to about 7,500 square miles. In 1803, most of the land that comprises modern day Kansas was acquired by the United States from France as part of the 828,000 square mile Louisiana Purchase.

In 1854, the Kansas Territory was organized under the provisions of the Kansas–Nebraska Act, then in 1861 Kansas became the 34th US state. In 1867, McPherson County was established, which included the land for modern day Moundridge.

In 1876, the community was founded with the name Christian. In 1887, it was renamed and incorporated as Moundridge on account of the elevation of the town site.

Between 1874 and 1880, of the approximately 45,000 Mennonites who had been living in South Russia, 10,000 departed for the United States and 8,000 for Manitoba. Available cropland in the central United States was similar to that in their homelands in the Crimean Peninsula. Since the central part of the state was settled, Kansas has enjoyed the reputation as the top wheat-producing state. Settlers in central Kansas, experienced in Russian methods of dryland farming and flour milling, introduced winter wheat in 1873 and quickly saw their industry become dominant. The museums in nearby Hillsboro and Goessel demonstrate the lives and times of these early settlers.

Almost all of the original settlers of McPherson County spoke German, many exclusively. With the coming of the automobile and the importance of commercial participation with the English-speaking citizens, the use of German diminished in importance. The participation of the United States in World Wars I and II dramatically increased the use of English and by the early 1940s, ministers rarely preached in German. As of the year 2000, a very small number of German religious publications are available, primarily for use by elderly congregants.

== Geography ==
According to the United States Census Bureau, the city has a total area of 1.41 square miles (3.65 km^{2}), all land.

== Demographics ==
Historical population
Census	Pop.	Note	%±
1890	443		—
1900	557		25.7%
1910	626		12.4%
1920	733		17.1%
1930	870		18.7%
1940	864		−0.7%
1950	942		9.0%
1960	1,214		28.9%
1970	1,271		4.7%
1980	1,453		14.3%
1990	1,531		5.4%
2000	1,593		4.0%
2010	1,737		9.0%
2020	1,974		13.6%
U.S. Decennial Census

=== 2020 census ===
As of the 2020 census, Moundridge had a population of 1,974 and 475 families. The population density was 1,258.1 per square mile (485.8/km^{2}), and there were 901 housing units at an average density of 574.3 per square mile (221.7/km^{2}).

The median age was 47.3 years. 19.0% of residents were under the age of 18, 7.4% were from 18 to 24, 20.6% were from 25 to 44, 21.9% were from 45 to 64, and 31.0% were 65 years of age or older. For every 100 females, there were 89.4 males, and for every 100 females age 18 and over, there were 83.3 males age 18 and over.

0.0% of residents lived in urban areas, while 100.0% lived in rural areas.

Of the 820 households, 21.2% had children under the age of 18 living in them. 47.4% were married-couple households, 18.2% were households with a male householder and no spouse or partner present, and 29.8% were households with a female householder and no spouse or partner present. 37.4% of households were made up of individuals, and 20.3% had someone living alone who was 65 years of age or older.

Of housing units, 9.0% were vacant. The homeowner vacancy rate was 2.1% and the rental vacancy rate was 7.9%.

Racial composition as of the 2020 census
Race	Number	Percent
White	1,824	92.4%
Black or African American	19	1.0%
American Indian and Alaska Native	4	0.2%
Asian	7	0.4%
Native Hawaiian and Other Pacific Islander	1	0.1%
Some other race	26	1.3%
Two or more races	93	4.7%
Hispanic or Latino (of any race)	99	5.0%

=== Education ===
The percent of those with a bachelor's degree or higher was estimated to be 18.6% of the population.

=== Households and housing ===
The average household size was 2.0 and the average family size was 2.8.

=== Income and poverty ===
The 2016–2020 5-year American Community Survey estimates show that the median household income was $43,750 (with a margin of error of +/- $9,528) and the median family income was $59,167 (+/- $11,285). Males had a median income of $46,782 (+/- $2,262) versus $26,818 (+/- $8,192) for females. The median income for those above 16 years old was $39,069 (+/- $3,358). Approximately, 0.0% of families and 4.5% of the population were below the poverty line, including 0.0% of those under the age of 18 and 13.8% of those ages 65 or over.

=== 2010 census ===
As of the census of 2010, there were 1,737 people, 736 households, and 461 families residing in the city. The population density was 1,231.9 inhabitants per square mile (475.6/km^{2}). There were 803 housing units at an average density of 569.5 per square mile (219.9/km^{2}). The racial makeup of the city was 96.9% White, 0.3% African American, 0.4% Native American, 0.1% Asian, 0.9% from other races, and 1.3% from two or more races. Hispanic or Latino of any race comprised 3.4% of the population.

There were 736 households, of which 25.7% had children under the age of 18 living with them, 49.7% were married couples living together, 8.8% had a female householder with no husband present, 4.1% had a male householder with no wife present, and 37.4% were non-families; 33.6% of all households were made up of individuals, and 19.4% had someone living alone who was 65 years of age or older. The average household size was 2.25 and the average family size was 2.85.

The median age in the city was 46.6 years., with 21.6% of residents under the age of 18; 6% were between the ages of 18 and 24; 20% were from 25 to 44; 24.9% were from 45 to 64; and 27.6% were 65 years of age or older. The gender makeup of the city was 46.1% male and 53.9% female.

== Economy ==
The Grasshopper Company manufactures mowers and lawn mower implements. It was founded in 1969 and headquartered in Moundridge. The parent company is Moridge Manufacturing (founded in 1958).

The Bradbury Group is headquartered in Moundridge. Founded as Rollformed Products in 1959, by co-founder Floyd Bradbury. The company is a major producer of rollforming equipment with 10 locations and many brands under their umbrella.

== Education ==
The community is served by Moundridge USD 423 public school district. Moundridge High School / Middle School and Moundridge Elementary School are located within the city.

== Infrastructure ==
=== Transportation ===
Interstate I-135 runs along the north-east side of the city. Highway US 81 passes through city.

Moundridge has a paved 3,400 foot 17-35 runway airport (K47K) elevation 1,489 ft., Moundridge Municipal Airfield, which is located approximately one mile (1.6 km) east of central Moundridge.

The Missouri Pacific Railroad formerly provided passenger rail service along a route from Eldorado to McPherson although this had ended prior to 1946. As of 2025, the nearest passenger rail station is located in Newton, where Amtrak's Southwest Chief stops once daily on a route from Chicago to Los Angeles.

== Notable people ==
- Laurie Koehn, professional basketball player
