= Holland Township, Kansas =

Holland Township
- Township
- Location in Dickinson County
- Coordinates: 38°39′10″N 097°18′56″W
- Country: United States
- State: Kansas
- County: Dickinson

Area
  - Total: 36.12 sq mi (93.56 km^{2})
  - Land: 36.1 sq mi (93.4 km^{2})
  - Water: 0.058 sq mi (0.15 km^{2}) 0.16%
- Elevation: 1,375 ft (419 m)

Population (2020)
  - Total: 103
  - Density: 2.86/sq mi (1.10/km^{2})
- GNIS feature ID: 0476966

Holland Township is a township in Dickinson County, Kansas, United States. As of the 2020 census, its population was 103.

== History ==
Holland Township was organized in 1873.

== Geography ==
Holland Township covers an area of 36.12 square miles (93.6 km^{2}) and contains one incorporated settlement, Carlton. According to the USGS, it contains one cemetery, Woodlawn.
