= Moore Township, Marion County, Kansas =

Moore Township Marion County, Kansas
- Township
- Location within Marion County

- Location within the state of Kansas
- Coordinates: 38.4785912°N 97.3165135°W
- Country: United States
- State: Kansas
- County: Marion

Area
  - Total: 36 sq mi (93 km^{2})

Dimensions
  - Length: 6.0 mi (9.7 km)
  - Width: 6.0 mi (9.7 km)
- Elevation: 1,453 ft (443 m)

Population (2020)
  - Total: 82
  - Density: 2.3/sq mi (0.88/km^{2})
- Time zone: UTC-6 (CST)
  - Summer (DST): UTC-5 (CDT)
- Area code: 620
- FIPS code: 20-48100
- GNIS ID: 477108
- Website: County website

Moore Township is a township in Marion County, Kansas, United States. As of the 2020 census, the township population was 82.

== Geography ==
Moore Township covers an area of 36 square miles (93.2 km^{2}).

== Cities and towns ==
The township contains the following settlements:

- No cities or unincorporated communities.

== Cemeteries ==
The township contains the following cemeteries:

- Durham Baptist Church Cemetery, located in Section 3 T18S R1E.
- Pankratz Cemetery, located in Section 3 T18S R1E.
