= Logan Township, Marion County, Kansas =

Logan Township Marion County, Kansas
- Township
- Location within Marion County

- Location within the state of Kansas
- Coordinates: 38.5657129°N 97.3163704°W
- Country: United States
- State: Kansas
- County: Marion

Area
  - Total: 36 sq mi (93 km^{2})

Dimensions
  - Length: 6.0 mi (9.7 km)
  - Width: 6.0 mi (9.7 km)
- Elevation: 1,499 ft (457 m)

Population (2020)
  - Total: 114
  - Density: 3.2/sq mi (1.2/km^{2})
- Time zone: UTC-6 (CST)
  - Summer (DST): UTC-5 (CDT)
- Area code: 620
- FIPS code: 20-41950
- GNIS ID: 477105
- Website: County website

Logan Township is a township in Marion County, Kansas, United States. As of the 2020 census, the township population was 114.

== Geography ==
Logan Township covers an area of 36 square miles (93.2 km^{2}).

== Communities ==
The township contains the following settlements:

- No cities or unincorporated communities.

== Cemeteries ==
The township contains the following cemeteries:

- Beltz Cemetery (a.k.a. "Early" Mennonite Brethren Church Cemetery), located in Section 34 T17S R1E.
- Elm Springs Bible Hall Cemetery, located in Section 17 T17S R1E.
- Friedesthal Cemetery (a.k.a. Central Heights Cemetery) (a.k.a. Peace Valley Cemetery), located in Section 21 T17S R1E.
- Kaiser Cemetery (a.k.a. "Early" Congregational Church Cemetery), located in Section 36 T17S R1E.
- Logan Cemetery (a.k.a. Morning Star Cemetery), located in Section 13 T17S R1E.
