= Interstate 135 =

Highway in Kansas

Interstate 135
- Map of Kansas with I-135 highlighted in red

Route information
- Auxiliary route of I-35
- Maintained by KDOT
- Length: 95.738 mi (154.075 km)
- Existed: September 13, 1976–present
- NHS: Entire route

Major junctions
- South end: I-35 / Kansas Turnpike in Wichita
- US-81 in Wichita; I-235 in Wichita; K-15 in Wichita; US-54 / US-400 in Wichita; I-235 / K-96 / K-254 in Wichita; US-50 / K-15 in Newton; K-61 / US 81 Bus. by McPherson; US-56 / US 81 Bus. in McPherson; K-4 near Lindsborg
- North end: I-70 / US-40 / US-81 in Salina

Location
- Country: United States
- State: Kansas
- Counties: Sedgwick, Harvey, McPherson, Saline

Highway system
- Interstate Highway System; Main; Auxiliary; Suffixed; Business; Future; Kansas State Highway System; Interstate; US; State; Spurs
← K-134	→ K-136

Interstate 135 (I-135) is an approximately 95.7-mile-long (154.0 km) auxiliary Interstate Highway in central and south-central Kansas, United States. I-135, which is signed as north–south, runs between I-35 and the Kansas Turnpike in Wichita north to I-70, U.S. Highway 40 (US-40), and US-81 in Salina. Except for the first 0.46 miles (0.74 km), I-135 overlaps US-81 for almost its entire length. The route also runs through the cities of McPherson, Newton, and Park City.

The highway was designated as Interstate 35W (I-35W) until September 1976, when it was renumbered as I-135 to conform to new AASHTO policies that eliminated most suffixed Interstate Highways. It is currently the longest three-digit spur with an odd first digit in the Interstate System.

== Route description ==
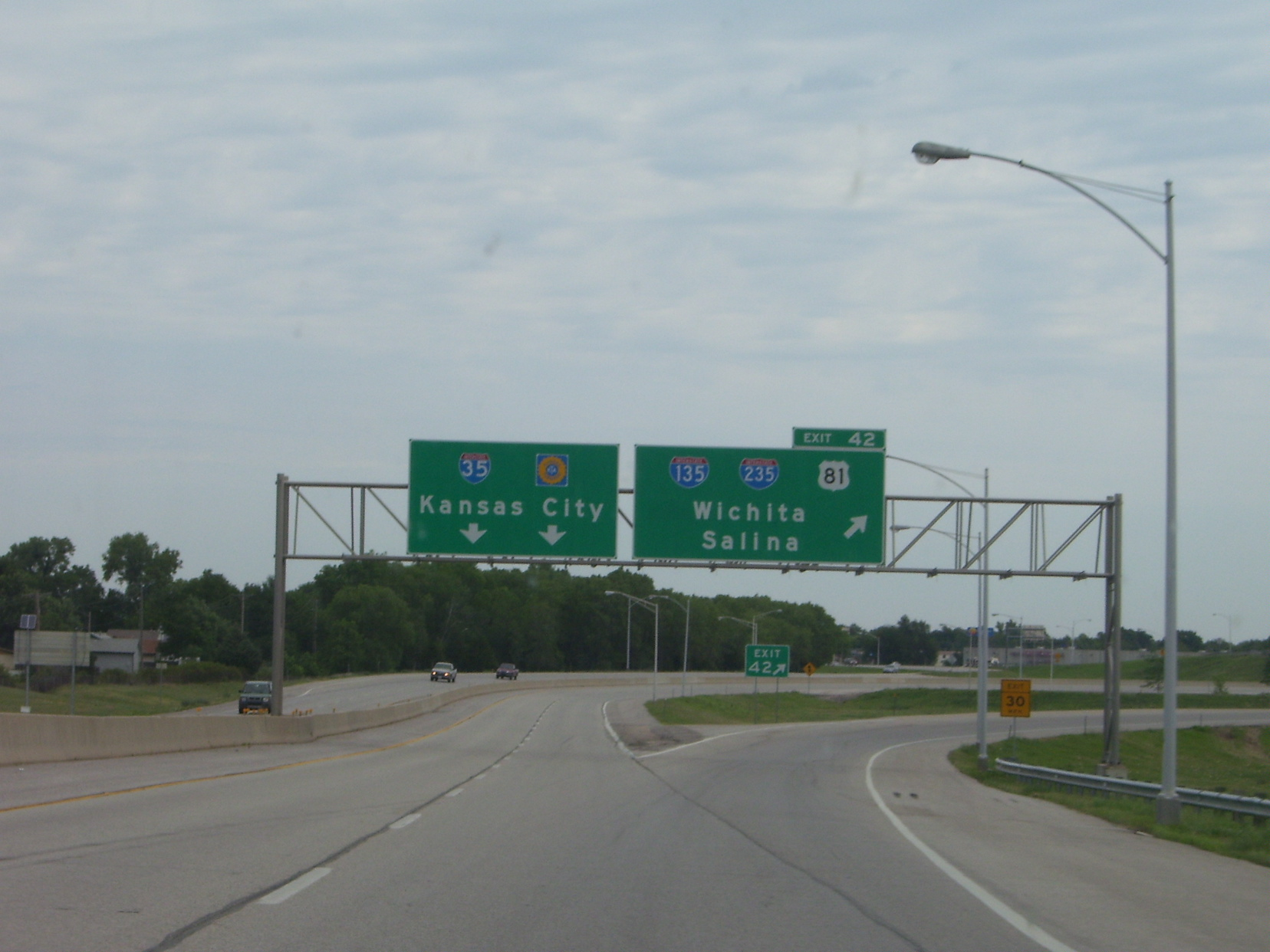
I-135 begins at this exit from the Kansas Turnpike.

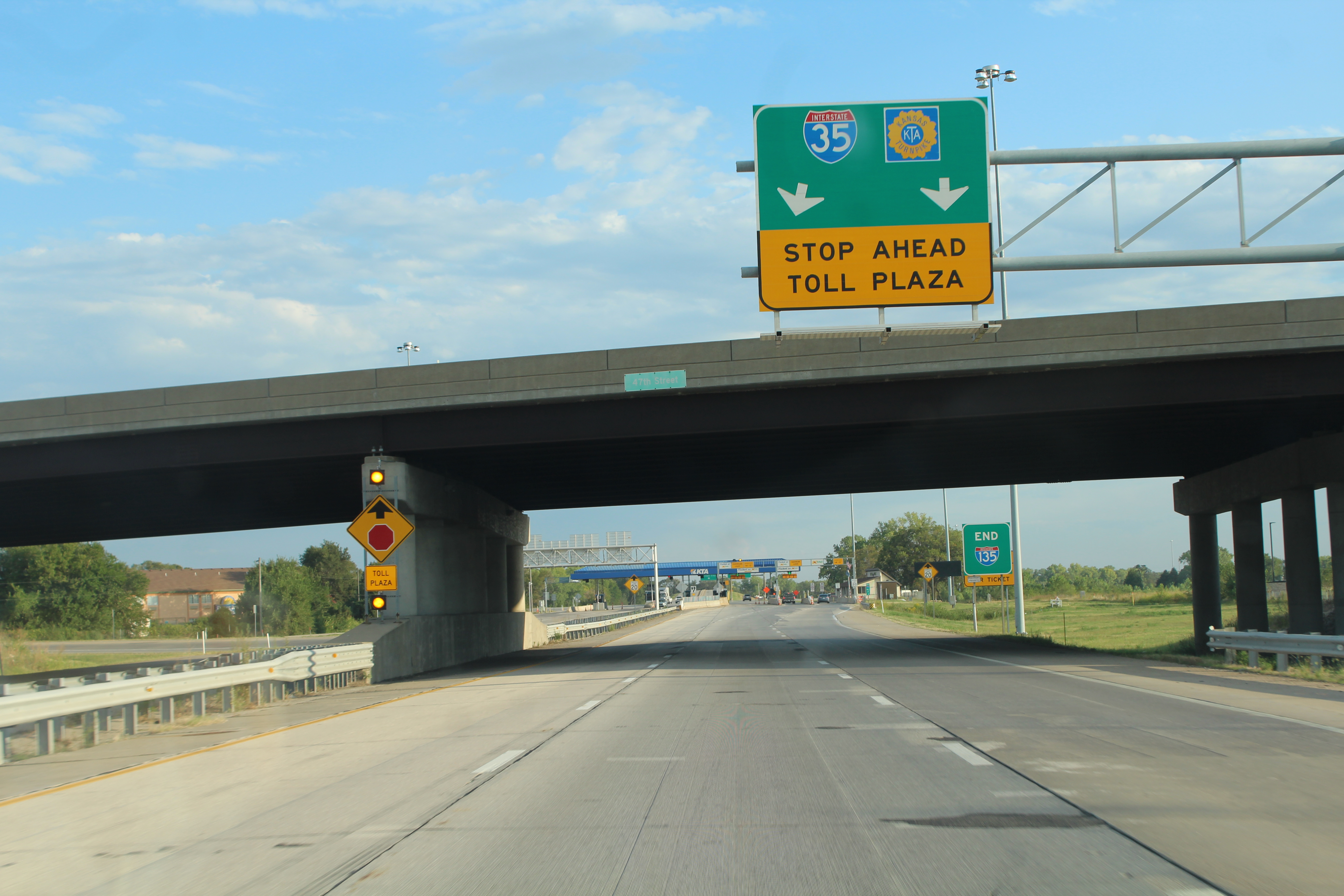
the southern end of I-135 from I-135

I-135 begins from the south at exit 42 on the Kansas Turnpike. The exit is signed as I-135/I-235/US-81 for Wichita and Salina. US-81 joins I-135 0.5 miles (0.80 km) later at exit 1A (East 47th Street South) and remains concurrent with it for the rest of its length. Less than one mile (1.6 km) from the Kansas Turnpike tollbooth, I-235, a loop around the westside of Wichita, branches off the highway at exit 1C. I-135 continues northward from there, running just east of the Wichita downtown area. It reunites with I-235 at exits 11A and 11B at milepost 11 at the loop's other end.

I-135 leaves Wichita and continues northward to Newton where it turns northwest around milemarker 33. The freeway continues in this direction for 20 miles (32 km), returning to a due north course at McPherson.

The stretch of I-135 in Saline County from the Saline–McPherson county line to the highway's terminus at I-70, is designated as the Ben E. Vidricksen Highway, in honor of a state senator who was active in pushing for the highway's enlargement.

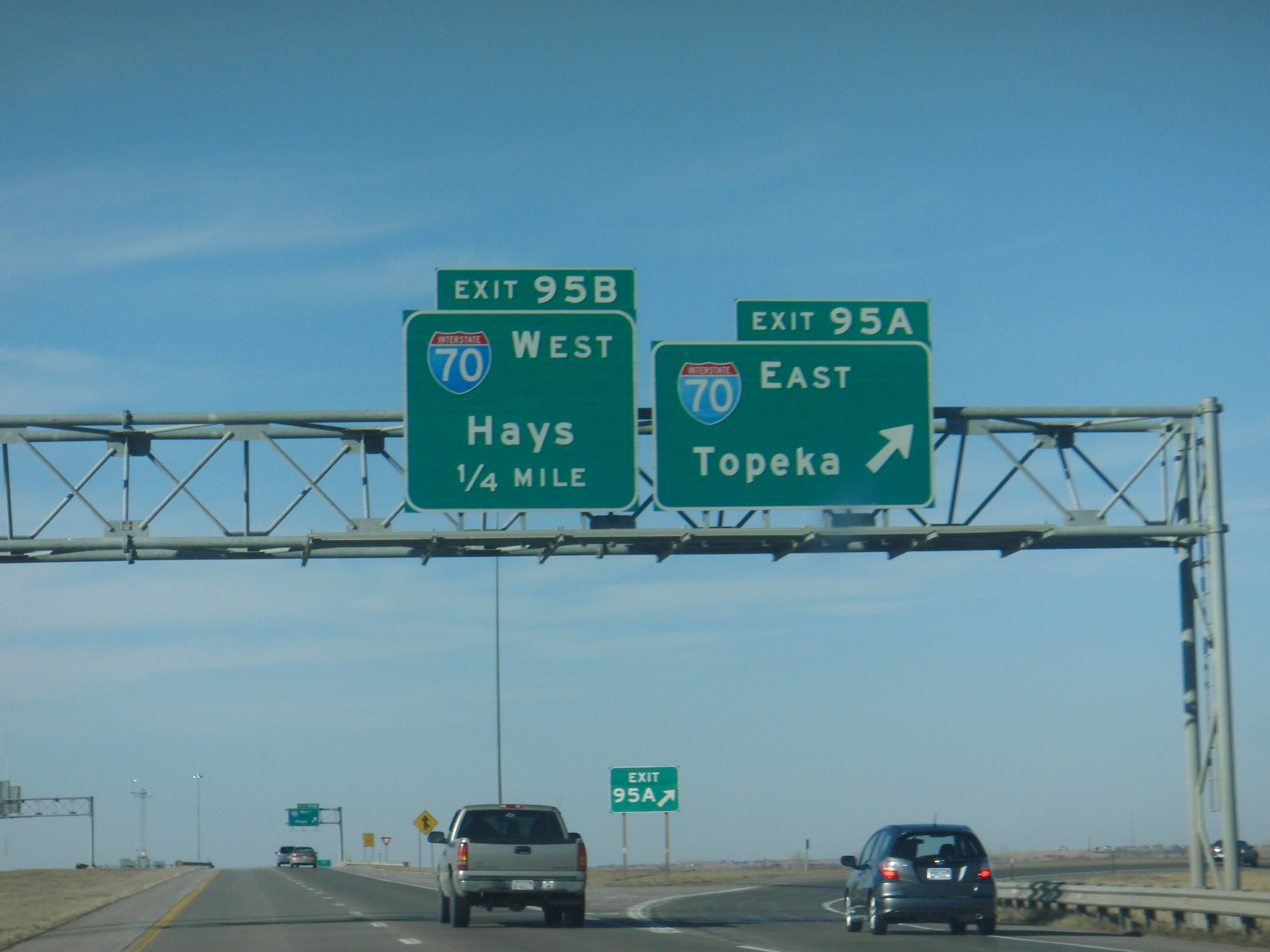
I-135 ends at this interchange with I-70; US-81 continues north.

The route ends on the northwest side of Salina, at its intersection at I-70. The road continues as US-81 north of this interchange.

== History ==
Interstate 35W
- Existed: 1971–September 13, 1976

Construction on the Canal Route portion of I-135 (in Wichita, where the Chisholm Creek Canal runs through the median of the highway) was begun in 1971. This portion of the route took eight years to complete with a cost of $32 million (equivalent to $111 million in 2024). It was built through the middle of the city's African-American neighborhood, known as McAdams.

Until September 13, 1976, I-135 was signed as Interstate 35W (I-35W). The Interstate's full length was completed in December 1979.

In 2021, work began to rebuild the northern junction with I-235 in Wichita. A two-lane flyover ramp connecting northbound I-135 to southbound I-235 which replaced the previous one-lane loop ramp opened on May 31, 2023. Further work on the interchange will continue into 2028. The total project required a subsidy of approximately $177 million.

In the 2020s, the entire I-135 corridor was designated as an Alternative Fuel Corridor for electric vehicles.

== Exit list ==
County	Location	mi	km	Exit	Destinations	Notes
Sedgwick	Wichita	0.00– 0.43	0.00– 0.69		I-35 / Kansas Turnpike – Oklahoma City, Kansas City	Southern terminus; Kansas Turnpike toll booth; I-35/Kansas Tpke. exit 42; trumpet interchange
Sedgwick	Wichita	0.46	0.74	1A	US-81 south (47th Street South)	South end of US-81 overlap; last free exit southbound
Sedgwick	Wichita	0.81	1.30	1C	I-235 north	Left exit and entrance northbound; I-235 exit 1A southbound (to I-135 north); tri-stack interchange; former US 81 Byp. north
Sedgwick	Wichita	2.32	3.73	2	Hydraulic Avenue	
Sedgwick	Wichita	3.21	5.17	3A	K-15 south (Southeast Boulevard)	Southbound exit and northbound entrance; south end of K-15 overlap
Sedgwick	Wichita	3.94	6.34	3B	Pawnee Street	
Sedgwick	Wichita	4.93	7.93	4	Harry Street	
Sedgwick	Wichita	5.43	8.74	5A	Lincoln Street	
Sedgwick	Wichita	5.96	9.59	5B	US-54 / US-400 (Kellogg Avenue)	Signed as exit 6A southbound
Sedgwick	Wichita	6.60– 6.76	10.62– 10.88	6B	1st Street North, 2nd Street North	Signed as exit 6C southbound
Sedgwick	Wichita	6.98	11.23	7A	Central Avenue	Southbound exit and northbound entrance
Sedgwick	Wichita	7.48	12.04	7B	8th Street North, 9th Street North	
Sedgwick	Wichita	8.02	12.91	8	13th Street North	
Sedgwick	Wichita	9.00	14.48	9	21st Street North	
Sedgwick	Wichita	10.57	17.01	10	K-96 east / 29th Street North, Hydraulic Avenue	Signed as exits 10A (K-96) and 10B (29th St., Hydraulic) northbound; south end of K-96 overlap
Sedgwick	Wichita	11.78	18.96	11A	I-235 south / K-96 west – Hutchinson	North end of K-96 overlap; I-235 exits 16A-B; I-235 is former US 81 Byp. south
Sedgwick	Wichita	11.78	18.96	11B	K-254 east – El Dorado	Left exit and entrance southbound
Sedgwick	Wichita	13.21	21.26	13	53rd Street North	
Sedgwick	Park City	14.23	22.90	14	61st Street North	
Sedgwick	Kechi–Grant township line	16.25	26.15	16	77th Street North	
Sedgwick	Grant Township	17.23	27.73	17	85th Street North	
Sedgwick	Grant Township	19.23	30.95	19	101st Street North	
Sedgwick–Harvey county line	Grant–Darlington township line	22.27	35.84	22	125th Street North	
Harvey	Darlington Township	25.27	40.67	25	K-196 east – Whitewater, El Dorado	
Harvey	Newton	28.28	45.51	28	SE 36th Street (CR 576)	
Harvey	Newton	30.11– 30.32	48.46– 48.80	30	US-50 west / K-15 north – Hutchinson	South end of US-50 overlap; north end of K-15 overlap; serves Newton Medical Center; left exit and entrance northbound
Harvey	Newton	31.34– 31.87	50.44– 51.29	31	First Street, Broadway Street	
Harvey	Newton	32.65	52.55	33	US-50 east – Peabody, Emporia	Northbound exit and southbound entrance; north end of US-50 overlap
Harvey	Newton	34.78	55.97	34	K-15 – North Newton, Abilene	
Harvey	Hesston	40.52	65.21	40	Lincoln Boulevard	
McPherson	Mound Township	46.10	74.19	46	K-260 west – Moundridge	Counterclockwise terminus of K-260; serves Mercy Hospital and Moundridge Municipal Airfield
McPherson	Mound Township	48.68	78.34	48	K-260 east – Moundridge	Clockwise terminus of K-260; serves Mercy Hospital
McPherson	Lone Tree–King City township line	54.44	87.61	54	Comanche Road (CR 445) / 18th Avenue (CR 319)	
McPherson	King City Township	58.39	93.97	58	US 81 Bus. / K-61 – McPherson, Hutchinson	
McPherson	McPherson	60.51	97.38	60	US-56 / US 81 Bus. – McPherson, Marion	
McPherson	McPherson Township	62.94	101.29	63	Mohawk Road	Opened 2017
McPherson	New Gottland Township	65.93	106.10	65	Pawnee Road (CR 448)	
McPherson	New Gottland Township	68.03– 68.60	109.48– 110.40	Rest Area, located in the median; left exits and entrances		
McPherson	Smoky Hill Township	72.93	117.37	72	Smoky Valley Road (CR 429) – Lindsborg, Roxbury	Former US 81 Bus. north, previously signed as I-135 BL north
Saline	Smoky View Township	77.86	125.30	78	K-4 west (Old Highway 81) – Bridgeport, Lindsborg	South end of K-4 overlap; former US 81 Bus. south, previously signed as I-135 BL south
Saline	Smoky View Township	81.96	131.90	82	K-4 east (Assaria Road) / Falun Road	North end of K-4 overlap
Saline	Smolan Township	86.01	138.42	86	K-104 east (Mentor Road) / Smolan Road	
Saline	Salina	88.00	141.62	88	Water Well Road	
Saline	Salina	89.03	143.28	89	Schilling Road	
Saline	Salina	90.04	144.91	90	Magnolia Road	
Saline	Salina	92.39	148.69	92	Crawford Street	
Saline	Salina	93.43	150.36	93	K-140 west (State Street)	
Saline	Salina	95.74	154.08	95A-B	US-81 north / I-70 / US-40 – Concordia, Topeka, Hays	Northern terminus; north end of US-81 overlap; signed as exits 95A (I-70 east) and 95B (I-70 west); I-70 exits 250A-B; freeway continues north as US-81 (Frank Carlson Memorial Highway); cloverleaf interchange.
1.000 mi = 1.609 km; 1.000 km = 0.621 mi: Concurrency terminus; Incomplete access; Tolled

== Business loops ==
There is 1 current business loop and 1 former business loop.

=== McPherson business loop ===
Interstate 135 Business
- Location: McPherson
- Length: 7.5 mi (12.1 km)

It starts at exit 58 and ends on exit 60. It has a concurrency with KS-61, and US-56.

=== Former Lindsborg business loop ===
Interstate 135 Business
- Location: Lindsborg
- Length: 8.9 mi (14.3 km)

It started on exit 72 and ended on exit 78. It had a concurrency with K-4.
