= McPherson, Kansas =

City in McPherson County, Kansas

- City and County seat
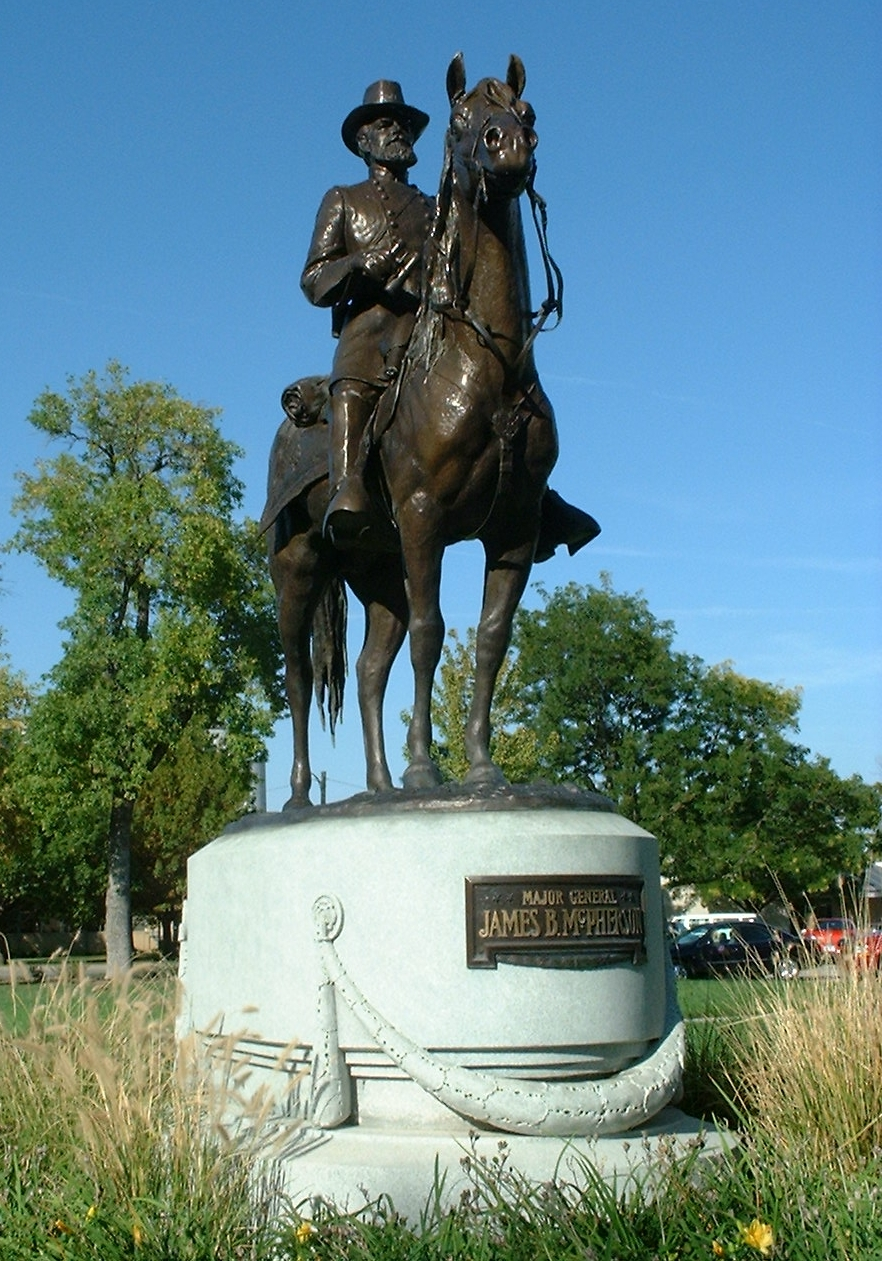
- Sculpture of James B. McPherson (2004)

- Location within McPherson County and Kansas

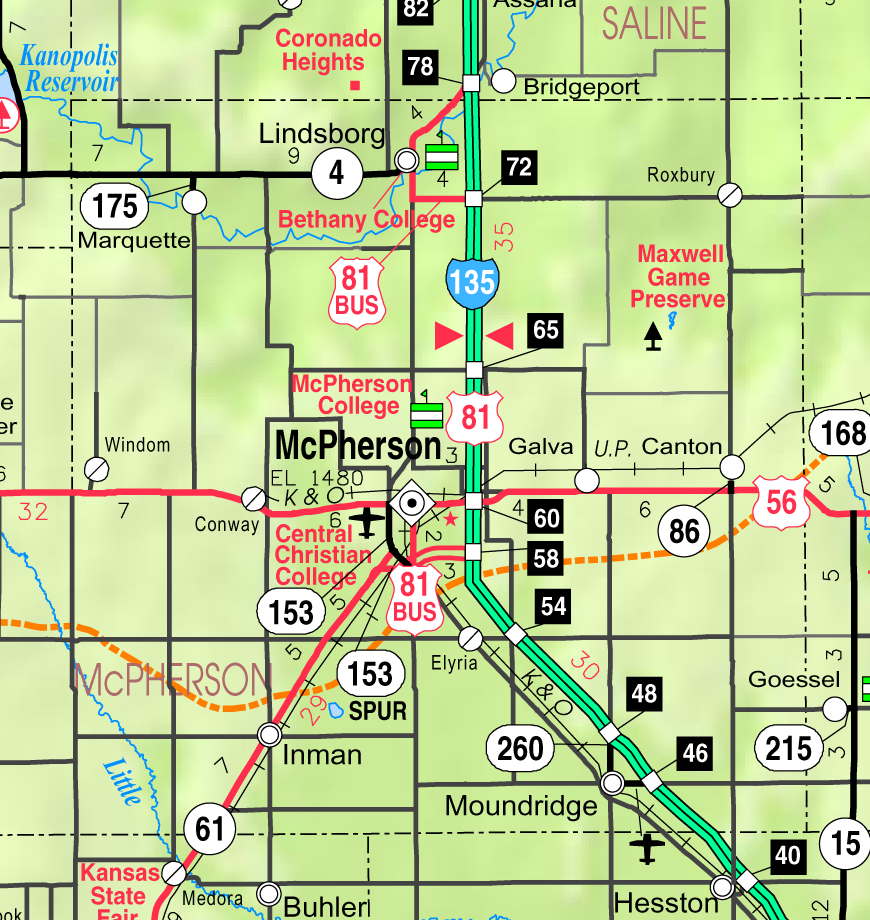
- KDOT map of McPherson County (legend)
- Coordinates: 38°22′17″N 97°39′38″W
- Country: United States
- State: Kansas
- County: McPherson
- Founded: 1870
- Incorporated: 1874
- Named for: James B. McPherson

Area
  - Total: 7.48 sq mi (19.38 km^{2})
  - Land: 7.43 sq mi (19.25 km^{2})
  - Water: 0.050 sq mi (0.13 km^{2})
- Elevation: 1,493 ft (455 m)

Population (2020)
  - Total: 14,082
  - Density: 1,895/sq mi (731.5/km^{2})
- Time zone: UTC-6 (CST)
  - Summer (DST): UTC-5 (CDT)
- ZIP Code: 67460
- Area code: 620
- FIPS code: 20-43950
- GNIS ID: 485617
- Website: mcpcity.com

McPherson (/məkˈfɜːrsən/ mək-FUR-sən) is a city in and the county seat of McPherson County, Kansas, United States. As of the 2020 census, the population of the city was 14,082. The city is named after Union General James Birdseye McPherson, a Civil War general. It is home to McPherson College and Central Christian College.

== History ==
=== 19th century ===
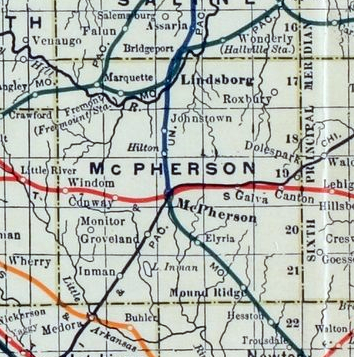
1915 railroad map of McPherson County

For millennia, the land now known as Kansas was inhabited by Native Americans. In 1803, most of modern Kansas was secured by the United States as part of the Louisiana Purchase. In 1854, the Kansas Territory was organized, then in 1861 Kansas became the 34th U.S. state. In 1867, McPherson County was founded.

McPherson was founded in 1870 by the twelve members of the McPherson Town Company. In 1887, city officials began a failed attempt to have the community named the state capital.

The first post office in McPherson was established in 1873. McPherson was incorporated as a city in 1874.

As early as 1875, city leaders of Marion held a meeting to consider a branch railroad from Florence. In 1878, Atchison, Topeka and Santa Fe Railway and parties from Marion and McPherson counties chartered the Marion and McPherson Railway Company. In 1879, a branch line was built from Florence to McPherson. In 1880 it was extended to Lyons and in 1881 it was extended to Ellinwood. The line was leased and operated by the Atchison, Topeka and Santa Fe Railway. The line from Florence to Marion was abandoned in 1968. In 1992, the line from Marion to McPherson was sold to Central Kansas Railway. In 1993, after heavy flood damage, the line from Marion to McPherson was abandoned. The original branch line connected Florence, Marion, Canada, Hillsboro, Lehigh, Canton, Galva, McPherson, Conway, Windom, Little River, Mitchell, Lyons, Chase and Ellinwood.

In 1887, the Chicago, Kansas and Nebraska Railway built a main line from Herington through McPherson to Pratt. In 1888, this line was extended to Liberal. Later, it was extended to Tucumcari, New Mexico and El Paso, Texas. It foreclosed in 1891 and taken over by Chicago, Rock Island and Pacific Railway, which shut down in 1980 and reorganized as Oklahoma, Kansas and Texas Railroad, merged in 1988 with Missouri Pacific Railroad, merged in 1997 with Union Pacific Railroad. Most locals still refer to this railroad as the "Rock Island".

By 1888, the community was at the junction of four railroad lines. Major industries have included a large flour mill, an insurance company headquarters, and an oil refinery.

=== 20th century ===
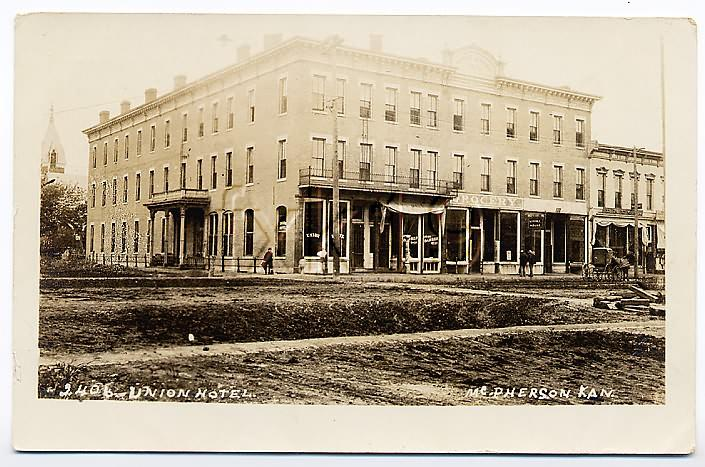
McPherson Union Hotel, 1907 postcard

==== Transportation ====
The National Old Trails Road, also known as the Ocean-to-Ocean Highway, was established in 1912, and was routed through Windom, Conway and McPherson.

==== Synthetic diamond ====
In 1926, Dr. J. Willard Hershey of McPherson College -- replicating experiments of other scientists -- claimed to have produced a synthetic diamond, among the first to have done so. (Subsequently, other experimenters could not reproduce their synthesis, drawing doubt about Hershey's claim).

==== Oil Refinery ====
In the late 1920s, oil was discovered in McPherson County, Kansas. As a result, the Globe Oil & Refining Company, (subsidiary of Lario Oil & Gas Company), constructed an oil refinery in the county seat: McPherson. Built in 1933, the refinery was soon producing 200,000 gallons of gasoline per day. This output necessitated a marketing campaign to promote the growing retail gasoline business. Lario, like many in the early radio days and before television, sponsored Amateur Athletic Union (AAU) basketball teams to generate excitement for their product in the sport sections of widely read newspapers. For a small sponsorship fee, Lario Oil & Gas was able to reach many more consumers than by conventional advertising.

==== First Olympic basketball champions ====
In the 1930s, the local refinery sponsored the McPherson Globe Refiners basketball team in the (AAU-- basketball's official sanctioning organization at the time). They were coached by Gene Johnson, former head coach of Wichita University (now Wichita State University). Coach Johnson was one of the innovators of the fast break and full-court press.

The Refiners were best known for their tall centers, Joe Fortenberry (6–8) and Willard Schmidt (6–9) and their fast-break style of play. Billed as "The Tallest Team in the World", the Refiners often held their opponents to low scores because of the centers' ability to deflect shots on the way to the basket in what today would be called goaltending. The team invented the "dunk" (so named by Arthur J. Daley, a New York Times sports writer who witnessed it); two of the team's tallest players would demonstrate the technique before a game, to entertain the crowd and intimidate opponents, though the technique was not normally allowed in actual play.

The Refiners won the AAU national championship in 1936 against the Hollywood Universal team. This earned them the right to compete for the first ever USA Olympic basketball team in 1936. Hollywood Universal narrowly beat the Refiners at Madison Square Garden and the USA team was composed of both Universal and Refiners players and one college student. Coach Johnson was selected to be the assistant coach. After a long journey by boat to Europe, the team played in alternating squads at the Olympics. The Refiners' portion of the team took the court to defeat Canada 19–8 in the final gold medal game on August 14, 1936, at the Summer Olympics -- the first team ever awarded Olympic gold medals in basketball.

The Refiners' home court is now the McPherson Community Building at 121 East Marlin and can be toured by contacting the local Convention and Visitors Bureau. A mural in honor of the Refiners was completed in 2010 at the intersection of Kansas and Ash, south of their home court in preparation for the 75th anniversary celebration of their victory in 2011.

==== Aircraft production ====
From 1964 to 1967 (some say 1962 and 1967), the Alon company produced 245 "Alon Aircoupe" two-seat light planes in McPherson. The Aircoupe was an evolution of the influential and popular ERCO Ercoupe, originally developed in the late 1930s by Fred Weick for Henry Berliner's Engineering Research Co. ("ERCO"), in the Washington, D.C. area. Following ERCO's production, design was then acquired by various companies before being acquired by Alon (a contraction of the names of Beech Aircraft Co. executives John Allen and Al Higdon, who formed Alon). The Alon company sold out to Mooney Aircraft of Kerrville, Texas, who took production there, producing a radically revised version as the Mooney M10 Cadet.

== Geography ==
According to the United States Census Bureau, the city has a total area of 7.23 square miles (18.73 km^{2}), of which 7.18 square miles (18.60 km^{2}) is land and 0.05 square miles (0.13 km^{2}) is water.

The community is located on U.S. Route 56, just west of Interstate 135. McPherson is part of the Little Arkansas River Watershed that ultimately empties into the Arkansas River in Wichita. Dry Turkey Creek is a wet weather stream that composes several enhanced lakes within the city limits. It feeds the Lakeside Park Lagoon before crossing under East Euclid Street and Kansas Avenue, where it then forms Wall Park Lake.

South and west of town are four units of the reclaimed McPherson Valley Wetlands, acquired and managed by Kansas Department of Wildlife and Parks, Ducks Unlimited, and the U.S. Fish and Wildlife Service. Prior to 1880, this natural wetlands was an important waterfowl and wildlife habitat second only to Cheyenne Bottoms in importance to migratory bird populations. These wetlands continue to see improvement and development.

=== Climate ===
The climate in this area is characterized by hot, humid summers and generally mild to cool winters. According to the Köppen Climate Classification system, McPherson has a humid subtropical climate, abbreviated "Cfa" on climate maps.

Climate data for McPherson, Kansas, 1991–2020 normals, extremes 1893–present
Month	Jan	Feb	Mar	Apr	May	Jun	Jul	Aug	Sep	Oct	Nov	Dec	Year
Record high °F (°C)	79 (26)	83 (28)	94 (34)	99 (37)	106 (41)	114 (46)	117 (47)	117 (47)	109 (43)	98 (37)	89 (32)	81 (27)	117 (47)
Mean maximum °F (°C)	64.7 (18.2)	69.7 (20.9)	79.6 (26.4)	85.9 (29.9)	92.5 (33.6)	98.0 (36.7)	103.3 (39.6)	101.7 (38.7)	97.2 (36.2)	88.8 (31.6)	75.2 (24.0)	64.2 (17.9)	104.6 (40.3)
Mean daily maximum °F (°C)	42.4 (5.8)	47.2 (8.4)	57.6 (14.2)	67.1 (19.5)	77.0 (25.0)	87.9 (31.1)	92.8 (33.8)	90.7 (32.6)	83.3 (28.5)	70.6 (21.4)	56.3 (13.5)	44.3 (6.8)	68.1 (20.1)
Daily mean °F (°C)	30.7 (−0.7)	34.6 (1.4)	44.4 (6.9)	53.9 (12.2)	64.7 (18.2)	75.6 (24.2)	80.6 (27.0)	78.5 (25.8)	70.4 (21.3)	57.5 (14.2)	43.8 (6.6)	33.3 (0.7)	55.7 (13.2)
Mean daily minimum °F (°C)	19.0 (−7.2)	22.0 (−5.6)	31.3 (−0.4)	40.6 (4.8)	52.3 (11.3)	63.4 (17.4)	68.3 (20.2)	66.3 (19.1)	57.6 (14.2)	44.4 (6.9)	31.4 (−0.3)	22.2 (−5.4)	43.2 (6.3)
Mean minimum °F (°C)	2.5 (−16.4)	5.8 (−14.6)	15.1 (−9.4)	26.4 (−3.1)	37.6 (3.1)	52.4 (11.3)	58.4 (14.7)	56.0 (13.3)	43.0 (6.1)	27.2 (−2.7)	15.7 (−9.1)	7.0 (−13.9)	−3.0 (−19.4)
Record low °F (°C)	−22 (−30)	−22 (−30)	−11 (−24)	9 (−13)	22 (−6)	32 (0)	47 (8)	43 (6)	27 (−3)	12 (−11)	−3 (−19)	−21 (−29)	−22 (−30)
Average precipitation inches (mm)	0.90 (23)	1.22 (31)	2.35 (60)	2.98 (76)	5.42 (138)	4.75 (121)	4.19 (106)	3.51 (89)	2.97 (75)	2.44 (62)	1.56 (40)	1.29 (33)	33.58 (854)
Average snowfall inches (cm)	4.1 (10)	3.3 (8.4)	2.6 (6.6)	0.6 (1.5)	0.0 (0.0)	0.0 (0.0)	0.0 (0.0)	0.0 (0.0)	0.0 (0.0)	0.1 (0.25)	0.6 (1.5)	2.9 (7.4)	14.2 (35.65)
Average precipitation days (≥ 0.01 in)	4.2	4.7	7.0	8.7	10.9	9.4	8.9	8.4	6.9	6.7	4.8	4.9	85.5
Average snowy days (≥ 0.1 in)	2.6	2.0	1.0	0.2	0.0	0.0	0.0	0.0	0.0	0.1	0.3	2.0	8.2
Source 1: NOAA
Source 2: National Weather Service

== Demographics ==
Historical population
Census	Pop.	Note	%±
1880	1,590		—
1890	3,172		99.5%
1900	2,996		−5.5%
1910	3,546		18.4%
1920	4,595		29.6%
1930	6,147		33.8%
1940	7,194		17.0%
1950	8,689		20.8%
1960	9,996		15.0%
1970	10,851		8.6%
1980	11,753		8.3%
1990	12,422		5.7%
2000	13,770		10.9%
2010	13,155		−4.5%
2020	14,082		7.0%
2025 (est.)	13,918		−1.2%
U.S. Decennial Census; 2010-2020

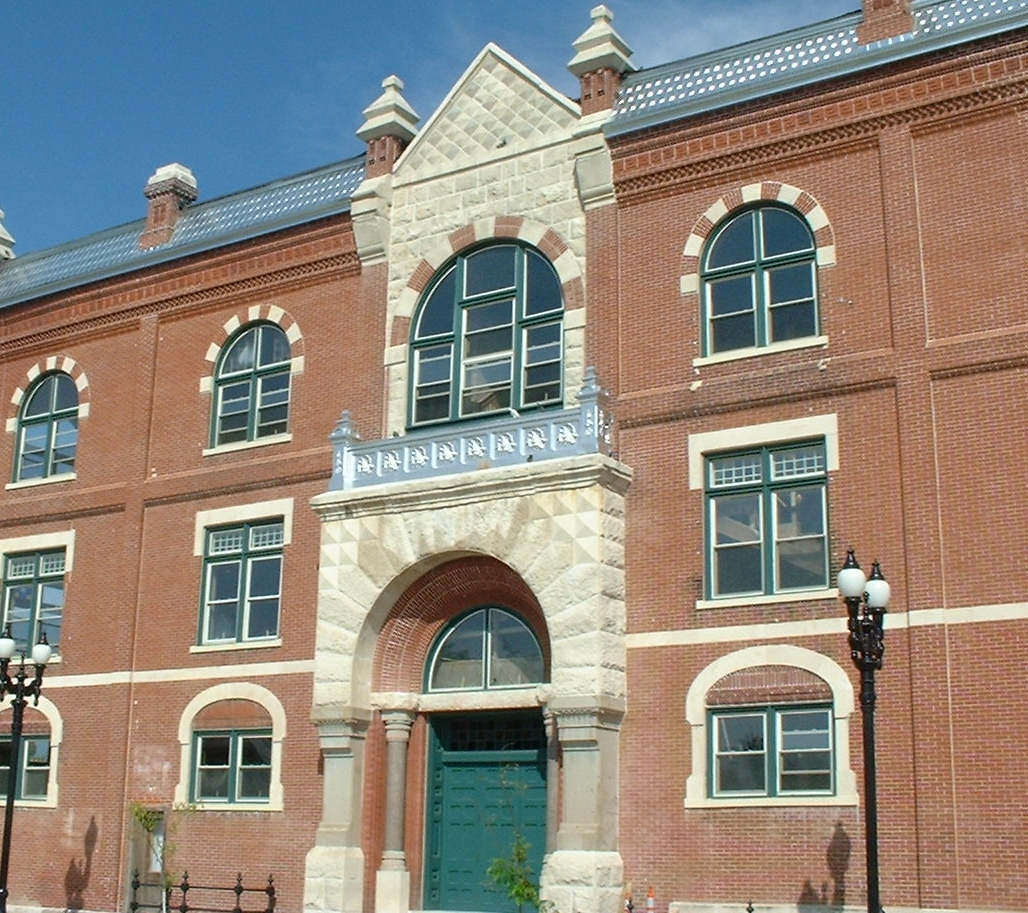
McPherson Opera House (2004)

=== 2020 census ===
As of the 2020 census, McPherson had a population of 14,082, with 5,645 households and 3,495 families. The median age was 37.2 years. 22.6% of residents were under age 18, 12.7% were from 18 to 24, 24.1% were from 25 to 44, 22.3% were from 45 to 64, and 18.3% were age 65 or older. For every 100 females, there were 100.9 males, and for every 100 females age 18 and over, there were 99.2 males age 18 and over.

99.3% of residents lived in urban areas, while 0.7% lived in rural areas.

There were 6,221 housing units, of which 9.3% were vacant. The homeowner vacancy rate was 2.6% and the rental vacancy rate was 10.9%. The population density was 1,891.7 per square mile (730.4/km^{2}), and housing density was 835.7 units per square mile (322.7 units/km^{2}).

There were 5,645 households in McPherson, of which 28.1% had children under the age of 18 living in them. Of all households, 47.9% were married-couple households, 20.7% were households with a male householder and no spouse or partner present, and 26.0% were households with a female householder and no spouse or partner present. About 32.6% of all households were made up of individuals and 13.1% had someone living alone who was 65 years of age or older.

Racial composition as of the 2020 census
Race	Number	Percent
White	11,970	85.0%
Black or African American	322	2.3%
American Indian and Alaska Native	116	0.8%
Asian	182	1.3%
Native Hawaiian and Other Pacific Islander	8	0.1%
Some other race	449	3.2%
Two or more races	1,035	7.3%
Hispanic or Latino (of any race)	1,053	7.5%

Non-Hispanic White residents made up 83.11% of the population.

2016–2020 American Community Survey

The 2016–2020 5-year American Community Survey estimates show that the average household size was 2.1 and the average family size was 2.6. The percent of those with a bachelor's degree or higher was estimated to be 18.4% of the population.

The 2016–2020 5-year American Community Survey estimates show that the median household income was $57,931 (with a margin of error of +/- $6,181) and the median family income was $69,846 (+/- $6,510). Males had a median income of $38,465 (+/- $4,682) versus $26,149 (+/- $1,423) for females. The median income for those above 16 years old was $32,004 (+/- $2,858). Approximately, 4.8% of families and 10.8% of the population were below the poverty line, including 7.9% of those under the age of 18 and 9.3% of those ages 65 or over.

== Area events ==
- Scottish Festival & Highland Games were held on the fourth weekend of September of each year. They are discontinued as of 2017.

== Education ==
McPherson College and Central Christian College are located in McPherson.

The community is served by McPherson USD 418 public school district. USD 418 has an Early Childhood center, four elementary schools (Eisenhower, Lincoln, Rosevelt, Washington), McPherson Middle School and McPherson High School. McPherson's mascot is the Bullpups. Additionally, private school options are available at St. Joseph Catholic Church & School, serving students through sixth grade.

== Transportation ==
McPherson was located on the National Old Trails Road, also known as the Ocean-to-Ocean Highway, that was established in 1912.

Bus service is provided daily towards Wichita and Salina by BeeLine Express (subcontractor of Greyhound Lines).

The Missouri Pacific Railroad formerly provided passenger rail service on a route from Eldorado although this had ended prior to 1946. As of 2025, the nearest passenger rail station is located in Hutchinson, where Amtrak's Southwest Chief stops once daily on a route from Chicago to Los Angeles.

== Media ==
McPherson has a daily newspaper, The McPherson Sentinel. and a weekly newspaper, The McPherson Weekly News,

The following radio stations are licensed to McPherson:

- 1540AM / 98.9FM KMCP: Classic Hits
- 96.7FM KMPK: Adult contemporary

== Notable people ==
- Jonathan Coachman, ESPN sports analyst and pro wrestler
- V. John Krehbiel, Ambassador to Finland
- Anna Larkin, folk sculptor, lived in McPherson for many years until her death.
- George Magerkurth, Major League Baseball umpire, born in McPherson.
- Sue Raney, jazz singer
- Brad Underwood, basketball coach at University of Illinois, McPherson native.

== See also ==
- List of people from McPherson County, Kansas
- National Register of Historic Places listings in McPherson County, Kansas
- Santa Fe Trail
- National Old Trails Road
- Threshing Stone
- List of oil pipelines
- List of oil refineries
