= Area code 620 =

Area code for southern Kansas, United States

Coordinates: 37.700°N 98.200°W

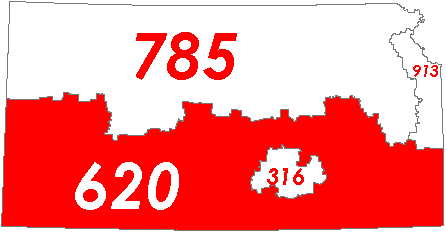
Map of Kansas with area code 620 in red

Area code 620 is a telephone area code in the North American Numbering Plan that covers most of the southern half of the U.S. state of Kansas, with the exception of the city of Wichita, Kansas and immediate surroundings, which in a 2001 area code split retained the original area code 316 assigned in 1947.

== History ==
Despite its relatively modest population, Kansas was divided into two numbering plan areas (NPAs) when the first North American telephone numbering plan was established in 1947. Under a preliminary plan, area codes were to be assigned sequentially based on geography and Kansas received area codes 617 and 618. When the final plan was adopted In October 1947, Kansas' two numbering plan areas were redrawn. The southern half (Wichita, Dodge City, Emporia, Garden City) received 316, while the northern half (Kansas City, Topeka, Lawrence, Salina, Hays) got 913.

The 316-913 dividing line ran from west to east roughly following a path along K-4 and K-96. It dipped along I-135 in McPherson County and continued east to just north of Emporia in Lyon County, and ended at the Missouri state line.

The north-south split avoided cutting the major toll traffic routes that ran in east-west directions, a primary rule of traffic and implementation cost analysis. The dividing line ran from west to east roughly following a path along Kansas Routes 4 and 96 from the Colorado state line eastward. It dipped along Interstate 135 in McPherson County and continued east to just north of Emporia in Lyon County, and then all the way to the Missouri state line.

On February 3, 2001, the southern numbering plan area was split and area code 316 was limited to just the Wichita metro area. The remaining part was renumbered with area code 620. The new numbering plan stretches across the southern half of the state, from the Colorado border in the west to the Missouri border in the east. It completely surrounds 316, which only serves Wichita and its inner suburbs, making it one of the six pairs of "doughnut area codes". Permissive dialing of 316 across southern Kansas continued until November 3, 2001.

The most populous cities in the 620 numbering plan area are Dodge City, Garden City, Hutchinson and Emporia.

620 was created due to the growing proliferation of cell phones in the Wichita area. With the great majority of the old 316's landlines and cell phones located in the Wichita area, 620 is one of the most thinly populated area codes in the nation. Based on projections in 2024, southern Kansas will not need another area code until about 2029.

Prior to October 2021, area code 620 had telephone numbers assigned for the central office code 988. In 2020, 988 was designated nationwide as a dialing code for the National Suicide Prevention Lifeline, which created a conflict for exchanges that permit seven-digit dialing. This area code was therefore scheduled to transition to ten-digit dialing by October 24, 2021.

== Service area ==
The major cities in the numbering plan area are:

- Arkansas City
- Caney
- Coffeyville
- Chanute
- Dodge City
- Emporia
- Fort Scott
- Fredonia
- Frontenac
- Garden City
- Great Bend
- Hutchinson
- Liberal
- McPherson
- Newton
- Pittsburg
- Pratt
- Independence
- Iola
- Parsons
- Scott City
- Wellington
- Winfield

=== Boundaries ===
The boundary between area codes 620 and 785 runs from west to east roughly following a path along K-4 and K-96. The code boundary dips along I-135 in McPherson County and continues east to just north of Emporia in Lyon County along the Kansas Turnpike, where the boundaries of area codes 620, 785 and 913 meet. Area code 620 shares its northern boundary with area code 913's southern boundary, ending south of the Kansas City metropolitan area.

All of Sedgwick County, along with parts of Butler, Harvey, Kingman, Reno and Sumner counties, remain in area code 316.

Kansas area codes: 316, 620, 785, 913
	North: 785, 913	
West: 719	620 completely surrounds 316	East: 417
	South: 580, 918/539	
Colorado area codes: 303/720/983, 719, 748/970
Missouri area codes: 314/557, 417, 573/235, 636, 660, 816/975
Oklahoma area codes: 405/572, 580, 918/539
