= Mr. Kansas Basketball =

Basketball award in Kansas

The Mr. Kansas Basketball honor recognizes the best high school basketball player in the state of Kansas as voted on by the Kansas Basketball Coaches Association. The table below also includes the players' college, as well as whether they were drafted into the NBA.

Five different schools have had multiple winners; McPherson has the most. Hayden in Topeka, Leavenworth, Topeka West, and Wichita South have also had multiple winners. Kansas has had the most Mr. Kansas basketball commits, with seven. Only six winners of the award have been drafted into the NBA.

== Award winners ==
Year	Player	High school	College	NBA draft
1983	Tom Meier	Hayden	Washburn	
1984	Danny Manning	Lawrence	Kansas	1988 NBA draft: 1st round, 1st overall by the Los Angeles Clippers
1985	Danny Kingcannon	Topeka Highland Park		
1986	Steve Henson	McPherson	Kansas State	1990 NBA draft: 2nd round, 44th overall by the Milwaukee Bucks
1987	J. T. Marshall	Manhattan	Texas State	
1988	Gaylon Nickerson	Wichita North	Wichita State*	1994 NBA draft: 2nd round, 34th overall by the Atlanta Hawks
1989	Val Barnes	Wichita South	Iowa	
1990	Tony Arrington	Topeka	Washburn	
1991	Brian Henson	McPherson	Kansas State	
1992	Ryan Herrs	McPherson	Wichita State	
1993	B. J. Williams	Wichita South	Kansas	
1994	C. B. McGrath	Topeka West	Kansas	
1995	Kris Weems	Schlagle	Stanford	
1996	Josh Reid	Brewster	Kansas State	
1997	Brett McFall	Olathe South	Wyoming	
1998	John Crider	Horton	Washburn	
1999	Quentin Buchanan	Junction City	Kansas State	
2000	Matt Freije	Shawnee Mission West	Vanderbilt	2004 NBA draft: 2nd round, 54th overall by the Miami Heat
2001	Wayne Simien	Leavenworth	Kansas	2005 NBA draft: 1st round, 29th overall by the Miami Heat
2002	Taj Gray	Wichita East	Oklahoma	
2003	Aubrey Bruner	McPherson	Barton County CC; Central Arkansas	
2004	Jordan Fithian	McPherson	Binghamton	
2005	Jay Tunnell	Topeka West	Indiana State	
2006	Ryan Wedel	Minneapolis	Drake	
2007	Tyrel Reed	Burlington	Kansas	
2008	Jordan Cyphers	Wichita Southeast	Tennessee State	
2009	Jeff Reid	Hayden	Washburn	
2010	Nino Williams	Leavenworth	Kansas State	
2011	Christian Ulsaker	McPherson	Washburn	
2012	Perry Ellis	Wichita Heights	Kansas	
2013	No award			
2014	No award			
2015	Dean Wade	St. John	Kansas State	
2016	Drew Pyle	McPherson	Washburn	
2017	Matt Pile	Goddard Eisenhower	Omaha	
2018	Ben Pyle	McPherson	Western Illinois	
2019	Christian Braun	Blue Valley Northwest	Kansas	2022 NBA draft: 1st round, 21st overall by the Denver Nuggets
2020	Xavier Bell	Andover Central	Drexel	
2021	Sterling Chapman	Campus	Tulsa	
2022	Elijah Brooks	Topeka West	North Dakota	
2023	Grant Stubblefield	Blue Valley Northwest	Omaha	
2024	TJ Williams	Wichita Heights	Wichita State	
2025	Gabe Pyle	McPherson	Hutchinson CC	
2026	Kelan Gruver	Bonner Springs		

*Committed to Wichita State out of high school, but transferred out after his freshman year, eventually playing for multiple colleges

== Multiple winners by school ==
=== By high school ===
School	Number of awards	Years
McPherson	9	1986, 1991, 1992, 2003, 2004, 2011, 2016, 2018, 2025
Topeka West	3	1994, 2005, 2022
Blue Valley Northwest	2	2019, 2023
Hayden	2	1983, 2009
Leavenworth	2	2001, 2010
Wichita Heights	2	2012, 2024
Wichita South	2	1989, 1993

=== By college ===
School	Number of awards	Years
Kansas	7	1984, 1993, 1994, 2001, 2007, 2012, 2019
Kansas State	6	1986, 1991, 1996, 1999, 2010, 2015
Washburn	6	1983, 1990, 1998, 2009, 2011, 2016
Wichita State	3	1988, 1992, 2024
Omaha	2	2017, 2023

== See also ==
- Miss Kansas Basketball
