= Linwood Elementary School =

Linwood Elementary School can refer to:

- Linwood Elementary School (California)
- Linwood Elementary School (Kansas)
- Linwood Elementary School (Georgia)
- Linwood Elementary School (Pennsylvania)
