= Northeast Magnet High School =

Location
- 5550 North Lycee; Bel Aire, Kansas 67226; United States; 37.7849°N 97.2390°W

Information
- School type: Public, Magnet High School
- Established: 1990
- School board: www.usd259.org/boe
- School district: Wichita USD 259
- CEEB code: 173183
- Principal: Ben Myrick
- Teaching staff: 489.80 (FTE)
- Grades: 9 to 12
- Gender: coed
- Enrollment: 681 (2023-2024)
- Student to teacher ratio: 13.67
- Campus type: Urban
- Colors: Purple; Silver
- Mascot: Griffin
- Communities served: Wichita, Bel Aire, Eastborough, Kechi, Park City
- Website: School website

Northeast Magnet High School, known locally as Northeast, is a public magnet high school in Bel Aire, Kansas, United States. It is operated by Wichita USD 259 school district. Northeast Magnet High School was the first magnet high school in Kansas. The magnet areas at Northeast include visual arts, science, and law. Students are also exposed to mathematics and language arts. Since it is a pure (non-neighborhood) magnet school, there is no district boundary placed by the school district, meaning any high school age student within the Wichita district limits, can attend the school without requiring a special transfer, they still, however, are required to apply for the school, then students are selected at random to attend.

== History ==
In 1988, the district administration surveyed all eighth through eleventh grade students in the district to determine what special or choice high school programs would be most attractive. The responses indicated a very strong interest in science/technology as well as the visual arts. Northeast Magnet High School opened in 1990 as a secondary school of choice in the Community Education Center, originally called Mathewson Intermediate School. The Community Education Center site was chosen because of its proximity to Wichita State University. The colleges of Engineering and Fine Arts helped in the development of the program. Necessary remodeling was done and the Northeast Magnet High School began in August 1990 with the magnet choices of science/technology and visual art.

In 1996, Northeast Magnet merged with the Downtown Law Magnet program, and in 1998, the law program moved from City Hall to its current location.

In the early 2000s the school was updated through the passed bond issue. Renovations included, but were not limited to, the cafeteria and science classrooms.

In 2008, a bond issue was approved to build 5 new schools in USD 259, which included a new high school. It was decided the new high school would replace the existing Northeast Magnet High School at 1847 North Chautauqua Street in Wichita. The new school is located approximately 6 miles northeast of the older school. In the fall of 2012, the new Northeast Magnet High School was opened to students.

Northeast Magnet has been ranked as #7 best high school in Kansas according to US News.

== Academics ==
Northeast Magnet's schedule utilizes a seven 45-minute classes per day. Students at Northeast Magnet focus on only seven subjects per semester. This is intended to allow students the opportunity for more in-depth knowledge and understanding. Wichita Northeast Magnet consists of an academic core of English, mathematics, science and social studies. Math is not required all four years although it's required for eligibility for scholarships. Science magnet students graduate with eight science credits, with all students expected to have four science credits. Students are expected to graduate with a minimum of four social studies credits. Elective courses are limited with all students encouraged to complete a minimum of two credits of Spanish. Northeast Magnet also offers courses and opportunities that are typically not available at other schools. Forensics, aviation, mock trial, engineering, mentorship and other courses are available for students. Off-campus opportunities through city arts, local galleries and professional settings are also available. Several students also enroll concurrently at Wichita State University and WATC for special courses or general requirements for college.

Northeast Magnet offers a student of the year award. This awarding system was established in the 2008–2009 school year. Towards the end of the school year, the school faculty vote and decide on choosing six students from the four grade levels to be nominated for the award. Out of the six chosen students, only two obtain the award. The award is based upon student leadership and how they interact in their community. After the two winning students are picked, the awards are presented at the "Evening of Excellence" held in the spring.

Each year, every student must complete a magnet project. Projects are intended to challenge students in the areas of research, writing, data collection, production, presentation and technology. All students present their projects at Magnet Fairs held during the year. Additionally, progress reports are given to students each week throughout the school year.

=== Programs ===
The science program offered at Northeast Magnet prepares students to continue their education in four-year programs focusing in medical and engineering fields. The science department helps students connect with mentors (physicians, engineers, lab technicians, etc.), complete magnet science projects and fulfill an academic course load. Partners include the City of Wichita (Water and Sewer Department, Botanica), the University of Kansas Medical Center, Newman University, the Great Plains Nature Center, Lake Afton Observatory, Raytheon, and others. The visual arts program concentrates on several mediums: sculpture and pottery, drawing and painting, glass blowing, fibers, weaving, silversmith, photography, computer art and video education. Local galleries, the Wichita Art Museum, CityArts, Trees for Life International, Wichita State University, the Wichita Center for the Arts and other organizations provide additional opportunities to display their work and learn from these community activities. The law program is for students interested in further study of law-related fields: criminal and civil law, law enforcement, and public or social service. The curriculum is driven by community service and legal research in partnership with the Wichita Bar Association, the City of Wichita, United Way, Wichita Festivals, Inc. and many generous individual mentors.

Each student completes magnet area and other projects each year, leading to the Magnet Area Certificate. These projects require research, writing, data-collecting, and presentation skills.

== Extracurricular activities ==
=== Athletics ===
Northeast does not have any sports teams. Students that wish to play sports do so at the school in their district based on their home address.

=== Other programs ===
Other clubs and organizations offered to students at Northeast Magnet include student council, Marine JROTC, National Honor Society, cultural clubs, robotics, Scholars Bowl, drama, music productions, Crime Stoppers, HOSA (Health Occupations Students of America), GIRLS club (Girls In Real Life STEAM), Tri-M and many more.

== See also ==
- Education in Kansas
- List of high schools in Kansas
- List of unified school districts in Kansas
