= Miss Kansas Basketball =

Kansas basketball award

The Miss Kansas Basketball honor recognizes the top girls' high school basketball player in the state of Kansas. The award is presented annually by the Kansas Basketball Coaches Association.

== Award winners ==
Year	Player	High School	College	WNBA draft
1983	Susan Green	Chaparral	Kansas State	
1984	Denae Stensaas	Concordia		
1985	Amy Bullock	Norton	Nebraska	
1986	Kelly St. Clair	Baxter Springs		
1987	Rachelle Roulier	Colby	UCLA	
1988	Robin Baker	Buhler	Duke	
1989	Nicole Coates	Leavenworth		
1990	Kelly Dougherty	Leavenworth		
1991	Ann Hollingsworth	Manhattan	Wichita State	
1992	Rachel Matakas	Olathe South		
1993	Lorrie Wells	Southwestern Heights		
1994	Jennifer Dieterich	Ottawa	Kansas	
1995	Kate Benson	Shawnee Mission South	Nebraska	
1996	Nicky Ramage	Little River	Kansas State	
1997	Jackie Stiles	Claflin	Southwest Missouri State	2001 WNBA draft: 1st Rnd, 4th overall by the Portland Fire
1998 (tie)	Amy Prose	Little River		
1998 (tie)	Amber Prose	Little River		
1999	Shahidrah Roberts	Blue Valley North	Nebraska	
2000	Jeneka Joyce	Washburn Rural	Notre Dame	
2001	Kendra Wecker	Marysville	Kansas State	2005 WNBA draft: 1st Rnd, 4th overall by the San Antonio Silver Stars
2002	Sarah Klaassen	Remington	Missouri State	
2003	Brooke Ubelaker	Osborne	Washburn	
2004	Carolyn McCullough	St. Thomas Aquinas	Kansas State	
2005	Shalee Lehning	Sublette	Kansas State	2009 WNBA draft: 2nd Rnd, 25th overall by the Atlanta Dream
2006	Ashley Sweat	McPherson	Kansas State	
2007	Brittney Miller	Paola		
2008	Bailey Gee	Andover Central	Missouri	
2009	Lindsey Keller	Goddard	Oklahoma State	
2010	Tiffany Bias	Andover Central	Oklahoma State	
2011	Natalie Knight	Olathe South	Kansas	
2012				
2013	Katelyn Loecker	McPherson	Oklahoma State	
2014	Kaylee Page	Wamego	Kansas State	
2015	Morgan Ediger	Cimmaron	Tabor College	
2016	Reagan Phelan	Central Plains	Washburn University	
2017	Katy Heger	Hugoton	Washburn University	
2018	Taylor Robertson	McPherson	Oklahoma	
2019	Carly Bachelor	Washburn Rural	Creighton	
2020	Emily Ryan	Central Plains	Iowa State	
2021	Kylee Scheer	Cheney	Emporia State, UNLV	
2022	Aubrie Kierscht	Salina Central	Presbyterian	
2023	Talexa Weeter	Goodland	Fort Hays State	
2024	Alana Shetlar	Andover	Oral Roberts	

=== Schools with multiple winners ===
School	Number of Awards	Years
Andover Central	3	2008, 2010, 2024
McPherson	3	2006, 2013, 2018
Little River	3	1996, 1998(2)
Central Plains	2	2016, 2020
Leavenworth	2	1989, 1990
Olathe South	2	1992, 2011
Washburn Rural	2	2000, 2019

== See also ==
- Mr. Kansas Basketball
