= Arthur Brown (American football) =

American football player (born 1990)

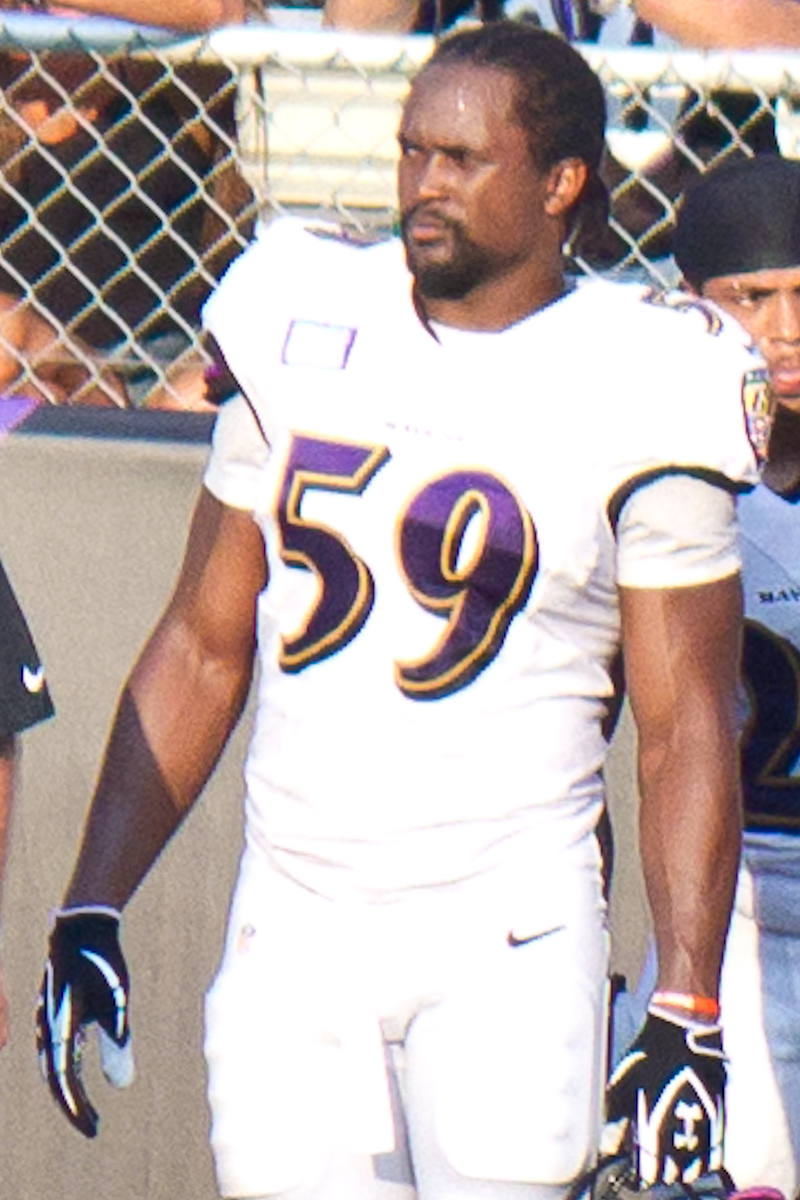
- Brown with the Baltimore Ravens in 2013

No. 59, 44
- Position: Linebacker

Personal information
- Born: June 17, 1990 (age 36); Wichita, Kansas, U.S.
- Listed height: 6 ft 0 in (1.83 m)
- Listed weight: 240 lb (109 kg)

Career information
- High school: Wichita East
- College: Miami (FL) (2008–2009); Kansas State (2010–2012)
- NFL draft: 2013: 2nd round, 56th overall pick

Career history
- Baltimore Ravens (2013–2015); Jacksonville Jaguars (2016); New York Jets (2016); Seattle Seahawks (2017)*; San Antonio Commanders (2019)*
- * Offseason or practice squad member only

Awards and highlights
- Big 12 Defensive Player of the Year (2012); First-team All-American (2012); 2× First-team All-Big 12 (2011, 2012); Big 12 Defensive Newcomer of the Year (2011)

Career NFL statistics
- Total tackles: 20
- Sacks: 0.5
- Forced fumbles: 1
- Stats at Pro Football Reference

Arthur Brown Jr. (born June 17, 1990) is an American former professional football player who was a linebacker in the National Football League (NFL). He played college football for the Kansas State Wildcats, earning All-American honors. Brown was selected by the Baltimore Ravens in the second round of the 2013 NFL draft. He was also a member of the Jacksonville Jaguars, New York Jets, Seattle Seahawks, and San Antonio Commanders.

== Early life ==
Brown was born in Wichita, Kansas. He attended Wichita East High School in Wichita, and played high school football for the Wichita East Blue Aces. As a sophomore and junior he was a consensus first-team Class 6A all-state selection and as a junior he was named to the Wichita Eagle "Second 11" all-state team. Brown registered 154 tackles (111 solo) and 7 sacks as a sophomore starter at linebacker in 2005, but also rushed for 462 yards at fullback. As a junior, Brown had 158 tackles, eight sacks and an interception.

Brown attended the 2006 Oklahoma summer camp where he ran the 40-yard dash in 4.68 seconds. He also had an impressive performance at the 2007 U.S. Army Combine, and announced in June 2007 that he would participate in the 2008 U.S. Army All-American Bowl.

Pete Carroll said that Brown was the best linebacker that he had seen in seven years—referring to D. J. Williams—, while Bob Stoops predicted Brown would win the Dick Butkus Award two times. Primarily because of the Brown brothers, ESPNU nationally televised a matchup between East and Dodge City High School on September 7, 2007. Following the 2007 season, USA Today recognized him as a high school All-American.

Brown was considered the top prospect to come out of Wichita since Barry Sanders and Kamerion Wimbley. In September 2007, Brown announced that the schools he planned to visit were Alabama, Louisiana State, North Carolina, Miami (FL), and Southern California. Oklahoma, Kansas State, Georgia Tech, Florida, and Georgia, whom he had already visited, were still on his list of ten. Though some predicted Brown would ultimately choose Oklahoma, he eliminated OU along with Alabama, Georgia Tech, and Georgia in early November. On December 5, he eliminated Kansas State from his list. Brown was down to Louisiana State, North Carolina, Miami (FL), Southern California, and Florida, but with no clear front runner, when he held a press conference on December 17 at the Kansas Hall of Fame to announce his decision. He decided to attend the University of Miami.

== College career ==
Brown initially attended the University of Miami, and played for the Miami Hurricanes football team. He struggled during his freshman year despite being Miami's top-rated recruit. Hurricanes coach Randy Shannon decided to move Brown from weakside to inside linebacker for his sophomore season, saying he began flourishing in the new role toward the end of the 2008 season. "The last two weeks of the season he was phenomenal at middle linebacker on scout team. Like Ray Lewis, when he first got here he was outside and he wasn't very good," said Shannon.

Brown left the Miami program in February 2010. Brown, along with his brother Bryce, were named in a report from Yahoo! Sports alleging that student-athletes, coaches and administrators were aware and received impermissible benefits from ex-booster and convicted felon Nevin Shapiro.

He subsequently enrolled at Kansas State University in May 2010, and became a member of the Kansas State Wildcats football team. Brown's first season at Kansas State was very productive as he had 95 tackles, 2 sacks and 1 interception. Brown also contributed some key plays during the Wildcats 10–2 season, one such play included getting an interception off Heisman winning quarterback Robert Griffin III to set up game-winning field goal as the Wildcats beat #15 Baylor Bears. He was the first player last season to pick Griffin, ending his streak at 110 passing attempts. Brown also had a 12 tackle game beating the Iowa State Cyclones as Kansas State finished the regular season 10–2. Brown was named Big 12 newcomer of the year, becoming the tenth Wildcat to do so and the fourth in the past five years.

In the 2012 season, Brown won the 2012 Big 12 Conference Defensive Player of the Year award, after registering 91 tackles, 2 interceptions (one was returned for a touchdown), six tackles for loss and one sack. He is the third Kansas State player to win the defensive player of the year award as named by the conference, after Mark Simoneau in 1999, and Terence Newman in 2002.

In the May 2022, Kansas State announced Arthur Brown would be inducted into the Ring of Honor.

== Professional career ==
Pre-draft measurables
Height	Weight	Arm length	Hand span	40-yard dash	10-yard split	20-yard split	20-yard shuttle	Three-cone drill	Vertical jump	Broad jump	Bench press
6 ft 0 3/8 in (1.84 m)	241 lb (109 kg)	32 1/2 in (0.83 m)	10 in (0.25 m)	4.67 s	1.61 s	2.69 s	4.31 s	7.07 s	32.5 in (0.83 m)	9 ft 8 in (2.95 m)	21 reps
All values from NFL Combine/Pro Day

=== Baltimore Ravens ===
Projected a second-round selection, Brown was ranked as the No. 4 outside linebacker available in the 2013 NFL draft. He is compared to Daryl Washington, because "neither linebacker has the ideal size for their position, but they compensate with sideline-to-sideline speed". In the 2013 NFL Draft, the Baltimore Ravens picked Brown after their star middle linebacker Ray Lewis retired.

Brown underwent hernia surgery during the off-season a few weeks following the draft. Arthur was placed on injured reserve on January 1, 2015. On September 3, 2016, he was released by the Ravens.

=== Jacksonville Jaguars ===
The Jacksonville Jaguars claimed Brown off waivers on September 4, 2016. He was released by the Jaguars on December 6, 2016.

=== New York Jets ===
Brown was claimed off waivers by the Jets on December 7, 2016. He was released on December 19, 2016.

=== Seattle Seahawks ===
On March 17, 2017, Brown signed with the Seattle Seahawks. He was waived on July 31, 2017.

=== San Antonio Commanders ===
On January 4, 2019, Brown signed with the San Antonio Commanders of the Alliance of American Football. On January 30, 2019, he was released by the Commanders as part of the final training camp cuts.

== Personal life ==
Arthur is the son of Arthur Brown, Sr. and Lelonnie Brown. His uncle Lawrence Pete is a former Detroit Lions player, while his younger brother Bryce is a former NFL running back.

According to Jeremy Crabtree of Rivals.com, the Browns were the first brothers ever to both be ranked five-star recruits.
