= Taj Gray =

American basketball player (born 1984)

Personal information
- Born: March 14, 1984 (age 41) Wichita, Kansas, U.S.
- Listed height: 6 ft 8 in (2.03 m)
- Listed weight: 236 lb (107 kg)

Career information
- High school: Wichita East (Wichita, Kansas)
- College: Redlands CC (2002–2004); Oklahoma (2004–2006)
- NBA draft: 2006: undrafted
- Playing career: 2006–2018
- Position: Power forward / center

Career history
- 2006–2007: Cholet Basket
- 2007–2008: Paris-Levallois
- 2008–2009: Chorale Roanne
- 2009: Los Angeles Clippers
- 2009–2010: Élan Chalon
- 2010–2011: Murcia
- 2012: Elitzur Ashkelon
- 2012: Guayama Puerto Rico
- 2017: Lobos UAD Mazatlán
- 2018: Windsor Canada
- 2018: Hong Kong

Career highlights
- 2x First-team All-Big 12 (2005-2006); Big 12 All-Defensive team (2006); Big 12 Newcomer of the year (2005); NJCAA first-team All-American (2004); NJCAA second-team All-American (2003); Mr. Kansas Basketball (2002)

Taj Allen Gray (born March 14, 1984) is an American professional basketball player. He played college basketball for the Oklahoma Sooners.

== Early life ==
Gray played middle school AAU for Wichita Razorback under Coach Steve Winters. They were ranked #1 in Kansas and #5 in the Midwest.

Gray attended Wichita High School East and as a senior led his team to the Kansas Class 6A state title, earning tournament MVP honors. He was also named Kansas High School Player of the Year after averaging 20.9 points and 15.5 rebounds and 6.4 blocks per game during his senior season.

== College career ==
=== Junior college ===
Gray started his collegiate basketball career at Redlands Community College, where he was named second-team NJCAA All-American as a freshman and first-team All-American as a sophomore, finishing runner-up in the NJCAA Player of the Year balloting. Averaging 18.1 points, 10.8 rebounds and 3.3 block per game, he led Redlands to a 35–2 overall record and a national runner-up finish. In addition, he led the NJCAA Tournament with 12.3 rebounds per game and was named to the all-tourney team.

=== Oklahoma ===
A sought after junior college recruit, Gray transferred to the University of Oklahoma instead of signing with Arkansas, Kansas, Texas A&M and Texas Tech. In his first year at OU, the Sooners went 25–8, finished as the Big 12 co-champions and advanced to the second round of the 2005 NCAA Tournament. Gray averaged team-highs of 14.6 points and 8.2 rebounds per game, while posting a league second-best 12 double-doubles. Gray was named a first-team All-Big 12 selection by league coaches and was named Big 12 Newcomer of the Year.

Gray was named Big 12 Preseason Player of the Year before the start of his senior season and averaged 14.2 points, 7.7 rebounds and 1.6 blocked shots per games which were all team highs. He was named a first-team All-Big 12 pick by Sports Illustrated and was named to the Big 12 All-Defensive Team.

== Professional career ==
Although he was projected to be a second-round draft pick, Gray was not selected in the 2006 NBA draft. He was subsequently invited to play for the Sacramento Kings' summer league team, but was not signed to a contract.

On August 10, 2006 Gray announced that he would play for Cholet Basketball, an A League team in the Ligue Nationale de Basketball, the top men's French professional basketball league.

One year later, after a very good season in Cholet, he announced that he would play for Paris Basket Racing for one year.

Gray signed on to the French team Chorale Roanne for the 2008/2009 season where his averaging 22 ppg 11.2 rpg 3.2 blocks One year later, he signed on CB Murcia, to play in the LEB Oro, the Spanish second league.
