= Andrea Gardner =

American basketball player (born 1979)

Personal information
- Born: December 23, 1979 (age 46) Washington, D.C., U.S.
- Listed height: 6 ft 3 in (1.91 m)

Career information
- College: Howard (1999–2002)
- WNBA draft: 2002: 2nd round, 27th overall pick
- Drafted by: Utah Starzz
- Position: Forward / Center

Career history
- 2002: Utah Starzz
- 2008: Washington Mystics

Career highlights
- 2× MEAC Player of the Year (2001, 2002); MEAC Tournament MVP (2001); 2× First-team All-MEAC (2001, 2002); NCAA season rebounding leader (2001)
- Stats at Basketball Reference

Andrea Gardner (born December 23, 1979) is an American basketball player. She is 191 cm (6 ft 3 in) tall and weighs 86 kg (190 lb).

Gardner, a center born in Washington, D.C., was drafted in the second round by the Utah Starzz as the 27th overall pick in the 2002 WNBA draft. She had mostly a reserve role with the team, scoring a career high 14 points on 19 July 2002 against the Orlando Miracle. She then had brief stints with the San Antonio Silver Stars and the Seattle Storm before leaving the WNBA for overseas.

She currently plays in Cyprus. She had previously played for Fenerbahçe İstanbul in Turkey.

Gardner was on the women's basketball team at Howard University, where she was twice named MEAC Player Of The Year (2001 and 2002).

On April 17, 2008, Gardner returned to the WNBA when she signed the Washington Mystics.

Gardner was the assistant coach for Washington Adventist University in 2012 and then left to become the Head Women's basketball coach in the UAE for Sharjah Ladies Club for one season.

After leaving the game of basketball, Gardner made a life for herself in the human services field by working at Woodstock Job Corps.

== Career statistics ==
Legend
GP	Games played	GS	Games started	MPG	Minutes per game	RPG	Rebounds per game
APG	Assists per game	SPG	Steals per game	BPG	Blocks per game	PPG	Points per game
TO	Turnovers per game	FG%	Field-goal percentage	3P%	3-point field-goal percentage	FT%	Free-throw percentage
**Bold**	Career best	°	League leader

=== WNBA ===
==== Regular season ====
WNBA regular season statistics
Year	Team	GP	GS	MPG	FG%	3P%	FT%	RPG	APG	SPG	BPG	TO	PPG
2002	Utah	**30**	**2**	6.6	36.7	0.0	**55.3**	2.0	0.2	0.1	**0.1**	**0.4**	1.9
2003	Did not play (waived)												
2004	Did not play (waived)												
2005	Did not appear in league												
2006	Did not appear in league												
2007	Did not appear in league												
2008	Washington	22	0	**8.1**	**37.9**	0.0	54.2	**2.3**	**0.3**	0.1	0.0	0.5	**2.6**
**Career**	2 years, 2 teams	52	2	7.2	37.4	0.0	54.8	2.1	0.2	0.1	0.1	0.5	2.2

==== Playoffs ====
WNBA playoff statistics
Year	Team	GP	GS	MPG	FG%	3P%	FT%	RPG	APG	SPG	BPG	TO	PPG
2002	Utah	3	0	4.7	66.7	0.0	50.0	1.3	0.0	0.0	0.3	0.3	1.7
**Career**	1 year, 1 team	3	0	4.7	66.7	0.0	50.0	1.3	0.0	0.0	0.3	0.3	1.7

=== College ===
NCAA statistics
Year	Team	GP	Points	FG%	3P%	FT%	RPG	APG	SPG	BPG	PPG
1999–00	Howard	28	314	47.2%	0.0%	**60.1%**	11.3	0.8	1.3	1.1	11.2
2000–01	Howard	**31**	**602**	**57.7%**	0.0%	59.6%	**14.2**°	0.7	**2.1**	0.6	**19.4**
2001–02	Howard	28	437	51.2%	0.0%	57.4%	11.6	**0.9**	1.5	**1.2**	15.6
**Career**		87	1353	52.9%	0.0%	59.1%	12.4	0.8	1.6	1.0	15.6
