= Punt, Pass, and Kick =

Skills competition hosted by the National Football League

Punt, pass, and kick (PP&K) was a skills competition offered by the US National Football League (NFL) for children aged 6 to 15.

== Overview ==
PP&K began in 1961 and at one time, event highlights were shown by CBS Sports as part of its NFL coverage. The contest received renewed attention in 1995 when Kendra Wecker, a 12-year-old girl from Kansas, made the finals in her age group and competed on an equal basis with male competitors. PP&K later had separate competitions for boys and girls in five age groups.

Winners in each age group are determined by the total distance of their punts, passes, and kicks, as the name implies. The national finals competition involves one contestant from each age group sponsored by each of the NFL's 32 teams. Those contestants have already won local and sectional qualifiers to advance to that point.

The finalists are announced during a commercial break during the NFL playoffs each year.

Famous competitors include:

- Gary Carter: Major League Baseball catcher and Baseball Hall of Famer
- Todd Frazier: Major League Baseball player, winner of the national competition
- Mike Gminski: NBA center, Duke Blue Devil, from Monroe, CT winner of national competition 1971
- Pete Incaviglia: Major League Baseball player, appeared during a 1976 MNF game between the Vikings and the 49ers.
- Chad Kelly: Quarterback for the Toronto Argonauts
- Brandon Manumaleuna: Tight end for the San Diego Chargers and Saint Louis Rams
- Pat McAfee: Punter of the Indianapolis Colts, WWE analyst, and host of The Pat McAfee Show
- Chris Miller: Pro Bowl quarterback played for the Atlanta Falcons, Los Angeles/St. Louis Rams and Denver Broncos. Winner in the 1974 national competition for nine year olds.
- Andy Reid: Head coach of Kansas City Chiefs
- Herman Segelke: Chicago Cubs pitcher, winner of the 1969 national competition
- Kendra Wecker: WNBA player
- Wade Wilson: Pro Bowl quarterback and NFL coach

On May 1, 2017 the NFL announced that the Punt, Pass, and Kick competition would be terminated after 56 years. The NFL is seeking other avenues to reach youth football players (NFL FLAG).

== Scoring ==
Each contestant was allowed one punt, pass, and kick in this competition. Scoring was based on both distance and accuracy, and was also determined from where a contestant's ball first makes contact with the ground, therefore excluding any bounces or rolls to the distance. If a contestant passed their ball 100 feet (30.5 m), but it went wide of the measuring tape by 30 feet (9.1 m), their final score for passing would be 70; the score is the difference of the two measures, testing the contestant's ability to throw for distance and accuracy. The distances of the balls were measured and rounded to the nearest inch. A person could not score less than 0. A participant's final score was the total of the three events (Punt, Pass, and Kick). If, for example, a participant scored 40 for punting, 60 for passing and 22 for kicking, the participant's final score would be 122.

== Tie-breaking procedure ==
In the event of a tie for first, second, or third place at a local or sectional event, each tied participant competed in a playoff to determine the final standings. In a playoff, everyone involved competed head-to-head again in all three events. The playoff winner at a local competition advanced to the next round. The playoff winner at a sectional round advanced to the team championships. During the team championships the tie-breaker for all places would be the contestant's score in their last competition. For example, if there was a tie during the team championship, the participant's sectional round score would determine the winner.

== Eligibility ==
Participants aged from 6 to 15 were eligible, subject to providing proof of age. Both boys and girls could participate; they competed separately, and in the appropriate age group. The competition was free of charges. A child could only enter one local competition and had to submit an entry form.

The first female to compete with boys in this arena was Criss Fraser from Birmingham, Alabama. She beat all the 11-year-old boys at the local competition in Gardendale, Alabama. The Birmingham News and area North Jefferson News covered the story in their publications.
