= Kendra Wecker =

American basketball player (born 1982)

Personal information
- Born: December 16, 1982 (age 43) Marysville, Kansas, U.S.
- Listed height: 5 ft 11 in (1.80 m)
- Listed weight: 172 lb (78 kg)

Career information
- High school: Marysville (Marysville, Kansas)
- College: Kansas State (2001–2005)
- WNBA draft: 2005: 1st round, 4th overall pick
- Drafted by: San Antonio Silver Stars
- Position: Forward

Career history
- 2005–2007: San Antonio Silver Stars
- 2008: Washington Mystics

Career highlights
- Senior CLASS Award (2005); Big 12 Player of the Year (2005); All-American – USBWA (2003, 2005); First-team All-American – AP (2005); Kodak All-American (2005); 3× First-team All-Big 12 (2003–2005); 2× Third-team All-American – AP (2003, 2004); Miss Kansas Basketball (2001)
- Stats at Basketball Reference

Kendra Renee Wecker (born December 16, 1982) is an American former professional basketball player in the Women's National Basketball Association (WNBA). She formerly played forward for the San Antonio Silver Stars and Washington Mystics. In the off season, she played in the Spanish league with UB F.C Barcelona.

== Early life ==
When Wecker was 10 years old, she competed in the NFL's Punt, Pass, and Kick competition, and made the finals, playing with males on an equal basis. Wecker attended Marysville High School in Marysville, Kansas. Her team was undefeated state champions in her senior season of 2000–01. Wecker was named a WBCA All-American. She participated in the 2001 WBCA High School All-America Game, where she scored twelve points. She also participated in track and field, representing the United States internationally, winning the gold medal at the 2000 NACAC Under-25 Championships in Athletics in the javelin throw.

== College career ==
Wecker graduated from Kansas State University in 2005, where she was named Big 12 Conference Player of the Year in 2005. In 2003, 2004 and 2005 she was named to the All-Big 12 First Team. She was also named to the All-District Second Team in 2004. As a senior, Wecker was named the Lowe's Senior CLASS Award winner, recognizing her as the nation's top senior women's basketball player.

Wecker was also an All-American thrower for the Kansas State Wildcats track and field team, placing 6th in the javelin throw at the 2002 NCAA Division I Outdoor Track and Field Championships.

== Professional career ==
Wecker was drafted 4th overall by the San Antonio Silver Stars in the 1st round of the 2005 WNBA draft. In her first game of her rookie year, she tore her ACL and was out the rest of the season.

On February 19, 2006, during the WNBA offseason, Wecker joined Tony Parker and Steve Kerr in the NBA RadioShack Shooting Stars contest. She helped achieve the NBA Shooting Stars record time of 25.1 seconds.

On May 13, 2008, she was waived by the San Antonio Silver Stars. On June 23, 2008, Wecker was signed by the Washington Mystics. On August 12, 2008, Wecker was waived by the Mystics.

== Career statistics ==
Legend
GP	Games played	GS	Games started	MPG	Minutes per game	RPG	Rebounds per game
APG	Assists per game	SPG	Steals per game	BPG	Blocks per game	PPG	Points per game
TO	Turnovers per game	FG%	Field-goal percentage	3P%	3-point field-goal percentage	FT%	Free-throw percentage
**Bold**	Career best	°	League leader

=== WNBA ===
==== Regular season ====
WNBA regular season statistics
Year	Team	GP	GS	MPG	FG%	3P%	FT%	RPG	APG	SPG	BPG	TO	PPG
2005	San Antonio	1	0	11.0	33.3	0.0	0.0	—	**2.0**	**1.0**	0.0	1.0	4.0
2006	San Antonio	**34**	**11**	**17.0**	**35.0**	**33.9**	**77.8**	**2.5**	1.4	0.3	**0.1**	0.9	**5.6**
2007	San Antonio	14	1	5.2	30.0	0.0	66.7	0.6	0.3	0.2	**0.1**	**0.2**	1.1
2008	Washington	9	0	5.3	11.8	14.3	—	1.2	0.8	0.3	0.0	0.8	0.6
**Career**	4 years, 2 teams	58	12	12.2	33.1	28.6	75.8	1.8	1.0	0.3	0.1	0.7	3.7

==== Playoffs ====
WNBA playoff statistics
Year	Team	GP	GS	MPG	FG%	3P%	FT%	RPG	APG	SPG	BPG	TO	PPG
2007	San Antonio	2	0	2.5	100.0	—	100.0	0.5	0.0	0.5	0.0	1.0	1.5
**Career**	1 year, 1 teams	2	0	2.5	100.0	—	100.0	0.5	0.0	0.5	0.0	1.0	1.5

=== College ===
NCAA statistics
Year	Team	GP	Points	FG%	3P%	FT%	RPG	APG	SPG	BPG	PPG
2001–02	Kansas State	**34**	557	**52.9**	37.2	85.1	7.8	2.9	1.8	0.6	16.4
2002–03	Kansas State	**34**	**646**	46.6	38.6	86.4	8.3	**3.7**	1.8	0.3	19.0
2003–04	Kansas State	31	521	49.3	**42.4**	**89.4**	8.1	2.7	**1.9**	0.7	16.8
2004–05	Kansas State	29	609	47.6	42.1	85.6	**10.1**	2.6	1.6	0.7	**21.0**°
**Career**		128	2333	48.9	39.8	86.4	8.5	3.0	1.8	0.6	18.2
