= Kyle Wilson (linebacker) =

American gridiron football player (born 1995)

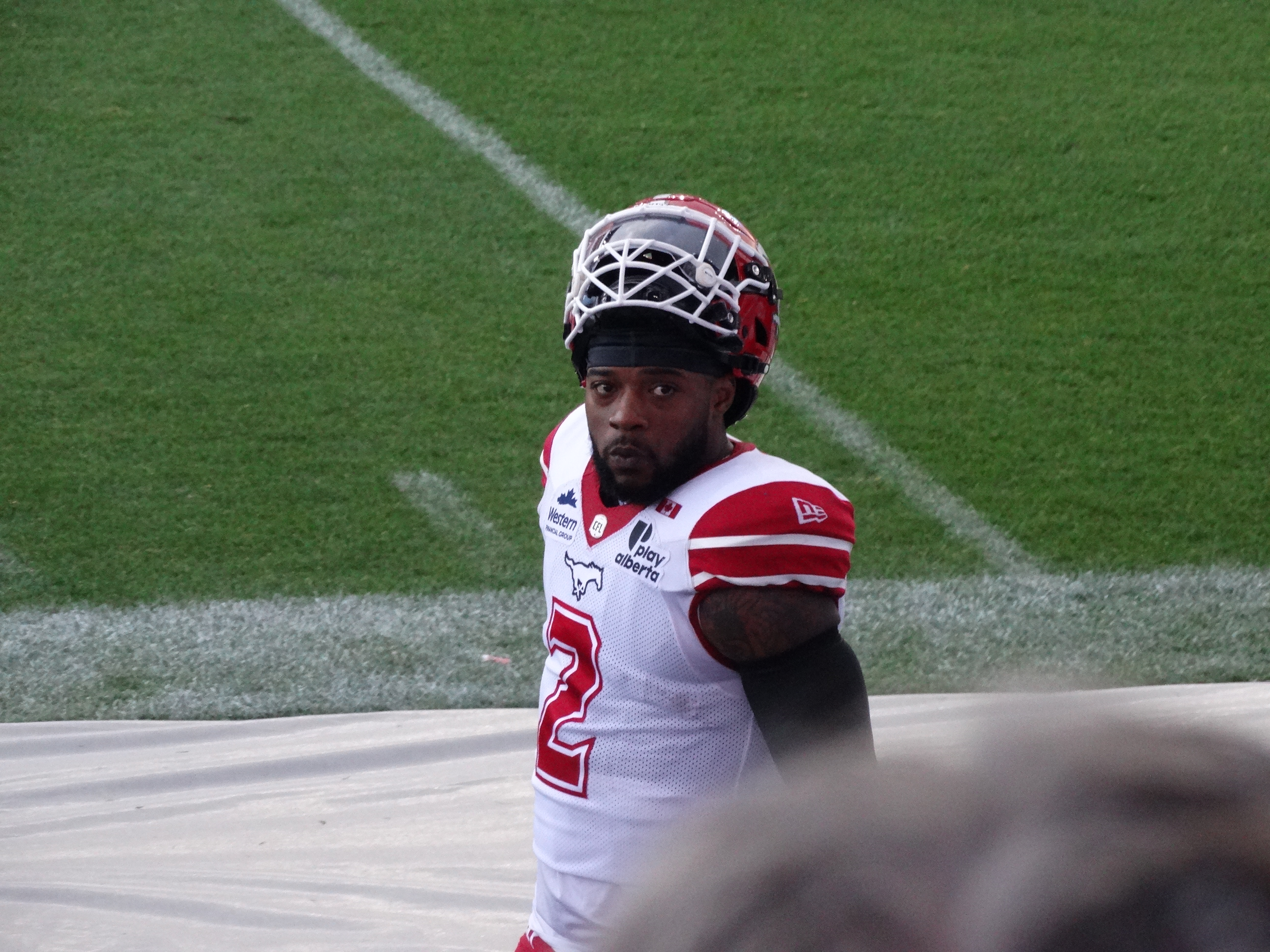
- Wilson with the Calgary Stampeders in 2026

No. 2 – Calgary Stampeders
- Position: Linebacker
- Roster status: Active
- CFL status: American

Personal information
- Born: November 2, 1995 (age 31); Wichita, Kansas, U.S.
- Listed height: 6 ft 0 in (1.83 m)
- Listed weight: 230 lb (104 kg)

Career information
- High school: Wichita South
- College: Arkansas State
- NFL draft: 2018: undrafted

Career history
- Philadelphia Eagles (2018)*; Los Angeles Chargers (2018); Hamilton Tiger-Cats (2020–2025); Calgary Stampeders (2025–present)
- * Offseason or practice squad member only

Career NFL statistics
- Total tackles: 2
- Stats at Pro Football Reference

Career CFL statistics as of 2026
- Total tackles: 268
- Sacks: 2
- Forced fumbles: 6
- Interceptions: 2
- Stats at CFL.ca

Kyle V. Wilson (born November 2, 1995) is an American professional football linebacker for the Calgary Stampeders of the Canadian Football League (CFL). He played college football at Arkansas State.

== Professional career ==
Pre-draft measurables
Height	Weight	Arm length	Hand span	Wingspan	40-yard dash	10-yard split	20-yard split	20-yard shuttle	Three-cone drill	Vertical jump	Broad jump	Bench press
5 ft 10 1/2 in (1.79 m)	229 lb (104 kg)	31 1/2 in (0.80 m)	9 in (0.23 m)	6 ft 2 1/8 in (1.88 m)	4.63 s	1.63 s	2.65 s	4.75 s	7.72 s	29.5 in (0.75 m)	9 ft 1 in (2.77 m)	25 reps
All values from Pro Day

=== Philadelphia Eagles ===
After going undrafted in the 2018 NFL draft, he was signed by the Philadelphia Eagles as an undrafted free agent. He was released during the final roster cutdown on September 1, 2018. He was re-signed to the Eagles practice squad on October 2, 2018. He was released on October 16, 2018.

=== Los Angeles Chargers ===
On November 7, 2018, Wilson was signed to the Los Angeles Chargers practice squad. He was promoted to the Chargers active roster on December 13, 2018. He was released on August 31, 2019.

=== Hamilton Tiger-Cats ===
Wilson signed with the Hamilton Tiger-Cats of the CFL on May 6, 2020. After the CFL canceled the 2020 season due to the COVID-19 pandemic, Wilson chose to opt-out of his contract with the Tiger-Cats on August 25, 2020. He opted back in to his contract on December 21, 2020. In 2022, Wilson made 10 starts for the Tiger-Cats, recording 42 defensive tackles, three special teams tackles, five tackles for a loss, one forced fumble and one pass knockdown. In November 2022, Wilson signed a two-year extension with the Tiger-Cats.

Following an injury-shortened 2023 season, Wilson recorded 88 defensive tackles, 1 interception, 2 sacks and a forced fumble in 2024. He played in the first two games in 2025, but was released on June 25, 2025.

=== Calgary Stampeders ===
On June 26, 2025, it was announced that Wilson had signed with the Calgary Stampeders. He played in 14 regular season games where he recorded 56 defensive tackles, six special teams tackles, and one forced fumble. He changed his jersey number from 31 to 2 in the following offseason.
