= Desmond Purnell =

American football player (born 2003)

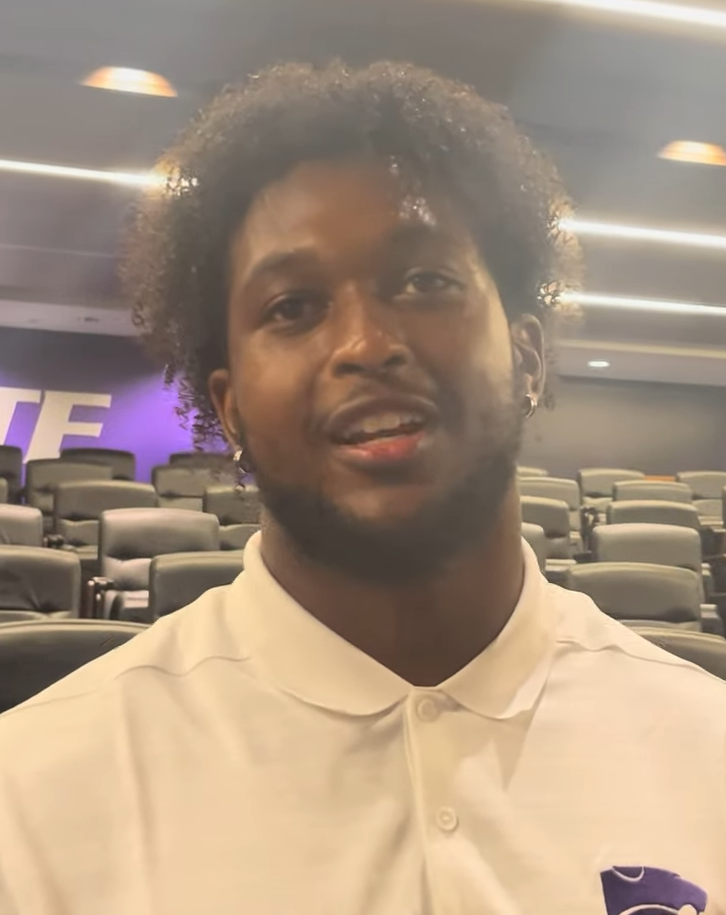
- Purnell with the Kansas State Wildcats in 2024

No. 32 – Kansas State Wildcats
- Position: Linebacker
- Class: Redshirt Senior

Personal information
- Born: January 29, 2003 (age 23); Fort Riley, Kansas, U.S.
- Listed height: 5 ft 11 in (1.80 m)
- Listed weight: 228 lb (103 kg)

Career information
- High school: Hayden (Topeka, Kansas)
- College: Kansas State (2021–2025)
- Stats at ESPN

Desmond Purnell (born January 29, 2003) is an American football linebacker for the Kansas State Wildcats.

== Early life ==
Purnell attended high school at Hayden High School located in Topeka, Kansas, where he was a four-year varsity player. Coming out of high school, he committed to play college football for the Kansas State Wildcats.

== College career ==
During his first collegiate season in 2021, Purnell used the season to redshirt. In week seven of the 2022 season, he entered the game for an injured Khalid Duke, where he finished with three tackles and two pass deflections in a win over Iowa State. Purnell finished the 2022 season, totaling 21 tackles, two pass deflections, and a fumble recovery. In the 2023 season, he made 13 starts, where he notched 52 tackles, an interception, three forced fumbles, two fumble recoveries, and a touchdown. Purnell finished the 2024 season playing in all 13 games with 12 starts, racking up 46 tackles with nine and a half being for a loss and four sacks. He entered the 2025 season as one of the Wildcats top players and leaders, as he was selected to attend the Big 12 media days. In week seven of the 2025 season, he tallied five tackles with two going for a loss, a sack, and two interceptions, one of which he returned 25 yards for a touchdown in a victory over TCU.

== Professional career ==
Pre-draft measurables
| Height | Weight | Arm length | Hand span | Wingspan |
|---|---|---|---|---|
| 5 ft 11 in (1.80 m) | 228 lb (103 kg) | 31 in (0.79 m) | 9 3/8 in (0.24 m) | 6 ft 2 in (1.88 m) |
All values from Pro Day
