= Lawrence Pete =

American football player (born 1966)

No. 96
- Position: Nose tackle

Personal information
- Born: January 18, 1966 (age 60); Wichita, Kansas, U.S.
- Listed height: 6 ft 0 in (1.83 m)
- Listed weight: 286 lb (130 kg)

Career information
- High school: Wichita South
- College: Nebraska
- NFL draft: 1989: 5th round, 115th overall pick

Career history
- Detroit Lions (1989–1993)

Awards and highlights
- First-team All-Big Eight (1988) ( First Team 1988 All American Strength Team

Career NFL statistics
- Fumble recoveries: 3
- Sacks: 3.5
- Stats at Pro Football Reference

Lawrence Pete (born January 18, 1966) is an American former professional football player who was a nose tackle for five seasons with the Detroit Lions of the National Football League (NFL). He played college football for the Nebraska Cornhuskers and was selected by the Lions in the fifth round of the 1989 NFL draft with the 115th overall pick. He retired after the 1993 season and finished his career with 3.5 sacks, three fumble recoveries, and 61 games played with 19 starts.

He attended Wichita South High School.

His nephews Arthur and Bryce Brown were amongst the best high school football prospects in the United States.

Lawrence Pete played nose tackle for the University of Nebraska from 1986 to 1988.
