= Tanner Hawkinson =

American football player (born 1990)

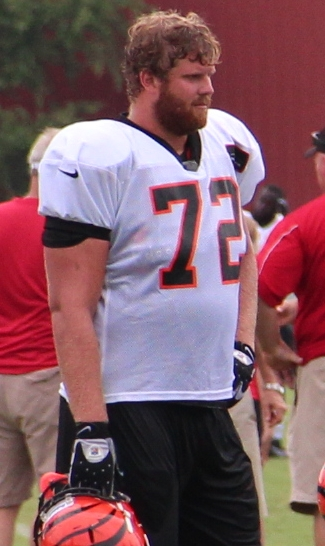
- Hawkinson with the Cincinnati Bengals in 2013

No. 72
- Position: Offensive tackle

Personal information
- Born: May 14, 1990 (age 36); McPherson, Kansas, U.S.
- Listed height: 6 ft 5 in (1.96 m)
- Listed weight: 298 lb (135 kg)

Career information
- High school: McPherson
- College: Kansas
- NFL draft: 2013: 5th round, 156th overall pick

Career history
- Cincinnati Bengals (2013–2014); San Francisco 49ers (2015)*; Philadelphia Eagles (2015); Jacksonville Jaguars (2016)*
- * Offseason or practice squad member only

Awards and highlights
- Second-team All-Big 12 (2012)

Career NFL statistics
- Games played: 4
- Stats at Pro Football Reference

Tanner Hawkinson (born May 14, 1990) is an American former professional football player who was an offensive tackle in the National Football League (NFL). Hawkinson played college football for the Kansas Jayhawks. He was selected by the Cincinnati Bengals in the fifth round of the 2013 NFL draft.

== Early life ==
Hawkinson was an all-state defensive lineman and tight end at McPherson High School in McPherson, Kansas, graduating in 2008.

Hawkinson is related to retired basketball player Ava Jones.

== College career ==
He was recruited to the University of Kansas to play tight end, but moved to defense, and eventually ended up on the offensive line. He was a freshman All-American in 2009 at tackle for the Jayhawks, protecting Todd Reesing's blind side. Hawkinson was also a second-team All-Big-12 player as a senior in 2012. He had three coaches in his five years at KU in Mark Mangino, Turner Gill, and Charlie Weis.

== Professional career ==
He was selected in the fifth round, 156th overall in the 2013 NFL draft. Hawkinson was waived by Cincinnati as part of the final 53-man roster cuts on September 5, 2015.

On September 7, 2015, Hawkinson was signed to the San Francisco 49ers practice squad.

On April 4, 2016 Hawkinson was claimed off waivers by the Jacksonville Jaguars after having spent the 2015 season with the Philadelphia Eagles.

Hawkinson announced his retirement from the NFL at the age of 25 on April 15, 2016.
