= Davontae Harris =

American football player (born 1995)

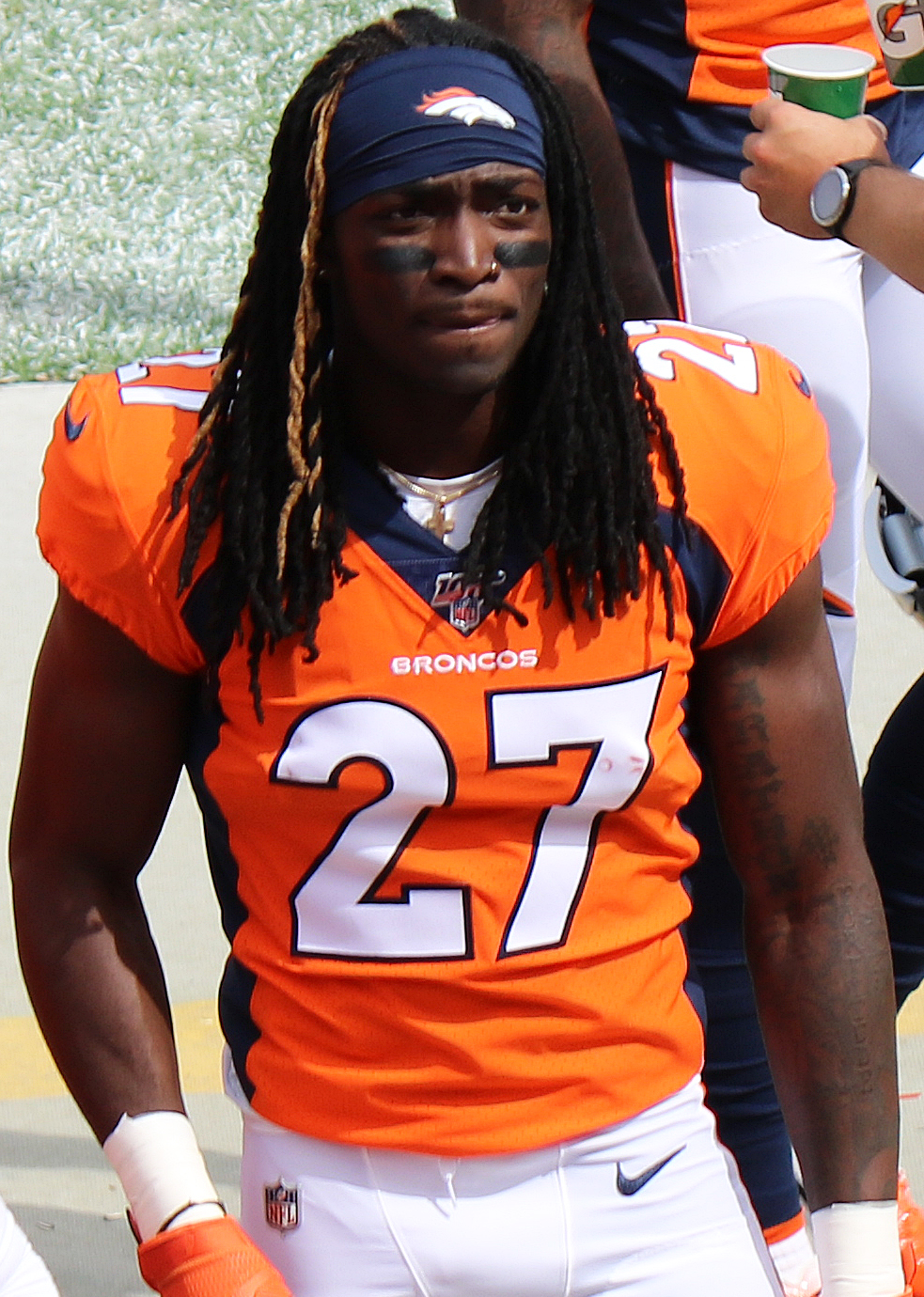
- Harris with the Denver Broncos in 2019

No. 35, 27, 33, 28, 26, 40, 38
- Position: Cornerback

Personal information
- Born: January 21, 1995 (age 31); Wichita, Kansas, U.S.
- Listed height: 5 ft 11 in (1.80 m)
- Listed weight: 200 lb (91 kg)

Career information
- High school: Wichita South
- College: Illinois State
- NFL draft: 2018: 5th round, 151st overall pick

Career history
- Cincinnati Bengals (2018); Denver Broncos (2019–2020); Baltimore Ravens (2020); San Francisco 49ers (2021); Los Angeles Chargers (2021); Chicago Bears (2022)*; Tennessee Titans (2022)
- * Offseason or practice squad member only

Awards and highlights
- 2× First-team All-MVFC (2016, 2017)

Career NFL statistics
- Total tackles: 59
- Forced fumbles: 1
- Pass deflections: 4
- Stats at Pro Football Reference

Davontae Harris (born January 21, 1995) is an American former professional football player who was a cornerback in the National Football League (NFL). He attended high school at Wichita South High School in Wichita, Kansas. He played college football for the Illinois State Redbirds.

== Professional career ==
Pre-draft measurables
Height	Weight	Arm length	Hand span	40-yard dash	20-yard shuttle	Three-cone drill	Vertical jump	Broad jump	Bench press
5 ft 11 3/8 in (1.81 m)	205 lb (93 kg)	31 1/8 in (0.79 m)	8 3/4 in (0.22 m)	4.43 s	4.40 s	6.96 s	33.5 in (0.85 m)	10 ft 3 in (3.12 m)	22 reps
All values from NFL Combine

=== Cincinnati Bengals ===
Harris was selected by the Cincinnati Bengals in the fifth round, 151st overall, of the 2018 NFL draft. He was placed on injured reserve on September 3, 2018 with a knee injury. He was activated off injured reserve on December 5.

Harris was waived during final roster cuts on August 31, 2019.

=== Denver Broncos ===
Harris was signed by the Denver Broncos on September 2, 2019. He played in all 16 games with six starts in 2019, recording 35 tackles and three pass deflections.

Harris entered the 2020 season as the fourth cornerback on the Broncos depth chart. On November 17, 2020, Harris was waived by the Broncos.

=== Baltimore Ravens ===
On November 18, 2020, Harris was claimed off waivers by the Baltimore Ravens. After playing in Week 12 against the Pittsburgh Steelers, he started the next week against the Dallas Cowboys, although he only played 15% of the defensive snaps during the game. In Week 14 against the Cleveland Browns, Harris was put in the game following rib and shoulder injuries to Jimmy Smith before an ankle injury of his own late in the fourth quarter took him out. On December 21, Harris was placed on injured reserve. He was designated to return from injured reserve on January 12, 2021, and began practicing with the team again, but was not activated before the end of the Ravens' postseason. He was waived on January 18, and re-signed with the team on February 8. He was waived again on August 16.

=== San Francisco 49ers ===
On August 17, 2021, Harris was claimed off waivers by the San Francisco 49ers. He was placed on injured reserve on September 1. He was activated on October 11, then released the next day. He was re-signed to the practice squad on October 14.

=== Los Angeles Chargers ===
On November 30, 2021, Harris was signed by the Los Angeles Chargers off the 49ers' practice squad.

=== Chicago Bears ===
On August 5, 2022, Harris signed with the Chicago Bears. He was released on August 30 and signed to the practice squad the next day. He was released on November 12.

=== Tennessee Titans ===
On November 15, 2022, Harris was signed to the Tennessee Titans' practice squad. He was promoted to the active roster on December 17.

== Charity work ==
Shortly after signing his rookie contract, Harris began giving back to his hometown of Wichita, Kansas. He donated school supplies to the Wichita Children's home and announced he was also taking donations.
