= Steve Henson =

American basketball player and coach (born 1968)

Southeastern CC Blackhawks
- Title: Head coach
- League: ICCAC

Personal information
- Born: February 2, 1968 (age 58) Junction City, Kansas, U.S.
- Listed height: 5 ft 11 in (1.80 m)
- Listed weight: 177 lb (80 kg)

Career information
- High school: McPherson (McPherson, Kansas)
- College: Kansas State (1986–1990)
- NBA draft: 1990: 2nd round, 44th overall pick
- Drafted by: Milwaukee Bucks
- Playing career: 1990–1999
- Position: Point guard
- Number: 12
- Coaching career: 1999–present

Career history

Playing
- 1990–1992: Milwaukee Bucks
- 1992: La Crosse Catbirds
- 1992–1993: Atlanta Hawks
- 1993: Charlotte Hornets
- 1993–1994: Rapid City Thrillers
- 1994: Fargo-Moorhead Fever / Mexico Aztecas
- 1994–1995: Portland Trail Blazers
- 1995–1997: Virtus Roma
- 1997–1998: Grand Rapids Hoops
- 1998: Detroit Pistons
- 1998–1999: Panionios
- 1999: Detroit Pistons
- 1999: Scavolini Pesaro

Coaching
- 1999–2000: Illinois (assistant)
- 2001–2002: Atlanta Hawks (advance scout)
- 2002–2003: Atlanta Hawks (assistant)
- 2003–2004: South Florida (assistant)
- 2004–2011: UNLV (assistant)
- 2011–2016: Oklahoma (assistant)
- 2016–2024: UTSA
- 2024–2026: Baylor (assistant)
- 2026-present: Southeastern CC

Career highlights
- As player: First-team All-Big Eight (1989); Mr. Kansas Basketball (1986); As coach: C-USA Coach of the Year (2018)

Career NBA statistics
- Points: 739 (3.1 ppg)
- Assists: 465 (2.0 apg)
- Rebounds: 176 (0.7 rpg)
- Stats at NBA.com
- Stats at Basketball Reference

Steven Michael Henson (born February 2, 1968) is an American basketball coach and former professional basketball player who is an assistant for Baylor University. He previously served as the head coach at the University of Texas at San Antonio (UTSA). He was selected by the Milwaukee Bucks in the second round (44th pick overall) of the 1990 NBA draft. He was an assistant basketball coach at the University of Oklahoma under his former college coach Lon Kruger.

== College career ==
Henson played collegiately at Kansas State University, where he was named to the All-Big Eight Conference first team in 1989. He is Kansas State's all-time leader in assists, and remains in the top ten on the all-time NCAA career free throw percentage list, with a .900 mark. He was also a track and field decathlete at Kansas State.

While at Kansas State, he was initiated into the Tau Kappa Epsilon (TKE) fraternity and was an active member in the chapter.

== Professional career ==
In six seasons in the NBA, Henson played for the Bucks, Atlanta Hawks, Charlotte Hornets, Portland Trail Blazers, and Detroit Pistons. During his NBA career, Henson appeared in 238 games and averaged 3.1 points per game.

== NBA career statistics ==
Legend
GP	Games played	GS	Games started	MPG	Minutes per game
FG%	Field goal percentage	3P%	3-point field goal percentage	FT%	Free throw percentage
RPG	Rebounds per game	APG	Assists per game	SPG	Steals per game
BPG	Blocks per game	PPG	Points per game	**Bold**	Career high

=== Regular season ===
Year	Team	GP	GS	MPG	FG%	3P%	FT%	RPG	APG	SPG	BPG	PPG
1990–91	Milwaukee	**68**	0	10.1	.418	.333	.905	0.8	1.9	0.5	0.0	3.1
1991–92	Milwaukee	50	1	7.7	.361	.479	.793	0.8	1.6	0.3	0.0	3.0
1992–93	Atlanta	53	**2**	**13.6**	.390	.463	.850	**1.0**	**2.9**	**0.6**	0.0	**4.0**
1993–94	Charlotte	3	0	5.7	**.500**	**1.000**	.000	0.3	1.7	0.0	0.0	1.0
1994–95	Portland	37	0	10.3	.430	.442	.880	0.7	2.3	0.2	0.0	3.2
1997–98	Detroit	23	0	2.8	**.500**	.375	**1.000**	0.1	0.2	0.0	0.0	1.6
1998–99	Detroit	4	0	6.3	**.500**	.000	**1.000**	0.0	0.8	0.3	0.0	1.0
Career		238	3	9.6	.403	.432	.869	0.7	2.0	0.4	0.0	3.1

=== Playoffs ===
Year	Team	GP	GS	MPG	FG%	3P%	FT%	RPG	APG	SPG	BPG	PPG
1990–91	Milwaukee	**3**	0	13.3	**.500**	**.667**	**.750**	1.0	1.0	0.3	0.0	**5.7**
1992–93	Atlanta	**3**	0	**15.7**	.333	.400	.000	**1.3**	**1.7**	**1.3**	0.0	2.7
Career		6	0	14.5	.429	.500	.750	1.2	1.3	0.8	0.0	4.2

== Coaching career ==
Since retiring from playing basketball, Henson has turned to coaching. He has been an assistant at Illinois, with the Atlanta Hawks, at South Florida, at UNLV and at Oklahoma. After a successful 2015–16 season with the Oklahoma Sooners to the 2016 Final Four in Houston, Henson was announced to succeed Brooks Thompson as the new head coach for UTSA.

=== UTSA (2016–2024) ===
On April 1, 2016, Henson was hired as the head coach at the University of Texas at San Antonio (UTSA) and assumed his new position after the Sooners' exit from the NCAA tournament the following day.

In his first year of coaching, Henson engaged in a major rebuilding effort after succeeding Thompson as head coach. In his first year, UTSA posted a nine-win improvement in the overall record, going to 14–19 and a five-win improvement in Conference USA (C-USA) games to 8–10.

In his second season, Henson posted a winning record for the first time since 2011–12, going 20–15 for the season and 11–7 in conference play, and being named the conference coach of the year. The UTSA Roadrunners lost in the quarterfinals of the 2018 C-USA tournament, but secured an invite into the 2018 CIT tournament.

After three straight seasons with 20 or more losses, Henson was fired from UTSA on March 14, 2024.

=== Baylor (2024-2026) ===
Following his firing as head coach at UTSA, Henson was hired as an assistant in Scott Drew's staff at Baylor University on May 7, 2024.

In his two seasons at Baylor, the beats made the NCAA Tournament for the sixth consecutive season in 2025, before missing the tournament in 2026 after a .500 season.

=== Southeastern Community College (2026-Present) ===
On June 26, 2026, Henson was named the head coach at Southeastern Community College, two weeks after the resignation of previous coach Lorenzo Watkins, following a 17-13 season. He officially took over on July 1.

== Head coaching record ==
=== College ===
Record table
Season	Team	Overall	Conference	Standing	Postseason
UTSA Roadrunners (Conference USA) (2016–2023)
2016–17	UTSA	14–19	8–10	9th	
2017–18	UTSA	20–15	11–7	5th	CIT quarterfinals
2018–19	UTSA	17–15	11–7	T–2nd	
2019–20	UTSA	13–19	7–11	10th	
2020–21	UTSA	15–11	9–7	4th (West)	
2021–22	UTSA	10–22	3–15	6th (West)	
2022–23	UTSA	10–21	4–16	11th	
2023–24	UTSA	11–21	5–13	T–10th	
Southeastern Community College (Iowa Community College Athletic Conference) (2026–Present)
2026-27	SCC	-	-	-	-
UTSA:		110–144 (.433)	54–72 (.429)		
SCC:		1–1 (.500)	0–0 (–)		
Total:		110–144 (.433)			
National champion Postseason invitational champion Conference regular season champion Conference regular season and conference tournament champion Division regular season champion Division regular season and conference tournament champion Conference tournament champion
