= Bryce Brown =

American football player (born 1991)

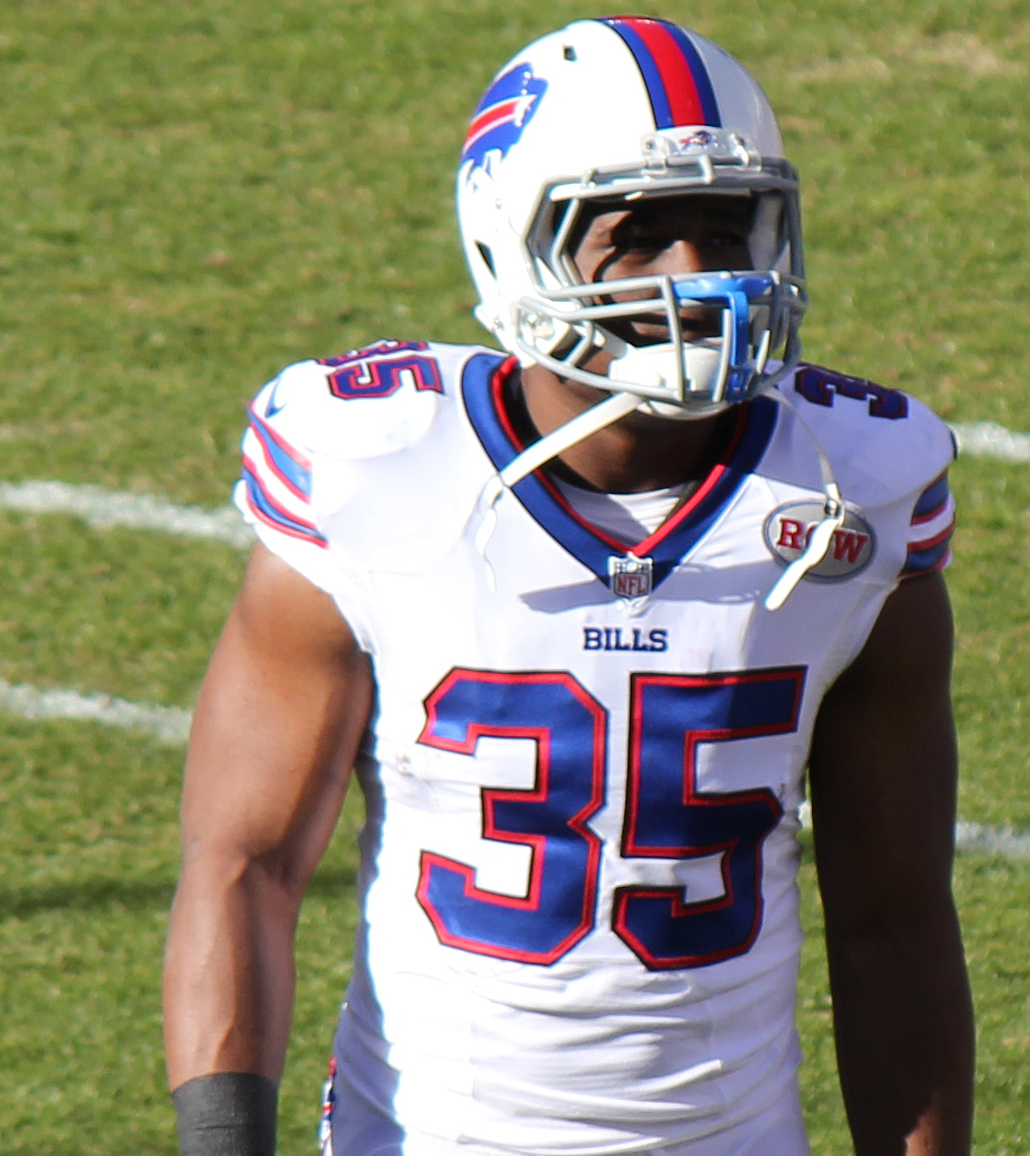
- Brown with the Buffalo Bills in 2014

No. 34, 35, 36
- Position: Running back

Personal information
- Born: May 14, 1991 (age 35); Wichita, Kansas, U.S.
- Listed height: 6 ft 0 in (1.83 m)
- Listed weight: 223 lb (101 kg)

Career information
- High school: Wichita East
- College: Tennessee (2009); Kansas State (2011)
- NFL draft: 2012: 7th round, 229th overall pick

Career history
- Philadelphia Eagles (2012–2013); Buffalo Bills (2014–2015); Seattle Seahawks (2015)

Career NFL statistics
- Rushing attempts: 251
- Rushing yards: 1,076
- Rushing touchdowns: 7
- Receptions: 37
- Receiving yards: 316
- Stats at Pro Football Reference

Bryce Lee Brown (born May 14, 1991) is an American former professional football player who was a running back for the Philadelphia Eagles, Buffalo Bills, and Seattle Seahawks of the National Football League (NFL). He played college football for the Tennessee Volunteers as a freshman before transferring to the Kansas State Wildcats after head coach Lane Kiffin left Tennessee for USC. Later that year, Volunteers coach Derek Dooley declined to release Brown from his scholarship, resulting in Brown sitting out the 2010 season at Kansas State due to NCAA transfer rules. Brown left the Kansas State football team early in the 2011 season to enter the 2012 NFL draft. In April 2012, Brown was selected in the seventh round by the Philadelphia Eagles.

While playing at Wichita East High School, he won the 2008 Hall Trophy for the best high school player in the United States and was ranked atop of the Rivals.com ranking of his class, the first running back to do so since Adrian Peterson in 2004. In 2008, he was also dubbed the best high school running back prospect of the last five years. In 2008, Rivals.com analyst Barry Every compared Brown to NFL running back Ronnie Brown.

== Early life ==
A first-team All-City league selection as a freshman, he rushed for 1,472 yards and 12 touchdowns. He followed that up with an even more impressive sophomore campaign, rushing for 2,039 yards and 26 TDs. Brown was a consensus First-team All-State selection as well as EA Sports National Sophomore of the Year. He amassed more than 50 scholarship offers.

During his junior year, Brown rushed for 1,825 yards on 207 carries (8.8 avg) and 23 touchdowns, earning him All-City and All-State honors. He wore #5 in his Junior year. He was also recognized as a member of the Kansas “Fab 11” and was the lone junior that was named a USA Today Prep All-American. In fact, Tom Lemming of CSTV considered Brown to be better than all of the senior running backs in the 2008 class (which included Darrell Scott, Ryan Williams, and Cyrus Gray). Brown was believed to be the top running back prospect from Kansas since Barry Sanders.

Arthur Brown committed to the University of Miami in December 2007, which led to rumors whether Bryce may complete his high school in Coral Gables, Florida, since their mother once told USA Today that Bryce “is wanting to go to high school wherever Arthur chooses to go to college.” Bryce Brown, however, eventually decided to remain in Wichita for his senior season.

In October 2008, Brown was selected to the 2009 U.S. Army All-American Bowl. Brown finished the 2008 season with a Wichita City League regular-season record 1,873 yards rushing, giving him 7,209 rushing yards overall, also a City League record. He was named to the USA Today All-USA First-team for the second consecutive time.

=== Recruiting ===
His workouts, recruiting, and news media requests were handled by Brian Butler, who identified himself as Brown's trainer and handler. Butler sold updates of Brown's recruitment via website for $9.99 a month or $59 a year and sought contributions that he says were used to take players on a tour of colleges each summer. At one point, Butler announced Brown was considering entering the Canadian Football League (CFL), but Brown backed down from that claim. As a result of Butler's handling, the National Collegiate Athletic Association’s amateurism certification staff launched an investigation to determine whether anything had been done that would jeopardize Brown's amateur status. The NCAA's investigation eventually cleared Brown to play before the start of his freshman season.

On February 22, 2008, Brown chose to follow his brother and verbally committed to the University of Miami. However, Brown did not sign a letter of intent on National Signing Day 2009, but instead planned to announce his decision on March 16, naming five other "finalists" despite his oral commitment to Miami: LSU, Tennessee, Oregon, USC, and Kansas State. Said ESPN.com′s Tom Luginbill: "If I was Randy Shannon and the Miami staff, I would tell the kid and Brian Butler to go jump in a lake. I got to imagine that deep down, Miami's coaches have to be thinking, 'This is getting ridiculous.'" Prior to his announcement, Brown paid official visits to Oregon and Clemson, and finally took an impromptu visit to Tennessee on March 13.

Citing an anonymous source, the Associated Press reported the University of Miami would not reissue a national letter of intent to Brown to replace the one that expired Wednesday, February 18. Brown's advisor Brian Butler told AP he was unaware scholarship offers have an expiration date, but reiterated that Brown would not sign until March 16. According to Palm Beach Post′s Jorge Milian UM coach Shannon called Brown on Tuesday, February 17, and allegedly told him the University of Miami was no longer interested in his services. However, Brown later told Wichita Eagle that Shannon still wanted him to be a Hurricane. Due to NCAA rules, Shannon was not allowed to comment.

On March 16, 2009, Brown announced at a press conference at the Kansas Sports Hall of Fame in Wichita, Kansas, that he would attend the University of Tennessee. "I feel that's the school that's gonna prepare me the best to go to the next level," Brown said at the press conference.

== College career ==
Entering college with an enormous amount of hype, Brown was expected to see considerable playing time during his true freshman year and spent the 2009 season in the top two running back rotation. His amateur status was under investigation by the NCAA prior to the season, but Brown was cleared only a few days later.

Brown spent the season as a backup to senior Montario Hardesty. Brown finished the season with 460 yards rushing, second on the team behind Hardesty. He also had three rushing touchdowns.

On the first day of Tennessee's 2010 spring practice, after Lane Kiffin left the Volunteers for USC, Brown announced his decision to leave the program. Volunteers' coach Derek Dooley said that Brown would remain enrolled at Tennessee for the rest of the spring semester but did not indicate if he would then transfer. His brother Arthur transferred from the University of Miami to Kansas State University a couple of weeks earlier, and on August 15, 2010, Brown decided to join his brother at Kansas State.

Brown, along with his brother Arthur, were named in a report from Yahoo! Sports alleging that student-athletes, coaches, and administrators were aware and received impermissible benefits from an ex-booster of the University of Miami Nevin Shapiro. "Kansas State University has been in communication with the NCAA," the university said in a release. "Regarding Arthur Brown and Bryce Brown, the NCAA staff has informed the institution that it has no concerns about their eligibility to compete at K-State."

In Brown's only action for the Wildcats, he carried the ball three times for 16 yards as a fourth-option back in a 10–7 win over Eastern Kentucky On September 3. On September 29, 2011, it was reported that Brown left the Kansas State football team "at least temporarily." He entered the 2012 NFL draft as an early entry in January 2012.

== Professional career ==
=== Pre-draft ===
Brown was not invited to the 2012 NFL Combine. Dan Pompei of the Chicago Tribune ranked him as the No. 17 running back prospect of the 2012 NFL draft.

Pre-draft measurables
Height	Weight	40-yard dash	10-yard split	20-yard split	20-yard shuttle	Three-cone drill	Vertical jump	Broad jump	Bench press
5 ft 11 1/2 in (1.82 m)	223 lb (101 kg)	4.48 s	1.56 s	2.58 s	4.20 s	7.04 s	34.0 in (0.86 m)	9 ft 9 in (2.97 m)	22 reps
All values from Kansas State Pro Day

=== Philadelphia Eagles ===
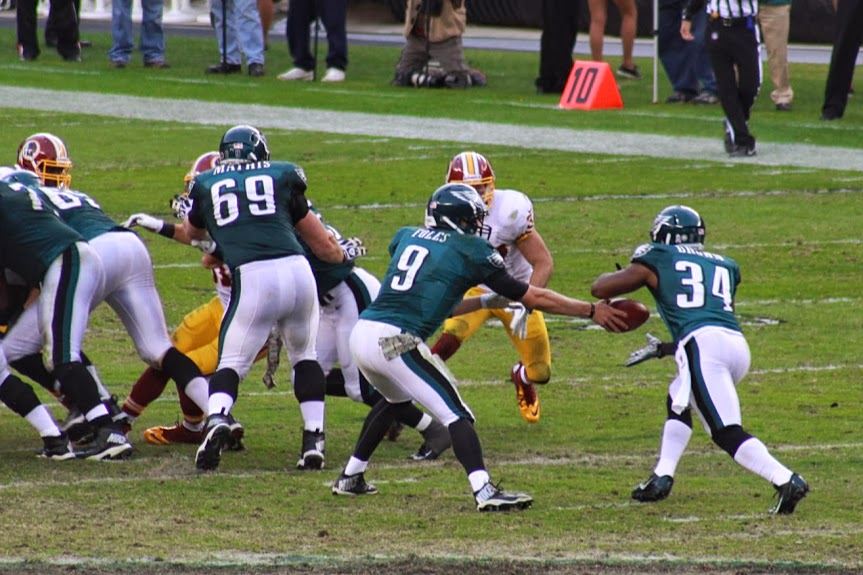
Bryce Brown takes a handoff from Philadelphia Eagles quarterback Nick Foles.

Brown was selected in the seventh round (229th overall) of the 2012 NFL draft by the Philadelphia Eagles. He signed a four-year contract with the team on May 11, 2012.

After starting running back LeSean McCoy was ruled out due to post-concussion symptoms, Brown started against the Carolina Panthers on Monday Night Football on November 26, 2012—his first start since high school. Brown had over 100 yards and a touchdown in the first half alone, including a sixty-five yard touchdown run. He finished the game with 178 yards rushing on 19 carries, 2 touchdowns and 4 receptions for 11 yards, and 2 fumbles. Brown's 178 yards set an Eagles rookie record. The next week on December 2, 2012, against the Dallas Cowboys, Brown rushed for 169 yards and two touchdowns. Brown fumbled late in the fourth quarter, however, and Dallas player Morris Claiborne returned the fumble 50 yards for the deciding score in the game.

In the 2013 season, Brown continued to play backup. In a 54–11 blowout of the Chicago Bears, he reached 115 yards on only nine carries, including a 65-yard touchdown. The 9.6 yards per snap (only on the field for 12 snaps) average was the NFL record since the stat became available in 2012 (later broken by Miami's Lamar Miller in 2015).

=== Buffalo Bills ===
On May 10, 2014, Brown was traded to the Buffalo Bills. The trade sent Brown and the Eagles 2014 7th round pick for the Bills 2015 4th round pick and 2014 7th round pick. On September 15, 2015, the Bills released Brown.

=== Seattle Seahawks ===
On October 27, 2015, Brown signed with the Seattle Seahawks. He spent the remainder of the 2015 season with the team.

== NFL career statistics ==
Year	Team	Games		Rushing					Receiving					Fumbles	
Year	Team	GP	GS	Att	Yds	Avg	TD	Lng	Rec	Yds	Avg	TD	Lng	Fum	Lost
2012	PHI	16	4	115	564	4.9	4	65	13	56	4.3	0	11	4	3
2013	PHI	16	1	75	314	4.2	2	65	8	84	10.5	0	35	0	0
2014	BUF	7	2	36	126	3.5	0	14	16	176	11.0	0	40	1	1
2015	SEA	3	0	26	72	2.8	1	18	0	0	0	0	0	0	0
Career		42	7	252	1,076	4.3	7	65	37	316	8.5	0	40	5	4

== Personal life ==
Bryce met his wife, Morgan, at The University of Tennessee. The two married on March 8, 2013, in Fiji. The couple has two sons together, Beckham and Leighton Brown. His brother Arthur Brown, Jr, also played in the NFL and his uncle Lawrence Pete is a former Detroit Lions player.

His older brother Arthur is a former five-star linebacker recruit who played at Kansas State University and played for the Baltimore Ravens from 2013–2016. According to Jeremy Crabtree of Rivals.com, the Browns were the first brothers ever to be both ranked five-star recruits.
