= Wichita East High School =

School in Wichita, Kansas

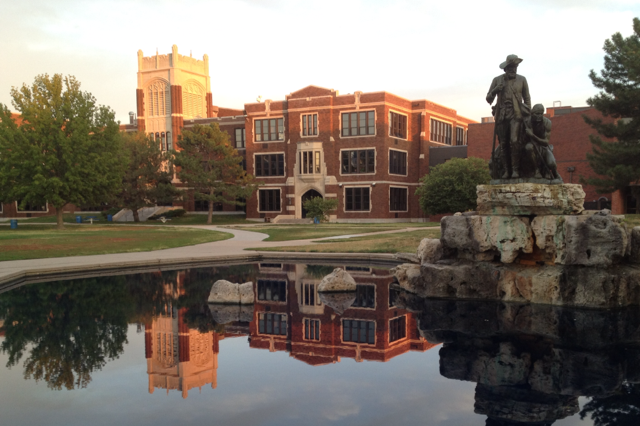

Location
- 2301 East Douglas Avenue; Wichita, Kansas 67211; United States; 37°40′56″N 97°18′34″W

Information
- School type: Public, high school
- Established: 1878
- School district: Wichita USD 259
- CEEB code: 173206
- Principal: Sara Richardson
- Teaching staff: 145.85 (on a FTE basis)
- Grades: 9 to 12
- Gender: coed
- Enrollment: 2,338 (2023–2024)
- Student to teacher ratio: 16.03
- Campus type: Urban
- Colors: Navy blue White; Columbia blue
- Athletics: Class 6A
- Athletics conference: Greater Wichita; Athletic League
- Mascot: Blue Aces
- Newspaper: The Messenger
- Yearbook: Echoes
- Website: east.usd259.org

Wichita East High School, known locally as "East", is a public secondary school in Wichita, Kansas, United States. It is operated by Wichita USD 259 school district. The centrally located school's 44-acre (180,000 m^{2}) campus and the building's Collegiate Gothic styling make it an urban landmark. The square footage of the East High campus today is 443,814. East's enrollment for the 2023–2024 school year was 2,338.

The school offers the International Baccalaureate program, a magnet program that teaches students at a college level, and which attracts students from across the city. The campus is also home to WSU Tech, a division of Wichita State University, which provides technical training and education.

== History ==
Wichita East traces its roots back to 1878, although the current building was completed in 1923. Originally known as Wichita High School, East was the first of seven traditional public high schools to be built in USD 259, Wichita's Unified School District. In 1929, when Wichita North High School was completed, the school's name was changed to Wichita East High School. Originally built on a campus shared with Roosevelt Junior High School, the high school's growing enrollment forced the conversion of the junior high school into a second wing of the high school.

The junior high school and high school were joined by a third structure in 1976–1977, a library and cafeteria that connected the second floor of the two buildings. In 2004, a construction project added a new gymnasium, converted the old gym into the science wing, and provided air conditioning to the entire building, but the renovation removed the building's swimming pool, auto mechanics building and 500 Hall, which housed the wood shops.

In 2011, East added a secondary gym and a new swimming pool. In 2012, the school opened the new performing arts center, featuring a 600-seat theater, instrumental rehearsal spaces and vocal music room.

In 2021, due to structural concerns, science classes were moved into one of the WSU Tech buildings, where they remained until revision of the science wing was completed in summer 2023.

== Academics ==
Wichita High School East is regionally recognized for both academic and athletic success. The school offers both the Wichita Public Schools diploma and the International Baccalaureate Diploma, a magnet diploma that students earn through the International Baccalaureate program. The school also offers many Advanced Placement, Honors, and college preparatory classes. The school also offers the AVID (Advancement Via Individual Determination) program for selective students. East consistently leads Wichita-area schools in academic awards. Both the high school's newspaper, The Messenger, and yearbook, "Echoes", have been recognized in national competitions, and the former is a member of the High School National Ad Network.

East has a debate and forensics squad with the debate team winning two state championships, in 2011 and 2023. In June 2007, East hosted the debate portion of NFL Nationals. East also has a Scholar's Bowl team winning 4 state championships in 1998, 2004, 2007, and most recently 2011.

== Extracurricular activities ==
=== Clubs and activities ===
East has over 50 clubs and activities in which students can participate. Many clubs embrace diversity, are active in the community, or promote entertainment. Clubs vary from Anime club to National Honor Society to Students Against Prejudice. Students can participate in school-centered activities like STUCO (student council) or follow personal interests in clubs like Tai Chi, Students Against Prejudice, the Young Democrats, or Ultimate Frisbee Club. The Big Do, a club fair held after school one evening each September, consists of all student organizations gathering on the front lawn to sell food and host activities. Every spring, East High holds "Aces in the Community," a day in which all students and faculty go out into Wichita to perform community service.

=== Athletics ===
East High holds 96 state championships with all their sports teams combined. Athletically, East is home to a consistently competitive basketball program that has 9 state championships. In addition, the Blue Aces football team, who have won 4 state championships, has been increasingly successful in recent years due to leadership changes as well as two highly acclaimed and heavily recruited brothers, Arthur (Class of 2008) and Bryce Brown (Class of 2009). East's football team was Wichita State's opponent in the first game in the program's history. East's Boys Swimming and Diving team has also won 14 State Championships, most recently one in 2013. East athletics compete in the Greater Wichita Athletic League against the city's seven largest public high schools and two private Catholic high schools. East is a 6A school, the largest size recognized by the Kansas High School Athletics Association. Since 1928, East High teams have been known as the Blue Aces, and the school is represented by its mascot, Max, a World War I flying ace with an oversized head and a pronounced cleft chin. The schools colors are Navy Blue and White with Columbia Blue as a third color.

==== Boys basketball ====
The boys basketball team has won several state championships. The team's tradition for success dates back to its 1915 state title, and has continued over 100 years to its 2015 Kansas 6A state title, a season during which the Aces posted an overall record of 24-1 and an average margin of victory of 23.7 points. 2015 marked the third consecutive year the Aces qualified for the state basketball tournament, as well as the Aces' second state title in 10 years and the third since 2002. The Aces play home games in the East gym, which has a seating capacity of 2,400.

==== National championship ====
The 1925 boys basketball team won the National Interscholastic Basketball Tournament in Chicago. The tournament was an attempt by Amos Alonzo Stagg to create a national high school champion which lasted from 1917 to 1930 before school administrators intervened to oppose the concept of a national tournament. Wichita defeated El Reno High School 27–6 in the final.

=== State championships ===
State Championships
Season	Sport	Number of Championships	Year
Fall	Football	4	1950, 1951, 1982, 1983
Fall	Cross Country, Boys	7	1948, 1949, 1957, 1958, 1959, 1962, 1964
Winter	Swimming and Diving, Boys	14	1931, 1940, 1941, 1942, 1958, 1959, 1960, 1961, 1962, 1963, 1965, 1966, 1967, 2013
Winter	Basketball, Boys	9	1915, 1925, 1951, 1962, 1972, 1992, 2002, 2005, 2015
Winter	Bowling, Girls	1	2013
Winter	Wrestling	10	1931, 1932, 1934, 1936, 1944, 1945, 1946, 1947, 1948, 1950
Winter	Debate, 2 Speaker	2	2011, 2023
Spring	Baseball	5	1945, 1946, 1951, 1956, 1957
Spring	Golf, Boys	11	1943, 1944, 1945, 1946, 1950, 1951, 1952, 1956, 1957, 1959, 1965
Spring	Outdoor Track and Field, Boys	28	1913, 1914, 1917, 1926, 1929, 1930, 1939, 1940, 1943, 1944, 1945, 1946, 1947, 1949, 1950, 1952, 1953, 1954, 1957, 1958, 1959, 1961, 1962, 1964, 1965, 1966, 1974, 1996
Spring	Indoor Track and Field, Boys	4	1957, 1965, 1966, 1967
Spring	Swimming and Diving, Girls	2	2017, 2018
Spring	Gymnastics, Boys	1	1963
Total		95	

== Notable alumni ==
- Ross McBurney (1925) – All-American basketball player at Wichita State
- Ford Carr – Member of the Kansas House of Representatives
- Stanley Counts (1943) – United States Navy rear admiral
- Daryl Spencer (1946) – former MLB player, played an additional eight years in Japan
- LaVannes Squires (1950) – first black basketball player for Kansas Jayhawks men's basketball program
- Bruce Conner (1951) – Beat Generation-era experimental artist who influenced the music video genre
- Clay Lacy (1951) – multiple world-record-holding air pilot and motion picture aerial coordinator
- Fritz Brickell (1953) – former MLB player New York Yankees and Los Angeles Dodgers
- Jeffrey Farrell (1954) – champion swimmer who went on to participate in the 1960 Olympics
- Ron Walters (1955) – civil rights pioneer, participant in 1958 Dockum Drug Store sit-in
- Philip Anschutz (1957) – billionaire
- Diane Bish (1959) – organist, composer, PBS television hostess
- George Tiller (1959) – physician, assassinated in 2009 for providing abortion services
- Robert Gates (1961) – Chancellor of the College of William & Mary, former Secretary of Defense, former CIA director and former president of Texas A&M University
- Jim Waskiewicz (1962) – All-American Football Player at Wichita State and former player for the New York Jets
- Jamie Thompson (1963) – All-American basketball player at Wichita State and amateur golf champion, professional basketball player for the Dallas Chaparrals
- Jim Ryun (1965) – former US Representative from Kansas and a world-record mile runner; recipient of the Presidential Medal of Freedom
- Chuck Jones (1970) – American astronaut, passenger on American Airlines Flight 11 that hit World Trade Center
- Kevin Kastning (1978) – composer and recording artist for Greydisc Records
- Kym Carter (1982) – received 10th place in the heptathlon at the 1992 Summer Olympics in Barcelona; won the bronze medal in the five-event pentathlon, at the 1997 IAAF World Indoor Championships
- Bruce McCray (1983) – former NFL player for the Chicago Bears
- Adrian Griffin (1992) – assistant coach for the Toronto Raptors
- Korleone Young (1998 - transferred) – former NBA player for the Detroit Pistons
- Taj Gray (2002) – professional basketball player
- Taryn Southern (2003) – singer and actress
- Arthur Brown (2008) – NFL linebacker
- Iris Menas (2008) – actor known for West Side Story
- Bryce Brown (2009) – NFL running back, 2009 Hall Trophy winner
- Oliver Bradwell (2010) – American sprinter, gold medalist at the 2010 World Junior Championships in Athletics
- Tobi Osunsanmi (2022) – college football defensive end for the Kansas State Wildcats
- Joe Walsh – guitarist for The Eagles, also attended East before moving to Columbus, Ohio
- Lily Wu – mayor of Wichita in 2024

== See also ==
- Education in Kansas
- List of high schools in Kansas
- List of unified school districts in Kansas
