= 2008 Washington Mystics season =

- Head coach: Tree Rollins (8-14); Jessie Kenlaw (2-10)
- Arena: Verizon Center

Results
- Record: 10–24 (.294)
- Place: 6th (Eastern)
- Playoff finish: Did not qualify

The 2008 WNBA season was the 11th season for the Washington Mystics women's professional basketball team. Despite a 10–16 record before the WNBA break for the Beijing Olympics, Mystics officials said that attendance at Verizon Center had risen from nearly 1,200 fans a game over the previous season, with total ticket revenue up 17 percent, and season-ticket sales for the 2008 season were up 20 percent from last season, bringing the team's base to nearly 3,000.

== Off-season ==
On October 2, 2007, the Mystics announced that Tree Rollins would be named the permanent head coach. Rollins had been the interim head coach since the resignation of Richie Adubato on June 1, 2007.

=== Expansion draft ===
Yelena Leuchanka was selected in the 2008 Expansion Draft for the Atlanta Dream.

=== WNBA draft ===
Round	Pick	Player	Nationality	School or club team
1	6	Crystal Langhorne	United States	Maryland
2	20	Lindsey Pluimer	United States	UCLA
3	34	Krystal Vaughn	United States	Virginia Commonwealth

== Transactions ==
=== Trades ===
April 22, 2008	To Washington Mystics Taj McWilliams-Franklin and a first-round pick in the 2009 WNBA draft	To Los Angeles Sparks DeLisha Milton-Jones
August 12, 2008	To Washington Mystics Tasha Humphrey, Eshaya Murphy, and a second-round pick in the 2009 WNBA draft	To Detroit Shock Taj McWilliams-Franklin

=== Free agents ===
Player	Signed	Former team
Amber Jacobs	March 17, 2008	Indiana Fever
Kendra Wecker	June 23, 2008	San Antonio Silver Stars

Player	Left	New team
Nikki Teasley	March 24, 2008	Atlanta Dream (August 15, 2008)
Stacey Lovelace	March 27, 2008	Atlanta Dream
Amber Jacobs	June 23, 2008	Los Angeles Sparks (July 7, 2008)
Kendra Wecker	August 12, 2008	

Player	Re-signed
Nakia Sanford	February 21, 2008
Alana Beard	February 25, 2008
Laurie Koehn	February 28, 2008
Coco Miller	September 14, 2008

== Regular season ==
- On July 19, 2008, Tree Rollins was fired by the team after an 8–14 start. Assistant coach Jessie Kenlaw was named as interim head coach.

=== Season standings ===
Eastern Conference	W	L	PCT	GB	Home	Road	Conf.
Detroit Shock ^{x}	22	12	.647	–	14–3	8–9	16–4
Connecticut Sun ^{x}	21	13	.618	1.0	13–4	8–9	13–7
New York Liberty ^{x}	19	15	.559	3.0	11–6	8–9	11–9
Indiana Fever ^{x}	17	17	.500	5.0	11–6	6–11	12–8
Chicago Sky ^{o}	12	22	.353	10.0	8–9	4–13	10–10
Washington Mystics ^{o}	10	24	.294	12.0	6–11	4–13	6–14
Atlanta Dream ^{o}	4	30	.118	18.0	1–16	3–14	2–18

=== Season schedule ===
Date	Opponent	Score	Leading scorer	Attendance	Record
May 17	@ Indiana	53-64	Nakia Sanford (14)	10,533	0-1
May 22	@ New York	60-79	Taj McWilliams-Franklin (26)	7,071	0-2
May 25	vs. Houston	69-66	Alana Beard (16)	10,441	1-2
May 27	vs. Atlanta	80-74	Alana Beard (25)	6,231	2-2
May 31	vs. Los Angeles	59-70	Monique Currie (15)	11,517	2-3
June 3	@ Phoenix	93-98	Alana Beard (33)	7,561	2-4
June 6	@ San Antonio	52-63	Alana Beard (13)	5,800	2-5
June 8	@ Connecticut	79-87	Monique Currie (28)	7,174	2-6
June 11	vs. Sacramento	76-79	Taj McWilliams-Franklin (23)	6,146	2-7
June 13	@ Chicago	64-57	Alana Beard (22)	2,600	3-7
June 18	@ Houston	67-63	Alana Beard (23)	7,054	4-7
June 20	vs. Atlanta	72-61	Alana Beard (18)	7,448	5-7
June 24	vs. Phoenix	90-98	Taj McWilliams-Franklin (31)	6,662	5-8
June 26	@ Los Angeles	77-74 (OT)	Monique Currie (24)	8,144	6-8
June 29	@ Seattle	49-64	Alana Beard (16)	7,965	6-9
July 1	@ Sacramento	81-87	Alana Beard (31)	5,705	6-10
July 6	vs. San Antonio	75-83	Alana Beard (20)	10,439	6-11
July 8	vs. Indiana	50-48	Taj McWilliams-Franklin (20)	7,587	7-11
July 11	@ Detroit	66-79	Coco Miller (15)	8,596	7-12
July 13	vs. Connecticut	69-64	Nikki Blue (13)	9,610	8-12
July 17	@ New York	56-77	Alana Beard (15)	8,344	8-13
July 18	vs. Detroit	62-99	Taj McWilliams-Franklin (13)	6,834	8-14
July 20	vs. Seattle	89-57	Taj McWilliams-Franklin (22)	8,543	9-14
July 23	vs. New York	73-80	Taj McWilliams-Franklin (19)	16,121	9-15
July 25	@ Atlanta	81-75	Taj McWilliams-Franklin (13)	8,279	10-15
July 27	vs. Connecticut	60-82	Taj McWilliams-Franklin (11)	9,357	10-16
August 29	vs. Chicago	75-79	Alana Beard (18)	10,043	10-17
August 30	@ Minnesota	78-92	Alana Beard (27)	6,980	10-18
September 2	vs. Indiana	68-79	Alana Beard (17)	7,244	10-19
September 6	vs. Detroit	69-84	Monique Currie (15)	9,976	10-20
September 9	@ Chicago	59-78	Tasha Humphrey (15)	3,087	10-21
September 11	@ Detroit	66-78	Alana Beard (16); Monique Currie (16)	8,145	10-22
September 13	@ Connecticut	81-87	Monique Currie (23)	8,652	10-23
September 14	vs. Minnesota	70-96	Alana Beard (17)	10,438	10-24

== Player stats ==
Legend
GP	Games played	GS	Games started	MPG	Minutes per game
FG%	Field-goal percentage	3P%	3-point field-goal percentage	FT%	Free-throw percentage
RPG	Rebounds per game	APG	Assists per game	SPG	Steals per game
BPG	Blocks per game	PPG	Points per game

=== Regular season ===
Player	GP	GS	MPG	FG%	3P%	FT%	RPG	APG	SPG	BPG	PPG
Alana Beard	33	33	33.1	.395	.354	.733	3.6	3.5	1.7	0.6	16.1
Taj McWilliams-Franklin	26	26	33.2	.525	.280	.730	7.3	1.6	1.7	1.0	13.3
Monique Currie	34	34	28.6	.401	.375	.826	4.1	2.5	0.9	0.4	11.9
Tasha Humphrey	8	7	26.5	.415	.379	.588	6.1	1.1	0.5	0.3	11.1
Nakia Sanford	34	28	23.4	.452	.000	.398	5.7	1.2	0.6	0.3	6.7
Coco Miller	34	6	20.9	.355	.283	.625	2.5	1.4	0.8	0.2	5.3
Crystal Langhorne	34	6	15.6	.624	.000	.549	4.0	0.4	0.4	0.2	4.8
Crystal Smith	28	4	14.0	.355	.368	.806	1.0	0.9	0.5	0.1	4.3
Nikki Blue	26	22	20.7	.324	.438	.760	1.6	2.8	0.7	0.1	3.8
Andrea Gardner	22	0	8.1	.379	.000	.542	2.3	0.3	0.1	0.0	2.6
Laurie Koehn	30	0	4.8	.393	.418	.000	0.4	0.1	0.0	0.0	2.4
Bernice Mosby	24	1	7.6	.392	.000	.667	2.2	0.1	0.1	0.3	2.0
Amber Jacobs	6	3	13.7	.250	.300	.500	1.2	1.8	0.5	0.0	1.7
Eshaya Murphy	2	0	5.5	.333	.000	.000	1.5	0.5	0.0	0.0	1.0
Krystal Vaughn	15	0	5.2	.158	.000	.600	1.0	0.0	0.1	0.1	0.8
Kendra Wecker	9	0	5.3	.118	.143	.000	1.2	0.8	0.3	0.0	0.6

Washington Mystics Regular Season Stats

== Roster ==
2008 Washington Mystics roster
Players
Coaches

Pos.	No.	Nat.	Name	Height	Weight	From
G/F	20	(United States)	Beard, Alana	5' 11" (1.8m)	160 lb (73kg)	Duke
PG	32	(United States)	Blue, Nikki	5' 8" (1.73m)	163 lb (74kg)	UCLA
PF	25	(United States)	Currie, Monique	6' 0" (1.83m)	177 lb (80kg)	Duke
PF	52	(United States)	Gardner, Andrea	6' 3" (1.91m)	190 lb (86kg)	Howard University
C	34	(United States)	Humphrey, Tasha	6' 3" (1.91m)		Georgia
SG	12	(United States)	Koehn, Laurie	5' 8" (1.73m)	145 lb (66kg)	Kansas State
C	1	(United States)	Langhorne, Crystal	6' 2" (1.88m)	184 lb (83kg)	Maryland
SG	9	(United States)	Miller, Coco	5' 9" (1.75m)	140 lb (64kg)	Georgia
PF	33	(United States)	Mosby, Bernice	6' 1" (1.85m)	172 lb (78kg)	Baylor
SG	14	(United States)	Murphy, Eshaya	5' 11" (1.8m)	164 lb (74kg)	USC
C	43	(United States)	Sanford, Nakia	6' 4" (1.93m)	200 lb (91kg)	Kansas
PG	15	(United States)	Smith, Crystal	5' 6" (1.68m)	121 lb (55kg)	Iowa
PF	5	(United States)	Vaughn, Krystal	6' 1" (1.85m)	160 lb (73kg)	VCU

Head coach
(United States) Jessie Kenlaw (Savannah State)
Assistant coaches
(United States) Crystal Robinson (SE Oklahoma State)
Athletic trainer
(United States) Navin Hettiarachchi (West Virginia)

Legend

- (C) Team captain
- (DP) Unsigned draft pick
- (FA) Free agent
- (S) Suspended
- Injured

WNBA roster page
