= Jessie Kenlaw =

Jessie Kenlaw (born July 3, 1953) worked in collegiate and professional women's basketball between the 1970s to 2000s. After playing a year of collegiate basketball with Savannah State University, Kenlaw started playing professional basketball with the Women's Professional Basketball League in the late 1970s. Kenlaw later briefly joined the Ladies Professional Basketball Association and Women's American Basketball Association during the early 1980s. For her coaching career, Kenlaw started as an assistant coach for Lamar University from 1987 to 1988. After moving to the University of Houston in 1988, Kenlaw continued working as an assistant coach before being named head coach of the Houston Cougars women's basketball team in 1990. As Houston's head coach from 1990 to 1998, Kenlaw had 104 wins and 123 losses.

Kenlaw resumed her assistant coach tenure with the Colorado Xplosion in 1998 and Louisiana Tech from 1999 to 2000. In 2000, Kenlaw entered the WNBA and had assistant coaching positions with the Portland Fire, Seattle Storm and Houston Comets until 2007. In 2008, Kenlaw was an assistant coach and scouting director for the Washington Mystics before being named interim head coach for the team in July 2008. During her head coaching tenure with the Mystics, Kenlaw had two wins and ten losses before being replaced by Julie Plank in November 2008.

== Early life and education ==
On July 3, 1953, Kenlaw was born in Savannah, Georgia. Growing up, Kenlaw lived in Guyton, Georgia while participating in track and field, softball, and basketball. For her post-secondary education, Kenlaw went to Savannah State University for a physical education bachelor's degree. While at Savannah State, Kenlaw played on the newly established women's basketball team from 1976 to 1977 upon graduating in 1977.

== Career ==
After completing her studies, Kenlaw was a teacher before moving to women's basketball in the late 1970s. When the Women's Professional Basketball League was established in 1978, Kenlaw was selected by the Houston Angels as a free agent and started playing for the team in December of that year. Kenlaw won the 1978-79 championship with the Angels and remained with the team until they disbanded in 1980. During the early 1980s, Kenlaw briefly played in the Ladies Professional Basketball Association with the Phoenix Flames before the league shut down in 1981. In 1984, Kenlaw went to the Women's American Basketball Association to play for the Houston Shamrocks before the league folded that same year.

After ending her playing career, Kenlaw became an AAU softball and basketball player while also working as a high school coach. Kenlaw began her collegiate career as an assistant coach for Lamar University from 1987 to 1988 and the University of Houston from 1988 to 1990. In April 1990, Kenlaw took over as the Houston Cougars women's basketball head coach when Greg Williams left his position. As the head coach of the Cougars, Kenlaw had 104 wins and 123 losses before stepping down from her position in March 1998. A couple of months later, Kenslaw became an assistant coach for the Colorado Xplosion in July 1998 as part of the American Basketball League. She remained in the ABL until the league closed down at the end of 1998. Kenlaw returned to college basketball as an assistant coach for Louisiana Tech in 1999 and remained there until 2000.

Kenlaw entered the WNBA as an assistant coach with the Portland Fire from 2000 to 2002. She continued her WNBA assistant coaching career with the Seattle Storm from 2003 to 2006 and the Houston Comets in 2007. At the beginning of 2008, Kenlaw became an assistant coach and scouting director for the Washington Mystics. In July 2008, Kenlaw became the interim head coach for the Mystics after Tree Rollins was fired from the team. With the Mystics, Kenlaw had two wins and ten losses that year before being replaced by Julie Plank in November 2008. Kenlaw continued her assistant coach career with the Nigeria women's national basketball team at the 2020 Summer Olympics.

== Head coaching record ==
=== WNBA ===
Team	Year	G	W	L	W–L%	Finish	PG	PW	PL	PW–L%	Result
Washington	2008	12	2	10	.167	6th in Eastern	—	—	—	—	Missed playoffs
Career		12	2	10	.167		—	—	—	—	
