= Bel Aire, Kansas =

City in Sedgwick County, Kansas

- City
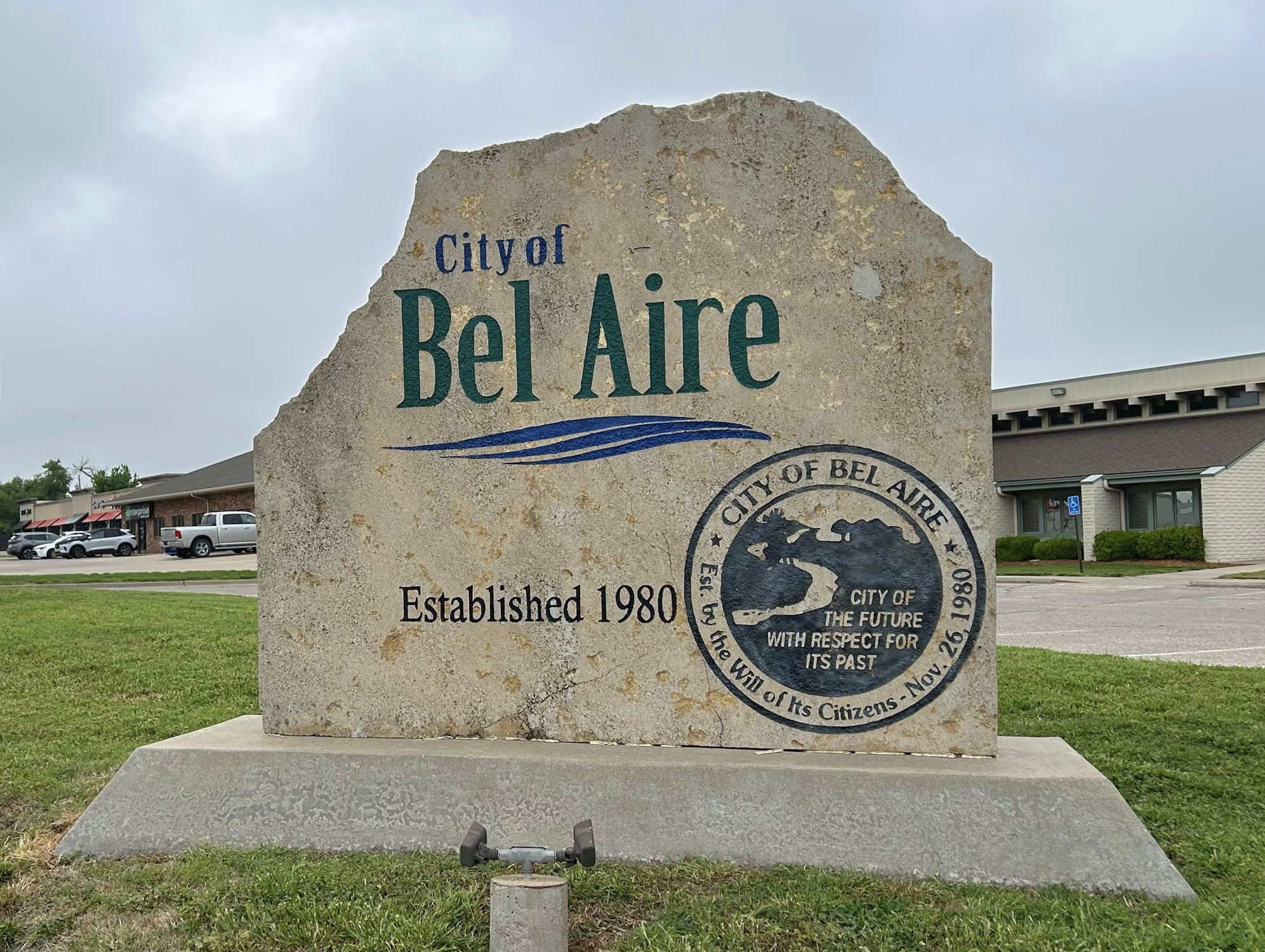
- Welcome sign in Bel Aire (2026)

- Location within Sedgwick County and Kansas
- Interactive map of Bel Aire, Kansas
- Coordinates: 37°45′50″N 97°15′58″W
- Country: United States
- State: Kansas
- County: Sedgwick
- Founded: 1955
- Incorporated: 1980

Area
  - Total: 6.80 sq mi (17.60 km^{2})
  - Land: 6.76 sq mi (17.52 km^{2})
  - Water: 0.031 sq mi (0.08 km^{2})
- Elevation: 1,394 ft (425 m)

Population (2020)
  - Total: 8,262
  - Density: 1,221/sq mi (471.6/km^{2})
- Time zone: UTC-6 (CST)
  - Summer (DST): UTC-5 (CDT)
- ZIP Codes: 67220, 67226
- Area code: 316
- FIPS code: 20-05400
- GNIS ID: 473837
- Website: belaireks.gov

Bel Aire is a city in Sedgwick County, Kansas, United States, and a northeastern suburb of Wichita. As of the 2020 census, the population of the city was 8,262.

== History ==
Bel Aire was founded in January 1955 when a group of local residents petitioned the county government to create it as an improvement district for water.

On November 26, 1980, Bel Aire formally incorporated as a city, despite a two-year legal dispute with the Wichita city government over whether or not it had the right to do so. The case ultimately went to the Kansas Supreme Court, which ruled in Bel Aire's favor.

== Geography ==
Bel Aire lies on the north side of the East Fork of Chisholm Creek, roughly 6 mi (9.7 km) northeast of the Arkansas River in the Wellington-McPherson Lowlands region of the Great Plains. Located on the south side of K-254 in south-central Kansas, Bel Aire is within the Wichita metropolitan area, bordered by Wichita to the south and west and bordered by Kechi to the north.

According to the United States Census Bureau, the city has a total area of 6.86 square miles (17.77 km^{2}), of which 6.83 square miles (17.69 km^{2}) is land and 0.03 square miles (0.08 km^{2}) is water.

== Demographics ==
Historical population
Census	Pop.	Note	%±
1990	3,695		—
2000	5,836		57.9%
2010	6,769		16.0%
2020	8,262		22.1%
2023 (est.)	9,537		15.4%
U.S. Decennial Census; 2010-2020

Bel Aire is part of the Wichita, KS Metropolitan Statistical Area.

=== 2020 census ===
As of the 2020 census, Bel Aire had a population of 8,262, with 3,080 households and 2,234 families. The population density was 1,221.5 per square mile (471.6/km^{2}). There were 3,258 housing units at an average density of 481.7 per square mile (186.0/km^{2}).

The median age was 38.3 years. 23.7% of residents were under the age of 18 and 19.1% were 65 years of age or older. For every 100 females there were 91.7 males, and for every 100 females age 18 and over there were 90.1 males age 18 and over. 100.0% of residents lived in urban areas, while 0.0% lived in rural areas.

Of the 3,080 households, 32.5% had children under the age of 18 living in them. Of all households, 59.3% were married-couple households, 13.2% were households with a male householder and no spouse or partner present, and 22.6% were households with a female householder and no spouse or partner present. About 22.6% of all households were made up of individuals and 11.9% had someone living alone who was 65 years of age or older. There were 3,258 housing units, of which 5.5% were vacant. The homeowner vacancy rate was 2.1% and the rental vacancy rate was 8.1%.

Racial composition as of the 2020 census
Race	Number	Percent
White	6,136	74.3%
Black or African American	820	9.9%
American Indian and Alaska Native	41	0.5%
Asian	377	4.6%
Native Hawaiian and Other Pacific Islander	3	0.0%
Some other race	166	2.0%
Two or more races	719	8.7%
Hispanic or Latino (of any race)	628	7.6%

=== Demographic estimates ===
The average household size was 3.0 and the average family size was 3.3. The percent of those with a bachelor's degree or higher was estimated to be 36.4% of the population.

=== Income and poverty ===
The 2016–2020 5-year American Community Survey estimates show that the median household income was $84,605 (with a margin of error of +/- $20,847) and the median family income was $98,750 (+/- $21,163). Males had a median income of $44,161 (+/- $5,434) versus $33,880 (+/- $3,945) for females. The median income for those above 16 years old was $38,015 (+/- $7,931). Approximately, 4.8% of families and 7.2% of the population were below the poverty line, including 12.6% of those under the age of 18 and 1.0% of those ages 65 or over.

=== 2010 census ===
As of the 2010 census, there were 6,769 people, 2,465 households, and 1,854 families living in the city. The population density was 991.1 inhabitants per square mile (382.7/km^{2}). There were 2,554 housing units at an average density of 373.9 per square mile (144.4/km^{2}). The racial makeup of the city was 81.1% White, 8.6% African American, 0.9% Native American, 4.5% Asian, 1.4% from other races, and 3.5% from two or more races. Hispanic or Latino of any race were 4.8% of the population.

There were 2,465 households, of which 38.7% had children under the age of 18 living with them, 65.3% were married couples living together, 7.2% had a female householder with no husband present, 2.7% had a male householder with no wife present, and 24.8% were non-families. 21.3% of all households were made up of individuals, and 9.6% had someone living alone who was 65 years of age or older. The average household size was 2.75 and the average family size was 3.21.

The median age in the city was 36 years. 28.3% of residents were under the age of 18; 6.7% were between the ages of 18 and 24; 26.3% were from 25 to 44; 26.9% were from 45 to 64; and 11.6% were 65 years of age or older. The gender makeup of the city was 48.2% male and 51.8% female.

== Education ==
The city is served by Wichita USD 259 and Circle USD 375 public school districts. Bel Aire has two private schools as well: Sunrise Christian Academy (Pre-K to 12) and Resurrection Catholic School (Pre-K to 5).

The Northeast Magnet High School, operated by Wichita USD 259 public school district, is located in Bel Aire.
