= Wichita South High School =

Location
- 701 West 33rd Street South; Wichita, Kansas 67217; 37.631748°N 97.345361°W

Information
- School type: Public, High School
- Established: 1959
- School district: Wichita USD 259
- CEEB code: 173211
- Principal: Travis Rodgers
- Teaching staff: 113.44 (FTE)
- Grades: 9 to 12
- Gender: Coed
- Enrollment: 1,661 (2023-2024)
- Student to teacher ratio: 14.64
- Campus type: Urban
- Colors: Red; Royal Blue
- Athletics: Class 6A
- Athletics conference: GWAL
- Sports: 19 (10 Boys, 9 Girls)
- Mascot: Titans
- Rival: Wichita West
- Newspaper: The Torch
- Yearbook: Sceptre
- Communities served: Wichita
- Website: south.usd259.org

Wichita South High School, known locally as South, is a public secondary school in Wichita, Kansas. It is operated by Wichita USD 259 school district and serves students in grades 9 to 12. It is also known as Wichita High School South. The school colors are blue and red. The school's enrollment was 1,752 during the 2018–19 school year, making it the 16th largest high school in Kansas and the 4th largest in Wichita.

== History ==
South first opened its doors in 1959. South's floor plan was modeled exactly after the Southeast's floor plan for their original building on Edgemoor. When South opened, their sports teams were known as the Colonels. In the 1970s, the Wichita School board requested that South change their mascot name. The name Titans was chosen by students and the original Titan logo, which is still used by the school to this day, was drawn by a student. In the late 1970s, a $2 million football stadium was built. In 1985, South High athletic director C. Elmer Carpenter died and the football stadium was named in his honor. Also, in the 1980s, Sims Elementary, which was situated just a few hundred feet from the eastern end of the school, closed. South began using the old elementary school for the language arts department.

The school went up to 2004 without any major changes. In 2003, the school board approved a construction project to connect the main building of South to the "Sim Building" (as students and faculty called it), the project also added two new hallways and 20 new classrooms. The project began in early 2004 and was finally completed a year later in 2005. Also added to the school, from the same bond issue, was a baseball field that opened for play in 2007.

In 2008, another bond issue was passed by the Wichita School Board to create "equal athletic facility opportunities" for all Wichita high schools. South's share of the bond issue was $10 million, which was used to put a new floor on the gym, buy new equipment for the school's weight room, improvements to the school's tennis court, and renovations to Carpenter Stadium including putting in Fieldturf on the field and new goalposts, as well as resurfacing the track.

On October 24, 2011, the Wichita School Board approved a $14.2 million bond issue to build a new 2,400-seat gym, a new practice room for the wrestling team, a walking track, and new locker rooms, as well as a new swimming pool, music suite, new pottery studio, art space, digital photography classrooms, a culinary arts room and a room devoted to its new fire science program that started in the 2011–2012 school year.

== Student demographics ==
Wichita South's 2008–2009 enrollment was 1,617 students. The demographic breakdown of the population is as follows: 55.6% of students are white, 19.6% are African-American, 13.9% are Hispanic, 2.7% are Asian, 4.1% are American Indian, and 4.2% are multi-ethnic. As of 2008, 59% of South's students, due to a low-income family, qualified for reduced lunches. The student-teacher ratio is 22:1. South teachers had an average of 7 years of teaching experience as of 2008. Additionally, south high employed 114 certified classroom teachers, 61 of whom hold master's degrees. The drop-out rate in 2007 was 7%, compared to a district average of 4%. The graduation rate for 2007 was 67.7%, compared to a district average of 76.4%.

== Athletics ==
South is a member of the Kansas State High School Activities Association and offers a variety of sports programs. Athletic teams compete in the 6A division and the Greater Wichita Athletic League and are known as the Titans. Throughout its history, South has won 26 state championships. The schools most successful sports are its boys and girls basketball teams and its now defunct girls' gymnastics team. South's sports rival is Wichita West.

=== Facilities ===
Field	Sports using Field	Surface	Notes
Carpenter Stadium	Football, Track, Boys Soccer, Girls Soccer	Fieldturf	Named for former South AD who died during his tenure, also used by East and North football teams
Tim Milsap Field	Boys Soccer, Girls Soccer	Grass	Only used during the annual soccer tournament, the Titan Classic, named for South High alumni who was killed in the Iraq War
South High Gymnasium	Boys Basketball, Girls Basketball, Wrestling, Volleyball	N/A	New gym finished in 2013
South Field	Baseball	Grass	Opened in 2007
Seneca Bowl	Boys Bowling, Girls Bowling	N/A	Public Bowling alley used by school for practice and home meets

=== State championships ===
State Championships
Season	Sport	Number of Championships	Year
Fall	Girls Gymnastics*	5	1974, 1975, 1976, 1977, 1988
Winter	Wrestling	2	1975, 1978
Winter	Boys Basketball	10	1978, 1979, 1980, 1981, 1988, 1989, 1991, 1993, 1994, 1996
Winter	Girls Basketball	5	1978, 2013, 2014, 2015, 2016
Winter	Boys Bowling	1	2006
Spring	Baseball	2	1968, 1980
Spring	Softball	1	1990
Total		26	

*Sport discontinued

== Notable alumni ==
- Robert Courtney, former pharmacist who is in prison for diluting cancer drugs
- Tim Elliott, UFC fighter
- Ted Gilmore, college football coach at Michigan State University
- Davontae Harris, NFL cornerback that is a free agent
- Skinny Hightower, jazz pianist
- Don Johnson, actor
- Allen Lyday, former defensive back for the Houston Oilers
- Lawrence Pete, former defensive tackle for the Detroit Lions
- Vicki Schmidt, politician, Kansas Insurance Commissioner.
- Jamall Walker, basketball coach at Grand Canyon University
- Kyle Wilson NFL and CFL linebacker for the Hamilton Tiger-Cats
- Steve Woodberry, scout for the Minnesota Timberwolves

== See also ==
- Education in Kansas
- List of high schools in Kansas
- List of unified school districts in Kansas
