= Wichita USD 259 =

Public school district in Wichita, Kansas

Wichita USD 259 Wichita Public Schools

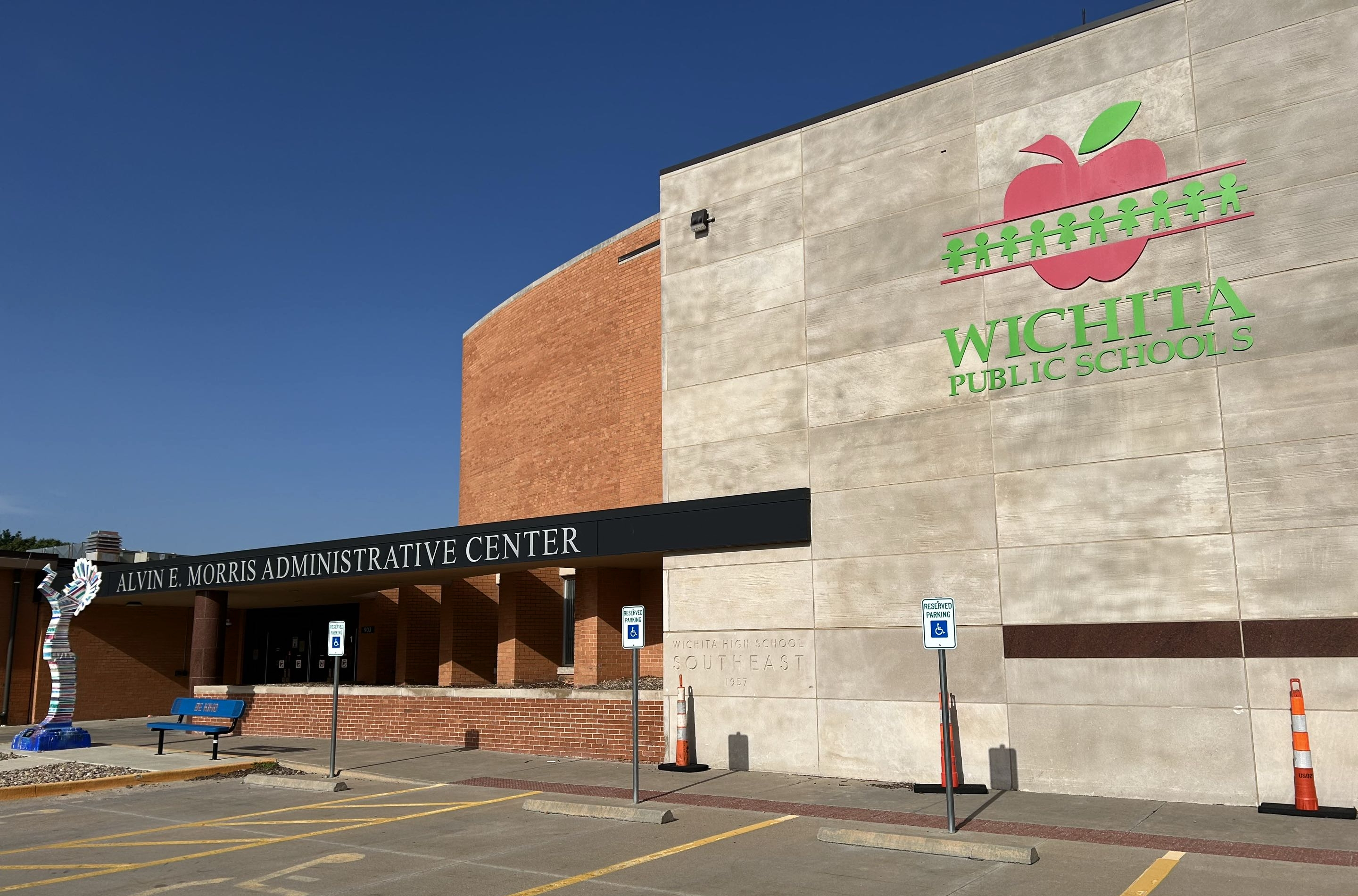
- Alvin E. Morris Administrative Center in 2026

Address
- 903 S. Edgemoor St. Wichita, Kansas, 67218; United States
- Coordinates: 37°40′15″N 97°16′22″W

District information
- Type: Public
- Grades: Pre-K to 12
- Superintendent: Kelly Bielefeld

Students and staff
- Students: 50,639

Other information
- Website: usd259.org

Wichita USD 259 is a public unified school district headquartered in Wichita, Kansas, United States. The district includes most of the cities of Wichita, Bel Aire, Eastborough, and Kechi.

== Overview ==
The largest school district in the state of Kansas, USD 259 had these approximate statistics in 2016:

- Students: 49,851
- Teachers and staff: about 9,000
- Budget: about $650 million
- Graduation rate: about 75%
- Schools:
  - 54 - Elementary schools
  - 3 - "K-8" schools (combined elementary/middle schools)
  - 15 - Middle schools
  - 9 - High schools
  - 12 - Special program sites

(Of these schools, 24 are specialized-curriculum "magnet" schools.)

The National Center for Educational Statistics (NCES) of the U.S. Department of Education, in 2006, reported that, in the fall of 2004, the Wichita Public Schools ranked 91st largest, by total enrollment, among all school districts in the nation. It also indicated that the Wichita Public Schools, in 2003–2004, had a total revenue of $452,437,000.

== School board ==
The Wichita Public Schools (USD 259) are governed by a non-partisan elected school board, the USD 259 Board of Education (BoE), which has seven members. Six members are nominated by voters in six geographically defined board districts throughout the overall school district. There is one nominee from each district. Those nominated then run for election district-wide. The seventh board member is nominated, and then elected, from the school district at large. Elections are for four-year terms, and are held in odd-numbered years (winners taking office the following January). Members are elected with staggered terms. Three members are up for election in 2020; then, two years later, the remaining four members are elected.

== Administration ==
=== Superintendent ===
The Wichita Public Schools chief executive is the Superintendent of Schools.

Alicia Thompson became Superintendent in July, 2017—the District's first woman, and first African-American, to hold that post. She was previously the district's assistant superintendent for elementary schools. Thompson is one of the district's few superintendents, in recent decades, to be promoted to that post from within the district; most have come from out-of-state. However, polling of the public, during the latest superintendent-hiring process, informed the Wichita BoE that the community strongly preferred a local person, from within the Wichita Public Schools system, for the post. Thompson, who attended Wichita Public Schools at all levels, from kindergarten though high school graduation, served in the district as an elementary school teacher, principal and administration executive, prior to appointment as assistant superintendent, then superintendent.

Thompson succeeded Superintendent John Allison (who announced his resignation, to become superintendent of the Olathe Public Schools in Olathe); Allison served as superintendent since 2009, succeeding Winston Brooks, who resigned in 2008.

In March 2023, the school board named Kelly Bielefeld to be the new superintendent starting on July 1.

== Schools ==
The school district operates the following schools:

=== High schools ===
- Wichita East High School
- Wichita Heights High School
- Wichita North High School
- Wichita Northwest High School
- Wichita South High School
- Wichita Southeast High School
- Wichita West High School
- Northeast Magnet High School
- Sowers Alternative
- Gateway Alternative Program Center
- Chisholm Life Skills Center

=== Middle schools ===
==== Regular ====
- Coleman Middle School
- Curtis Middle School
- Hamilton Middle School
- Marshall Middle School
- Mead Middle School
- Pleasant Valley Middle School
- Robinson Middle School
- Stucky Middle School
- Truesdell Middle School
- Wilbur Middle School

=== Magnet and special-purpose schools ===
- Allison Traditional Magnet Middle School
- Brooks Center for STEM and Arts Magnet Middle School
- Mayberry Cultural and Fine Arts Magnet Middle School
- Wells Alternative (Program)

=== Elementary schools ===
==== Regular ====
- Adams Elementary School
- Allen Elementary School
- Anderson Elementary School
- Beech Elementary School
- Benton Elementary School
- Caldwell Elementary School
- Cessna Elementary School
- Chisholm Trail Elementary School
- Cloud Elementary School
- College Hill Elementary School
- Colvin Elementary School
- Enterprise Elementary School
- Franklin Elementary School
- Gammon Elementary School
- Gardiner Elementary School
- Griffith Elementary School
- Harry Street Elementary School
- Irving Elementary School
- Jackson Elementary School
- Jefferson Elementary School
- Kelly Liberal Arts Academy
- Kensler Elementary School
- Lawrence Elementary School
- Linwood Elementary School
- McCollom Elementary School
- OK Elementrary School
- Ortiz Elementrary School
- Peterson Elementary School
- Pleasant Valley Elementary School
- Seltzer Elementary School
- Stanley Elementary School
- Washington Elementary School
- White Elementary School
- Woodman Elementary School

==== Magnet and special-purpose schools ====
- Black Traditional Magnet Elementary School
- Bostic Traditional Magnet Elementary School
- Bryant Opportunity Academy
- Buckner Performing Arts and Science Magnet Elementary School
- Dodge Literacy Magnet Elementary School
- Earhart Environmental Magnet Elementary School
- Enders Leadership and Community Service Magnet Elementary
- Hyde Leadership and International Explorations Magnet
- Isely Traditional Magnet Elementary School
- L'Ouverture Career Exploration and Technology Magnet Elementary School
- Levy Special Education Center
- McLean Science and Technology Magnet
- Minneha Core Knowledge Magnet Elementary School
- Mueller Aerospace and Engineering Discovery Magnet Elementary School
- Price-Harris Communications Magnet Elementary School
- Riverside Leadership Magnet Elementary School
- Spaght Science and Communications Magnet Elementary School
- Woodland Health and Wellness Magnet

=== Kindergarten through 8th grade schools ===
- Christa McAuliffe K-8 Academy
- Gordon Parks Academy STEM Leaders in Applied and Media Arts
- Horace Mann K-8 Dual Language Magnet School

=== Kindergarten through 12th grade schools ===
- Education Imagine Academy
- Levy Special Education Center

=== Preschool ===
- Little Early Childhood Center

=== Vocational/technical and continuing education schools ===
Beginning in 1931, and continuing until 2004, the Wichita Public Schools had vocational education programs, both in regular schools and in special vocational/technical and continuing-education schools. These programs primarily served secondary school students, but also served adults returning for further education and training.

In 1931 and 1952, vocational buildings were added onto the south side of Wichita High School East, and along adjacent Grove Street, to provide training in vocational and industrial arts. Between 1952 and 1968, about 600 students enrolled each year in various vocational courses there. In the summer of 1968, the district chose this site to open its Wichita Area Vocational-Technical School (WAVTS) "Vocational Technical Center" (by 1996, officially, the "Grove Campus" of the Wichita Area Technical College). This facility, under a separate administration, offered training in 18 different areas of trade and industry, to both students and adults.

In 1953, bowing to decades of pressure from West Wichitans, the district built the first high school in West Wichita - Wichita High School West, which, at its inception was primarily a vocational-technical school (initially, only 22% of West High graduates went on to college). Consequently, the West High curriculum initially emphasized vocational preparation, rather than academics. A large homemaking department taught students family budgeting, food preparation, child care and family relations. The school's business education department taught secretarial training, stenography, retail selling and business. An industrial education department taught woodworking, metalworking, auto mechanics, electrical work, printing, mechanical drawing and other trades. However, the school eventually became a regular academic high school, which it is today.

From 1965 to 2004, the Wichita Public Schools operated a system of vocational and continuing education which chiefly included:

- the School of Vocational Education (officially the Wichita Area Vocational-Technical School - WAVTS - on Grove Street, behind Wichita High School East)
- the School of Continuing Education (in the original Wichita High School building at Third and Emporia streets—by 1970, designated the "Central Vocational School," by 1984 the "Central Vocational Building" (CVB), and by 1996, the "WATC Central Campus")

By 1973, the Wichita Area Vocational Technical School had become the largest public school in Wichita, with over 5,000 people enrolling in its classes each year. WAVTS had expanded its vocational training from rudimentary crafts, to include advanced industrial skills such as estimating, procurement, production line setup and production scheduling. Concurrently, traditional home economics courses were still being taught at secondary schools throughout the system, but had been expanded to provide professional food service skills. Wichita's superintendent of schools, at the time, reportedly declared that they were "offering... an educational mix" divided "equally between" normal "academic training" courses and "advanced vocational schooling"—vocational training that was "geared" towards "real concepts and needs", to prepare students for "job hunting."

An additional WAVTS campus was established at the Wichita Municipal Airport to teach aircraft maintenance and provide training for occupations in Wichita's principal industry, aviation. However, difficulties between the aviation industry and WAVTS led to local industry leaders inviting Cowley County Community College to establish a substitute facility at the former Cessna Aircraft Field in southeast Wichita.

In 1987, the Wichita Area Vocational Technical School partnered with Butler County Community College to develop an Associate of Applied Science degree in electronic engineering technology. A technical school could not offer an associate degree, so the partnering with Butler was necessary. At the request of Wichita community business leaders in late 1990, Wichita State University and the technical school partnered to offer this degree through WSU, and the agreement and degree were approved by the Kansas Board of Regents in 1991

In 1999, the name of WAVTS changed to Wichita Area Technical College (WATC), and the college gained authority to grant college credit, and was empowered to award Associate of Applied Science (AAS) degrees.

In 2004, however, following strained relations between local industry and WATC, the Wichita Public Schools (USD 259) Board of Education transitioned WATC out of USD 259, and WATC became an independent public college, governed by its own board, the Sedgwick County Technical Education and Training Authority.

Following the district's 2004 divestiture of WAVTS (as WATC), Cowley's aviation training facility was acquired by WATC, then replaced by WATC, in 2010, with the National Center for Aviation Training (NCAT) at Wichita's Jabara Airport.

In 2001, an addition was made to the Levy Special Education Center, which included a vocational training center for the developmentally disabled.

== Closed schools ==
The following schools are slated to close in the next few years

- L'Ouverture Career Exploration and Technology Magnet Elementary School
- OK Elementrary School
- Pleasant Valley Elementary School
- Woodland Health and Wellness Magnet

One school has closed in early 2026

- Chester I. Lewis Academic Learning Center
  - Wichita Alternative High School
  - Wichita Adult Learning Center

The following schools were closed after the 2023–24 school year:

- Hadley Middle School
- Jardine Middle School
- Clark Elementary
- Cleveland Elementary - Building used for Lewis students and staff after the closure of the latter.
- Park Elementary
- Payne Elementary

The following schools were closed after the 2011–12 school year:

- Emerson Open Magnet Elementary - now Gateway Alternative Program Center
- Bryant Core Knowledge Magnet Elementary - now Bryant Opportunity Academy
- Lincoln Elementary - closed in the 2011–12 school year
- Mueller Aerospace and Engineering Discovery Magnet Elementary - relocated
- Lewis Open Magnet Elementary - now Enders Elementary School.

Schools closed in past decades:

- Alcott Alternative Middle School - 3400 E. Murdock, now Alcott Place Apartments
- Arkansas Avenue Elementary - 3361 N. Arkansas, demolished
- Booth Elementary - 5920 E. Mount Vernon, now MakeITC
- Bridgeport Elementary - 3601 N. Saint Francis, Currently vacant, has seen several uses since closure
- Brookside Elementary - 3621 E. Cessna, demolished
- Carleton Elementary - 428 S. Broadway, demolished
- Carter Elementary - 4640 E. 15th, abandoned
- Central Intermediate School - 324 N. Emporia, now The Flats 324
- Douglass Elementary - 617 N. Water, demolished
- Eureka Elementary - 573 S. West, demolished
- Fabrique Elementary - 5730 S. Ridgecrest Rd, demolished
- Fairmount Elementary - 1515 N. Lorraine, demolished
- Field Elementary - 3006 W. Saint Louis, abandoned
- Finn Elementary - 520 W. 25th, demolished
- Funston Elementary - 4801 S. Hydraulic, demolished
- Former Greiffenstein Alternative Elementary - 1221 E. Galena, demolished
- Ingalls Elementary - 2316 E. 10th St, demolished
- Kellogg Science and Technology Magnet Elementary - 1220 E. Kellogg, converted into an apartment complex, aptly named Kellogg Elementary Apartments
- Kistler Elementary - 4531 E. 37th, demolished
- Former Linwood Elementary - 1340 S. Pattie, 2 story building built in 1910, demolished but multipurpose room still exists.
- Longfellow Elementary - 2116 S. Main, Converted to private residence.
- Lowell Elementary - 408 N. Grove, demolished
- MacArthur Elementary - 2821 S. Fees, demolished
- Martin Elementary - 2801 W. 27th, demolished, land is now Wildwood Park
- Martinson Elementary - 249 N. Athenian, converted into an apartment complex
- McCormick Elementary - 855 S. Martinson, now the McCormick School Museum
- Metro-Boulevard Alternative High School - 751 SE. George Washington Blvd, now a micro-mall with several businesses inside.
- Metro-Meridian Alternative High School - 301 S. Meridian, now a micro-mall with several businesses inside.
- Michener Elementary - 2235 W. 37th, now Catholic Charities
- Munger Elementary - 1150 S. Bluffview, demolished
- Murdock Elementary - 670 N. Edgemoor, demolished
- Riverview Elementary - 5355 N. Seneca, demolished
- Rogers Elementary - 3580 E. Sunnybrook, demolished
- Roosevelt Intermediate School - 2201 E. Douglas, now part of East High School
- Schweiter Elementary - 1400 SE. George Washington Dr, now New Hope Christian Church
- Sim Elementary - 611 W. 33rd, now part of South High School
- Skinner Elementary - 1640 E. 21st, demolished
- South Hillside Elementary - 2161 S. Hillside, now Calvary Chapel
- Sunnyside Elementary - 3003 E. Kellogg, converted into an apartment complex
- Waco Elementary - 2150 N. Waco, demolished
- Webster Elementary - 640 N. Emporia, soon to be offices and classes for Music Theatre Wichita

== Notable alumni ==
Several figures of national prominence in their field are alumni of the Wichita Public Schools, including former U.S. Agriculture Secretary and Kansas 4th District Congressman Dan Glickman (later Director of Harvard's Kennedy School of Government and Motion Picture Association of America president), actress Kirstie Alley, and actor Don Johnson.

Various Olympic medalists began their athletic careers in the Wichita Public Schools, including basketball star Lynette Woodard, track star Jim Ryun, swimmer Jeff Farrell, and boxer Nico Hernandez.

Among those who publicly credit their Wichita public school education for some of their success are former CIA director and U.S. Defense Secretary (under Presidents G.W. Bush & B. Obama) Robert Gates, Broadway theater and Metropolitan Opera star Karla Burns, and Heisman Trophy winner and member of the Pro Football Hall of Fame Barry Sanders.

== See also ==
- Kansas State Department of Education
- Kansas State High School Activities Association
- List of high schools in Kansas
- List of unified school districts in Kansas
