= Hayden High School (Topeka, Kansas) =

Hayden Catholic High School
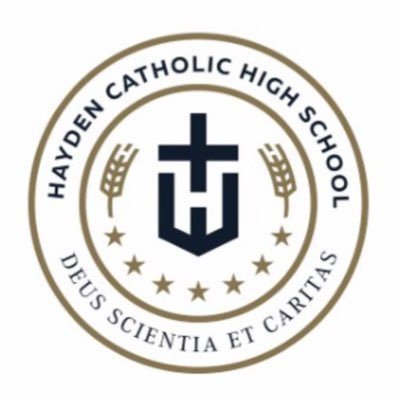
- The Seal of Hayden Catholic High School

Location
- 401 SW Gage Boulevard; Topeka, Shawnee, Kansas 66606; United States
- Coordinates: 39°3′42.1″N 95°43′34.74″W

Information
- Type: Private, coeducational
- Motto: Deus Scientia et Caritas (God is Knowledge and Love)
- Religious affiliation: Christianity
- Denomination: Roman Catholic
- Established: 1911
- Authority: Roman Catholic Archdiocese of Kansas City in Kansas
- President: Shelly Buhler
- Principal: James Sandstrom
- Chaplain: Fr. Thomas Maddock
- Grades: 9–12
- Student to teacher ratio: 15:1
- Colors: Navy, White, and Gold
- Slogan: Enter to Learn, Leave to Serve
- Fight song: Hayden Fight Song
- Athletics: Class 4A
- Athletics conference: Centennial League
- Mascot: Wildcat
- Team name: Hayden Wildcats
- Rival: Seaman High School; Washburn Rural High School
- Accreditation: North Central Association of Colleges and Schools
- Newspaper: The Capitolite
- Affiliation: Kansas State High School Activities Association
- Website: haydencatholic.org

Hayden Catholic High School is in Topeka, Kansas, United States. It is located in the Roman Catholic Archdiocese of Kansas City in Kansas.

== Extracurricular activities ==
=== Athletics ===
Athletic teams are called the Wildcats and compete at the 4A level within the Kansas State High School Activities Association. Throughout Hayden's history, the athletic programs have won several state championships.

==== Football ====
The Wildcats, who had been runners-up in the previous year, defeated Perry-Lecompton High School 42–21 in football, winning their third state championship (two undefeated teams in 1998 and 2004).

==== Boys' basketball ====
Hayden has had much success in boys' basketball, winning eight state titles in the Kansas 4A classification. State titles were won in 1982, 1983, 1987, 1990, 1991, 1993, 2008, and 2018.

=== State championships ===
State Championships
Season	Sport	Number of Championships	Year
Fall	Football	3	1998, 2004, 2008
Fall	Golf, Girls	7	2008, 2009, 2013, 2017, 2018, 2023, 2024
Fall	Cross Country, Boys	6	1975, 1981, 1982, 1990, 1992, 1995
Fall	Cross Country, Girls	7	1986, 1989, 1990, 1992, 1993, 1994, 2012
Fall	Soccer, Boys	2	2000, 2012
Fall	Volleyball	5	2007, 2015, 2016, 2017, 2019
Winter	Basketball, Boys	8	1982, 1983, 1987, 1990, 1991, 1993, 2008, 2018
Winter	Basketball, Girls	4	1992, 1993, 1995, 2004
Winter	Bowling, Boys	1	2025
Winter	Tennis, Girls	2	2022, 2024
Spring	Golf, Boys	4	2001, 2008, 2011, 2014
Spring	Track and Field, Girls	2	1989, 1995
Spring	Baseball	7	1996, 1997, 2001, 2009, 2013, 2015, 2024
Spring	Soccer, Girls	3	2012, 2013, 2015
Spring	Softball	3	1999, 2001, 2002
Spring	Tennis, Boys	4	2004, 2005, 2014, 2019
Total		65	

== Notable alumni ==
- Margaret Thompson Murdock, member of the U.S. Shooting Hall of Fame and the Kansas Sports Hall of Fame; first woman to win a medal in shooting at the Summer Olympics
- Desmond Purnell, college football linebacker for the Kansas State Wildcats
- Mark Turgeon, former head basketball coach for the Maryland Terrapins
