= Wichita State University Campus of Applied Sciences and Technology =

Public technical college based in Wichita, Kansas, US

WSU Tech
- Type: Technical college
- Established: 1965
- Parent institution: Wichita State University
- Affiliations: Kansas Board of Regents
- Chancellor: Richard Muma
- President: Sheree Utash
- Students: 6,637 (fall 2026); 18,003 (Main campus, fall 2026)
- Location: Wichita, Kansas, United States; 37°43′09″N 97°17′35″W
- Colors: Black and yellow
- Website: wsutech.edu

Wichita State University Campus of Applied Sciences and Technology (WSU Tech and previously the Wichita Area Technical College) is a public technical college in Wichita, Kansas, United States. It was known as the Wichita Area Technical College before its affiliation with Wichita State University. WSU Tech is accredited by the Higher Learning Commission, coordinated by the Kansas Board of Regents (KBOR), and governed by the Sedgwick County Technical Education and Training Authority Board (SCTETA). WSU Tech operates four different campuses throughout the metropolitan area of Wichita. Its main campus is the National Center for Aviation Training (NCAT).

== History ==
Year	Event
1995	Senate bill 257 was passed and signed by the governor authorizing the transition of Wichita Area Vocational-Technical School to Wichita Area Technical College (WATC) and gave the college the authority to grant college credit and award the associate of applied science degree.
1999	State supervisory jurisdiction over WATC was changed from the Kansas State Board of Education to the Kansas Board of Regents with the passage of Senate bill 345.
2000	An ad hoc task force, appointed by the Wichita Public Schools Superintendent, developed and presented Keys to Success, a list of the desired characteristics of a world-class technical college.; WATC received Candidacy status with the Council on Occupational Education. Camille Kluge was appointed president of the college.
2001	WATC received full accreditation from the Council on Occupational Education.
2002	The Kansas Board of Regents established a policy enabling all degree-granting institutions in Kansas to achieve accreditation from HLC-NCA. WATC began the research and planning necessary to accomplish this new requirement.
2003	The Kansas Legislature passed Senate bill 7, allowing all degree-granting institutions to be governed by a board independent from a K-12 school board and to develop a plan for transition.
2004	The WATC transition plan was approved by the local Wichita Public Schools Unified School District 259 (US$259) Board of Education (BOE) and the Kansas Board of Regents. WATC transitioned to an independent entity governed by a new nine-member Board of Trustees on July 1, 2004.; WATC suffered a loss of $3.5 million in funding from US$259 resulting in a reduction-in-force of 59 positions and 12 programs.; Sedgwick County Board of County Commissioners approved a resolution creating a Sedgwick County Technical Education and Training Authority.; The Preliminary Information Form seeking HLC-NCA accreditation was prepared and submitted to HLCNCA.
2005	WATC Board of Trustees expanded to 11 members.
2006	WATC received candidacy status with HLC-NCA.; Camille Kluge resigned. Jim Means was appointed interim president.; Plans for a new campus were announced by the Sedgwick County Board of County Commissioners.; WATC was named the managing partner for the new facility.
2007	The Sedgwick County Technical Education and Training Authority became the governing board for WATC.; Peter Gustaf was appointed president.; Twenty-nine full-time equivalents were eliminated to redirect funds for instructional priorities.
2010	The National Center for Aviation Training opens at 4004 North Webb Road, Wichita, KS, near Jabara Airport.
2012	Wichita Area Technical College was awarded $13 million Department of Labor grant and chosen to facilitate the National Aviation Consortium (NAC) as the head institution in partnership with four colleges to develop a nationally recognized curriculum and training standard.
2013	WATC was the only state college in the Wichita area with fall enrollment growth, reaching 2,935 students.
2015	Agreement between WATC and WSU creates a joint Associate of Arts degree – called Shocker Pathway – to assist students who want to begin their coursework at WATC and finish their AA degree, or beyond, at WSU.
2018	Affiliation between WATC and WSU was approved by the Higher Learning Commission. WATC will become Wichita State University Campus of Applied Sciences and Technology, known informally as WSU Tech for short. Official changes will come into effect starting July 1, 2018.
2021	Robotics program named one of the three inaugural academic programs in the United States endorsed by Advanced Robotics for Manufacturing, a consortium created through a Department of Defense grant won by Carnegie Mellon University.
