= McPherson High School =

Location
- 801 East 1st Street; McPherson, Kansas 67460; United States; 38°22′44″N 97°39′17″W

Information
- School type: Public, High School
- School district: McPherson USD 418
- CEEB code: 171965
- Principal: Audrey Herbst
- Faculty: 53.45 (FTE)
- Grades: 9th to 12th
- Gender: coed
- Enrollment: 692 (2023-2024)
- Student to teacher ratio: 12.95
- Colors: Red & White
- Mascot: Bullpups
- Rival: Newton High School; Buhler High School
- Website: McPherson High School

McPherson High School is a public high school for grades 9–12 in McPherson, Kansas, United States. It is operated by McPherson USD 418 school district. Each grade has an average of 200 to 300 students.

== Notable alumni ==
- Brad Underwood (Class of 1982) head coach of Illinois men's basketball team
- Steve Henson (Class of 1986) former NBA basketball player and current head coach of University of Texas at San Antonio
- Jonathan Coachman (Class of 1990) former WWE commentator and ESPN broadcaster
- Marlies Gipson (Class of 2005) former WNBA basketball player.
- V. John Krehbiel, US Ambassador to Finland
- Tanner Hawkinson (Class of 2008) retired NFL player
