= List of high schools in Kansas =

This is a list of high schools in the state of Kansas, grouped by county.

== Allen County ==
- Humboldt High School, Humboldt, USD 258
- Iola High School, Iola, USD 257
- Marmaton Valley High School, Moran, USD 256

== Anderson County ==
- Anderson County Jr/Sr High School, Garnett, USD 365
- Crest High School, Colony, USD 479

== Atchison County ==
- Atchison County Community High School, Effingham, USD 377
- Atchison High School, Atchison, USD 409
- Maur Hill - Mount Academy, Atchison, Private

== Barber County ==
- Medicine Lodge High School, Medicine Lodge, USD 254
- South Barber High School, Kiowa, USD 255

== Barton County ==
- Central Plains High School, Claflin, USD 112
- Ellinwood High School, Ellinwood, USD 355
- Great Bend High School, Great Bend, USD 428
- Hoisington High School, Hoisington, USD 431

== Bourbon County ==
- Fort Scott High School, Fort Scott, USD 234
- Uniontown High School, Uniontown, USD 235
- Christian Learning Center, Fort Scott, Private
- Fort Scott Christian Heights, Fort Scott, Private

== Brown County ==
- Hiawatha High School, Hiawatha, USD 415
- Horton High School, Horton, USD 430
- Kickapoo Nation School, Powhattan, Private

== Butler County ==
- Andover Central High School, USD 385
- Andover High School, USD 385
- Augusta High School, Augusta, USD 402
- Bluestem High School, Leon, USD 205
- Circle High School, Towanda, USD 375
- Douglass High School, Douglass, USD 396
- El Dorado High School, El Dorado, USD 490
- Flinthills High School, Rosalia, USD 492
- Frederic Remington High School, Whitewater, USD 206
- Rose Hill High School, Rose Hill, USD 394
- Berean Academy, Elbing, Private

== Chase County ==
- Chase County Junior/Senior High School, Cottonwood Falls, USD 284

== Chautauqua County ==
- Cedar Vale High School, Cedar Vale, USD 285
- Sedan High School, Sedan, USD 286

== Cherokee County ==
- Baxter Springs High School, Baxter Springs, USD 508
- Columbus High School, Columbus, USD 493
- Galena High School, Galena, USD 499
- Riverton High School, Riverton, USD 404

== Cheyenne County ==
- Cheylin West Junior/Senior High School, Bird City, USD 103
- St. Francis High School, St. Francis, USD 297

== Clark County ==
- Ashland High School, Ashland, USD 220
- Minneola High School, Minneola, USD 219

== Clay County ==
- Clay Center Community High School, Clay Center, USD 379
- Wakefield High School, Wakefield, USD 379

== Cloud County ==
- Clifton-Clyde Senior High School, Clyde, USD 224
- Concordia Junior-Senior High School, Concordia, USD 333

== Coffey County ==
- Lebo Junior-Senior High School, Lebo, USD 243
- Waverly High School, Waverly, USD 243
- Burlington High School, Burlington, USD 244
- Southern Coffey County High School, LeRoy, USD 245

== Comanche County ==
- South Central High School, Coldwater, USD 300

== Cowley County ==
- Arkansas City High School, Arkansas City, USD 470
- Central Junior-Senior High School, Burden, USD 462
- Dexter High School, Dexter, USD 471
- Udall High School, Udall, USD 463
- Winfield High School, Winfield, USD 465

== Crawford County ==
- Frontenac Junior/Senior High School, Frontenac, USD 249
- Girard High School, Girard, USD 248
- Northeast High School, Arma, USD 246
- Southeast High School, Cherokee, USD 247
- Pittsburg High School, Pittsburg, USD 250
- St. Mary's-Colgan High School, Pittsburg, Private

== Decatur County ==
- Decatur Community Junior/Senior High School, Oberlin, USD 294

== Dickinson County ==
- Abilene High School, Abilene, USD 435
- Chapman High School, Chapman, USD 473
- Herington High School, Herington, USD 487
- Hope High School, Hope, USD 481
- Solomon High School, Solomon, USD 393
- Abilene Baptist Academy, Abilene, Private

== Doniphan County ==
- Doniphan West High School, Highland (formerly Midway and Highland High Schools)
- Troy High School, Troy
- Riverside High School, Wathena (Merger of Wathena and Elwood)

== Douglas County ==
- Baldwin High School, Baldwin City, USD 348
- Eudora High School, Eudora, USD 491
- Lawrence Free State High School, Lawrence, USD 497
- Lawrence High School, Lawrence, USD 497
- Bishop Seabury Academy, Lawrence, Private
- Veritas Christian School, Lawrence, Private

== Edwards County ==
- Kinsley Junior-Senior High School, Kinsley

== Elk County ==
- Elk Valley High School, Longton, USD 283
- West Elk High School, Howard, USD 282

== Ellis County ==
- Ellis High School, Ellis, USD 388
- Hays High School, Hays, USD 489
- Victoria High School, Victoria, USD 432
- Thomas More Prep-Marian, Hays, Private

== Ellsworth County ==
- Ellsworth High School, Ellsworth, USD 327
- Wilson High School, Wilson, USD 112

== Finney County ==
- Garden City High School, Garden City, USD 457
- Holcomb High School, Holcomb, USD 363

== Ford County ==
- Bucklin High School, Bucklin, USD 459
- Dodge City High School, Dodge City, USD 443
- Spearville Junior/Senior High School, Spearville, USD 381

== Franklin County ==
- Central Heights High School, Richmond, USD 288
- Ottawa High School, Ottawa, USD 290
- Wellsville High School, Wellsville, USD 289
- West Franklin High School, Pomona, USD 287 (consolidation of Pomona and Williamsburg High Schools)

== Geary County ==
- Junction City High School, Junction City, USD 475
- St. Xavier High School, Junction City, Private

== Gove County ==
- Quinter Junior-Senior High School, Quinter, USD 293
- Wheatland High School, Grainfield, USD 291

== Graham County ==
- Hill City High School, Hill City, USD 281

== Grant County ==
- Ulysses High School, Ulysses, USD 214

== Gray County ==
- Cimarron High School, Cimarron, USD 102
- Ingalls High School, Ingalls, USD 477
- South Gray High School, Montezuma, USD 371

== Greeley County ==
- Greeley County High School, Tribune, USD 200

== Greenwood County ==
- Eureka High School, Eureka, USD 389
- Hamilton High School, Hamilton, USD 390
- Madison High School, Madison, USD 386

== Hamilton County ==
- Syracuse High School, Syracuse, USD 494

== Harper County ==
- Attica High School, Attica, USD 511
- Chaparral High School, Anthony, USD 361

== Harvey County ==
- Burrton High School, Burrton, USD 369
- Halstead High School, Halstead, USD 440
- Hesston High School, Hesston, USD 460
- Newton High School, Newton, USD 373
- Sedgwick High School, Sedgwick, USD 439

== Haskell County ==
- Satanta Junior-Senior High School, Satanta, USD 507
- Sublette High School, Sublette, USD 374

== Hodgeman County ==
- Hodgeman County High School, Jetmore, USD 227

== Jackson County ==
- Royal Valley High School, Hoyt, USD 337
- Holton High School, Holton, USD 336
- Jackson Heights High School, Holton, USD 335

== Jefferson County ==
- Jefferson County North High School, Winchester, USD 339
- Jefferson West High School, Meriden, USD 340
- McLouth High School, McLouth, USD 342
- Oskaloosa High School, Oskaloosa, USD 341
- Perry-Lecompton High School, Perry, USD 343
- Valley Falls High School, Valley Falls, USD 338

== Jewell County ==
- Rock Hills High School, Mankato, USD 107

== Johnson County ==
- Gardner Edgerton High School, Gardner, USD 231
- De Soto High School, De Soto, USD232
- Mill Valley High School, Shawnee, USD 232
- Bishop Miege High School, Roeland Park, Private
- Kansas City Christian School, Prairie Village, Private
- Shawnee Mission Christian School, Westwood, Private
- Christ Preparatory Academy, Lenexa, Private
- St. James Academy, Lenexa, Private
- Maranatha Christian Academy, Shawnee, Private
- Midland Adventist Academy, Shawnee, Private

=== Olathe ===
- Olathe East High School, Olathe, USD 233
- Olathe North High School, Olathe, USD 233
- Olathe Northwest High School, Olathe, USD 233
- Olathe South High School, Olathe, USD 233
- Olathe West High School, Olathe, USD 233
- Kansas School for the Deaf, Olathe, Private

=== Overland Park ===
==== USD 229 ====
- Blue Valley High School, Overland Park, USD 229
- Blue Valley North High School, Overland Park, USD 229
- Blue Valley Northwest High School, Overland Park, USD 229
- Blue Valley West High School, Overland Park, USD 229
- Blue Valley Southwest High School, Overland Park, USD 229
- Blue Valley Academy, Overland Park, USD 229

==== USD 512 ====
- Shawnee Mission East High School, Prairie Village, USD 512
- Shawnee Mission North High School, Overland Park, USD 512
- Shawnee Mission Northwest High School, Shawnee, USD 512
- Shawnee Mission South High School, Overland Park, USD 512
- Shawnee Mission West High School, Overland Park, USD 512
- Horizons High School, Mission, USD 512

==== Private ====
- Hyman Brand Hebrew Academy, Overland Park, Private
- Overland Christian Schools, Overland Park, Private
- Saint Thomas Aquinas High School, Overland Park, Private

== Kearny County ==
- Deerfield High School, Deerfield, USD 216
- Lakin High School, Lakin, USD 215

== Kingman County ==
- Cunningham High School, Cunningham, USD 332
- Kingman High School, Kingman, USD 331
- Norwich High School, Norwich, USD 331

== Kiowa County ==
- Kiowa County High School, Greensburg, USD 422

== Labette County ==
- Chetopa High School, Chetopa, USD 505
- Labette County High School, Altamont, USD 506
- Oswego Junior-Senior High School, Oswego, USD 504
- Parsons Senior High School, Parsons, USD 503

== Lane County ==
- Dighton High School, Dighton, USD 482

== Leavenworth County ==
- Basehor-Linwood High School, Basehor, USD 458
- Lansing High School, Lansing, USD 469
- Leavenworth High School, Leavenworth, USD 453
- Pleasant Ridge High School, Easton, USD 449
- Tonganoxie High School, Tonganoxie, USD 464

== Lincoln County ==
- Lincoln Junior/Senior High School, Lincoln, USD 298
- Sylvan Unified High School, Sylvan Grove, USD 299

== Linn County ==
- Jayhawk-Linn High School, Mound City, USD 346
- Pleasanton High School, Pleasanton, USD 344
- Prairie View High School, La Cygne, USD 362

== Logan County ==
- Oakley High School, Oakley, USD 274
- Triplains High School, Winona, USD 275

== Lyon County ==
- Emporia High School, Emporia, USD 253
- Northern Heights High School, Allen, USD 251
- Hartford High School, Hartford, USD 252
- Olpe Junior-Senior High School, Olpe, USD 252

== Marion County ==
- Centre High School, Lost Springs, USD 397
- Goessel High School, Goessel, USD 411
- Hillsboro High School, Hillsboro, USD 410
- Marion High School, Marion, USD 408
- Peabody-Burns Junior/Senior High School, Peabody, USD 398

== Marshall County ==
- Axtell High School, Axtell, USD 113
- Frankfort High School, Frankfort, USD 380
- Marysville Junior/Senior High School, Marysville, USD 364
- Valley Heights Jr/Sr High School, Blue Rapids, USD 498

== McPherson County ==
- Canton-Galva High School, Canton, USD 419
- Inman Junior/Senior High School, Inman, USD 448
- Moundridge High School, Moundridge, USD 423
- Smoky Valley High School, Lindsborg, USD 400
- McPherson High School, McPherson, USD 418
- Elyria Christian School, McPherson, Private

== Meade County ==
- Fowler High School, Fowler, USD 225
- Meade High School, Meade, USD 226

== Miami County ==
- Louisburg High School, Louisburg, USD 416
- Osawatomie High School, Osawatomie, USD 367
- Paola High School, Paola, USD 368
- Spring Hill High School, Spring Hill, USD 230

== Mitchell County ==
- Beloit Junior-Senior High School, Beloit, USD 273
- St. John's Catholic High School, Beloit, Private
- Tipton Catholic High School, Tipton, Private

== Montgomery County ==
- Caney Valley High School, Caney, USD 436
- Cherryvale Middle-High School, Cherryvale, USD 447
- Field Kindley High School, Coffeyville, USD 445
- Independence High School, Independence, USD 446
- Tyro Community Christian School, Tyro, Private
- Independence Bible School, Independence, Private

== Morris County ==
- Council Grove High School, Council Grove, USD 417
- White City High School, White City, USD 481

== Morton County ==
- Elkhart High School, Elkhart, USD 218
- Rolla High School, Rolla, USD 217

== Nemaha County ==
- Centralia High School, Centralia, USD 380
- Nemaha Central High School, Seneca, USD 115
- Sabetha High School, Sabetha, USD 113

== Neosho County ==
- Chanute High School, Chanute, USD 413
- Erie High School, Erie, USD 101
- St. Paul High School, St. Paul, USD 505

== Ness County ==
- Ness City High School, Ness City, USD 303
- Western Plains High School, Ransom, USD 106

== Norton County ==
- Northern Valley High School, Almena, USD 212
- Norton High School, Norton, USD 211

== Osage County ==
- Burlingame High School, Burlingame, USD 454
- Lyndon High School, Lyndon, USD 421
- Marais des Cygnes Valley High School, Melvern, USD 456
- Osage City High School, Osage City, USD 420
- Santa Fe Trail High School, Carbondale, USD 434

== Osborne County ==
- Lakeside High School, Downs, USD 272
- Natoma High School, Natoma, USD 399
- Osborne High School, Osborne, USD 392

== Ottawa County ==
- Minneapolis High School, Minneapolis, USD 239
- Bennington High School, Bennington, USD 240
- Tescott High School, Tescott, USD 240

== Pawnee County ==
- Larned High School, Larned, USD 495
- Pawnee Heights High School, Rozel, USD 496

== Phillips County ==
- Logan High School, Logan, USD 326
- Phillipsburg High School, Phillipsburg, USD 325

== Pottawatomie County ==
- Rock Creek Junior/Senior High School, St. George, USD 323
- Onaga Senior High School, Onaga, USD 322
- St. Marys High School, St. Marys, USD 321
- Wamego High School, Wamego, USD 320

== Pratt County ==
- Pratt High School, Pratt, USD 382
- Skyline High School, Pratt, USD 438

== Rawlins County ==
- Rawlins County High School, Atwood, USD 105

== Reno County ==
- Buhler High School, Buhler, USD 313
- Fairfield High School, Langdon, USD 310
- Haven High School, Haven, USD 312
- Hutchinson High School, Hutchinson, USD 308
- Nickerson High School, Nickerson, USD 309
- Pretty Prairie High School, Pretty Prairie, USD 311
- Central Christian School, Hutchinson, Private
- Trinity Catholic High School, Hutchinson, Private

== Republic County ==
- Republic County High School, Belleville, USD 109
- Pike Valley High School, Scandia, USD 426

== Rice County ==
- Chase High School, Chase, USD 401
- Little River High School, Little River, USD 444
- Lyons High School, Lyons, USD 405
- Sterling High School, Sterling, USD 376

== Riley County ==
- Blue Valley High School, Randolph, USD 384
- Manhattan High School West/East Campus, Manhattan, USD 383
- Riley County High School, Riley, USD 378

== Rooks County ==
- Palco High School, Palco, USD 269
- Plainville High School, Plainville, USD 270
- Stockton High School, Stockton, USD 271

== Rush County ==
- Lacrosse High School, Lacrosse, USD 395
- Otis-Bison High School, Otis, USD 403

== Russell County ==
- Russell High School, Russell, USD 407

== Saline County ==
- Ell-Saline High School, Brookville, USD 307
- Salina High School Central, Salina, USD 305
- Salina High School South, Salina, USD 305
- Southeast of Saline High School, Gypsum, USD 306
- Sacred Heart High School, Saline, Private

== Scott County ==
- Scott Community High School, Scott City, USD 466

== Sedgwick County ==
- Campus High School, Wichita, USD 261
- Haysville High School, Haysville, USD 261
- Cheney High School, Cheney, USD 268
- Clearwater High School, Clearwater, USD 264
- Derby High School, Derby, USD 260
- Valley Center High School, Valley Center, USD 262
- Eisenhower High School, Goddard, USD 265
- Goddard High School, Goddard, USD 265
- Maize High School, Maize, USD 266
- Maize South High School, Maize, USD 266
- Andale High School, Andale, USD 267
- Garden Plain High School, Garden Plain, USD 267
- Sunrise Christian Academy, Bel Aire, Private

=== Wichita ===
==== Public ====
- Wichita East High School, Wichita, USD 259
- Wichita Heights High School, Wichita, USD 259
- Wichita North High School, Wichita, USD 259
- Wichita Northeast Magnet High School, Bel Aire, USD 259
- Wichita Northwest High School, Wichita, USD 259
- Wichita South High School, Wichita, USD 259
- Wichita Southeast High School, Wichita, USD 259
- Wichita West High School, Wichita, USD 259
- Chester I. Lewis Academic Learning Center, Wichita, USD 259
- Sowers Alternative High School, Wichita, USD 259

==== Private ====
- Annoor Islamic School, Wichita, Private
- Bishop Carroll Catholic High School, Wichita, Private
- Classical School of Wichita, Wichita, Private
- The Independent School, Wichita, Private
- Kapaun Mt. Carmel High School, Wichita, Private
- Life Preparatory Academy, Wichita, Private
- Trinity Academy, Wichita, Private
- Wichita Adventist Christian Academy, Wichita, Private
- Wichita Collegiate School, Wichita, Private

== Seward County ==
- Liberal High School, Liberal, USD 480
- Southwestern Heights Junior/Senior High School, Kismet, USD 483

== Shawnee County ==
- Rossville High School, Rossville, USD 321
- Shawnee Heights High School, Tecumseh, USD 450
- Silver Lake Junior-Senior High School, Silver Lake, USD 372

=== Topeka ===
==== Public ====
- Seaman High School, Topeka, USD 345
- Washburn Rural High School, Topeka, USD 437
- Highland Park High School, Topeka, USD 501
- Hope Street Academy, Topeka, USD 501
- Topeka High School, Topeka, USD 501
- Topeka West High School, Topeka, USD 501

==== Private ====
- Cair Paravel Latin School, Topeka, Private
- Hayden High School, Topeka, Private
- Heritage Christian School, Topeka, Private

== Sheridan County ==
- Hoxie High School, Hoxie, USD 412

== Sherman County ==
- Goodland High School, Goodland, USD 352

== Smith County ==
- Smith Center High School, Smith Center, USD 237
- Thunder Ridge High School, Kensington, USD 110

== Stafford County ==
- Macksville High School, Macksville, USD 351
- St. John-Hudson High School, St. John, USD 350
- Stafford Middle/High School, Stafford, USD 349

== Stanton County ==
- Stanton County High School, Johnson, USD 452

== Stevens County ==
- Hugoton High School, Hugoton, USD 210
- Moscow High School, Moscow, USD 209

== Sumner County ==
- Argonia High School, Argonia, USD 359
- Belle Plaine High School, Belle Plaine, USD 357
- Caldwell High School, Caldwell, USD 360
- Conway Springs High School, Conway Springs, USD 356
- Oxford Junior/Senior High School, Oxford, USD 358
- Mulvane High School, Mulvane, USD 263
- South Haven High School, South Haven, USD 509
- Wellington High School, Wellington, USD 353

== Thomas County ==
- Brewster High School, Brewster, USD 314
- Colby High School, Colby, USD 315
- Golden Plains High School, Rexford, USD 316

== Trego County ==
- Trego Community High School, Wakeeney, USD 208

== Wabaunsee County ==
- Mission Valley High School, Eskridge, USD 330
- Wabaunsee High School, Alma, USD 329

== Wallace County ==
- Wallace County High School, Sharon Springs, USD 241
- Weskan High School, Weskan, USD 242

== Washington County ==
- Washington County High School, Washington, USD 108
- Hanover High School, Hanover, USD 223
- Linn High School, Linn, USD 223

== Wichita County ==
- Wichita County High School, Leoti, USD 467

== Wilson County ==
- Altoona-Midway High School, Buffalo, USD 387
- Fredonia High School, Fredonia, USD 484
- Neodesha High School, Neodesha, USD 461

== Woodson County ==
- Yates Center High School, Yates Center, USD 366

== Wyandotte County ==
- Bonner Springs High School, Bonner Springs, USD 204
- Piper High School, Piper, USD 203

=== Kansas City ===
==== Public ====
- Turner High School, Kansas City, USD 202
- J. C. Harmon High School, Kansas City, USD 500
- F. L. Schlagle High School, Kansas City, USD 500
- Sumner Academy of Arts and Science, Kansas City, USD 500
- Washington High School, Kansas City, USD 500
- Wyandotte High School, Kansas City, USD 500

==== Private ====
- Bishop Ward High School, Kansas City, Private
- Kansas State School for the Blind (KSSB), Kansas City, Private

== See also ==
- List of unified school districts in Kansas
- Kansas State High School Activities Association
- Kansas State Department of Education
- Education in Kansas
