= Moe Werner =

American football coach

Biographical details
- Born: March 24, 1932; Spearville, Kansas, U.S.
- Died: March 24, 2003 (aged 71); Kansas City, Kansas, U.S.

Coaching career (HC unless noted)
- 1961–1963: St. Xavier HS (KS)
- 1964–1965: Bishop Ward HS (KS) (line)
- 1966–1976: Bishop Ward HS (KS) (assistant)
- 1977–1985: St. Mary of the Plains

Head coaching record
- Overall: 28–59–2 (college)

Maurice E. Werner (March 24, 1932 – March 24, 2003) was an American football coach. He served as the head football coach at St. Mary of the Plains College in Dodge City, Kansas from 1977 to 1985, compiling a record of 28–59–2. Before coming to St. Mary of the Plains in 1977, Werner was the head football coach at Bishop Ward High School in Kansas City, Kansas from 1966 to 1976, tallying a mark of 78–29–3. He was the head football coach St. Xavier High School in Junction City, Kansas for three seasons before being hired as line coach at Bishop Ward in May1964.

Werner was born March 24, 1932, in Spearville, Kansas. He died on March 24, 2003, at his home in Kansas City, Kansas.

== Head coaching record ==
=== College ===
| Year | Team | Overall | Conference | Standing | Bowl/playoffs |
|---|---|---|---|---|---|
St. Mary of the Plains Cavaliers (Kansas Collegiate Athletic Conference) (1977–1985)
| 1977 | St. Mary of the Plains | 0–7–2 | 0–6–2 | 8th | |
| 1978 | St. Mary of the Plains | 3–7 | 3–5 | T–6th | |
| 1979 | St. Mary of the Plains | 1–9 | 1–7 | 9th | |
| 1980 | St. Mary of the Plains | 6–4 | 6–2 | T–2nd | |
| 1981 | St. Mary of the Plains | 4–6 | 4–4 | 5th | |
| 1982 | St. Mary of the Plains | 1–9 | 1–8 | 9th | |
| 1983 | St. Mary of the Plains | 4–6 | 4–5 | 5th | |
| 1984 | St. Mary of the Plains | 4–6 | 4–5 | T–6th | |
| 1985 | St. Mary of the Plains | 5–5 | 4–5 | 6th | |
| St. Mary of the Plains: | | 28–59–2 | 27–47–2 | | |
| Total: | | 28–59–2 | | | |
