= Phillipsburg High School =

Phillipsburg High School may refer to one of several high schools in the United States:

- Phillipsburg High School (Kansas) — Phillipsburg, Kansas
- Phillipsburg High School (New Jersey) — Phillipsburg, New Jersey
- Phillipsburg Alternative Secondary High School — Phillipsburg, New Jersey
