= Holcomb USD 363 =

Public school district in Holcomb, Kansas

Address
- 305 Wiley Street Holcomb, Kansas, 67851; United States
- Coordinates: 37.9888°N 100.9872°W

District information
- Type: Public
- Grades: K to 12
- Schools: 4

Other information
- Website: usd363.com

Holcomb USD 363 is a public unified school district headquartered in Holcomb, Kansas, United States. The district includes the community of Holcomb and nearby rural areas.

== History ==
Effective July 1, 2018, Scott Myers became the superintendent. He was previously a superintendent of other districts and an employee of the Kansas State Department of Education.

In 2018, the leadership of Holcomb USD considered the construction of an indoor pool but decided against it.

The school district historically owned an apartment building.

== Schools ==
The school district operates the following schools:

- Holcomb High School
- Holcomb Middle School
- Holcomb Elementary School
- Wiley Elementary School

== See also ==
- Kansas State Department of Education
- Kansas State High School Activities Association
- List of high schools in Kansas
- List of unified school districts in Kansas
