= JLHS =

JLHS may refer to:

- Jackson Liberty High School, Jackson Township, New Jersey, United States
- James Lick High School, San Jose, California, United States
- James Logan High School, Union City, California, United States
- Jayhawk-Linn High School, Mound City, Kansas, United States
- Jinling High School, Nanjing, Jiangsu, China
- Jonathan Law High School, Milford, Connecticut, United States
- Juarez-Lincoln High School, Mission, Texas, United States
