= Rose Hill USD 394 =

Public school district in Rose Hill, Kansas

Address
- 104 N. Rose Hill Rd. Rose Hill, Kansas, 67133; United States
- Coordinates: 37°33′34″N 97°8′4″W

District information
- Type: Public
- Grades: K to 12
- Superintendent: Randal Chickadonz
- Schools: 4

Other information
- Website: usd394.com

Rose Hill USD 394 is a public unified school district headquartered in Rose Hill, Kansas, United States. The district includes the community of Rose Hill and nearby rural areas.

== Schools ==
The school district operates the following schools:

- Rose Hill High School
- Rose Hill Middle School
- Rose Hill Intermediate School
- Rose Hill Primary School

== See also ==
- List of high schools in Kansas
- List of unified school districts in Kansas
- Kansas State Department of Education
- Kansas State High School Activities Association
