= Veritas School =

Veritas School may refer to:

- Veritas School (Ridgeland, Mississippi)
- Veritas School (Newberg, Oregon)

== See also ==
- Veritas Christian School (Lawrence, Kansas)
- Veritas Academy (disambiguation)
