= Deerfield USD 216 =

Public school district in Deerfield, Kansas

Address
- 803 Beech St. Deerfield, Kansas, 67838; United States
- Coordinates: 37°58′52″N 101°8′13″W

District information
- Type: Public
- Grades: K to 12
- Schools: 2

Other information
- Website: usd216.org

Deerfield USD 216 is a public unified school district headquartered in Deerfield, Kansas, United States. The district includes the community of Deerfield and nearby rural areas.

== Schools ==
The school district operates the following schools:

- Deerfield Middle/High School
- Deerfield Elementary School

== See also ==
- Kansas State Department of Education
- Kansas State High School Activities Association
- List of high schools in Kansas
- List of unified school districts in Kansas
