= Silver Lake USD 372 =

Public school district in Silver Lake, Kansas

Coordinates: 39°06′12″N 95°51′10″W

Address
- 200 E. Lake St. Silver Lake, Kansas, 66539; United States

District information
- Type: Public
- Grades: PreK to 12
- Superintendent: Brad Womack

Other information
- Website: silverlakeschools.org

Silver Lake Jr/Sr High School

Location
- 200 E. Lake St. Silver Lake, Kansas 66539; USA

Information
- School type: Public, High School
- Principal: Ryan Luke
- Colors: Maroon; Gold
- Nickname: Silver Lake Eagles
- Website: School Website

Silver Lake Elementary School

Location
- 200 Rice Rd. Silver Lake, Kansas 66539; USA

Information
- School type: Public, Elementary School
- Principal: Ronda Pegram
- Website: School Website

Silver Lake USD 372 is a public unified school district with headquarters in Silver Lake, Kansas, United States. The district includes the communities of Silver Lake, Kiro, and nearby rural areas.

== History ==
In 1911, a new six room brick school building replaced the original two room structure and the first high school class was organized.

In 1928, that building became the elementary school.

In 1952, the high school was burned. A new high school was built and completed in 1953.

In 1961, a new elementary school was completed.

In 1994, a sizeable addition was made to the existing high school; including a new gym, locker room facilities, and classrooms. The middle school grades 7 and 8 were moved to the same building as the high school. The elementary/middle school building which was previously grades 3-8 became the place for grades 1–6. The old elementary building (the original high school building from 1911), which had been for Kinder through grade 2, became preschool and Kindergarten only.

In 2008, a new gym was built at the elementary school. It is three times the size of the original gym.

In 2010, USD 372 suffered major spending cuts, which included the art program, teachers, lunches, etc.

== District ==
The superintendent for USD 372 is Brad Womack.

== High school ==
The principal of the high school is Ryan Luke.

=== State championships ===
Silver Lake High School only hangs a single banner for each sport with its list of state titles. The eight banners hanging in the high school gymnasium list the 70 Academic and Athletic State titles won in team competition.

==== Academics ====
Silver Lake High School has claimed 18 Academic team titles.

Debate:

The high school debate team won the Kansas State 3-2-1A 4-Speaker Tournament in 1996, 2013, 2014, 2018, and 2024. They also won the Kansas State 3-2-1A 2-Speaker Tournament in 1996, 1997, 2004, 2007, and 2013. Former coach Gail Naylor lead the school to seven of those championships, and current coach Michelle Taylor is responsible for the recent 4-speaker victories in 2014, 2018, and 2024.

Speech:

Silver Lake had a remarkably successful speech team throughout the 1990s and 2000s, with championship teams in 1994, 1998, and 1999. The speech team dominated 3A competition in Kansas when they won four consecutive state championships in 2001, 2002, 2003, and 2004, marking the second most championships in a row that a Silver Lake program has had.

==== Athletics ====
Silver Lake High School has claimed a total of 54 Kansas State Athletic Championships.

Football:

The Silver Lake Eagles football team has made 18 appearances at the Kansas State 3A Football Championship including wins in 1981, 1984, 1989, 1991, 1997, 2006, 2010, and 2013.

Basketball:

The only time the boys' basketball won the state championship was in 1981. However, the Lady Eagles have won multiple championships including in 1983, 1984, 1988, 2002, 2012, 2016, and 2024.

Volleyball:

Silver Lake's Lady Eagles have won seven state championships in volleyball (1998, 2003, 2004, 2006, 2007, 2013, 2014, 2016, and 2018).

Baseball:

The first state championship ever won by the Silver Lake Eagles was for baseball in 1953. Coincidentally, the Eagles won the championship the next year in 1954, marking the first back-to-back state championships for Silver Lake. Silver Lake subsequently won the 3A State Baseball Championships thirteen more times in 1970, 1974, 1977, 1978, 1980, 1982, 1996, 1997, 1998, 2005, 2008, 2009, and 2011.

Softball:

12 state Championships have been won by the Lady Eagles Softball team since 1992 (including a 5-peat from 1992-1996, the longest stretch of repeat champions by a Silver Lake program): 1992, 1993, 1994, 1995, 1996, 1999, 2004, 2005, 2009, 2013, 2014, 2015, and 2018.

Golf:

Only 1 state championship has been won for any Silver Lake Golf teams. The girls golf team won in 2023.

== Elementary school ==
The principal of the elementary school is Ronda Pegram.

The elementary school team has also received titles for youth competitions and other events.

== See also ==
- Kansas State Department of Education
- Kansas State High School Activities Association
- List of high schools in Kansas
- List of unified school districts in Kansas
