= Cedar Vale High School =

Kansan high school

Coordinates: 37.1059°N 96.5009°W

Cedar Vale High School is a public secondary school in Cedar Vale, Kansas, United States. It is located at 500 Dora Street, and operated by Cedar Vale USD 285 school district. Its mascot is a bronco and the school colors are purple and gold. The school competes in the South Central Border league as part of a co-op with Dexter High School. The co-op calls its teams the Spartans.

== See also ==
- List of high schools in Kansas
- List of unified school districts in Kansas
