= Holcomb High School =

Location
- 600 North Jones Avenue; Holcomb, Finney County, Kansas 67851-0038; United States
- Coordinates: 37.993123°N 100.992233°W

Information
- Type: Public high school
- School board: 7
- School district: Holcomb USD 363
- NCES District ID: 2007350
- Educational authority: Kansas State Department of Education
- School code: KS-D0363-4518
- CEEB code: 171360
- NCES School ID: 200735000757
- Principal: Jerry Johnson
- Teaching staff: 26.24 (on an FTE basis)
- Grades: 9–12
- Gender: Coeducational
- Enrollment: 265 (2024–2025)
  - Grade 9: 62
  - Grade 10: 62
  - Grade 11: 81
  - Grade 12: 60
- Student to teacher ratio: 10.10
- Campus type: Rural: Distant
- Colors: Black and Orange
- Nickname: Longhorns
- Rivals: Lakin High School; Scott Community High School
- Feeder schools: Holcomb Middle School
- Affiliation: Kansas State High School Activities Association
- Website: usd363.com

Holcomb High School (HHS) is a public high school in Holcomb, Kansas, United States. Operated by Holcomb USD 363, the school enrolled 301 students in ninth grade to twelfth grade during the 2022–2023 school year.

== Curriculum ==
The school has implemented the "1-to-1 laptop initiative", which provides every student with a laptop for the school year. These laptops allow students to do assignments online as well as type papers, create videos, and accomplish other school-related tasks.

== Extracurricular activities ==
Holcomb High is a member of the Kansas State High School Activities Association and offers a limited variety of extracurricular activities. Extracurricular activities are also provided through performing arts, school publications, and clubs.

=== Athletics ===
Their athletic teams compete in the 3A Division and are known as the "Longhorns".

Fall
- Football
- Volleyball
- Boys Cross-Country
- Girls Cross-Country
- Girls Golf
- Cheerleading

Winter

- Boys Basketball
- Girls Basketball
- Wrestling
- Boys Bowling
- Girls Bowling
- Winter Cheerleading

Spring

- Baseball
- Boys Golf
- Softball
- Boys Track and Field
- Girls Track and Field

==== State championships ====
Holcomb has won several state championships in various sports as shown in the table below.

State Championships
Season	Sport	Number of Championships	Year
Fall	Cross Country, Boys	3	2001, 2008, 2009, 2025
Fall	Football	2	2015, 2017
Fall	Golf, Girls	1	2010
Winter	Basketball, Boys	4	1986, 1992, 2015, 2017
Spring	Track and Field, Boys	2	2007, 2025
Spring	Baseball	1	2017
Total		13	

== See also ==
- List of high schools in Kansas
- List of unified school districts in Kansas
