= Royal Valley High School =

Public secondary school

Coordinates: 39°14′42″N 95°42′21″W

Royal Valley High School is a public secondary school in Hoyt, Kansas, United States, and operated by Royal Valley USD 337 school district.

== Sports ==
The school colors are purple and white, and the mascot is the Panther. It is a part of the Big 7 League.

Royal Valley is home of the 1974 Boys 2A State Cross Country Champions, State 2a record in the mile by Ken Kelly at 4:10.19 in 1975 at Cessna Stadium in Wichita, Kansas before meters. The 2019 Girls 3A State Basketball Champions, and the 2019 3A State Volleyball Champions.

== See also ==
- List of high schools in Kansas
- List of unified school districts in Kansas
