= Silver Lake (Kansas) =

- Location within Kansas Location within the United States
- Location: Shawnee County, Kansas
- Coordinates: 39°06′05″N 95°51′46″W
- Lake type: natural freshwater oxbow lake
- Basin countries: United States
- Surface area: 14 acres (6 ha)
- Surface elevation: 896 ft (273 m)
- Settlements: Silver Lake, Kansas

Silver Lake is a lake on the west side of the town of Silver Lake, Kansas. It is about a half mile north of the Kansas River. Having an average surface area of 14-acre (57,000 m^{2}), it is one of the very few natural lakes in Kansas. It originally was a part of the Kansas River and was left as a lake when the river changed course in the nineteenth century or earlier. However, it is said to be fed by a spring in the lakebed. The lake is crescent-shaped. When the town of Silver Lake was founded in 1871, the lake already existed. Silver Lake is one of at least six oxbow lakes formed from the Kansas River.

Since the lakebed is mostly shallow, the surface area of Silver Lake can vary considerably. In a drought in the 1980s the lakebed all but dried up. During times of much rain the surface area of the lake can be at least 40-acre (160,000 m^{2}).

Silver Lake is a public lake, and boating and fishing are allowed. No swimming is permitted, and there is no public boat ramp, so boaters must obtain permission of landowners to launch boats. Almost the entire eastern side is bordered by business and residential buildings. The west side is bordered by crop fields.
