= Sherlock Township, Kansas =

Sherlock Township
- Township
- Location in Finney County
- Coordinates: 37°57′36″N 101°01′14″W
- Country: United States
- State: Kansas
- County: Finney

Area
  - Total: 162.03 sq mi (419.65 km^{2})
  - Land: 161.88 sq mi (419.27 km^{2})
  - Water: 0.15 sq mi (0.38 km^{2}) 0.09%
- Elevation: 3,000 ft (900 m)

Population (2020)
  - Total: 2,958
  - Density: 18.27/sq mi (7.055/km^{2})
- GNIS feature ID: 0471607

Sherlock Township is a township in Finney County, Kansas, United States. As of the 2020 census, its population was 2,958.

== Geography ==
Sherlock Township covers an area of 162.03 square miles (419.7 km^{2}) and contains one incorporated settlement, Holcomb. According to the USGS, it contains one cemetery, Toper.

== Transportation ==
Sherlock Township contains one airport or landing strip, L C Land Incorporated Airport.
