= Fredonia High School (Kansas) =

Location
- 916 Robinson; Fredonia, Kansas 66736; United States
- Coordinates: 37°31′39″N 95°49′25″W

Information
- School type: Public high school
- School district: Fredonia USD 484
- Principal: Brian Houghton
- Grades: 7–12
- Enrollment: 294 (2023-24)
- Colors: Yellow; Black
- Mascot: Yellowjacket
- Rival: Cherryvale High School; Neodesha High School
- Information: 620-378-4172
- Website: School Website

Fredonia High School is a public secondary school in Fredonia, Kansas, United States. It is the sole high school operated by Fredonia USD 484 school district, as well as Fredonia Middle School and Lincoln Elementary.

== See also ==
- List of high schools in Kansas
