= Labette County High School =

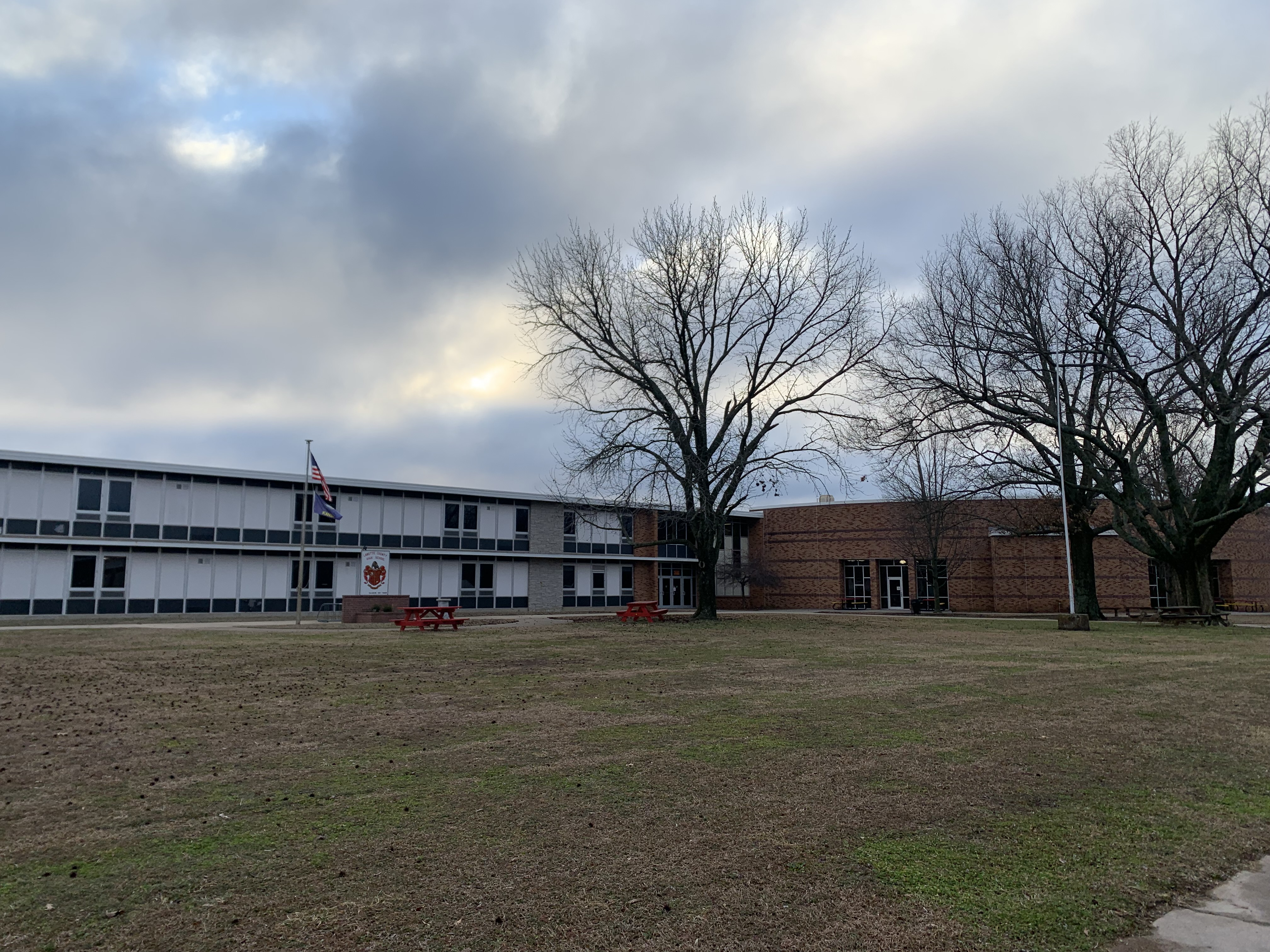
- Labette County High School (2026)

Location
- 601 South High School; Altamont, Kansas 67330; United States

Information
- School type: Public, High School
- School district: Labette County USD 506
- Principal: Stacy Smith
- Teaching staff: 28.90 (FTE)
- Gender: coed
- Enrollment: 507 (2023–2024)
- Student to teacher ratio: 17.54
- Campus type: Rural
- Color
- Team name: Grizzlies
- Website: School website

Labette County High School is a public high school in Altamont, Kansas, United States, operated by Labette County USD 506 school district. It is located at 601 South High School Street.

== History ==
The school was founded in 1895. In 1968, Look magazine did a feature story on the school.

== Overview ==
In 2026, the school's enrollment was about 480 students with approximately 15 percent categorized as minority. The Grizzlies are the school's mascot, and the school colors are red and gold. The Labetta is the school newspaper and the school also produces a podcast called the Labetta Encore. Extracurricular activities include chess club, math club, art club, cheer, and sports teams such as girls' golf.

== See also ==
- List of high schools in Kansas
- List of unified school districts in Kansas
