= Rose Hill High School =

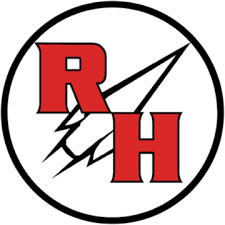

Location
- 104 N. Rose Hill Rd. Rose Hill, Kansas 67133; United States; 37.5497°N 97.1334°W

Information
- School type: Public, High School
- School district: Rose Hill USD 394
- CEEB code: 172605
- Principal: Aaron Jackson
- Teaching staff: 38.95 (FTE)
- Gender: coed
- Enrollment: 600 (2023-2024)
- Student to teacher ratio: 15.40
- Website: School Website

Rose Hill High School is a public high school in Rose Hill, Kansas, United States, and operated by Rose Hill USD 394 school district. The school's mascot is a rocket. The school colors are red and white. The school competes in the Ark Valley-Chisholm Trail league and is in Division IV.

== Extracurricular activities ==
The extracurricular activities offered at Rose Hill High School are small and limited due to the school's relatively small size. The sports teams compete in the 4A division, the third-largest classification in Kansas according to the Kansas State High School Activities Association. Rose Hill won a state championship in wrestling in 2024.

=== State championships ===
State Championships, Athletic
Season	Sport	Number of Championships	Year
Fall	Football	1	2011
Fall	Soccer, Boys	4	2014, 2015, 2025, 2026
Fall	Volleyball	2	2016, 2017
Winter	Basketball, Girls	1	1990
Winter	Wrestling, Boys	1	2024
Spring	Baseball	1	1947
Spring	Softball	1	1993
Spring	Track and Field, Girls	1	1988
Total		12	

State Championships, Non-Athletic
Season	Activity	Number of Championships	Year
Winter	Scholars Bowl	1	2015
Total		1	

== Notable alumni ==
- Kendall Gammon - Former NFL longsnapper and Kansas City Chiefs radio show host

== See also ==
- List of high schools in Kansas
- List of unified school districts in Kansas
