= Veritas Academy =

Veritas Academy may refer to:

- Veritas Academy (Austin, Texas)
- Veritas Academy (Florida)
- Veritas Preparatory Academy, Arizona

== See also ==
- Veritas School (disambiguation)
