= Appanoose Township, Kansas =

Appanoose Township
- Township
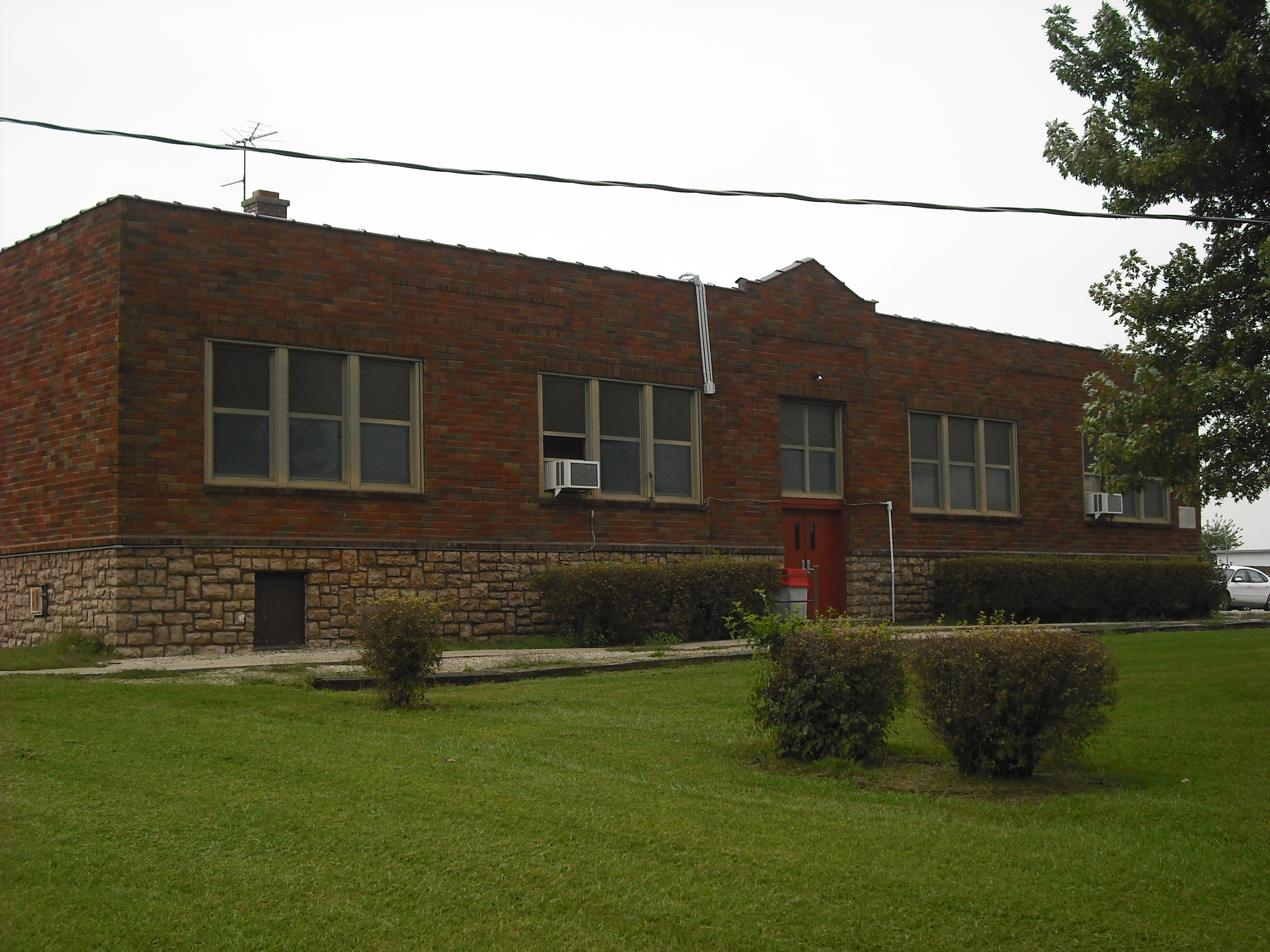
- Appanoose School, built in 1919, in Appanoose Township.

- Location in Franklin County
- Coordinates: 38°41′43″N 095°27′46″W
- Country: United States
- State: Kansas
- County: Franklin

Area
  - Total: 29.90 sq mi (77.45 km^{2})
  - Land: 29.87 sq mi (77.37 km^{2})
  - Water: 0.031 sq mi (0.08 km^{2}) 0.1%
- Elevation: 1,066 ft (325 m)

Population (2020)
  - Total: 344
  - Density: 11.5/sq mi (4.45/km^{2})
- GNIS feature ID: 0479327

Appanoose Township is a township in Franklin County, Kansas, United States. As of the 2020 census, its population was 344.

== Geography ==
Appanoose Township covers an area of 29.9 square miles (77 km^{2}) and contains no incorporated settlements. According to the USGS, it contains one cemetery, Dean.

The stream of East Appanoose Creek runs through this township.

== History ==
Appanoose was issued a post office in 1857. The post office was discontinued in 1860.

== Education ==
Appanoose Township High School was consolidated with Pomona High School in 1962. The Appanoose High School colors were red and white with the Indian as their mascot. The township still has an elementary school that is operated under West Franklin USD 287.
