= Greeley County High School =

Coordinates: 38.4726°N 101.7574°W

Location
- 400 W Lawrence; Tribune, KS 67879; United States

Information
- School type: Public high school
- School district: USD 200
- Teaching staff: 13.51 (FTE)
- Grades: 6-12
- Enrollment: 113 (2024–2025)
- Student to teacher ratio: 9.70
- Campus: Rural
- Colors: Red and White
- Mascot: Jackrabbit
- Website: School Website

Greeley County High School is a public high school in Tribune, Kansas serving Greeley County. The school mascot is the jackrabbit and the school colors are red and white. It is located at 400 West Larence Street.

Greeley County High School was authorized by the Kansas Legislature and secretary of state in 1895.

== See also ==
- List of high schools in Kansas
