= West Franklin High School =

Location
- 511 East Franklin Street; Pomona, Kansas 66076; United States; 38.609128°N 95.444902°W

Information
- School type: Public High School
- Established: 2007; 19 years ago
- Status: Open
- School board: BOE Website
- School district: USD 287
- CEEB code: 172409
- NCES School ID: 201080001869.
- Principal: Matthew Brenzikofer
- Staff: 34
- Teaching staff: 18.50 (FTE)
- Grades: 9–12
- Gender: coed
- Enrollment: 194 (2023-2024)
- Student to teacher ratio: 10.49
- Campus type: Rural
- Colors: Blue; Silver
- Athletics: KSHSAA
- Athletics conference: Flint Hills League
- Mascot: Falcons
- Team name: West Franklin Falcons
- Accreditation: Blue Ribbon 2013
- Newspaper: West Franklin VOICE
- Communities served: Pomona; Williamsburg
- Website: www.usd287.org/HSMS

West Franklin High School (WFHS) is a four-year public high school located in Pomona, Kansas, United States. It serves grades 9 through 12 and operated by West Franklin USD 287 public school disctrict. The school was established in 2007 with the merger of Williamsburg High School and Pomona High School. The school mascot is the Falcon and the school colors are blue and silver. Athletic teams compete in the Flint Hills League and are classified as a 3A school according to the KSHSAA.

== Administration ==
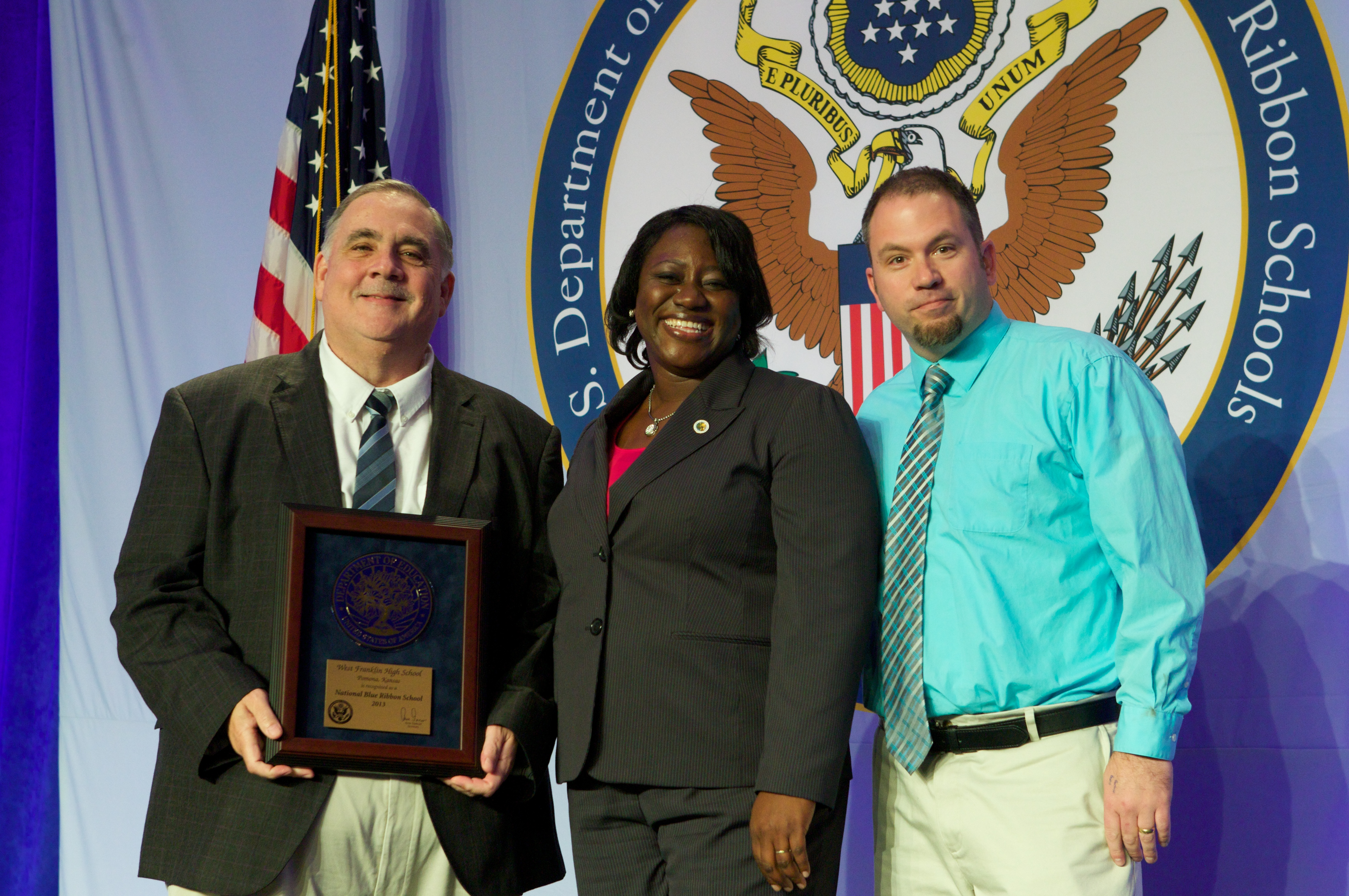
2013 National Blue Ribbon Schools winner

West Franklin High School is currently under the leadership of Principal Kelci Patterson.

== History ==
It was founded in 2007 with the merger of Williamsburg High School and Pomona High School. It is located at the former Pomona High School's site.

It is the only high school in West Franklin Unified School District 287

== Academics ==
In 2013, West Franklin High School was selected as a Blue Ribbon School. The Blue Ribbon Award recognizes public and private schools which perform at high levels or have made significant academic improvements.

== Extracurricular activities ==
West Franklin High School offers a variety of extracurricular activities for the students. The Falcons compete in the Flint Hills League and are classified as a 3A school, the third-largest classification in Kansas according to the Kansas State High School Activities Association.
The athletic teams are known as the "Falcons". A list of sports offered at the school is listed below:

=== Athletics ===
Fall Sports

- Fall Cheerleading
- Cross country
- Football
- Girls' Golf
- Volleyball

Winter Sports

- Basketball
- Winter Cheerleading
- Sapphire's Dance Team

Spring Sports

- Baseball
- Boys' Golf
- Softball
- Track and Field

== See also ==
- List of high schools in Kansas
- List of unified school districts in Kansas
