= Kendall Gammon =

American football player (born 1968)

No. 60, 62, 46, 86, 83
- Positions: Long snapper, Center

Personal information
- Born: October 23, 1968 (age 58); Wichita, Kansas, U.S.
- Listed height: 6 ft 4 in (1.93 m)
- Listed weight: 250 lb (113 kg)

Career information
- High school: Rose Hill (Rose Hill, Kansas)
- College: Pittsburg State (1988–1991)
- NFL draft: 1992: 11th round, 291st overall pick

Career history
- Pittsburgh Steelers (1992–1995); New Orleans Saints (1996–1999); Kansas City Chiefs (2000–2006)

Awards and highlights
- Pro Bowl (2004); NCAA D-II national champion (1991)

Career NFL statistics
- Games played: 234
- Total tackles: 8
- Stats at Pro Football Reference

Kendall Robert Gammon (born October 23, 1968) is an American former professional football player who was a long snapper and center for three teams in the National Football League (NFL). In 2004, Gammon was the first pure long snapper to be selected for the Pro Bowl. Gammon served as the analyst for the Kansas City Chiefs radio broadcasts until 2019.

== College career ==
Gammon attended Pittsburg State University, where he was a captain of the football team his junior and senior year. He played tight end, offensive tackle, guard and also handled the long snapping. In 1991, Gammon was a part of the team coached by Chuck Broyles that won the Division II National Championship.

== Professional career ==
Gammon was selected 291st overall in the 11th round of the 1992 NFL draft by the Pittsburgh Steelers. For the Steelers, he was the long snapper and backup center from 1992 to 1995.

After spending four years with the New Orleans Saints, Gammon signed with the Chiefs as a free agent in February 2000. He was named to the Pro Bowl in 2005 as a special teams player, long snapping for the AFC team. Gammon was the first pure long snapper to be selected for the Pro Bowl.

Gammon played in 218 consecutive games and appeared in Super Bowl XXX with the Pittsburgh Steelers in 1995.

== Post-football career ==
In January 2008, Gammon returned to Pittsburg State, in Pittsburg, Kansas. He serves as the university's Special Assistant to the President, External Relations.

Gammon was the co-owner of Paradise Nursery, a retail/wholesale distributor of nursery products in Kansas City, which was sold in 2013.

Gammon has written two books, Life's a Snap: Building on the Past to Improve Your Future (ISBN 978-0981557403) and Game Plan: Leadership Lessons from the Best of the NFL (ISBN 978-0981557410).

Gammon was on-air talent for the Chiefs Radio Network from 2008 to 2020, ending as the game color analyst following the retirement of Chiefs Pro Football Hall of Fame quarterback Len Dawson.

== Personal life ==
Gammon married his college sweetheart while attending Pittsburg State. His son Blaise graduated from Kansas State where he played tight end.
