= Silver Lake, Kansas =

City in Shawnee County, Kansas

- City
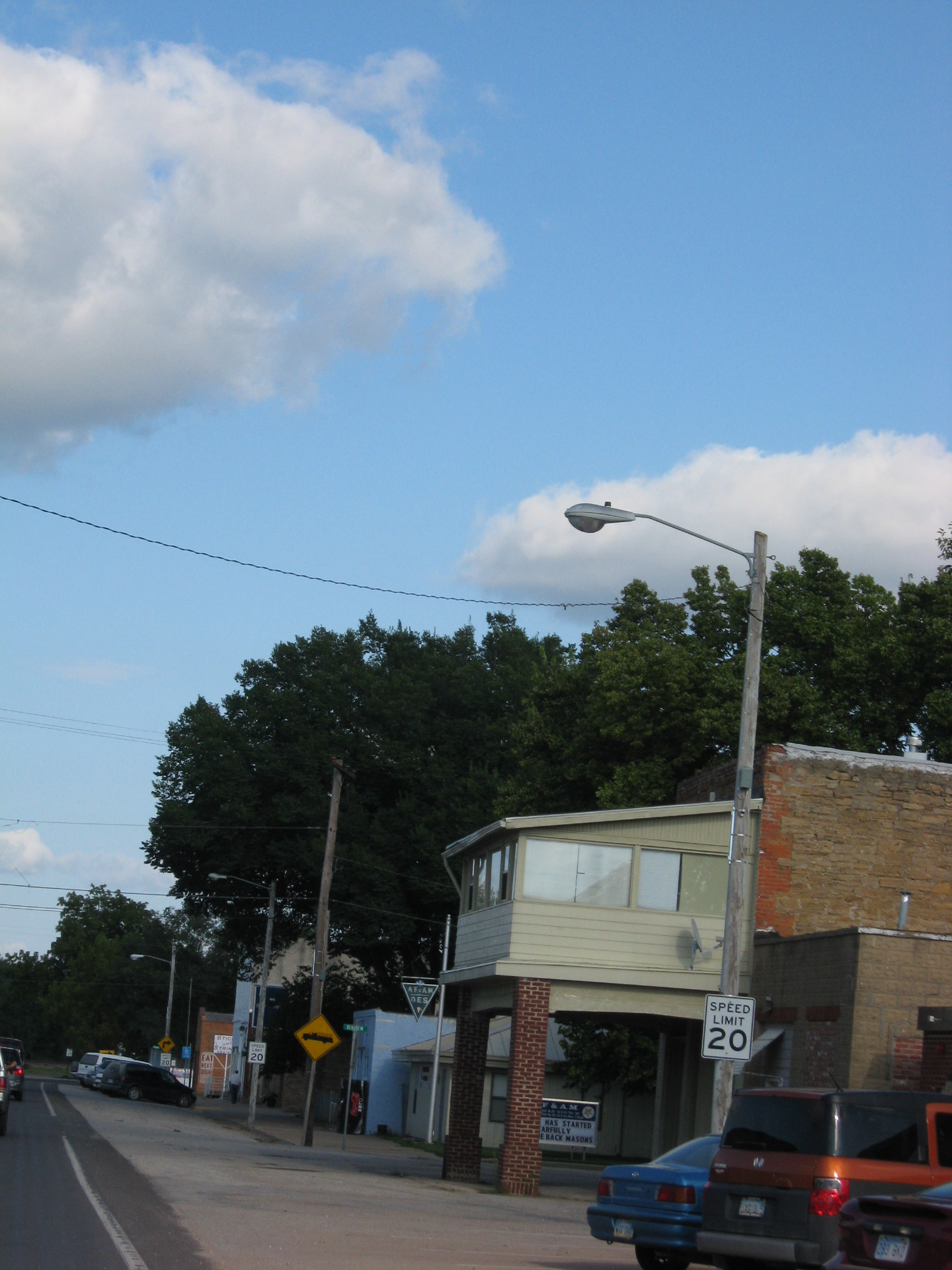
- Downtown Silver Lake (2009)

- Location within Shawnee County and Kansas

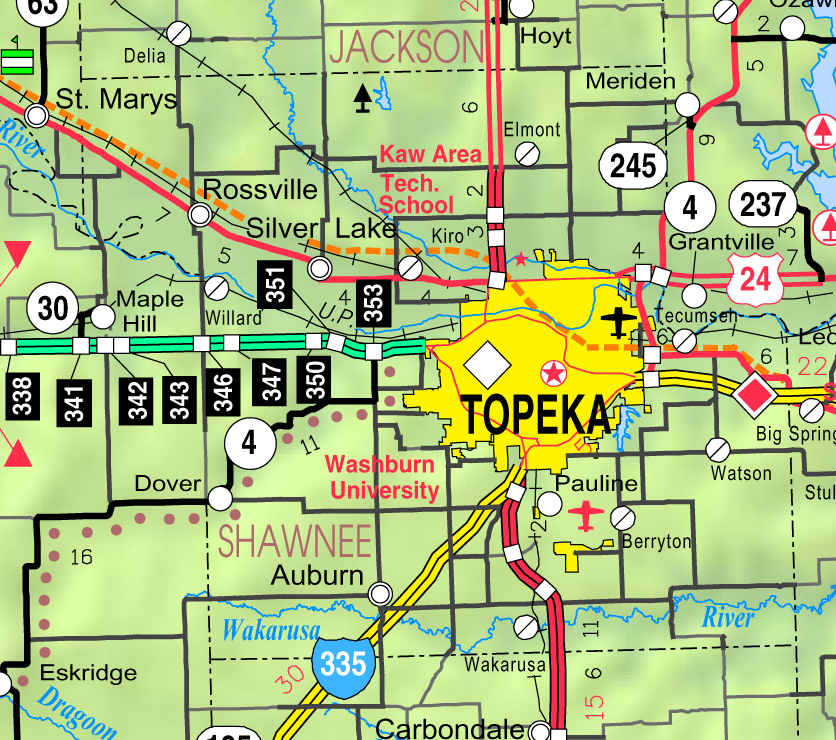
- KDOT map of Shawnee County (legend)
- Coordinates: 39°05′58″N 95°51′23″W
- Country: United States
- State: Kansas
- County: Shawnee
- Founded: 1868
- Incorporated: 1871
- Named for: Silver Lake

Area
  - Total: 0.59 sq mi (1.52 km^{2})
  - Land: 0.56 sq mi (1.45 km^{2})
  - Water: 0.027 sq mi (0.07 km^{2})
- Elevation: 912 ft (278 m)

Population (2020)
  - Total: 1,345
  - Density: 2,400/sq mi (928/km^{2})
- Time zone: UTC-6 (CST)
  - Summer (DST): UTC-5 (CDT)
- ZIP Code: 66539
- Area code: 785
- FIPS code: 20-65600
- GNIS ID: 2395889
- Website: www.silverlakeks.gov

Silver Lake is a city in Shawnee County, Kansas, United States. As of the 2020 census, the population of the city was 1,345.

== History ==
=== 19th century ===
Silver Lake was founded in 1868. It was named from the lake upon which it was situated. In the spring of 1871, the city of Silver Lake was incorporated.

=== 20th century ===
In 1911, a new six room brick school building replaced the original two room structure and the first high school class was organized. In 1928, that building became the elementary school. In 1952, the high school burned and a new high school was completed in 1953. In 1961, a new elementary school was completed.

In 1928, a two-lane hard-surfaced road was completed through the city. It was later known as US Highway 40 and later became US Highway 24.

== Geography ==
According to the United States Census Bureau, the city has a total area of 0.60 square miles (1.55 km^{2}), of which 0.58 square miles (1.50 km^{2}) is land and 0.02 square miles (0.05 km^{2}) is water.

Silver Lake is the nearest city to Topeka to the west, along U.S. Route 24. Recently Silver Lake has experienced a higher proportion of its citizens commuting into Topeka. The next city west along US 24 is Rossville.

Silver Lake was originally settled along the northern shore of the Kansas River; however, in the time since the town's founding, the river has changed course and is located one-quarter of a mile south of the town.

== Demographics ==
Historical population
Census	Pop.	Note	%±
1870	159		—
1880	268		68.6%
1890	256		−4.5%
1900	259		1.2%
1910	260		0.4%
1920	260		0.0%
1930	336		29.2%
1940	362		7.7%
1950	331		−8.6%
1960	392		18.4%
1970	811		106.9%
1980	1,350		66.5%
1990	1,390		3.0%
2000	1,358		−2.3%
2010	1,439		6.0%
2020	1,345		−6.5%
U.S. Decennial Census

Silver Lake is part of the Topeka, Kansas metropolitan area.

=== 2010 census ===
As of the census of 2010, there were 1,439 people, 563 households, and 414 families residing in the city. The population density was 2,481.0 inhabitants per square mile (957.9/km^{2}). There were 601 housing units at an average density of 1,036.2 per square mile (400.1/km^{2}). The racial makeup of the city was 95.8% White, 0.3% African American, 1.1% Native American, 0.3% Asian, 0.3% Pacific Islander, 0.3% from other races, and 1.9% from two or more races. Hispanic or Latino of any race were 4.1% of the population.

There were 563 households, of which 38.2% had children under the age of 18 living with them, 55.4% were married couples living together, 12.8% had a female householder with no husband present, 5.3% had a male householder with no wife present, and 26.5% were non-families. 23.8% of all households were made up of individuals, and 10.2% had someone living alone who was 65 years of age or older. The average household size was 2.56 and the average family size was 3.00.

The median age in the city was 36.3 years. 29.2% of residents were under the age of 18; 7.2% were between the ages of 18 and 24; 23.4% were from 25 to 44; 25.9% were from 45 to 64; and 14.3% were 65 years of age or older. The gender makeup of the city was 48.6% male and 51.4% female.

=== 2000 census ===
As of the census of 2000, there were 1,358 people, 538 households, and 394 families residing in the city. The population density was 2,470.7 inhabitants per square mile (953.9/km^{2}). There were 568 housing units at an average density of 1,033.4 per square mile (399.0/km^{2}). The racial makeup of the city was 96.83% White, 0.07% African American, 0.74% Native American, 0.22% Asian, 0.07% Pacific Islander, 0.59% from other races, and 1.47% from two or more races. Hispanic or Latino of any race were 1.77% of the population.

There were 538 households, out of which 35.3% had children under the age of 18 living with them, 59.3% were married couples living together, 9.7% had a female householder with no husband present, and 26.6% were non-families. 24.3% of all households were made up of individuals, and 7.2% had someone living alone who was 65 years of age or older. The average household size was 2.52 and the average family size was 2.98.

In the city, the population was spread out, with 28.4% under the age of 18, 7.8% from 18 to 24, 27.2% from 25 to 44, 25.8% from 45 to 64, and 10.8% who were 65 years of age or older. The median age was 37 years. For every 100 females, there were 105.4 males. For every 100 females age 18 and over, there were 96.6 males.

The median income for a household in the city was $52,788, and the median income for a family was $59,875. Males had a median income of $40,847 versus $28,438 for females. The per capita income for the city was $20,290. About 2.2% of families and 4.2% of the population were below the poverty line, including 1.9% of those under age 18 and 3.8% of those age 65 or over.

== Education ==
The community is served by Silver Lake USD 372 public school district, which operates two schools: Silver Lake Jr/Sr High School and Silver Lake Elementary School. There used to be a Silver Lake Kindergarten until 2009, when it merged with the Elementary school. The old Kindergarten building has since been turned into a district office.

== Notable people ==
- Lon Kruger, college basketball player and coach
- Chad Taylor, district attorney and U.S. Senate candidate
