= Jayhawk-Linn High School =

Location
- 14675 KS Hwy 52; Mound City, Kansas 66056; United States
- Coordinates: 38°08′00″N 94°49′43″W

Information
- School type: Public, High school
- School board: School Board
- School district: Jayhawk USD 346
- CEEB code: 172095
- NCES School ID: 200775000696
- Principal: Jim Dillon
- Teaching staff: 25.77 (FTE)
- Grades: 7 - 12
- Gender: coed
- Enrollment: 263 (2024–2025)
- Student to teacher ratio: 10.21
- Colors: Red and Gold
- Athletics conference: Three Rivers League
- Mascot: Jayhawk

Jayhawk-Linn High School is a public secondary school in Mound City, Kansas, United States, operated by Jayhawk USD 346. It serves students of grades 7 to 12. The school's sports teams are the Jayhawks and they compete as class 2A in the Three Rivers League.

== See also ==
- List of high schools in Kansas
- List of unified school districts in Kansas
