= Holcomb, Kansas =

City in Finney County, Kansas

- City
- One of three water treatment towers in Holcomb

- Location within Finney County and Kansas

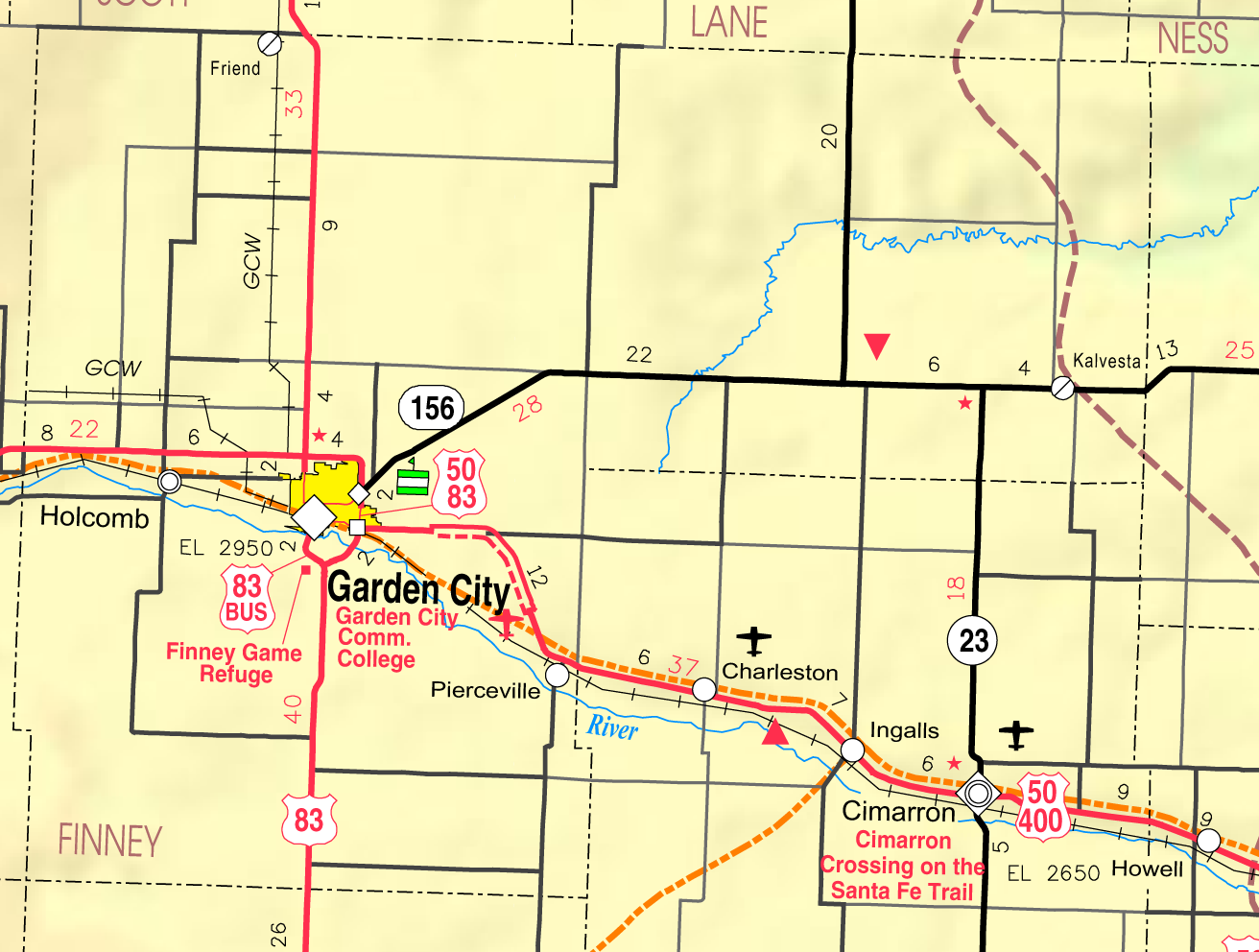
- KDOT map of Finney County (legend)
- Coordinates: 37°59′10″N 100°59′37″W
- Country: United States
- State: Kansas
- County: Finney
- Township: Sherlock
- Founded: 1900s
- Incorporated: 1961

Area
  - Total: 1.24 sq mi (3.20 km^{2})
  - Land: 1.24 sq mi (3.20 km^{2})
  - Water: 0 sq mi (0.00 km^{2})
- Elevation: 2,887 ft (880 m)

Population (2020)
  - Total: 2,245
  - Density: 1,820/sq mi (702/km^{2})
- Time zone: UTC-6 (CST)
  - Summer (DST): UTC-5 (CDT)
- ZIP Code: 67851
- Area code: 620
- FIPS code: 20-32575
- GNIS ID: 2394397
- Website: holcombks.com

Holcomb is a city in Finney County, Kansas, United States. As of the 2020 census, the population of the city was 2,245. It is located south of Highway 50.

== History ==
Holcomb took its name from a local hog farmer. The city was a station and shipping point on the Atchison, Topeka and Santa Fe Railway. The first post office in Holcomb was established in December 1909.

Holcomb was the site of the Clutter family murders in 1959. Two ex-convicts, Richard Hickock and Perry Edward Smith, were convicted of the killings. The murders were the basis for the 1966 book In Cold Blood, the 1967 movie In Cold Blood, the 1996 TV miniseries adaptation, the 2005 movie Capote, and the 2006 film Infamous.

== Geography ==
According to the United States Census Bureau, the city has a total area of 1.35 square miles (3.50 km^{2}), all land.

=== Climate ===
According to the Köppen Climate Classification system, Holcomb has a semi-arid climate, abbreviated "BSk" on climate maps.

== Demographics ==
Historical population
Census	Pop.	Note	%±
1910	75		—
1970	272		—
1980	816		200.0%
1990	1,400		71.6%
2000	2,026		44.7%
2010	2,094		3.4%
2020	2,245		7.2%
U.S. Decennial Census

=== 2020 census ===
As of the 2020 census, Holcomb had a population of 2,245, with 687 households and 576 families. The population density was 1,814.9 per square mile (700.7/km^{2}). There were 722 housing units at an average density of 583.7 per square mile (225.4/km^{2}).

The median age was 29.5 years. 34.8% of residents were under the age of 18, 10.0% were ages 18 to 24, 27.5% were ages 25 to 44, 20.8% were ages 45 to 64, and 6.9% were age 65 or older. For every 100 females, there were 98.8 males, and for every 100 females age 18 and over, there were 101.8 males.

Of the 687 households, 55.0% had children under the age of 18 living in them. Of all households, 60.8% were married-couple households, 14.4% were households with a male householder and no spouse or partner present, and 18.0% were households with a female householder and no spouse or partner present. About 12.2% of households were made up of individuals and 3.6% had someone living alone who was 65 years of age or older.

There were 722 housing units, of which 4.8% were vacant. The homeowner vacancy rate was 1.9% and the rental vacancy rate was 5.8%. 0.0% of residents lived in urban areas, while 100.0% lived in rural areas.

Racial composition as of the 2020 census
Race	Number	Percent
White	1,572	70.0%
Hispanic or Latino (of any race)	825	36.7%
Two or more races	374	16.7%
Some other race	238	10.6%
American Indian and Alaska Native	28	1.2%
Black or African American	22	1.0%
Asian	11	0.5%
Native Hawaiian and Other Pacific Islander	0	0.0%

Of the total population, 56.48% was non-Hispanic white.

Demographic estimates

The 2016–2020 5-year American Community Survey estimates show an average household size of 3.2 and an average family size of 3.3. The percent of those with a bachelor's degree or higher was estimated to be 11.4% of the population.

Income and poverty

The 2016–2020 5-year American Community Survey estimates show that the median household income was $70,179 (with a margin of error of +/- $8,682) and the median family income was $71,633 (+/- $9,033). Males had a median income of $48,934 (+/- $6,176) versus $26,033 (+/- $8,025) for females. The median income for those above 16 years old was $37,031 (+/- $6,990). Approximately, 7.1% of families and 8.2% of the population were below the poverty line, including 11.0% of those under the age of 18 and 4.8% of those ages 65 or over.

=== 2010 census ===
As of the census of 2010, there were 2,094 people, 654 households, and 521 families living in the city. The population density was 1,551.1 inhabitants per square mile (598.9/km^{2}). There were 680 housing units at an average density of 503.7 per square mile (194.5/km^{2}). The racial makeup of the city was 86.6% White, 0.3% African American, 0.4% Native American, 0.2% Asian, 9.2% from other races, and 3.2% from two or more races. Hispanic or Latino of any race were 0.5% of the population.

There were 654 households, of which 56.1% had children under the age of 18 living with them, 61.8% were married couples living together, 12.1% had a female householder with no husband present, 5.8% had a male householder with no wife present, and 20.3% were non-families. 16.8% of all households were made up of individuals, and 4.7% had someone living alone who was 65 years of age or older. The average household size was 3.20 and the average family size was 3.62.

The median age in the city was 28.9 years. 37.8% of residents were under the age of 18; 8.2% were between the ages of 18 and 24; 28.9% were from 25 to 44; 21% were from 45 to 64; and 4.1% were 65 years of age or older. The gender makeup of the city was 50.0% male and 50.0% female.

== Education ==
The community is served by Holcomb USD 363 public school district. Residents are zoned to Holcomb Elementary School (grades 3–5), Wiley Elementary School (Preschool-2), Holcomb Middle School (grades 6–8), or Holcomb High School (grades 9–12).

== Notable people ==
- Charles Plymell, Beat poet, publisher

== See also ==
- Santa Fe Trail
