= Deerfield, Kansas =

City in Kearny County, Kansas

- City
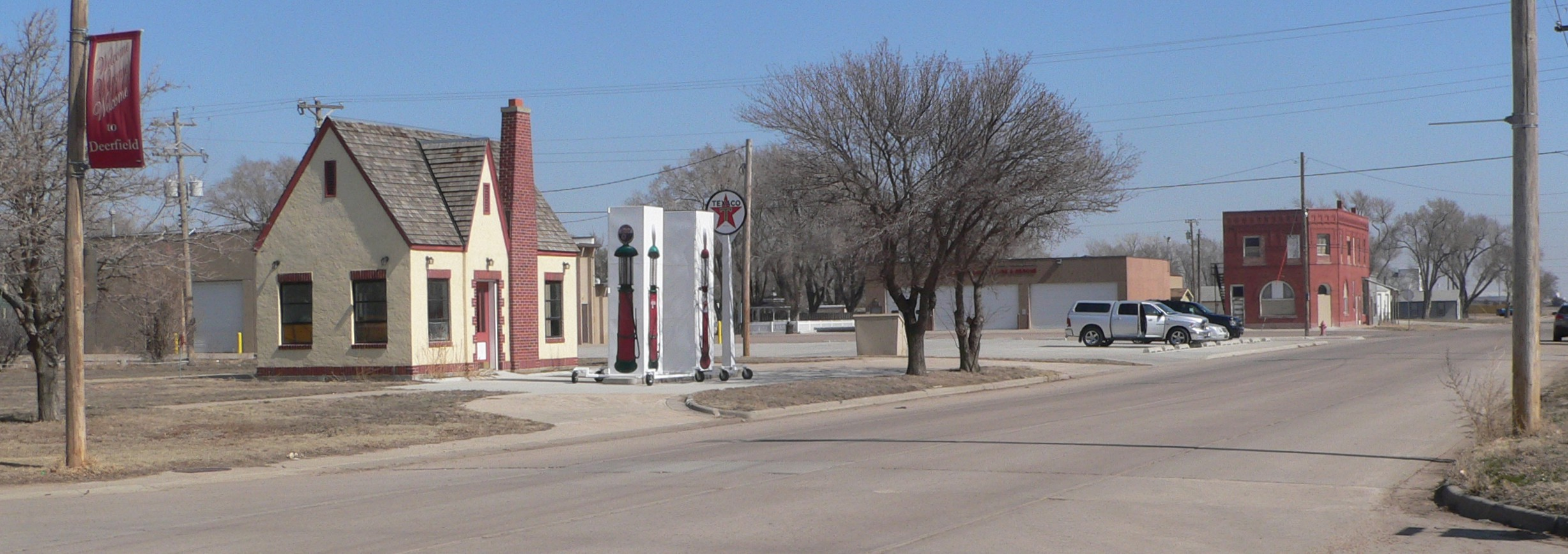
- Old Highway 50 in Deerfield (2015)

- Location within Kearny County and Kansas

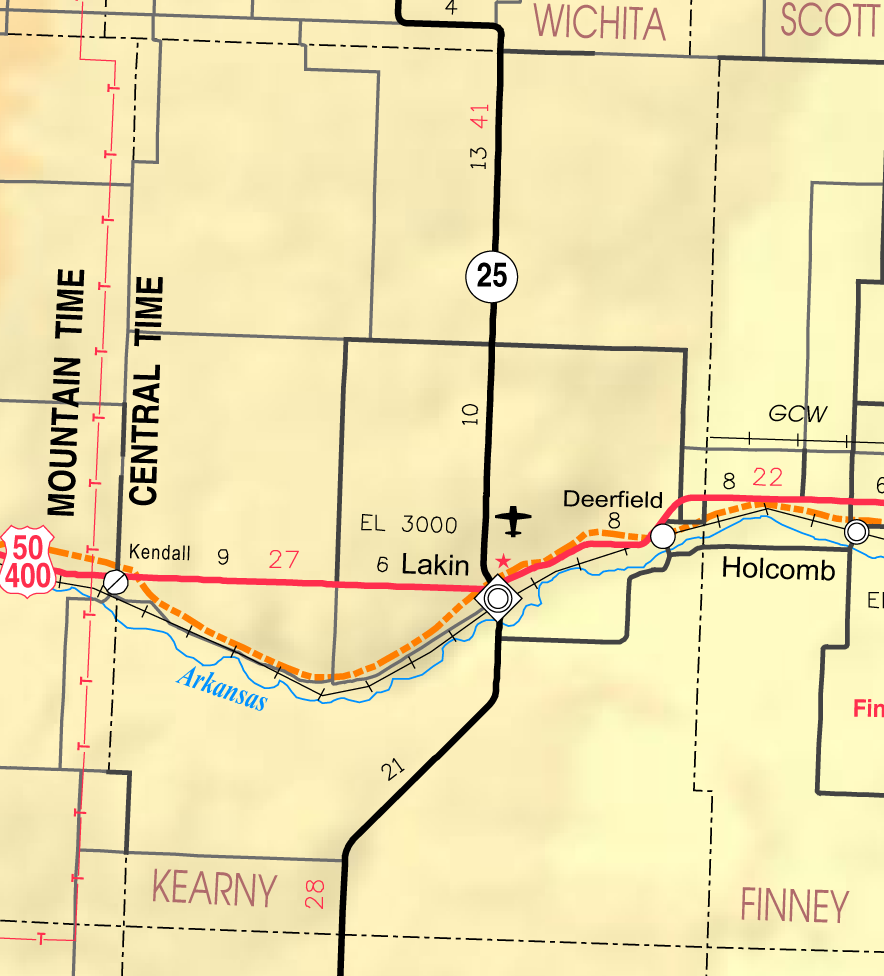
- KDOT map of Kearny County (legend)
- Coordinates: 37°58′55″N 101°07′59″W
- Country: United States
- State: Kansas
- County: Kearny
- Founded: 1885
- Incorporated: 1907

Area
  - Total: 0.48 sq mi (1.25 km^{2})
  - Land: 0.48 sq mi (1.25 km^{2})
  - Water: 0 sq mi (0.00 km^{2})
- Elevation: 2,950 ft (900 m)

Population (2020)
  - Total: 711
  - Density: 1,470/sq mi (569/km^{2})
- Time zone: UTC-6 (CST)
  - Summer (DST): UTC-5 (CDT)
- ZIP Code: 67838
- Area code: 620
- FIPS code: 20-17225
- GNIS ID: 2394490
- Website: deerfieldkansas.com

Deerfield is a city in Kearny County, Kansas, United States. As of the 2020 census, the population of the city was 711. It is located along US 50/US 400.

== History ==
The first settlement was made at Deerfield in 1885. Deerfield was incorporated as a city in 1907.

== Geography ==
According to the United States Census Bureau, the city has a total area of 0.47 square miles (1.22 km^{2}), all land.

=== Climate ===
According to the Köppen Climate Classification system, Deerfield has a semi-arid climate, abbreviated "BSk" on climate maps.

== Demographics ==
Historical population
Census	Pop.	Note	%±
1910	152		—
1920	284		86.8%
1930	325		14.4%
1940	356		9.5%
1950	440		23.6%
1960	442		0.5%
1970	474		7.2%
1980	538		13.5%
1990	677		25.8%
2000	884		30.6%
2010	700		−20.8%
2020	711		1.6%
U.S. Decennial Census

=== 2020 census ===
The 2020 United States census counted 711 people, 235 households, and 169 families in Deerfield. The population density was 1,478.2 per square mile (570.7/km^{2}). There were 259 housing units at an average density of 538.5 per square mile (207.9/km^{2}). The racial makeup was 49.93% (355) white or European American (39.8% non-Hispanic white), 0.84% (6) black or African-American, 1.55% (11) Native American or Alaska Native, 0.28% (2) Asian, 0.0% (0) Pacific Islander or Native Hawaiian, 24.61% (175) from other races, and 22.78% (162) from two or more races. Hispanic or Latino of any race was 56.82% (404) of the population.

Of the 235 households, 44.7% had children under the age of 18; 49.8% were married couples living together; 26.0% had a female householder with no spouse or partner present. 24.3% of households consisted of individuals and 9.8% had someone living alone who was 65 years of age or older. The average household size was 4.3 and the average family size was 5.1. The percent of those with a bachelor's degree or higher was estimated to be 4.2% of the population.

30.9% of the population was under the age of 18, 10.0% from 18 to 24, 26.6% from 25 to 44, 21.7% from 45 to 64, and 10.8% who were 65 years of age or older. The median age was 29.9 years. For every 100 females, there were 94.3 males. For every 100 females ages 18 and older, there were 94.8 males.

The 2016–2020 5-year American Community Survey estimates show that the median household income was $56,250 (with a margin of error of +/- $17,416) and the median family income was $55,625 (+/- $23,803). Males had a median income of $38,000 (+/- $10,037) versus $21,806 (+/- $11,290) for females. The median income for those above 16 years old was $29,917 (+/- $13,385). Approximately, 24.1% of families and 23.7% of the population were below the poverty line, including 22.0% of those under the age of 18 and 27.7% of those ages 65 or over.

=== 2010 census ===
As of the census of 2010, there were 700 people, 235 households, and 180 families residing in the city. The population density was 1,489.4 inhabitants per square mile (575.1/km^{2}). There were 249 housing units at an average density of 529.8 per square mile (204.6/km^{2}). The racial makeup of the city was 81.0% White, 1.1% African American, 1.1% Native American, 0.3% Asian, 14.6% from other races, and 1.9% from two or more races. Hispanic or Latino of any race were 48.7% of the population.

There were 235 households, of which 46.4% had children under the age of 18 living with them, 57.0% were married couples living together, 14.9% had a female householder with no husband present, 4.7% had a male householder with no wife present, and 23.4% were non-families. 19.1% of all households were made up of individuals, and 6.8% had someone living alone who was 65 years of age or older. The average household size was 2.98 and the average family size was 3.41.

The median age in the city was 32 years. 31.4% of residents were under the age of 18; 10% were between the ages of 18 and 24; 26.1% were from 25 to 44; 21.1% were from 45 to 64; and 11.6% were 65 years of age or older. The gender makeup of the city was 49.0% male and 51.0% female.

== Education ==
The community is served by Deerfield USD 216 public school district.

== See also ==
- Santa Fe Trail
