= Pomona, Kansas =

City in Franklin County, Kansas

- City
- Location within Franklin County and Kansas

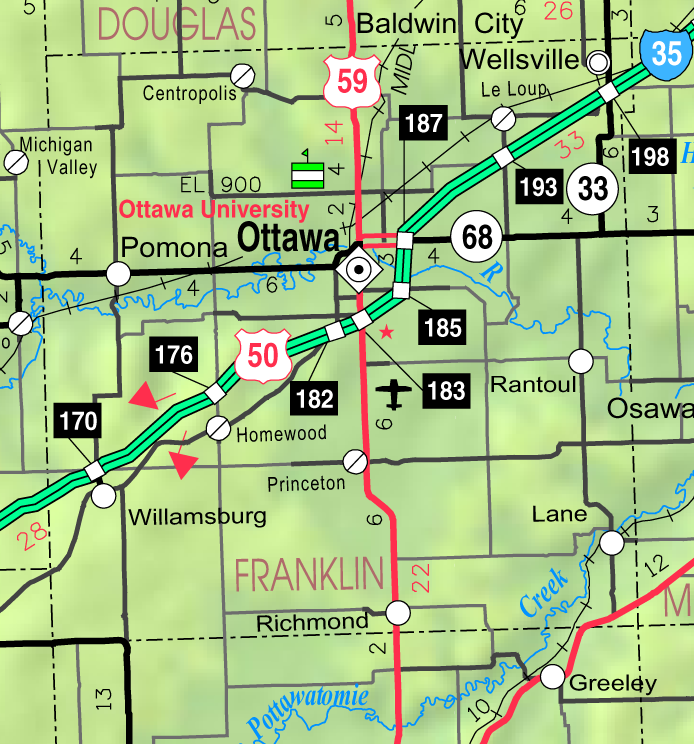
- KDOT map of Franklin County (legend)
- Coordinates: 38°36′39″N 95°27′11″W
- Country: United States
- State: Kansas
- County: Franklin
- Founded: 1869
- Incorporated: 1885
- Named for: Goddess Pomona

Area
  - Total: 0.80 sq mi (2.07 km^{2})
  - Land: 0.79 sq mi (2.05 km^{2})
  - Water: 0.012 sq mi (0.03 km^{2})
- Elevation: 958 ft (292 m)

Population (2020)
  - Total: 884
  - Density: 1,120/sq mi (431/km^{2})
- Time zone: UTC-6 (CST)
  - Summer (DST): UTC-5 (CDT)
- ZIP Code: 66076
- Area code: 785
- FIPS code: 20-57000
- GNIS ID: 2396249
- Website: www.pomonaks.org

Pomona is a city in Franklin County, Kansas, United States. As of the 2020 census, the population of the city was 884.

== History ==
Pomona was founded in about 1869. It was named for Pomona, the Roman goddess of fruit trees.

The first post office in Pomona was established in May 1870.

== Geography ==
According to the United States Census Bureau, the city has a total area of 0.75 square miles (1.94 km^{2}), all land.

=== Climate ===
The climate in this area is characterized by hot, humid summers and generally mild to cool winters. According to the Köppen Climate Classification system, Pomona has a humid subtropical climate, abbreviated "Cfa" on climate maps.

== Demographics ==
Historical population
Census	Pop.	Note	%±
1880	259		—
1890	466		79.9%
1900	547		17.4%
1910	523		−4.4%
1920	485		−7.3%
1930	501		3.3%
1940	485		−3.2%
1950	453		−6.6%
1960	489		7.9%
1970	541		10.6%
1980	868		60.4%
1990	835		−3.8%
2000	923		10.5%
2010	832		−9.9%
2020	884		6.3%
U.S. Decennial Census

=== 2020 census ===
The 2020 United States census counted 884 people, 345 households, and 229 families in Pomona. The population density was 936.4 per square mile (361.6/km^{2}). There were 381 housing units at an average density of 403.6 per square mile (155.8/km^{2}). The racial makeup was 88.12% (779) white or European American (87.44% non-Hispanic white), 0.45% (4) black or African-American, 1.13% (10) Native American or Alaska Native, 0.11% (1) Asian, 0.0% (0) Pacific Islander or Native Hawaiian, 0.79% (7) from other races, and 9.39% (83) from two or more races. Hispanic or Latino of any race was 3.39% (30) of the population.

Of the 345 households, 31.6% had children under the age of 18; 46.7% were married couples living together; 27.0% had a female householder with no spouse or partner present. 27.8% of households consisted of individuals and 13.3% had someone living alone who was 65 years of age or older. The average household size was 2.7 and the average family size was 3.2. The percent of those with a bachelor's degree or higher was estimated to be 8.4% of the population.

25.2% of the population was under the age of 18, 6.3% from 18 to 24, 24.2% from 25 to 44, 24.7% from 45 to 64, and 19.6% who were 65 years of age or older. The median age was 38.3 years. For every 100 females, there were 105.1 males. For every 100 females ages 18 and older, there were 107.9 males.

The 2016–2020 5-year American Community Survey estimates show that the median household income was $53,929 (with a margin of error of +/- $13,992) and the median family income was $61,518 (+/- $15,498). Males had a median income of $37,672 (+/- $3,184) versus $31,346 (+/- $8,756) for females. The median income for those above 16 years old was $35,938 (+/- $3,031). Approximately, 9.6% of families and 11.2% of the population were below the poverty line, including 21.7% of those under the age of 18 and 9.4% of those ages 65 or over.

=== 2010 census ===
As of the census of 2010, there were 832 people, 346 households, and 239 families living in the city. The population density was 1,109.3 inhabitants per square mile (428.3/km^{2}). There were 383 housing units at an average density of 510.7 per square mile (197.2/km^{2}). The racial makeup of the city was 95.9% White, 0.1% African American, 2.0% Native American, 0.1% Pacific Islander, 0.2% from other races, and 1.6% from two or more races. Hispanic or Latino of any race were 2.9% of the population.

There were 346 households, of which 32.1% had children under the age of 18 living with them, 52.3% were married couples living together, 10.4% had a female householder with no husband present, 6.4% had a male householder with no wife present, and 30.9% were non-families. 27.2% of all households were made up of individuals, and 12.4% had someone living alone who was 65 years of age or older. The average household size was 2.40 and the average family size was 2.90.

The median age in the city was 40.9 years. 24.8% of residents were under the age of 18; 8.8% were between the ages of 18 and 24; 22.1% were from 25 to 44; 29% were from 45 to 64; and 15.3% were 65 years of age or older. The gender makeup of the city was 51.4% male and 48.6% female.

=== 2000 census ===
As of the census of 2000, there were 923 people, 353 households, and 242 families living in the city. The population density was 1,220.9 inhabitants per square mile (471.4/km^{2}). There were 380 housing units at an average density of 502.6 per square mile (194.1/km^{2}). The racial makeup of the city was 95.45% White, 2.71% Native American, 0.11% from other races, and 1.73% from two or more races. Hispanic or Latino of any race were 1.52% of the population.

There were 353 households, out of which 37.7% had children under the age of 18 living with them, 54.1% were married couples living together, 12.2% had a female householder with no husband present, and 31.2% were non-families. 26.1% of all households were made up of individuals, and 12.2% had someone living alone who was 65 years of age or older. The average household size was 2.61 and the average family size was 3.18.

In the city, the population was spread out, with 30.1% under the age of 18, 6.9% from 18 to 24, 29.7% from 25 to 44, 19.7% from 45 to 64, and 13.5% who were 65 years of age or older. The median age was 35 years. For every 100 females, there were 100.2 males. For every 100 females age 18 and over, there were 92.0 males.

The median income for a household in the city was $30,521, and the median income for a family was $35,625. Males had a median income of $25,875 versus $18,641 for females. The per capita income for the city was $12,939. About 4.4% of families and 9.2% of the population were below the poverty line, including 6.5% of those under age 18 and 7.3% of those age 65 or over.

== Education ==
The community is served by West Franklin USD 287 public school district. West Franklin High School is located in Pomona. The School District includes K-5 schools in Williamsburg and Appanoose Township. The West Franklin mascot is West Franklin Falcons.

Appanoose Township High School was consolidated with Pomona High School in 1962. The Appanoose High School colors were red and white with the Indian as their mascot. Pomona High School's colors were black and red with the Pirate as their mascot. A new high school was built in Pomona for the Pomona Indians with the colors red, white and black.

School unification consolidated Williamsburg High School and Pomona High School into West Franklin High School in 2007.

== Notable people ==
- Foster Dwight Coburn, Secretary of Agriculture, Kansas

== See also ==
- Pomona State Park
