= Bishop Ward High School =

Location
- 708 North 18th Street; Kansas City, Kansas 66102; United States
- 39°6′47″N 94°39′2″W

Information
- Type: Private, Coeducational
- Religious affiliation: Roman Catholic
- Patron saint: St. Francis of Assisi
- Established: 1908
- President: Jay Dunlap
- Principal: Kevin O'Brien
- Grades: 9 to 12
- Colors: White and Black
- Athletics conference: Crossroads League
- Mascot: Cyclone
- Team name: Cyclones
- Rival: Piper High School
- Accreditation: North Central Association of Colleges and Schools
- Newspaper: Outburst
- Website: wardhigh.org

Bishop Ward High School is a private, coed, Roman Catholic high school in Kansas City, Kansas, United States. It is part of the Roman Catholic Archdiocese of Kansas City in Kansas.

== History ==
Bishop Ward High School was established in 1908 as Catholic High School at 1236 Sandusky, Kansas City, Kansas. In 1931, during the Great Depression, the current building was built at 708 North 18th Street, Kansas City, Kansas, and the school was renamed Bishop Ward High School. It is named after Bishop John Ward.

Currently Bishop Ward is a Catholic college preparatory high school.

== Athletics ==
Bishop Ward High School has a long history of success in athletics especially on the baseball diamond. The boys' baseball team has claimed 13 state titles, six of which came consecutively from 2003 to 2008. The football team won two state titles in 1971 and 1973. The boys' basketball team won a state title in 1938.

=== State championships ===
State Championships
Season	Sport	Number of Championships	Year
Fall	Football	2	1971, 1973
Fall	Cross Country, Boys	1	1981
Winter	Basketball, Boys	1	1938
Winter	Basketball, Girls	1	1989
Spring	Baseball	13	1958, 1960, 1983, 1998, 1999, 2003, 2004, 2005, 2006, 2007, 2008, 2010, 2014
Spring	Golf, Boys	1	1986
Total		19	

== Notable alumni ==
- Neil Allen, pitching coach for Minnesota Twins; former MLB player (New York Mets, St. Louis Cardinals, New York Yankees, Chicago White Sox, Cleveland Indians)
- Ed Dwight, African American sculptor and astronaut candidate. First African American test pilot to enter the Air Force training program from which NASA selected astronauts.
- Ray Sadecki, former MLB player (St. Louis Cardinals, San Francisco Giants, New York Mets, Atlanta Braves, Kansas City Royals, Milwaukee Brewers)
- David Segui, former MLB player (Baltimore Orioles, New York Mets, Montreal Expos, Seattle Mariners, Toronto Blue Jays, Texas Rangers, Cleveland Indians)
- Diego Seguí, former MLB player (Kansas City Athletics, Washington Senators, Seattle Pilots, St. Louis Cardinals, Boston Red Sox)

== See also ==
- List of high schools in Kansas
