= Altamont, Kansas =

City in Labette County, Kansas

- City
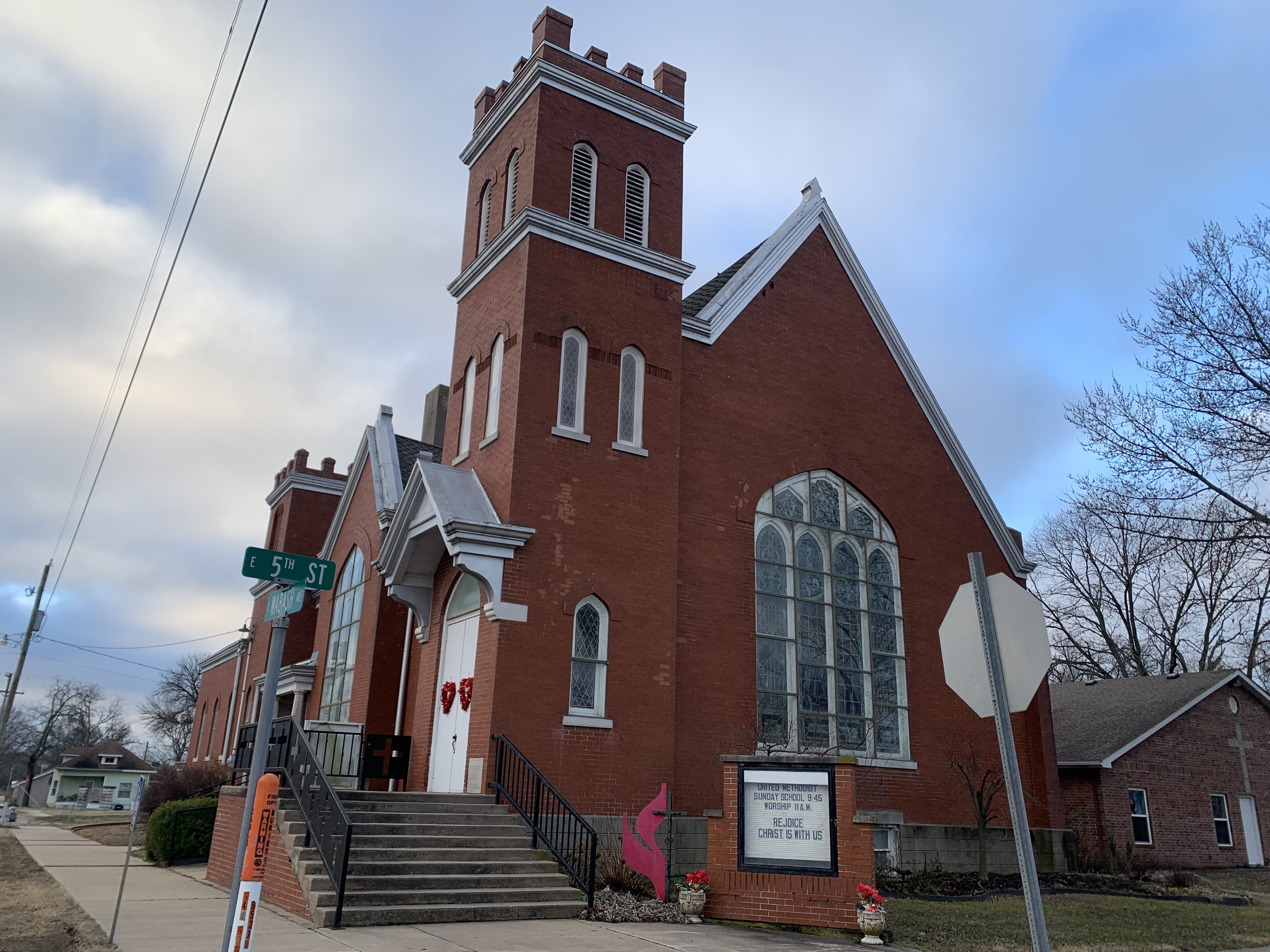
- First United Methodist Church in Altamont (2026)

- Location within Labette County and Kansas

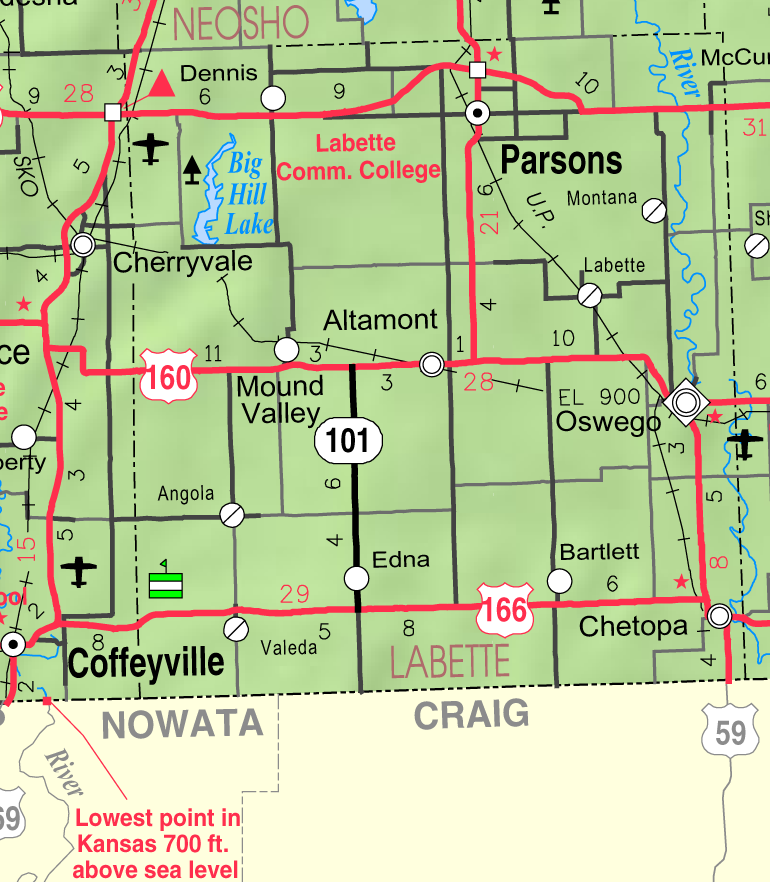
- KDOT map of Labette County (legend)
- Coordinates: 37°11′23″N 95°17′37″W
- Country: United States
- State: Kansas
- County: Labette
- Founded: 1879
- Incorporated: 1884
- Named for: Altamont, Illinois

Government
  - Mayor: Richard Hayward

Area
  - Total: 1.93 sq mi (4.99 km^{2})
  - Land: 1.90 sq mi (4.92 km^{2})
  - Water: 0.023 sq mi (0.06 km^{2})
- Elevation: 912 ft (278 m)

Population (2020)
  - Total: 1,061
  - Density: 559/sq mi (216/km^{2})
- Time zone: UTC-6 (CST)
  - Summer (DST): UTC-5 (CDT)
- ZIP Code: 67330
- Area code: 620
- FIPS code: 20-01550
- GNIS ID: 469438
- Website: altamontks.com

Altamont is a city in Labette County, Kansas, United States. As of the 2020 census, the population of the city was 1,061.

== History ==
Altamont had its start in the year 1879 by the building of the railroad through that territory. The first settlers of Altamont was the Huston family. The present day street is named after them. When they went to the nearby town of Oswego, people would ask them where they lived. They would say about a mile east of the lone tree. Since there weren't many trees in Kansas at the time this would be served as a landmark. It was named after Altamont, Illinois. Altamont was incorporated in 1884.

== Geography ==
Altamont is located at 37°11′23″N 95°17′37″W (37.189803, -95.293529). According to the United States Census Bureau, the city has a total area of 1.66 square miles (4.30 km^{2}), of which 1.64 square miles (4.25 km^{2}) is land and 0.02 square miles (0.05 km^{2}) is water.

=== Climate ===
The climate in this area is characterized by hot, humid summers and generally mild to cool winters. According to the Köppen Climate Classification system, Altamont has a humid subtropical climate, abbreviated "Cfa" on climate maps.

== Demographics ==
Historical population
Census	Pop.	Note	%±
1890	454		—
1900	546		20.3%
1910	606		11.0%
1920	603		−0.5%
1930	598		−0.8%
1940	642		7.4%
1950	652		1.6%
1960	672		3.1%
1970	845		25.7%
1980	1,054		24.7%
1990	1,048		−0.6%
2000	1,092		4.2%
2010	1,080		−1.1%
2020	1,061		−1.8%
U.S. Decennial Census

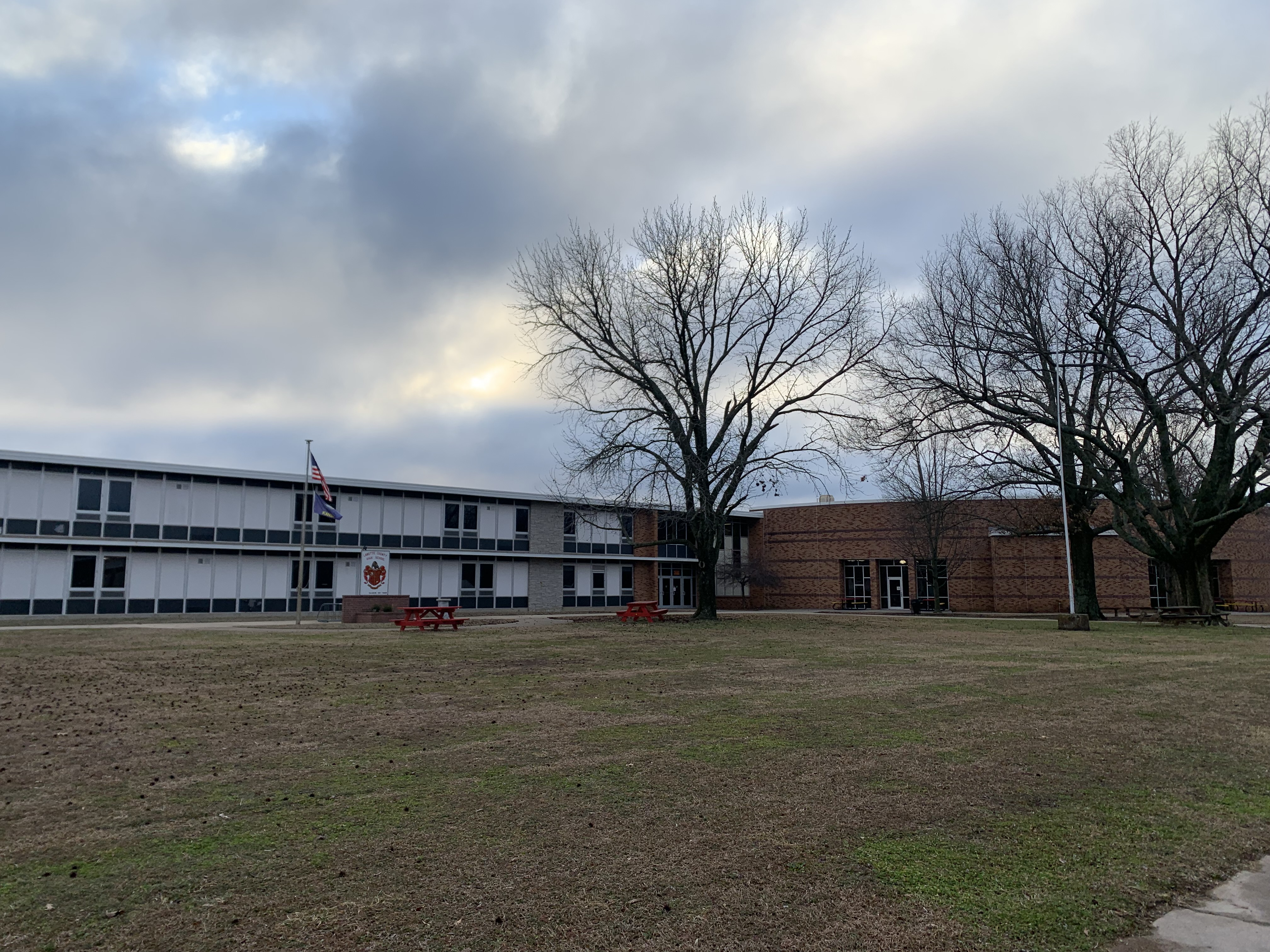
Labette County High School in Altamont (2026)

=== 2020 census ===
The 2020 United States census counted 1,061 people, 428 households, and 301 families in Altamont. The population density was 557.0 per square mile (215.0/km^{2}). There were 448 housing units at an average density of 235.2 per square mile (90.8/km^{2}). The racial makeup was 84.92% (901) white or European American (82.94% non-Hispanic white), 0.57% (6) black or African-American, 1.89% (20) Native American or Alaska Native, 0.38% (4) Asian, 0.0% (0) Pacific Islander or Native Hawaiian, 0.85% (9) from other races, and 11.4% (121) from two or more races. Hispanic or Latino of any race was 3.3% (35) of the population.

Of the 428 households, 36.9% had children under the age of 18; 54.9% were married couples living together; 24.3% had a female householder with no spouse or partner present. 25.0% of households consisted of individuals and 12.6% had someone living alone who was 65 years of age or older. The average household size was 2.5 and the average family size was 3.0. The percent of those with a bachelor's degree or higher was estimated to be 15.4% of the population.

26.2% of the population was under the age of 18, 7.5% from 18 to 24, 24.7% from 25 to 44, 23.7% from 45 to 64, and 17.9% who were 65 years of age or older. The median age was 38.2 years. For every 100 females, there were 110.5 males. For every 100 females ages 18 and older, there were 111.6 males.

The 2016–2020 5-year American Community Survey estimates show that the median household income was $48,971 (with a margin of error of +/- $10,120) and the median family income was $61,111 (+/- $2,603). Males had a median income of $36,776 (+/- $5,126) versus $29,375 (+/- $9,949) for females. The median income for those above 16 years old was $34,412 (+/- $7,544). Approximately, 6.3% of families and 10.4% of the population were below the poverty line, including 11.0% of those under the age of 18 and 7.1% of those ages 65 or over.

=== 2010 census ===
As of the census of 2010, there were 1,080 people, 419 households, and 291 families residing in the city. The population density was 658.5 inhabitants per square mile (254.2/km^{2}). There were 447 housing units at an average density of 272.6 per square mile (105.3/km^{2}). The racial makeup of the city was 92.7% White, 0.6% African American, 1.9% Native American, 0.5% from other races, and 4.3% from two or more races. Hispanic or Latino of any race were 2.5% of the population.

There were 419 households, of which 39.1% had children under the age of 18 living with them, 52.5% were married couples living together, 11.9% had a female householder with no husband present, 5.0% had a male householder with no wife present, and 30.5% were non-families. 27.4% of all households were made up of individuals, and 14.1% had someone living alone who was 65 years of age or older. The average household size was 2.58 and the average family size was 3.12.

The median age in the city was 36.1 years. 29.3% of residents were under the age of 18; 8.5% were between the ages of 18 and 24; 26.2% were from 25 to 44; 22% were from 45 to 64; and 14.1% were 65 years of age or older. The gender makeup of the city was 46.7% male and 53.3% female.

== Education ==
The community is served by Labette County USD 506 public school district. The district school office, Labette County High School, and Altamont Grade School are located in the city of Altamont, and four grade schools are located in other cities in the school district.

The Labette County High School mascot is the Grizzlies, and their colors are red and gold. Previously, Altamont High School was closed when school unification merged into USD 506.

Altamont Grade School, a Pre-K through 8th grade facility, acts as a feeder school to Labette County High School. Altamont Grade School's mascot is the Eagles, and their colors are Navy and Columbia Blue.
