= Hoyt, Kansas =

City in Jackson County, Kansas

- City
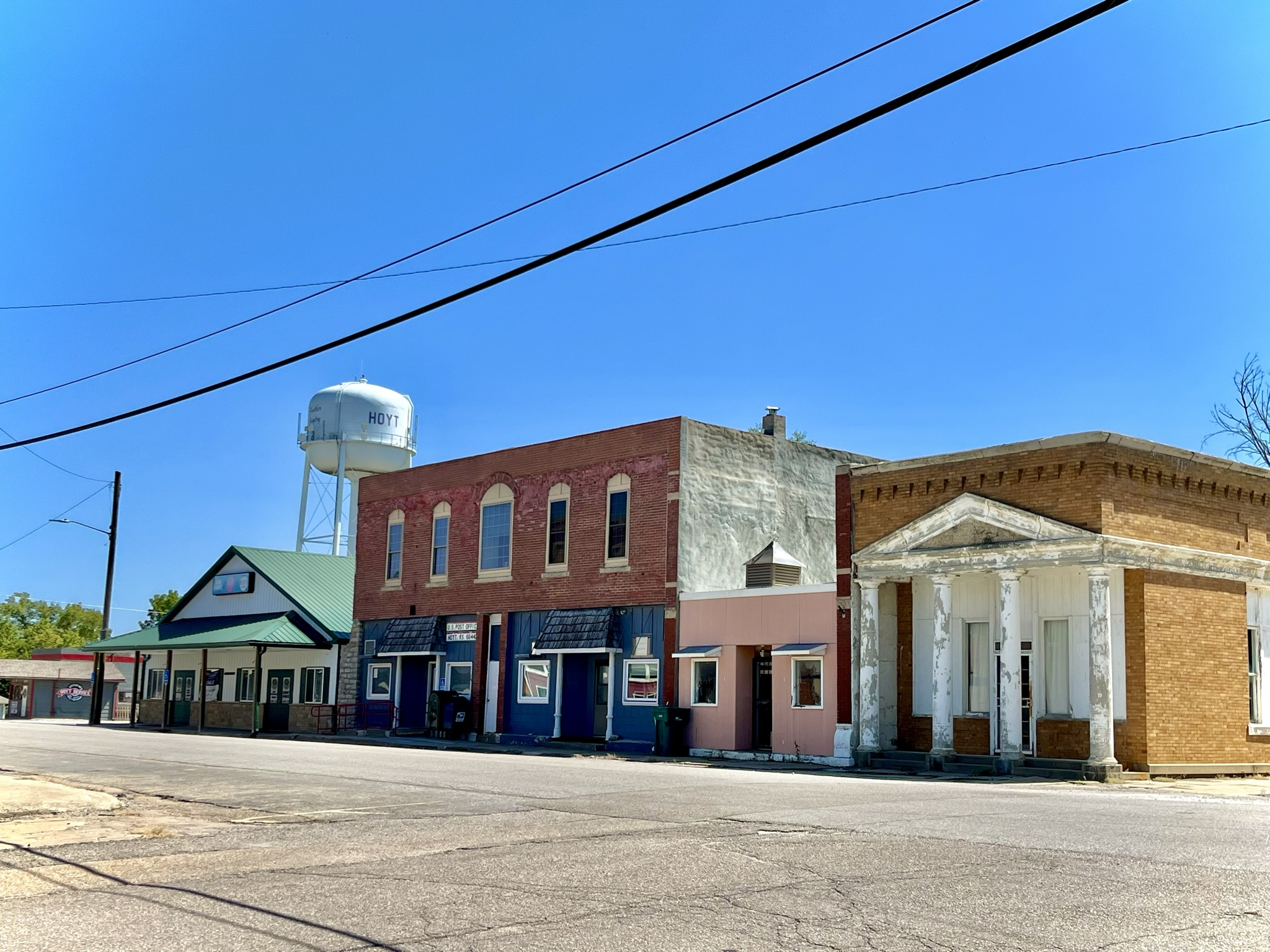
- Downtown Hoyt (2023)

- Location within Jackson County and Kansas

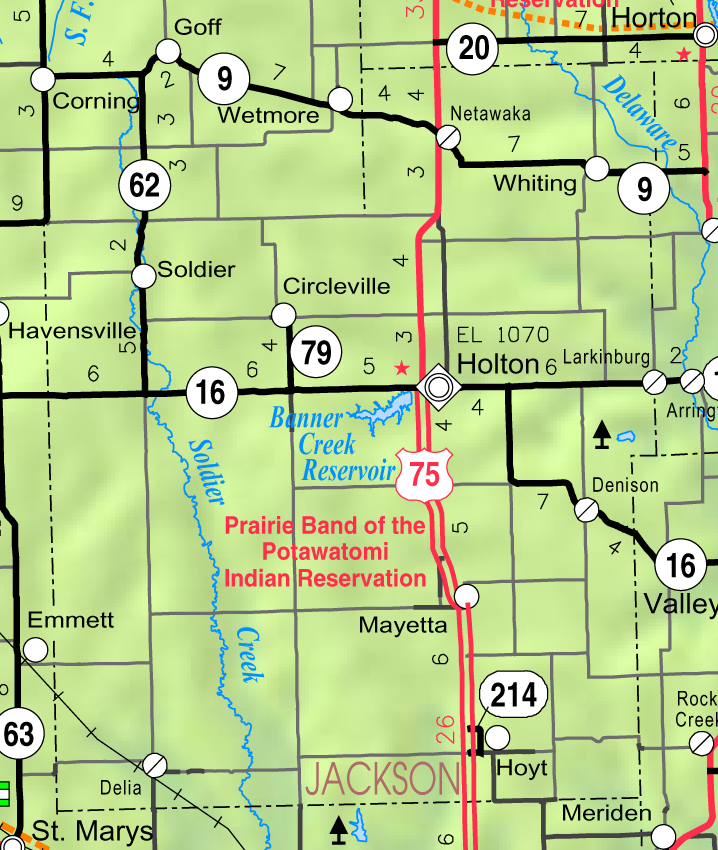
- KDOT map of Jackson County (legend)
- Coordinates: 39°14′58″N 95°42′25″W
- Country: United States
- State: Kansas
- County: Jackson
- Founded: 1886
- Incorporated: 1909
- Named for: George Hoyt

Area
  - Total: 0.47 sq mi (1.22 km^{2})
  - Land: 0.47 sq mi (1.22 km^{2})
  - Water: 0 sq mi (0.00 km^{2})
- Elevation: 1,165 ft (355 m)

Population (2020)
  - Total: 593
  - Density: 1,260/sq mi (486/km^{2})
- Time zone: UTC-6 (CST)
  - Summer (DST): UTC-5 (CDT)
- ZIP Code: 66440
- Area code: 785
- FIPS code: 20-33375
- GNIS ID: 2394433
- Website: hoytks.net

Hoyt is a city in Jackson County, Kansas, United States. As of the 2020 census, the population of the city was 593.

== History ==
Hoyt was founded in 1886. It was named for George Henry Hoyt, an abolitionist and attorney for John Brown.

The Chicago, Rock Island and Pacific Railroad originally passed through Hoyt and in the late 1890s and early 1900s, Hoyt was a large cattle and hay shipping point between St. Joseph, Missouri and Herington, Kansas. The Rock Island Line, as it was often referred to, last operated in 1980. Today there is little trace left of the railroad line except through aerial photography.

== Geography ==
According to the United States Census Bureau, the city has a total area of 0.50 square miles (1.29 km^{2}), all land.

=== Climate ===
The climate in this area is characterized by hot, humid summers and generally mild to cool winters. According to the Köppen Climate Classification system, Hoyt has a humid subtropical climate, abbreviated "Cfa" on climate maps.

== Demographics ==
Historical population
| Census | Pop. | Note | %± |
|---|---|---|---|
| 1920 | 282 | | — |
| 1930 | 228 | | −19.1% |
| 1940 | 238 | | 4.4% |
| 1950 | 246 | | 3.4% |
| 1960 | 283 | | 15.0% |
| 1970 | 420 | | 48.4% |
| 1980 | 536 | | 27.6% |
| 1990 | 489 | | −8.8% |
| 2000 | 571 | | 16.8% |
| 2010 | 669 | | 17.2% |
| 2020 | 593 | | −11.4% |
U.S. Decennial Census

Hoyt is part of the Topeka, Kansas Metropolitan Statistical Area.

=== 2020 census ===
The 2020 United States census counted 593 people, 238 households, and 157 families in Hoyt. The population density was 1,264.4 per square mile (488.2/km^{2}). There were 259 housing units at an average density of 552.2 per square mile (213.2/km^{2}). The racial makeup was 83.31% (494) white or European American (80.78% non-Hispanic white), 0.67% (4) black or African-American, 6.58% (39) Native American or Alaska Native, 0.67% (4) Asian, 0.17% (1) Pacific Islander or Native Hawaiian, 2.02% (12) from other races, and 6.58% (39) from two or more races. Hispanic or Latino of any race was 4.55% (27) of the population.

Of the 238 households, 37.0% had children under the age of 18; 46.2% were married couples living together; 26.5% had a female householder with no spouse or partner present. 26.9% of households consisted of individuals and 10.1% had someone living alone who was 65 years of age or older. The average household size was 2.3 and the average family size was 2.5. The percent of those with a bachelor's degree or higher was estimated to be 16.4% of the population.

26.0% of the population was under the age of 18, 7.4% from 18 to 24, 27.2% from 25 to 44, 27.3% from 45 to 64, and 12.1% who were 65 years of age or older. The median age was 36.1 years. For every 100 females, there were 100.3 males. For every 100 females ages 18 and older, there were 101.4 males.

The 2016–2020 5-year American Community Survey estimates show that the median household income was $58,472 (with a margin of error of +/- $13,989) and the median family income was $65,208 (+/- $21,535). Males had a median income of $39,922 (+/- $6,437) versus $40,543 (+/- $6,862) for females. The median income for those above 16 years old was $40,352 (+/- $3,997). Approximately, 11.1% of families and 9.9% of the population were below the poverty line, including 0.0% of those under the age of 18 and 3.7% of those ages 65 or over.

=== 2010 census ===
As of the census of 2010, there were 669 people, 253 households, and 184 families residing in the city. The population density was 1,338.0 inhabitants per square mile (516.6/km^{2}). There were 269 housing units at an average density of 538.0 per square mile (207.7/km^{2}). The racial makeup of the city was 85.5% White, 0.1% African American, 9.6% Native American, 1.2% Asian, 0.9% from other races, and 2.7% from two or more races. Hispanic or Latino of any race were 5.1% of the population.

There were 253 households, of which 41.9% had children under the age of 18 living with them, 51.0% were married couples living together, 15.8% had a female householder with no husband present, 5.9% had a male householder with no wife present, and 27.3% were non-families. 23.7% of all households were made up of individuals, and 9.1% had someone living alone who was 65 years of age or older. The average household size was 2.64 and the average family size was 3.10.

The median age in the city was 34 years. 30.8% of residents were under the age of 18; 7.9% were between the ages of 18 and 24; 29.6% were from 25 to 44; 21.4% were from 45 to 64; and 10.3% were 65 years of age or older. The gender makeup of the city was 49.2% male and 50.8% female.

=== 2000 census ===
As of the census of 2000, there were 571 people, 206 households, and 156 families residing in the city. The population density was 1,336.5 inhabitants per square mile (516.0/km^{2}). There were 219 housing units at an average density of 512.6 per square mile (197.9/km^{2}). The racial makeup of the city was 94.05% White, 2.98% Native American, 0.53% Asian, 0.70% from other races, and 1.75% from two or more races. Hispanic or Latino of any race were 2.63% of the population.

There were 206 households, out of which 42.2% had children under the age of 18 living with them, 60.7% were married couples living together, 9.2% had a female householder with no husband present, and 23.8% were non-families. 20.4% of all households were made up of individuals, and 8.7% had someone living alone who was 65 years of age or older. The average household size was 2.77 and the average family size was 3.18.

In the city, the population was spread out, with 32.2% under the age of 18, 7.2% from 18 to 24, 31.3% from 25 to 44, 17.7% from 45 to 64, and 11.6% who were 65 years of age or older. The median age was 31 years. For every 100 females, there were 99.7 males. For every 100 females age 18 and over, there were 99.5 males.

The median income for a household in the city was $46,806, and the median income for a family was $46,806. Males had a median income of $35,188 versus $22,750 for females. The per capita income for the city was $15,116. About 4.2% of families and 7.4% of the population were below the poverty line, including 12.3% of those under age 18 and none of those age 65 or over.

== Education ==
The community is served by Royal Valley USD 337 public school district, and Royal Valley High School.
