= Rose Hill, Kansas =

City in Butler County, Kansas

- City
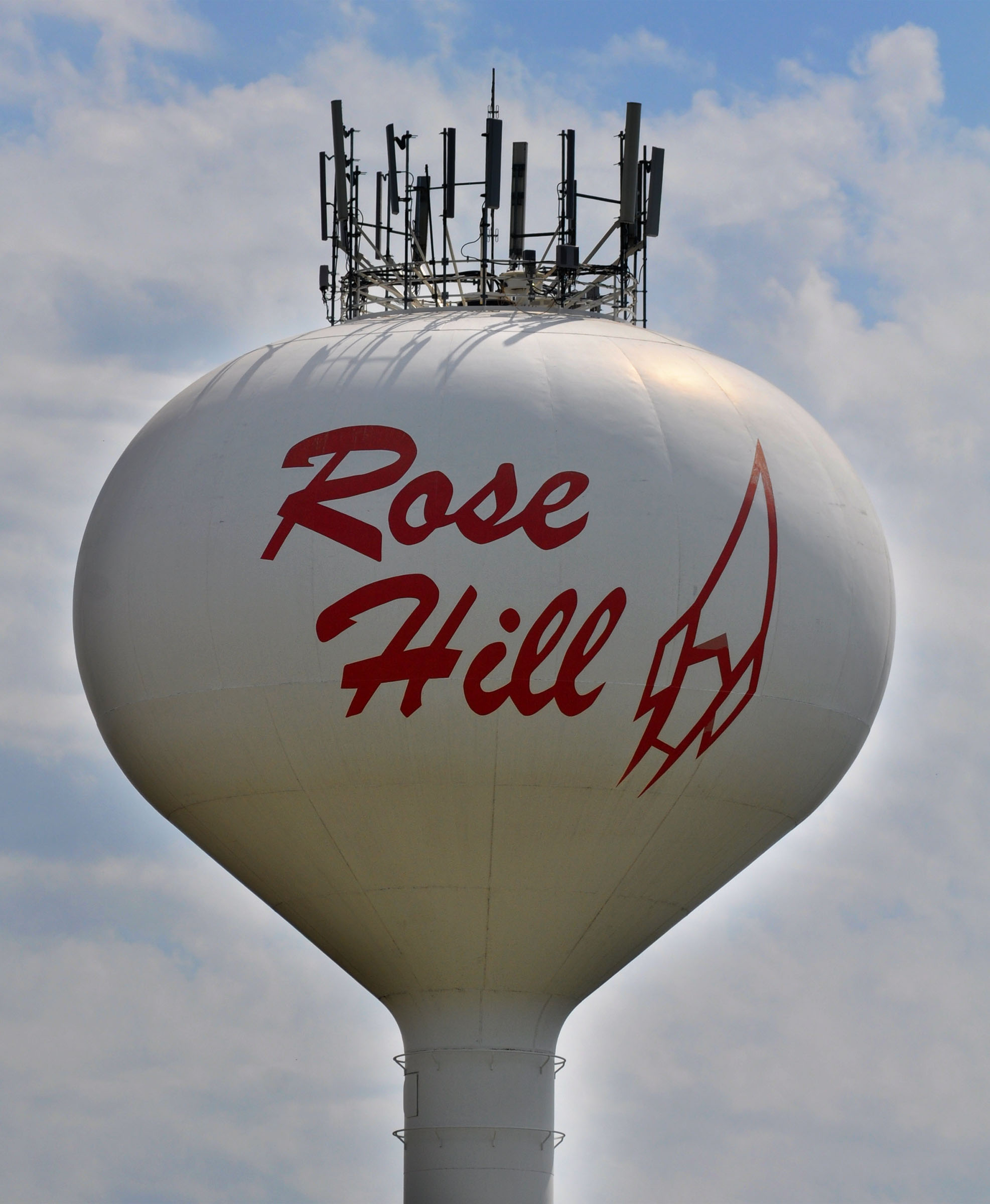
- Water tower in Rose Hill (2015)

- Location within Butler County and Kansas

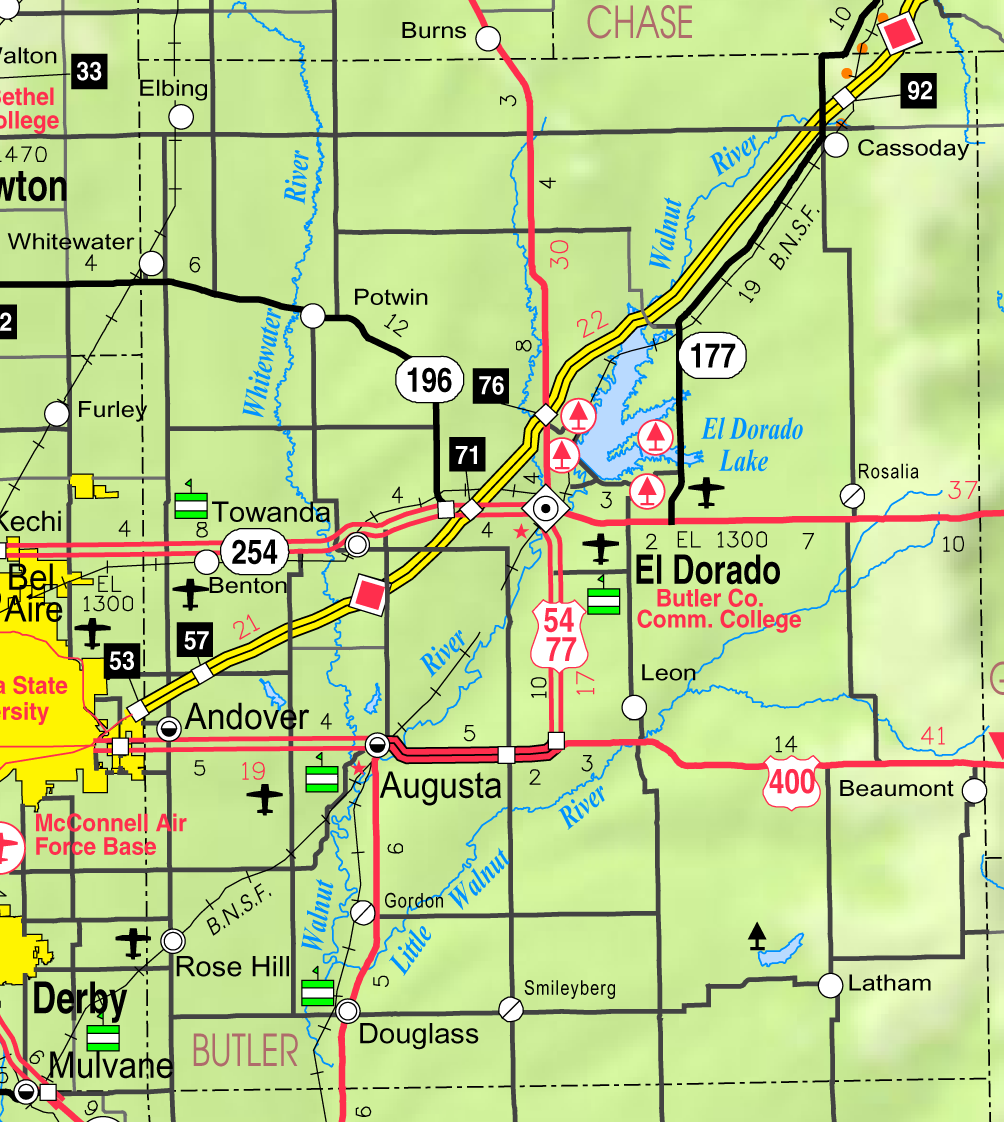
- KDOT map of Butler County (legend)
- Coordinates: 37°34′13″N 97°08′10″W
- Country: United States
- State: Kansas
- County: Butler
- Founded: 1892
- Incorporated: 1955

Government
  - Type: Mayor–Council
  - Mayor: Jeanine Schantz

Area
  - Total: 2.25 sq mi (5.84 km^{2})
  - Land: 2.25 sq mi (5.84 km^{2})
  - Water: 0 sq mi (0.00 km^{2})
- Elevation: 1,319 ft (402 m)

Population (2020)
  - Total: 4,185
  - Density: 1,860/sq mi (717/km^{2})
- Time zone: UTC-6 (CST)
  - Summer (DST): UTC-5 (CDT)
- ZIP Code: 67133
- Area code: 316
- FIPS code: 20-61250
- GNIS ID: 2396429
- Website: cityofrosehill.com

Rose Hill is a city in Butler County, Kansas, United States. As of the 2020 census, the population of the city was 4,185. it is located southeast of Wichita.

== History ==
=== Early history ===
For many millennia, the Great Plains of North America was inhabited by nomadic Native Americans. From the 16th century to 18th century, the Kingdom of France claimed ownership of large parts of North America. In 1762, after the French and Indian War, France secretly ceded New France to Spain, per the Treaty of Fontainebleau.

=== 19th century ===
In 1802, Spain returned most of the land to France. In 1803, most of the land for modern day Kansas was acquired by the United States from France as part of the 828,000 square mile Louisiana Purchase for 2.83 cents per acre.

In 1854, the Kansas Territory was organized, then in 1861 Kansas became the 34th U.S. state. In 1855, Butler County was established within the Kansas Territory, which included the land for modern day Rose Hill.

The first post office in Rose Hill was established in 1874. Rose Hill was founded in 1892.

== Geography ==
According to the United States Census Bureau, the city has a total area of 2.20 square miles (5.70 km^{2}), all land.

== Demographics ==
Historical population
Census	Pop.	Note	%±
1960	273		—
1970	387		41.8%
1980	1,557		302.3%
1990	2,399		54.1%
2000	3,432		43.1%
2010	3,931		14.5%
2020	4,185		6.5%
U.S. Decennial Census

Rose Hill is part of the Wichita metropolitan area.

=== 2020 census ===
As of the 2020 census, Rose Hill had a population of 4,185. The median age was 35.1 years. 30.3% of residents were under the age of 18, and 13.4% of residents were 65 years of age or older. For every 100 females, there were 95.6 males, and for every 100 females age 18 and over, there were 92.4 males age 18 and over.

0.0% of residents lived in urban areas, while 100.0% lived in rural areas.

There were 1,405 households in Rose Hill, of which 42.3% had children under the age of 18 living in them. Of all households, 65.3% were married-couple households, 11.2% were households with a male householder and no spouse or partner present, and 18.7% were households with a female householder and no spouse or partner present. About 16.7% of all households were made up of individuals, and 8.0% had someone living alone who was 65 years of age or older.

There were 1,455 housing units, of which 3.4% were vacant. The homeowner vacancy rate was 1.1% and the rental vacancy rate was 5.9%.

Racial composition as of the 2020 census
Race	Number	Percent
White	3,734	89.2%
Black or African American	29	0.7%
American Indian and Alaska Native	38	0.9%
Asian	33	0.8%
Native Hawaiian and Other Pacific Islander	0	0.0%
Some other race	54	1.3%
Two or more races	297	7.1%
Hispanic or Latino (of any race)	171	4.1%

=== 2010 census ===
As of the census of 2010, there were 3,931 people, 1,288 households, and 1,045 families living in the city. The population density was 1,786.8 inhabitants per square mile (689.9/km^{2}). There were 1,355 housing units at an average density of 615.9 per square mile (237.8/km^{2}). The racial makeup of the city was 95.5% White, 0.3% African American, 0.8% Native American, 0.7% Asian, 0.5% from other races, and 2.3% from two or more races. Hispanic or Latino of any race were 2.9% of the population.

There were 1,288 households, of which 46.3% had children under the age of 18 living with them, 67.5% were married couples living together, 10.0% had a female householder with no husband present, 3.6% had a male householder with no wife present, and 18.9% were non-families. 15.0% of all households were made up of individuals, and 6.5% had someone living alone who was 65 years of age or older. The average household size was 2.99 and the average family size was 3.33.

The median age in the city was 35.4 years. 30.7% of residents were under the age of 18; 8% were between the ages of 18 and 24; 26.1% were from 25 to 44; 25.7% were from 45 to 64; and 9.5% were 65 years of age or older. The gender makeup of the city was 49.1% male and 50.9% female.

== Education ==
The community is served by Rose Hill USD 394 public school district.

Rose Hill High School is a 4A high school with an enrollment of 610 students. Rose Hill High School is located on the southern edge of Rose Hill. Students moved into the current facility in October 1995. Rose Hill High School offers a general education program alongside several dual-credit college courses and early associate degree programs offered by the wing of Butler Community College attached at the southeast end. Rose Hill High School sponsors a wide range of student activities for the purpose of providing students with additional opportunities to develop into leaders and citizens. Also as of 2005 Rose Hill High School has become one of the few schools in Kansas to give a laptop to every pupil in the school.

== Notable people ==
- Kendall Gammon, American football player
- Josh Swindell, baseball player
- Brette Tanner, College Basketball Coach
