= Phillipsburg High School (Kansas) =

High school in Kansas, United States

Coordinates: 39.7458°N 99.3174°W

Phillipsburg High School is the public high school in Phillipsburg, Kansas at 240 South 7th Street. It is operated by Phillipsburg USD 325 school district. The Panthers are the school mascot and the school colors are blue and gold. Enrollment is around 171 students with 9 percent reported as minority. US News ranks Philipsbirg High School bronze and 83 percent of students test proficient in math and 87 percent proficient in English.

== See also ==
- List of high schools in Kansas
- List of unified school districts in Kansas
