= St. Xavier High School (Kansas) =

St. Francis Xavier Catholic School

Location
- 200 North Washington Street; Junction City, Kansas 66441; United States; 39°1′28″N 96°49′48″W

Information
- Type: Private, Coeducational
- Motto: Education for eternity through faith and reason
- Religious affiliation: Roman Catholic
- Denomination: Catholic
- Patron saint: Saint Francis Xavier
- Established: 1871
- Oversight: Roman Catholic Diocese of Salina
- Superintendent: Geoff Andrews
- Principal: Jodi Testa
- Chaplain: Fr. Kerry Ninemire
- Grades: Prek-12th
- Hours in school day: 8
- Colors: Blue and Gold
- Mascot: Rowdy The ram
- Team name: Rams
- Accreditation: North Central Association of Colleges and Schools
- Website: saintxrams.org

St. Francis Xavier Catholic School is a private, Roman Catholic school in Junction City, Kansas, United States. It is located in the Salina Dioceses.

== History ==
St. Xavier Catholic School was established in 1871 to serve parishioners of St. Xavier Church. In 1907, a larger school was built. A larger school was built in 1907 and staffed by Sisters of St. Joseph of Concordia, and in 1920, the parish opened a high school.

New grade school rooms and an auditorium and gymnasium were built in the early 1950s. In 1961,the parish built a new high school.

== School Activity's ==
=== Physical sports ===
Volleyball, Track, Cross Country, Cheerleading, and Basketball.

=== Competitive teams ===
Band, Chior, Eco-Meet, Scholar's bowl, Chess Team, Drama and Speech (Forensics).
