= Veritas Christian School =

Location
- 256 North Michigan Street; Lawrence, Kansas 66044; United States; 38°59′15″N 95°15′03″W

Information
- School type: Private school
- Established: 1978
- Administrator: Mary Woolery
- Officer in charge: Mary Woolery
- Grades: K-12
- Enrollment: <200
- Campus: Urban
- Colors: Blue and Gold
- Mascot: Eagle
- Rival: Bishop Seabury
- Newspaper: The Eagle's Eye
- Website: School Website

Veritas Christian School is a private, classical Christian school located in Lawrence, Kansas, United States. It is non-denominational and is supported by the tuition and donations from students and alumni. Veritas is a member of the Association of Classical and Christian Schools (ACCS) and a member of the Association of Christian Schools International (ACSI).

== History ==
It was opened in 1978 with the name of Douglas County Christian School.

In 1998, the pursuit of academic improvement was enhanced by the implementation of a classical method of instruction.

At the start of 2004 school year, grades 10th through 12th grades were added to Veritas, thereby offering a complete educational process for children from Kindergarten through 12th grade.

On-site library and computer lab facilities are provided. It has a playground and open areas for recess activities, the multi-purpose room for P.E. and school assemblies, and a hot lunch program.
