= Meridian Township, Kansas =

Township in McPherson County, Kansas, US

Meridian Township
- Township
- Location within McPherson County
- Coordinates: 38.23°N 97.40°W
- Country: United States
- State: Kansas
- County: McPherson

Area
  - Total: 36.065 sq mi (93.41 km^{2})
  - Land: 36.065 sq mi (93.41 km^{2})
  - Water: 0 sq mi (0 km^{2}) 0%

Population (2020)
  - Total: 370
  - Density: 10/sq mi (4.0/km^{2})
- Time zone: UTC-6 (CST)
  - Summer (DST): UTC-5 (CDT)
- Area code: 620

Meridian Township is a township in McPherson County, Kansas, United States.

== History ==
Meridian Township was organized in 1874.

== Geography ==
Meridian Township covers an area of 36.065 square miles (93.41 square kilometers).

=== Adjacent townships ===
- Spring Valley Township, McPherson County (north)
- Menno Township, Marion County (northeast)
- West Branch Township, Marion County (east)
- Highland Township, Harvey County (southeast)
- Emma Township, Harvey County (south)
- Garden Township, Harvey County (southwest)
- Mound Township, McPherson County (west)
- Lone Tree Township, McPherson County (northwest)

=== Major highways ===
- I-135
- US-81
