= Hesston shootings =

2016 mass shooting in Kansas, U.S.

- Location: Hesston and Newton, Kansas, U.S.
- Date: February 25, 2016; 10 years ago c. 4:57 p.m. – 5:23 p.m. (CST)
- Target: Excel Industries
- Attack type: Mass shooting, spree shooting, workplace violence, drive-by shooting, shootout
- Weapons: Zastava Arms N-PAP DF M70 semi-automatic rifle; Glock 22 semi-automatic pistol
- Deaths: 4 (including the perpetrator)
- Injuries: 14
- Perpetrator: Cedric Larry Ford
- Motive: Rage; drug intoxication as contributing factor

On February 25, 2016, three people were killed and fourteen others injured in a series of shootings in Newton and Hesston, Kansas, including in and outside an Excel Industries building. The shooter, identified as Excel employee Cedric Larry Ford, was then killed by a responding police officer.

== Shootings ==
The shootings began at around 4:57 p.m. at a street intersection in Newton, where Ford shot at two vehicles in a drive-by shooting. The first motorist suffered a non-fatal gunshot wound to the shoulder, while the second motorist escaped unscathed after a bullet pierced the car's windshield. Ford then drove down Old U.S. Route 81 and fired at oncoming traffic. His vehicle and another one crashed in a nearby ditch, after which he got out, shot and injured the other driver in the leg, and stole that victim's vehicle. According to conversations with law officials, they believe the shootings in Newton were to distract officials of what was about to happen at Excel Industries.

Ford then arrived at Excel Industries, a manufacturer of lawnmowers, in Hesston, injured an elderly woman in the parking lot, went inside the building, and fired randomly at the assembly lines, shooting several employees. According to one person who was shot but survived, Ford seemed to hesitate before firing. He then shot at Hesston Police Chief Doug Schroeder, the first officer to respond to the scene, and Schroeder fired back. Ford was struck by bullets and died at 5:23 p.m. Ford was armed with a Zastava Arms AK-47-style semi-automatic rifle and a Glock 22 semi-automatic pistol. At least 150 people were inside the plant at the time of the shooting.

The assailant had about 107 rounds of ammunition to start with, and he discharged an estimated 89 of those rounds during the attacks.

== Victims ==
Three people were killed and fourteen others injured in the shooting spree. The slain victims were identified as Renee Benjamin, 30; Joshua Higbee, 31; and Brian Sadowsky, 44. All of them died inside the Excel plant. Six of the injured were hospitalized in Ascension Via Christi St. Francis (Wichita), four in Wesley Medical Center (Wichita), and four in Newton Medical Center. Five of the injured were in critical condition.

Two helicopters and fifteen ambulances were used to transport victims.

== Perpetrator ==
Cedric Larry Ford.

Cedric Larry Ford (January 10, 1978 – February 25, 2016), a painter for Excel, was identified as the shooter. A native of Miami, Florida, he was on probation for a series of convictions in Miami and living in Newton at the time of the shootings.

Ford had a criminal record stretching back to October 1996, when he was arrested for carrying a concealed firearm at the age of 18. In Harvey County, Kansas, Ford was arrested for drug possession, theft, and parole violation. Ford also had a misdemeanor conviction in relation to a brawl that occurred in 2008, as well as several traffic violations in 2014 and 2015. He was also arrested in Broward County, Florida for resisting arrest, battery, and grand theft.

Prior to the shootings, on February 5, Ford's girlfriend accused him of assault and domestic violence, and issued a restraining order against him. The order was given to him on February 12, during which he "acted annoyed but not out of the ordinary", according to the police sergeant who served him the papers. However, because a sheriff's deputy failed to return the document on time, the order had to be served to Ford a second time. The second order was given to him on around 3:30 p.m. on the day of the shootings and may have been what sparked the event.

On June 8, an autopsy on Ford's body indicated high levels of methamphetamine and alcohol in his system. He had "more than 135 times the standard dose" of meth at the time of his death. According to an expert, "[t]he combination of meth and alcohol can produce psychosis, delusions and an increased likelihood of acting on one's impulses".

== Investigation ==
The Federal Bureau of Investigation, the Bureau of Alcohol, Tobacco, Firearms and Explosives, and the Kansas Bureau of Investigation were all called in for assistance in the investigation.

On February 26, Ford's 28-year-old ex-girlfriend Sarah Jo Hopkins was arrested for illegally providing him with the firearms used in the shootings. She was charged with one count of knowingly transferring a firearm to a convicted felon. According to court documents, Hopkins had police assist her in retrieving the firearms after she broke up with Ford, but later gave them back to him after he allegedly threatened her. Hopkins pleaded guilty to not alerting authorities that a convicted felon unlawfully possessed firearms and was sentenced to a year on supervised release.

== Aftermath ==
It was originally reported that a standoff had occurred at Ford's residence when a roommate refused police entry. A Newton Police Department spokesman later stated that no such standoff had occurred, and that SWAT officers were securing the house as a precaution while a search warrant was obtained. The standoff ended later that night when officers breached the property and found no one inside.

Nearby Hesston College, Hesston Public schools (which are within 100 yards of the plant), and Newton Medical Center were temporarily placed on lockdown. Immediately after the shooting, the Excel Industries factory was closed down. It reopened on March 10, two weeks after the shooting.

== Reactions ==
U.S. President Barack Obama spoke by phone to Hesston Mayor David Kauffman to give his condolences to the victims and his thanks to the first responders. Kansas Governor Sam Brownback issued a statement in a Twitter post, offering condolences to the victims. He later urged all residents in Kansas to pray for the victims and their families, and pledged his support for the investigation. Brownback later lauded the response of police officers during the shootings, and expressed his pride towards the law enforcement community of Hesston.

Paul Mullet, the president and chief executive officer of Excel Industries, said in a statement, "We're really saddened by this horrific event. Our heart goes out to all of our employees and all of the families whose loved ones got injured and killed." On March 1, State Senator Forrest Knox questioned the effectiveness of a Kansas law that allowed private businesses to restrict firearms on their property.

On May 25, three months after the shootings, several people gathered along U.S. Route 81 for a "spontaneous memorial" dedicated to the victims and those affected. A ceremony was also held to recognize the first responders involved in the shootings, along with support personnel, volunteers, and others. During the event, Chief Doug Schroeder, the first responding officer who engaged Ford in a gunfight and killed him, was awarded a Medal of Valor for his heroic actions.
