= Zimmerdale, Kansas =

Unincorporated community in Harvey County, Kansas

- Unincorporated Community
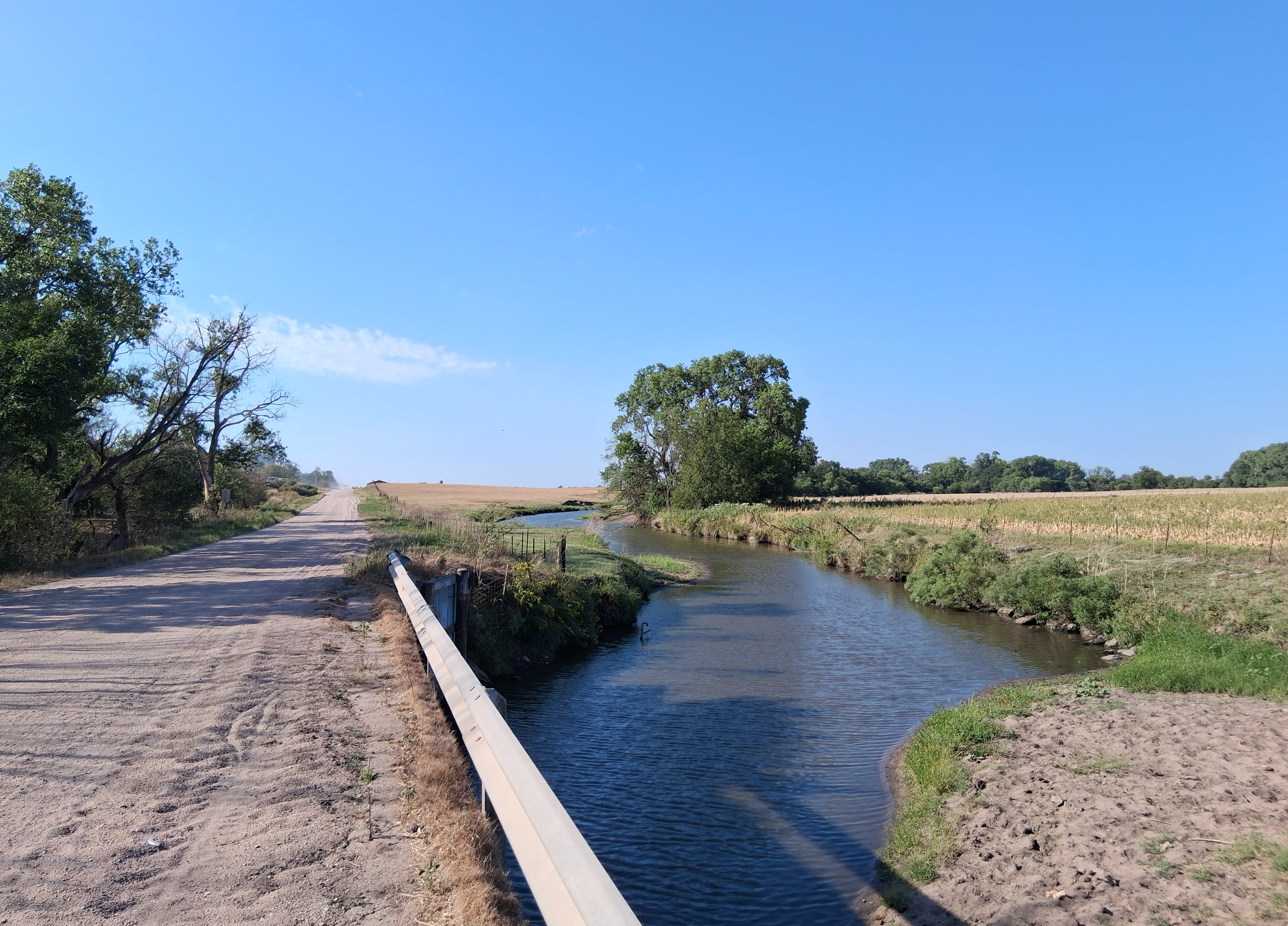
- East Emma Creek in Zimmerdale in 2026

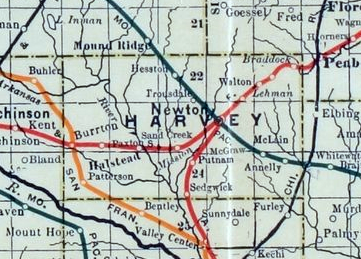
- 1915 railroad map of Harvey County

- Location within Kansas Location within the United States
- Coordinates: 38°06′10″N 97°23′24″W
- Country: United States
- State: Kansas
- County: Harvey
- Township: Emma
- Named for: Martin Zimmermann
- Elevation: 1,467 ft (447 m)
- Time zone: UTC-6 (CST)
  - Summer (DST): UTC-5 (CDT)
- Area code: 620
- FIPS code: 20-80975
- GNIS ID: 477994

Zimmerdale is an unincorporated community in Harvey County, Kansas, United States. The community is located along Old Highway 81 and a railroad line between Hesston and Newton.

== History ==
Originally it was named Trousdale for W. Truesdale. Later, it was renamed to Zimmerdale for Martin Zimmermann.

== Education ==
The community is served by Hesston USD 460 public school district.

== Transportation ==
The Missouri Pacific Railroad formerly provided passenger rail service along a route from Eldorado to McPherson although this had ended prior to 1946. As of 2025, the nearest passenger rail station is located in Newton, where Amtrak's Southwest Chief stops once daily on a route from Chicago to Los Angeles.

== See also ==
- Trousdale, Kansas in Edwards County
