= Richland Township, Harvey County, Kansas =

Township in Kansas, United States

Richland Township Harvey County, Kansas
- Township
- Location within Harvey County

- Location within state of Kansas
- Coordinates: 37°57′20″N 97°12′26″W
- Country: United States
- State: Kansas
- County: Harvey

Area
  - Total: 36.34 sq mi (94.11 km^{2})
  - Land: 36.27 sq mi (93.93 km^{2})
  - Water: 0.073 sq mi (0.19 km^{2}) 0.2%
- Elevation: 1,411 ft (430 m)

Population (2020)
  - Total: 358
  - Density: 9.87/sq mi (3.81/km^{2})
- Time zone: UTC-6 (CST)
  - Summer (DST): UTC-5 (CDT)
- FIPS code: 20-59350
- GNIS ID: 473711
- Website: County website

Richland Township is a township in Harvey County, Kansas, United States. As of the 2020 census, its population was 358.

== Geography ==
Richland Township covers an area of 36.34 square miles (94.1 km^{2}) and contains the ghost town of Annelly and the southeast corner of the unincorporated community of McLain. According to the USGS, it contains one cemetery, Whitewater. The streams of East Branch Whitewater Creek, West Branch Whitewater Creek and West Wildcat Creek run through this township.
