= Annely =

Annely is a given name. Notable people with the given name include:

- Annely Akkermann (born 1972), Estonian politician
- Annely Juda CBE (born Anneliese Emily Brauer; 1914–2006), German art dealer
- Annely Ojastu (born 1960), Estonian Paralympic athlete
- Annely Peebo (born 1971), Estonian operatic mezzo-soprano

== See also ==
- Anne, another given name
- Annelly, Kansas
