= Emma Township =

Emma Township may refer to the following townships in the United States:

- Emma Township, White County, Illinois
- Emma Township, Harvey County, Kansas

== See also ==
- Lake Emma Township, Hubbard County, Minnesota
