= Patterson, Kansas =

Unincorporated community in Harvey County, Kansas

- Unincorporated Community
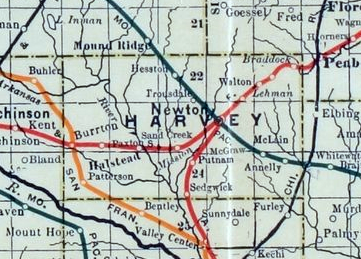
- 1915 railroad map of Harvey County

- Location within Kansas Location within the United States
- Coordinates: 37°56′36″N 97°39′18″W
- Country: United States
- State: Kansas
- County: Harvey
- Township: Lake
- Founded: 1888
- Named for: James Patterson
- Elevation: 1,437 ft (438 m)
- Time zone: UTC-6 (CST)
  - Summer (DST): UTC-5 (CDT)
- Area code: 620
- FIPS code: 20-54725
- GNIS ID: 484647

Patterson is an unincorporated community in Harvey County, Kansas, United States. It is located five miles south of Burrton at SW 84th St and S Patterson Rd.

== History ==
Patterson was named for James Patterson, an early settler in Lake Township, Harvey County, Kansas. L.A. Hamlin "surveyed and laid out" the Patterson town site September 25, 1888, on land owned by Dr. Thomas S. Hunt (1830-1900) and Susan Barbee Hunt (1841-1920). In 1887, Dr. Hunt deeded land for right-of-way to the Kansas Midland Railroad Company. He developed the town and sold building lots. Patterson became a station on a railroad segment of St. Louis–San Francisco Railway that ran from Wichita to Burrton. Two passenger trains a day passed through Patterson.

A post office was opened in Patterson in 1888, and remained in operation until it was discontinued in 1927.

The community was located along a railroad line between Burrton and Bentley, but the track was removed in the 1990s or 2000s.

== Education ==
The community is served by Burrton USD 369 public school district.
