= Putnam, Kansas =

Unincorporated community in Harvey County, Kansas

- Unincorporated Community
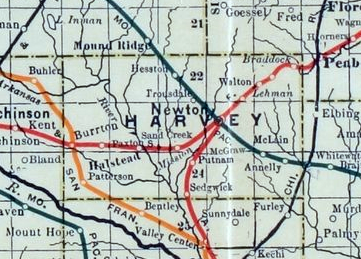
- 1915 railroad map of Harvey County

- Location within Kansas Location within the United States
- Coordinates: 37°58′08″N 97°23′16″W
- Country: United States
- State: Kansas
- County: Harvey
- Township: Sedgwick
- Elevation: 1,398 ft (426 m)
- Time zone: UTC-6 (CST)
  - Summer (DST): UTC-5 (CDT)
- Area code: 620
- FIPS code: 20-58025
- GNIS ID: 484649

Putnam is an unincorporated community in Harvey County, Kansas, United States. It is located southwest of Newton at the intersection of West Road and SW 60th Street, along the BNSF Railway.

== History ==
Putnam had a post office from 1891 until 1907.

== Geography ==
The community is located south of Newton near SW 60th and S. West Road. It was established along a former railroad line between Newton and Wichita.

== Education ==
The community is served by Sedgwick USD 439 public school district.
