= Trousdale, Kansas =

Unincorporated community in Edwards County, Kansas

- Unincorporated community
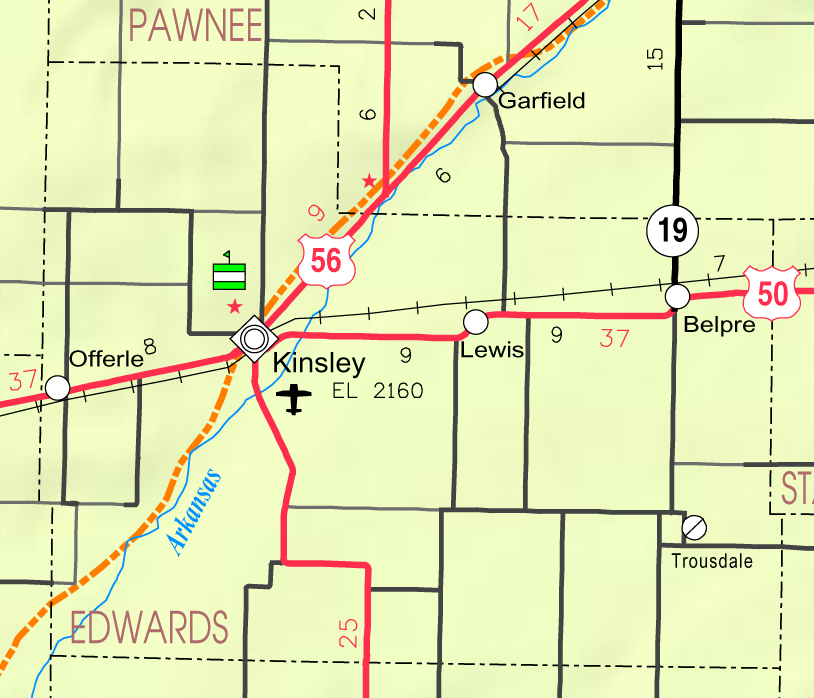
- KDOT map of Edwards County (legend)

- Location within Kansas Location within the United States
- Coordinates: 37°48′55″N 99°05′08″W
- Country: United States
- State: Kansas
- County: Edwards
- Township: Lincoln
- Founded: 1915
- Named for: Mr. Trousdale
- Elevation: 2,083 ft (635 m)
- Time zone: UTC-6 (CST)
  - Summer (DST): UTC-5 (CDT)
- ZIP Code: 67059
- FIPS code: 20-71550
- GNIS ID: 473756

Trousdale is an unincorporated community in Lincoln Township, Edwards County, Kansas, United States. It is located along 270th Ave between S Rd and T Rd, approximately nine miles south of Belpre, or 13 miles north of Haviland.

== History ==
The community began when a railroad junction was constructed in 1915. It is named for a Newton, Kansas resident who owned land in the vicinity. At its peak it boasted a bank (which closed during the Depression), Trousdale Grade School and High School, several retail establishments, and two grain elevators. A high line was built to the community in 1927 to provide electrical service.

A post office was opened in Trousdale in 1916, and remained in operation until it was discontinued and closed in 1967.

In 2006, the Trousdale Methodist Church, a repair shop/parts store, a grain storage facility, and an unnamed fuel retail outlet were the only businesses in addition to family farming operations that were in Trousdale, along with some remaining houses. As of 2023, there were about eight homes in Trousdale, while the gas station is closed, but it is unclear whether this closing was temporary or permanent.

=== 2007 Tornado ===
On May 4, 2007, a 2.2 mile wide tornado hit Trousdale, soon after an EF5 tornado destroyed Greensburg to the south. Much of Trousdale was badly damaged, including the nearby church, which would later be rebuilt. The tornado that hit the town would later be rated EF3, though there is speculation that the Trousdale tornado may have been an EF5.

== Education ==
The community is served by Macksville USD 351 public school district.

== Notable people ==
- Bruce DeHaven, special teams coach of the Buffalo Bills, a Trousdale High School graduate.

== See also ==
- Zimmerdale, Kansas in Harvey County - originally named Trousdale
