= Meridian Township =

Meridian Township may refer to:

- Meridian Township, Clinton County, Illinois
- Meridian Township, McPherson County, Kansas
- Meridian Charter Township, Michigan
