= Goessel High School =

Location
- 100 East Main Street; Goessel, Kansas 67053; United States
- Coordinates: 38.246932°N 97.350061°W

Information
- School type: Public, High School
- School board: Board Website
- School district: Goessel USD 411
- CEEB code: 171130
- Principal: Kenroy Wilson
- Teaching staff: 13.50 (FTE)
- Grades: 6–12
- Gender: coed
- Enrollment: 157 (2023–2024)
- Student to teacher ratio: 11.63
- Campus type: rural
- Colors: Blue; White
- Athletics: Class 8-Man I, District 8
- Athletics conference: Wheat State
- Mascot: Bluebirds
- Communities served: Goessel
- Website: School website

Goessel High School is a public secondary school in Goessel, Kansas, United States. It is operated by Goessel USD 411 school district. It is the sole public high school for the community of Goessel and nearby rural areas of Marion / McPherson / Harvey Counties.

== Academics ==
Goessel High School was recognized in 2007 and 2008 by U.S. News & World Report as a Bronze Medal Finalist in their Best of U.S. High Schools.

== Extracurricular activities ==
=== Scholars Bowl ===
In February 2012, Goessel won the Scholars Bowl at the Regional Tournament in Ell-Saline. In Class 1A Division I, Goessel finished 4th after winning their group in pool play. One year later, Goessel's team again made it back to the State Championships and was able to one-up the team from last year finishing 3rd overall. The team won their only state championship in 2015.

=== Athletics ===
Goessel High School offers several athletic programs including basketball (boys and girls), cross country (boys and girls), football (8-man), golf (boys and girls), track and field (boys and girls), and volleyball. The school competes in the Wheat State League and is a member of the KSHSAA.

==== Boys basketball ====
In 1988, the boys basketball team won the 1A state championship.

==== Volleyball ====
The volleyball team won the Class 1A Kansas state championship in 2015.

==== Cross Country ====
The boys' cross country team won the 1A state meet in 1976, Goessel's first team state championship. The girls' cross country team won the 1A state meet in 2016.

== See also ==
- List of high schools in Kansas
- List of unified school districts in Kansas
