= Pleasant Township, Harvey County, Kansas =

Township in Kansas, United States

Pleasant Township Harvey County, Kansas
- Township
- Location within Harvey County

- Location within state of Kansas
- Coordinates: 38°2′35″N 97°12′31″W
- Country: United States
- State: Kansas
- County: Harvey

Area
  - Total: 36.36 sq mi (94.18 km^{2})
  - Land: 36.07 sq mi (93.41 km^{2})
  - Water: 0.30 sq mi (0.77 km^{2}) 0.82%
- Elevation: 1,437 ft (438 m)

Population (2020)
  - Total: 457
  - Density: 12.7/sq mi (4.89/km^{2})
- Time zone: UTC-6 (CST)
  - Summer (DST): UTC-5 (CDT)
- FIPS code: 20-56250
- GNIS ID: 473696
- Website: County website

Pleasant Township is a township in Harvey County, Kansas, United States. As of the 2020 census, its population was 457.

== Geography ==
Pleasant Township covers an area of 36.36 square miles (94.2 km^{2}) and contains no incorporated settlements. The stream of Walnut Creek runs through this township.

== Cemeteries ==
According to the USGS, it contains one cemetery, Mission.
