= Dyck Arboretum of the Plains =

Botanical garden in Hesston, Kansas, United States

Coordinates: 38.1294°N 97.4340°W

- Interactive map of Dyck Arboretum of the Plains
- Website: Official website

The Dyck Arboretum of the Plains is a 29-acre botanical garden at Hesston College in Hesston, Kansas, United States. It was established October 11, 1981, to feature native Kansan plants and trees, and now contains more than 600 species of native and adaptable trees, shrubs, wildflowers, and grasses.

The Arboretum contains plant varieties from all the major grassland biomes of central North America, including wildflowers of the Great Plains, a buffalograss meadow, beds of tallgrass, shortgrass and mixed-grass prairie plants.

== See also ==
- List of botanical gardens in the United States
