= Hesston USD 460 =

Public school district in Hesston, Kansas

Address
- 150 N. Ridge Rd. Hesston, Kansas, 67062; United States
- Coordinates: 38°8′23″N 97°25′25″W

District information
- Type: Public
- Grades: K to 12
- School board: 3

Other information
- Website: hesstonschools.org

Hesston High School

Location
- 200 North Ridge Road; Hesston, (Harvey County), Kansas 67062; United States

Information
- Type: Public high school
- Principal: Jordan Leiker
- Staff: 18.45 (FTE)
- Enrollment: 259 (2023-24)
- Student to teacher ratio: 14.04
- Colors: Black and red
- Nickname: Swathers
- Website: Hesston High School

Hesston USD 460 is a public unified school district headquartered in Hesston, Kansas, United States. The district includes the communities of Hesston, Zimmerdale, and nearby rural areas.

== Schools ==
The school district operates the following schools:

- Hesston High School
- Hesston Middle School
- Hesston Elementary School

== See also ==
- Kansas State Department of Education
- Kansas State High School Activities Association
- List of high schools in Kansas
- List of unified school districts in Kansas
