= Macon Township, Kansas =

Township in Kansas, United States

Macon Township Harvey County, Kansas
- Township
- Location within Harvey County

- Location within state of Kansas
- Coordinates: 38°2′35″N 97°25′36″W
- Country: United States
- State: Kansas
- County: Harvey

Area
  - Total: 35.50 sq mi (91.95 km^{2})
  - Land: 35.50 sq mi (91.95 km^{2})
  - Water: 0 sq mi (0 km^{2}) 0%
- Elevation: 1,414 ft (431 m)

Population (2020)
  - Total: 498
  - Density: 14.0/sq mi (5.42/km^{2})
- Time zone: UTC-6 (CST)
  - Summer (DST): UTC-5 (CDT)
- GNIS ID: 473695
- Website: County website

Macon Township is a township in Harvey County, Kansas, United States. As of the 2020 census, its population was 498.

== Geography ==
Macon Township covers an area of 35.5 square miles (92 km^{2}) and contains no incorporated settlements. According to the USGS, it contains two cemeteries: Restlawn Garden of Memory and Royer. The streams of Dry Creek, Emma Creeks (West, the largest, Middle, and East) run through the township.
