= Lake Township, Kansas =

Township in Kansas, United States

Lake Township Harvey County, Kansas
- Township
- Location within Harvey County

- Location within state of Kansas
- Coordinates: 37°57′20″N 97°38′51″W
- Country: United States
- State: Kansas
- County: Harvey

Area
  - Total: 36.05 sq mi (93.36 km^{2})
  - Land: 35.67 sq mi (92.38 km^{2})
  - Water: 0.38 sq mi (0.98 km^{2}) 1.05%
- Elevation: 1,434 ft (437 m)

Population (2020)
  - Total: 170
  - Density: 4.8/sq mi (1.8/km^{2})
- Time zone: UTC-6 (CST)
  - Summer (DST): UTC-5 (CDT)
- FIPS code: 20-37825
- GNIS ID: 473670
- Website: County website

Lake Township is a township in Harvey County, Kansas, United States. As of the 2020 census, its population was 170.

== Geography ==
Lake Township covers an area of 36.05 square miles (93.4 km^{2}), and contains the unincorporated community of Patterson. According to the USGS, it contains one cemetery, Hunt. Greenfield Lake and Saucer Lake are within the township.
