= Halstead Township, Kansas =

Township in Kansas, United States

Halstead Township Harvey County, Kansas
- Township
- Location within Harvey County

- Location within state of Kansas
- Coordinates: 38°2′35″N 97°32′11″W
- Country: United States
- State: Kansas
- County: Harvey

Area
  - Total: 35.43 sq mi (91.77 km^{2})
  - Land: 35.4 sq mi (91.7 km^{2})
  - Water: 0.027 sq mi (0.07 km^{2}) 0.08%
- Elevation: 1,401 ft (427 m)

Population (2020)
  - Total: 392
  - Density: 11.1/sq mi (4.27/km^{2})
- Time zone: UTC-6 (CST)
  - Summer (DST): UTC-5 (CDT)
- FIPS code: 20-29625
- GNIS ID: 473682
- Website: County website

Halstead Township is a township in Harvey County, Kansas, United States. As of the 2020 census, its population was 392.

== Geography ==
Halstead Township covers an area of 35.43 square miles (91.8 km^{2}) and contains one incorporated settlement, Halstead. According to the USGS, it contains one cemetery, Halstead. The stream of Black Kettle Creek runs through this township.
