= Bruce DeHaven =

American football coach (1948–2016)

Personal information
- Born: September 6, 1948; Trousdale, Kansas
- Died: December 27, 2016 (aged 68); Orchard Park, New York

Career information
- College: Southwestern College

Career history
- Kansas (1979–1981) (OL/DB); New Mexico State (1982) (OL); New Jersey Generals (1983) (Asst. OL/ST); Pittsburgh Maulers (1984) (OL/ST); Orlando Renegades (1985) (RB/ST); Buffalo Bills (1987–1999) (ST); San Francisco 49ers (2000–2002) (ST); Dallas Cowboys (2003–2006) (ST); Seattle Seahawks (2007–2009) (ST); Buffalo Bills (2010–2012) (ST); Carolina Panthers (2013–2016) (ST)

Bruce Leroy DeHaven (September 6, 1948 – December 27, 2016) was an American football coach. Specializing in special teams coaching, DeHaven held that position for five teams in the National Football League, his longest tenure being 16 seasons over two runs with the Buffalo Bills.

== Coaching career ==
DeHaven began his coaching career at Oxford High School in Oxford, Kansas. DeHaven then moved on to be the defensive back and offensive line coach in addition to the recruiting coordinator at Kansas. He served as the offensive line coach and recruiting coordinator at New Mexico State.

DeHaven began his professional coaching career in the United States Football League, serving as the assistant offensive line coach and special teams coordinator for the New Jersey Generals in 1983, the Pittsburgh Maulers in 1984 and the Orlando Renegades in 1985.

In 1987, DeHaven was hired as the Buffalo Bills special teams coordinator and spent 13 seasons with the Bills under that capacity and was a part of a Bills staff that won four consecutive AFC Championships. While DeHaven was the Bills special teams coordinator, kicker Steve Christie set Bills team records in 1998 with 140 points and 33 made field goals and became the franchise's all-time leading scorer. Also under DeHaven's coaching, 7-time gunner Steve Tasker, who was revered as one of the NFL's most fierce tacklers, had his best seasons. However, DeHaven's tenure also included notable special teams miscues. Scott Norwood's missed kick in Super Bowl XXV cost the Bills the game. In a 1999 NFL Wild Card game, the Tennessee Titans performed a successful trick play, the Music City Miracle, that led to a Bills defeat. After the 1999 season, DeHaven was fired.

After his firing by the Bills, he was the special teams coordinator for San Francisco 49ers from 2000 to 2002, the Dallas Cowboys from 2003 to 2006, and the Seattle Seahawks from 2007 to 2009 before joining the Bills again in 2010 until 2012.

In 2013, DeHaven was hired as the Carolina Panthers assistant special teams coordinator before being elevated to special teams coordinator in 2014. During his time with the Panthers, punter Brad Nortman set team records for net average (41.6 yards per punt) and gross average (47.8 yards per punt). Kicker Graham Gano set team records with 6 kicks of 50 or more yards, and touchback percentage on kickoffs (79.7 yards per kick). Punt returner Ted Ginn Jr. also set a team record with 12.2 yards per punt. Long snapper J. J. Jansen was also named a Pro Bowler under DeHaven's coaching.

In the 2015 season, DeHaven and the Panthers reached Super Bowl 50 on February 7, 2016. The Panthers fell to the Denver Broncos by a score of 24–10.

== Illness and death ==
In May 2015, DeHaven was diagnosed with terminal prostate cancer and was told he had anywhere from five months to five years to live.

DeHaven died December 27, 2016, at his home in Orchard Park, New York.
