= Jesse B. Martin =

Canadian bishop

- Born: December 22, 1897; St Jacobs, Ontario, Canada
- Died: March 4, 1974 (aged 76); Waterloo, Ontario, Canada
- Education: Hesston College, Kansas, 1923-24; Goshen College, 1924
- Occupation(s): pastor, Erb Street Mennonite Church, Waterloo, 1929-64; teacher, Ontario Mennonite Bible School and Institute, 1932-65; church worker, administrator

Jesse Bauman Martin (22 December 1897 – 4 March 1974) was a Canadian bishop, teacher, and church worker, known for playing "a key role in the creation and operation of an alternative service plan for Canadian conscientious objectors" soon after Canada entered World War II.

With Samuel Coffman and others in Ontario, Martin helped to create in 1940 the Conference of Historic Peace Churches, and he became its "most active member and spokesman", as chairman of the Military Problems Committee.

His negotiations with the Canadian government helped lead to the beginnings of an Alternative Service program in summer 1941, and then as camps were established he traveled nationwide to organize and encourage the camps' conscientious objectors.
