= Harvey County, Kansas =

County in Kansas, United States

- County
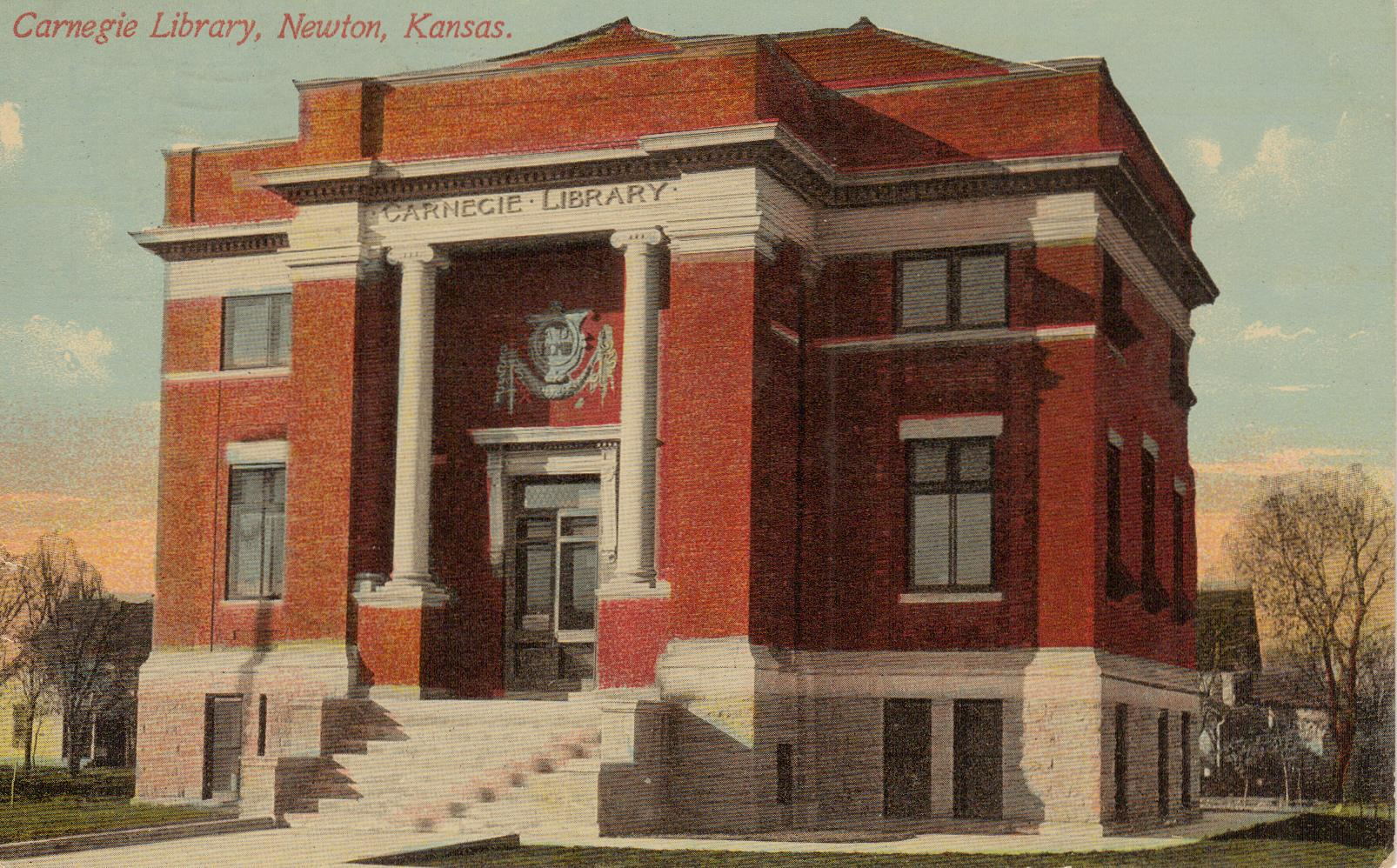
- Former Carnegie Library in Newton, currently is the Harvey County Historical Museum

- Location within the U.S. state of Kansas
- Coordinates: 38°03′N 97°26′W
- Country: United States
- State: Kansas
- Founded: March 7, 1872
- Named for: James Harvey
- Seat: Newton
- Largest city: Newton

Area
  - Total: 541 sq mi (1,400 km^{2})
  - Land: 540 sq mi (1,400 km^{2})

Population (2020)
  - Total: 34,024
  - Estimate (2025): 33,580 ▼
  - Density: 63/sq mi (24/km^{2})
- Time zone: UTC−6 (Central)
  - Summer (DST): UTC−5 (CDT)
- Congressional district: 4th
- Website: www.harveycounty.gov

Harvey County is a county located in the U.S. state of Kansas. Its county seat and most populous city is Newton. As of the 2020 census, the county population was 34,024. The county was named for James Harvey, a U.S. senator and the fifth governor of Kansas.

== History ==
In 1854, the Kansas Territory was organized, then in 1861 Kansas became the 34th U.S. state.

In 1871, the Atchison, Topeka and Santa Fe Railway extended a main line from Emporia to Newton. The next year, in 1872, Harvey County was founded from portions of McPherson, Marion, and Sedgwick counties, and named in honor of the fifth Governor of Kansas, James M. Harvey, with Newton designated the county seat.

The first settlers arrived in 1869, and by 1871, there was already significant pressure to organize a new county in what was then the northern portion of Sedgwick County, an effort which succeeded in 1872. The early years of Harvey County's government were dogged by persistent public discontent over missing records and financial irregularities, but by the mid-1870s confidence in the county's government was restored and the county grew rapidly, particularly with the arrival of large numbers of Mennonite settlers in 1872.

The county developed quickly, with churches, schools, and businesses established within a few years of its founding. Despite early hardship from prairie fires, storms, and the devastating grasshopper plague of 1874, Harvey County rebounded with strong agricultural output and infrastructure improvements. The county's abundant water resources, fertile farmland, and natural materials like gypsum and limestone further strengthened its economy. By 1910, Harvey County had a population of 19,200 and no public debt, a rare achievement among Kansas counties at that time.

== Geography ==
According to the U.S. Census Bureau, the county has a total area of 541 square miles (1,400 km^{2}), of which 540 square miles (1,400 km^{2}) is land and 1.0 square mile (2.6 km^{2}) (0.2%) is water. The Little Arkansas River flows through the county.

=== Adjacent counties ===
- Marion County (northeast)
- Butler County (east)
- Sedgwick County (south)
- Reno County (west)
- McPherson County (northwest)

== Demographics ==
Historical population
Census	Pop.	Note	%±
1880	11,451		—
1890	17,601		53.7%
1900	17,591		−0.1%
1910	19,200		9.1%
1920	20,744		8.0%
1930	22,120		6.6%
1940	21,712		−1.8%
1950	21,698		−0.1%
1960	25,865		19.2%
1970	27,236		5.3%
1980	30,531		12.1%
1990	31,028		1.6%
2000	32,869		5.9%
2010	34,684		5.5%
2020	34,024		−1.9%
2025 (est.)	33,580	▼	−1.3%
U.S. Decennial Census; 1790-1960 1900-1990; 1990-2000 2010-2020

Harvey County is part of the Wichita metropolitan area.

=== Racial and ethnic composition ===
Harvey County, Kansas – Racial and ethnic composition Note: the US Census treats Hispanic/Latino as an ethnic category. This table excludes Latinos from the racial categories and assigns them to a separate category. Hispanics/Latinos may be of any race.
Race / Ethnicity (NH = Non-Hispanic)	Pop 1980	Pop 1990	Pop 2000	Pop 2010	Pop 2020	% 1980	% 1990	% 2000	% 2010	% 2020
White alone (NH)	28,487	28,516	28,973	29,332	27,349	93.31%	91.90%	88.15%	84.57%	80.38%
Black or African American alone (NH)	478	524	502	530	596	1.57%	1.69%	1.53%	1.53%	1.75%
Native American or Alaska Native alone (NH)	100	141	148	181	183	0.33%	0.45%	0.45%	0.52%	0.54%
Asian alone (NH)	108	207	169	253	260	0.35%	0.67%	0.51%	0.73%	0.76%
Native Hawaiian or Pacific Islander alone (NH)	x	x	9	10	10	x	x	0.03%	0.03%	0.03%
Other race alone (NH)	115	24	27	24	82	0.38%	0.08%	0.08%	0.07%	0.24%
Mixed race or Multiracial (NH)	x	x	421	607	1,489	x	x	1.28%	1.75%	4.38%
Hispanic or Latino (any race)	1,243	1,616	2,620	3,747	4,055	4.07%	5.21%	7.97%	10.80%	11.92%
Total	30,531	31,028	32,869	34,684	34,024	100.00%	100.00%	100.00%	100.00%	100.00%

=== 2020 census ===
As of the 2020 census, the county had a population of 34,024. The median age was 40.7 years. 23.8% of residents were under the age of 18 and 20.9% of residents were 65 years of age or older.

For every 100 females there were 96.4 males, and for every 100 females age 18 and over there were 94.3 males age 18 and over. 59.9% of residents lived in urban areas, while 40.1% lived in rural areas.

The racial makeup of the county was 84.2% White, 1.9% Black or African American, 0.8% American Indian and Alaska Native, 0.8% Asian, 0.0% Native Hawaiian and Pacific Islander, 4.4% from some other race, and 7.9% from two or more races. Hispanic or Latino residents of any race comprised 11.9% of the population.

There were 13,363 households in the county, of which 30.0% had children under the age of 18 living with them and 24.0% had a female householder with no spouse or partner present. About 28.0% of all households were made up of individuals and 13.5% had someone living alone who was 65 years of age or older.

There were 14,569 housing units, of which 8.3% were vacant. Among occupied housing units, 69.6% were owner-occupied and 30.4% were renter-occupied. The homeowner vacancy rate was 2.0% and the rental vacancy rate was 10.2%.

=== 2000 census ===
As of the 2000 census, there were 32,869 people, 12,581 households, and 8,932 families residing in the county. The population density was 61 inhabitants per square mile (24/km^{2}). There were 13,378 housing units at an average density of 25 per square mile (9.7/km^{2}). The racial makeup of the county was 91.04% White, 1.59% Black or African American, 0.52% Native American, 0.52% Asian, 0.03% Pacific Islander, 4.17% from other races, and 2.14% from two or more races. Hispanic or Latino of any race were 7.97% of the population.

There were 12,581 households, out of which 32.80% had children under the age of 18 living with them, 60.20% were married couples living together, 7.70% had a female householder with no husband present, and 29.00% were non-families. 25.80% of all households were made up of individuals, and 11.60% had someone living alone who was 65 years of age or older. The average household size was 2.50 and the average family size was 3.00.

In the county, the population was spread out, with 26.00% under the age of 18, 9.10% from 18 to 24, 26.50% from 25 to 44, 21.60% from 45 to 64, and 16.80% who were 65 years of age or older. The median age was 38 years. For every 100 females, there were 94.50 males. For every 100 females age 18 and over, there were 91.60 males.

The median income for a household in the county was $40,907, and the median income for a family was $48,793. Males had a median income of $35,037 versus $22,492 for females. The per capita income for the county was $18,715. About 4.20% of families and 6.40% of the population were below the poverty line, including 7.50% of those under age 18 and 5.00% of those age 65 or over.

== Government ==
=== Presidential elections ===
Presidential election results

United States presidential election results for Harvey County, Kansas
Year	Republican		Democratic		Third party(ies)	
Year	No.	%	No.	%	No.	%
1888	2,145	54.25%	1,065	26.93%	744	18.82%
1892	2,025	52.80%	0	0.00%	1,810	47.20%
1896	2,082	54.57%	1,678	43.98%	55	1.44%
1900	2,266	56.65%	1,658	41.45%	76	1.90%
1904	2,362	70.66%	690	20.64%	291	8.70%
1908	2,305	58.30%	1,475	37.30%	174	4.40%
1912	703	17.70%	1,499	37.74%	1,770	44.56%
1916	3,479	48.98%	3,131	44.08%	493	6.94%
1920	4,454	63.09%	2,457	34.80%	149	2.11%
1924	4,499	58.96%	1,744	22.86%	1,387	18.18%
1928	6,330	77.62%	1,748	21.43%	77	0.94%
1932	4,192	49.28%	4,091	48.09%	224	2.63%
1936	4,456	45.28%	5,357	54.44%	28	0.28%
1940	5,539	56.76%	4,087	41.88%	133	1.36%
1944	5,339	61.35%	3,300	37.92%	64	0.74%
1948	5,270	57.72%	3,615	39.59%	245	2.68%
1952	7,154	70.87%	2,726	27.00%	215	2.13%
1956	7,367	70.20%	3,084	29.39%	43	0.41%
1960	7,798	68.38%	3,537	31.02%	69	0.61%
1964	4,979	47.81%	5,306	50.95%	130	1.25%
1968	6,682	61.64%	3,351	30.91%	808	7.45%
1972	8,287	67.23%	3,555	28.84%	485	3.93%
1976	6,624	51.00%	6,003	46.22%	360	2.77%
1980	7,045	54.56%	4,173	32.32%	1,694	13.12%
1984	8,507	64.06%	4,599	34.63%	174	1.31%
1988	6,893	54.23%	5,503	43.29%	315	2.48%
1992	6,259	41.71%	5,047	33.63%	3,700	24.66%
1996	8,382	57.79%	4,918	33.91%	1,204	8.30%
2000	8,271	60.44%	4,591	33.55%	822	6.01%
2004	9,534	63.10%	5,331	35.28%	245	1.62%
2008	9,006	57.40%	6,318	40.27%	367	2.34%
2012	8,588	60.08%	5,373	37.59%	333	2.33%
2016	8,668	58.11%	5,068	33.98%	1,180	7.91%
2020	10,182	58.52%	6,747	38.78%	470	2.70%
2024	9,591	59.62%	6,202	38.56%	293	1.82%

=== Laws ===
Following amendment to the Kansas Constitution in 1986, the county remained a prohibition, or "dry", county until 1996, when voters approved the sale of alcoholic liquor by the individual drink with a 30% food sales requirement.

The county voted "No" on the 2022 Kansas abortion referendum, an anti-abortion ballot measure, by 53% to 47% despite backing Donald Trump with 59% of the vote to Joe Biden's 39% in the 2020 presidential election.

== Education ==
=== Colleges ===
- Bethel College in North Newton
- Hesston College in Hesston

=== Unified school districts ===
- Burrton USD 369
- Newton USD 373
- Sedgwick USD 439
- Halstead–Bentley USD 440
- Hesston USD 460

School district office in neighboring county

- Remington USD 206
- Peabody–Burns USD 398
- Goessel USD 411
- Moundridge USD 423

== Communities ==
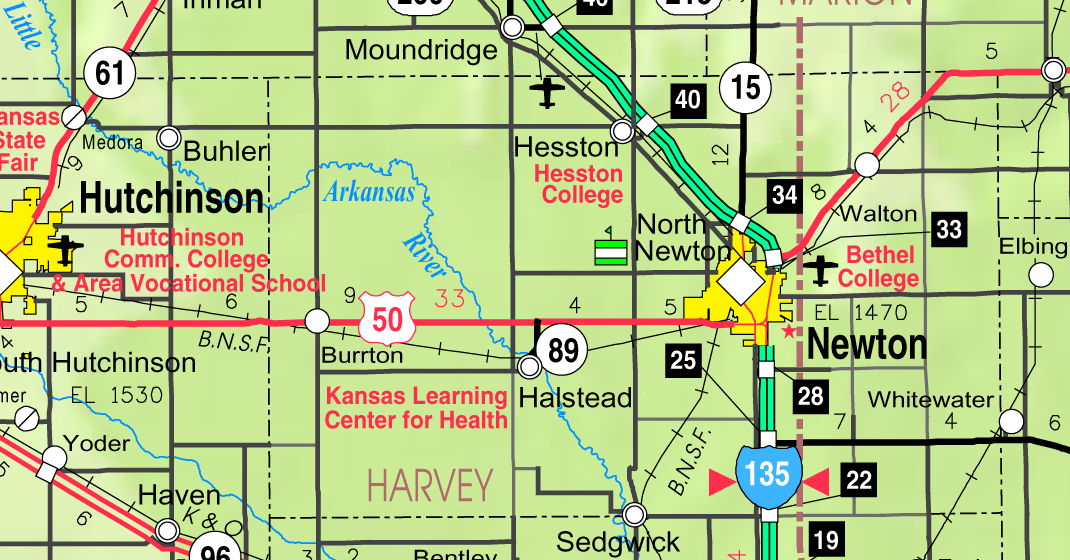
2005 map of Harvey County (map legend)

List of townships / incorporated cities / unincorporated communities / extinct former communities within Harvey County.

=== Cities ===
‡ means a community has portions in an adjacent county.

- Burrton
- Halstead
- Hesston
- Newton (county seat)
- North Newton
- Sedgwick‡
- Walton

=== Unincorporated communities ===
- McLain
- Patterson
- Putnam
- Zimmerdale

=== Ghost towns ===
- Annelly
- Braddock
- Lehman
- Paxton
- Van Arsdale

=== Townships ===
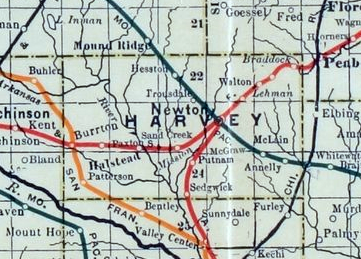
1915 railroad map

Harvey County is divided into fifteen townships. The cities of Halstead and Newton are considered governmentally independent and are excluded from the census figures for the townships. In the following table, the population center is the largest city (or cities) included in that township's population total, if it is of a significant size.

Township	FIPS	Population center	Population	Population density /km^{2} (/sq mi)	Land area km^{2} (sq mi)	Water area km^{2} (sq mi)	Water %	Geographic coordinates
Alta	01500		221	2 (6)	93 (36)	0 (0)	0.48%	38°7′27″N 97°38′44″W
Burrton	09600		1,143	12 (32)	93 (36)	0 (0)	0.17%	38°1′32″N 97°39′55″W
Darlington	17025		601	7 (17)	92 (35)	0 (0)	0.10%	37°57′5″N 97°19′32″W
Emma	21025		4,181	45 (116)	93 (36)	0 (0)	0%	38°8′10″N 97°25′46″W
Garden	25300		294	3 (8)	93 (36)	0 (0)	0%	38°7′44″N 97°32′14″W
Halstead	29625		353	4 (10)	92 (35)	0 (0)	0.07%	38°2′9″N 97°31′51″W
Highland	31875		415	5 (12)	92 (35)	0 (0)	0.19%	38°7′38″N 97°19′9″W
Lake	37825		173	2 (5)	92 (36)	1 (0)	1.05%	37°57′46″N 97°39′7″W
Lakin	38150		357	4 (10)	92 (35)	0 (0)	0.06%	37°57′18″N 97°32′20″W
Macon	43925		1,056	11 (30)	92 (36)	0 (0)	0%	38°2′8″N 97°24′58″W
Newton	50500		1,950	28 (73)	69 (27)	0 (0)	0.07%	38°3′27″N 97°19′31″W
Pleasant	56250		439	5 (12)	93 (36)	1 (0)	0.81%	38°2′27″N 97°12′8″W
Richland	59350		360	4 (10)	94 (36)	0 (0)	0.20%	37°57′39″N 97°12′1″W
Sedgwick	63825		1,711	18 (48)	93 (36)	0 (0)	0%	37°56′24″N 97°25′22″W
Walton	75225		552	6 (15)	95 (37)	0 (0)	0.06%	38°7′26″N 97°13′1″W
Sources: "Census 2000 U.S. Gazetteer Files". U.S. Census Bureau, Geography Division. Archived from the original on August 2, 2002.

== See also ==
- National Register of Historic Places listings in Harvey County, Kansas
- List of people from Harvey County, Kansas
- March 1990 Central US tornado outbreak
- Chisholm Trail
