= Alta Township, Kansas =

Township in Kansas, United States

Alta Township Harvey County, Kansas
- Township
- Location within Harvey County

- Location within state of Kansas
- Coordinates: 38°8′0″N 97°38′31″W
- Country: United States
- State: Kansas
- County: Harvey

Area
  - Total: 36.03 sq mi (93.31 km^{2})
  - Land: 35.85 sq mi (92.86 km^{2})
  - Water: 0.17 sq mi (0.45 km^{2}) 0.48%
- Elevation: 1,450 ft (440 m)

Population (2020)
  - Total: 221
  - Density: 6.16/sq mi (2.38/km^{2})
- Time zone: UTC-6 (CST)
  - Summer (DST): UTC-5 (CDT)
- FIPS code: 20-01500
- GNIS ID: 477740
- Website: County website

Alta Township is a township in Harvey County, Kansas, United States. As of the 2020 census, its population was 221.

== Geography ==
Alta Township covers an area of 36.03 square miles (93.3 km^{2}) and contains no incorporated settlements. According to the USGS, it contains one cemetery, Hebron. The streams of Big Slough, Blaze Fork, Sand Creek and Turkey Creek run through this township.
