= Hesston, Kansas =

City in Harvey County, Kansas

- City
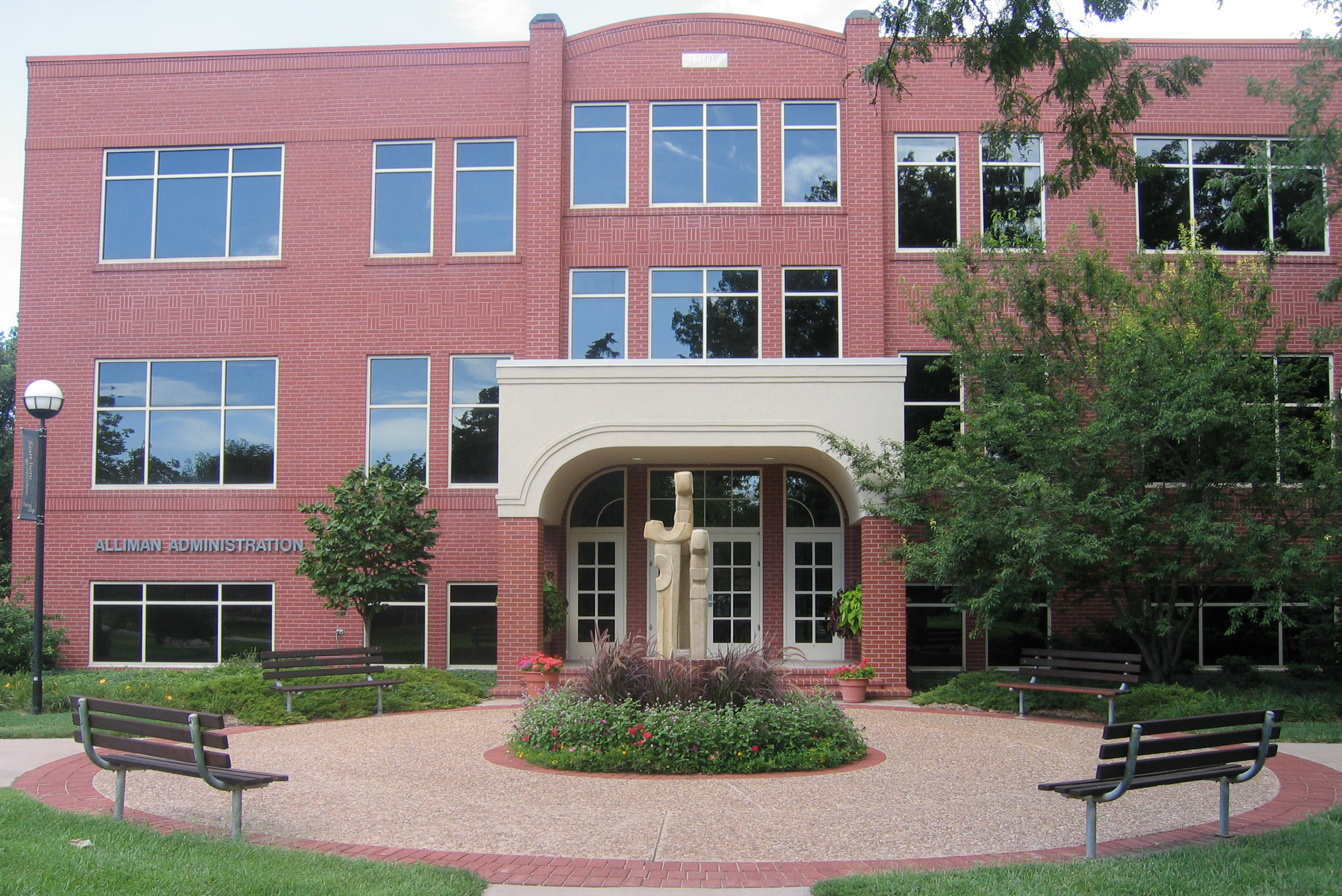
- Alliman Center on Hesston College campus

- Location within Harvey County and Kansas

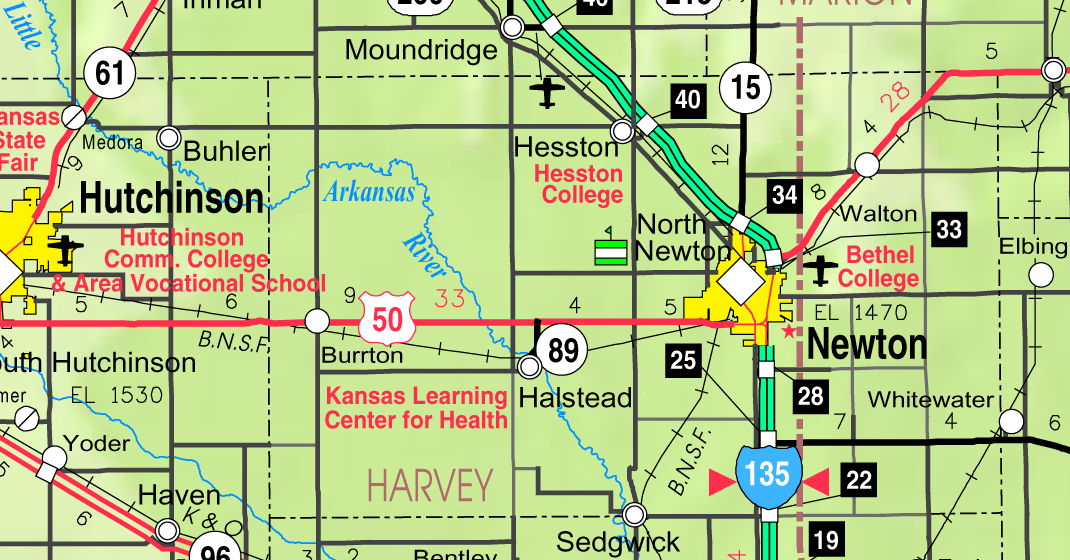
- KDOT map of Harvey County (legend)
- Coordinates: 38°08′24″N 97°25′37″W
- Country: United States
- State: Kansas
- County: Harvey
- Township: Emma
- Founded: 1886
- Incorporated: 1921
- Named for: Hess brothers

Government
  - Type: Mayor–Council

Area
  - Total: 3.56 sq mi (9.23 km^{2})
  - Land: 3.56 sq mi (9.23 km^{2})
  - Water: 0 sq mi (0.00 km^{2})
- Elevation: 1,476 ft (450 m)

Population (2020)
  - Total: 3,505
  - Density: 984/sq mi (380/km^{2})
- Time zone: UTC-6 (CST)
  - Summer (DST): UTC-5 (CDT)
- ZIP Code: 67062
- Area code: 620
- FIPS code: 20-31600
- GNIS ID: 2394366
- Website: www.hesstonks.gov

Hesston is a city in Harvey County, Kansas, United States. As of the 2020 census, the population of the city was 3,505. Large manufacturing facilities for AGCO (farm equipment) and Stanley Black & Decker (lawn mowers) are located in Hesston. It is home of Hesston College.

== History ==
=== Early history ===
For many millennia, the Great Plains of North America was inhabited by nomadic Native Americans. From the 16th century to 18th century, the Kingdom of France claimed ownership of large parts of North America. In 1762, after the French and Indian War, France secretly ceded New France to Spain, per the Treaty of Fontainebleau.

=== 19th century ===
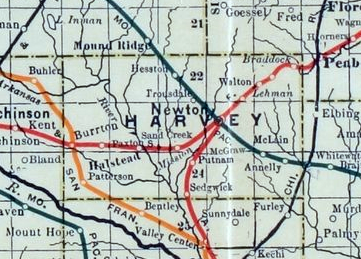
1915 railroad map of Harvey County

In 1802, Spain returned most of the land to France. In 1803, most of the land for modern day Kansas was acquired by the United States from France as part of the 828,000 square mile Louisiana Purchase for 2.83 cents per acre.

In 1854, the Kansas Territory was organized, and in 1861, Kansas became the 34th U.S. state. In 1872, Harvey County was established within the Kansas Territory which included the land for modern day Hesston.

A post office was established as Elivon on February 10, 1873. It then moved near the current city site on April 24, 1878.

In 1886, Hesston was founded and named after the Hess brothers who owned the land where a depot on the Missouri Pacific Railroad was built. The post office was renamed to Hesston on December 16, 1887. Due to the railroad, Hesston became an important regional shipping point.

=== 20th century ===
In 1909, the Mennonite Church founded the Hesston College, because many of the early settlers were Mennonite farmers.

In 1947, Lyle Yost and Adin Holdemann founded the farm equipment company Hesston Manufacturing Company. In 1991, AGCO Corporation purchased the company. In 1960, John Regier founded the lawn mower company Excel Industries.

In 1981, the Dyck Arboretum of the Plains was founded at the Hesston College.

On March 13, 1990, a large portion of Hesston was damaged by an F5 tornado during a tornado outbreak. A total of 226 homes and 21 businesses were destroyed, and several were swept completely from their foundations. 20 farms were torn apart in rural areas outside of Hesston. Light debris from Hesston was found 115 miles (185 km) away in Nebraska. One person died and 59 people were injured. After passing through Hesston, the tornado merged with a new tornado that did F5 damage near the town of Goessel. The severity of the damage left behind by this tornado led some meteorologists to believe that the Goessel tornado was among the strongest ever documented at that time.

=== 21st century ===
On February 25, 2016, Hesston became the scene of a mass shooting in which three people were killed and twelve others injured at an Excel Industries building. Prior to that shooting, other shooting incidents occurred at the nearby city of Newton and also Old U.S. Route 81, in which two people were wounded. The shooter was identified as Excel employee Cedric Larry Ford, who was killed by responding police officers.

In 2021, Stanley Black & Decker acquired Excel Industries.

== Geography ==
According to the United States Census Bureau, the city has a total area of 3.90 square miles (10.10 km^{2}), all land.

=== Climate ===
The climate in this area is characterized by hot, humid summers and generally mild to cool winters. According to the Köppen Climate Classification system, Hesston has a humid subtropical climate, abbreviated "Cfa" on climate maps.

== Demographics ==
Historical population
Census	Pop.	Note	%±
1930	526		—
1940	403		−23.4%
1950	686		70.2%
1960	1,103		60.8%
1970	1,926		74.6%
1980	3,013		56.4%
1990	3,012		0.0%
2000	3,509		16.5%
2010	3,709		5.7%
2020	3,505		−5.5%
U.S. Decennial Census

=== 2020 census ===
As of the 2020 census, Hesston had a population of 3,505. The census counted 1,357 households and 945 families in the city.

The median age was 41.9 years. 23.6% of residents were under the age of 18, 8.4% were from 18 to 24, 21.1% were from 25 to 44, 21.0% were from 45 to 64, and 25.9% were 65 years of age or older. For every 100 females there were 91.6 males, and for every 100 females age 18 and over there were 88.1 males.

0.0% of residents lived in urban areas, while 100.0% lived in rural areas.

There were 1,357 households, of which 30.7% had children under the age of 18 living in them. Of all households, 60.0% were married-couple households, 13.2% were households with a male householder and no spouse or partner present, and 24.1% were households with a female householder and no spouse or partner present. About 28.3% of all households were made up of individuals and 16.0% had someone living alone who was 65 years of age or older.

There were 1,454 housing units, of which 6.7% were vacant. The homeowner vacancy rate was 2.1% and the rental vacancy rate was 8.7%. The population density was 983.2 per square mile (379.6/km^{2}), and there were 407.9 housing units per square mile (157.5/km^{2}).

Racial composition as of the 2020 census
Race	Number	Percent
White	3,155	90.0%
Black or African American	57	1.6%
American Indian and Alaska Native	21	0.6%
Asian	59	1.7%
Native Hawaiian and Other Pacific Islander	0	0.0%
Some other race	66	1.9%
Two or more races	147	4.2%
Hispanic or Latino (of any race)	161	4.6%

Non-Hispanic White residents were 88.53% of the population.

=== Demographic estimates ===
The average household size was 2.4 and the average family size was 2.9. The percent of those with a bachelor's degree or higher was estimated to be 30.6% of the population.

=== Income and poverty ===
The 2016–2020 5-year American Community Survey estimates show that the median household income was $50,644 (with a margin of error of +/- $10,797) and the median family income was $69,432 (+/- $24,126). Females had a median income of $25,772 (+/- $7,009). The median income for those above 16 years old was $26,065 (+/- $10,118). Approximately, 8.9% of families and 10.8% of the population were below the poverty line, including 8.2% of those under the age of 18 and 1.8% of those ages 65 or over.

=== 2010 census ===
As of the census of 2010, there were 3,709 people, 1,345 households, and 972 families residing in the city. The population density was 951.0 inhabitants per square mile (367.2/km^{2}). There were 1,433 housing units at an average density of 367.4 per square mile (141.9/km^{2}). The racial makeup of the city was 92.7% White, 1.6% African American, 0.6% Native American, 1.7% Asian, 1.5% from other races, and 1.9% from two or more races. Hispanic or Latino of any race were 4.5% of the population.

There were 1,345 households, of which 32.7% had children under the age of 18 living with them, 62.4% were married couples living together, 7.4% had a female householder with no husband present, 2.5% had a male householder with no wife present, and 27.7% were non-families. 25.4% of all households were made up of individuals, and 13.3% had someone living alone who was 65 years of age or older. The average household size was 2.48 and the average family size was 2.96.

The median age in the city was 37.2 years. 24.3% of residents were under the age of 18; 12.7% were between the ages of 18 and 24; 20.8% were from 25 to 44; 22.6% were from 45 to 64; and 19.6% were 65 years of age or older. The gender makeup of the city was 49.0% male and 51.0% female.

== Economy ==
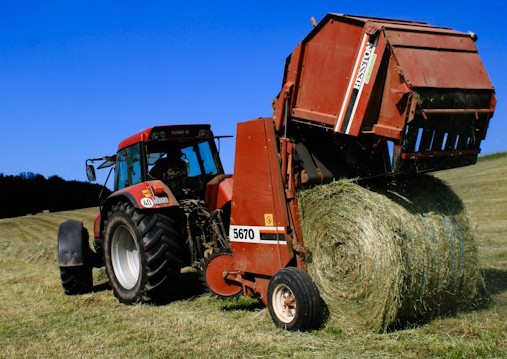
Hesston 5670 round baler

The two largest companies in Hesston are AGCO (Hesston Corp) and Excel Industries (Hustler).

In 1947, Lyle Yost founded the farm equipment company Hesston Manufacturing Company. In 1955, it introduced the first commercially available self-propelled windrower, then in 1967 it introduced the first hydrostatic drive windrower. In 1978, it introduced the first large square baler, then in 1988 it introduced the first totally automatically large round baler. In 1974, the Hesston Company commissioned its first belt buckles, which became popular on the rodeo circuit and with collectors. The company's controlling stake was sold to Italian corporation Fiat Trattori in 1977. The remainder of the company was purchased in 1987 by the same firm. In 1991, the American-based equipment manufacturer AGCO Corporation purchased Hesston Corporation and later expanded the manufacturing facilities.

In 1960, John Regier founded the lawn mower company Excel Industries. The company manufactures outdoor equipment, primarily Hustler and Big Dog mowers. The original Hustler was the world's first twin-lever, zero-turn mower. In 2021, Stanley Black & Decker acquired Excel.

== Government ==
The Hesston government consists of a mayor and five council members. The council meets the 2nd Monday of each month at 6 pm.

- City Hall, 115 E Smith.

== Arts and culture ==
- Dyck Arboretum of the Plains, a botanical garden at Hesston College.
  - Prairie Window Concert Series
  - Summer Music Nights
- Hesston Public Library, named the "Best Small Public Library in Kansas" by the Kansas Library Association in 2015.
- Sunflower Performing Arts at Hesston College (formerly Hesston-Bethel Performing Arts)
- Central Kansas Master Chorale
- Kansas Mennonite Men's Chorus

== Parks and Recreation ==
- Eight city parks, including an 18-hole golf course, disc golf course, and a dog park.
- Additional disc golf course on Hesston College campus

== Education ==
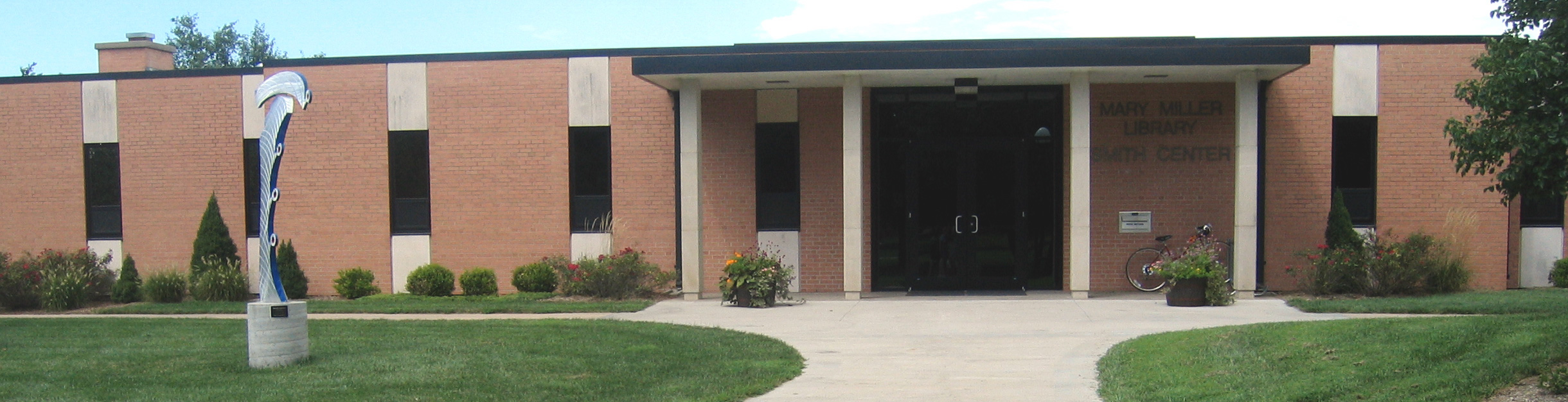
Mary Miller Library at Hesston College (2007)

=== Primary and secondary education ===
The community is served by Hesston USD 460 public school district. It has three schools:

- Hesston High School, 200 N. Ridge Road, Hesston.
- Hesston Middle School, 200 N. Ridge Road, Hesston.
- Hesston Elementary School, 300 E. Amos, Hesston.

=== College ===
- Hesston College

== Media ==
=== Print ===
Newspaper

- Harvey County Now, regional newspaper in Newton.
- The Newton Kansan, regional newspaper in Newton.
- The Hutchinson News, regional newspaper in Hutchinson.
- The Wichita Eagle, major regional newspaper in Wichita.

=== Radio ===
Hesston is served by numerous radio stations of the Wichita-Hutchinson listening market area, and satellite radio. See Media in Wichita, Kansas.

=== Television ===
Hesston is served by over-the-air ATSC digital TV of the Wichita-Hutchinson viewing market area, cable TV by Cox Communications, and satellite TV. See Media in Wichita, Kansas.

== Infrastructure ==
=== Transportation ===
Interstate I-135 and highway US 81 pass through Hesston.

Hesston is served by a branch of the Kansas and Oklahoma Railroad operating between McPherson and Newton, where it connects to the BNSF Railway.

The Missouri Pacific Railroad formerly provided passenger rail service along a route from Eldorado to McPherson although this had ended prior to 1946. As of 2025, the nearest passenger rail station is located in Newton, where Amtrak's Southwest Chief stops once daily on a route from Chicago to Los Angeles.

=== Utilities ===
- Residential Internet
  - Ideatek Telcom LLC (fiber, wireless)
  - Lumen Technologies/Brightspeed/CenturyLink (DSL)
  - Cox Communications (Coaxial cable)
  - Skybeam/Rise Broadband (wireless)
  - T Mobile, AT&T, Verizon, U.S. Cellular (mobile)
- TV
  - Cable is provided by Cox Communications.
  - Satellite is provided by DirecTV, Dish Network.
  - Terrestrial is provided by regional digital TV stations.
- Telephone
  - Landline is provided by Lumen Technologies.
  - Cell Phone is available from T Mobile, AT&T, Verizon, U.S. Cellular.
- Electricity
  - City is provided by Evergy.
  - Rural is provided by Evergy.
- Natural Gas
  - Service is provided by City of Hesston.
- Water
  - City is provided by City of Hesston.
  - Rural is provided by Harvey County RWD #1 (map), Harvey County RWD #2, and Marion County RWD #4.
- Sewer
  - Service is provided by City of Hesston.
- Trash & Recycling
  - Service is provided by Nisly Brothers Inc., billed by City of Hesston.

== Notable people ==
- Katie Sowers, offensive assistant coach for the San Francisco 49ers
- Lyle Yost, cofounder of Hesston Industries in 1947 (acquired by AGCO in 1991).
