= Lyle Yost =

American inventor

- Born: March 5, 1913; Hesston, Kansas, US
- Died: April 5, 2012 (aged 99); Hesston, Kansas, US
- Education: Goshen College
- Known for: Agriculture equipment manufacturer, Inventor
- Children: 3 sons, 1 daughter

Lyle E. Yost (March 5, 1913 – April 5, 2012) was an agriculture equipment manufacturer and inventor in the United States.

Yost was the designer and inventor of the 1947 unloading auger, the catalyst for the development of Hesston Manufacturing in Hesston, Kansas. The device was used to unload grain from farm combines. The company's controlling stake was sold to Italian corporation Fiat Trattori in 1977. The remainder of the company was purchased in 1987 by the same firm. In 1991, a year after being established, AGCO Corporation purchased the rights to Hesston Manufacturing.

Yost's success in the agriculture industry led to multiple awards and accolades, including articles about his success in Fortune and Forbes.

== See also ==
- List of people from Harvey County, Kansas
