= Goessel USD 411 =

Public school district in Goessel, Kansas

Address
- 500 E. Main St. Goessel, Kansas, 67053; United States
- Coordinates: 38°14′50″N 97°20′27″W

District information
- Type: Public
- Grades: K to 12
- Superintendent: Scott Boden
- Schools: 2

Other information
- Website: usd411.org

Goessel USD 411 is a public unified school district headquartered in Goessel, Kansas, United States. The district includes the community of Goessel, and nearby rural areas of Marion / McPherson / Harvey Counties.

== History ==
The number of students in rural communities dropped significantly across the 20th century. As farming technology progressed from animal power to small tractors towards large tractors over time, it allowed a farmer to support significantly more farm land. In turn, this led to fewer farm families, which led to fewer rural students. In combination with a loss of young men during foreign wars and rural flight, all of these caused an incremental population shrinkage of rural communities over time.

In 1945 (after World War II), the School Reorganization Act in Kansas caused the consolidation of thousands of rural school districts in Kansas.

In 1963, the School Unification Act in Kansas caused the further consolidatation of thousands of tiny school districts into hundreds of larger Unified School Districts.

=== Current schools ===
The school district operates the following schools:

- Goessel High School at 100 East Main Street in Goessel.
- Goessel Junior High School at 100 East Main Street in Goessel.
- Goessel Elementary School at 500 East Main Street in Goessel.

=== Closed schools ===
- TBD

== See also ==
- Kansas State Department of Education
- Kansas State High School Activities Association
- List of high schools in Kansas
- List of unified school districts in Kansas
