= Sedgwick USD 439 =

Public school district in Sedgwick, Kansas

Address
- 400 W. 4th St. Sedgwick, Kansas, 67135; United States
- Coordinates: 37°54′58″N 97°25′52″W

District information
- Type: Public
- Grades: K to 12
- Schools: 2

Other information
- Website: usd439.com

Sedgwick USD 439 is a public unified school district headquartered in Sedgwick, Kansas, United States. The district includes the communities of Sedgwick, Putnam, and nearby rural areas.

== Schools ==
The school district operates the following schools:

- Sedgwick Junior/Senior High School
- R.L. Wright Elementary

== See also ==
- List of high schools in Kansas
- List of unified school districts in Kansas
- Kansas State Department of Education
- Kansas State High School Activities Association
