= Goessel, Kansas =

City in Marion County, Kansas

- City
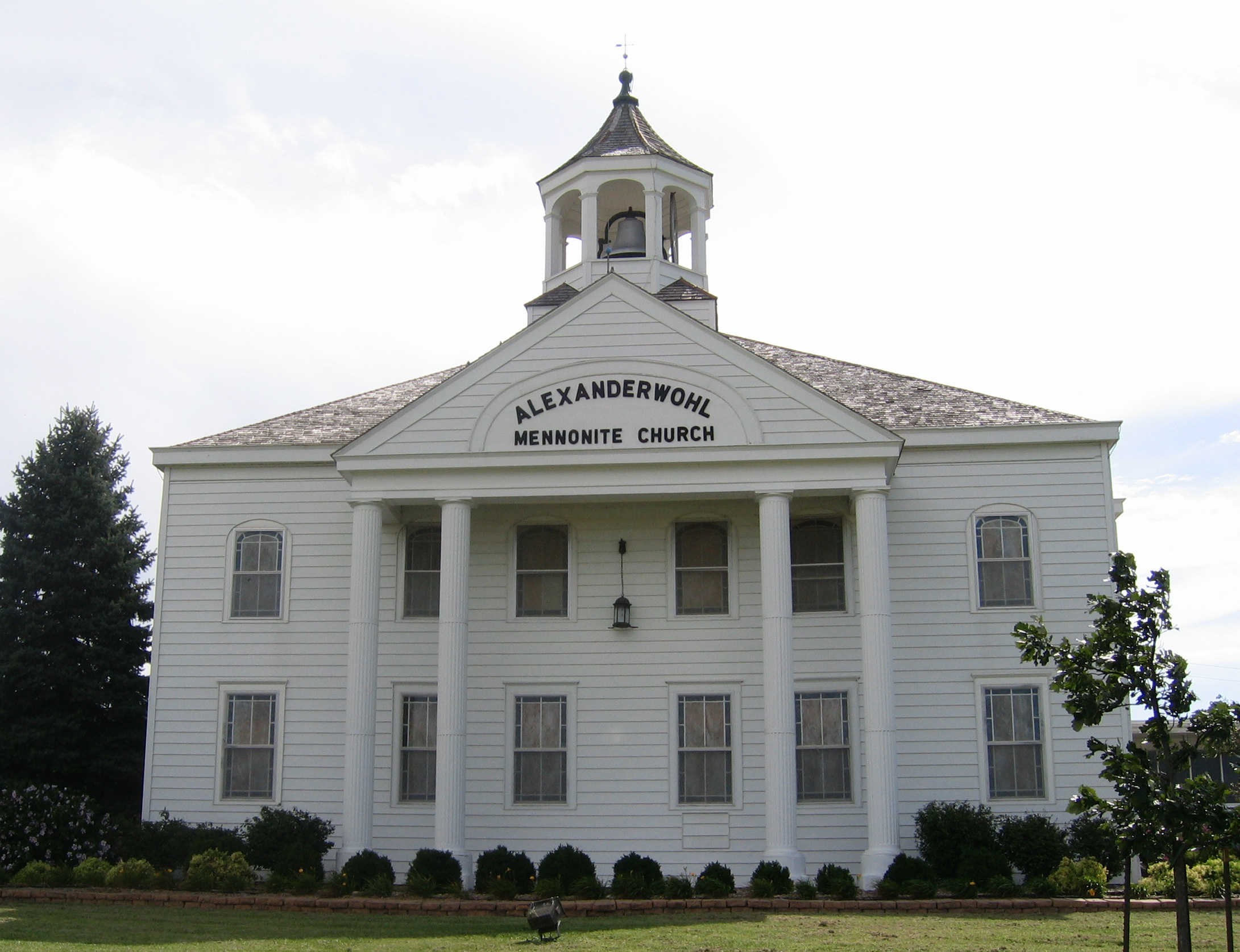
- Alexanderwohl Mennonite Church; 1 mile north of Goessel (2007)

- Location within Marion County and Kansas

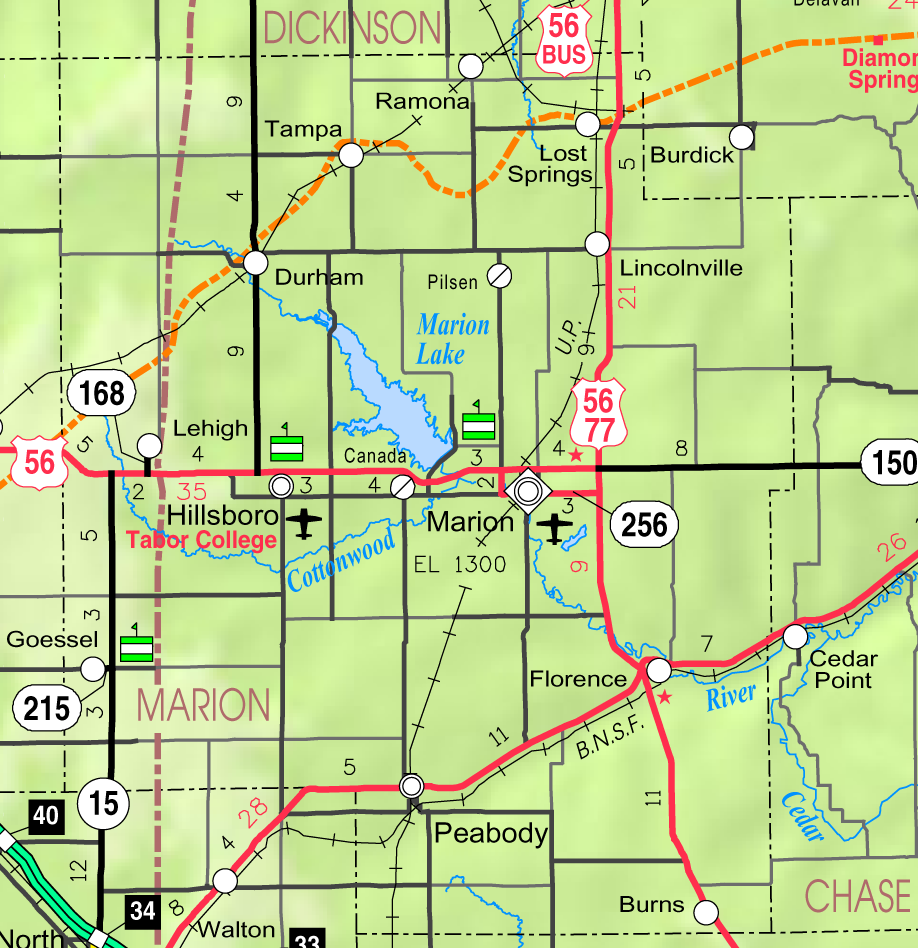
- KDOT map of Marion County (legend)
- Coordinates: 38°14′49″N 97°20′44.67″W
- Country: United States
- State: Kansas
- County: Marion
- Township: West Branch
- Platted: 1910
- Incorporated: 1952
- Named for: Kurt von Goessel

Government
  - Type: Mayor–Council
  - Mayor: Dave Schrag

Area
  - Total: 0.38 sq mi (0.98 km^{2})
  - Land: 0.38 sq mi (0.98 km^{2})
  - Water: 0 sq mi (0.00 km^{2})
- Elevation: 1,532 ft (467 m)

Population (2020)
  - Total: 556
  - Density: 1,500/sq mi (570/km^{2})
- Time zone: UTC-6 (CST)
  - Summer (DST): UTC-5 (CDT)
- ZIP Code: 67053
- Area code: 620
- FIPS code: 20-26750
- GNIS ID: 2394920
- Website: goesselks.com

Goessel is a city in Marion County, Kansas, United States. As of the 2020 census, the population of the city was 556. The city was named after Captain Kurt von Goessel (1852–1895) who went down with his ship, the Elbe, in the English Channel after it was rammed. It is located about 11 miles north of North Newton on the west side of K-15 highway.

== History ==
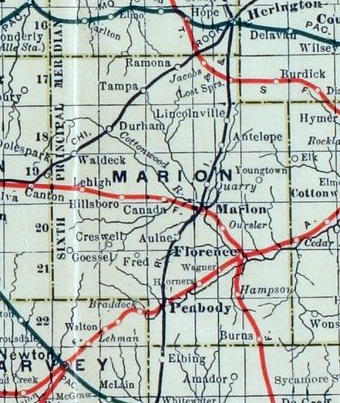
1915 railroad map of Marion County

=== Early history ===
For many millennia, the Great Plains of North America was inhabited by nomadic Native Americans. From the 16th century to the 18th century, the Kingdom of France claimed ownership of large parts of North America. In 1762, after the French and Indian War, France secretly ceded New France to Spain per the Treaty of Fontainebleau.

=== 19th century ===
In 1802, Spain returned most of the land to France. In 1803, most of the land for present-day Kansas was acquired by the United States from France as part of the 828,000-square-mile Louisiana Purchase for 2.83 cents per acre.

The Kansas Territory was organized in 1854, and Kansas became the 34th U.S. state in 1861. In 1855, Marion County was established within the Kansas Territory and included present-day Goessel.

The year 1874 saw the first wave of an immigration of Plautdietsch-speaking Russian Mennonites to south-central Kansas. The move was an attempt to preserve religious heritage and freedom after exclusion from military service was rescinded. In 1873 twelve Mennonite delegates from the Russian Empire toured Manitoba and Kansas, with the four conservative Mennonite delegates selecting the East Reserve in Manitoba and the eight liberal delegates selecting immigration to Kansas. In the next decade, one-third of Mennonites in Russia moved to North America. In 1874 a large number of Mennonites from the Molotschna Colony emigrated en masse to the United States aboard the ships Teutonia and Cimbria. This group split into two groups. The Alexanderwohl group sailed on the Cimbria and settled around present-day Goessel, and the Hoffnungsau group sailed on the Teutonia and settled around present-day Buhler and Inman.

The Alexanderwohl group split into eight communal villages. The village of Gnadenfeld (translation: Grace Field) was located where Goessel now stands. The village lasted for several years as a communal village, and then families moved onto their own larger parcels of land nearby. Several years passed before a trading center developed. The first public structure erected in Goessel was the Mennonite Brethren church in 1890, and one of the first businesses was a creamery station established that same year. In 1891 a small mercantile store was opened and Dr. Peter Richert moved into a building that was used as his doctor's office; later it became a post office. Dr. Richert read the story of Captain Kurt von Goessel, who went down with his steamship Elbe in the English Channel, and decided to submit the name Goessel to the U.S. Postal Department; the name was accepted on April 13, 1895.

=== 20th century ===
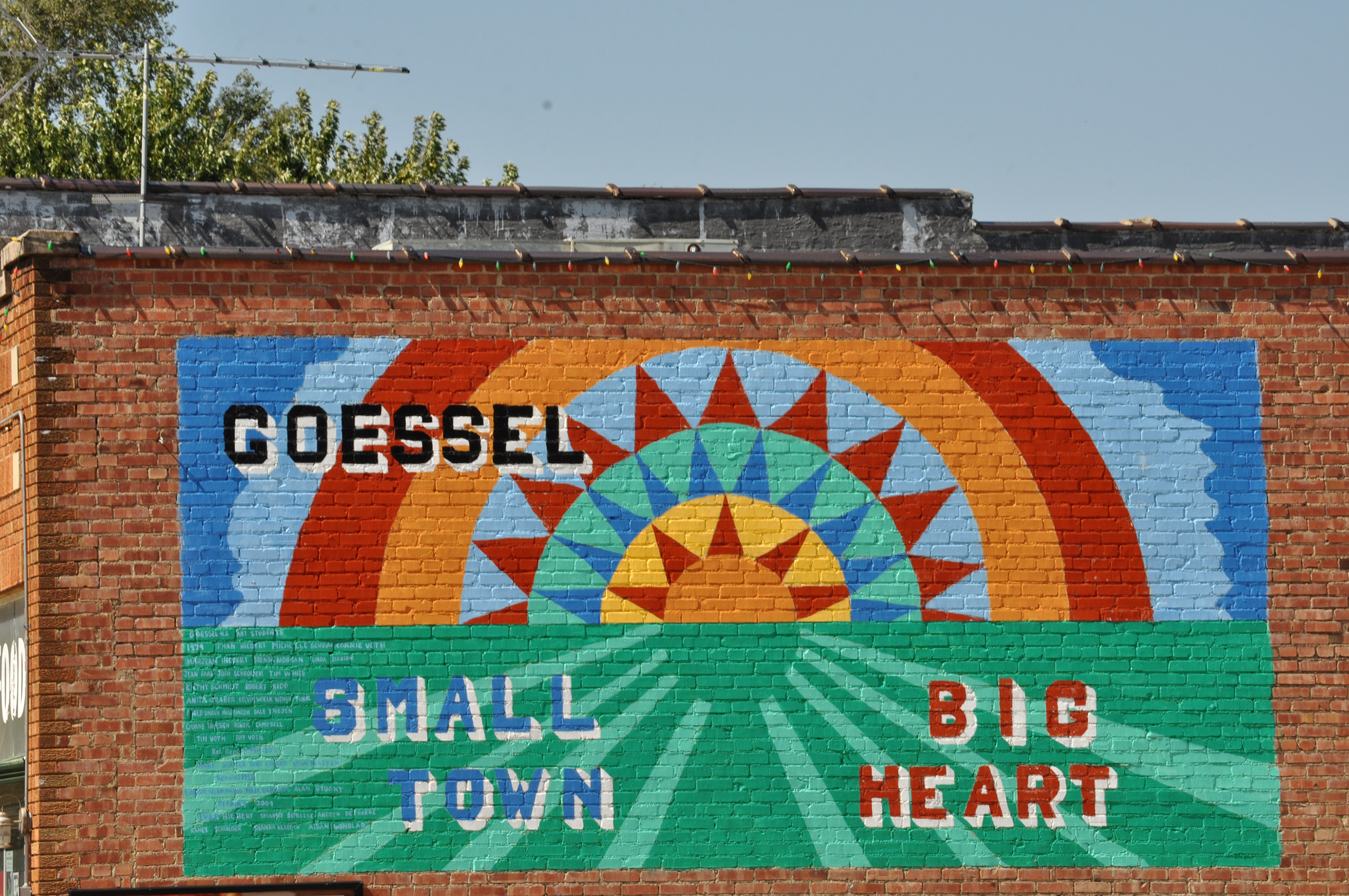
Goessel mural (2015)

In 1910, Goessel was platted and had a population of 100 people. In 1952, Goessel was incorporated and had a population of 260. In 2010, the United States Census reported 248 households and a population of 539.

On March 13, 1990, Goessel was damaged by an "extreme F5" tornado during a tornado outbreak. The severity of the damage left behind by this tornado led some meteorologists to believe that the Goessel tornado was among the strongest ever documented at that time.

Goessel is home to the Mennonite Heritage Museum, a complex of eight buildings that preserve artifacts from early Mennonite households, farms, schools, and churches and the Bethesda Mennonite Hospital.

== Geography ==
Goessel is located in the Great Plains of the state of Kansas. According to the United States Census Bureau, the city has a total area of 0.35 square miles (0.91 km^{2}), all land. The county line is one mile west of Goessel.

=== Climate ===
The climate in this area is characterized by hot, humid summers and generally mild to cool winters with very cold periods.

== Demographics ==
Historical population
Census	Pop.	Note	%±
1960	327		—
1970	386		18.0%
1980	421		9.1%
1990	506		20.2%
2000	565		11.7%
2010	539		−4.6%
2020	556		3.2%
U.S. Decennial Census

=== 2020 census ===
The 2020 United States census counted 556 people, 200 households, and 135 families in Goessel. The population density was 1,467.0 per square mile (566.4/km^{2}). There were 222 housing units at an average density of 585.8 per square mile (226.2/km^{2}). The racial makeup was 93.71% (521) white or European American (93.17% non-Hispanic white), 0.18% (1) black or African-American, 0.0% (0) Native American or Alaska Native, 0.0% (0) Asian, 0.18% (1) Pacific Islander or Native Hawaiian, 1.08% (6) from other races, and 4.86% (27) from two or more races. Hispanic or Latino of any race was 1.8% (10) of the population.

Of the 200 households, 32.5% had children under the age of 18; 58.5% were married couples living together; 23.5% had a female householder with no spouse or partner present. 31.5% of households consisted of individuals and 13.5% had someone living alone who was 65 years of age or older. The average household size was 2.4 and the average family size was 3.1. The percent of those with a bachelor's degree or higher was estimated to be 19.2% of the population.

27.2% of the population was under the age of 18, 3.2% from 18 to 24, 21.9% from 25 to 44, 21.2% from 45 to 64, and 26.4% who were 65 years of age or older. The median age was 42.6 years. For every 100 females, there were 108.2 males. For every 100 females ages 18 and older, there were 109.8 males.

The 2016–2020 5-year American Community Survey estimates show that the median household income was $53,750 (with a margin of error of +/- $17,685) and the median family income was $75,417 (+/- $16,757). Males had a median income of $51,204 (+/- $1,721) versus $21,985 (+/- $8,569) for females. The median income for those above 16 years old was $39,722 (+/- $11,894). Approximately, 3.0% of families and 4.5% of the population were below the poverty line, including 5.9% of those under the age of 18 and 1.7% of those ages 65 or over.

=== 2010 census ===
As of the census of 2010, there were 539 people, 206 households, and 140 families residing in the city. The population density was 1,540.0 inhabitants per square mile (594.6/km^{2}). There were 231 housing units at an average density of 660.0 per square mile (254.8/km^{2}). The racial makeup of the city was 97.0% White, 0.2% African American, 0.4% Native American, 0.9% from other races, and 1.5% from two or more races. Hispanic or Latino of any race were 2.0% of the population.

There were 206 households, of which 28.2% had children under the age of 18 living with them, 57.8% were married couples living together, 7.3% had a female householder with no husband present, 2.9% had a male householder with no wife present, and 32.0% were non-families. 30.1% of all households were made up of individuals, and 18% had someone living alone who was 65 years of age or older. The average household size was 2.36 and the average family size was 2.91.

The median age in the city was 48.6 years. 22.6% of residents were under the age of 18; 5.1% were between the ages of 18 and 24; 18.9% were from 25 to 44; 23.4% were from 45 to 64; and 30.1% were 65 years of age or older. The gender makeup of the city was 45.8% male and 54.2% female.

== Area events ==
- Goessel Threshing Days, located at Mennonite Heritage and Agricultural Museum. Old-fashioned threshing demonstration / displaying / demonstrating antique equipment related to farming during the past century. Numerous antique tractors are displayed. Ethnic Mennonite food is available.
- Goessel Harvest Festival.

== Area attractions ==
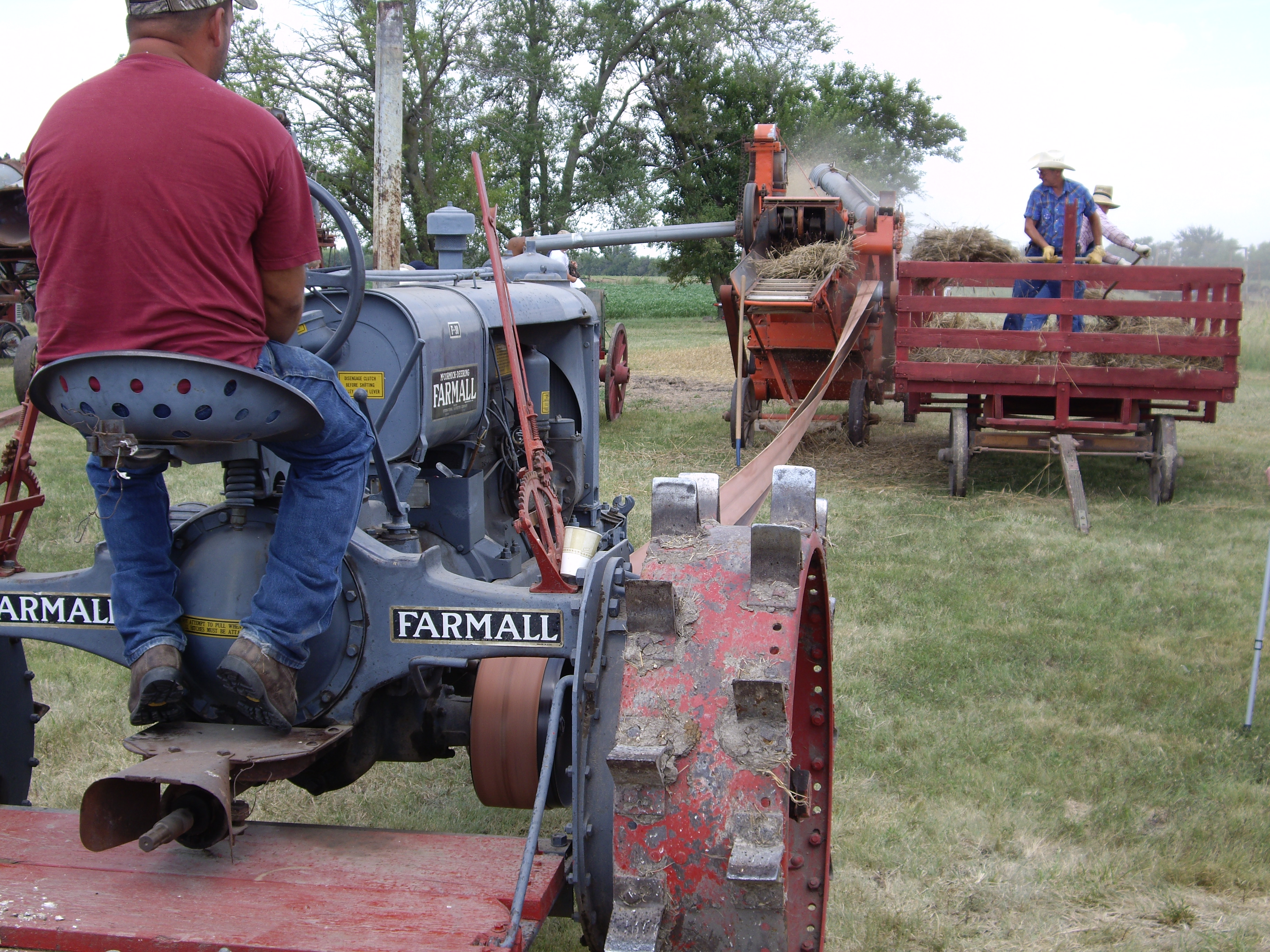
Wheat threshing demo at Goessel Threshing Days (2010)

- Mennonite Heritage and Agricultural Museum, 200 N Poplar St. The Mennonite Heritage Museum was dedicated in 1974. It is a museum of artifacts of the Mennonites that settled in the Goessel area. The museum has eight buildings that depict the life of the immigrants who moved to Goessel.
- Alexanderwohl Mennonite Church, 1 mi north on K-15 Highway.
- Kansas Historical Marker - The Mennonites In Kansas, 1 mi north on K-15 Highway.

== Government ==
The Goessel government consists of a mayor and five council members. The council meets the 3rd Monday of each month at 8PM.

- City Hall, 101 S Cedar St.

== Education ==
=== Public ===
The community is served by Goessel USD 411 public school district.

- Goessel High School, 100 E Main St.
- Goessel Junior High School, 100 E Main St.
- Goessel Elementary School, 500 E Main St.

==== Sports ====
The Goessel High School mascot is a Bluebird.

It offers football, volleyball, cross country, basketball, golf and track and field. Goessel Jr/Sr. High School is a member of the Wheat State League and the Kansas State High School Activities Association (KSHSAA).

Past Championships:

- 1976 Boys Cross Country - Class 1A
- 1988 Boys Basketball - Class 1A
- 2015 Scholars' Bowl - Class 1A
- 2015 Volleyball - Class 1A
- 2016 Girls Cross Country - Class 1A

=== Library ===
Each USD 411 school has a library for student access.

The city is served by the Goessel Public Library at 101 South Cedar Street. The library is a member of the https://lib.nckls.org/ North Central Kansas Libraries System], which provides an inter-library book loan service for its members. The library's mission is to meet the needs of the town with programming, materials, computers and free 24 hour internet access.

== Media ==
=== Print ===
- Hillsboro Free Press, free newspaper for greater Marion County area.
- The Newton Kansan, regional newspaper from Newton.

=== Radio ===
Goessel is served by numerous radio stations of the Wichita-Hutchinson listening market area, and satellite radio. See Media in Wichita, Kansas.

=== Television ===
Goessel is served by over-the-air ATSC digital TV of the Wichita-Hutchinson viewing market area, cable TV, and satellite TV. See Media in Wichita, Kansas.

== Infrastructure ==
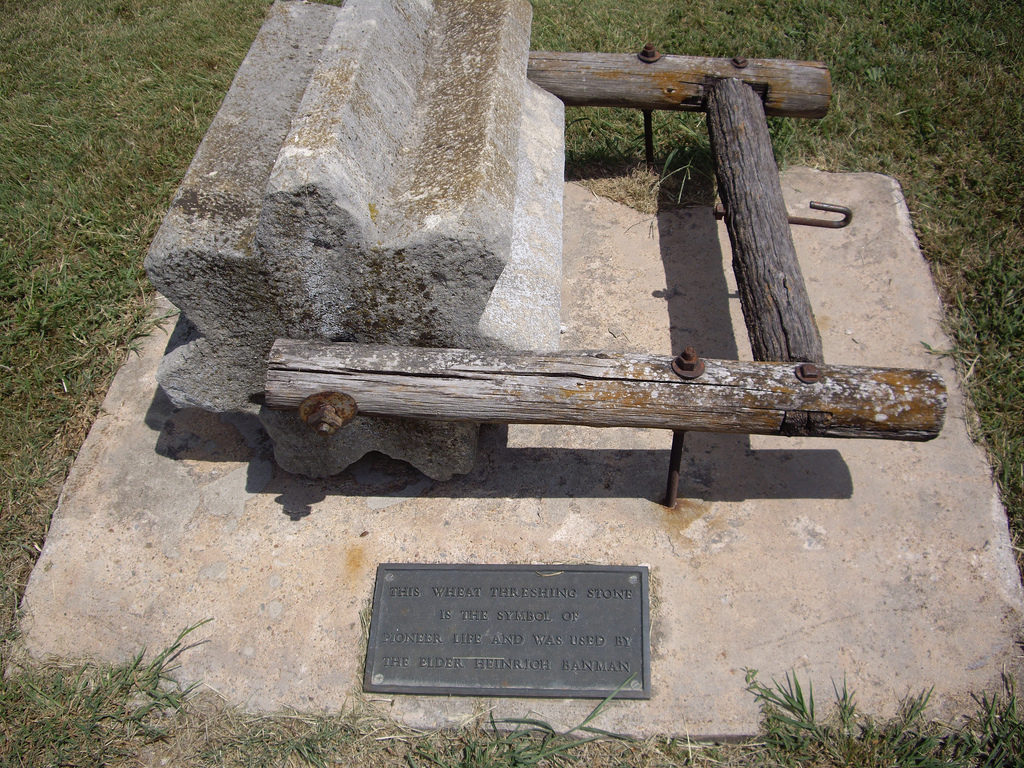
Threshing stone near Alexanderwohl Mennonite Church (2011)

=== Transportation ===
K-15 highway runs along the east side of the city.

=== Utilities ===
- Internet
  - DSL is provided by Moundridge Telephone Company.
  - Wireless is provided by Pixius Communications.
  - Satellite is provided by HughesNet, StarBand, WildBlue.
- TV
  - Cable is provided by Moundridge Telephone Company.
  - Satellite is provided by DirecTV, Dish Network.
  - Terrestrial is provided by regional digital TV stations.
- Phone
  - Landline is provided by Moundridge Telephone Company.
- Electricity
  - City is provided by Westar Energy.
  - Rural is provided by Westar Energy and Flint Hills RECA.
- Natural Gas
  - Service is provided by Kansas Gas Service.
- Water
  - City is provided by Marion County RWD #4, billed by City of Goessel.
  - Rural is provided by Marion County RWD #4 (map) and Harvey County RWD #1 (map).
- Sewer
  - Service is provided by City of Goessel.
- Trash
  - Service is provided by City of Goessel.

== Notable people ==
- Ira Anders (1942–2025), politician who served four terms in the Missouri House of Representatives
- Wes Buller (1928–2018), football coach
- Shirley Knight (1936–2020), American stage, screen and television actress. Academy Award-nominated actress
- Duane D. Thiessen (b. 1951), Major General, United States Marine Corps

== See also ==
- National Register of Historic Places listings in Marion County, Kansas
- Historical Maps of Marion County, Kansas
- Chisholm Trail
- Threshing Stone
