= Burrton, Kansas =

City in Harvey County, Kansas

- City
- Location within Harvey County and Kansas

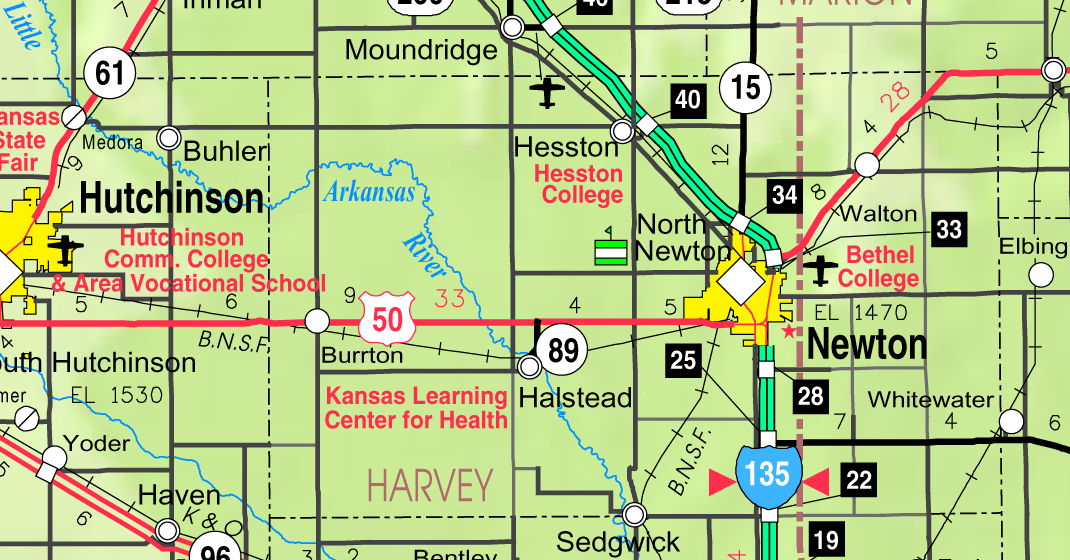
- KDOT map of Harvey County (legend)
- Coordinates: 38°01′25″N 97°40′17″W
- Country: United States
- State: Kansas
- County: Harvey
- Township: Burrton
- Platted: 1873
- Incorporated: 1878
- Named for: Isaac T. Burr

Government
  - Type: Mayor–Council

Area
  - Total: 0.89 sq mi (2.30 km^{2})
  - Land: 0.89 sq mi (2.30 km^{2})
  - Water: 0 sq mi (0.00 km^{2})
- Elevation: 1,453 ft (443 m)

Population (2020)
  - Total: 861
  - Density: 970/sq mi (374/km^{2})
- Time zone: UTC-6 (CST)
  - Summer (DST): UTC-5 (CDT)
- ZIP Code: 67020
- Area code: 620
- FIPS code: 20-09575
- GNIS ID: 2393474
- Website: burrtonkansas.com

Burrton is a city in Harvey County, Kansas, United States. It is named after Isaac T. Burr, former vice-president of the Atchison, Topeka and Santa Fe Railway. As of the 2020 census, the population of the city was 861.

== History ==
=== 19th century ===
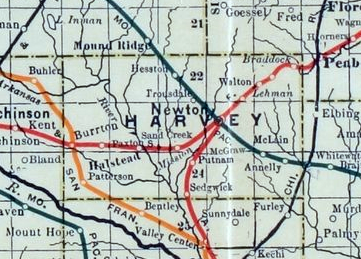
1915 railroad map of Harvey County

For millennia, the land now known as Kansas was inhabited by Native Americans. In 1803, most of modern Kansas was secured by the United States as part of the Louisiana Purchase. In 1854, the Kansas Territory was organized, then in 1861 Kansas became the 34th U.S. state. In 1872, Harvey County was founded.

Burrton was laid out in 1873. It was named from Burrton Township, which was named for I.T. Burr, a railroad official. The first post office in Burrton was established in June 1873. Burrton was incorporated as a city in 1878.

Burrton's location at the junction of two railroads made it an important regional shipping point.

== Geography ==
According to the United States Census Bureau, the city has a total area of 0.90 square miles (2.33 km^{2}), all land.

== Demographics ==
Historical population
Census	Pop.	Note	%±
1880	386		—
1890	695		80.1%
1900	627		−9.8%
1910	689		9.9%
1920	679		−1.5%
1930	649		−4.4%
1940	842		29.7%
1950	749		−11.0%
1960	774		3.3%
1970	808		4.4%
1980	976		20.8%
1990	866		−11.3%
2000	932		7.6%
2010	901		−3.3%
2020	861		−4.4%
U.S. Decennial Census

=== 2020 census ===
The 2020 United States census counted 861 people, 326 households, and 225 families in Burrton. The population density was 970.7 per square mile (374.8/km^{2}). There were 383 housing units at an average density of 431.8 per square mile (166.7/km^{2}). The racial makeup was 86.88% (748) white or European American (85.02% non-Hispanic white), 1.28% (11) black or African-American, 0.46% (4) Native American or Alaska Native, 0.46% (4) Asian, 0.0% (0) Pacific Islander or Native Hawaiian, 1.74% (15) from other races, and 9.18% (79) from two or more races. Hispanic or Latino of any race was 6.39% (55) of the population.

Of the 326 households, 35.6% had children under the age of 18; 48.5% were married couples living together; 24.2% had a female householder with no spouse or partner present. 24.8% of households consisted of individuals and 8.6% had someone living alone who was 65 years of age or older. The average household size was 2.8 and the average family size was 3.4. The percent of those with a bachelor's degree or higher was estimated to be 11.8% of the population.

28.2% of the population was under the age of 18, 8.0% from 18 to 24, 25.3% from 25 to 44, 24.9% from 45 to 64, and 13.6% who were 65 years of age or older. The median age was 37.0 years. For every 100 females, there were 109.0 males. For every 100 females ages 18 and older, there were 99.4 males.

The 2016–2020 5-year American Community Survey estimates show that the median household income was $57,813 (with a margin of error of +/- $11,941) and the median family income was $66,833 (+/- $5,956). Males had a median income of $36,406 (+/- $7,525) versus $20,119 (+/- $3,553) for females. The median income for those above 16 years old was $27,196 (+/- $4,990). Approximately, 14.8% of families and 20.0% of the population were below the poverty line, including 24.7% of those under the age of 18 and 14.8% of those ages 65 or over.

=== 2010 census ===
As of the census of 2010, there were 901 people, 347 households, and 237 families residing in the city. The population density was 1,001.1 inhabitants per square mile (386.5/km^{2}). There were 396 housing units at an average density of 440.0 per square mile (169.9/km^{2}). The racial makeup of the city was 93.9% White, 0.4% African American, 1.1% Native American, 0.1% Asian, 2.7% from other races, and 1.8% from two or more races. Hispanic or Latino of any race were 6.2% of the population.

There were 347 households, of which 36.0% had children under the age of 18 living with them, 54.5% were married couples living together, 9.8% had a female householder with no husband present, 4.0% had a male householder with no wife present, and 31.7% were non-families. 26.2% of all households were made up of individuals, and 9.2% had someone living alone who was 65 years of age or older. The average household size was 2.60 and the average family size was 3.14.

The median age in the city was 36.2 years. 30.2% of residents were under the age of 18; 6.7% were between the ages of 18 and 24; 23.6% were from 25 to 44; 26.1% were from 45 to 64; and 13.4% were 65 years of age or older. The gender makeup of the city was 47.3% male and 52.7% female.

=== 2000 census ===
As of the census of 2000, there were 932 people, 361 households, and 251 families residing in the city. The population density was 1,520.9 inhabitants per square mile (587.2/km^{2}). There were 402 housing units at an average density of 656.0 per square mile (253.3/km^{2}). The racial makeup of the city was 93.78% White, 0.97% African American, 0.43% Native American, 2.25% from other races, and 2.58% from two or more races. Hispanic or Latino of any race were 5.15% of the population.

There were 361 households, out of which 33.0% had children under the age of 18 living with them, 57.1% were married couples living together, 8.9% had a female householder with no husband present, and 30.2% were non-families. 26.0% of all households were made up of individuals, and 10.0% had someone living alone who was 65 years of age or older. The average household size was 2.58 and the average family size was 3.08.

In the city, the population was spread out, with 28.2% under the age of 18, 10.4% from 18 to 24, 28.8% from 25 to 44, 19.5% from 45 to 64, and 13.1% who were 65 years of age or older. The median age was 34 years. For every 100 females, there were 96.2 males. For every 100 females age 18 and over, there were 93.9 males.

As of 2000 the median income for a household in the city was $33,646, and the median income for a family was $37,174. Males had a median income of $29,643 versus $21,477 for females. The per capita income for the city was $14,835. About 9.9% of families and 11.6% of the population were below the poverty line, including 18.4% of those under age 18 and 7.9% of those age 65 or over.

== Education ==
The community is served by Burrton USD 369 public school district.

The Burrton Chargers won the following Kansas State High School championships:

- 1977 Boys Cross Country - Class 1A
- 1978 Boys Cross Country - Class 1A
- 1979 Boys Cross Country - Class 1A
- 1979 Boys Track & Field - Class 1A
- 1986 Girls Cross Country - Class 1A
- 1986 Girls Track & Field - Class 1A
- 1987 Girls Track & Field - Class 1A
- 1988 Girls Cross Country - Class 1A
- 1988 Girls Track & Field - Class 1A
- 1989 Girls Track & Field - Class 1A
- 1990 Girls Track & Field - Class 1A
- 1992 Girls Basketball - Class 1A
- 1997 Boys Track & Field - Class 1A
- 2003 Boys Basketball - Class 1A

== Notable people ==
- Milburn Stone, portrayed fictional Galen "Doc" Adams, M.D., of Dodge City on the long-running CBS western television series, Gunsmoke.

== See also ==
- La Junta Subdivision, branch of the BNSF Railway
- Arkansas Valley Interurban Railway
