= Annelly, Kansas =

Ghost town in Harvey County, Kansas

- Ghost town
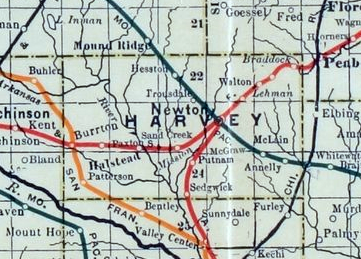
- 1915 railroad map of Harvey County

- Location within Kansas Location within the United States
- Coordinates: 37°58′20″N 97°12′04″W
- Country: United States
- State: Kansas
- County: Harvey
- Township: Richland
- Elevation: 1,388 ft (423 m)

Population
  - Total: 0
- Time zone: UTC-6 (CST)
  - Summer (DST): UTC-5 (CDT)
- Area code: 620
- FIPS code: 20-01890
- GNIS ID: 484651

Annelly is a ghost town in Richland Township, nine miles southeast of Newton in Harvey County, Kansas, United States. The community was located along the Missouri Pacific Railroad line between Newton and Whitewater, but the track was abandoned in 2003. As of 2020, the land was privately owned farmland.

== History ==
=== Early history ===
For many millennia, the Great Plains of North America was inhabited by nomadic Native Americans. From the 16th century to 18th century, the Kingdom of France claimed ownership of large parts of North America. In 1762, after the French and Indian War, France secretly ceded New France to Spain, per the Treaty of Fontainebleau.

=== 19th century ===
In 1802, Spain returned most of the land to France. In 1803, most of the land for modern day Kansas was acquired by the United States from France as part of the 828,000 square mile Louisiana Purchase for 2.83 cents per acre.

In 1854, the Kansas Territory was organized, then in 1861 Kansas became the 34th U.S. state. In 1872, Harvey County was established within the Kansas Territory, which included the land for modern day Annelly.

The community was established after the Missouri Pacific was built through the area. Annelly was named by a railroad employee for his wife Ann and daughter Ellie. A post office existed in Annelly from August 25, 1885, to December 31, 1921.

=== 20th century ===
In 1910, Annelly, (population 25) had a money order post office, a station on the Missouri Pacific Railroad, a grain elevator, a hotel, and a general store.

=== 21st century ===
In 2003, the railroad track was abandoned.

Today only the Main Street (Annelly Road or SE 57th Street, accessible from S East Lake Rd. and SE 60th Street) of Annelly still exists. Until the early 2010s an old one-room school house stood near the townsite, although the schoolhouse could not be observed or approached from public roads. The school house was moved to property owned by Lewis Earl Entz. It has been restored but is on private property. For many years, even after the school closed this was the community center, for 4H and the Women's Farm Bureau which became the EHU Extension Homemakers Units. It was also where residents of the township voted for many years.

A farm house on the west end of Main Street is still occupied. The old railroad bed still passes through the townsite, and some evidence of buildings and old streets can still be seen. Gypsum Creek, a tributary of the Whitewater River, runs through Annelly.

== Education ==
The modern day rural area around Annelly is served by the Remington USD 206 public school district.

== Transportation ==
The Missouri Pacific Railroad formerly provided passenger rail service along a route from Eldorado to McPherson although this had ended prior to 1946. As of 2025, the nearest passenger rail station is located in Newton, where Amtrak's Southwest Chief stops once daily on a route from Chicago to Los Angeles.
