= Sedgwick Township, Kansas =

Township in Kansas, United States

Sedgwick Township Harvey County, Kansas
- Township
- Location within Harvey County

- Location within state of Kansas
- Coordinates: 37°57′20″N 97°25′41″W
- Country: United States
- State: Kansas
- County: Harvey

Area
  - Total: 35.74 sq mi (92.57 km^{2})
  - Land: 35.74 sq mi (92.57 km^{2})
  - Water: 0 sq mi (0 km^{2}) 0%
- Elevation: 1,394 ft (425 m)

Population (2020)
  - Total: 1,748
  - Density: 48.91/sq mi (18.88/km^{2})
- Time zone: UTC-6 (CST)
  - Summer (DST): UTC-5 (CDT)
- FIPS code: 20-63825
- GNIS ID: 473687
- Website: County website

Sedgwick Township is a township in Harvey County, Kansas, United States. As of the 2020 census, its population was 1,748.

== Geography ==
Sedgwick Township covers an area of 35.74 square miles (92.6 km^{2}) and contains one incorporated settlement, Sedgwick. According to the USGS, it contains one cemetery, Hillside. The streams of East Emma Creek, Emma Creek, Kisiwa Creek, Mud Creek, Sand Creek and West Emma Creek run through this township.
