= Highland Township, Harvey County, Kansas =

Township in Kansas, United States

Highland Township Harvey County, Kansas
- Township
- Location within Harvey County

- Location within state of Kansas
- Coordinates: 38°8′20″N 97°19′1″W
- Country: United States
- State: Kansas
- County: Harvey

Area
  - Total: 35.47 sq mi (91.87 km^{2})
  - Land: 35.4 sq mi (91.7 km^{2})
  - Water: 0.066 sq mi (0.17 km^{2}) 0.19%
- Elevation: 1,460 ft (450 m)

Population (2020)
  - Total: 384
  - Density: 10.8/sq mi (4.19/km^{2})
- Time zone: UTC-6 (CST)
  - Summer (DST): UTC-5 (CDT)
- FIPS code: 20-31875
- GNIS ID: 477770
- Website: County website

Highland Township is a township in Harvey County, Kansas, United States. As of the 2020 census, its population was 384.

== Geography ==
Highland Township covers an area of 35.47 square miles (91.9 km^{2}) and contains no incorporated settlements. The stream of Beaver Creek runs through this township.
