= Garden Township, Harvey County, Kansas =

Township in Kansas, United States

Garden Township Harvey County, Kansas
- Township
- Location within Harvey County

- Location within state of Kansas
- Coordinates: 38°7′45″N 97°32′16″W
- Country: United States
- State: Kansas
- County: Harvey

Area
  - Total: 36.09 sq mi (93.46 km^{2})
  - Land: 36.09 sq mi (93.46 km^{2})
  - Water: 0 sq mi (0 km^{2}) 0%
- Elevation: 1,434 ft (437 m)

Population (2020)
  - Total: 300
  - Density: 8.3/sq mi (3.2/km^{2})
- Time zone: UTC-6 (CST)
  - Summer (DST): UTC-5 (CDT)
- FIPS code: 20-25300
- GNIS ID: 477753
- Website: County website

Garden Township is a township in Harvey County, Kansas, United States. As of the 2020 census, its population was 300.

== Geography ==
Garden Township covers an area of 36.09 square miles (93.5 km^{2}) and contains no incorporated settlements. According to the USGS, it contains one cemetery, Schlender.
