= Burrton USD 369 =

Public school district in Burrton, Kansas

Address
- 105 E. Lincoln St. Burrton, Kansas, 67020; United States
- Coordinates: 38°1′10″N 97°40′17″W

District information
- Type: Public
- Grades: K to 12
- Schools: 2

Other information
- Website: burrton.usd369.org

Burrton USD 369 is a public unified school district headquartered in Burrton, Kansas, United States. The district includes the communities of Burrton, Patterson, and nearby rural areas.

== Schools ==
The school district operates the following schools:

- Burrton Middle/High School
- Burrton Elementary School

== See also ==
- Kansas State Department of Education
- Kansas State High School Activities Association
- List of high schools in Kansas
- List of unified school districts in Kansas
