= McLain, Kansas =

Unincorporated community in Harvey County, Kansas

- Unincorporated Community
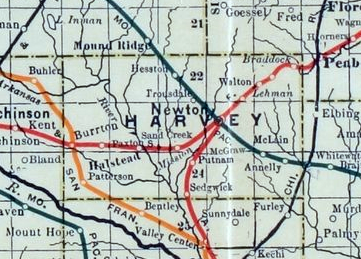
- 1915 railroad map of Harvey County

- Location within Kansas Location within the United States
- Coordinates: 37°59′58″N 97°15′47″W
- Country: United States
- State: Kansas
- County: Harvey
- Elevation: 1,509 ft (460 m)
- Time zone: UTC-6 (CST)
  - Summer (DST): UTC-5 (CDT)
- ZIP Code: 67114
- Area code: 316
- FIPS code: 20-43897
- GNIS ID: 484650

McLain is an unincorporated community in Harvey County, Kansas, United States. Various maps and documents have listed the name as McLain, McLains, McLain's, and McClain. It is located a few miles southeast of Newton at the intersection of SE 36th St and S Woodlawn Rd.

== History ==
McLain had a post office from 1886 until 1906.

The community was located along the Missouri Pacific Railroad line between Newton and Whitewater, but the track was abandoned in 2003.

== Education ==
The community is served by Newton USD 373 public school district.

== Transportation ==
The Missouri Pacific Railroad formerly provided passenger rail service along a route from Eldorado to McPherson although this had ended prior to 1946. As of 2025, the nearest passenger rail station is located in Newton, where Amtrak's Southwest Chief stops once daily on a route from Chicago to Los Angeles.
