= West Branch Township, Kansas =

West Branch Township Marion County, Kansas
- Township
- Location within Marion County

- Location within the state of Kansas
- Coordinates: 38.2176584°N 97.3171879°W
- Country: United States
- State: Kansas
- County: Marion

Area
  - Total: 36 sq mi (93 km^{2})

Dimensions
  - Length: 6.0 mi (9.7 km)
  - Width: 6.0 mi (9.7 km)
- Elevation: 1,539 ft (469 m)

Population (2020)
  - Total: 1,001
  - Density: 28/sq mi (11/km^{2})
- Time zone: UTC-6 (CST)
  - Summer (DST): UTC-5 (CDT)
- Area code: 620
- FIPS code: 20-76775
- GNIS ID: 477348
- Website: County website

West Branch Township is a township in Marion County, Kansas, United States. As of the 2020 census, the township population was 1,001, including the city of Goessel.

== Geography ==
West Branch Township covers an area of 36 square miles (93.2 km^{2}).

== Cities and towns ==
The township contains the following settlements:

- City of Goessel.

== Cemeteries ==
The township contains the following cemeteries:

- Emmethal Community Cemetery, located in Section 29 T29S R1E.
- General Conference of Mennonite Church of North America Cemetery, located in Section 27 T21S R1E.
- Goessel Cemetery (1 block south of Main St on Cedar St), located in Section 5 T21S R1E.
- Goessel Mennonite Brethren Cemetery, located in Section 8 T21S R1E.
- Greenfield Cemetery (a.k.a. Greunfeld Cemetery), located in Section 16 T21S R1E.
- Schoenthal Cemetery, located in Section 35 T21S R1E.
- Tabor Mennonite Cemetery, located in Section 21 T21S R1E.
- Green Valley Cemetery (a.k.a. Quiring Cemetery) (a.k.a. West Branch Gravesite), located in Section 11 T21S R1E.
- Heibert Farm Cemetery, located in Section 27 T21S R1E.
- Voth Cemetery, located in Section 1 T21S R1E.
- Unknown Cemetery (no longer in use), located in Section 36 T21S R1E.

== Transportation ==
K-15 highway passes north to south through the township.
