= Hesston College =

Private college in Hesston, Kansas, U.S.

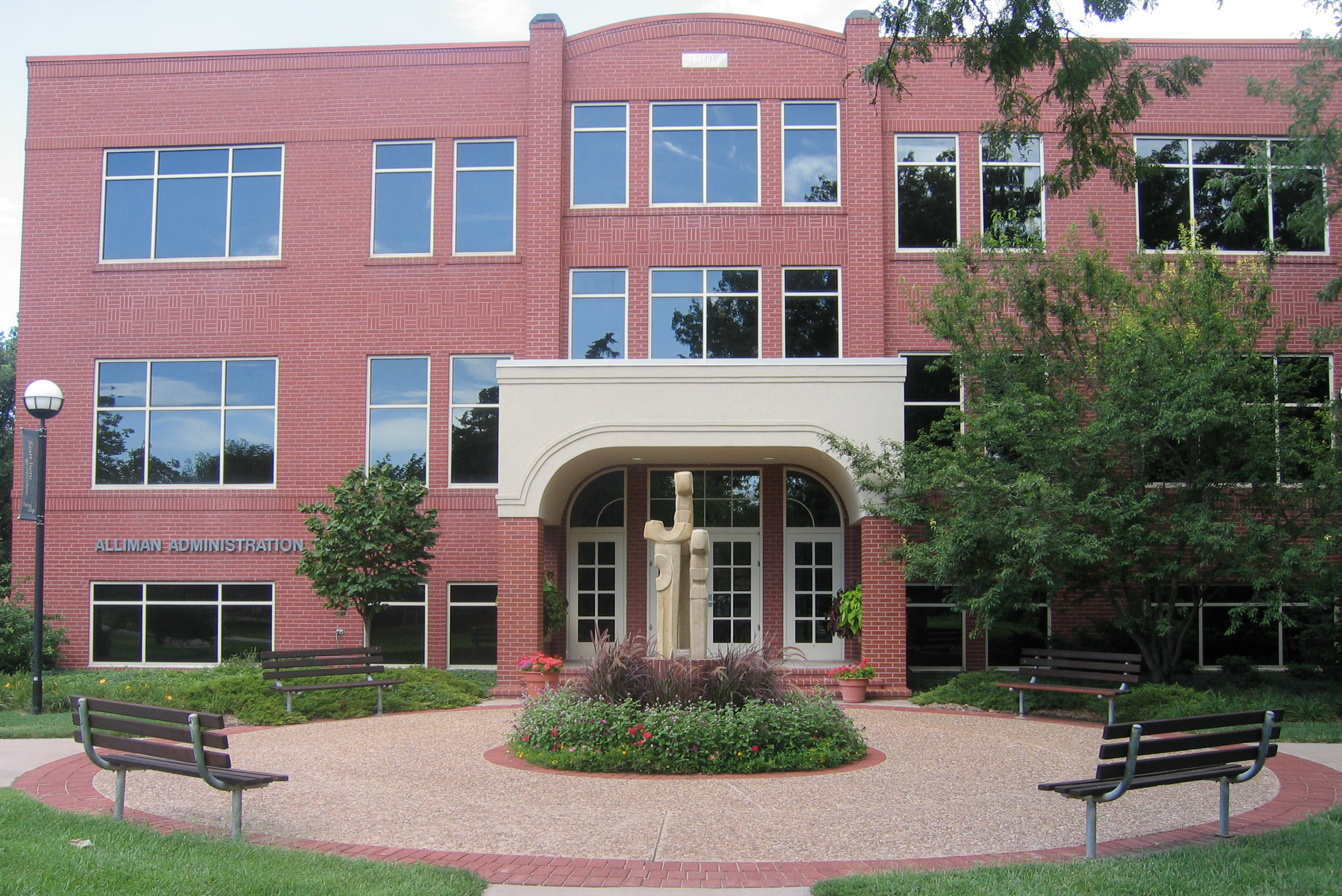
- Alliman Administration Center (2007)
- Type: Private college
- Established: 1909
- Religious affiliation: Mennonite Church USA
- Endowment: $11.9 million (2016)
- President: Ross Peterson-Veatch
- Academic staff: 51
- Students: 442
- Location: Hesston, Kansas, United States; 38°08′05″N 97°26′00″W
- Campus: Rural, 40 acres (16 ha)
- Colors: Red and Gold
- Nickname: Larks
- Sporting affiliations: NAIA – Continental
- Website: hesston.edu
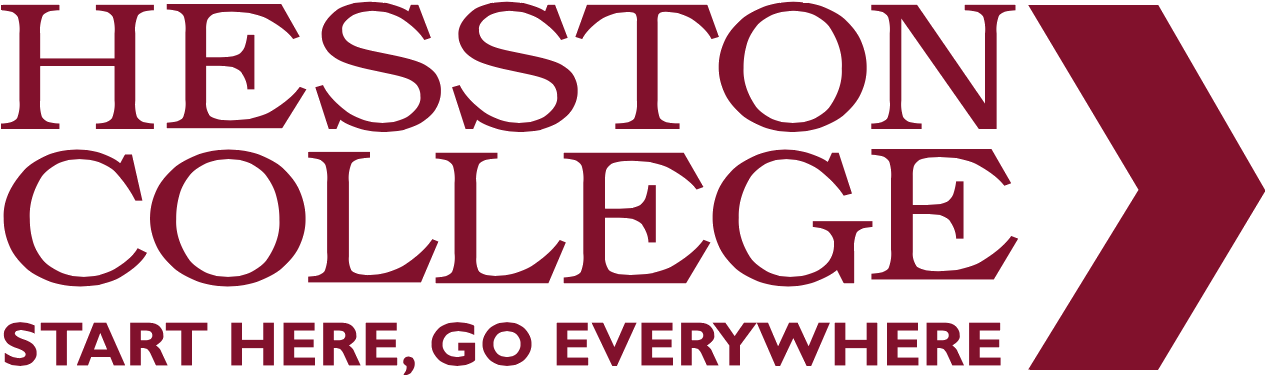

Hesston College is a private college in Hesston, Kansas, United States. It is associated with the Mennonite Church USA and has an enrollment of about 400 students who typically come from about 30 states and 15 other countries.

== History ==
Opening in 1909 as Hesston Academy and Bible School, Heston College has offered collegiate level classes since 1915. Founded by T.M. Erb and A.L. Hess after approval by the Kansas-Nebraska Mennonite Conference and endorsement by the Mennonite Board of Education (MBE). Hesston College was affiliated with Mennonite Church and operated by MBE until 2002 when Mennonite Church merged with other denominations and Mennonite Church USA was formed. High school level classes were offered until 1963.

In 1981, the Dyck Arboretum of the Plains was founded at the college.

== Educational facilities ==
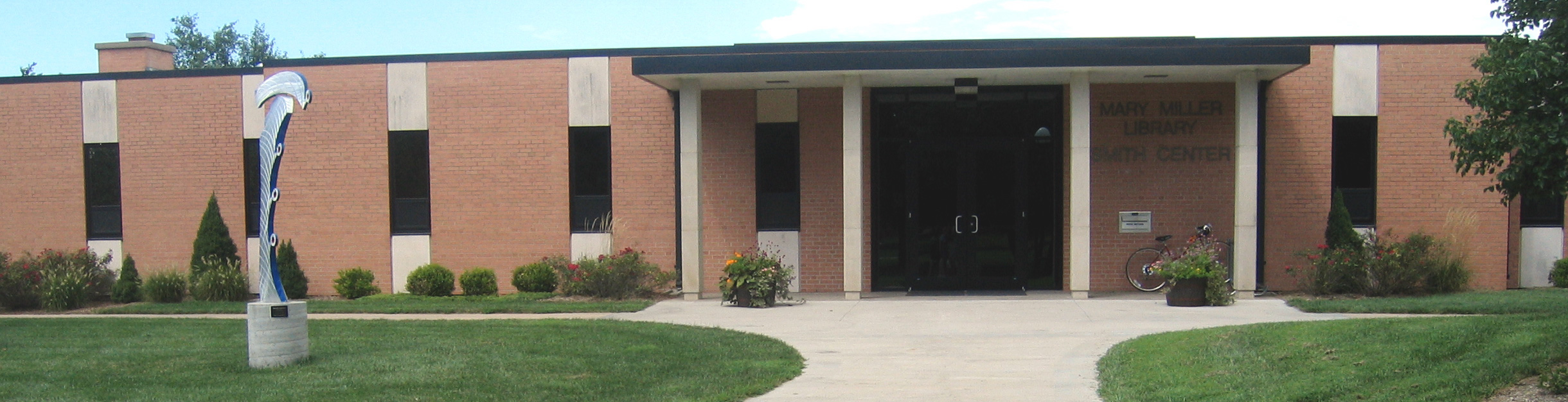
Mary Miller Library (2007)

The main 50 acres (20 ha) Hesston campus consists of 12 buildings, including two residential dormitories (Erb hall and Kaufman Court), an administration building, library, a number of academic buildings, and two gymnasiums. It also has a baseball diamond, a softball field, soccer field, a weight room, and four tennis courts.

The Dyck Arboretum of the Plains is a 25 acres (10 ha) arboretum located 1 block south of the main campus.

The aviation program has facilities at the Newton City-County Airport east of Newton, Kansas.

The Nursing program, in addition to facilities on the main campus, has affiliations with local hospitals, including Newton Medical Center and Prairie View Mental Health Center in Newton, Schowalter Villa in Hesston, and Via Christi-St. Francis Campus, Via Christi-St. Joseph Campus, and Wesley Medical Center in Wichita.

== Athletics ==
The Hesston athletic teams are called the Larks. The college is a member of the National Association of Intercollegiate Athletics (NAIA) and the National Christian College Athletic Association (NCCAA), primary competing in the NAIA's Continental Athletic Conference (CAC) since the 2025–26 academic year. The Larks previously were in the National Junior College Athletic Association (NJCAA) and the Kansas Jayhawk Community College Conference (KJCCC) starting in 2018–19.

Hesston competes in 12 intercollegiate varsity teams. Men's sports include baseball, basketball, cross country, golf, soccer and track & field; while women's sports include basketball, cross country, flag football, soccer, softball and track & field.

=== Joining the NAIA ===
On April 7, 2025, Hesston announced that the school would join the NAIA and the NCCAA, effective 2025–26.

== Administration ==
Presidents	Years served
Daniel Henry Bender	1909-1930
Edward Yoder, Chair, Administrative Comm.	1930-1932
Milo Kauffman	1932-1951
Walter Oswald, Chair, Administrative Comm.	1951-1953
Roy D. Roth	1953-1959
Tilman R. Smith	1959-1968
Laban Peachey	1968-1980
Jim Mininger (Interim)	1980-1981
Kirk Alliman	1981-1992
Jim Mininger (Interim)	1992-1993
Loren Swartzendruber	1993-2003
Peter Wiebe (Interim)	2003-2005
Howard Keim	2005-2016
Benjamin E. Sprunger (Interim)	2016-2017
Joseph A. Manickam	2017-2023
Ross Peterson-Veatch (Interim)	2023-Present

Academic Deans	Years served
John Denlinger Charles	1909-1923
Noah Oyer	1923-1924
Edward Yoder, (On leave)	1924-1928
Paul Erb (Acting)	1924-1928
Edward Yoder	1928-1932
Paul Erb	1932-1941
Ivan R. Lind	1941-1949
Walter Oswald	1949-1953
Justus Holsinger	1953-1959
Paul Bender (Acting)	1959-1961
Paton Yoder	1961-1970
Clayton Beyler (Acting)	1970-1971
Clayton Beyler	1971-1973
Gerri Lichti	1973-1978
Jim Mininger	1978-1995
Paul Keim	1995-1997
Bonnie Sowers (Interim)	1997-1998
Marcus Yoder	1998-2006
Bonnie Sowers (Interim)	2006-2007
Sandra Zerger	2007-2014
Brent Yoder	2014-20??
Dr. Carren Moham	20??-2021
Joan Griffing	2021-Present

as of January 2025

== Notable people ==
Alumni

- Theodore Epp, Christian clergyman, writer, and radio evangelist.
- John Hostetler, author, educator, and leading scholar of Amish and Hutterite societies.
- Christmas Kauffman, author of Mennonite Christian literature
- Jesse Martin, Canadian bishop and peace activist
- Katie Sowers, first female coach, and openly LGBTQ coach in the NFL.

Faculty

- Harold Bender, professor of theology
