= Emma Township, Kansas =

Township in Kansas, United States

Emma Township Harvey County, Kansas
- Township
- Location within Harvey County

- Location within state of Kansas
- Coordinates: 38°7′45″N 97°25′31″W
- Country: United States
- State: Kansas
- County: Harvey

Area
  - Total: 36.07 sq mi (93.42 km^{2})
  - Land: 36.07 sq mi (93.42 km^{2})
  - Water: 0 sq mi (0 km^{2}) 0%
- Elevation: 1,473 ft (449 m)

Population (2020)
  - Total: 4,038
  - Density: 112.0/sq mi (43.22/km^{2})
- Time zone: UTC-6 (CST)
  - Summer (DST): UTC-5 (CDT)
- FIPS code: 20-21025
- GNIS ID: 477763
- Website: County website

Emma Township is a township in Harvey County, Kansas, United States. As of the 2020 census, its population was 4,038.

== Geography ==
Emma Township covers an area of 36.07 square miles (93.4 km^{2}) and contains one incorporated settlement, Hesston. According to the USGS, it contains one cemetery, Church of God.

== Transportation ==
Emma Township contains one airport or landing strip, Weaver Ranch Airport.
