= Bell Township, Kansas =

Bell Township, Kansas may refer to:

- Bell Township, Reno County, Kansas
- Bell Township, Rice County, Kansas

== See also ==
- List of Kansas townships
- Bell Township (disambiguation)
