= 2013 Kansas City, Kansas, mayoral election =

2013 Kansas City, Kansas mayoral election
- February 26, 2013 (primary); April 2, 2013 (general)
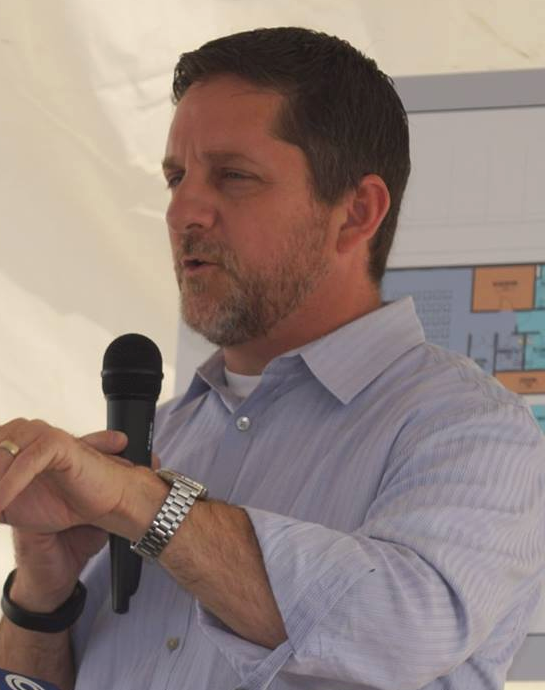

| Candidate | Mark Holland | Ann Murguia |
| Party | Nonpartisan | Nonpartisan |
| Popular vote | 9,359 | 7,248 |
| Percentage | 56% | 43.37% |
Mayor before election
Joe Reardon
Nonpartisan
Elected mayor
Mark Holland
Nonpartisan

The 2013 Kansas City, Kansas mayoral election took place on April 2, 2013, to elect the Mayor/CEO of the United Government of Wyandotte County and Kansas City, Kansas. The election is officially nonpartisan. Incumbent Joe Reardon did not run for a third term. Mark Holland and Ann Murguia were on the ballot in the general election. Holland defeated Murguia by over 1,500 votes.

== Primary Election ==
=== Candidates ===
Incumbent Joe Reardon chose not to run for a third term. The following people filed for candidacy.

- Nathan Barnes
- Mark Holland, pastor
- Cordell D. Meeks III
- Ann Murguia
- Janice (Grant) Witt

=== Election results ===
Holland and Murguia received enough votes to qualify for the general election on April 2, 2013.

Kansas City, Kansas mayoral primary election, 2013
| Party | Candidate | Votes | % |
|---|---|---|---|
| Nonpartisan | Mark Holland | 3,048 | 46.85% |
| Nonpartisan | Ann Murguia | 1,465 | 22.52% |
| Nonpartisan | Nathan Barnes | 1,258 | 19.34% |
| Nonpartisan | Cordell D. Meeks III | 511 | 7.85% |
| Nonpartisan | Janice (Grant) Witt | 224 | 3.44% |

== General Election ==
=== Candidates ===
- Mark Holland
- Ann Murguia

=== Election results ===
Kansas City, Kansas mayoral election, 2013 results
| Party | Candidate | Votes | % |
|---|---|---|---|
| Nonpartisan | Mark Holland | 9,359 | 56% |
| Nonpartisan | Ann Murguia | 7,248 | 43.37% |
| Nonpartisan | Write-ins | 105 | 0.65% |
