= Jack Reardon =

Jack Reardon may refer to:

- Jack Reardon (rugby league) (1914–1991), Australian rugby player
- Jack Reardon (politician) (1943–1988), American politician
- John P. Reardon (active 1978–2014), athletic director at Harvard
- Jack Reardon (songwriter) (active since 1959), American songwriter

== See also ==
- John Reardon (disambiguation)
