= 2022 United States Senate election in Kansas =

- November 8, 2022
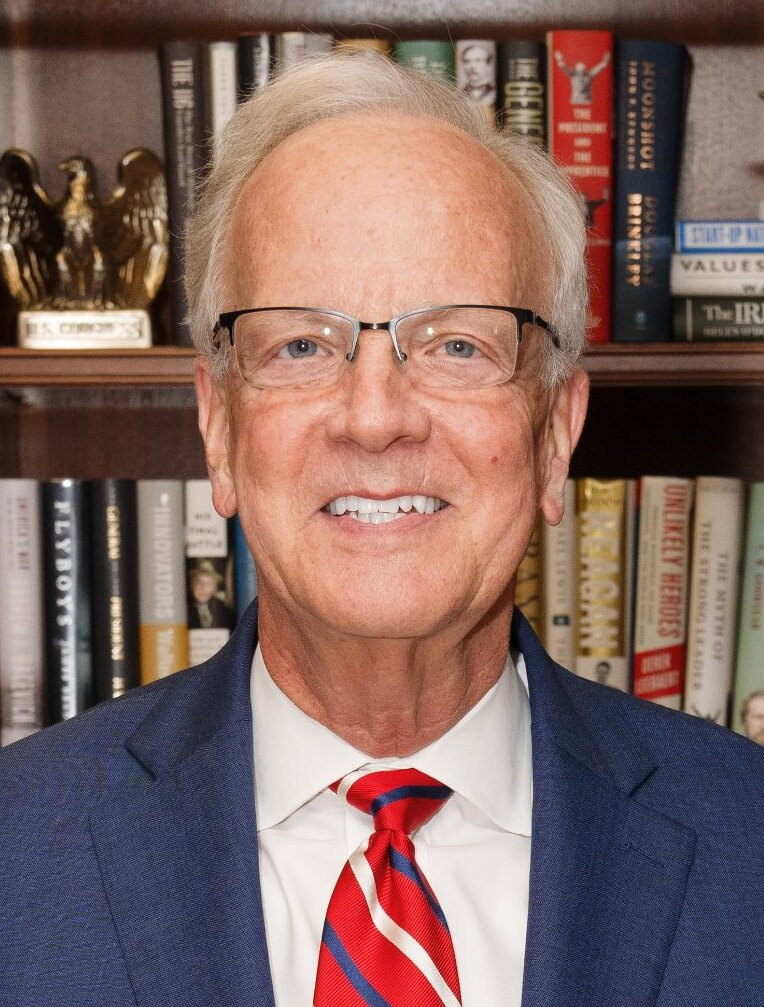

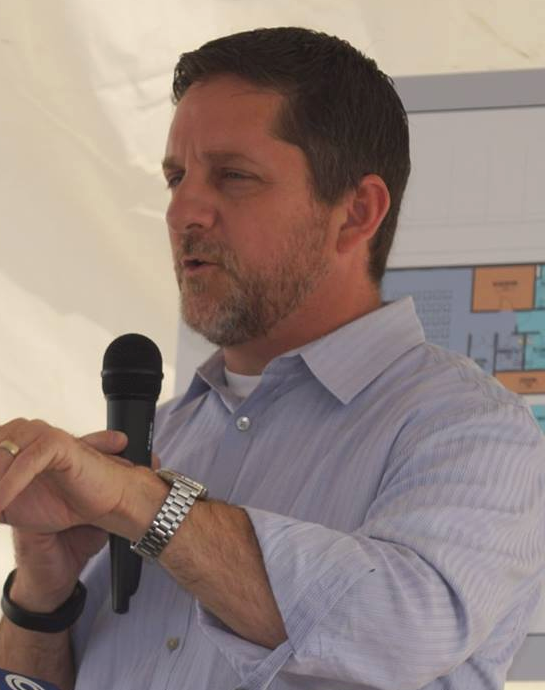
Nominee	Jerry Moran	Mark Holland
Party	Republican	Democratic
Popular vote	602,976	372,214
Percentage	60.00%	37.04%
- Moran: 40–50% 50–60% 60–70% 70–80% 80–90% >90% Holland: 40–50% 50–60% 60–70% 70–80% 80–90% >90% Graham: >90% Tie: 30–40% 40–50% 50% No votes
U.S. senator before election
Jerry Moran
Republican
Elected U.S. Senator
Jerry Moran
Republican

The 2022 United States Senate election in Kansas was held on November 8, 2022, to elect a member of the United States Senate to represent the state of Kansas. Incumbent Republican Senator Jerry Moran was first elected in 2010, winning the seat vacated by Sam Brownback, and ran for re-election to a third term in office. Democrat Mark Holland, the former mayor of Kansas City, was Moran's opponent in the general election.

Moran ultimately won the election, but his 60% share of the vote represented another decline from his first victory in 2010, and he lost Johnson County, a major suburban county that had been recently trending left in elections, for the first time in his career. Even so, he still won re-election by an overwhelming margin, despite incumbent Democratic governor Laura Kelly winning re-election on the same ballot. This was the first election since 2002 where the winner of the United States Senate election in Kansas was of a different party from the winner of the concurrent gubernatorial election, and the first election since 1968 where the winner of the United States Senate election in Kansas for the Class 3 Senate seat was of a different party from the winner of the concurrent gubernatorial election. This election officially tied the previous record previously held by Louisiana Democrats (1914 - 2002) in the direct election era for the most consecutive wins by the same party in the same state.

== Republican primary ==
=== Candidates ===
==== Nominee ====
- Jerry Moran, incumbent U.S. senator

==== Eliminated in primary ====
- Joan Farr, independent candidate for the U.S. Senate in Oklahoma in 2014 and 2020

==== Declined ====
- Mike Pompeo, former U.S. secretary of state, former director of the Central Intelligence Agency, and former U.S. representative for Kansas's 4th congressional district (endorsed Moran)

=== Endorsements ===
Jerry Moran

Executive branch officials

- Mike Pence, 48th vice president of the United States (2017–2021)
- Mike Pompeo, 70th secretary of state of the United States (2018–2021), 6th director of the Central Intelligence Agency (2017–2018)
- Donald Trump, 45th president of the United States (2017–2021)

Organizations

- Pro-Israel America

=== Results ===
Results by county: Moran: 70–80%; 80–90%; 90–100%

Republican primary results
Party	Candidate	Votes	%
Republican	Jerry Moran (incumbent)	383,332	80.5
Republican	Joan Farr	93,016	19.5
Total votes		476,348	100.0

== Democratic primary ==
=== Candidates ===
==== Nominee ====
- Mark Holland, United Methodist pastor and former mayor of Kansas City

===== Eliminated in primary =====
- Mike Andra, farmer
- Paul Buskirk, educator
- Robert Klingenberg, salesman and truck driver
- Michael Soetaert, former Republican candidate for Kansas's 1st congressional district in 2020
- Patrick Wiesner, bankruptcy attorney, candidate for U.S. Senate in 2010, 2014 and nominee in 2016

=== Results ===
Results by county: Holland: 20–30%; 30–40%; 40–50%; 70–80%; Buskirk: 20–30%; 30–40%; 40–50%; 50–60%; Andra: 20–30%; 30–40%; 40–50%; 50–60%; Klingenberg: 20–30%; 30–40%; 40–50%; 50–60%; Soetaert: 20–30%; 30–40%; Tie: 20–30%

Democratic primary results
Party	Candidate	Votes	%
Democratic	Mark Holland	101,429	38.1
Democratic	Paul Buskirk	53,750	20.2
Democratic	Patrick Wiesner	47,034	17.6
Democratic	Mike Andra	33,464	12.6
Democratic	Robert Klingenberg	21,413	8.0
Democratic	Michael Soetaert	9,464	3.6
Total votes		266,554	100.0

== Libertarian convention ==
=== Candidates ===
==== Nominee ====
- David Graham, attorney

== General election ==
=== Predictions ===
Source	Ranking	As of
The Cook Political Report	Solid R	November 19, 2021
Inside Elections	Solid R	January 7, 2022
Sabato's Crystal Ball	Safe R	November 3, 2021
Politico	Solid R	April 1, 2022
RCP	Safe R	January 10, 2022
Fox News	Solid R	May 12, 2022
DDHQ	Solid R	July 20, 2022
538	Solid R	June 30, 2022
The Economist	Safe R	September 7, 2022

=== Post-primary endorsements ===
Jerry Moran (R)

Organizations

- American Israel Public Affairs Committee
- Campaign for Working Families
- Kansans for Life
- Kansas Farm Bureau
- Kansas Livestock Association
- National Defense PAC
- National Rifle Association - Political Victory Fund
- National Right to Life Committee
Mark Holland (D)

Organizations

- Everytown for Gun Safety
- National Education Association
- Vote Common Good

Newspapers

- The Kansas City Star

=== Polling ===
Graphical summary

Poll source	Date(s) administered	Sample size (Note: Key: A – all adults RV – registered voters LV – likely voters V – unclear)	Margin of error	Jerry Moran (R)	Mark Holland (D)	Other	Undecided
Emerson College	October 27–29, 2022	1,000 (LV)	± 3.0%	54%	33%	5% (Note: Graham (L) with 1%; "Someone else" with 2%)	8%
Emerson College	September 15–18, 2022	1,000 (LV)	± 3.0%	45%	33%	4% (Note: "Someone else" with 4%)	18%
Echelon Insights (Note: This poll was sponsored by NetChoice.)	August 31 – September 7, 2022	392 (LV)	± 7.5%	54%	35%	–	11%
Battleground Connect (R) (Note: This poll was sponsored by the John Brown Freedom Fund.)	August 8–10, 2022	1,074 (LV)	± 3.0%	58%	37%	–	5%

=== Results ===
2022 United States Senate election in Kansas
Party	Candidate	Votes	%	±%
Republican	Jerry Moran (incumbent)	602,976	60.00%	−2.18%
Democratic	Mark Holland	372,214	37.04%	+4.80%
Libertarian	David Graham	29,766	2.96%	−2.62%
Total votes		1,004,956	100.0%	
Republican hold				

==== By county ====
County	Jerry Moran Republican		Mark Holland Democratic		David Graham Libertarian		Margin		Total
County	#	%	#	%	#	%	#	%	Total
Allen	3,014	73.1%	984	23.9%	124	3.0%	2,030	49.2%	4,122
Anderson	2,291	79.0%	505	17.4%	105	3.6%	1,786	61.6%	2,901
Atchison	3,936	71.7%	1,413	25.8%	137	2.5%	2,523	45.9%	5,486
Barber	1,521	87.6%	169	9.7%	47	2.7%	1,352	77.9%	1,737
Barton	6,626	82.1%	1,232	15.3%	214	2.7%	5,394	66.8%	8,072
Bourbon	3,561	74.4%	1,050	21.9%	176	3.7%	2,511	52.5%	4,787
Brown	2,588	77.2%	646	19.3%	119	3.5%	1,942	57.9%	3,353
Butler	16,962	71.6%	5,987	25.3%	726	3.1%	10,975	46.3%	23,675
Chase	898	76.3%	245	20.8%	34	2.9%	653	55.5%	1,177
Chautauqua	991	84.5%	151	12.9%	31	2.6%	840	71.6%	1,173
Cherokee	4,716	73.6%	1,492	23.3%	199	3.1%	3,224	50.3%	6,407
Cheyenne	903	86.9%	112	10.8%	24	2.3%	791	76.1%	1,039
Clark	725	84.9%	95	11.1%	34	4.0%	630	73.8%	854
Clay	2,711	82.2%	479	14.5%	107	3.2%	2,232	67.7%	3,297
Cloud	2,575	80.2%	530	16.5%	104	3.2%	2,045	63.7%	3,209
Coffey	2,733	79.5%	574	16.7%	130	3.8%	2,159	62.8%	3,437
Comanche	652	87.6%	67	9.0%	25	3.4%	585	78.6%	744
Cowley	7,362	69.4%	2,867	27.0%	382	3.6%	4,495	42.4%	10,611
Crawford	7,154	60.6%	4,276	36.2%	367	3.1%	2,878	24.4%	11,797
Decatur	986	87.3%	114	10.1%	29	2.6%	872	77.2%	1,129
Dickinson	5,446	78.8%	1,239	17.9%	227	3.3%	4,207	60.9%	6,912
Doniphan	2,159	81.8%	405	15.4%	74	2.8%	1,754	66.4%	2,638
Douglas	14,501	30.7%	31,415	66.6%	1,245	2.6%	-16,914	-35.9%	47,161
Edwards	923	84.8%	139	12.8%	27	2.5%	784	76.0%	1,089
Elk	891	83.9%	132	12.4%	39	3.7%	759	71.5%	1,062
Ellis	7,920	75.3%	2,236	21.3%	362	3.4%	5,684	54.0%	10,518
Ellsworth	1,821	81.1%	359	16.0%	64	2.9%	1,462	65.1%	2,264
Finney	5,162	72.1%	1,793	25.0%	205	2.9%	3,369	47.1%	7,160
Ford	4,350	72.9%	1,452	24.3%	164	2.7%	2,898	48.6%	5,966
Franklin	6,678	70.2%	2,505	26.3%	329	3.5%	4,173	43.9%	9,512
Geary	3,799	62.8%	2,038	33.7%	214	3.5%	1,761	29.1%	6,051
Gove	1,049	90.7%	86	7.4%	21	1.8%	963	83.3%	1,156
Graham	845	84.3%	109	10.9%	48	4.8%	736	73.4%	1,002
Grant	1,362	84.8%	206	12.8%	38	2.4%	1,156	76.0%	1,606
Gray	1,476	86.7%	179	10.5%	47	2.8%	1,297	76.2%	1,702
Greeley	402	88.7%	38	8.4%	13	2.9%	364	80.3%	453
Greenwood	1,863	80.6%	371	16.0%	78	3.4%	1,492	64.6%	2,312
Hamilton	529	88.3%	63	10.5%	7	1.2%	466	77.8%	599
Harper	1,665	84.4%	248	12.6%	60	3.0%	1,417	71.8%	1,973
Harvey	8,127	63.4%	4,325	33.8%	357	2.8%	3,802	29.6%	12,809
Haskell	862	87.4%	103	10.4%	21	2.1%	759	77.0%	986
Hodgeman	700	88.2%	78	9.8%	16	2.0%	622	78.4%	794
Jackson	3,791	74.3%	1,122	22.0%	192	3.8%	2,669	52.3%	5,105
Jefferson	5,208	68.6%	2,160	28.4%	226	3.0%	3,048	40.2%	7,594
Jewell	1,055	87.6%	117	9.7%	33	2.7%	938	77.9%	1,205
Johnson	125,715	48.0%	129,199	49.3%	7,137	2.7%	-3,484	-1.3%	262,051
Kearny	847	89.1%	85	8.9%	19	2.0%	762	80.2%	951
Kingman	2,527	81.7%	500	16.2%	67	2.2%	2,027	65.5%	3,094
Kiowa	825	88.1%	82	8.8%	29	3.1%	743	79.3%	936
Labette	4,021	67.8%	1,725	29.1%	186	3.1%	2,296	38.7%	5,932
Lane	596	88.7%	57	8.5%	19	2.8%	539	80.2%	672
Leavenworth	16,570	61.7%	9,444	35.2%	843	3.1%	7,126	26.5%	26,857
Lincoln	1,020	85.1%	128	10.7%	50	4.2%	892	74.4%	1,198
Linn	3,017	81.2%	593	16.0%	105	2.8%	2,424	65.2%	3,715
Logan	979	90.1%	82	7.6%	25	2.3%	897	82.5%	1,086
Lyon	6,203	61.7%	3,549	35.3%	300	3.0%	2,654	26.4%	10,052
Marion	3,801	79.0%	901	18.7%	111	2.3%	2,900	60.3%	4,813
Marshall	3,043	78.3%	755	19.4%	87	2.2%	2,288	58.9%	3,885
McPherson	8,268	74.1%	2,593	23.2%	293	2.6%	5,675	50.9%	11,154
Meade	1,154	88.0%	123	9.4%	34	2.6%	1,031	78.6%	1,311
Miami	9,475	70.4%	3,574	26.6%	404	3.0%	5,901	43.8%	13,453
Mitchell	2,023	85.3%	291	12.3%	58	2.4%	1,732	72.0%	2,372
Montgomery	7,117	74.8%	2,105	22.1%	294	3.1%	5,012	52.7%	9,516
Morris	1,724	77.3%	436	19.6%	69	3.1%	1,288	57.7%	2,229
Morton	696	87.9%	62	7.8%	34	4.3%	634	80.1%	792
Nemaha	3,931	85.8%	543	11.9%	105	2.3%	3,388	73.9%	4,579
Neosho	3,751	73.5%	1,194	23.4%	155	3.0%	2,557	50.1%	5,100
Ness	1,057	91.8%	64	5.6%	31	2.7%	993	86.2%	1,152
Norton	1,551	86.6%	200	11.2%	41	2.3%	1,351	75.4%	1,792
Osage	4,716	75.5%	1,320	21.1%	214	3.4%	3,396	54.4%	6,250
Osborne	1,245	86.5%	133	9.2%	61	4.2%	1,112	77.3%	1,439
Ottawa	1,986	83.6%	280	11.8%	109	4.6%	1,706	71.8%	2,375
Pawnee	1,691	78.8%	376	17.5%	78	3.6%	1,315	61.3%	2,145
Phillips	1,988	90.4%	156	7.1%	55	2.5%	1,832	83.3%	2,199
Pottawatomie	8,113	77.6%	2,073	19.8%	266	2.5%	6,040	57.8%	10,452
Pratt	2,419	77.8%	591	19.0%	99	3.2%	1,828	58.8%	3,109
Rawlins	1,010	87.4%	109	9.4%	36	3.1%	901	78.0%	1,155
Reno	14,459	70.0%	5,467	26.5%	717	3.5%	8,992	43.5%	20,643
Republic	1,647	83.8%	244	12.4%	75	3.8%	1,403	71.4%	1,966
Rice	2,510	81.1%	494	16.0%	92	3.0%	2,016	65.1%	3,096
Riley	9,761	53.8%	7,950	43.8%	439	2.4%	1,811	10.0%	18,150
Rooks	1,775	85.1%	183	8.8%	127	6.1%	1,592	76.3%	2,085
Rush	1,157	86.7%	130	9.7%	47	3.5%	1,027	77.0%	1,334
Russell	2,263	84.1%	327	12.2%	101	3.8%	7,394	75.9%	17,620
Saline	12,174	69.1%	4,780	27.1%	666	3.8%	7,394	42.0%	17,260
Scott	1,517	89.1%	131	7.7%	55	3.2%	1,386	81.4%	1,703
Sedgwick	90,856	59.0%	68,815	38.2%	4,446	2.9%	32,041	20.8%	154,117
Seward	2,127	72.3%	722	24.5%	92	3.1%	1,405	47.8%	2,941
Shawnee	35,517	54.1%	28,051	42.7%	2,068	3.2%	7,466	11.4%	65,636
Sheridan	954	90.9%	65	6.2%	30	2.9%	889	84.7%	1,049
Sherman	1,726	84.4%	227	11.1%	92	4.5%	1,499	73.3%	2,045
Smith	1,410	85.9%	171	10.4%	60	3.7%	1,239	75.5%	1,641
Stafford	1,320	84.1%	189	12.0%	61	3.9%	1,131	76.1%	1,570
Stanton	453	89.0%	41	8.1%	15	2.9%	412	80.9%	509
Stevens	1,256	89.9%	115	8.2%	26	1.9%	1,141	81.7%	1,397
Sumner	5,896	74.9%	1,692	21.5%	281	3.6%	4,204	53.4%	7,869
Thomas	2,457	85.1%	355	12.3%	74	2.6%	2,102	72.8%	2,886
Trego	1,105	87.6%	123	9.7%	34	2.7%	982	77.9%	1,262
Wabaunsee	2,625	78.5%	596	17.8%	121	3.6%	588	60.7%	3,342
Wallace	618	92.0%	30	4.5%	24	3.6%	588	87.5%	672
Washington	2,014	89.9%	190	8.5%	36	1.6%	1,824	81.4%	2,240
Wichita	627	87.9%	64	9.0%	22	3.1%	563	78.9%	713
Wilson	2,705	81.4%	535	16.1%	82	2.5%	2,170	65.3%	3,322
Woodson	938	79.5%	187	15.8%	55	4.7%	751	63.7%	1,180
Wyandotte	12,541	36.0%	21,111	60.6%	1,193	3.4%	-8,570	-24.6%	34,845
Totals	602,976	60.0%	372,214	37.0%	29,766	3.0%	230,762	23.0%	1,004,956

Counties that flipped from Republican to Democratic

- Johnson (largest city: Overland Park)

==== By congressional district ====
Moran won all four congressional districts, including one that elected a Democrat.

District	Moran	Holland	Representative
1st	68%	29%	Tracey Mann
2nd	61%	35%	Jake LaTurner
3rd	50%	47%	Sharice Davids
4th	64%	33%	Ron Estes

== See also ==
- Elections in Kansas
- Political party strength in Kansas
- Kansas Democratic Party
- Kansas Republican Party
- Government of Kansas
- 2022 Kansas gubernatorial election
- 2022 United States House of Representatives elections in Kansas
- 2022 Kansas House of Representatives election
- 2022 Kansas elections
- 2022 United States Senate elections
- 2022 United States elections

== Notes ==
Partisan clients
