= Sterling High School (Kansas) =

Location
- 308 East Washington Avenue; Sterling, Kansas 67579; United States; 38.215923°N 98.202911°W

Information
- School type: Public, High School
- School board: Board Website
- School district: Sterling USD 376
- CEEB code: 172830
- Principal: Wes Laudermilk
- Grades: 7 to 12
- Gender: coed
- Enrollment: 150 (2026-27)
- Campus type: Rural
- Colors: Black; White
- Slogan: Learning for All, Excellence in Teaching
- Fight song: Stein Song
- Athletics: Class 2A
- Athletics conference: Heart Of America League
- Mascot: Black Bear
- Rival: Lyons High School
- Publication: Cub Reporter
- Yearbook: The Cub
- Website: School Website

Sterling High School is a public secondary school in Sterling, Kansas, United States operated by Sterling USD 376 school district. It serves students of grades 7 to 12 in the communities of Sterling, Alden, Saxman, and nearby rural areas.

== Athletics ==
Athletic programs offered at Sterling High School include American football, cross country, volleyball, tennis, track and field, golf, softball, basketball, cheerleading, wrestling, and the recently added baseball.

Boys state championships:

- Basketball - 2012, 2025, 2026
- Cross Country - 2005, 2006, 2007
- Football - 1982, 2025
- Tennis - 2017
- Track and Field - 1983, 1984

Girls state championships:

- Basketball - 2021, 2022
- Track and Field - 1980, 1988, 1990, 1991

== Other activities ==
Other extracurricular activities offered are choir, band, musicals/plays, FBLA, FCCLA, and FFA.

Sterling High School is best known for its debate and forensics programs. Since 1990, Sterling High School has won 30 State Championships in Forensics at the 2A and 3A levels. In addition, Sterling High School has produced 10 State Championship and multiple State Runner-Up Debate teams. The vast majority of the championship teams were led by KSHSAA Hall of Fame coach Betsy Dutton.

== See also ==
- List of high schools in Kansas
- List of unified school districts in Kansas
