= John Reardon (disambiguation) =

John Reardon (born 1975) is an actor.

John Reardon may also refer to:

- Beans Reardon (born John Reardon; 1897–1984), baseball umpire
- John Reardon (baritone) (1930–1988), opera baritone
- John Riordan (banker), banker
- John P. Reardon, American university administrator
- Jack Reardon (politician) (born John E. Reardon; 1943–1988), American politician
