= 2017 Kansas City, Kansas, mayoral election =

2017 Kansas City, Kansas mayoral election
- August 2017 (primary); November 7, 2017 (general)

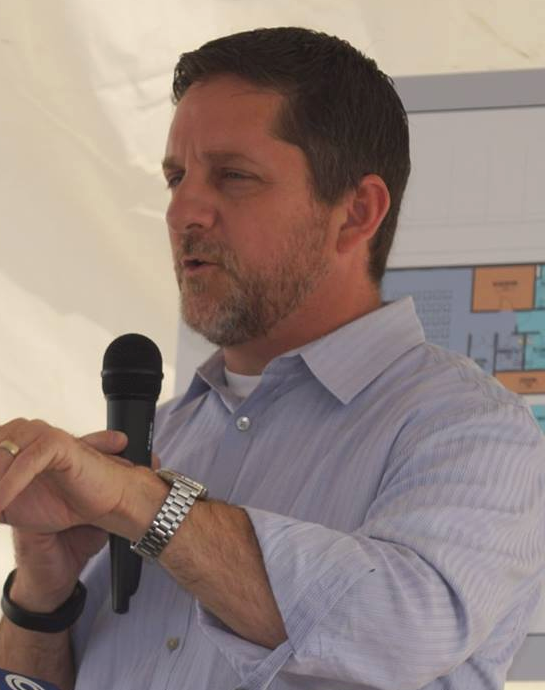
Candidate	David Alvey	Mark Holland
Party	Nonpartisan	Nonpartisan
Popular vote	9,727	8,893
Percentage	51.84%	47.4%
Mayor before election
Mark Holland
Nonpartisan
Elected mayor
David Alvey
Nonpartisan

The 2017 Kansas City, Kansas mayoral election took place on November 7, 2017, to elect the Mayor/CEO of the United Government of Wyandotte County and Kansas City, Kansas. The election is officially nonpartisan. Incumbent Mark Holland ran for reelection and faced David Alvey in the general election. Alvey and Holland received 51.84% and 47.4% of the vote respectively. Holland conceded on election night.

== Primary Election ==
=== Candidates ===
The following people filed for candidacy in the primary.

- Mark Holland, incumbent mayor
  - Filed for re-election on February 6, 2017.
- David Alvey, director on the Board of Public Utilities
- David Haley, Kansas state senator
- Janice Grant Witt, financial services broker
- D. Keith Jordan, Kansas City radio personality

=== Election results ===
Holland and Alvey received enough votes in the primary to go on to the general election in November.

Kansas City, Kansas mayoral primary election, 2017
Party	Candidate	Votes	%
Nonpartisan	Mark Holland (incumbent)	5,491	40.06%
Nonpartisan	David Alvey	4,334	31.62%
Nonpartisan	David Haley	2,539	18.52%
Nonpartisan	Janice Grant Witt	1,019	7.43%
Nonpartisan	D. Keith Jordan	325	2.37%

== General Election ==
=== Candidates ===
- Mark Holland, incumbent mayor
- David Alvey

=== Election results ===
The general election took place on November 7, 2017. Holland conceded the election to Alvey the same day.

Kansas City, Kansas mayoral election, 2017 results
Party	Candidate	Votes	%
Nonpartisan	David Alvey	9,727	51.84%
Nonpartisan	Mark Holland (incumbent)	8,893	47.40%
Nonpartisan	Write-ins	142	0.76%
