= East Washington Township, Kansas =

Township in Rice County, Kansas, U.S.

East Washington Township
- Township
- Location within Rice County
- Coordinates: 38.232958°N 97.982367°W
- Country: United States
- State: Kansas
- County: Rice

Government
  - District 2 County Commissioner: Clay Thomas

Area
  - Total: 36.07 sq mi (93.4 km^{2})
  - Land: 36.058 sq mi (93.39 km^{2})
  - Water: 0.012 sq mi (0.031 km^{2}) 0.03%

Population (2020)
  - Total: 138
  - Density: 3.83/sq mi (1.48/km^{2})
- Time zone: UTC-6 (CST)
  - Summer (DST): UTC-5 (CDT)
- Area code: 620
- GNIS feature ID: 475811

East Washington Township is a township in Rice County, Kansas, United States. As of the 2020 census, its population was 138.

== History ==
East Washington Township and West Washington Township were originally one township called Washington Township. Washington Township was created in 1874 from parts of Atlanta Township and Sterling Township. Washington Township would lose land to the newly formed Wilson Township and Rockville Township before being split into two.

== Geography ==
East Washington Township covers an area of 36.07 square miles (93.4 square kilometers).

=== Adjacent townships ===
Rockville Township, Rice County
		north	northeast	Hayes Township, McPherson County
West Washington Township, Rice County	west	self	east	Little Valley Township, McPherson County
		south	southeast	Medora Township, Reno County
Grant Township, Reno County
