= Little Valley Township, Kansas =

Township in McPherson County, Kansas, US

Little Valley Township
- Township
- Location within McPherson County
- Coordinates: 38.23°N 97.87°W
- Country: United States
- State: Kansas
- County: McPherson

Area
  - Total: 35.987 sq mi (93.21 km^{2})
  - Land: 35.981 sq mi (93.19 km^{2})
  - Water: 0.006 sq mi (0.016 km^{2}) 0.02%

Population (2020)
  - Total: 391
  - Density: 10.9/sq mi (4.20/km^{2})
- Time zone: UTC-6 (CST)
  - Summer (DST): UTC-5 (CDT)
- Area code: 620

Little Valley Township is a township in McPherson County, Kansas, United States.

== History ==
Little Valley Township was organized in 1874.

== Geography ==
Little Valley Township covers an area of 35.987 square miles (93.21 square kilometers).

=== Adjacent townships ===
- Hayes Township, McPherson County (north)
- Groveland Township, McPherson County (northeast)
- Superior Township, McPherson County (east)
- Medora Township, Reno County (south)
- Grant Township, Reno County (southwest)
- East Washington Township, Rice County (west)

=== Major highways ===
- K-61
