= Hayes Township, Reno County, Kansas =

Township in Reno County, Kansas, U.S.

Hayes Township
- Township
- Location within Reno County
- Coordinates: 38.104446°N 98.390218°W
- Country: United States
- State: Kansas
- County: Reno
- Established: 1877

Government
  - District 2 County Commissioner: Ron Hirst

Area
  - Total: 72.002 sq mi (186.48 km^{2})
  - Land: 71.932 sq mi (186.30 km^{2})
  - Water: 0.07 sq mi (0.18 km^{2}) 0.10%

Population (2020)
  - Total: 89
  - Density: 1.2/sq mi (0.48/km^{2})
- Time zone: UTC-6 (CST)
  - Summer (DST): UTC-5 (CDT)
- Area code: 620
- GNIS feature ID: 473610

Hayes Township is a township in Reno County, Kansas, United States. As of the 2020 census, its population was 89.

== History ==
The first township in Reno County was Reno Township, which covered the whole county upon its creation in 1872. From Reno Township and part of Rice County, Medford Township was created in 1874. Hayes Township would be split off from Medford Township in 1877. In the 1910s, Hayes Township was split into two, with the northern half becoming North Hayes Township. The two townships were merged back together in the 1970s.

== Geography ==
Hayes Township covers an area of 72.002 square miles (186.48 square kilometers). The Quivira National Wildlife Refuge lies partially in it.

=== Adjacent townships ===
Bell Township, Rice County
Putnam Township, Stafford County	northwest	north	northeast	Valley Township, Rice County
East Cooper Township, Stafford County	west	self	east	Walnut Township, Reno County; Huntsville Township, Reno County
Fairview Township, Stafford County	southwest	south	southeast	Plevna Township, Reno County
Sylvia Township, Reno County
