= Bob Peck (athletic director) =

American athletic director and coach

Biographical details
- Born: November 27, 1928; Hackensack, New Jersey, U.S.
- Died: October 15, 2021 (aged 92); Bennington, Vermont, U.S.
- Education: Stetson University (1951); New York University; Teachers College, Columbia University

Playing career

Football
- 1947–1948: Montclair State
- 1949–1950: Stetson
- 1953: Quantico Marines
- Position: Center

Coaching career (HC unless noted)

Basketball
- 1951–1952: Forsyth HS (GA)
- 1955–1956: Bates
- 1958–1962: Bates
- 1963–1965: Bates
- 1981–1982: Williams

Football
- 1951: Forsyth HS (GA)
- 1954: 1st Marine Division
- 1955: Bates (line)
- 1958–1964: Bates (line)

Administrative career (AD unless noted)
- 1965–1970: Boston University
- 1971–2001: Williams

Head coaching record
- Overall: 100–96 (college basketball)
- Tournaments: 1–1

Robert Russell Peck (November 27, 1928 – October 15, 2021) was an American athletics administrator who served as athletic director at Boston University from 1965 to 1970 and Williams College from 1971 to 2001.

== Early life ==
Peck was born in Hackensack, New Jersey and raised in nearby Teaneck, New Jersey. He attended Teaneck High School, where he lettered in football, basketball and baseball. He then attended Montclair State Teachers College, where he played basketball, threw the javelin in track and field, and was captain of the football team. After two years he transferred to Stetson University, where he played football and basketball. After graduating in 1951, Peck began his coaching career at Forsyth High School in Cumming, Georgia. After one year as the school's football and basketball coach, Peck resumed his education at New York University. After earning his master's degree, Peck was commissioned a lieutenant in the United States Marine Corps. He played for the Quantico Marines Devil Dogs football team and in 1954 coached the 1st Marine Division football team to the Eighth United States Army championship.

== Coaching ==
In 1955, Peck joined the staff of Bates College as a physical education instructor and head basketball and tennis coach. He left the school after one year but returned in 1958 after earning his doctorate in physical education from Columbia University's Teachers College. In his seven seasons as the Bobcats men's basketball coach, he led team to a 88–86 record and an appearance in the 1961 NCAA College Division basketball tournament. He returned to coaching in 1981 as interim head coach of the Williams basketball team. The Ephs went 12–10 in their one season under Peck.

== Administration ==
In 1965, Peck was named athletic director at Boston University. During his tenure, the school started construction on a new athletic complex (the Harold Case Physical Education Center), resurfaced Nickerson Field with AstroTurf, and introduced new sports, including wrestling. He also coordinated the school's physical education program and oversaw intramural sports. He resigned in 1970 to become a professor at North Carolina A&T State University.

On October 27, 1970, it was announced that Peck would become the athletic director at Williams College effective July 1, 1971. As Williams AD, Peck integrated women into the Ephs athletic program and oversaw the improvement of the school's athletic facilities. Under his leadership, Williams won the NACDA Directors' Cup four times. In 1977, Peck was chosen by a search committee to become the next athletic director at Harvard University. However, he was opposed by a group of Harvard athletes and alumni who wanted the job to go to Baaron Pittenger or John P. Reardon. He withdrew as a candidate and remained at Williams until his retirement in 2001.

== Personal life ==
Peck was passionate about civil rights, affirmative action, and global peace. He coached basketball in Finland, Sweden, Scotland, Columbia, Cost Rica, Italy, and Zimbabwe, took the Williams men's basketball team to play in Cuba, and took optometrists and students to Nicaragua to provide eye care. He won a United Methodist Church award for social justice action.

Peck was married to his first wife, Dr. Jane Cary Chapman Peck, for 33 years. Dr. Jane Cary Peck was a professor of religion at the Andover Newton Theological School and represented the United Methodist Church on the governing board of the National Council of Churches. The Pecks had two children and adopted two more. Jane Cary Peck died in 1990. Peck and his second wife, Lynn Hood, were married for 28 years and were longtime residents of Pownal, Vermont.

Peck died on October 15, 2021.
