= West Washington Township, Kansas =

Township in Rice County, Kansas, U.S.

West Washington Township
- Township
- Location within Rice County
- Coordinates: 38.210098°N 98.078309°W
- Country: United States
- State: Kansas
- County: Rice

Government
  - District 2 County Commissioner: Clay Thomas

Area
  - Total: 35.797 sq mi (92.71 km^{2})
  - Land: 35.755 sq mi (92.61 km^{2})
  - Water: 0.042 sq mi (0.11 km^{2}) 0.12%

Population (2020)
  - Total: 118
  - Density: 3.30/sq mi (1.27/km^{2})
- Time zone: UTC-6 (CST)
  - Summer (DST): UTC-5 (CDT)
- Area code: 620
- GNIS feature ID: 475796

West Washington Township is a township in Rice County, Kansas, United States. As of the 2020 census, its population was 118.

== History ==
West Washington Township and East Washington Township were originally one township called Washington Township. Washington Township was created in 1874 from parts of Atlanta Township and Sterling Township. Washington Township would lose land to the newly formed Wilson Township and Rockville Township before being split into two.

== Geography ==
West Washington Township covers an area of 35.797 square miles (92.71 square kilometers). Cow Creek flows through it.

=== Adjacent townships ===
Wilson Township, Rice County
		north	northeast	Rockville Township, Rice County
Sterling Township, Rice County	west	self	east	East Washington Township, Rice County
		south
Grant Township, Reno County

== Transportation ==
=== Major highways ===
- K-14
- K-96
