= Bell Township =

Bell Township may refer to:

- Bell Township, Reno County, Kansas, in Reno County, Kansas
- Bell Township, Rice County, Kansas, in Rice County, Kansas
- Bell Township, Cass County, North Dakota, in Cass County, North Dakota
- Bell Township, Clearfield County, Pennsylvania
- Bell Township, Jefferson County, Pennsylvania
- Bell Township, Westmoreland County, Pennsylvania
