= 2021 Kansas City, Kansas, mayoral election =

2021 Kansas City, Kansas mayoral election
- November 2, 2021
- Turnout: 19.03% (Note: Counted by dividing the total number of ballots cast with the total number of registered voters.)
Candidate	Tyrone Garner	David Alvey
Party	Nonpartisan	Nonpartisan
Popular vote	8,531	8,133
Percentage	50.8%	48.4%
Mayor before election
David Alvey
Elected mayor
Tyrone Garner

The 2021 Kansas City, Kansas mayoral election was held on November 2, 2021, for the office of Mayor/CEO of the United Government of Wyandotte County and Kansas City, Kansas. The election was officially nonpartisan, with a primary being held on August 3, 2021. Incumbent David Alvey and Tyrone Garner took the top two spots in the primary election and were on ballot in the general election. Garner defeated Alvey, becoming the first African-American mayor of Kansas City.

== Primary election ==
=== Candidates ===
The following people filed for candidacy and were on the ballot for the primary election.

- David Alvey, incumbent mayor
- Daren Duffy
- Tyrone Garner, U.S. Army veteran and former KCKPD deputy chief
- Chris Steineger, former United Government District 6 senator
- Janice (Grant) Witt, CEO of Reola Grant Center

=== Results ===
Tyrone Garner and David Alvey received enough votes to move on to the general election in November.

Kansas City, Kansas mayoral primary election, 2021 results
Party	Candidate	Votes	%
Nonpartisan	Tyrone Garner	3,575	28.18%
Nonpartisan	David Alvey (incumbent)	3,527	27.8%
Nonpartisan	Chris Steineger	2,733	21.55%
Nonpartisan	Janice (Grant) Witt	1,849	14.58%
Nonpartisan	Darren Duffy	1,001	7.89%
Total votes		12,685	100%
Turnout		12,758	14.36%
Registered electors		88,825	

== General election ==
The general election took place on November 2, 2021.

Kansas City, Kansas mayoral general election, 2021 results
Party	Candidate	Votes	%
Nonpartisan	Tyrone Garner	8,531	50.76
Nonpartisan	David Alvey (incumbent)	8,133	48.39
Write-in		144	0.86
Total votes		16,808	100% (Note: The percentage of votes above don't add up to 100% due to rounding.)
Turnout		16,992	19.03%
Registered electors		89,294	
