= Harrison Township, Rice County, Kansas =

Township in Rice County, Kansas, U.S.

Harrison Township
- Township
- Location within Rice County
- Coordinates: 38.393389°N 98.20458°W
- Country: United States
- State: Kansas
- County: Rice

Government
  - District 1 County Commissioner: Derek McCloud

Area
  - Total: 35.214 sq mi (91.20 km^{2})
  - Land: 35.191 sq mi (91.14 km^{2})
  - Water: 0.023 sq mi (0.060 km^{2}) 0.07%

Population (2020)
  - Total: 142
  - Density: 4.04/sq mi (1.56/km^{2})
- Time zone: UTC-6 (CST)
  - Summer (DST): UTC-5 (CDT)
- Area code: 620
- GNIS feature ID: 475673

Harrison Township is a township in Rice County, Kansas, United States. As of the 2020 census, its population was 142.

== History ==
Harrison Township was created from parts of Victoria Township and Atlanta Township.

== Geography ==
Harrison Township covers an area of 35.214 square miles (91.20 square kilometers).

=== Adjacent townships ===
Victoria Township, Rice County
Eureka Township, Rice County	northwest	north	northeast	Galt Township, Rice County
Lincoln Township, Rice County	west	self	east	Mitchell Township, Rice County
Center Township, Rice County	southwest	south	southeast	Wilson Township, Rice County
Atlanta Township, Rice County

== Transportation ==
=== Major highways ===
- US-56
- K-14
- K-96
