= Walnut Township, Reno County, Kansas =

Township in Reno County, Kansas, U.S.

Walnut Township
- Township
- Location within Reno County
- Coordinates: 38.129904°N 98.307543°W
- Country: United States
- State: Kansas
- County: Reno

Government
  - District 2 County Commissioner: Ron Hirst

Area
  - Total: 36.281 sq mi (93.97 km^{2})
  - Land: 36.281 sq mi (93.97 km^{2})
  - Water: 0 sq mi (0 km^{2}) 0%

Population (2020)
  - Total: 103
  - Density: 2.84/sq mi (1.10/km^{2})
- Time zone: UTC-6 (CST)
  - Summer (DST): UTC-5 (CDT)
- Area code: 620
- GNIS feature ID: 475892

Walnut Township is a township in Reno County, Kansas, United States. As of the 2020 census, its population was 103.

== Geography ==
Walnut Township covers an area of 36.281 square miles (93.97 square kilometers).

=== Adjacent townships ===
Valley Township, Rice County
Bell Township, Rice County	northwest	north	northeast	Sterling Township, Rice County
Hayes Township, Reno County	west	self	east	Medford Township, Reno County
		south	southeast	Enterprise Township, Reno County
Huntsville Township, Reno County
