= Union Township, Rice County, Kansas =

Township in Rice County, Kansas, U.S.

Union Township
- Township
- Location within Rice County
- Coordinates: 38.391°N 97.980°W
- Country: United States
- State: Kansas
- County: Rice
- Established: 1874

Government
  - District 3 County Commissioner: Terry David

Area
  - Total: 36.048 sq mi (93.36 km^{2})
  - Land: 36.048 sq mi (93.36 km^{2})
  - Water: 0 sq mi (0 km^{2}) 0%

Population (2020)
  - Total: 661
  - Density: 18.3/sq mi (7.08/km^{2})
- Time zone: UTC-6 (CST)
  - Summer (DST): UTC-5 (CDT)
- Area code: 620
- GNIS feature ID: 475683

Union Township is a township in Rice County, Kansas, United States. As of the 2020 census, its population was 661.

== History ==
Union Township was established in 1874, being split off from Atlanta Township. What would become Union Township was first settled in March 1870 by C. S. Lindell. Galt Township, Mitchell Township, Wilson Township, and Rockville Township were all established from land that was part of Union Township. Part of Union Township was separated in the 1910s to form Odessa Township.

== Geography ==
Union Township covers an area of 36.048 square miles (93.36 square kilometers).

=== Communities ===
- Little River

=== Adjacent townships ===
Odessa Township, Rice County
Galt Township, Rice County	northwest	north	northeast	South Sharps Creek Township, McPherson County
Mitchell Township, Rice County	west	self	east	Castle Township, McPherson County
Wilson Township, Rice County	southwest	south	southeast	Hayes Township, McPherson County
Rockville Township, Rice County

== Transportation ==
=== Major highways ===
- US-56
- K-46
