= Raymond Township, Kansas =

Township in Rice County, Kansas, U.S.

Raymond Township
- Township
- Location within Rice County
- Coordinates: 38.30420°N 98.42457°W
- Country: United States
- State: Kansas
- County: Rice
- Established: 1874

Government
  - District 2 County Commissioner: Clay Thomas

Area
  - Total: 35.925 sq mi (93.05 km^{2})
  - Land: 35.629 sq mi (92.28 km^{2})
  - Water: 0.296 sq mi (0.77 km^{2}) 0.82%

Population (2020)
  - Total: 169
  - Density: 4.74/sq mi (1.83/km^{2})
- Time zone: UTC-6 (CST)
  - Summer (DST): UTC-5 (CDT)
- Area code: 620
- GNIS feature ID: 475777

Raymond Township is a township in Rice County, Kansas, United States. As of the 2020 census, its population was 169.

== History ==
Raymond Township was established in 1874. It was created from parts of Spencer Township (now Farmer Township) and Sterling Township. Raymond Township eventually had three more townships split from it: Center Township, Valley Township in 1879, and Bell Township in the 1910s.

== Geography ==
Raymond Township covers an area of 35.925 square miles (93.05 square kilometers). The Arkansas River flows through it.

=== Communities ===
- Raymond

=== Adjacent townships ===
Pioneer Township, Rice County
Lakin Township, Barton County	northwest	north	northeast	Lincoln Township, Rice County
Comanche Township, Barton County	west	self	east	Center Township, Rice County
Putnam Township, Stafford County	southwest	south
Bell Township, Rice County

== Transportation ==
=== Major highways ===
- US-56
- K-96
