= Wilson Township, Rice County, Kansas =

Township in Rice County, Kansas, U.S.

Wilson Township
- Township
- Location within Rice County
- Coordinates: 38.302483°N 98.091249°W
- Country: United States
- State: Kansas
- County: Rice

Government
  - District 2 County Commissioner: Clay Thomas

Area
  - Total: 36.162 sq mi (93.66 km^{2})
  - Land: 36.156 sq mi (93.64 km^{2})
  - Water: 0.006 sq mi (0.016 km^{2}) 0.02%

Population (2020)
  - Total: 109
  - Density: 3.01/sq mi (1.16/km^{2})
- Time zone: UTC-6 (CST)
  - Summer (DST): UTC-5 (CDT)
- Area code: 620
- GNIS feature ID: 475795

Wilson Township is a township in Rice County, Kansas, United States. As of the 2020 census, its population was 109.

== History ==
Wilson Township was organized from land formerly in Atlanta Township, Union Township, and Washington Township (now split into West and East Washington Townships).

== Geography ==
Wilson Township covers an area of 36.162 square miles (93.66 square kilometers).

=== Communities ===
- Saxman

=== Adjacent townships ===
Mitchell Township, Rice County
Harrison Township, Rice County	northwest	north	northeast	Union Township, Rice County
Atlanta Township, Rice County	west	self	east	Rockville Township, Rice County
Sterling Township, Rice County	southwest	south
West Washington Township, Rice County
