= Center Township, Rice County, Kansas =

Township in Rice County, Kansas, U.S.

Center Township
- Township
- Location within Rice County
- Coordinates: 38.296955°N 98.321595°W
- Country: United States
- State: Kansas
- County: Rice

Government
  - District 1 County Commissioner: Derek McCloud

Area
  - Total: 36.661 sq mi (94.95 km^{2})
  - Land: 36.648 sq mi (94.92 km^{2})
  - Water: 0.013 sq mi (0.034 km^{2}) 0.04%

Population (2020)
  - Total: 107
  - Density: 2.92/sq mi (1.13/km^{2})
- Time zone: UTC-6 (CST)
  - Summer (DST): UTC-5 (CDT)
- Area code: 620
- GNIS feature ID: 475787

Center Township is a township in Rice County, Kansas, United States. As of the 2020 census, its population was 107.

== History ==
Center Township was originally part of Raymond Township before being separated from it.

== Geography ==
Center Township covers an area of 36.661 square miles (94.95 square kilometers).

=== Adjacent townships ===
Lincoln Township, Rice County
Pioneer Township, Rice County	northwest	north	northeast	Harrison Township, Rice County
Raymond Township, Rice County	west	self	east	Atlanta Township, Rice County
Bell Township, Rice County	southwest	south	southeast	Sterling Township, Rice County
Valley Township, Rice County

== Transportation ==
=== Major highways ===
- US-56
- K-96
