= Hayes Township, McPherson County, Kansas =

Township in McPherson County, Kansas, US

Hayes Township
- Township
- Location within McPherson County
- Coordinates: 38.3041°N 97.8800°W
- Country: United States
- State: Kansas
- County: McPherson

Area
  - Total: 36.196 sq mi (93.75 km^{2})
  - Land: 36.196 sq mi (93.75 km^{2})
  - Water: 0 sq mi (0 km^{2}) 0%

Population (2020)
  - Total: 301
  - Density: 8.32/sq mi (3.21/km^{2})
- Time zone: UTC-6 (CST)
  - Summer (DST): UTC-5 (CDT)
- Area code: 620

Hayes Township is a township in McPherson County, Kansas, United States.

== History ==
Hayes Township was organized in 1876.

== Geography ==
Hayes Township covers an area of 36.196 square miles (93.75 square kilometers).

=== Adjacent townships ===
- Castle Township, McPherson County (north)
- Jackson Township, McPherson County (northeast)
- Groveland Township, McPherson County (east)
- Little Valley Township, McPherson County (south)
- East Washington Township, Rice County (southwest)
- Rockville Township, Rice County (west)
- Union Township, Rice County (northwest)
