= Galt, Kansas =

- Ghost town
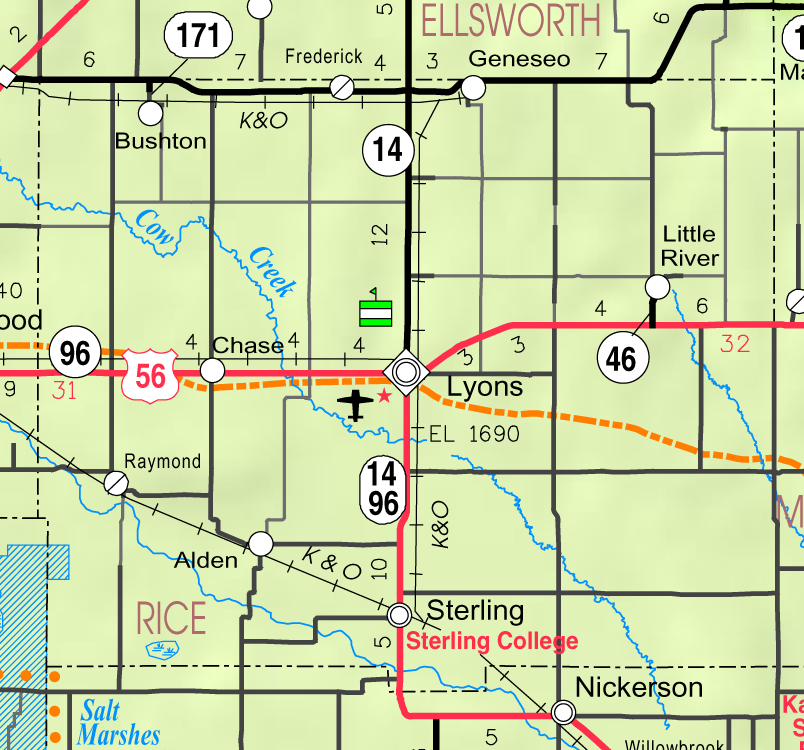
- KDOT map of Rice County (legend)

- Location within Kansas Location within the United States
- Coordinates: 38°27′52″N 98°5′4″W
- Country: United States
- State: Kansas
- County: Rice
- Township: Galt
- Elevation: 1,654 ft (504 m)

Population
  - Total: 0
- Time zone: UTC-6 (CST)
  - Summer (DST): UTC-5 (CDT)
- Area code: 620
- FIPS code: 20-25165
- GNIS ID: 484742

Galt is a ghost town in central Galt Township, Rice County, Kansas, United States. It was located near the Little Arkansas River, 6 miles (9.7 km) southeast of Geneseo and 14 miles (23 km) northeast of Lyons.

== History ==
Circa 1910, Galt contained a general store and 15 inhabitants. It was a shipping point on the Atchison, Topeka, and Santa Fe railroad. The post office in Galt closed in 1911. Currently, no structures remain of this former community.
