= Sterling Township, Rice County, Kansas =

Township in Rice County, Kansas, U.S.

Sterling Township
- Township
- Location within Rice County
- Coordinates: 38.210°N 98.174°W
- Country: United States
- State: Kansas
- County: Rice
- Established: 1871

Government
  - District 2 County Commissioner: Clay Thomas

Area
  - Total: 44.003 sq mi (113.97 km^{2})
  - Land: 43.527 sq mi (112.73 km^{2})
  - Water: 0.476 sq mi (1.23 km^{2}) 1.08%

Population (2020)
  - Total: 201
  - Density: 4.62/sq mi (1.78/km^{2})
- Time zone: UTC-6 (CST)
  - Summer (DST): UTC-5 (CDT)
- Area code: 620
- GNIS feature ID: 475784

Sterling Township is a township in Rice County, Kansas, United States. As of the 2020 census, its population was 201.

== History ==
Sterling Township was established in 1871. In 1872 a part of the township was transferred to Reno County. In 1874 parts of Sterling Township were made into Raymond Township and Washington Township (now split into West and East Washington Townships. Later, a part of Sterling Township was made part of Atlanta Township.

== Geography ==
Sterling Township covers an area of 44.003 square miles (113.97 square kilometers). The Arkansas River flows through it. The city of Sterling is completely surrounded by the township but is governmentally independent from it.

=== Adjacent townships ===
Atlanta Township, Rice County
Center Township, Rice County	northwest	north	northeast	Wilson Township, Rice County
Valley Township, Rice County	west	self	east	West Washington Township, Rice County
Walnut Township, Reno County	southwest	south	southeast	Grant Township, Reno County; Salt Creek Township, Reno County
Medford Township, Reno County

== Transportation ==
=== Major highways ===
- K-14
- K-96
