= Rockville Township, Kansas =

Township in Rice County, Kansas, U.S.

Rockville Township
- Township
- Location within Rice County
- Coordinates: 38.301411°N 97.972164°W
- Country: United States
- State: Kansas
- County: Rice

Government
  - District 3 County Commissioner: Terry David

Area
  - Total: 36.172 sq mi (93.69 km^{2})
  - Land: 36.158 sq mi (93.65 km^{2})
  - Water: 0.014 sq mi (0.036 km^{2}) 0.04%

Population (2020)
  - Total: 112
  - Density: 3.10/sq mi (1.20/km^{2})
- Time zone: UTC-6 (CST)
  - Summer (DST): UTC-5 (CDT)
- Area code: 620
- GNIS feature ID: 475813

Rockville Township is a township in Rice County, Kansas, United States. As of the 2020 census, its population was 112.

== History ==
Rockville Township was created from parts of Washington Township (later split into East and West Washington Townships) and Union Township.

== Geography ==
Rockville Township covers an area of 36.172 square miles (93.69 square kilometers).

=== Adjacent townships ===
Union Township, Rice County
Mitchell Township, Rice County	northwest	north	northeast	Castle Township, McPherson County
Wilson Township, Rice County	west	self	east	Hayes Township, McPherson County
West Washington Township, Rice County	southwest	south
East Washington Township, Rice County
