= Valley Township, Rice County, Kansas =

Township in Rice County, Kansas, U.S.

Valley Township
- Township
- Location within Rice County
- Coordinates: 38.217°N 98.316°W
- Country: United States
- State: Kansas
- County: Rice
- Established: 1879

Government
  - District 2 County Commissioner: Clay Thomas

Area
  - Total: 29.877 sq mi (77.38 km^{2})
  - Land: 29.544 sq mi (76.52 km^{2})
  - Water: 0.333 sq mi (0.86 km^{2}) 1.11%

Population (2020)
  - Total: 208
  - Density: 7.04/sq mi (2.72/km^{2})
- Time zone: UTC-6 (CST)
  - Summer (DST): UTC-5 (CDT)
- Area code: 620
- GNIS feature ID: 475785

Valley Township is a township in Rice County, Kansas, United States. As of the 2020 census, its population was 208.

== History ==
Valley Township was established in 1879. It was separated from Raymond Township.

== Geography ==
Valley Township covers an area of 29.877 square miles (77.38 square kilometers). The Arkansas River flows through it.

=== Communities ===
- Alden

=== Adjacent townships ===
Center Township, Rice County
		north
Bell Township, Rice County	west	self	east	Sterling Township, Rice County
Hayes Township, Reno County	southwest	south
Walnut Township, Reno County
