= Silica, Kansas =

Unincorporated community in Rice County, Kansas

- Unincorporated community
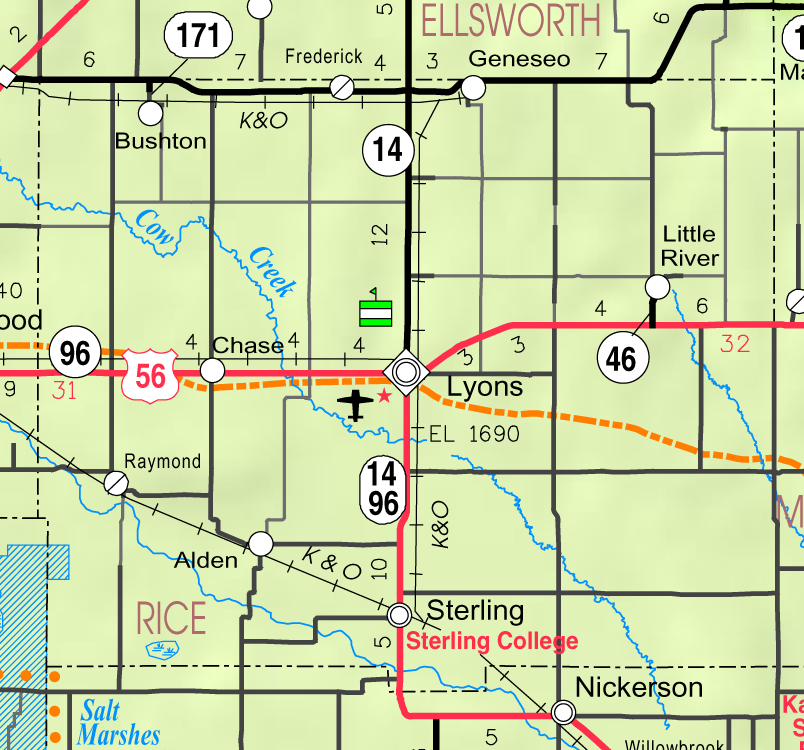
- KDOT map of Rice County (legend)

- Location within Kansas Location within the United States
- Coordinates: 38°21′06″N 98°27′43″W
- Country: United States
- State: Kansas
- County: Rice
- Township: Pioneer
- Elevation: 1,791 ft (546 m)
- Time zone: UTC-6 (CST)
  - Summer (DST): UTC-5 (CDT)
- Area code: 620
- FIPS code: 20-65475
- GNIS ID: 484747

Silica is an unincorporated community in southwestern Pioneer Township, Rice County, Kansas, United States. It lies along local roads a fraction of a mile (about 500 m) north of U.S. Route 56/K-96, 6 miles (9.7 km) east of Ellinwood and 14 miles (23 km) west of Lyons.

== History ==
For millennia, the land now known as Kansas was inhabited by Native Americans. In 1803, most of modern Kansas was secured by the United States as part of the Louisiana Purchase. In 1854, the Kansas Territory was organized, then in 1861 Kansas became the 34th U.S. state. In 1867, Rice County was founded.

Silica had a post office from 1893 until 1953.

== Education ==
The community is served by Chase–Raymond USD 401 public school district.
