= Grant Township, Reno County, Kansas =

Township in Reno County, Kansas, U.S.

Grant Township
- Township
- Location within Reno County
- Coordinates: 38.138808°N 98.02184°W
- Country: United States
- State: Kansas
- County: Reno
- Established: 1872

Government
  - District 1 County Commissioner: Randy Parks

Area
  - Total: 44.735 sq mi (115.86 km^{2})
  - Land: 44.336 sq mi (114.83 km^{2})
  - Water: 0.399 sq mi (1.03 km^{2}) 0.89%

Population (2020)
  - Total: 1,307
  - Density: 29.48/sq mi (11.38/km^{2})
- Time zone: UTC-6 (CST)
  - Summer (DST): UTC-5 (CDT)
- Area code: 620
- GNIS feature ID: 475902

Grant Township is a township in Reno County, Kansas, United States. As of the 2020 census, its population was 1,307.

== History ==
The first township in Reno County was Reno Township, which covered the whole county upon its creation in 1872. Later in the year, Grant Township was formed by splitting off from Reno Township and parts of Rice County.

== Geography ==
Grant Township covers an area of 44.735 square miles (115.86 square kilometers). The Arkansas River flows through it. The city of Nickerson is completely surrounded by the township but is governmentally independent of it.

=== Communities ===
- The Highlands
- Willowbrook
- Yaggy

=== Adjacent townships ===
West Washington Township, Rice County; East Washington Township, Rice County
Sterling Township, Rice County	northwest	north	northeast	Little Valley, McPherson County
Medford Township, Reno County	west	self	east	Medora Township, Reno County
Salt Creek Township, Reno County	southwest		southeast	Reno Township, Reno County

== Transportation ==
=== Major highways ===
- K-14
- K-96
