= David Alvey =

Mayor of Kansas City, Kansas

29th Mayor of Kansas City, Kansas
- In office January 8, 2018 – December 13, 2021
- Preceded by: Mark Holland
- Succeeded by: Tyrone Garner

Personal details
- Born: Wyandotte County, Kansas, U.S
- Spouse: Ann Marie
- Children: 5
- Education: St. Louis University

David Alvey is an American politician who served as the mayor/CEO of the United Government of Wyandotte County and Kansas City, Kansas from 2018 to 2021. He was elected on November 7, 2017, when he defeated incumbent Mark Holland. He took office on January 8, 2018.

Alvey lost re-election to Tyrone Garner on November 2, 2021.
