= Pioneer Township, Rice County, Kansas =

Township in Rice County, Kansas, U.S.

Pioneer Township
- Township
- Location within Rice County
- Coordinates: 38.38°N 98.40°W
- Country: United States
- State: Kansas
- County: Rice
- Established: 1879

Government
  - District 1 County Commissioner: Derek McCloud

Area
  - Total: 36.184 sq mi (93.72 km^{2})
  - Land: 36.172 sq mi (93.69 km^{2})
  - Water: 0.012 sq mi (0.031 km^{2}) 0.03%

Population (2020)
  - Total: 84
  - Density: 2.3/sq mi (0.90/km^{2})
- Time zone: UTC-6 (CST)
  - Summer (DST): UTC-5 (CDT)
- Area code: 620
- GNIS feature ID: 475658

Pioneer Township is a township in Rice County, Kansas, United States. As of the 2020 census, its population was 84.

== History ==
Pioneer Township was established in 1879. It was split off from Farmer Township.

== Geography ==
Pioneer Township covers an area of 36.184 square miles (93.72 square kilometers).

=== Communities ===
- Silica

=== Adjacent townships ===
Farmer Township, Rice County
Logan Township, Barton County	northwest	north	northeast	Eureka Township, Rice County
Lakin Township, Barton County	west	self	east	Lincoln Township, Rice County
		south	southeast	Center Township, Rice County
Raymond Township, Rice County

== Transportation ==
=== Major highways ===
- US-56
- K-96
