= Bill Reardon =

American politician

Member of the Kansas House of Representatives from the 37th district
- In office January 13, 1975 – 2004
- Preceded by: Leland Speer
- Succeeded by: Kathleen Reardon

Personal details
- Born: June 24, 1941 (age 85) Kansas City, Kansas, U.S.
- Party: Democratic
- Spouse: Kathleen T. Page (m. 1963)
- Education: Rockhurst University; University of Missouri–Kansas City

William J. Reardon (born June 24, 1941) is an American politician and educator. He served in the Kansas House of Representatives from 1975 to 2004, when he was replaced in the house by his wife, Kathy.

He was born in, and is a lifelong resident of, Kansas City, Kansas. After attending Bishop Ward High School, he received a BA from Rockhurst College (now Rockhurst University) in 1963. He began teaching government and social studies at Bishop Miege High School in nearby Roeland Park and became the girls assistant basketball coach. He taught at the same school for the next 40 years. He earned his master's degree from University of Missouri–Kansas City.

In 1974 he won the Democratic Party primary and then the general election. Reardon served 15 consecutive terms in the House, only the second state legislator to do so in the history of Kansas. An advocate for education, fair labor practices, social services, and opposition to capital punishment. Reardon and his wife Kathy have been married since 1963, and have three daughters. He works as a lobbyist for the Kansas City Kansas School District.

Reardon was the brother of former Kansas City, Kansas mayor, Jack Reardon.
