= Carol Marinovich =

Mayor of Kansas City, Kansas (1995-2005)

26th Mayor of Kansas City, Kansas
- In office 1995–2005
- Preceded by: Joe Steineger Jr.
- Succeeded by: Joe Reardon

Member of the City Council of Kansas City, Kansas
- In office 1989–1994

Personal details
- Born: Carol Marinovich
- Education: University of Saint Mary (BA); University of Kansas (MA)

Carol Marinovich is an American politician in Kansas. She was the first woman to sit on the city council of Kansas City, Kansas when she was elected in 1989. She was then the first woman elected as Mayor of Kansas City, Kansas in 1995.

== Personal life ==
Carol Marinovich graduated from the University of Kansas in 1982 with a master’s degree in education.

== City council ==
Marinovich was elected to the city council of Kansas City, Kansas in 1989, the first woman chosen for the position.

During her time as a councilwoman, she focused on cracking down on the city's adult entertainment establishments, discouraged the conversion of historic homes, and found a developer for the housing complex, Palo Vista.

== Mayor of Kansas City, Kansas ==
Marinovich was elected as Mayor of Kansas City in 1995, during a time of decline in the city.

In 1997, voters approved a proposition to unify the city and county governments, creating a consolidated city-county known as the "United Government." In unifying the governments, Marinovich became Mayor/CEO of Wyandotte County and Kansas City, Kansas.

Much of her effort involved the creation and development of the area's tourism district, Village West, including her involvement in the development of the Kansas Speedway.

In 2005, Marinovich received the 2005 Outstanding Kansas Citizen award. Please update or delete.

In 2005, Marinovich received the 2005 "Outstanding Kansas Citian" Award from the Native Sons and Daughters of Greater Kansas City.

== Post-mayoral life ==
Marinovich continues to be actively engaged in her community.
