= Raymond, Kansas =

City in Rice County, Kansas

- City
- Location within Rice County and Kansas

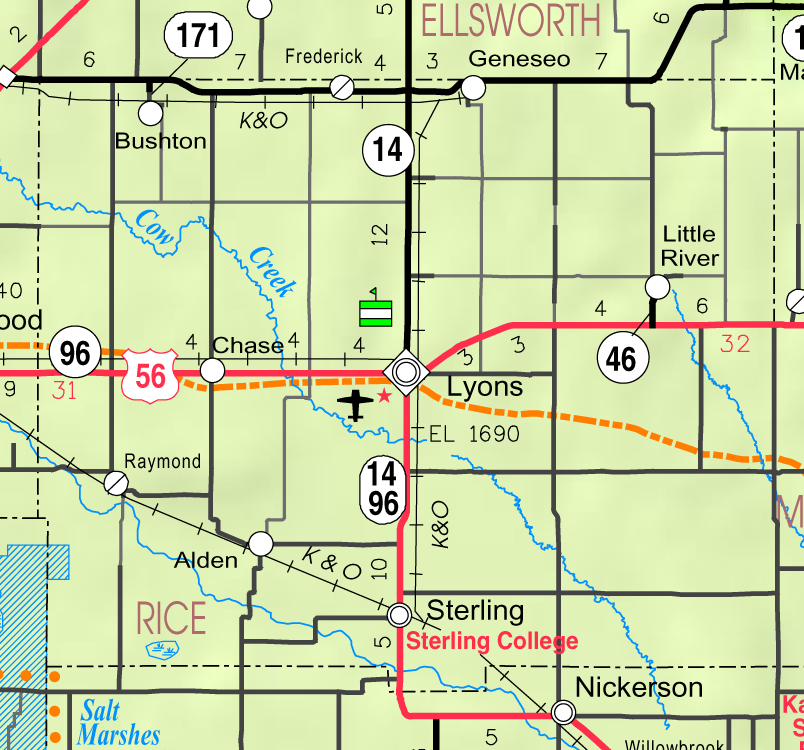
- KDOT map of Rice County (legend)
- Coordinates: 38°16′41″N 98°24′52″W
- Country: United States
- State: Kansas
- County: Rice
- Township: Raymond
- Founded: 1871
- Incorporated: 1954
- Named for: Emmons Raymond

Area
  - Total: 0.31 sq mi (0.80 km^{2})
  - Land: 0.31 sq mi (0.80 km^{2})
  - Water: 0 sq mi (0.00 km^{2})
- Elevation: 1,726 ft (526 m)

Population (2020)
  - Total: 85
  - Density: 280/sq mi (110/km^{2})
- Time zone: UTC-6 (CST)
  - Summer (DST): UTC-5 (CDT)
- ZIP Code: 67573
- Area code: 620
- FIPS code: 20-58550
- GNIS ID: 2396327

Raymond is a city in Rice County, Kansas, United States. It is named after Emmons Raymond, former Director of the Atchison, Topeka and Santa Fe Railway. As of the 2020 census, the population of the city was 85.

== History ==
For millennia, the land now known as Kansas was inhabited by Native Americans. In 1803, most of modern Kansas was secured by the United States as part of the Louisiana Purchase. In 1854, the Kansas Territory was organized, then in 1861 Kansas became the 34th U.S. state. In 1867, Rice County was founded.

Raymond was founded in 1871, making it the oldest town in Rice County. The first post office in Raymond was established in 1872. At one point in its history Raymond was known as a wild "cowtown" and was a stop on the Santa Fe Railroad, but the town has been in decline since the 1950s.

== Geography ==
According to the United States Census Bureau, the city has a total area of 0.32 square miles (0.83 km^{2}), all land.

== Demographics ==
Historical population
Census	Pop.	Note	%±
1880	87		—
1890	137		57.5%
1960	143		—
1970	133		−7.0%
1980	132		−0.8%
1990	125		−5.3%
2000	95		−24.0%
2010	79		−16.8%
2020	85		7.6%
U.S. Decennial Census

=== 2020 census ===
The 2020 United States census counted 85 people, 42 households, and 27 families in Raymond. The population density was 274.2 per square mile (105.9/km^{2}). There were 43 housing units at an average density of 138.7 per square mile (53.6/km^{2}). The racial makeup was 87.06% (74) white or European American (87.06% non-Hispanic white), 0.0% (0) black or African-American, 0.0% (0) Native American or Alaska Native, 2.35% (2) Asian, 0.0% (0) Pacific Islander or Native Hawaiian, 1.18% (1) from other races, and 9.41% (8) from two or more races. Hispanic or Latino of any race was 4.71% (4) of the population.

Of the 42 households, 26.2% had children under the age of 18; 45.2% were married couples living together; 23.8% had a female householder with no spouse or partner present. 19.0% of households consisted of individuals and 11.9% had someone living alone who was 65 years of age or older. The average household size was 1.8 and the average family size was 2.2. The percent of those with a bachelor's degree or higher was estimated to be 3.5% of the population.

17.6% of the population was under the age of 18, 4.7% from 18 to 24, 22.4% from 25 to 44, 32.9% from 45 to 64, and 22.4% who were 65 years of age or older. The median age was 48.5 years. For every 100 females, there were 77.1 males. For every 100 females ages 18 and older, there were 94.4 males.

The 2016–2020 5-year American Community Survey estimates show that the median household income was $45,000 (with a margin of error of +/- $23,960) and the median family income was $50,417 (+/- $25,190). Females had a median income of $21,667 (+/- $14,587). The median income for those above 16 years old was $22,250 (+/- $17,987). Approximately, 15.8% of families and 29.9% of the population were below the poverty line, including 100.0% of those under the age of 18 and 0.0% of those ages 65 or over.

=== 2010 census ===
As of the census of 2010, there were 79 people, 39 households, and 20 families residing in the city. The population density was 246.9 inhabitants per square mile (95.3/km^{2}). There were 51 housing units at an average density of 159.4 per square mile (61.5/km^{2}). The racial makeup of the city was 100.0% White.

There were 39 households, of which 15.4% had children under the age of 18 living with them, 48.7% were married couples living together, 2.6% had a male householder with no wife present, and 48.7% were non-families. 38.5% of all households were made up of individuals, and 18% had someone living alone who was 65 years of age or older. The average household size was 2.03 and the average family size was 2.75.

The median age in the city was 52.4 years. 12.7% of residents were under the age of 18; 10.1% were between the ages of 18 and 24; 15.2% were from 25 to 44; 35.4% were from 45 to 64; and 26.6% were 65 years of age or older. The gender makeup of the city was 51.9% male and 48.1% female.

== Area events ==
- Labor Day Parade, has been held in Raymond since 1997.

== Education ==
The community is served by Chase–Raymond USD 401 public school district.

== See also ==
- Quivira National Wildlife Refuge
