= Saxman, Kansas =

Unincorporated community in Rice County, Kansas

- Unincorporated community
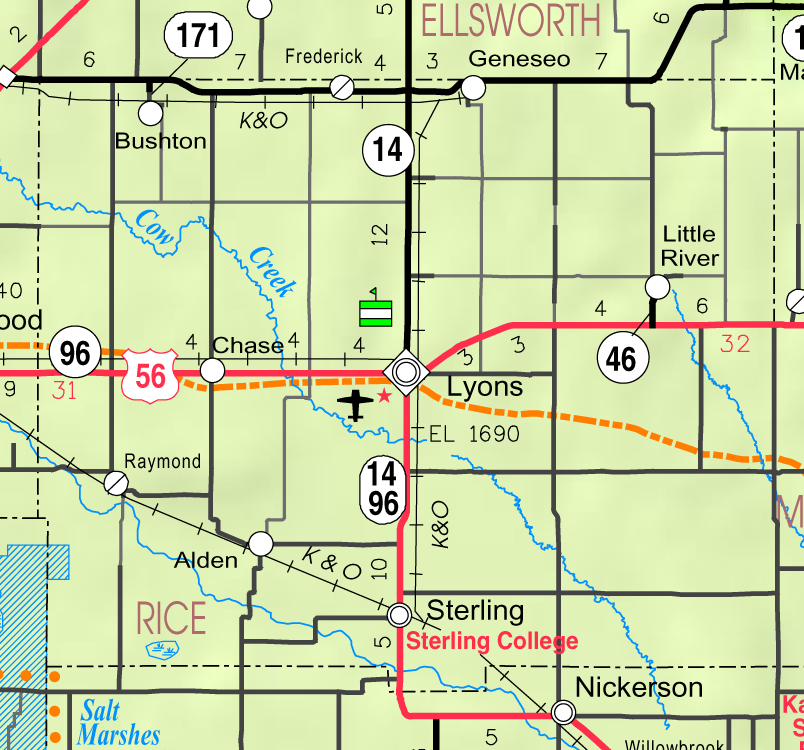
- KDOT map of Rice County (legend)

- Location within Kansas Location within the United States
- Coordinates: 38°16′50″N 98°07′27″W
- Country: United States
- State: Kansas
- County: Rice
- Township: Wilson
- Elevation: 1,631 ft (497 m)
- Time zone: UTC-6 (CST)
  - Summer (DST): UTC-5 (CDT)
- ZIP Code: 66861
- Area code: 620
- FIPS code: 20-63300
- GNIS ID: 475806

Saxman is an unincorporated community in Rice County, Kansas, United States. Located along Cow Creek just above its confluence with Jarvis Creek, it lies along local roads southeast of Lyons.

== History ==
For millennia, the land now known as Kansas was inhabited by Native Americans. In 1803, most of modern Kansas was secured by the United States as part of the Louisiana Purchase. In 1854, the Kansas Territory was organized, then in 1861 Kansas became the 34th U.S. state. In 1867, Rice County was founded.

A post office was opened in Saxman in 1891, and remained in operation until it was discontinued in 1952.

In May 2007, Saxman was severely affected by flooding from Cow Creek. The flooding washed away roads and farms and damaged many of the community's residences. Several of the community's residents were forced to evacuate.

== Education ==
The community is served by Sterling USD 376 public school district.

== See also ==
- National Register of Historic Places listings in Rice County, Kansas
