= Jarvis Creek =

Stream in Rice County, Kansas, U.S.

Coordinates: 38.268344°N 98.115891°W

Jarvis Creek is a stream in Rice County, Kansas, in the United States.

According to tradition, Jarvis Creek was named for a man who was robbed and murdered near the creek by his travel companions in 1846.

== See also ==
- List of rivers of Kansas
