= Mitchell Township, Rice County, Kansas =

Township in Rice County, Kansas, U.S.

Mitchell Township
- Township
- Location within Rice County
- Coordinates: 38.398397°N 98.099707°W
- Country: United States
- State: Kansas
- County: Rice

Government
  - District 3 County Commissioner: Terry David

Area
  - Total: 36.397 sq mi (94.27 km^{2})
  - Land: 36.333 sq mi (94.10 km^{2})
  - Water: 0.064 sq mi (0.17 km^{2}) 0.18%

Population (2020)
  - Total: 118
  - Density: 3.25/sq mi (1.25/km^{2})
- Time zone: UTC-6 (CST)
  - Summer (DST): UTC-5 (CDT)
- Area code: 620
- GNIS feature ID: 475675

Mitchell Township is a township in Rice County, Kansas, United States. As of the 2020 census, its population was 118.

== History ==
Mitchell Township was created from parts of Victoria Township, Union Township, and Atlanta Township.

== Geography ==
Mitchell Township covers an area of 36.397 square miles (94.27 square kilometers).

=== Communities ===
- Mitchell

=== Adjacent townships ===
Galt Township, Rice County
| Victoria Township, Rice County | northwest | north | northeast | Odessa Township, Rice County |
| Harrison Township, Rice County | west | self | east | Union Township, Rice County |
| Atlanta Township, Rice County | southwest | south | southeast | Rockville Township, Rice County |
Wilson Township, Rice County

== Transportation ==
=== Major highways ===
- US-56
