= Tyrone Garner (politician) =

American politician (born 1960s)

30th Mayor of Kansas City, Kansas
- In office December 13, 2021 – December 14, 2025
- Preceded by: David Alvey
- Succeeded by: Christal Watson

Personal details
- Born: 1968 or 1969 (age 56–57) Portland, Maine, U.S.
- Party: Independent-Unaffiliated Party (United States)
- Children: 1
- Education: MidAmerica Nazarene University (BA); Ottawa University (MA)

Military service
- Allegiance: United States
- Branch/service: United States Army

Tyrone A. Garner (born 1968 or 1969) is an American politician and retired police officer who served as the 30th mayor of Kansas City, Kansas, from 2021 to 2025. He previously served as the deputy chief of the Kansas City Police Department (KCKPD).

== Early life and education ==
Garner was born in 1968 or 1969, in Portland, Maine. He grew up in San Jose, California, before he and his family moved to Kansas City, Kansas, at the beginning of his freshman year in high school. He graduated from Wyandotte High School in 1987 and enlisted in the United States Army. Garner earned a bachelor's degree from MidAmerica Nazarene University and a master's degree from Ottawa University.

== Career ==
After being honorably discharged from the Army, Garner joined the Kansas City Police Department, where he would serve for over three decades, attaining the ranks of Detective, Captain, Major, and ultimately Deputy Chief. Garner was the first and only African American Kansas City police officer to attend and graduate from the FBI National Academy in Quantico, Virginia. He served on the Kansas City Kansas Community Collegeboard of trustees leading the finance committee. Garner served as a governor-appointed Kansas African American Affairs commissioner for the Kansas's 3rd congressional district.

Garner retired from the Kansas City Kansas Police Department in June 2019, and in August 2019 was appointed the Director of Public Safety for the Housing Authority of Kansas City Missouri, where he served until his decision to run for the position of Mayor CEO of the Unified Government of Wyandotte County Kansas City Kansas.

On November 2, 2021, Garner defeated incumbent David Alvey in a close election to become the first African-American mayor of Kansas City, Kansas.[6] He took office on December 13, 2021.

=== Mayoral tenure ===
On January 10, 2022, Garner hired Wyandotte County's first black female interim county administrator, Cheryl Harrison-Lee. Four months later, on April 21, 2022, county commissioners raised questions about Harrison-Lee's dedication to the job, citing her ongoing consultancy work with the neighboring city of Kansas City, Missouri, administering economic development tax revenues. Garner was alleged to have “angrily stormed out of a special session" of the unified government on May 3, 2022, refusing to answer commissioners' requests that he begin a nationwide search for a permanent county administrator. Commissioners cited the interim administrators' possible conflict of interest as reasons to begin the search.

Garner later noted to sources that the Commissioners request was a flagrant violation of the Unified Government's charter which prohibits Commissioners from weighing in on personnel matters delegated to the Mayor. Garner noted that having a public meeting openly discussing personnel matters was inappropriate, comprised the County Administrators right to privacy, inappropriately disregarded his executive privileges, and potentially opened exposure to legal action, therefore he abruptly closed the public meeting, and later scheduled a closed executive meeting with Commissioners to address their concerns.

Garner later lead the first ever collaborative, inclusive, and transparent national search for a permanent County Administrator, involving a citizen advisory board selected by Commissioners, which recommended three finalists that met with the public prior to Garner announcing his appointment recommendation of David Johnston to Commissioners for their consent approval.

Garner modified the incoming County Administrators contract to better reflect improved accountability and controlled benefit package outcomes.

In 2022 Garner requested that the County Administrator initiate an outside, independent, unaffiliated, professional soft financial-organizational audit assessment of the Unified Government. The Administrator selected a highly respected consulting firm out of Atlanta Georgia-Washington DC to initiate a series of actual performance-forensic audits completely separate from the general compliance audits performed by the current employee auditor. What was revealed in their July 2022 report provided to the commission was disturbing findings that insinuated allegations of potential mismanagement, excessive UG employee purchasing card spending, that shed light on a previously undisclosed, serious organizational financial crisis projected to occur as early as 2026.

Garner extremely outspoken, regularly advocated for improvements in government efficiency, management, property tax mitigation, enhanced bureaucratic accountability, a full-fledged independent forensic/performance audit of the entire local government, customer service, scaling back huge corporate welfare economic development incentives, improved community engagement, increased organizational transparency, fiscal responsibility, and investment in historically disenfranchised disinvested redlined areas in the eastern parts of Kansas City Kansas, culminating in his solidarity with two other Wyandotte County Mayors to spearhead discussions on how to improve a unified government that a growing number of residents regularly acknowledged dissatisfaction with the Unified Government.

The commission was well known for clashing with Garner over his challenges to the status quo, taking an unprecedented move to curtail some of the Mayor's executive privileges, that Garner insisted was a “Shady” way to do business especially with Garner consistently calling for collaboration and cooperation with the Commission throughout his tenure.

As a result of the auditor's findings, early on in his tenure Garner made securing the integrity of the financial solvency of the organization one of his top priorities, openly notifying the public on the impending financial crisis.

Working with a newly appointed Administrator and CFO, budget Director, embracing responsible fiscal solutions, administrative policy changes, and budget recommendations adopted out of necessity by a majority of Commissioners, successfully stabilized the short-term financial position of the organization by responsibly targeting debt, integrating fiscally responsible best practices, minimizing borrowing, and balancing the short term budget prospective by curtailing unnecessary non-essential UG spending.

These emergency reforms pushed the impending budget dilemma out beyond 2028, which provided staff leadership breathing room to work with the governing body on finding long-term solutions to address financial challenges, that Garner did not create, but rather inherited from past elected leadership decisions.

It cannot be disputed, that along with numerous major economic developments projects materializing during his tenure, the fiscal stabilization of the governments financials was also one of Garners noteworthy achievements early on in his tenure as Mayor.

Mayor Garner was well known as “The People’s Mayor” for his community engagement and outreach, he had a citizens task force where people could suggest policy changes. This allowed citizens to talk directly with policymakers. He also allowed unrestricted access to his office for constituents to meet with him in person.

In a Facebook post on January 29, 2024, Garner announced he would temporarily step aside as mayor to undergo a medical procedure. Tom Burroughs, former Democraticmember of the Kansas House of Representatives and current Unified Government At-Large District 2 Commissioner served as Mayor Pro Tempore during the recovery period and Garner returned to office on April 15, 2024.

On November 19, 2024, Garner's office released a statement saying he would not seek re-election after his current term. Garner facilitated a graceful transition of leadership to incoming Mayor, Crystal Watson, with his tenure officially concluding on December 14, 2025.

== Controversies ==
On December 16, 2021, steaming from pockets of constituents recommendations, Garner facilitated Commissioners debate on ending the county's mask mandate early, against the appeal of county health officials. The repeal was ultimately approved by a majority of Commissioners.

On December 27, 2021, an unsubstantiated allegation from an editorial piece accused Garner of closing the county's sole cold-weather shelter. Garner later strongly denied the allegations, noting that as a Mayor he was compelled to inquire with the operator to ensure neighborhood input, health, safety, adequate accommodations, and wrap around services had been adequately established. Garner called an emergency commissioners meeting, to have those questions answered by the operator, the shelter was never halted, and opened without incident .

On January 18, 2022, KCTV broke the story that Garner was assigned a brand new $85,569 GMC Yukon Denali for official use. After widespread community debate, Garner returned the luxury SUV to the city's fleet center on February 8, 2022, vowing to never accept a new vehicle assignment from the city for his official use as Mayor. The vehicle was ultimately sold by the city for a profit, with the city actually making more from the sale of the vehicle than what was purchased.

In January 2022, Garner fought to revive the counties only convention center located in downtown Kansas City Kansas. Garner initially opposed a $23 million downtown multi family housing project that called for the demolition of the convention center. The proposed development was approved by the previous administration, with several multi year development agreement extensions given to the developer to complete the project. Garner's opposition stemmed from the developers inability to adequately deliver, with the developers latest extension expiring. Garner advocated that the appropriate procurement and bidding procedures be followed, keeping the project new development agreement extension request off the commission agendas reinforcing his lack of confidence in the projects potential to materialize. In April 2023, Garner succumbed to relentless pressure from Commissioners for the ability to debate and discuss the developers request. The Board of Commissioners approved another extension to the developer in a modified project that included direct assistance of $9.5 million in substantial incentives and subsidies to the developer, which Garner did not oppose. Ultimately, the project again failed to materialize when the developer withdrew his proposal due to an inability to meet financial milestones.

== Honors and awards ==
- 2016 KCKPS Reasons to Believe Award Recipient
- 2018 Black Achievers Award presented by the SCLC of Greater Kansas City
- KC Globe Most Influential Kansas Citians of 2015 Award
- Eugene K. Patterson Community Service Award presented by the Heart of America Chapter of The Tuskegee Airmen
- Rosalyn Brown and Betty Taliaferro Service Award presented by Friends of Yates, Inc.

== See also ==
- List of first African-American mayors
