= Jack Reardon (politician) =

American politician (1943–1988)

24th Mayor of Kansas City, Kansas
- In office 1976 – April 1987
- Preceded by: Richard F. Walsh
- Succeeded by: Joe Steineger Jr.

Personal details
- Born: John E. Reardon; August 23, 1943 Kansas City, Kansas, US
- Died: November 25, 1988 (aged 45) Kansas City, Kansas, US
- Party: Democratic
- Relations: Bill Reardon (brother)
- Children: 2, including Joe
- Education: Donnelly College; Rockhurst College

John E. Reardon (August 23, 1943 – November 25, 1988) was an American politician who served as the 24th mayor of Kansas City, Kansas, in the 1970s and 1980s.

== Biography ==
Reardon was born on August 23, 1943, in Kansas City, Kansas. In 1961, he graduated from Bishop Ward High School, then attended Rockhurst and Donnelly College—graduating with an associate degree in 1963. He went on to work as a history teacher for the Kansas City, Kansas Public Schools district and later worked as Wyandotte County's Register of Deeds.

From 1976 to 1987, Reardon served as a Democratic mayor of Kansas City, Kansas, and was the youngest person to do so, being elected at age 31. While incumbent, he negotiated with General Motors to build what became the Fairfax Assembly & Stamping II. In 1984, he ran for the United States House of Representatives, losing to Jan Meyers. He served as mayor until April 1987, when Joe Steineger Jr. succeeded him.

On February 18, 1987, due to cardiomyopathy, a new heart was transplanted to Reardon at the University of Kansas Medical Center, becoming the first mayor in the United States to have a transplanted heart while in office. He said his loss was due to the heart transplant. However, he was still elected to the Wyandotte County Commission in the same election. On November 25, 1988, he returned to the Medical Center with dizziness and shortness of breath. Despite receiving a pacemaker, he died that evening, aged 45. He was buried at Mount Calvary Cemetery, in Kansas City.

Reardon and his wife, Helen (died 2017), had two children, including Joe, who also served as mayor of Kansas City, Kansas, in the 2000s and 2010s. The Jack Reardon Community Center—a municipal building—was named for him. In 2022, it was scheduled to be demolished and its lot used for an apartments and stores, but mayor Tyrone Garner stopped the plans, instead planning revitalization efforts for the building in 2024. His brother is former Kansas House Representative Bill Reardon.
