= John Riordan (banker) =

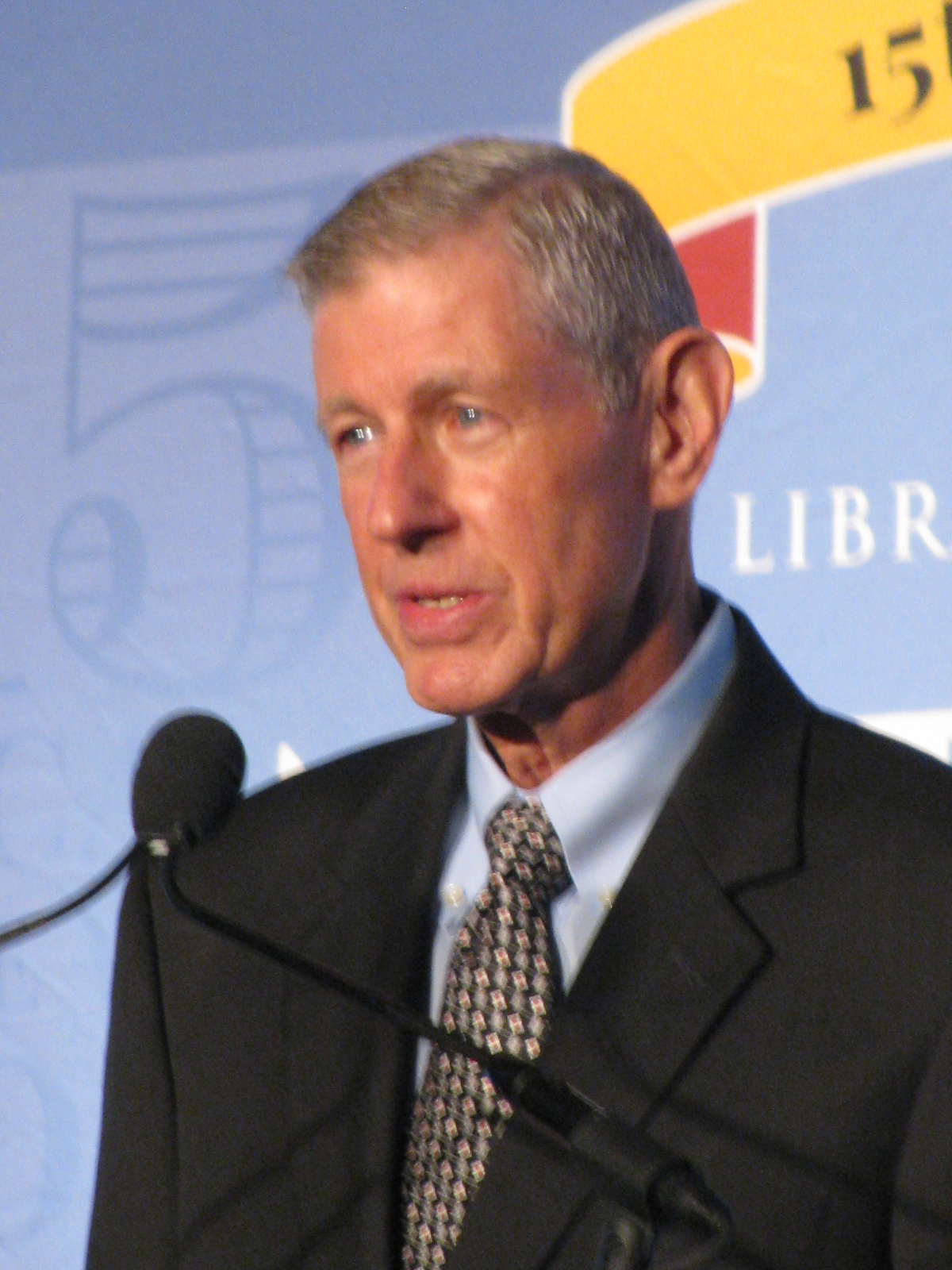
- Occupation: Banker

John Riordan is an American banker credited with saving 105 South Vietnamese lives during the Fall of Saigon. He is known as the "Oskar Schindler of the Vietnam War".

== Actions during the Fall of Saigon ==
In April 1975, Riordan was an Assistant Manager at Citibank in Saigon (modern-day Ho Chi Minh City). He was ordered to evacuate along with other Americans as North Vietnamese Army forces approached the city (then the capital of South Vietnam) during the final days of the Vietnam War. Riordan initially obeyed the evacuation orders and was flown to nearby Hong Kong.

In Hong Kong, Riordan began plotting ways to rescue his South Vietnamese coworkers, who were ineligible for evacuation (because they were not Americans) and who were likely to be executed by the Vietcong (because they were closely affiliated with Americans). He proposed numerous plans to Citibank and the US government but was repeatedly turned down. Eventually, Citibank told him to cease and desist his rescue efforts or be terminated from employment.

On April 19, 1975, Riordan flew back to Saigon alone. He gathered all of his South Vietnamese coworkers and their families (105 people in total) and hid them in his villa and a nearby villa near the city. Facing no other options, Riordan decided to claim the 105 people as his dependents so that they would qualify for evacuation aboard US military cargo planes. He applied at the evacuation office ten separate times, listing several of the 105 as his dependents each time. Riordan himself flew out with the last group a few days before the Fall of Saigon.

== Recognition ==
Citibank, instead of terminating Riordan, praised his efforts and worked to resettle all of the South Vietnamese workers and find them new jobs. Nevertheless, his story was largely unknown until October 2013 when Riordan was profiled on 60 Minutes.

== Personal life ==
Riordan is openly gay.

== Works ==
- They Are All My Family: A Daring Rescue in the Chaos of Saigon's Fall. PublicAffairs. April 7, 2015. pp. 112–. ISBN 978-1-61039-504-5.
