= Mark Holland (American politician) =

American politician and pastor

The Reverend Mark Holland
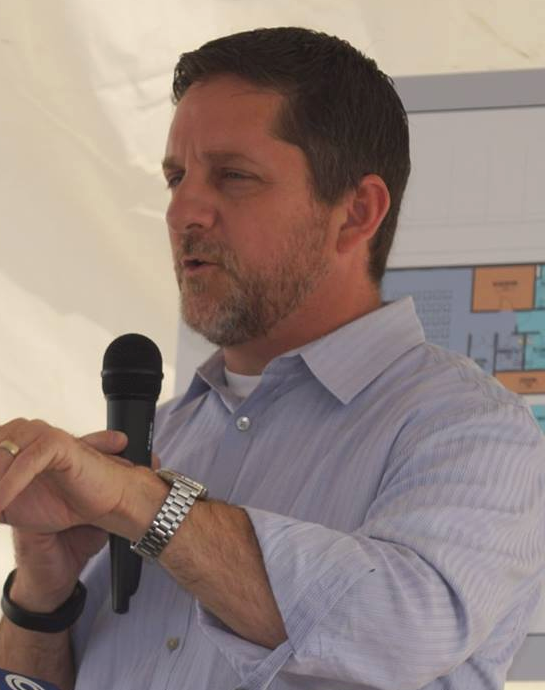

28th Mayor of Kansas City
- In office April 25, 2013 – January 8, 2018
- Preceded by: Joe Reardon
- Succeeded by: David Alvey

Personal details
- Born: Mark Ronald Holland; May 6, 1969 (age 57) Kansas City, Kansas, U.S.
- Party: Democratic
- Children: 4
- Education: Southern Methodist University (BA); Iliff School of Theology (MDiv); Saint Paul School of Theology (DMin)
- Website: Campaign website

Mark Ronald Holland (born May 6, 1969) is an American pastor, politician, and community leader who served as the 28th mayor of Kansas City, Kansas between 2013 and 2018. A Democrat, he was the party's nominee for U.S. Senator from Kansas in the 2022 election, losing to incumbent Republican Senator Jerry Moran in a landslide.

== Early life and education ==
Holland was born on May 6, 1969, in Kansas City, Kansas (KCK). He is the third child and only son of Rev. Dr. Ronald E. Holland, a Methodist minister, and Marci L. Holland, a public school teacher.

After graduating from Shawnee Mission West High School in 1987, he attended Southern Methodist University in Dallas, Texas, where he majored in philosophy and anthropology.

He earned a Master of Divinity degree from Iliff School of Theology and a Doctor of Ministry degree from St. Paul School of Theology, both United Methodist schools.

== Religious work ==
Holland grew up wanting to be a United Methodist pastor. During seminary, he worked as a counselor with youth facing challenges with abuse, neglect, and addiction issues in both intensive outpatient and residential settings.

After ordination, Holland served as a student pastor at Washington Park UMC in Denver, Colorado and then as a pastor in both the Elwood Community Church in Elwood, Kansas, and Wathena United Methodist Church in Wathena, Kansas.

In 1999, Holland became Senior Pastor at Trinity Community Church in Kansas City, Kansas, where he served until 2018.

In July 2018, Holland co-founded Mainstream UMC with Rev. Dr. Nanette Roberts, pastor of Olathe Grace United Methodist Church. The group advocates for the inclusion of the LGBTQ+ community into the church, as well as ordination and marriage. He continues to serve as executive director.

Holland has served as the pastor of Pasadena Community Church in St. Petersburg, Florida since May 2025.

== Public office ==
According to his father, Holland showed an early interest in politics and public service. His first foray into elected office came when he served on the Unified Government Board of Commissioners of Wyandotte County/Kansas City, Kansas, At-Large District 1 seat.

He ran on parks, pools, playgrounds and paths for exercise. The idea was to increase the availability of green space to residents, especially children and families. When "Wyandotte County finished dead last in a 2009 health rankings study" of all counties in Kansas, this plan took on a new level of importance. In 2011, the Board of Commissioners adopted the Complete Streets Resolution. The purpose was to accommodate all road users equally by realizing a balanced road and trail network that safely moves people, not just vehicles.

He left his Commissioner seat to pursue the mayor's office. In 2013, Holland became the 28th Mayor of Kansas City, Kansas and the 3rd Mayor/CEO of the Unified Government.

His administration priorities were "economic development, innovation, and healthy communities."

In his effort to better the health outcomes for KCK residents, Holland lobbied then Governor Brownback to accept Medicaid expansion, as allowed by the Affordable Care Act. Holland called the expansion the single most important thing the state could do to help the uninsured in Wyandotte County and that Brownback's hard stance on work requirements did not consider the employment challenges faced by people with mental health and chronic health conditions.

To improve the downtown KCK area, Holland unveiled The Healthy Campus project as a top initiative for his first term in a State of the Government address in 2014. He hoped for it to be a national model for healthy living in an urban area. The project envisioned bringing quality grocery stores to areas in need of access to better food choices, and offering amenities, such as greenhouses and gardens with edible fruit trees, and facilities, like a community center with Olympic-size pool for youth swim meets, that were accessible to all. In 2018, under the leadership of his successor, the plan was abandoned.

In Holland's first year in office, the Federal Bureau of Labor Statistics announced Wyandotte County created more jobs than most other counties in the metro area, with many of the new jobs coming out of the manufacturing sector. During his tenure, the unemployment rate fell from 7.6% in May 2013 to 4.5% in December 2017.

With the state as a partner, Holland promoted a number of development projects. In July 2016, U.S. Soccer broke ground on a National Training and Coaching Development Center in KCK. A week later, Amazon broke ground on a 855,000-plus-square-foot fulfillment center that would pick, pack, and ship smaller customer items, such as books, electronics and toys. The company planned to employ close to 1000 people.

In 2016, a consultant study, commissioned by Holland, found concerns with the fire department's shift allocation and overtime budget. Efforts to address these findings did not have support among Commissioners or the fire department union.

In 2017, Holland lost re-election to a second term to David Alvey.

== 2022 U.S. Senate campaign ==
On October 1, 2021, Holland announced he would be vying for the Democratic Party nomination for the U.S. Senate seat in Kansas. On August 2, 2022, he won the primary with 41% of the vote.

In the general election, Holland faced incumbent U.S. Senator Jerry Moran. Moran defeated Holland 60% to 37%.

== Personal life ==
Holland has four children.

Political offices
Preceded by Joe Reardon	Mayor of Kansas City; 2013–2018	Succeeded by David Alvey
Party political offices
Preceded by Patrick Wiesner	Democratic nominee for U.S. Senator from Kansas (Class 3); 2022	Most recent
