= Chase–Raymond USD 401 =

Public school district in Chase, Kansas

Address
- 313 E. Ave. C Chase, Kansas, 67524; United States
- Coordinates: 38°21′21″N 98°20′42″W

District information
- Type: Public
- Grades: K to 12

Other information
- Website: usd401.com

Chase–Raymond USD 401 is a public unified school district headquartered in Chase, Kansas, United States. The district includes the communities of Chase, Raymond, Silica, and nearby rural areas.

== Schools ==
The school district operates the following schools:

- Chase High School
- Raymond Junior High
- Chase Grade School

== History ==
Chase High was established near its present location. On May 19, 1910, the voters indicated that a larger school was needed in Chase to replace a smaller one located on the west side of the city. On September 19, 1911, the building opened for a new school year. With the new school, students also gained many activities and new experiences. Football, basketball, and baseball teams were organized for the boys.

Music groups were also formed, and the first annual was published. Up until the 1920s grade school and high school classes had been held in the 1911 building. The new high school was built in 1923 and remains part of the present day school. In 1928, work began on finding a mascot. They chose "Felix the Cat" on October 4, 1928. The name originated from a popular comic character. Felix was a silent movie cartoon in 1914, but he also became a newspaper comic strip in 1923. The district has received legal permission to use this copyrighted character for its mascot.

== See also ==
- Kansas State Department of Education
- Kansas State High School Activities Association
- List of high schools in Kansas
- List of unified school districts in Kansas
