= Sterling USD 376 =

Public school district in Sterling, Kansas

Address
- 308 E. Washington Ave. Sterling, Kansas, 67579; United States
- Coordinates: 38°12′55″N 98°12′11″W

District information
- Type: Public
- Grades: K to 12
- Schools: 3

Other information
- Website: usd376.com

Sterling USD 376 is a public unified school district headquartered in Sterling, Kansas, United States. The district includes the communities of Sterling, Alden, Saxman, and nearby rural areas.

== Schools ==
The school district operates the following schools:

- Sterling High School
- Sterling Junior High School
- Sterling Grade School

== See also ==
- List of unified school districts in Kansas
- List of high schools in Kansas
- Kansas State Department of Education
- Kansas State High School Activities Association
