= Joe Reardon =

American attorney and politician (born 1968)

27th Mayor of Kansas City, Kansas
- In office 2005–2013
- Preceded by: Carol Marinovich
- Succeeded by: Mark Holland

Personal details
- Born: 1968 (age 57–58) Kansas City, Kansas, U.S
- Party: Democratic
- Spouse: Amy
- Relations: Jack Reardon (father)
- Education: Rockhurst University (BS); University of Kansas (JD)
- Profession: Attorney
- Website: reardonreport.com

Joe Reardon (born 1968) is an American attorney who is the former mayor/CEO of the consolidated city-county of Kansas City, Kansas and Wyandotte County. He is a member of the Democratic Party.

== Personal life and education ==
Reardon was born in 1968, to Jack Reardon, who also served as mayor of Kansas City, Kansas. Reardon is a lifelong resident of Kansas City. He has a wife, Amy, and two sons, Jack and Connor. Reardon graduated from Rockhurst University in 1990 with a BS degree in political science. He joined Tau Kappa Epsilon at Rockhurst. Reardon went on to earn a Juris Doctor degree from University of Kansas School of Law in 1994.

== Career ==
After law school, Reardon joined the law firm McAnany, Van Cleave & Phillips from 1994 to 1999 as an Associate Attorney. In 1999, he began working for Thomson Reuters Westlaw, where he stayed until he was elected mayor of Kansas City, Kansas in 2005.

Reardon began the public service portion of his career when he was elected Wyandotte County Commissioner in 2003, representing the second district in the downtown area. Reardon was elected mayor of Kansas City, Kansas after his predecessor, Carol Marinovich, chose not to run for a third term. Reardon helped build Sporting Park, the home of Sporting Kansas City. Reardon also played a role in attracting Google Fiber to the city. Reardon was also credited with helping to attract a casino and a Cerner development. In 2012, Reardon was named Kansas Mayor of the Year.

After his term as mayor ended, Reardon returned to the law firm McAnany, Van Cleave & Phillips. Reardon became President/CEO of the Greater KC Chamber of Commerce in 2016. Reardon serves on the boards of the Kansas Secretary of Commerce’s Start-Up Village Resource Committee, the University of Kansas Medical Center Advancement Board, and the KCI Airport Study Panel. Reardon founded Healthy Communities Wyandotte. He also joined Rockhurst University in August 2013 as an adjunct professor and executive in residence for the Helzberg School of Management.
