= Alden, Kansas =

City in Rice County, Kansas

- City
- Location within Rice County and Kansas

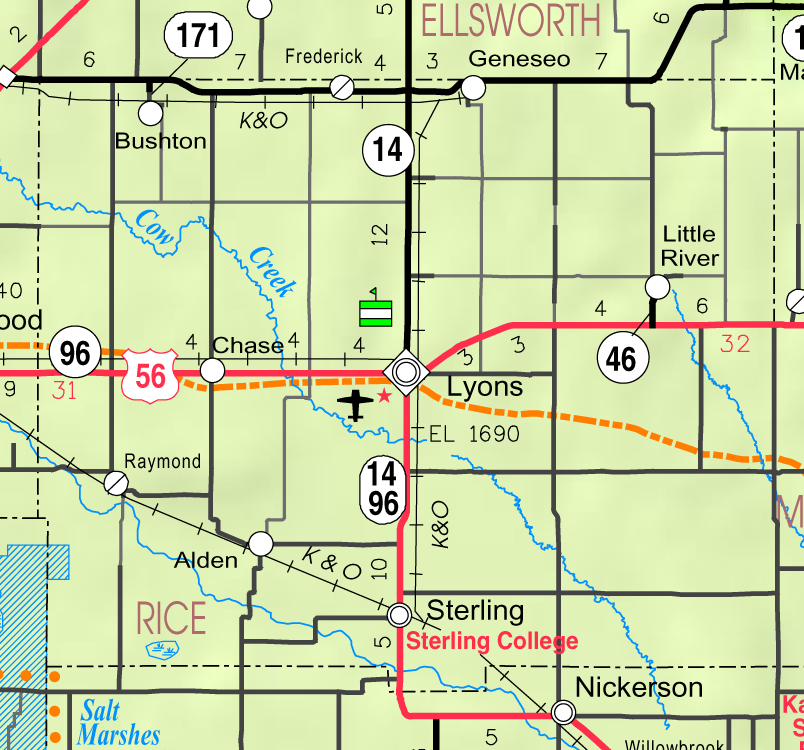
- KDOT map of Rice County (legend)
- Coordinates: 38°14′38″N 98°18′42″W
- Country: United States
- State: Kansas
- County: Rice
- Township: Valley
- Founded: 1872
- Incorporated: 1916
- Named for: Alden Speare

Area
  - Total: 0.15 sq mi (0.40 km^{2})
  - Land: 0.15 sq mi (0.40 km^{2})
  - Water: 0 sq mi (0.00 km^{2})
- Elevation: 1,680 ft (510 m)

Population (2020)
  - Total: 122
  - Density: 790/sq mi (310/km^{2})
- Time zone: UTC-6 (CST)
  - Summer (DST): UTC-5 (CDT)
- ZIP Code: 67512
- Area code: 620
- FIPS code: 20-00950
- GNIS ID: 2393912

Alden is a city in Rice County, Kansas, United States. As of the 2020 census, the population of the city was 122.

== History ==
For millennia, the land now known as Kansas was inhabited by Native Americans. In 1803, most of modern Kansas was secured by the United States as part of the Louisiana Purchase. In 1854, the Kansas Territory was organized, then in 1861 Kansas became the 34th U.S. state. In 1867, Rice County was founded.

Alden was founded in 1872. It was a station on the Atchison, Topeka and Santa Fe Railway. Alden was named for Alden Speare, a railroad employee. The first post office in Alden was established in 1882.

== Geography ==
According to the United States Census Bureau, the city has a total area of 0.19 square miles (0.49 km^{2}), all land.

== Demographics ==
Historical population
Census	Pop.	Note	%±
1920	333		—
1930	286		−14.1%
1940	321		12.2%
1950	286		−10.9%
1960	239		−16.4%
1970	238		−0.4%
1980	214		−10.1%
1990	182		−15.0%
2000	168		−7.7%
2010	148		−11.9%
2020	122		−17.6%
U.S. Decennial Census

=== 2020 census ===
The 2020 United States census counted 122 people, 39 households, and 28 families in Alden. The population density was 787.1 per square mile (303.9/km^{2}). There were 61 housing units at an average density of 393.5 per square mile (151.9/km^{2}). The racial makeup was 94.26% (115) white or European American (94.26% non-Hispanic white), 0.82% (1) black or African-American, 0.82% (1) Native American or Alaska Native, 0.0% (0) Asian, 0.0% (0) Pacific Islander or Native Hawaiian, 0.82% (1) from other races, and 3.28% (4) from two or more races. Hispanic or Latino of any race was 1.64% (2) of the population.

Of the 39 households, 20.5% had children under the age of 18; 59.0% were married couples living together; 20.5% had a female householder with no spouse or partner present. 25.6% of households consisted of individuals and 17.9% had someone living alone who was 65 years of age or older. The average household size was 2.4 and the average family size was 2.7. The percent of those with a bachelor's degree or higher was estimated to be 15.6% of the population.

20.5% of the population was under the age of 18, 4.9% from 18 to 24, 19.7% from 25 to 44, 34.4% from 45 to 64, and 20.5% who were 65 years of age or older. The median age was 48.7 years. For every 100 females, there were 103.3 males. For every 100 females ages 18 and older, there were 90.2 males.

The 2016–2020 5-year American Community Survey estimates show that the median household income was $54,792 (with a margin of error of +/- $7,013) and the median family income was $55,208 (+/- $4,774). Males had a median income of $32,500 (+/- $15,740) versus $38,750 (+/- $25,575) for females. The median income for those above 16 years old was $33,125 (+/- $9,302). Approximately, 11.4% of families and 25.8% of the population were below the poverty line, including 68.8% of those under the age of 18 and 8.3% of those ages 65 or over.

=== 2010 census ===
As of the census of 2010, there were 148 people, 61 households, and 47 families residing in the city. The population density was 778.9 inhabitants per square mile (300.7/km^{2}). There were 80 housing units at an average density of 421.1 per square mile (162.6/km^{2}). The racial makeup of the city was 94.6% White, 0.7% Asian, and 4.7% from two or more races. Hispanic or Latino of any race were 1.4% of the population.

There were 61 households, of which 29.5% had children under the age of 18 living with them, 70.5% were married couples living together, 3.3% had a female householder with no husband present, 3.3% had a male householder with no wife present, and 23.0% were non-families. 21.3% of all households were made up of individuals, and 9.8% had someone living alone who was 65 years of age or older. The average household size was 2.43 and the average family size was 2.79.

The median age in the city was 44 years. 22.3% of residents were under the age of 18; 6.2% were between the ages of 18 and 24; 23.7% were from 25 to 44; 28.4% were from 45 to 64; and 19.6% were 65 years of age or older. The gender makeup of the city was 52.0% male and 48.0% female.

== Education ==
The community is served by Sterling USD 376 public school district. The community was previously served by Alden High School, its mascot was the Tigers.
