= Bell Township, Rice County, Kansas =

Township in Rice County, Kansas, U.S.

Bell Township
- Township
- Location within Rice County
- Coordinates: 38.197864°N 98.401555°W
- Country: United States
- State: Kansas
- County: Rice
- Established: 1910s

Government
  - District 2 County Commissioner: Clay Thomas

Area
  - Total: 36.34 sq mi (94.1 km^{2})
  - Land: 36.145 sq mi (93.62 km^{2})
  - Water: 0.195 sq mi (0.51 km^{2}) 0.54%

Population (2020)
  - Total: 10
  - Density: 0.28/sq mi (0.11/km^{2})
- Time zone: UTC-6 (CST)
  - Summer (DST): UTC-5 (CDT)
- Area code: 620
- GNIS feature ID: 475778

Bell Township is a township in Rice County, Kansas, United States. As of the 2020 census, its population was 10.

== History ==
Bell Township was formed in the 1910s after being split off from Raymond Township.

== Geography ==
Bell Township covers an area of 36.34 square miles (94.1 square kilometers). The Arkansas River flows through it.

=== Adjacent townships ===
Raymond Township, Rice County
		north	northeast	Center Township, Rice County
Putnam Township, Stafford County	west	self	east	Valley Township, Rice County
		south	southeast	Walnut Township, Reno County
Hayes Township, Reno County
