= Atlanta Township, Kansas =

Township in Rice County, Kansas, U.S.

Atlanta Township
- Township
- Location within Rice County
- Coordinates: 38.303°N 98.227°W
- Country: United States
- State: Kansas
- County: Rice
- Established: 1871

Government
  - District 3 County Commissioner: Terry David

Area
  - Total: 34.607 sq mi (89.63 km^{2})
  - Land: 34.536 sq mi (89.45 km^{2})
  - Water: 0.071 sq mi (0.18 km^{2}) 0.21%

Population (2020)
  - Total: 125
  - Density: 3.62/sq mi (1.40/km^{2})
- Time zone: UTC-6 (CST)
  - Summer (DST): UTC-5 (CDT)
- Area code: 620
- GNIS feature ID: 475786

Atlanta Township is a township in Rice County, Kansas, United States. As of the 2020 census, its population was 125.

== History ==
Atlanta Township was established in 1871. What would become Atlanta Township was first settled in October 1870 by Earl Joslin. The township was further divided and Union Township and Washington Township were split off in 1874, and in 1877 Victoria Township was split off as well. Harrison Township, Mitchell Township, and Wilson Township were also later created from territory formerly under Atlanta Township.

== Geography ==
Atlanta Township covers an area of 34.607 square miles (89.36 square kilometers).

=== Adjacent townships ===
Harrison Township, Rice County
Lincoln Township, Rice County	northwest	north	northeast	Mitchell Township, Rice County
Center Township, Rice County	west	self	east	Wilson Township, Rice County
		south
Sterling Township, Rice County

== Transportation ==
=== Major highways ===
- US-56
- K-14
- K-96
