= John P. Reardon =

American administrator (1938–2026)

John Paul Reardon Jr. (February 25, 1938 – June 23, 2026) was an American administrator who was the athletic director at Harvard from 1978 to 1990 and executive director of the Harvard Alumni Association from 1990 to 2014.

== Early life and education ==
Reardon was raised in Cohasset, Massachusetts. His father, John P. Reardon Sr., was a surgeon, and his mother, Rosamond T. Reardon, was a schoolteacher. Reardon graduated from Milton Academy in 1956.

He graduated from Harvard College in 1960. He was student manager of the Harvard Crimson football team during the 1959 season. He earned his Master of Business Administration from the Wharton School of the University of Pennsylvania. In 1963, Reardon joined the Boston Redevelopment Authority as an administrative assistant for operations.

== Career at Harvard ==
In 1965, Reardon accepted a position in the Harvard admissions office. He rose to the position of associate dean of admissions and financial aid for Harvard and Radcliffe Colleges. On September 12, 1977, he was named Harvard's athletic director. He took office the following February. Reardon took over the department during a $30 million athletic construction project that included the construction of the Gordon Track and Tennis Center, renovations to Harvard Stadium, the Bright-Landry Hockey Center, and Dillon Fieldhouse, and the conversion of the Briggs Athletic Center into a basketball arena. He also brought Harvard athletics into compliance with Title IX. During his tenure, the 1988–89 Harvard Crimson men's ice hockey team won the NCAA Division I championship and the Harvard crew won the 1985 Grand Challenge Cup at the Henley Royal Regatta.

In 1988, Reardon took on the additional role of associate vice president for university relations. On May 8, 1989, he announced that he would step down as AD to become the executive director of the Harvard Alumni Association. He remained AD until his successor, Bill Cleary, took over in 1990. He remained head of the Harvard Alumni Association until his retirement in 2014.

== Other work ==
Reardon was also a member of the boards of the Dana–Farber Cancer Institute, Harvard Magazine, and the Harvard Clubs of Boston and New York City, chair of the Cohasset school committee, and a trustee of Thayer Academy and the Roxbury Latin School.

== Later life and death ==
After retiring, Reardon continued to advise the President and Fellows of Harvard College, recruited candidates for the Harvard Board of Overseers, and raised funds for the university. He attended every Board of Overseers meeting until 2025.

Reardon was awarded the Harvard Medal in 2014 and the Milton Medal in 2015. In October 2025, a celebration was held at Loeb House in honor of Reardon's six decades at Harvard.

Reardon died at his home in Weymouth, Massachusetts, on June 23, 2026, at the age of 88.
