= Rice County, Kansas =

County in Kansas, United States

- County
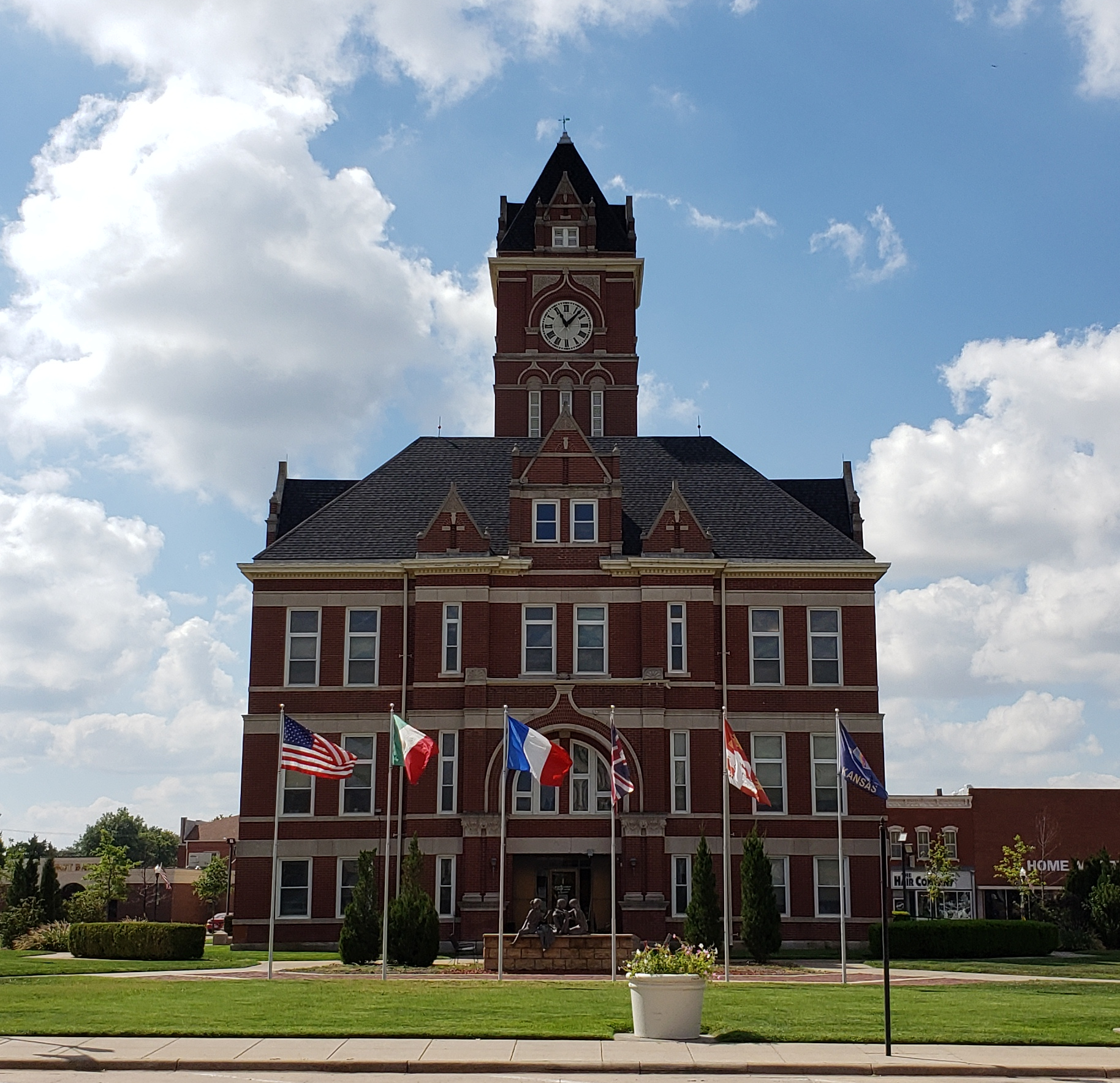
- Rice County Courthouse in Lyons (2022)

- Location within the U.S. state of Kansas
- Coordinates: 38°21′N 98°12′W
- Country: United States
- State: Kansas
- Founded: February 26, 1867
- Named for: Samuel Allen Rice
- Seat: Lyons
- Largest city: Lyons

Area
  - Total: 728 sq mi (1,890 km^{2})
  - Land: 726 sq mi (1,880 km^{2})
  - Water: 1.7 sq mi (4.4 km^{2}) 0.2%

Population (2020)
  - Total: 9,427
  - Estimate (2025): 9,266 ▼
  - Density: 13/sq mi (5.0/km^{2})
- Time zone: UTC−6 (Central)
  - Summer (DST): UTC−5 (CDT)
- Congressional district: 1st
- Website: ricecounty.us

Rice County is a county located in the U.S. state of Kansas. Its county seat and largest city is Lyons. As of the 2020 census, the county population was 9,427. The county was named in memory of Samuel Allen Rice, Brigadier-General, United States volunteers, killed April 30, 1864, at Jenkins Ferry, Arkansas.

== History ==
=== Early history ===
For many millennia, the Great Plains of North America was inhabited by nomadic Native Americans. From the 16th century to 18th century, the Kingdom of France claimed ownership of large parts of North America. In 1762, after the French and Indian War, France secretly ceded New France to Spain, per the Treaty of Fontainebleau.

=== 19th century ===
In 1802, Spain returned most of the land to France, but keeping title to about 7,500 square miles. In 1803, most of the land for modern day Kansas was acquired by the United States from France as part of the 828,000 square mile Louisiana Purchase for 2.83 cents per acre.

In 1854, the Kansas Territory was organized, then in 1861 Kansas became the 34th U.S. state. In 1867, Rice County was established.

The Santa Fe Trail followed the route of present-day U.S. Route 56. Ruts in the earth from the trail are still visible in several locations. (Ralph's Ruts are visible in aerial photos at 38.35959264°N 98.42225502°W.)

In 1878, Atchison, Topeka and Santa Fe Railway and parties from Marion and McPherson counties chartered the Marion and McPherson Railway Company. In 1879, a branch line was built from Florence to McPherson; in 1880 it was extended to Lyons, then in 1881 was extended to Ellinwood. The line was leased and operated by the Atchison, Topeka and Santa Fe Railway. The line from Florence to Marion, was abandoned in 1968. In 1992, the line from Marion to McPherson was sold to Central Kansas Railway. In 1993, after heavy flood damage, the line from Marion to McPherson was abandoned. The original branch line connected Florence, Marion, Canada, Hillsboro, Lehigh, Canton, Galva, McPherson, Conway, Windom, Little River, Mitchell, Lyons, Chase and Ellinwood.

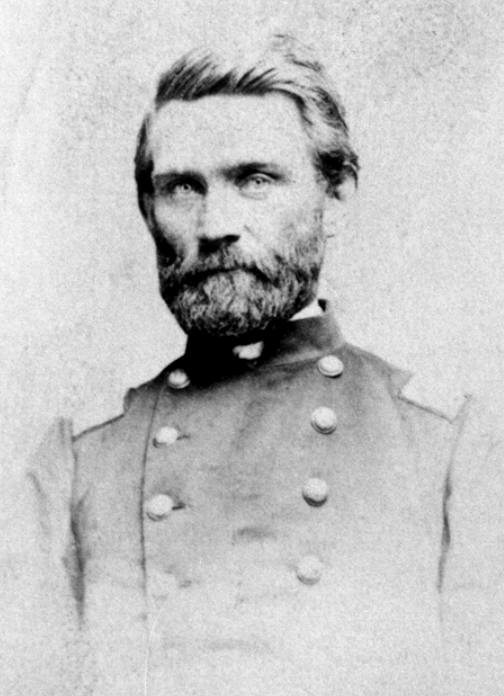
Samuel Allen Rice in 1864

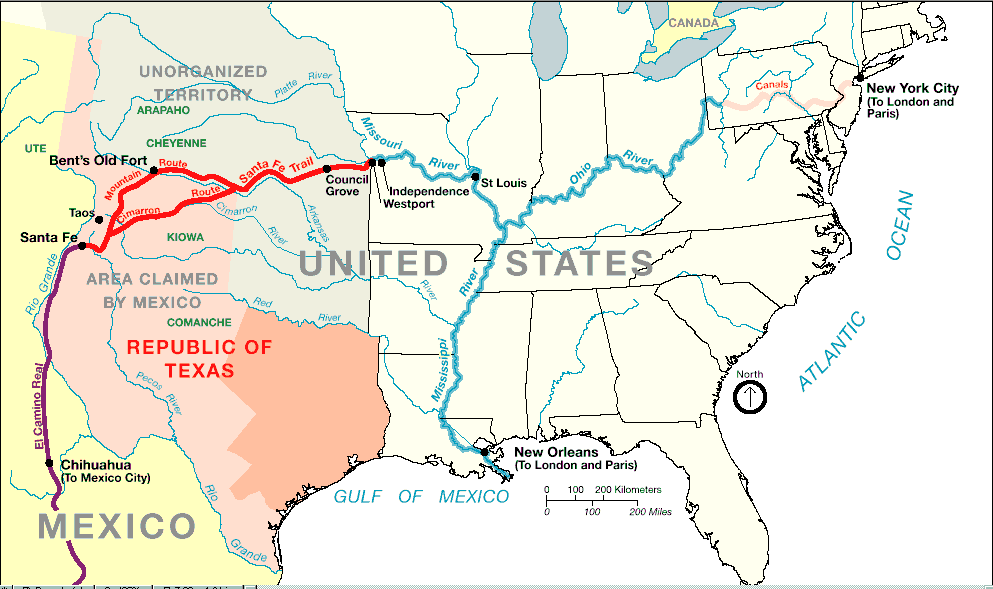
1845 Santa Fe Trail crossing Rice County

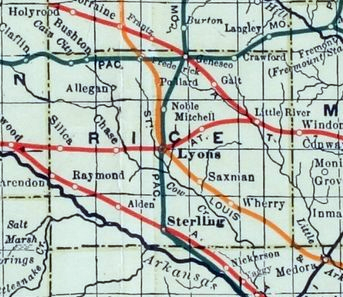
1915-1918 Railroad Map of Rice County

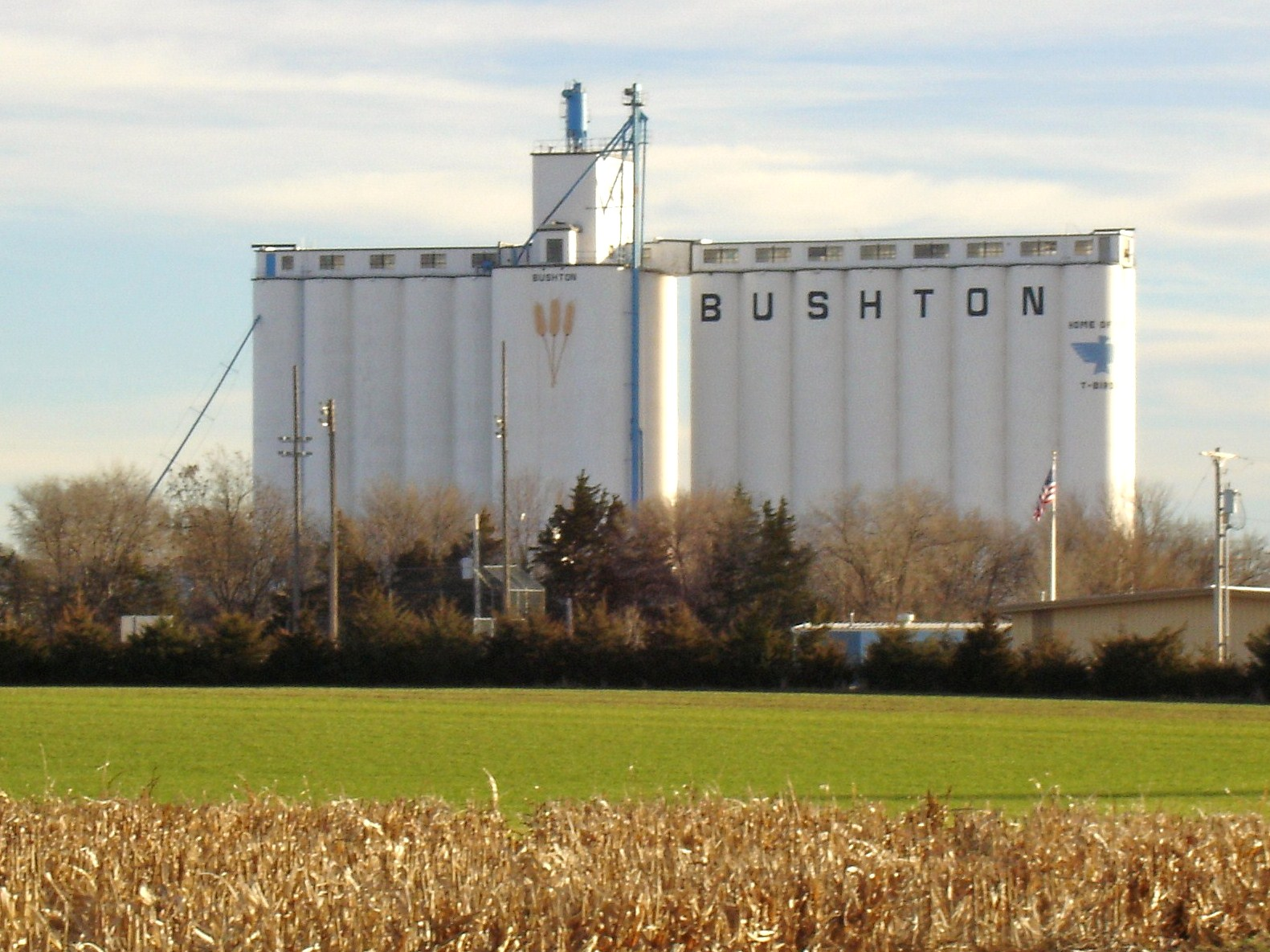
Bushton Grain Elevators (2004)

== Geography ==
According to the U.S. Census Bureau, the county has a total area of 728 square miles (1,890 km^{2}), of which 726 square miles (1,880 km^{2}) is land and 1.7 square miles (4.4 km^{2}) (0.2%) is water.

=== Adjacent counties ===
- Ellsworth County (north)
- McPherson County (east)
- Reno County (south)
- Stafford County (southwest)
- Barton County (northwest)

=== National protected area ===
- Quivira National Wildlife Refuge (part)

== Demographics ==
Historical population
Census	Pop.	Note	%±
1870	5		—
1880	9,292		185,740.0%
1890	14,451		55.5%
1900	14,745		2.0%
1910	15,106		2.4%
1920	14,832		−1.8%
1930	13,800		−7.0%
1940	17,213		24.7%
1950	15,635		−9.2%
1960	13,909		−11.0%
1970	12,320		−11.4%
1980	11,900		−3.4%
1990	10,610		−10.8%
2000	10,761		1.4%
2010	10,083		−6.3%
2020	9,427		−6.5%
2025 (est.)	9,266	▼	−1.7%
U.S. Decennial Census; 1790-1960 1900-1990; 1990-2000 2010-2020

=== Racial and ethnic composition ===
Rice County, Kansas – Racial and ethnic composition Note: the US Census treats Hispanic/Latino as an ethnic category. This table excludes Latinos from the racial categories and assigns them to a separate category. Hispanics/Latinos may be of any race.
Race / Ethnicity (NH = Non-Hispanic)	Pop 1980	Pop 1990	Pop 2000	Pop 2010	Pop 2020	% 1980	% 1990	% 2000	% 2010	% 2020
White alone (NH)	11,379	10,141	9,837	8,683	7,520	95.62%	95.58%	91.41%	86.12%	79.77%
Black or African American alone (NH)	106	116	122	112	130	0.89%	1.09%	1.13%	1.11%	1.38%
Native American or Alaska Native alone (NH)	78	51	59	55	41	0.66%	0.48%	0.55%	0.55%	0.43%
Asian alone (NH)	23	18	36	37	30	0.19%	0.17%	0.33%	0.37%	0.32%
Native Hawaiian or Pacific Islander alone (NH)	x	x	3	5	0	x	x	0.03%	0.05%	0.00%
Other race alone (NH)	25	5	0	2	14	0.21%	0.05%	0.00%	0.02%	0.15%
Mixed race or Multiracial (NH)	x	x	100	171	402	x	x	0.93%	1.70%	4.26%
Hispanic or Latino (any race)	289	279	604	1,018	1,290	2.43%	2.63%	5.61%	10.10%	13.68%
Total	11,900	10,610	10,761	10,083	9,427	100.00%	100.00%	100.00%	100.00%	100.00%

=== 2020 census ===
As of the 2020 census, the county had a population of 9,427. The median age was 39.9 years. 23.2% of residents were under the age of 18 and 20.1% of residents were 65 years of age or older. For every 100 females there were 100.3 males, and for every 100 females age 18 and over there were 98.2 males age 18 and over.

The racial makeup of the county was 83.3% White, 1.5% Black or African American, 0.7% American Indian and Alaska Native, 0.3% Asian, 0.0% Native Hawaiian and Pacific Islander, 4.6% from some other race, and 9.5% from two or more races. Hispanic or Latino residents of any race comprised 13.7% of the population.

0.0% of residents lived in urban areas, while 100.0% lived in rural areas.

There were 3,744 households in the county, of which 30.4% had children under the age of 18 living with them and 23.9% had a female householder with no spouse or partner present. About 29.8% of all households were made up of individuals and 14.7% had someone living alone who was 65 years of age or older.

There were 4,377 housing units, of which 14.5% were vacant. Among occupied housing units, 75.2% were owner-occupied and 24.8% were renter-occupied. The homeowner vacancy rate was 2.4% and the rental vacancy rate was 16.3%.

=== 2000 census ===
As of the census of 2000, there were 10,761 people, 4,050 households, and 2,830 families residing in the county. The population density was 15 people per square mile (5.8 people/km^{2}). There were 4,609 housing units at an average density of 6 per square mile (2.3/km^{2}). The racial makeup of the county was 94.68% White, 1.15% Black or African American, 0.57% Native American, 0.33% Asian, 0.04% Pacific Islander, 1.84% from other races, and 1.39% from two or more races. 5.61% of the population were Hispanic or Latino of any race.

There were 4,050 households, out of which 31.20% had children under the age of 18 living with them, 59.10% were married couples living together, 7.20% had a female householder with no husband present, and 30.10% were non-families. 27.80% of all households were made up of individuals, and 15.30% had someone living alone who was 65 years of age or older. The average household size was 2.44 and the average family size was 2.97.

In the county, the population was spread out, with 24.70% under the age of 18, 13.30% from 18 to 24, 22.80% from 25 to 44, 21.30% from 45 to 64, and 18.00% who were 65 years of age or older. The median age was 38 years. For every 100 females there were 92.20 males. For every 100 females age 18 and over, there were 88.20 males.

The median income for a household in the county was $35,671, and the median income for a family was $40,960. Males had a median income of $31,175 versus $18,968 for females. The per capita income for the county was $16,064. About 8.50% of families and 10.70% of the population were below the poverty line, including 14.60% of those under age 18 and 8.20% of those age 65 or over.

== Government ==
=== Presidential elections ===
Presidential election results

United States presidential election results for Rice County, Kansas
Year	Republican		Democratic		Third party(ies)	
Year	No.	%	No.	%	No.	%
1888	1,851	57.79%	934	29.16%	418	13.05%
1892	1,724	46.78%	0	0.00%	1,961	53.22%
1896	1,729	48.75%	1,731	48.80%	87	2.45%
1900	2,013	54.42%	1,527	41.28%	159	4.30%
1904	1,994	64.16%	727	23.39%	387	12.45%
1908	1,832	51.35%	1,407	39.43%	329	9.22%
1912	697	20.57%	1,314	38.77%	1,378	40.66%
1916	2,494	42.62%	2,801	47.86%	557	9.52%
1920	3,651	68.95%	1,532	28.93%	112	2.12%
1924	3,920	68.53%	1,303	22.78%	497	8.69%
1928	4,321	74.05%	1,462	25.06%	52	0.89%
1932	3,107	49.33%	3,037	48.22%	154	2.45%
1936	3,318	40.24%	4,905	59.49%	22	0.27%
1940	4,792	56.49%	3,635	42.85%	56	0.66%
1944	4,024	61.12%	2,505	38.05%	55	0.84%
1948	4,002	58.15%	2,752	39.99%	128	1.86%
1952	5,572	74.51%	1,832	24.50%	74	0.99%
1956	4,638	70.48%	1,926	29.27%	17	0.26%
1960	4,329	64.81%	2,328	34.85%	23	0.34%
1964	2,390	39.19%	3,665	60.10%	43	0.71%
1968	3,141	56.23%	2,049	36.68%	396	7.09%
1972	3,843	66.22%	1,825	31.45%	135	2.33%
1976	2,584	44.82%	3,056	53.01%	125	2.17%
1980	3,211	57.67%	1,847	33.17%	510	9.16%
1984	3,598	68.68%	1,559	29.76%	82	1.57%
1988	2,503	53.89%	2,033	43.77%	109	2.35%
1992	2,158	40.94%	1,555	29.50%	1,558	29.56%
1996	2,842	59.34%	1,434	29.94%	513	10.71%
2000	2,903	64.23%	1,422	31.46%	195	4.31%
2004	3,182	72.71%	1,130	25.82%	64	1.46%
2008	2,780	69.14%	1,163	28.92%	78	1.94%
2012	2,676	72.70%	911	24.75%	94	2.55%
2016	2,837	74.58%	695	18.27%	272	7.15%
2020	3,262	75.53%	965	22.34%	92	2.13%
2024	3,073	77.48%	825	20.80%	68	1.71%

=== Laws ===
The Kansas Constitution was amended in 1986 to allow the sale of alcoholic liquor by the individual drink with the approval of voters, either with or without a minimum of 30% of sales coming from food. Rice County is one of 35 counties in the state that allows for the sale of liquor by the drink without the minimum food sales stipulation.

== Education ==
=== Colleges ===
- Sterling College in Sterling

=== Unified school districts ===
- Sterling USD 376
- Chase–Raymond USD 401
- Lyons USD 405
- Little River–Windom USD 444

School district office in neighboring county

- Central Plains USD 112

== Communities ==
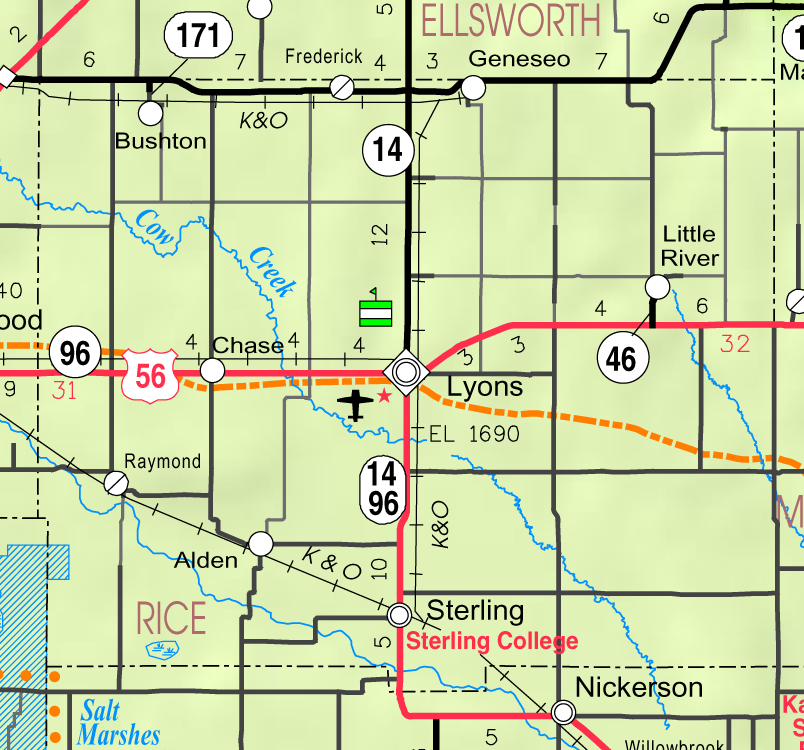
2005 map of Rice County (map legend)

List of townships / incorporated cities / unincorporated communities / extinct former communities within Rice County.

=== Cities ===
- Alden
- Bushton
- Chase
- Frederick
- Geneseo
- Little River
- Lyons (county seat)
- Raymond
- Sterling

=== Unincorporated communities ===
- Mitchell
- Pollard
- Saxman
- Silica

=== Ghost towns ===
- Crawford
- Galt

=== Townships ===
Rice County is divided into twenty townships. The cities of Lyons and Sterling are considered governmentally independent and are excluded from the census figures for the townships. In the following table, the population center is the largest city (or cities) included in that township's population total, if it is of a significant size.

Sources: 2000 U.S. Gazetteer from the U.S. Census Bureau.
Township	FIPS	Population center	Population	Population density /km^{2} (/sq mi)	Land area km^{2} (sq mi)	Water area km^{2} (sq mi)	Water %	Geographic coordinates
Atlanta	03075		233	3 (7)	90 (35)	0 (0)	0.25%	38°18′22″N 98°11′58″W
Bell	05375		18	0 (0)	94 (36)	1 (0)	0.65%	38°13′10″N 98°24′2″W
Center	12075		136	1 (4)	95 (37)	0 (0)	0.04%	38°17′50″N 98°18′12″W
East Washington	19725		179	2 (5)	93 (36)	0 (0)	0.03%	38°13′18″N 97°58′34″W
Eureka	21900		65	1 (2)	95 (37)	0 (0)	0%	38°29′52″N 98°19′21″W
Farmer	23100		441	5 (12)	94 (36)	0 (0)	0%	38°30′0″N 98°24′55″W
Galt	25175		51	1 (1)	94 (36)	0 (0)	0.22%	38°28′8″N 98°5′59″W
Harrison	30425		192	2 (5)	92 (35)	0 (0)	0.06%	38°23′3″N 98°11′49″W
Lincoln	41100		577	6 (16)	95 (37)	0 (0)	0%	38°22′10″N 98°19′19″W
Mitchell	47525		131	1 (4)	94 (36)	0 (0)	0.18%	38°23′24″N 98°5′42″W
Odessa	52150		55	1 (2)	93 (36)	0 (0)	0.10%	38°28′17″N 97°59′21″W
Pioneer	55925		101	1 (3)	94 (36)	0 (0)	0.03%	38°23′34″N 98°25′39″W
Raymond	58575		185	2 (5)	92 (36)	1 (0)	0.71%	38°17′38″N 98°24′56″W
Rockville	60725		134	1 (4)	93 (36)	0 (0)	0.04%	38°18′17″N 97°57′36″W
Sterling	68225		223	2 (5)	114 (44)	1 (0)	1.01%	38°12′19″N 98°11′44″W
Union	72325		741	8 (21)	93 (36)	0 (0)	0%	38°23′34″N 97°59′32″W
Valley	73100		276	4 (9)	77 (30)	1 (0)	1.11%	38°13′27″N 98°18′44″W
Victoria	73825		364	4 (10)	94 (36)	0 (0)	0.06%	38°29′57″N 98°10′24″W
West Washington	77425		138	1 (4)	93 (36)	0 (0)	0.12%	38°13′9″N 98°4′58″W
Wilson	79775		147	2 (4)	94 (36)	0 (0)	0.02%	38°18′2″N 98°6′2″W

== Trivia ==
The CW television series Superman & Lois places Superman's home town of Smallville in Rice County ("Pilot").

== See also ==
- Dry counties
- National Register of Historic Places listings in Rice County, Kansas

Community information for Kansas

- Kansas locations by per capita income
- List of counties in Kansas
- List of townships in Kansas
- List of cities in Kansas
- List of unincorporated communities in Kansas
- List of ghost towns in Kansas
