= Mayor of Kansas City, Kansas =

Head executive of Kansas City, Kansas

- Incumbent; Christal Watson since December 13, 2025
- Inaugural holder: James R. Parr
- Formation: 1859
- Website: Mayors Office

The mayor of Kansas City, Kansas is the highest official of the city government. In 1997, voters approved the consolidation of Kansas City, Kansas government with that of Wyandotte County. The office has since been referred to as "mayor/CEO" of the "United Government of Wyandotte County and Kansas City, Kansas." However, in popular terms, the head executive is called the mayor.

The following is a list of mayors of the city and the original towns that were consolidated into it.

== List of mayors ==
=== Elected before the 1886 consolidation ===
Mayors of Wyandotte, Kansas
#	Name	Took office	Left office	Terms
1	James R. Parr	1859	1860	1
2	George Russell	1860	1862	2
3	Stephen A. Cobb	1862	1863	1
4	J. M. Funk	1863	1865	2
5	Issaac B. Sharp	1865	1867	2
6	James McGrew	1867	1868	1
3	Stephen A. Cobb	1868	1869	1
7	Byron Judd	1869	1870	1
8	J. S. Stockton	1870	1873	3
6	James McGrew	1873	1874	1
9	George B. Wood	1874	1875	1
10	C. Hains	1875	1877	2
11	Fred Speck	1877	1879	2
8	J. S. Stockton	1879	1881	2
12	R. E. Cable	1881	1883	2
13	D. E. Cornell	1883	1885	2
14	J. C. Martin	1885	1886	1

Mayors of "old" Kansas City
#	Name	Took office	Left office
1	James Boyle	October 22, 1872	
2	C. A. Eidenmiller		
3	A. S. Orbinson		
4	Eli Teed		
5	Samuel McConnell	April 1881	April 1883
6	R. W. Hilliker	April 1883	April 1885
7	James Phillips	April 1885	April 1886

=== Elected after the 1886 consolidation ===
Mayors of consolidated Kansas City
#	Name	Took office	Left office
1	Thomas F. Hannan	1886	1889
2	William Allen Coy	1889	1891
3	Thomas F. Hannan	1891	1893
4	Nathaniel Barnes	1893	1895
5	George J. Twiss	1895	1897
6	Robert L. Marshman	1897	1901
7	William H. Craddock	1901	1903
8	Thomas B. Gilbert	1903	1905
9	William W. Rose	1905	1906
10	George M. Gray	1906	1907
11	Dudley E. Cornell	1907	1909
12	Ulysses Samuel Guyer	1909	1910
13	James E. Porter	1910	1913
14	C. W. Green	1913	1917
15	Harry A Mendenhall	1917	1921
16	H. B. Burton	1921	1923
17	William W. Gordon	1923	1926
18	Jabez O. Emerson	1926	1927
19	Don C. McCombs	1927	1947
20	Clark E. Tucker	1947	1955
21	Paul F. Mitchum	1955	1964
22	Joseph H. McDowell	1964	1971
23	Richard F. Walsh	1972	1976
24	Jack Reardon	1976	1987
25	Joe Steineger	1987	1995

=== Elected after consolidation with Wyandotte County ===
Mayor and CEOs of the United Government of Wyandotte County and Kansas City, Kansas
#	Image	Name	Took office	Left office
26		Carol Marinovich (Note: Carol Marinovich was elected as mayor of Kansas City, Kansas in 1995. The city was consolidated with Wyandotte County during her first term.)	1995	2006
27		Joe Reardon	2006	2013
28		Mark Holland	2013	2018
29		David Alvey	2018	2021
30		Tyrone Garner	2021	2026
31		Christal Watson	2026	Incumbent

== See also ==
- List of mayors of Kansas City, Missouri
- Lists of people from Kansas
