= Galt Township, Kansas =

Township in Rice County, Kansas, U.S.

Galt Township
- Township
- Location within Rice County
- Coordinates: 38.479515°N 98.090747°W
- Country: United States
- State: Kansas
- County: Rice

Government
  - District 3 County Commissioner: Terry David

Area
  - Total: 36.25 sq mi (93.9 km^{2})
  - Land: 36.17 sq mi (93.7 km^{2})
  - Water: 0.08 sq mi (0.21 km^{2}) 0.22%

Population (2020)
  - Total: 81
  - Density: 2.2/sq mi (0.86/km^{2})
- Time zone: UTC-6 (CST)
  - Summer (DST): UTC-5 (CDT)
- Area code: 620
- GNIS feature ID: 475562

Galt Township is a township in Rice County, Kansas, United States. As of the 2020 census, its population was 81.

== History ==
Galt Township was created from parts of Victoria Township and Union Township. The township is home to the ghost town of Galt.

== Geography ==
Galt Township covers an area of 36.25 square miles (93.9 square kilometers).

=== Adjacent townships ===
Trivoli Township, Ellsworth County
Thomas Township, Ellsworth County	northwest	north	northeast	Langley Township, Ellsworth County
Victoria Township, Rice County	west	self	east	Odessa Township, Rice County
Harrison Township, Rice County	southwest	south	southeast	Union Township, Rice County
Mitchell Township, Rice County

== Transportation ==
=== Major highways ===
- K-4
