= National Register of Historic Places listings in Ellsworth County, Kansas =

Location of Ellsworth County in Kansas

Ellsworth County, Kansas, United States, has 22 properties and districts listed on the National Register of Historic Places.

The locations of National Register properties and districts for which the latitude and longitude coordinates are included below may be seen in a map.

This National Park Service list is complete through NPS recent listings posted June 6, 2026.

== Current listings ==
	Name on the Register	Image	Date listed	Location	City or town	Description
1	Archeological Site Number 14EW14		July 9, 1982 (#82004861)	Address restricted	Carneiro	
2	Archeological Site Number 14EW17		July 9, 1982 (#82004874)	Address restricted	Ellsworth	
3	Archeological Site Number 14EW33		July 9, 1982 (#82004862)	Address restricted	Carneiro	
4	Archeological Site Number 14EW303		July 9, 1982 (#82004875)	Address restricted	Ellsworth	
5	Archeological Site Number 14EW401		July 9, 1982 (#82004876)	Address restricted	Ellsworth	
6	Archeological Site Number 14EW403		July 9, 1982 (#82004877)	Address restricted	Carneiro	
7	Archeological Site Number 14EW404		July 9, 1982 (#82004878)	Address restricted	Ellsworth	
8	Archeological Site Number 14EW405		July 9, 1982 (#82004863)	Address restricted	Geneseo	
9	Archeological Site Number 14EW406		July 9, 1982 (#82004879)	Address restricted	Ellsworth	
10	Ellsworth Downtown Historic District	Ellsworth Downtown Historic District	October 10, 2007 (#07001065)	Generally including blocks between N. Main & 3rd Sts. from Lincoln to Kansas Aves. and the west side of Kansas Ave. 38°43′48″N 98°13′50″W	Ellsworth	
11	Fort Harker Guardhouse	Fort Harker Guardhouse	February 23, 1972 (#72000497)	Northwestern corner of Wyoming and Ohio Sts., Fort Harker site 38°42′37″N 98°09′41″W	Kanopolis	Included in Fort Harker Museum
12	Fort Harker Officers' Quarters	Fort Harker Officers' Quarters	November 20, 1974 (#74000834)	Ohio St. between Kansas and Colorado Sts., Fort Harker site 38°42′38″N 98°09′32″W	Kanopolis	Included in Fort Harker Museum.
13	Perry Hodgden House	Perry Hodgden House	January 29, 1973 (#73000754)	104 W. Main St. 38°43′42″N 98°13′58″W	Ellsworth	
14	Holyrood Santa Fe Depot	Holyrood Santa Fe Depot	May 17, 2010 (#10000262)	Between Main St and Smith St. 38°35′16″N 98°24′39″W	Holyrood	
15	Indian Hill Site		December 31, 1974 (#74000835)	Southeastern quarter of the southeastern quarter of Section 28, Township 16 South, Range 6 West; 38°37′35″N 97°58′55″W	Marquette	
16	Insurance Building	Insurance Building	July 11, 2006 (#06000595)	115 N. Douglas Ave. 38°43′45″N 98°13′52″W	Ellsworth	
17	Arthur Larkin House	Arthur Larkin House	February 24, 1975 (#75000712)	0.25 mile south of Ellsworth off K-45; 38°43′20″N 98°14′14″W	Ellsworth	
18	Ira E Lloyd Stock Farm	Ira E Lloyd Stock Farm	January 7, 2015 (#14001118)	1575 Ave. JJ; 38°43′58″N 98°12′34″W	Ellsworth	
19	Midland Hotel	Midland Hotel	July 3, 2002 (#02000716)	414 26th St. 38°49′32″N 98°28′23″W	Wilson	
20	Weinhold House	Weinhold House	March 2, 2001 (#01000185)	2315 C Ave. 38°49′39″N 98°28′14″W	Wilson	
21	Wilson Downtown Historic District #1-Main St.	Wilson Downtown Historic District #1-Main St.	July 15, 1998 (#03001496)	Roughly along Main St., 24th St., 25th St., and 26th St. 38°49′36″N 98°28′25″W	Wilson	
22	Wilson Downtown Historic District #3-Southside	Wilson Downtown Historic District #3-Southside	January 28, 2004 (#03001497)	400 block of 27th St., "Old Highway 40"; 38°49′27″N 98°28′25″W	Wilson	

== See also ==
- List of National Historic Landmarks in Kansas
- National Register of Historic Places listings in Kansas
