= Clear Creek Township, Kansas =

Clear Creek Township, Kansas may refer to one of the following places:

- Clear Creek Township, Ellsworth County, Kansas
- Clear Creek Township, Marion County, Kansas
- Clear Creek Township, Nemaha County, Kansas
- Clear Creek Township, Pottawatomie County, Kansas
- Clear Creek Township, Stafford County, Kansas

== See also ==
- List of Kansas townships
- Clear Creek Township (disambiguation)
