= Eureka Township, Rice County, Kansas =

Township in Rice County, Kansas, U.S.

Eureka Township
- Township
- Location within Rice County
- Coordinates: 38.478385°N 98.313257°W
- Country: United States
- State: Kansas
- County: Rice

Government
  - District 1 County Commissioner: Derek McCloud

Area
  - Total: 36.599 sq mi (94.79 km^{2})
  - Land: 36.599 sq mi (94.79 km^{2})
  - Water: 0 sq mi (0 km^{2}) 0%

Population (2020)
  - Total: 31
  - Density: 0.85/sq mi (0.33/km^{2})
- Time zone: UTC-6 (CST)
  - Summer (DST): UTC-5 (CDT)
- Area code: 620
- GNIS feature ID: 475552

Eureka Township is a township in Rice County, Kansas, United States. As of the 2020 census, its population was 31.

== History ==
Eureka Township was originally part of Farmer Township before being split off.

== Geography ==
Eureka Township covers an area of 36.599 square miles (94.79 square kilometers).

=== Communities ===
- Frederick

=== Adjacent townships ===
Green Garden Township, Ellsworth County
Valley Township, Ellsworth County	northwest	north	northeast	Thomas Township, Ellsworth County
Farmer Township, Rice County	west	self	east	Victoria Township, Rice County
Pioneer Township, Rice County	southwest	south	southeast	Harrison Township, Rice County
Lincoln Township, Rice County

== Transportation ==
=== Major highways ===
- K-4
