= Marquette Township, Kansas =

Township in McPherson County, Kansas, U.S.

Marquette Township
- Township
- Location within McPherson County
- Coordinates: 38.569478°N 97.856722°W
- Country: United States
- State: Kansas
- County: McPherson

Area
  - Total: 36.027 sq mi (93.31 km^{2})
  - Land: 35.793 sq mi (92.70 km^{2})
  - Water: 0.234 sq mi (0.61 km^{2}) 0.65%

Population (2020)
  - Total: 733
  - Density: 20.5/sq mi (7.91/km^{2})
- Time zone: UTC-6 (CST)
  - Summer (DST): UTC-5 (CDT)
- Area code(s): 620, 785

Marquette Township is a township in McPherson County, Kansas, United States. As of the 2020 census, its population was 733.

== Geography ==
Marquette Township covers an area of 36.027 square miles (93.31 square kilometers). The Smoky Hill River flows through it.

=== Communities ===
- Marquette

=== Adjacent townships ===
- Falun Township, Saline County (north)
- Union Township, McPherson County (east)
- Harper Township, McPherson County (southeast)
- South Sharps Creek Township, McPherson County (south)
- Odessa Township, Rice County (southwest)
- Langley Township, Ellsworth County (west)
- Empire Township, Ellsworth County (northwest)

=== Major highways ===
- K-4
