= Farmer Township, Rice County, Kansas =

Township in Rice County, Kansas, U.S.

Farmer Township
- Township
- Location within Rice County
- Coordinates: 38.49°N 98.40°W
- Country: United States
- State: Kansas
- County: Rice
- Established: 1874

Government
  - District 1 County Commissioner: Derek McCloud

Area
  - Total: 36.209 sq mi (93.78 km^{2})
  - Land: 36.209 sq mi (93.78 km^{2})
  - Water: 0 sq mi (0 km^{2}) 0%

Population (2020)
  - Total: 312
  - Density: 8.62/sq mi (3.33/km^{2})
- Time zone: UTC-6 (CST)
  - Summer (DST): UTC-5 (CDT)
- Area code: 620
- GNIS feature ID: 475540

Farmer Township is a township in Rice County, Kansas, United States. As of the 2020 census, its population was 312.

== History ==
Farmer Township was established in 1874. It was originally called Spencer Township, but was changed to Farmer Township. In 1879, Lincoln Township and Pioneer Township were split off from it. Eureka Township would also later be split off from Farmer Township.

== Geography ==
Farmer Township covers an area of 36.209 square miles (93.78 square kilometers).

=== Communities ===
- Bushton

=== Adjacent townships ===
Valley Township, Ellsworth County
| Independent Township, Barton County | northwest | north | northeast | Green Garden Township, Ellsworth County |
| Logan Township, Barton County | west | self | east | Eureka Township, Rice County |
| Lakin Township, Barton County | southwest | south | southeast | Lincoln Township, Rice County |
Pioneer Township, Rice County

== Transportation ==
=== Major highways ===
- K-4
