= Odessa Township, Rice County, Kansas =

Township in Rice County, Kansas, U.S.

Odessa Township
- Township
- Location within Rice County
- Coordinates: 38.498622°N 97.98367°W
- Country: United States
- State: Kansas
- County: Rice
- Established: 1910s

Government
  - District 3 County Commissioner: Terry David

Area
  - Total: 36.067 sq mi (93.41 km^{2})
  - Land: 36.036 sq mi (93.33 km^{2})
  - Water: 0.031 sq mi (0.080 km^{2}) 0.09%

Population (2020)
  - Total: 59
  - Density: 1.6/sq mi (0.63/km^{2})
- Time zone: UTC-6 (CST)
  - Summer (DST): UTC-5 (CDT)
- Area code: 620
- GNIS feature ID: 475572

Odessa Township is a township in Rice County, Kansas, United States. As of the 2020 census, its population was 59.

== History ==
Odessa Township was created in the 1910s from Union Township. The township is home to the ghost town of Crawford.

== Geography ==
Odessa Township covers an area of 36.067 square miles (93.41 square kilometers).

=== Adjacent townships ===
Langley Township, Ellsworth County
| Trivoli Township, Ellsworth County | northwest | north | northeast | Marquette Township, McPherson County |
| Galt Township, Rice County | west | self | east | South Sharps Creek Township, McPherson County |
| Mitchell Township, Rice County | southwest | south | southeast | Castle Township, McPherson County |
Union Township, Rice County

== Transportation ==
=== Major highways ===
- K-4
