= South Sharps Creek Township, Kansas =

Township in McPherson County, Kansas, U.S.

South Sharps Creek Township
- Township
- Location within McPherson County
- Coordinates: 38.486864°N 97.872679°W
- Country: United States
- State: Kansas
- County: McPherson

Area
  - Total: 36.157 sq mi (93.65 km^{2})
  - Land: 36.095 sq mi (93.49 km^{2})
  - Water: 0.062 sq mi (0.16 km^{2}) 0.17%

Population (2020)
  - Total: 116
  - Density: 3.21/sq mi (1.24/km^{2})
- Time zone: UTC-6 (CST)
  - Summer (DST): UTC-5 (CDT)
- Area code: 620

South Sharps Creek Township is a township in McPherson County, Kansas, United States. As of the 2020 census, its population was 116.

== Geography ==
South Sharps Creek Township covers an area of 36.157 square miles (93.65 square kilometers).

=== Adjacent townships ===
- Marquette Township, McPherson County (north)
- Union Township, McPherson County (northeast)
- Harper Township, McPherson County (east)
- Jackson Township, McPherson County (southeast)
- Castle Township, McPherson County (south)
- Union Township, Rice County (southwest)
- Odessa Township, Rice County (west)
- Langley Township, Ellsworth County (northwest)
