= Clearcreek Township, Ohio =

Clearcreek Township, Ohio, or Clear Creek Township, Ohio, may refer to:

- Clear Creek Township, Ashland County, Ohio
- Clearcreek Township, Fairfield County, Ohio
- Clearcreek Township, Warren County, Ohio

== See also ==
- Clear Creek Township (disambiguation)
