= Victoria Township, Rice County, Kansas =

Township in Rice County, Kansas, U.S.

Victoria Township
- Township
- Location within Rice County
- Coordinates: 38°28′29″N 98°10′12″W
- Country: United States
- State: Kansas
- County: Rice
- Established: 1877

Government
  - District 2 County Commissioner: Terry David

Area
  - Total: 36.239 sq mi (93.86 km^{2})
  - Land: 36.219 sq mi (93.81 km^{2})
  - Water: 0.02 sq mi (0.052 km^{2}) 0.06%

Population (2020)
  - Total: 333
  - Density: 9.19/sq mi (3.55/km^{2})
- Time zone: UTC-6 (CST)
  - Summer (DST): UTC-5 (CDT)
- Area code: 620
- GNIS feature ID: 475561

Victoria Township is a township in Rice County, Kansas, United States. As of the 2020 census, its population was 333.

== History ==
Victoria Township was established in 1877. It was created from part of Atlanta Township. Victoria Township would end up losing land to create Galt Township, Mitchell Township, and Harrison Township.

== Geography ==
Victoria Township covers an area of 36.239 square miles (93.86 square kilometers). The Arkansas River flows through it.

=== Communities ===
- Geneseo

=== Adjacent townships ===
Thomas Township, Ellsworth County
| Green Garden Township, Rice County | northwest | north | northeast | Trivoli Township, Ellsworth County |
| Eureka Township, Rice County | west | self | east | Galt Township, Rice County |
| Lincoln Township, Rice County | southwest | south | southeast | Mitchell Township, Rice County |
Harrison Township, Rice County

== Demographics ==
According to the 2020 census Victoria Township had a population of 333 and a population density of 9.19 inhabitants/sq mi (3.55/km^{2}). The racial makeup of the 333 inhabitants was 91% white, 0.9% African American, 0.3% Native American, 0% Asian, 0% Pacific Islander, 0.3% other races, and 7.5% from two or more races. 3.6% of the population were Hispanic or Latino of any race.

== Transportation ==
=== Major highways ===
- K-4
- K-14
