= Clear Creek Township, Indiana =

Clear Creek Township is the name of two townships in the U.S. state of Indiana:

- Clear Creek Township, Huntington County, Indiana
- Clear Creek Township, Monroe County, Indiana

== See also ==
- Clear Creek Township (disambiguation)
