= Odin, Kansas =

Unincorporated community in Barton County, Kansas

- CDP
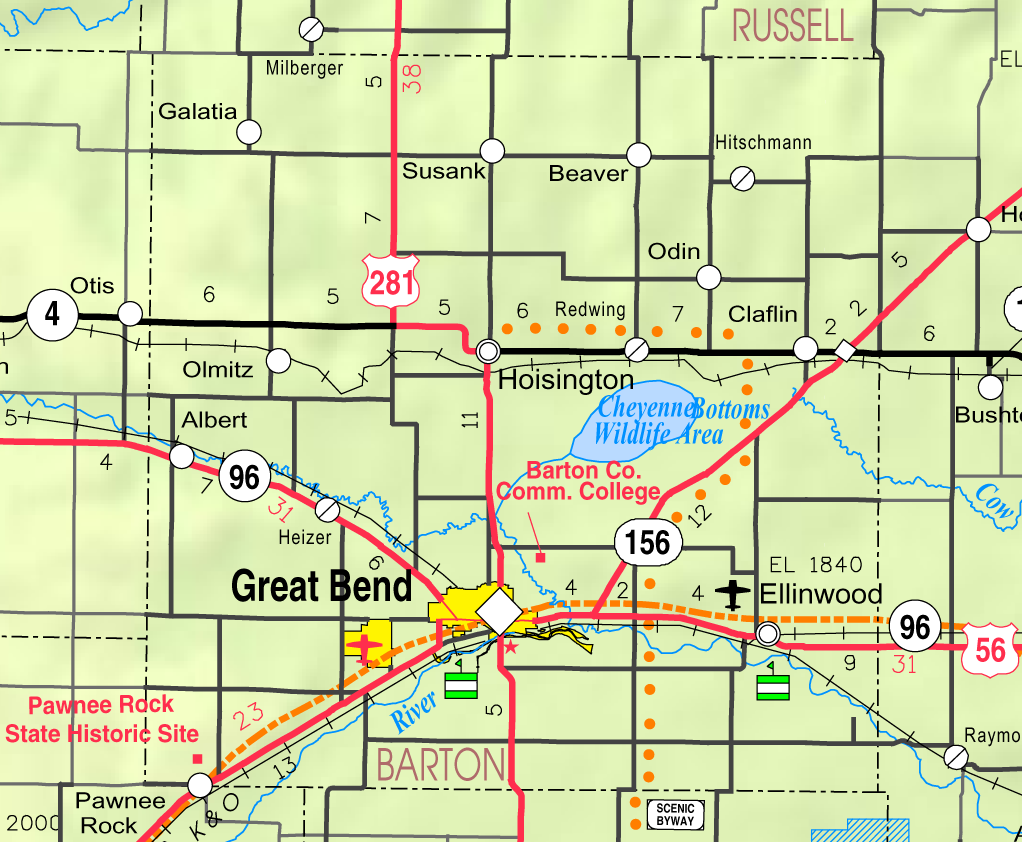
- KDOT map of Barton County (legend)

- Location within Kansas Location within the United States
- Coordinates: 38°33′58″N 98°36′31″W
- Country: United States
- State: Kansas
- County: Barton

Area
  - Total: 4.0 sq mi (10.4 km^{2})
  - Land: 4.0 sq mi (10.4 km^{2})
  - Water: 0 sq mi (0.0 km^{2})
- Elevation: 1,844 ft (562 m)

Population (2020)
  - Total: 87
  - Density: 22/sq mi (8.4/km^{2})
- Time zone: UTC-6 (CST)
  - Summer (DST): UTC-5 (CDT)
- Area code: 620
- FIPS code: 20-52175
- GNIS ID: 475528

Odin a census-designated place (CDP) in Barton County, Kansas, United States. As of the 2020 census, the population was 87. It is located northwest of Claflin at the intersection of NE 140 Rd and NE 90 Ave.

== History ==
Odin had a post office from 1877 until 1906. The post office was re-established in 1950, and finally closed again in 1995.

== Geography ==
According to the United States Census Bureau, the CDP has a total area of 4.0 square miles (10.4 km^{2}), of which 0.008 square miles (0.02 km^{2}), or 0.18%, is water.

== Demographics ==
Historical population
| Census | Pop. | Note | %± |
|---|---|---|---|
| 2010 | 101 | | — |
| 2020 | 87 | | −13.9% |
U.S. Decennial Census

The 2020 United States census counted 87 people, 38 households, and 27 families in Odin. The population density was 21.8 per square mile (8.4/km^{2}). There were 56 housing units at an average density of 14.0 per square mile (5.4/km^{2}). The racial makeup was 100.0% (87) white or European American (100.0% non-Hispanic white), 0.0% (0) black or African-American, 0.0% (0) Native American or Alaska Native, 0.0% (0) Asian, 0.0% (0) Pacific Islander or Native Hawaiian, 0.0% (0) from other races, and 0.0% (0) from two or more races. Hispanic or Latino of any race was 0.0% (0) of the population.

Of the 38 households, 34.2% had children under the age of 18; 63.2% were married couples living together; 10.5% had a female householder with no spouse or partner present. 28.9% of households consisted of individuals and 13.2% had someone living alone who was 65 years of age or older. The average household size was 2.1 and the average family size was 4.1. The percent of those with a bachelor's degree or higher was estimated to be 16.1% of the population.

24.1% of the population was under the age of 18, 4.6% from 18 to 24, 26.4% from 25 to 44, 27.6% from 45 to 64, and 17.2% who were 65 years of age or older. The median age was 40.5 years. For every 100 females, there were 97.7 males. For every 100 females ages 18 and older, there were 106.2 males.

The 2016–2020 5-year American Community Survey estimates show that the median household income was $21,645 (with a margin of error of +/- $5,990). The median income for those above 16 years old was $22,171 (+/- $21,426). Approximately, 60.0% of families and 18.9% of the population were below the poverty line, including 0.0% of those under the age of 18 and 50.0% of those ages 65 or over.

== Education ==
The community is served by Central Plains USD 112 public school district.

Odin schools were closed in 1974 through school unification. The Odin High School mascot was Odin Tigers.
