= Palacký (disambiguation) =

František Palacký (1798–1876) was a Czech historian and politician.

Palacký or Palacky may also refer to:

- Palacký Bridge, a bridge in Prague, Czech Republic
- Palacky Township, Ellsworth County, Kansas, United States
- Palacký University Olomouc, Czech Republic
- 40444 Palacký, a main belt asteroid
