= Lincoln Township, Ellsworth County, Kansas =

Lincoln Township
- Township
- Location in Ellsworth County
- Coordinates: 38°39′09″N 098°18′49″W
- Country: United States
- State: Kansas
- County: Ellsworth

Area
  - Total: 36.79 sq mi (95.29 km^{2})
  - Land: 36.71 sq mi (95.09 km^{2})
  - Water: 0.081 sq mi (0.21 km^{2}) 0.22%
- Elevation: 1,814 ft (553 m)

Population (2020)
  - Total: 59
  - Density: 1.6/sq mi (0.62/km^{2})
- GNIS feature ID: 0475456

Lincoln Township is a township in Ellsworth County, Kansas, United States. As of the 2020 census, its population was 59.

== Geography ==
Lincoln Township covers an area of 36.79 square miles (95.3 km^{2}) and contains no incorporated settlements.
