= Castle Township, Kansas =

Township in McPherson County, Kansas, US

Castle Township
- Township
- Location within McPherson County
- Coordinates: 38.38°N 97.87°W
- Country: United States
- State: Kansas
- County: McPherson

Area
  - Total: 36.169 sq mi (93.68 km^{2})
  - Land: 36.078 sq mi (93.44 km^{2})
  - Water: 0.091 sq mi (0.24 km^{2}) 0.25%

Population (2020)
  - Total: 162
  - Density: 4.49/sq mi (1.73/km^{2})
- Time zone: UTC-6 (CST)
  - Summer (DST): UTC-5 (CDT)
- Area code: 620

Castle Township is a township in McPherson County, Kansas, United States. The area of Castle township is 36.169 square miles. As of 2020, the US Census Bureau's Decennial census determined a population of 162. In a total of 92 households, 59.8% of the people are married.

== History ==
Castle Township was organized in 1876.

== Geography ==
Castle Township covers an area of 35.902 square miles (92.99 square kilometers).

=== Communities ===
- Windom

=== Adjacent townships ===
- South Sharps Creek Township, McPherson County (north)
- Harper Township, McPherson County (northeast)
- Jackson Township, McPherson County (east)
- Groveland Township, McPherson County (southeast)
- Hayes Township, McPherson County (south)
- Rockville Township, Rice County (southwest)
- Union Township, Rice County (west)
- Odessa Township, Rice County (northwest)

=== Major highways ===
- US-56
