= Black Wolf Township, Kansas =

Black Wolf Township
- Township
- Location in Ellsworth County
- Coordinates: 38°44′25″N 098°19′06″W
- Country: United States
- State: Kansas
- County: Ellsworth

Area
  - Total: 36.38 sq mi (94.23 km^{2})
  - Land: 36.35 sq mi (94.14 km^{2})
  - Water: 0.035 sq mi (0.09 km^{2}) 0.1%
- Elevation: 1,535 ft (468 m)

Population (2020)
  - Total: 85
  - Density: 2.3/sq mi (0.90/km^{2})
- GNIS feature ID: 0475352

Black Wolf Township is a township in Ellsworth County, Kansas, United States. As of the 2020 census, its population was 85.

== Geography ==
Black Wolf Township covers an area of 36.38 square miles (94.2 km^{2}) and contains no incorporated settlements.

The streams of Buffalo Creek, Little Wolf Creek, Loss Creek, Turkey Creek and Wolf Creek run through this township.
