= Fort Ellsworth (Kansas) =

In 1864 Gen. Samuel R. Curtis established a military camp at the Fort Riley-Fort Larned Road crossing of the Smoky Hill River in what is now Ellsworth County, Kans.

The camp occupied a site where a stage station and trading ranch also operated. Daniel Page and Joseph Lehman established the hunting camp and trading ranch in 1860. The men gathered wolf and buffalo hides for trade. In 1862 the ranch became a station for the Kansas Stage Company. The station kept and fed mules that were changed when stagecoaches came through. The station was raided by Confederate soldiers in September of that year.

In August 1864 soldiers from the 7th Iowa Cavalry, under the command of 2nd Lt. Allen Ellsworth, established a fort four miles southeast of the site that eventually became Ellsworth, Kansas. A two-story blockhouse was built there. In July Maj. Gen. Samuel Curtis, the department commander, named the post Fort Ellsworth for Lt. Ellsworth.

The fort's mission was to protect the area settlers from hostile Indians. On August 7, 1864, Indians drove off and captured most of the post's horses and the mules belonging to the stage company servicing the area. The post remained with only two horses. Col. James H. Ford, who visited Fort Ellsworth in January 1865, noticed the post still only possessed nine horses. Ford, in charge of the district that included the post, ordered an additional company of cavalry to garrison it.

Even though some buildings were built by the end of the Civil War, the troops still had primitive housing. M. Wisner wrote his company arrived in January 1865 and had to build dugouts with mud chimneys. He noted these dugouts had been comfortable in the severe cold weather.

On November 11, 1866, the post was renamed Fort Harker. In 1867 this site was abandoned when a new site about a mile to the northeast was chosen for Fort Harker.
