= Bushton, Kansas =

City in Rice County, Kansas

- City
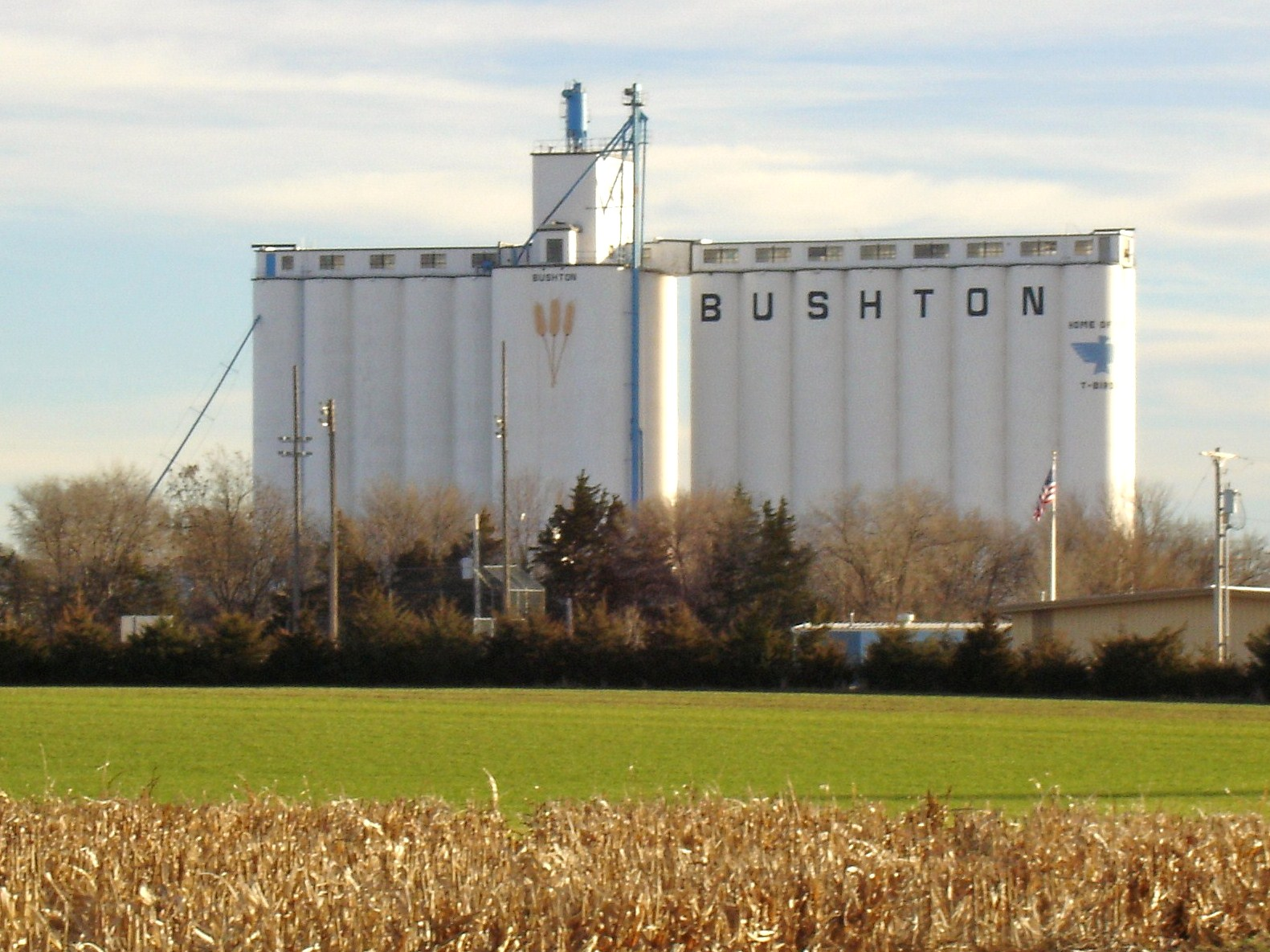
- Grain elevator in Bushton (2004)

- Location within Rice County and Kansas

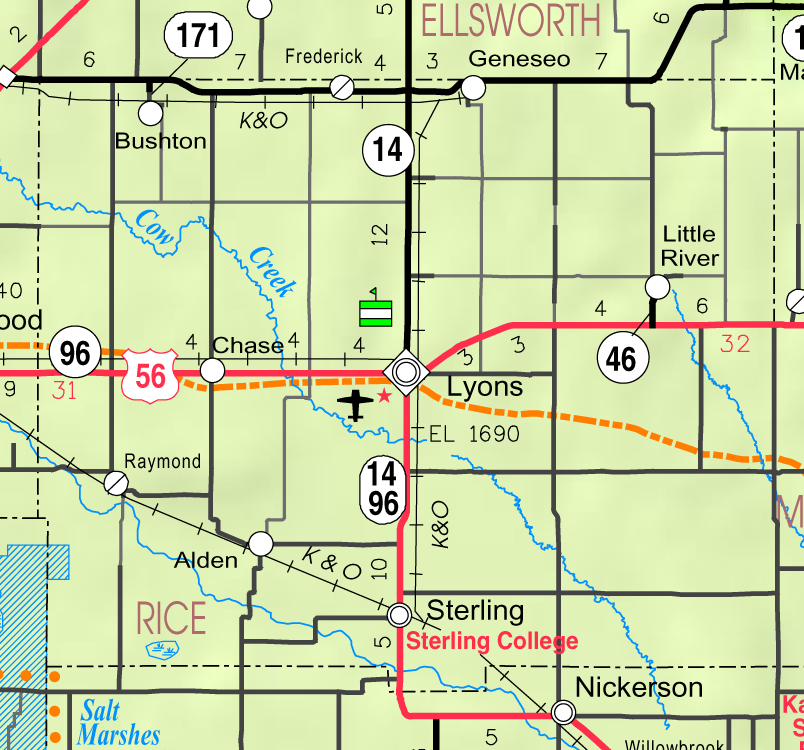
- KDOT map of Rice County (legend)
- Coordinates: 38°30′44″N 98°23′46″W
- Country: United States
- State: Kansas
- County: Rice
- Township: Farmer
- Founded: 1880s
- Incorporated: 1907
- Named for: wild bushes

Area
  - Total: 0.23 sq mi (0.59 km^{2})
  - Land: 0.23 sq mi (0.59 km^{2})
  - Water: 0 sq mi (0.00 km^{2})
- Elevation: 1,768 ft (539 m)

Population (2020)
  - Total: 203
  - Density: 890/sq mi (340/km^{2})
- Time zone: UTC-6 (CST)
  - Summer (DST): UTC-5 (CDT)
- ZIP Code: 67427
- Area code: 620
- FIPS code: 20-09700
- GNIS ID: 2393480

Bushton is a city in Rice County, Kansas, United States. As of the 2020 census, the population of the city was 203.

== History ==
Bushton was originally called Sorghum, and under the latter name established in the early 1880s. It was renamed Bushton in 1887, after a number of wild bushes growing at the town site. Bushton was incorporated in 1907.

== Geography ==
According to the United States Census Bureau, the city has a total area of 0.23 square miles (0.60 km^{2}), all land.

== Demographics ==
Historical population
Census	Pop.	Note	%±
1910	222		—
1920	326		46.8%
1930	325		−0.3%
1940	473		45.5%
1950	532		12.5%
1960	499		−6.2%
1970	397		−20.4%
1980	388		−2.3%
1990	341		−12.1%
2000	314		−7.9%
2010	279		−11.1%
2020	203		−27.2%
U.S. Decennial Census

=== 2020 census ===
The 2020 United States census counted 203 people, 92 households, and 59 families in Bushton. The population density was 890.4 per square mile (343.8/km^{2}). There were 141 housing units at an average density of 618.4 per square mile (238.8/km^{2}). The racial makeup was 87.68% (178) white or European American (82.76% non-Hispanic white), 0.0% (0) black or African-American, 1.48% (3) Native American or Alaska Native, 0.0% (0) Asian, 0.0% (0) Pacific Islander or Native Hawaiian, 0.49% (1) from other races, and 10.34% (21) from two or more races. Hispanic or Latino of any race was 5.91% (12) of the population.

Of the 92 households, 22.8% had children under the age of 18; 53.3% were married couples living together; 20.7% had a female householder with no spouse or partner present. 34.8% of households consisted of individuals and 16.3% had someone living alone who was 65 years of age or older. The average household size was 2.2 and the average family size was 2.8. The percent of those with a bachelor's degree or higher was estimated to be 15.8% of the population.

22.7% of the population was under the age of 18, 3.0% from 18 to 24, 22.7% from 25 to 44, 22.7% from 45 to 64, and 29.1% who were 65 years of age or older. The median age was 48.8 years. For every 100 females, there were 97.1 males. For every 100 females ages 18 and older, there were 96.2 males.

The 2016–2020 5-year American Community Survey estimates show that the median household income was $38,500 (with a margin of error of +/- $22,821) and the median family income was $66,250 (+/- $15,455). Males had a median income of $31,923 (+/- $11,645) versus $19,063 (+/- $14,000) for females. The median income for those above 16 years old was $30,089 (+/- $6,123). Approximately, 18.0% of families and 14.4% of the population were below the poverty line, including 16.3% of those under the age of 18 and 10.8% of those ages 65 or over.

=== 2010 census ===
As of the census of 2010, there were 279 people, 117 households, and 78 families residing in the city. The population density was 1,213.0 inhabitants per square mile (468.3/km^{2}). There were 151 housing units at an average density of 656.5 per square mile (253.5/km^{2}). The racial makeup of the city was 92.5% White, 2.9% African American, 2.5% Native American, 0.4% from other races, and 1.8% from two or more races. Hispanic or Latino of any race were 8.2% of the population.

There were 117 households, of which 23.9% had children under the age of 18 living with them, 53.0% were married couples living together, 8.5% had a female householder with no husband present, 5.1% had a male householder with no wife present, and 33.3% were non-families. 29.1% of all households were made up of individuals, and 8.6% had someone living alone who was 65 years of age or older. The average household size was 2.38 and the average family size was 2.90.

The median age in the city was 42.4 years. 26.9% of residents were under the age of 18; 3.7% were between the ages of 18 and 24; 22.6% were from 25 to 44; 28.7% were from 45 to 64; and 18.3% were 65 years of age or older. The gender makeup of the city was 51.3% male and 48.7% female.

== Economy ==
Oneok Hydrocarbon LP is located east of Bushton, and operates a Helium gas plant at this facility.

== Education ==
The community is served by Central Plains USD 112 public school district. Central Plains Middle School was located in Bushton, but closed in 2019.

School unification consolidated Bushton schools into Quivira Heights schools in the 1980s. The Quivira Heights High School mascot was Thunderbirds. Quivira Heights High School closed in 2012.

Bushton High School was closed through school unification. The Bushton High School mascot was Trojans.

=== Sports ===
The Central Plains Oilers won the Kansas State High School 8-Man DI football championship in 2014.

The Quivira Heights Thunderbirds won the Kansas State High School 8-Man DII football and 1A boys basketball championships in 1983.
