= Frederick, Kansas =

City in Rice County, Kansas

- City
- Location within Rice County and Kansas

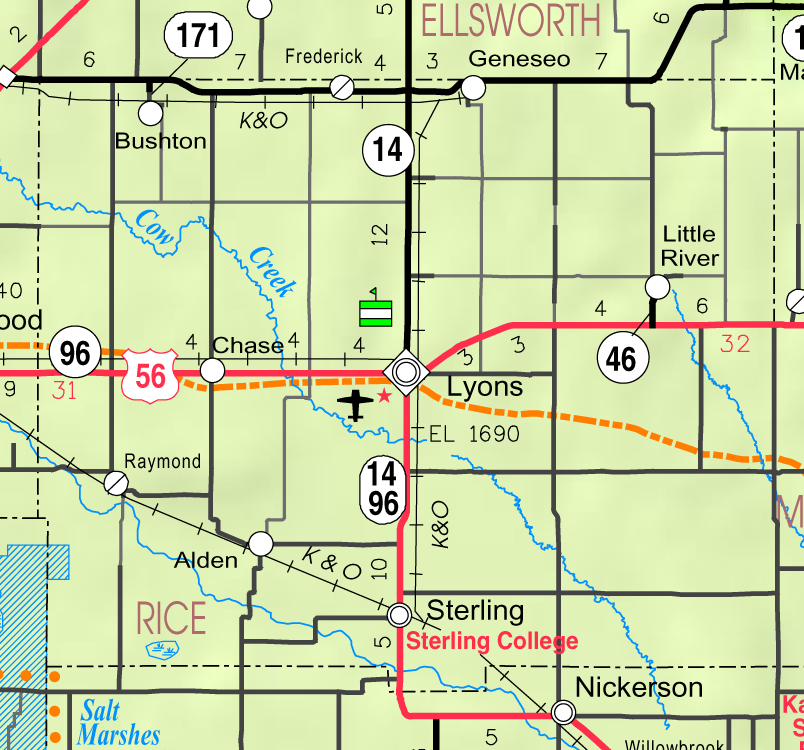
- KDOT map of Rice County (legend)
- Coordinates: 38°30′46″N 98°16′03″W
- Country: United States
- State: Kansas
- County: Rice
- Township: Eureka
- Incorporated: 1909

Area
  - Total: 0.19 sq mi (0.50 km^{2})
  - Land: 0.19 sq mi (0.50 km^{2})
  - Water: 0 sq mi (0.00 km^{2})
- Elevation: 1,762 ft (537 m)

Population (2020)
  - Total: 8
  - Density: 41/sq mi (16/km^{2})
- Time zone: UTC-6 (CST)
  - Summer (DST): UTC-5 (CDT)
- Area code: 620
- FIPS code: 20-24550
- GNIS ID: 2394814

Frederick is a city in Rice County, Kansas, United States. As of the 2020 census, the population of the city was 8.

== History ==
Frederick was incorporated in 1909. It was a shipping point at the junction of the Missouri Pacific and the St. Louis & San Francisco railroads.

A post office was opened in Frederick (also spelled historically Frederic) in 1887, and remained in operation until being discontinued in 1954.

In July 2015, Government officials report considering un-incorporating the city. As of August 2015, for the first time in nearly 130 years, the city doesn't have a city council and no one ran for mayor in April 2015. The future of Frederick is uncertain because Rice County doesn't have the power to unincorporate the city. According to state law, residents must bring a petition to the city council, then a special election will be called for a vote, but since there is no city council, then it is impossible.

In November 2016, the community voted on whether to dissolve Frederick. Election workers at the Eureka Township voting location accidentally gave the wrong ballots to township residents who didn't actually live in Frederick. Twenty people voted, 13 voting to keep the community alive, but at that time, only nine people lived in Frederick. The mistake was caught more than a week after the vote was certified, which was, therefore, after the five-day window to contest a vote, thus Kansas law locked the outcome: Frederick remained a city.

In November 2017, another ballot issue was voted on whether to dissolve the city. The vote was 2-2, short of the 2/3rds required to pass.

== Geography ==
According to the United States Census Bureau, the city has a total area of 0.19 square miles (0.49 km^{2}), all land.

== Demographics ==
Historical population
Census	Pop.	Note	%±
1910	151		—
1920	145		−4.0%
1930	135		−6.9%
1940	84		−37.8%
1950	53		−36.9%
1960	48		−9.4%
1970	39		−18.7%
1980	29		−25.6%
1990	18		−37.9%
2000	11		−38.9%
2010	18		63.6%
2020	8		−55.6%
U.S. Decennial Census

=== 2020 census ===
The 2020 United States census counted 8 people, 4 households, and 2 families in Frederick. The population density was 41.7 per square mile (16.1/km^{2}). There were 9 housing units at an average density of 46.9 per square mile (18.1/km^{2}). The racial makeup was 75.0% (6) white or European American (75.0% non-Hispanic white), 0.0% (0) black or African-American, 0.0% (0) Native American or Alaska Native, 0.0% (0) Asian, 0.0% (0) Pacific Islander or Native Hawaiian, 12.5% (1) from other races, and 12.5% (1) from two or more races. Hispanic or Latino of any race was 25.0% (2) of the population.

Of the 4 households, 25.0% had children under the age of 18; 50.0% were married couples living together; 0.0% had a female householder with no spouse or partner present. 25.0% of households consisted of individuals and 25.0% had someone living alone who was 65 years of age or older. The average household size was 1.9 and the average family size was 1.9. The percent of those with a bachelor's degree or higher was estimated to be 0.0% of the population.

25.0% of the population was under the age of 18, 0.0% from 18 to 24, 37.5% from 25 to 44, 12.5% from 45 to 64, and 25.0% who were 65 years of age or older. The median age was 39.5 years. For every 100 females, there were 700.0 males. For every 100 females ages 18 and older, there were 500.0 males.

The 2016–2020 5-year American Community Survey estimates show that the median household income was $31,250 (with a margin of error of +/- $2,249) and the median family income was $31,250 (+/- $2,249).

=== 2010 census ===
As of the census of 2010, there were 18 people, 8 households, and 6 families residing in the city. The population density was 94.7 inhabitants per square mile (36.6/km^{2}). There were 10 housing units at an average density of 52.6 per square mile (20.3/km^{2}). The racial makeup of the city was 100.0% White.

There were 8 households, of which 25.0% had children under the age of 18 living with them, 75.0% were married couples living together, and 25.0% were non-families. 25.0% of all households were made up of individuals, and 12.5% had someone living alone who was 65 years of age or older. The average household size was 2.25 and the average family size was 2.67.

The median age in the city was 48.5 years. 22.2% of residents were under the age of 18; 0.0% were between the ages of 18 and 24; 22.2% were from 25 to 44; 50.1% were from 45 to 64; and 5.6% were 65 years of age or older. The gender makeup of the city was 50.0% male and 50.0% female.

== Education ==
The community is served by Central Plains USD 112 public school district.
