= Noble Township, Ellsworth County, Kansas =

Noble Township
- Township
- Location in Ellsworth County
- Coordinates: 38°44′25″N 098°25′49″W
- Country: United States
- State: Kansas
- County: Ellsworth

Area
  - Total: 35.74 sq mi (92.56 km^{2})
  - Land: 35.72 sq mi (92.52 km^{2})
  - Water: 0.015 sq mi (0.04 km^{2}) 0.04%
- Elevation: 1,781 ft (543 m)

Population (2020)
  - Total: 104
  - Density: 2.91/sq mi (1.12/km^{2})
- GNIS feature ID: 0475339

Noble Township is a township in Ellsworth County, Kansas, United States. As of the 2020 census, its population was 104.

== Geography ==
Noble Township covers an area of 35.74 square miles (92.6 km^{2}) and contains no incorporated settlements.

The stream of Blood Creek runs through this township.
