= Terra Cotta, Kansas =

- Ghost town
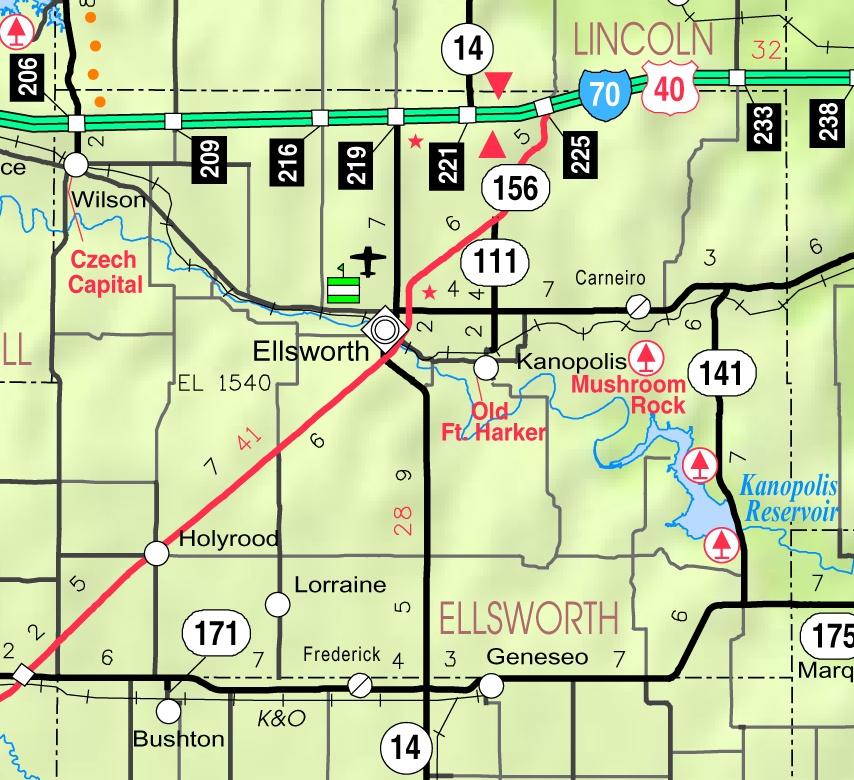
- KDOT map of Ellsworth County (legend)

- Location within the state of Kansas Terra Cotta (the United States)
- Coordinates: 38°44′30″N 97°57′26″W
- Country: United States
- State: Kansas
- County: Ellsworth
- Elevation: 1,473 ft (449 m)

Population
  - Total: 0
- Time zone: UTC-6 (CST)
  - Summer (DST): UTC-5 (CDT)
- Area code: 785
- FIPS code: 20-70175
- GNIS ID: 484797

Terra Cotta is a ghost town in Ellsworth County, Kansas, United States.

== History ==
A post office was opened in Terra Cotta in 1878, and remained in operation until 1913.

Initially a shipping station for sand and clay in 1867, Terra Cotta was named for the red clay in the surrounding hills, "colored earth". The town of 15-20 people added a grocery store, an elevator, a lumber yard, and a hotel. A cheese factory and blacksmith shop were built, but the majority of the population (around 75 at the highest) were farmers and ranchers. The family of Charles Andrew Gill and Sylvania Headley Gill moved to Terra Cotta in the fall of 1880. The obituary of their son Delbert Franklin Gill states that he received his education at the Terra Cotta school. At a convenient location along the Kansas Pacific Railway in 1885, Terra Cotta housed several stockyards. Between 1886 and 1912, more cattle were shipped from Terra Cotta and neighboring Brookville than from any other place between Kansas City and Denver.

A series of hardships sealed the fate of this small town. The hotel was burned down by wildfire in 1887. A local recession drove many families and businesses away the next year. Although in population decline, the Union Pacific Railway built a new depot in 1900. By 1910, only 20 people lived in the town, and the post office closed in 1913.

Today, only the railroad tracks remain of the townsite, as the depot was moved to Ellsworth as part of a museum complex.

== See also ==
- Kanopolis Lake
- Kanopolis State Park
- Mushroom Rock State Park
