= Perry Hodgden House =

- U.S. National Register of Historic Places
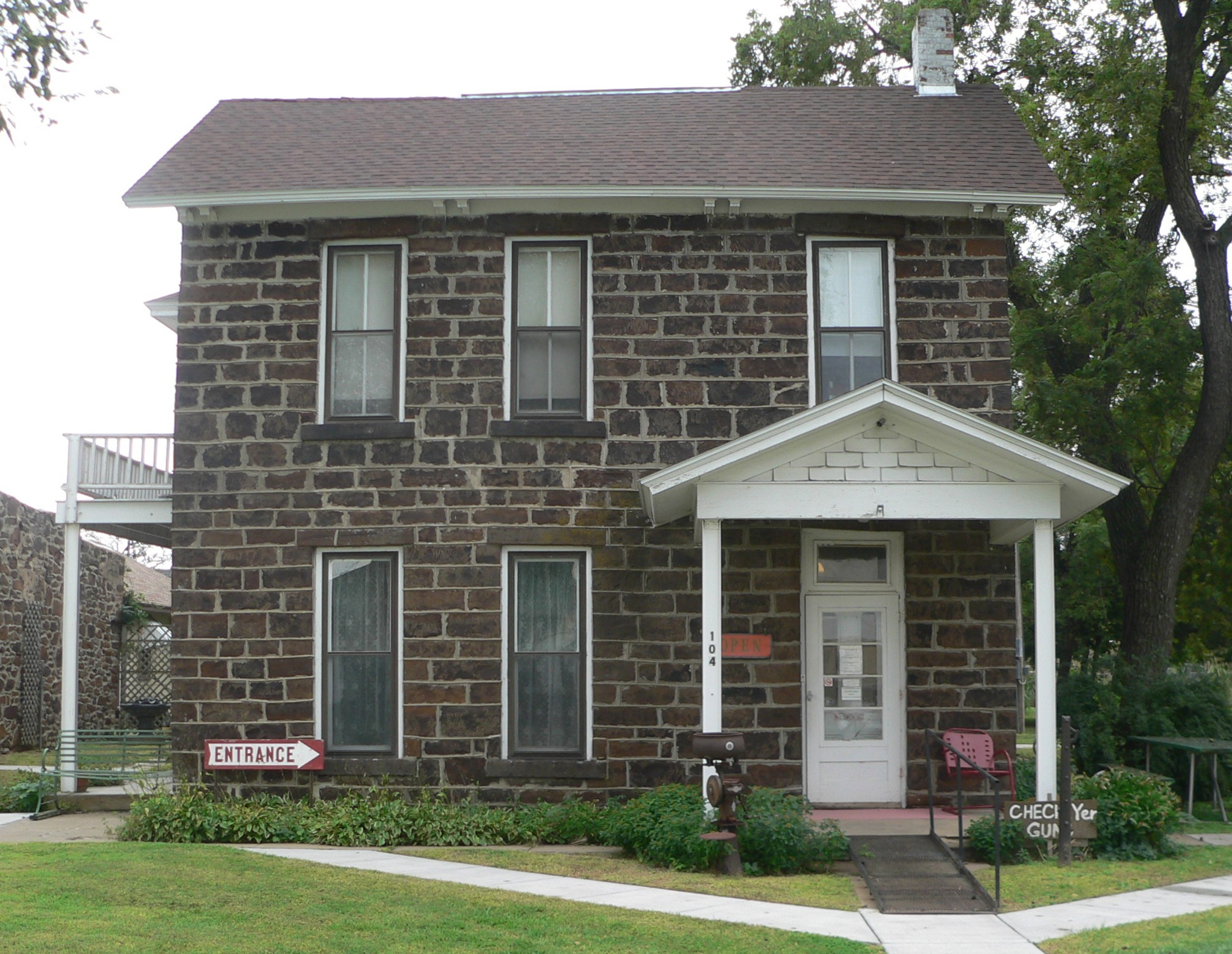

- Location within Kansas
- Location: 104 W. Main St., Ellsworth, Kansas
- Coordinates: 38.72826°N 98.23277°W
- Area: less than one acre
- Built: 1877
- NRHP reference No.: 73000754
- Added to NRHP: January 29, 1973

The Perry Hodgden House, at 104 W. Main St. in Ellsworth, Kansas, was listed on the National Register of Historic Places in 1973.

The original portion of the house, built in 1877, is a stone building about 30 by 20 feet (9.1 m × 6.1 m) in plan. It was one of the first stone houses in Ellsworth County, Kansas. An addition in the 1880s added about 30 by 35 feet (9.1 m × 10.7 m).

Perry Hodgden arrived in Ellsworth in 1867 and helped build the community. He operated a dry-goods store, served as postmaster for a period, and was treasurer of the Ellsworth Town Company. Aside from that, he operated or invested in a livery stable, was active in the city council, and organized the County Agricultural Society. In 1871, he bought the lot and in subsequent years bought more lots adjacent. After frame buildings were destroyed in Ellsworth in the 1874 and 1876 fires, he proceeded with stone construction.

The house was deemed "of local historic importance to the Ellsworth community because of the contributions of Perry Hodgden to the growth and development of the community."

The house is now part of a museum of the Ellsworth County Historical Society, named the Hodgden House Museum Complex, which also includes displays in a large historic stone stable. The society also operates the Fort Harker Guardhouse Museum Complex in Kanopolis, Kansas.
