= Crawford, Kansas =

- Ghost town
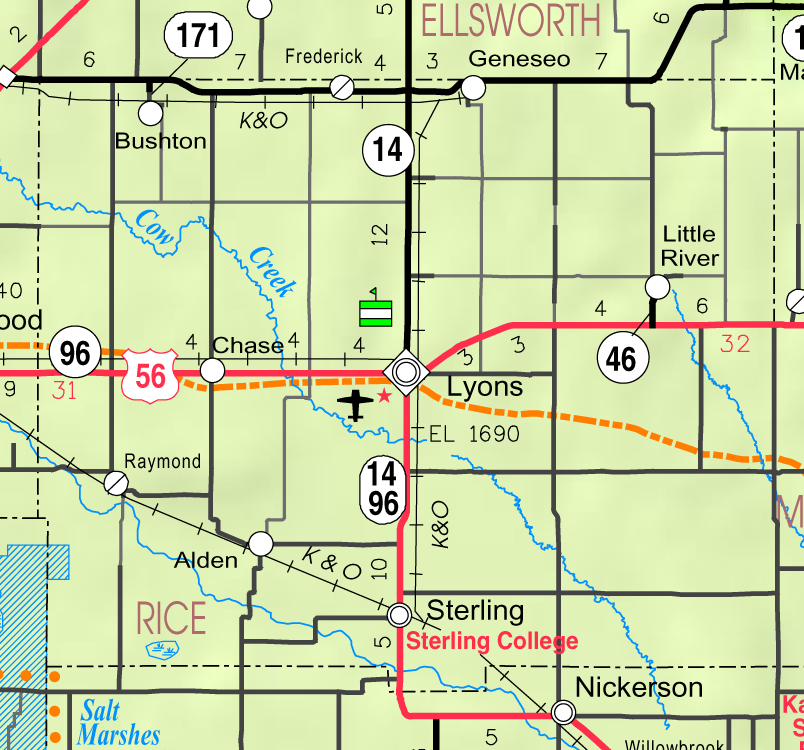
- KDOT map of Rice County (legend)

- Location within Kansas Location within the United States
- Coordinates: 38°30′48″N 98°2′6″W
- Country: United States
- State: Kansas
- County: Rice
- Township: Galt
- Elevation: 1,690 ft (520 m)

Population
  - Total: 0
- Time zone: UTC-6 (CST)
  - Summer (DST): UTC-5 (CDT)
- Area code: 620
- FIPS code: 20-16275
- GNIS ID: 484739

Crawford is a ghost town in Galt and Odessa Townships in Rice County, Kansas, United States. It lies along K-4 about 6 miles (9.7 km) east of Geneseo.

== History ==
For millennia, the land now known as Kansas was inhabited by Native Americans. In 1803, most of modern Kansas was secured by the United States as part of the Louisiana Purchase. In 1854, the Kansas Territory was organized, then in 1861 Kansas became the 34th U.S. state. In 1867, Rice County was founded.

Crawford had a post office from the 1880s until 1953.
