= Lincoln Township, Rice County, Kansas =

Township in Rice County, Kansas, U.S.

Lincoln Township
- Township
- Location within Rice County
- Coordinates: 38.3800°N 98.3134°W
- Country: United States
- State: Kansas
- County: Rice
- Established: 1879

Government
  - District 1 County Commissioner: Derek McCloud

Area
  - Total: 36.583 sq mi (94.75 km^{2})
  - Land: 36.583 sq mi (94.75 km^{2})
  - Water: 0 sq mi (0 km^{2}) 0%

Population (2020)
  - Total: 450
  - Density: 12/sq mi (4.7/km^{2})
- Time zone: UTC-6 (CST)
  - Summer (DST): UTC-5 (CDT)
- Area code: 620
- GNIS feature ID: 475672

Lincoln Township is a township in Rice County, Kansas, United States. As of the 2020 census, its population was 450.

== History ==
Lincoln Township was established in 1879. Lincoln Township was originally part of Farmer Township before being split off.

== Geography ==
Lincoln Township covers an area of 36.583 square miles (94.75 square kilometers).

=== Communities ===
- Chase

=== Adjacent townships ===
Eureka Township, Rice County
Farmer Township, Rice County	northwest	north	northeast	Victoria Township, Rice County
Pioneer Township, Rice County	west	self	east	Harrison Township, Rice County
Raymond Township, Rice County	southwest	south	southeast	Atlanta Township, Rice County
Center Township, Rice County

== Transportation ==
=== Major highways ===
- US-56
- K-96
