= Valley Township, Ellsworth County, Kansas =

Valley Township
- Township
- Location in Ellsworth County
- Coordinates: 38°33′56″N 098°25′29″W
- Country: United States
- State: Kansas
- County: Ellsworth

Area
  - Total: 35.98 sq mi (93.19 km^{2})
  - Land: 35.93 sq mi (93.06 km^{2})
  - Water: 0.050 sq mi (0.13 km^{2}) 0.14%
- Elevation: 1,827 ft (557 m)

Population (2020)
  - Total: 481
  - Density: 13.4/sq mi (5.17/km^{2})
- GNIS feature ID: 0475541

Valley Township is a township in Ellsworth County, Kansas, United States. As of the 2020 census, its population was 481.

== Geography ==
Valley Township covers an area of 35.98 square miles (93.2 km^{2}) and contains one incorporated settlement, Holyrood.

== Transportation ==
Valley Township contains one airport or landing strip, Holyrood Municipal Airport.
