= Ellsworth County, Kansas =

County in Kansas, United States

- County
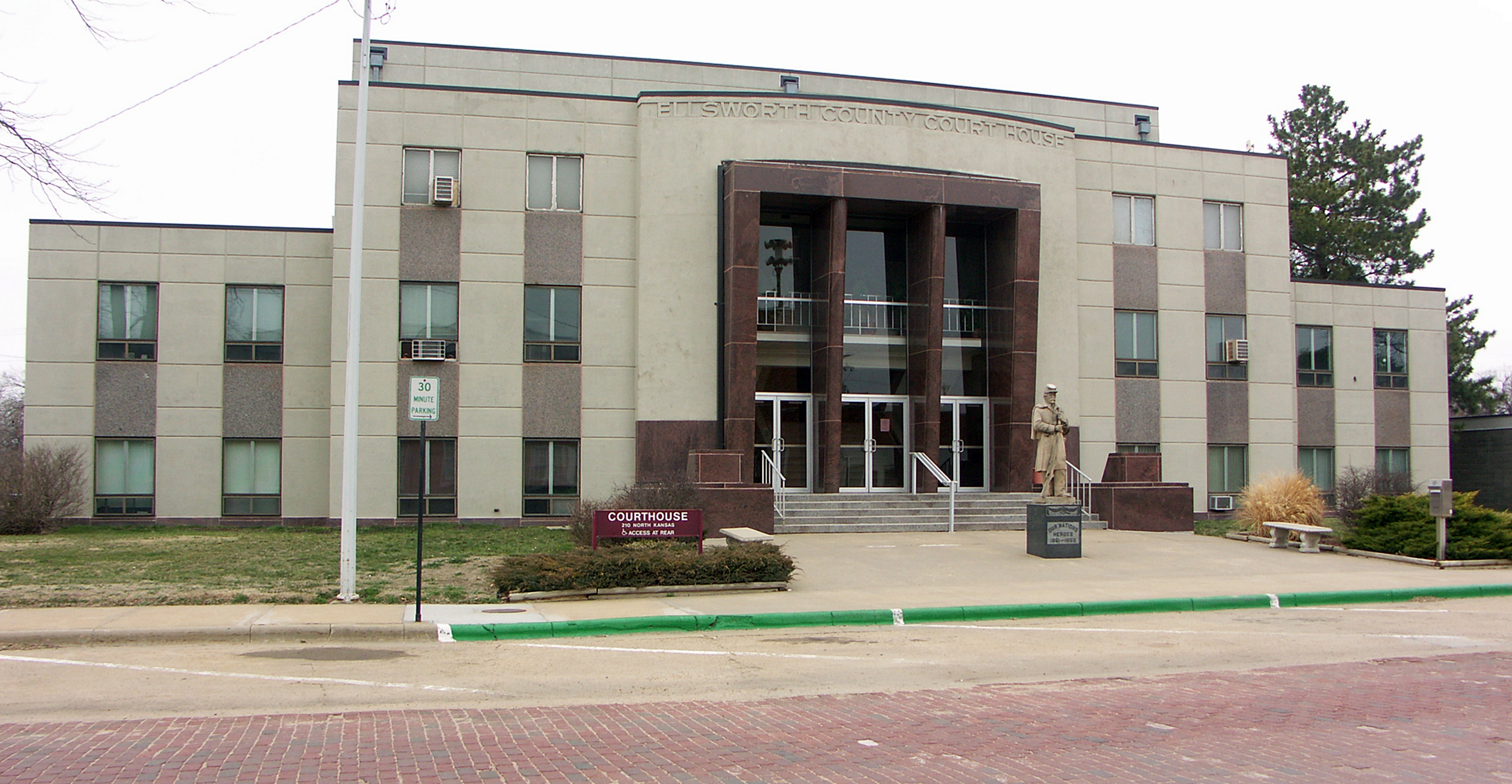
- Ellsworth County Courthouse in Ellsworth (2013)

- Location within the U.S. state of Kansas
- Country: United States
- State: Kansas
- Founded: February 26, 1867
- Named for: Fort Ellsworth
- Seat: Ellsworth
- Largest city: Ellsworth

Area
  - Total: 723 sq mi (1,870 km^{2})
  - Land: 716 sq mi (1,850 km^{2})
  - Water: 7.4 sq mi (19 km^{2}) 1.0%

Population (2020)
  - Total: 6,376
  - Estimate (2025): 6,257 ▼
  - Density: 8.9/sq mi (3.4/km^{2})
- Time zone: UTC−6 (Central)
  - Summer (DST): UTC−5 (CDT)
- Area code: 785
- Congressional district: 1st
- Website: ellsworthcounty.org

Ellsworth County is a county located in the U.S. state of Kansas. Its county seat and most populous city is Ellsworth. As of the 2020 census, the county population was 6,376. The county was named after Fort Ellsworth.

== History ==
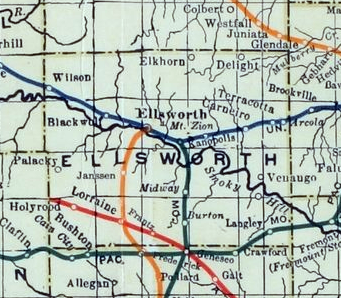
1915-1918 Railroad Map of Ellsworth County

=== Early history ===
From the 16th century to 18th century, the Kingdom of France claimed ownership of large parts of North America both east and west of the Mississippi River. In 1762, after losing the French and Indian War to Great Britain, France secretly ceded New France to Spain, per the Treaty of Fontainebleau. In 1763 France ceded its territories east of the Mississippi River to Great Britain.

It regained the western territory under Napoleon, who sold it in 1803 to the United States in the Louisiana Purchase. He had decided to get rid of the New World territories after failing to regain control of Saint-Domingue, where a slave rebellion had toppled colonial control. In 1804 Haiti declared independence as the second republic of the Western Hemisphere.

The Plains Indians retained control of much of their territory until the late 19th century, giving way finally before superior United States arms and technology. Their territories were invaded by settlers, and crossed by the development of improved routes for settlers' emigrant wagon trains to the West Coast, followed by more permanent construction of transcontinental railroads. These brought tens of thousands of settlers to the Plains.

=== 19th century ===
In 1802, Spain returned most of the land to France, but keeping title to about 7,500 square miles. In 1803, most of the land for modern day Kansas was acquired by the United States from France as part of the 828,000 square mile Louisiana Purchase for 2.83 cents per acre.

In 1854, the Kansas Territory was organized; and in 1861 Kansas became the 34th U.S. state. Ellsworth County was established February 26, 1867. The county was named after the old Fort Ellsworth, named in honor of 2nd Lieutenant Allen Ellsworth of the 7th Iowa Cavalry (Company H), who supervised construction of the fort in 1864 during the American Civil War. On November 17, 1866, the fort was renamed Fort Harker in honor of General Charles Garrison Harker who had died on June 27, 1864, from wounds received in an abortive offensive action in the Battle of Kennesaw Mountain. The fort was subsequently moved to a new site about one mile to the northeast, and the old fort's remaining buildings were ordered torn down in June 1867.

On March 22, 1869, Fourteen Pawnee Indians, including scouts who had been honorably discharged after working for the army, were traveling through Ellsworth County when they ran into U.S. cavalry troops. Though the Pawnees had discharge papers from the army, a fight ensued. The Indians retreated to a sandstone cave, known today as Palmer's Cave. Their attackers set fire to grass at the cave's entrance, and six to nine Pawnees were killed as they ran out. The others died from exposure without their possessions. A few days later, the post surgeon at nearby Fort Harker, in today's town of Kanopolis, removed six heads from their bodies, and shipped them to the Army Medical Museum in Washington, D.C., for cranial study.

In the later 19th century, this area became known for cattle ranching and cattle drives. Town life was often riotous with cowboys celebrating after long drives.

== Geography ==
According to the U.S. Census Bureau, the county has a total area of 723 square miles (1,870 km^{2}), of which 716 square miles (1,850 km^{2}) is land and 7.4 square miles (19 km^{2}) (1.0%) is water. It is intersected by the Smoky Hill River.

=== Adjacent counties ===
- Lincoln County (north)
- Saline County (east)
- McPherson County (southeast)
- Rice County (south)
- Barton County (southwest)
- Russell County (northwest)

== Demographics ==
Historical population
Census	Pop.	Note	%±
1870	1,185		—
1880	8,494		616.8%
1890	9,272		9.2%
1900	9,626		3.8%
1910	10,444		8.5%
1920	10,379		−0.6%
1930	10,132		−2.4%
1940	9,855		−2.7%
1950	8,465		−14.1%
1960	7,677		−9.3%
1970	6,146		−19.9%
1980	6,640		8.0%
1990	6,586		−0.8%
2000	6,525		−0.9%
2010	6,497		−0.4%
2020	6,376		−1.9%
2025 (est.)	6,257	▼	−1.9%
U.S. Decennial Census; 1790-1960 1900-1990; 1990-2000 2010-2020

=== Racial and ethnic composition ===
Ellsworth County, Kansas – Racial and ethnic composition Note: the US Census treats Hispanic/Latino as an ethnic category. This table excludes Latinos from the racial categories and assigns them to a separate category. Hispanics/Latinos may be of any race.
Race / Ethnicity (NH = Non-Hispanic)	Pop 1980	Pop 1990	Pop 2000	Pop 2010	Pop 2020	% 1980	% 1990	% 2000	% 2010	% 2020
White alone (NH)	6,427	6,233	5,954	5,733	5,455	96.79%	94.64%	91.25%	88.24%	85.56%
Black or African American alone (NH)	3	134	227	299	254	0.05%	2.03%	3.48%	4.60%	3.98%
Native American or Alaska Native alone (NH)	10	21	25	32	39	0.15%	0.32%	0.38%	0.49%	0.61%
Asian alone (NH)	8	10	16	24	23	0.12%	0.15%	0.25%	0.37%	0.36%
Native Hawaiian or Pacific Islander alone (NH)	x	x	1	0	0	x	x	0.02%	0.00%	0.00%
Other race alone (NH)	0	2	4	4	8	0.00%	0.03%	0.06%	0.06%	0.13%
Mixed race or Multiracial (NH)	x	x	64	83	232	x	x	0.98%	1.28%	3.64%
Hispanic or Latino (any race)	192	186	234	322	365	2.89%	2.82%	3.59%	4.96%	5.72%
Total	6,640	6,586	6,525	6,497	6,376	100.00%	100.00%	100.00%	100.00%	100.00%

=== 2020 census ===
As of the 2020 census, the county had a population of 6,376 and a median age of 43.8 years. Residents under 18 accounted for 18.8% of the population while 22.8% were 65 years of age or older. For every 100 females there were 129.5 males, and for every 100 females age 18 and over there were 138.4 males age 18 and over.

None of the county's residents lived in urban areas, while 100.0% lived in rural areas.

The racial makeup of the county was 88.7% White, 4.0% Black or African American, 0.8% American Indian and Alaska Native, 0.5% Asian, 0.0% Native Hawaiian and Pacific Islander, 1.0% from some other race, and 5.0% from two or more races. Hispanic or Latino residents of any race comprised 5.7% of the population.

There were 2,352 households in the county, of which 25.0% had children under the age of 18 living with them and 24.7% had a female householder with no spouse or partner present. About 35.3% of all households were made up of individuals and 16.6% had someone living alone who was 65 years of age or older.

There were 3,080 housing units, of which 23.6% were vacant. Among occupied housing units, 76.4% were owner-occupied and 23.6% were renter-occupied. The homeowner vacancy rate was 2.2% and the rental vacancy rate was 14.0%.

=== 2000 census ===
As of the 2000 census, there were 6,525 people, 2,481 households, and 1,639 families residing in the county. The population density was 9 people per square mile (3.5 people/km^{2}). There were 3,228 housing units at an average density of 4 per square mile (1.5/km^{2}). The racial makeup of the county was 93.67% White, 3.56% Black or African American, 0.48% Native American, 0.25% Asian, 0.02% Pacific Islander, 0.86% from other races, and 1.18% from two or more races. Hispanic or Latino of any race were 3.59% of the population.

There were 2,481 households, out of which 27.90% had children under the age of 18 living with them, 57.20% were married couples living together, 6.20% had a female householder with no husband present, and 33.90% were non-families. 31.40% of all households were made up of individuals, and 17.30% had someone living alone who was 65 years of age or older. The average household size was 2.30 and the average family size was 2.88.

In the county, the population was spread out, with 21.40% under the age of 18, 7.30% from 18 to 24, 27.10% from 25 to 44, 23.80% from 45 to 64, and 20.40% who were 65 years of age or older. The median age was 42 years. For every 100 females there were 111.90 males. For every 100 females age 18 and over, there were 114.10 males.

The median income for a household in the county was $35,772, and the median income for a family was $44,360. Males had a median income of $30,110 versus $20,486 for females. The per capita income for the county was $16,569. About 4.00% of families and 7.20% of the population were below the poverty line, including 7.50% of those under age 18 and 11.10% of those age 65 or over.

== Government ==
=== Presidential elections ===
Presidential election results

United States presidential election results for Ellsworth County, Kansas
Year	Republican		Democratic		Third party(ies)	
Year	No.	%	No.	%	No.	%
1888	1,159	56.51%	831	40.52%	61	2.97%
1892	1,102	49.80%	0	0.00%	1,111	50.20%
1896	1,048	50.92%	992	48.20%	18	0.87%
1900	1,333	56.68%	1,006	42.77%	13	0.55%
1904	1,359	68.43%	578	29.10%	49	2.47%
1908	1,213	52.95%	1,039	45.35%	39	1.70%
1912	353	15.33%	1,045	45.38%	905	39.30%
1916	1,945	48.33%	1,936	48.11%	143	3.55%
1920	2,264	65.60%	1,090	31.59%	97	2.81%
1924	2,286	58.77%	950	24.42%	654	16.81%
1928	2,450	60.23%	1,588	39.04%	30	0.74%
1932	1,607	34.95%	2,928	63.68%	63	1.37%
1936	2,058	40.71%	2,990	59.15%	7	0.14%
1940	2,658	54.13%	2,237	45.56%	15	0.31%
1944	2,290	57.62%	1,678	42.22%	6	0.15%
1948	2,155	52.83%	1,879	46.07%	45	1.10%
1952	3,219	74.67%	1,068	24.77%	24	0.56%
1956	2,524	64.90%	1,351	34.74%	14	0.36%
1960	2,189	59.37%	1,488	40.36%	10	0.27%
1964	1,406	39.75%	2,118	59.88%	13	0.37%
1968	1,776	57.53%	1,060	34.34%	251	8.13%
1972	2,087	65.20%	1,028	32.11%	86	2.69%
1976	1,618	49.85%	1,573	48.46%	55	1.69%
1980	2,155	65.90%	886	27.09%	229	7.00%
1984	2,353	71.35%	905	27.44%	40	1.21%
1988	1,711	57.03%	1,219	40.63%	70	2.33%
1992	1,197	36.96%	1,010	31.18%	1,032	31.86%
1996	2,078	64.14%	899	27.75%	263	8.12%
2000	1,845	64.99%	825	29.06%	169	5.95%
2004	2,259	72.82%	801	25.82%	42	1.35%
2008	2,021	68.79%	851	28.97%	66	2.25%
2012	1,930	71.17%	702	25.88%	80	2.95%
2016	1,969	73.50%	521	19.45%	189	7.05%
2020	2,148	75.29%	648	22.71%	57	2.00%
2024	2,078	75.34%	636	23.06%	44	1.60%

=== Laws ===
Ellsworth County was a prohibition, or "dry", county until the Kansas Constitution was amended in 1986. Voters approved the sale of alcoholic liquor by the individual drink, with a 30% food sales requirement.

== Education ==
=== Unified school districts ===
- Central Plains USD 112
- Ellsworth USD 327

== Communities ==
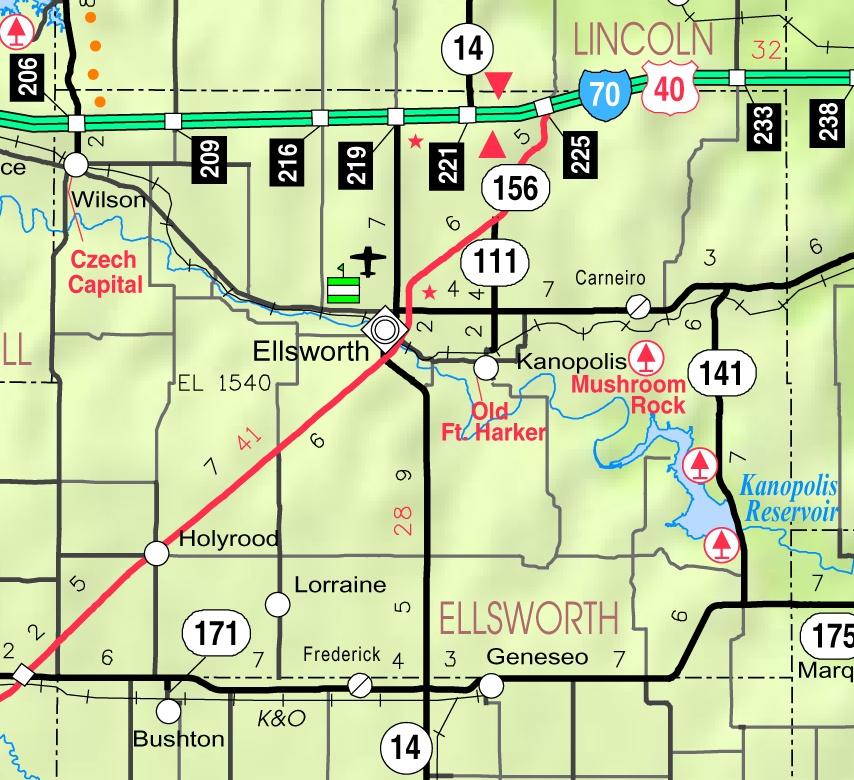
2005 map of Ellsworth County (map legend)

List of townships / incorporated cities / unincorporated communities / extinct former communities within Ellsworth County.

=== Cities ===
- Ellsworth (county seat)
- Wilson
- Kanopolis
- Holyrood
- Lorraine

=== Unincorporated communities ===
- Black Wolf
- Carneiro
- Delight
- Elkhorn
- Langley
- Venango
- Yankee Run

=== Ghost towns ===
- Arcola
- Frantz
- Midway
- Terra Cotta

=== Townships ===
Ellsworth County is divided into nineteen townships. The city of Ellsworth is considered governmentally independent and is excluded from the census figures for the townships. In the following table, the population center is the largest city (or cities) included in that township's population total, if it is of a significant size.

Township	FIPS	Population center	Population	Population density /km^{2} (/sq mi)	Land area km^{2} (sq mi)	Water area km^{2} (sq mi)	Water %	Geographic coordinates
Ash Creek	02575		58	1 (2)	93 (36)	0 (0)	0.51%	38°39′17″N 98°12′47″W
Black Wolf	07025		87	1 (2)	94 (36)	0 (0)	0.10%	38°44′40″N 98°19′33″W
Carneiro	10800		57	1 (2)	93 (36)	0 (0)	0.36%	38°45′2″N 97°59′46″W
Clear Creek	13725		91	1 (3)	94 (36)	0 (0)	0.17%	38°44′10″N 98°6′16″W
Columbia	15025		60	1 (2)	94 (36)	0 (0)	0.04%	38°50′5″N 98°18′50″W
Ellsworth	20525		797	9 (23)	88 (34)	0 (0)	0.23%	38°43′6″N 98°10′58″W
Empire	21150		174	1 (3)	171 (66)	14 (6)	7.79%	38°39′6″N 98°1′7″W
Garfield	25575		27	0 (1)	92 (36)	0 (0)	0.30%	38°50′9″N 98°6′42″W
Green Garden	28600	Lorraine	211	2 (6)	94 (36)	0 (0)	0.22%	38°33′30″N 98°19′19″W
Langley	38600		76	1 (2)	92 (35)	2 (1)	1.86%	38°35′33″N 97°58′15″W
Lincoln	40675		62	1 (2)	95 (37)	0 (0)	0.22%	38°39′8″N 98°18′0″W
Mulberry	49050		44	0 (1)	93 (36)	0 (0)	0.24%	38°50′5″N 97°58′28″W
Noble	50825		90	1 (3)	93 (36)	0 (0)	0.04%	38°44′51″N 98°25′33″W
Palacky	54100		63	1 (2)	94 (36)	0 (0)	0.08%	38°38′51″N 98°25′56″W
Sherman	64950		65	1 (2)	94 (36)	0 (0)	0.22%	38°49′21″N 98°13′7″W
Thomas	70450		72	1 (2)	93 (36)	0 (0)	0.21%	38°33′56″N 98°11′33″W
Trivoli	71525		55	1 (2)	93 (36)	0 (0)	0.38%	38°35′7″N 98°4′23″W
Valley	72800	Holyrood	577	6 (16)	93 (36)	0 (0)	0.14%	38°34′22″N 98°24′56″W
Wilson	79700	Wilson	894	10 (25)	93 (36)	0 (0)	0.06%	38°49′34″N 98°27′23″W
Sources: "Census 2000 U.S. Gazetteer Files". U.S. Census Bureau, Geography Division. Archived from the original on August 2, 2002.

== See also ==
- Faris Caves
- Kanopolis Drive-in Theatre
- Kanopolis State Park and Kanopolis Lake
- Mushroom Rock State Park
- National Register of Historic Places listings in Ellsworth County, Kansas

Community information for Kansas

- Kansas locations by per capita income
- List of counties in Kansas
- List of townships in Kansas
- List of cities in Kansas
- List of unincorporated communities in Kansas
- List of ghost towns in Kansas
