= Empire Township, Ellsworth County, Kansas =

Empire Township
- Township
- Location in Ellsworth County
- Coordinates: 38°39′12″N 098°02′09″W
- Country: United States
- State: Kansas
- County: Ellsworth

Area
  - Total: 71.81 sq mi (185.98 km^{2})
  - Land: 66.21 sq mi (171.49 km^{2})
  - Water: 5.59 sq mi (14.49 km^{2}) 7.79%
- Elevation: 1,506 ft (459 m)

Population (2020)
  - Total: 142
  - Density: 2.14/sq mi (0.828/km^{2})
- GNIS feature ID: 0475469

Empire Township is a township in Ellsworth County, Kansas, United States. As of the 2020 census, its population was 142.

== Geography ==
Empire Township covers an area of 71.81 square miles (186.0 km^{2}) and contains no incorporated settlements. According to the USGS, it contains two cemeteries: Buckeye and Scates.

The streams of Alum Creek, Bluff Creek, Clear Creek, Sand Creek, Skunk Creek and Thompson Creek run through this township.

== Transportation ==
Empire Township contains one airport or landing strip, Kanopolis State Park Airport.
