= Lorraine, Kansas =

City in Ellsworth County, Kansas

- City
- Location within County and Kansas

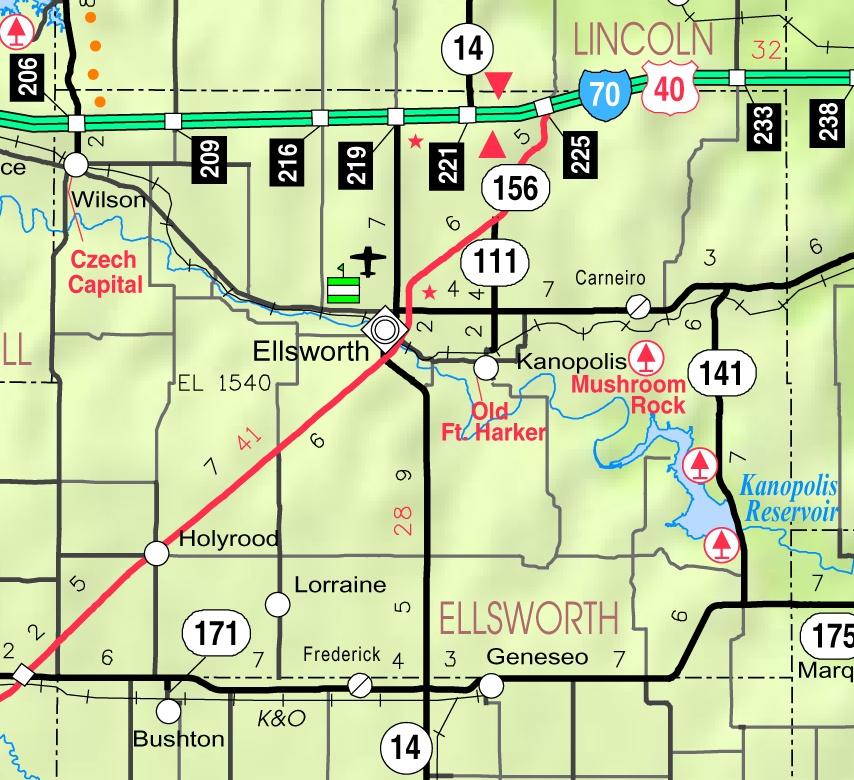
- KDOT map of Ellsworth County (legend)
- Coordinates: 38°34′09″N 98°19′02″W
- Country: United States
- State: Kansas
- County: Ellsworth
- Founded: 1888
- Incorporated: 1923

Government
  - Mayor: Kimberly Travnichek

Area
  - Total: 0.25 sq mi (0.65 km^{2})
  - Land: 0.25 sq mi (0.65 km^{2})
  - Water: 0 sq mi (0.00 km^{2})
- Elevation: 1,791 ft (546 m)

Population (2020)
  - Total: 137
  - Density: 550/sq mi (210/km^{2})
- Time zone: UTC-6 (CST)
  - Summer (DST): UTC-5 (CDT)
- ZIP Code: 67459
- Area code: 785
- FIPS code: 20-42800
- GNIS ID: 2395766
- Website: www.lorraineks.com

Lorraine is a city in Ellsworth County, Kansas, United States. As of the 2020 census, the population of the city was 137.

== History ==
Lorraine was founded in 1888.

Lorraine was incorporated on June 13, 1923 as a third-class city of Kansas.

The first post office in Lorraine was established in February 1888.

== Geography ==
According to the United States Census Bureau, the city has a total area of 0.25 square miles (0.65 km^{2}), all land.

== Demographics ==
Historical population
Census	Pop.	Note	%±
1930	177		—
1940	236		33.3%
1950	195		−17.4%
1960	157		−19.5%
1970	153		−2.5%
1980	157		2.6%
1990	147		−6.4%
2000	136		−7.5%
2010	138		1.5%
2020	137		−0.7%
U.S. Decennial Census

=== 2020 census ===
The 2020 United States census counted 137 people, 53 households, and 34 families in Lorraine. The population density was 541.5 per square mile (209.1/km^{2}). There were 61 housing units at an average density of 241.1 per square mile (93.1/km^{2}). The racial makeup was 78.83% (108) white or European American (75.91% non-Hispanic white), 2.19% (3) black or African-American, 2.19% (3) Native American or Alaska Native, 2.92% (4) Asian, 0.0% (0) Pacific Islander or Native Hawaiian, 3.65% (5) from other races, and 10.22% (14) from two or more races. Hispanic or Latino of any race was 10.95% (15) of the population.

Of the 53 households, 45.3% had children under the age of 18; 49.1% were married couples living together; 15.1% had a female householder with no spouse or partner present. 30.2% of households consisted of individuals and 9.4% had someone living alone who was 65 years of age or older. The average household size was 2.7 and the average family size was 4.0. The percent of those with a bachelor's degree or higher was estimated to be 13.1% of the population.

32.8% of the population was under the age of 18, 10.2% from 18 to 24, 30.7% from 25 to 44, 13.1% from 45 to 64, and 13.1% who were 65 years of age or older. The median age was 30.3 years. For every 100 females, there were 90.3 males. For every 100 females ages 18 and older, there were 91.7 males.

The 2016–2020 5-year American Community Survey estimates show that the median household income was $41,875 (with a margin of error of +/- $28,258) and the median family income was $64,688 (+/- $36,077). Males had a median income of $47,500 (+/- $16,219). The median income for those above 16 years old was $39,375 (+/- $19,383). Approximately, 0.0% of families and 3.6% of the population were below the poverty line, including 0.0% of those under the age of 18 and 0.0% of those ages 65 or over.

=== 2010 census ===
As of the census of 2010, there were 138 people, 47 households, and 40 families residing in the city. The population density was 552.0 inhabitants per square mile (213.1/km^{2}). There were 65 housing units at an average density of 260.0 per square mile (100.4/km^{2}). The racial makeup of the city was 93.5% White, 0.7% Native American, 1.4% from other races, and 4.3% from two or more races. Hispanic or Latino of any race were 11.6% of the population.

There were 47 households, of which 36.2% had children under the age of 18 living with them, 74.5% were married couples living together, 8.5% had a female householder with no husband present, 2.1% had a male householder with no wife present, and 14.9% were non-families. 8.5% of all households were made up of individuals. The average household size was 2.94 and the average family size was 3.10.

The median age in the city was 40.5 years. 30.4% of residents were under the age of 18; 5.7% were between the ages of 18 and 24; 17.3% were from 25 to 44; 30.4% were from 45 to 64; and 15.9% were 65 years of age or older. The gender makeup of the city was 52.2% male and 47.8% female.

== Government ==
The Lorraine government consists of a mayor and five council members. The council meets the second Tuesday of each month at 7 PM.

- City Hall, 238 Main St.

== Education ==
The community is served by Central Plains USD 112 public school district. The Central Plains High School mascot is Central Plains Oilers. The Oilers won the Kansas State High School 8-Man DII football championship in 2014.

Lorraine schools were closed through school unification. The Lorraine High School mascot was Lorraine Huskies.

== Transportation ==
The Atchison, Topeka and Santa Fe Railway formerly provided mixed train service to Lorraine on a line between Little River and Galatia until at least 1961. As of 2025, the nearest passenger rail station is located in Hutchinson, where Amtrak's Southwest Chief stops once daily on a route from Chicago to Los Angeles.
