= Central Plains USD 112 =

Public school district in Holyrood, Kansas

Address
- 406 Main St. Claflin, Kansas, 67525; United States

District information
- Type: Public
- Grades: K to 12
- Schools: 3*

Other information
- Website: usd112.org

Central Plains Junior-Senior High School

Location
- 700 West Albro Street; Claflin, (Barton County), Kansas 67525; United States; 38.525724°N 98.541561°W

Information
- Type: Public high school
- Principal: Jessica Murphy
- Staff: 14.20 (FTE)
- Enrollment: 141 (2023-24)
- Student to teacher ratio: 9.93
- Colors: Green, black and silver
- Nickname: Oilers
- Website: Central Plains Junior-Senior High School

Central Plains USD 112 is a public unified school district (USD) headquartered in Claflin, Kansas, United States. The district includes the communities of Holyrood, Bushton, Claflin, Dorrance, Frederick, Lorraine, Wilson, Beaver, Dubuque, Odin, Hitschmann, and nearby rural areas.

== Schools ==
The school district operates the following schools:

- Central Plains Jr/Sr High School in Claflin
- Central Plains Elementary School in Holyrood
- Wilson Elementary School in Wilson

Closed schools

- Wilson Jr/Sr High School in Wilson, closing in spring 2023

== History ==
The USD was formed in 2010 from the merger of Lorraine USD 328 and Claflin USD 354.

In January 2023, the district decided to close the Wilson Jr/Sr High School.

In May 2023, members of the community petitioned to dissolve the district. An election was held August 1 to decide the fate of the school district, where approximately two-thirds voted to not dissolve the district.

== See also ==
- Kansas State Department of Education
- Kansas State High School Activities Association
- List of high schools in Kansas
- List of unified school districts in Kansas
