= Palacky Township, Kansas =

Palacky Township
- Township
- Location in Ellsworth County
- Coordinates: 38°39′08″N 098°25′29″W
- Country: United States
- State: Kansas
- County: Ellsworth

Area
  - Total: 36.43 sq mi (94.35 km^{2})
  - Land: 36.40 sq mi (94.27 km^{2})
  - Water: 0.031 sq mi (0.08 km^{2}) 0.08%
- Elevation: 1,886 ft (575 m)

Population (2020)
  - Total: 57
  - Density: 1.6/sq mi (0.60/km^{2})
- GNIS feature ID: 0475446

Palacky Township is a township in Ellsworth County, Kansas, United States. As of the 2020 census, its population was 57.

== Geography ==
Palacky Township covers an area of 36.43 square miles (94.4 km^{2}) and contains no incorporated settlements. According to the USGS, it contains one cemetery, Palacky.
