= Claflin, Kansas =

City in Barton County, Kansas

- City
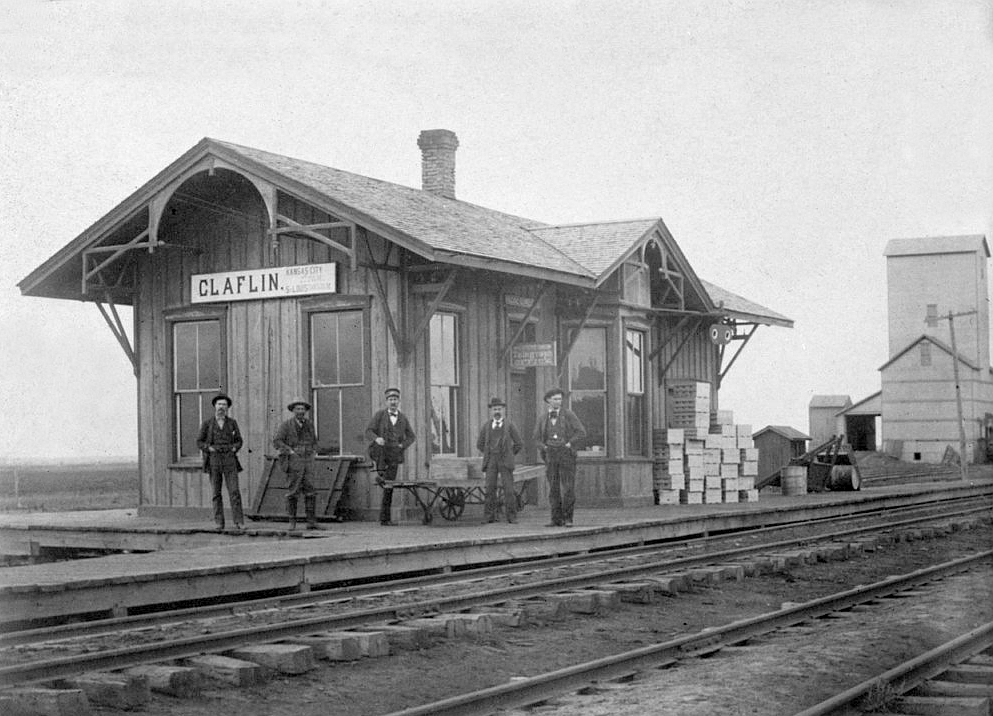
- Former Missouri Pacific Railroad depot in Claflin (1900)

- Location within Barton County and Kansas

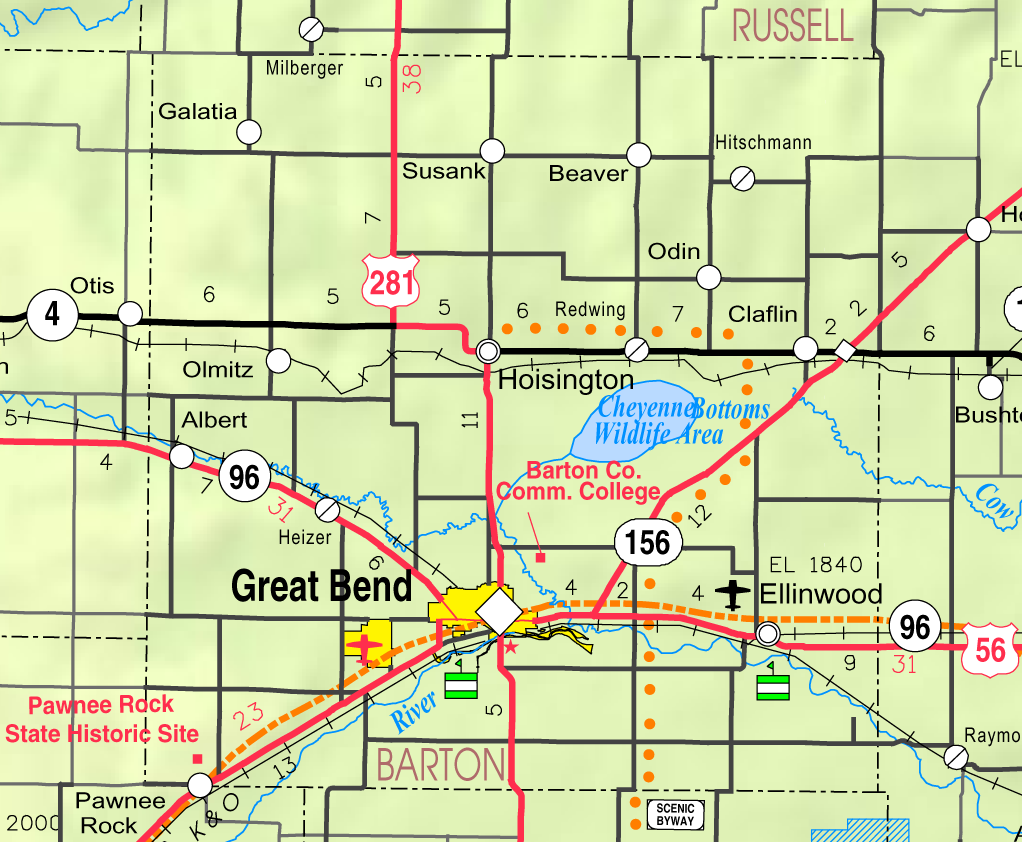
- KDOT map of Barton County (legend)
- Coordinates: 38°31′30″N 98°32′01″W
- Country: United States
- State: Kansas
- County: Barton
- Founded: 1887
- Incorporated: 1901

Area
  - Total: 0.32 sq mi (0.84 km^{2})
  - Land: 0.32 sq mi (0.84 km^{2})
  - Water: 0 sq mi (0.00 km^{2})
- Elevation: 1,811 ft (552 m)

Population (2020)
  - Total: 562
  - Density: 1,700/sq mi (670/km^{2})
- Time zone: UTC-6 (CST)
  - Summer (DST): UTC-5 (CDT)
- ZIP Code: 67525
- Area code: 620
- FIPS code: 20-13425
- GNIS ID: 475531
- Website: www.cityofclaflin.com

Claflin is a city in Barton County, Kansas, United States. As of the 2020 census, the population of the city was 562.

== History ==
Prior to American expansion and occupation, the region was controlled by Cheyenne, Pawnee, and Kiowa tribes. The Santa Fe Trail contributed to American settlement in Barton County, as it did throughout Kansas and much of the southern Great Plains.

The first settlement claim recorded in the area of Claflin was made by George Platt in 1870. This claim was divided and re-entered, eventually being sold to J. H. Williamson in 1875, and becoming the town of Claflin.

The community was officially organized in response to Missouri Pacific Railroad plans for a branch line to come through the area. Tracks were laid by 1887.

The station, on the south side of the tracks, was originally named Giles City after landowner Stelle Giles. Farmer and landowner William Albro Giles, son of Stella Giles, did not sell the 40 acres desired by the town company for building a town on the south side of the tracks. The land for the town was purchased on the north side of the tracks from J. H. Williamson. Judge Oliver Perry Hamilton surveyed the land and named the town Claflin, after his wife, Adelia Maria Claflin. The Claflin Town Company, with Stelle Giles as president, filed the townsite with the Barton County Register of Deeds on March 31, 1887.

The first official resident of Claflin was Robert Leslie Hamilton, who built and operated the S. S. Chatten Lumber Company. Other early residents include: Mel Cummings, railroad agent; George Norris; J. H. Cannon, store owner, banker, undertaker; M. C. Elmore, hardware store owner; Cas Dermitt, cafe owner; A. A. German, elevator operator; Charles Bucker, blacksmith; Charles Vert, publisher of the Claflin Clarion.

The city was incorporated by order of the Barton County Commissioners on July 18, 1901, and the first election was held on August 2, 1901.

== Geography ==
According to the United States Census Bureau, the city has a total area of 0.33 square miles (0.85 km^{2}), all land.

== Demographics ==
Historical population
| Census | Pop. | Note | %± |
|---|---|---|---|
| 1910 | 554 | | — |
| 1920 | 648 | | 17.0% |
| 1930 | 607 | | −6.3% |
| 1940 | 747 | | 23.1% |
| 1950 | 921 | | 23.3% |
| 1960 | 891 | | −3.3% |
| 1970 | 887 | | −0.4% |
| 1980 | 764 | | −13.9% |
| 1990 | 678 | | −11.3% |
| 2000 | 705 | | 4.0% |
| 2010 | 645 | | −8.5% |
| 2020 | 562 | | −12.9% |
U.S. Decennial Census

=== 2020 census ===
The 2020 United States census counted 562 people, 240 households, and 152 families in Claflin. The population density was 1,667.7 per square mile (643.9/km^{2}). There were 280 housing units at an average density of 830.9 per square mile (320.8/km^{2}). The racial makeup was 95.2% (535) white or European American (93.59% non-Hispanic white), 0.18% (1) black or African-American, 0.0% (0) Native American or Alaska Native, 0.18% (1) Asian, 0.0% (0) Pacific Islander or Native Hawaiian, 0.71% (4) from other races, and 3.74% (21) from two or more races. Hispanic or Latino of any race was 2.14% (12) of the population.

Of the 240 households, 27.9% had children under the age of 18; 52.9% were married couples living together; 20.0% had a female householder with no spouse or partner present. 32.5% of households consisted of individuals and 15.8% had someone living alone who was 65 years of age or older. The average household size was 2.2 and the average family size was 3.1. The percent of those with a bachelor's degree or higher was estimated to be 11.0% of the population.

24.0% of the population was under the age of 18, 7.8% from 18 to 24, 24.0% from 25 to 44, 25.4% from 45 to 64, and 18.7% who were 65 years of age or older. The median age was 38.8 years. For every 100 females, there were 97.2 males. For every 100 females ages 18 and older, there were 100.5 males.

The 2016–2020 5-year American Community Survey estimates show that the median household income was $43,516 (with a margin of error of +/- $7,215) and the median family income was $57,813 (+/- $28,752). Males had a median income of $37,813 (+/- $12,297) versus $26,111 (+/- $9,140) for females. The median income for those above 16 years old was $31,932 (+/- $11,060). Approximately, 15.2% of families and 21.6% of the population were below the poverty line, including 31.9% of those under the age of 18 and 11.9% of those ages 65 or over.

=== 2010 census ===
As of the census of 2010, there were 645 people, 267 households, and 175 families living in the city. The population density was 1,954.5 inhabitants per square mile (754.6/km^{2}). There were 299 housing units at an average density of 906.1 per square mile (349.8/km^{2}). The racial makeup of the city was 96.9% White, 0.2% African American, 0.3% Native American, 1.2% from other races, and 1.4% from two or more races. Hispanic or Latino of any race were 3.6% of the population.

There were 267 households, of which 27.3% had children under the age of 18 living with them, 54.7% were married couples living together, 7.9% had a female householder with no husband present, 3.0% had a male householder with no wife present, and 34.5% were non-families. 30.7% of all households were made up of individuals, and 17.3% had someone living alone who was 65 years of age or older. The average household size was 2.42 and the average family size was 3.04.

The median age in the city was 42.6 years. 23.6% of residents were under the age of 18; 8.5% were between the ages of 18 and 24; 21.1% were from 25 to 44; 28.4% were from 45 to 64; and 18.4% were 65 years of age or older. The gender makeup of the city was 48.5% male and 51.5% female.

== Education ==
The community is served by Central Plains USD 112 public school district. The Central Plains High School mascot is the "Oilers" and current principal is Toby Holmes.

Prior to a consolidation, the school and mascot were known as the Claflin High School "Wildcats".

As the Claflin Wildcats, they won the Kansas State High School 8-Man DII football championship in 1991 and 1992 as well as the 2-1A football championship in 1997, 1998 and 1999. The Central Plains Oilers won the Kansas State High School 8-Man DI football championship in 2014, and again in 2018 after an undefeated season, finishing 13–0 with the Kansas State Ranking of #1 for their classification, and a National ranking of #8 in the country.

== Notable people ==
- Walter Hickel (1919–2010) - Twice governor of Alaska. United States Secretary of the Interior under President Richard Nixon.
- Jackie Stiles - college basketball player.
