= Green Garden Township, Kansas =

Green Garden Township
- Township
- Location in Ellsworth County
- Coordinates: 38°33′56″N 098°18′46″W
- Country: United States
- State: Kansas
- County: Ellsworth

Area
  - Total: 36.48 sq mi (94.49 km^{2})
  - Land: 36.40 sq mi (94.28 km^{2})
  - Water: 0.081 sq mi (0.21 km^{2}) 0.22%
- Elevation: 1,781 ft (543 m)

Population (2020)
  - Total: 205
  - Density: 5.63/sq mi (2.17/km^{2})
- GNIS feature ID: 0475547

Green Garden Township is a township in Ellsworth County, Kansas, United States. As of the 2020 census, its population was 205.

== Geography ==
Green Garden Township covers an area of 36.48 square miles (94.5 km^{2}) and contains one incorporated settlement, Lorraine. According to the USGS, it contains two cemeteries: Baptist and Lorraine.
