= Fort Harker (Kansas) =

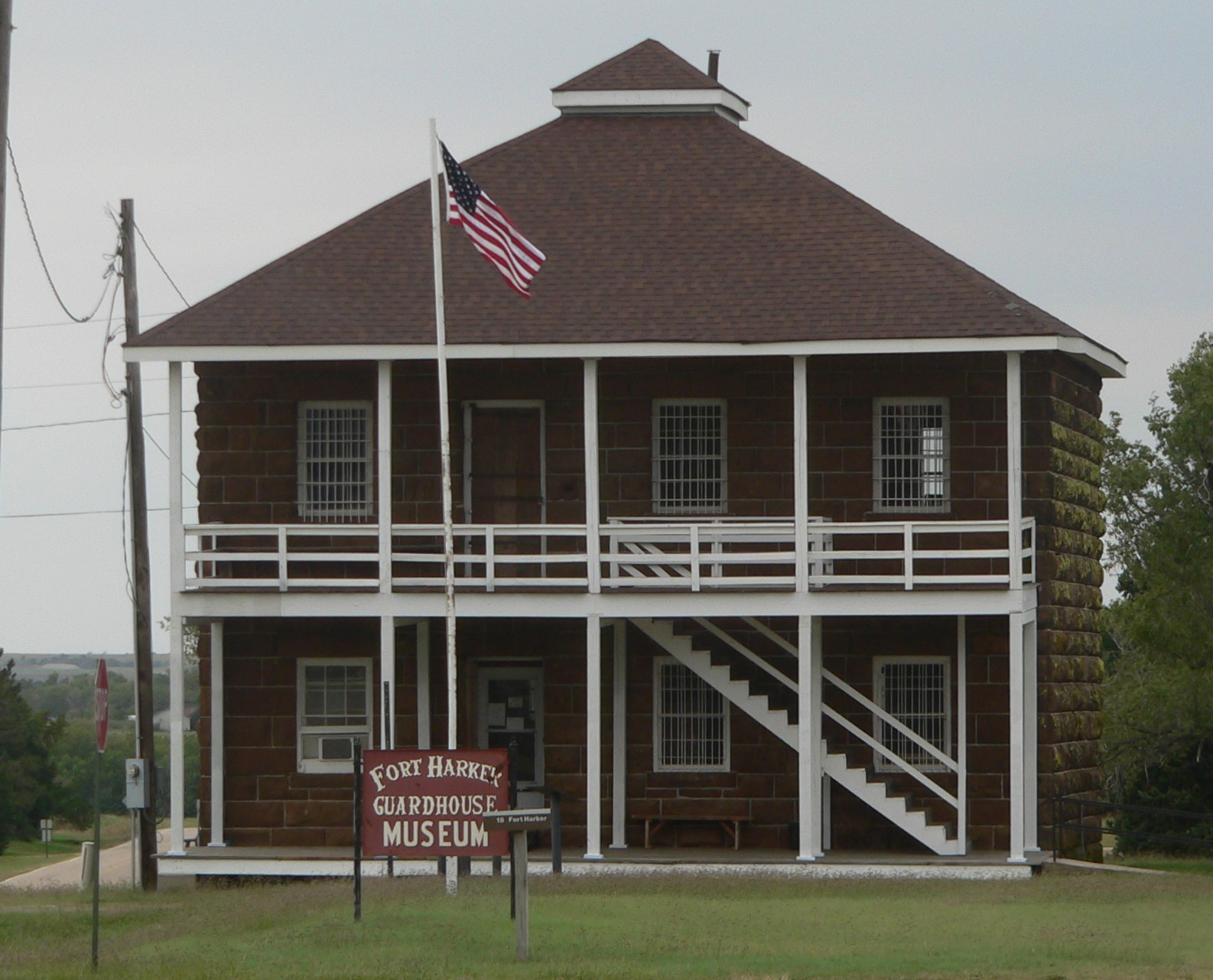
- Fort Harker guardhouse (2014)

- Location of Fort Harker in Ellsworth County, Kansas
- 38°42′35″N 98°9′25″W
- Location: Kanopolis, Kansas, USA

History
- Built: 1866-1867

Fort Harker, located in Kanopolis, Kansas, was an active military installation of the United States Army from November 17, 1866, to October 5, 1872. The fortification was named after General Charles Garrison Harker, who was killed in action at the Battle of Kennesaw Mountain in the American Civil War. Fort Harker replaced Fort Ellsworth, which had been located 1.6 km (0.99 mi) from the location of Fort Harker and was abandoned after the new fortifications at Fort Harker were constructed. Fort Harker was a major distribution point for all military points farther west and was one of the most important military stations west of the Missouri River.

== History ==
Fort Ellsworth was established in August, 1864 at the junction of the Fort Riley-Fort Larned Road and the Smoky Hill Trail, near the Smoky Hill River. Fort Ellsworth was established as the command headquarters for the District of the Upper Arkansas. Soldiers at the fort patrolled the overland trails to protect wagon trains from any resistance from the Native American tribes in the area. The fort also served an important role in distributing supplies to other United States Army outposts further west. Fort Ellsworth connected supply lines from Fort Leavenworth and Fort Riley to the east with Fort Zarah, Fort Larned, Fort Dodge, Fort Hays, and Fort Wallace to the west. After two years of rapid growth, the fort was badly in need of better facilities and more space.

=== Construction ===
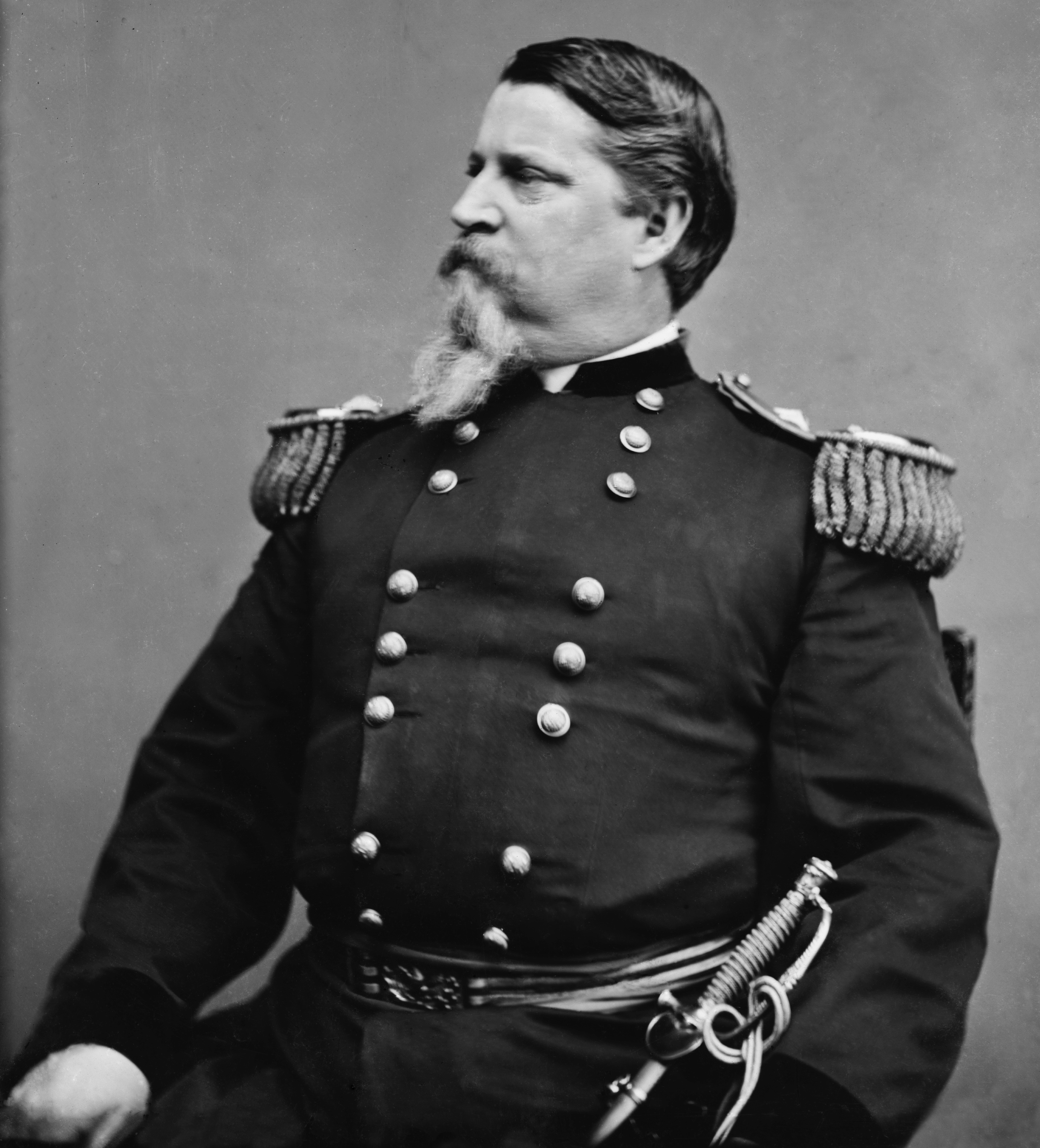
General Winfield S. Hancock

Military orders for the construction of a new fort to replace Fort Ellsworth were issued by General Winfield S. Hancock, commander of the Division of the Missouri, on November 17, 1866. The new fort would be located approximately 1.6 km (0.99 mi) northeast of Fort Ellsworth. Construction may have begun before the official order, as Fort Ellsworth had a master carpenter, a master mason, five carpenters, and fourteen masons on staff as early as September, 1866. Based on the number of civilian contractors on the fort's payroll, major construction of the facility was likely completed by the summer of 1867. In June 1867, the remainder of the buildings at old Fort Ellsworth were ordered torn down. Fort Ellsworth was sold to land developers and became the town of Ellsworth, Kansas.

Soon after the completion of major construction, the railroad arrived at Fort Harker. The Union Pacific Eastern Division completed a line to Fort Harker in July 1867. The rail line ran through the fort, and a depot was established just outside the fort. Two large warehouses were built next to the line, which became the principal resupply route for the fort. By the end of 1867, the fort supported a four-company garrison, the supply depot and over 75 buildings.

=== Cholera epidemic of 1867 ===
In the summer of 1867, an Asiatic cholera outbreak began amongst the soldiers of the four companies of the 38th Infantry stationed at the fort. The disease may have arrived with the 38th, who traveled to the fort from St. Louis, Missouri, where a cholera outbreak was also occurring. The first case of cholera at the fort was diagnosed on June 28. Within days, one civilian and one soldier had died from the disease, and the epidemic had spread to other soldiers and civilians at the fort, as well as settlers in the surrounding area. The Post Quarter Master reported that 58 citizens were buried during the month of June. The epidemic continued through the remainder of 1867, and by the end of the year the official report tabulated 392 cases with 24 deaths among the white troops and 500 cases with 22 deaths among the black troops stationed at or near the fort.

=== Indian War campaigns ===
Although no battles were ever fought at the fort itself, troops stationed at Fort Harker were involved in the ongoing Indian Wars between the United States Army and the natives of the Great Plains. The troops stationed at Fort Harker in 1867 performed more escorts of wagon trains in one year than troops stationed at any other frontier fort in the post-Civil War era. Once the railroad arrived at the fort in 1867, the need for escort patrols began to shift to the west, and by 1868 the primary role of Fort Harker was changing to that of a supply depot and troop staging site.

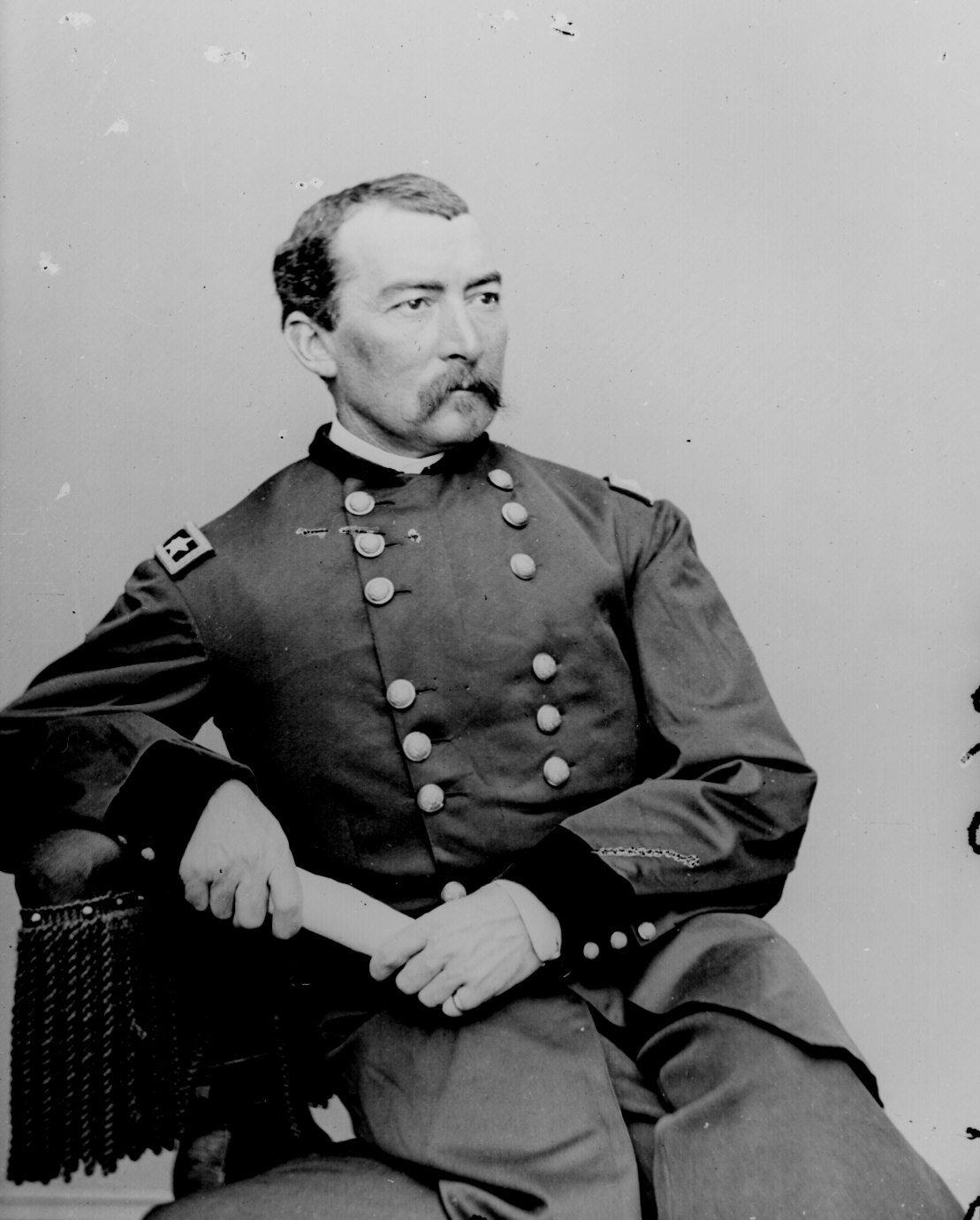
General Philip Henry Sheridan

In the fall of 1868, General Philip Henry Sheridan moved his command headquarters from Fort Leavenworth to Fort Harker, from where he commanded the campaigns against the Native Americans in the winter of 1868/1869. On August 25, 1869, Brevet Colonel Joseph G. Tilford was sent to Fort Harker, where he commanded two troops of General George Armstrong Custer's 7th Cavalry. After wintering at the fort, Tilford and the cavalry set out on a campaign in February 1870. In May 1870, General Custer and the remaining troops of the 7th Cavalry passed through Fort Harker on their way from Fort Leavenworth to Fort Hays to engage the Native Americans further west.

=== Closing ===
By 1871, Fort Harker had declined in importance in the Indian Wars. Native Americans living in the area of the fort had been displaced by white settlers, and the scene of conflicts had shifted to the west. An expanding railroad network diminished the importance of the fort as a distribution point for supplies. In March 1872, the 15th Infantry stationed at Fort Harker redeployed to Fort Union. On April 5, the remaining companies of the 5th Infantry departed from the fort as well. Official orders to abandon Fort Harker were received on April 8, 1872. Soldiers of the 5th Cavalry left Fort Harker on May 7, leaving behind a small garrison of two officers and five enlisted men from the 5th Infantry. The base was completely abandoned by October 5, 1872.

== Geography ==
Fort Harker was located at the site of the present-day community of Kanopolis, Kansas.

== Fort Harker Museum ==
- Fort Harker Guardhouse; Fort Harker Officers' Quarters
- U.S. National Register of Historic Places
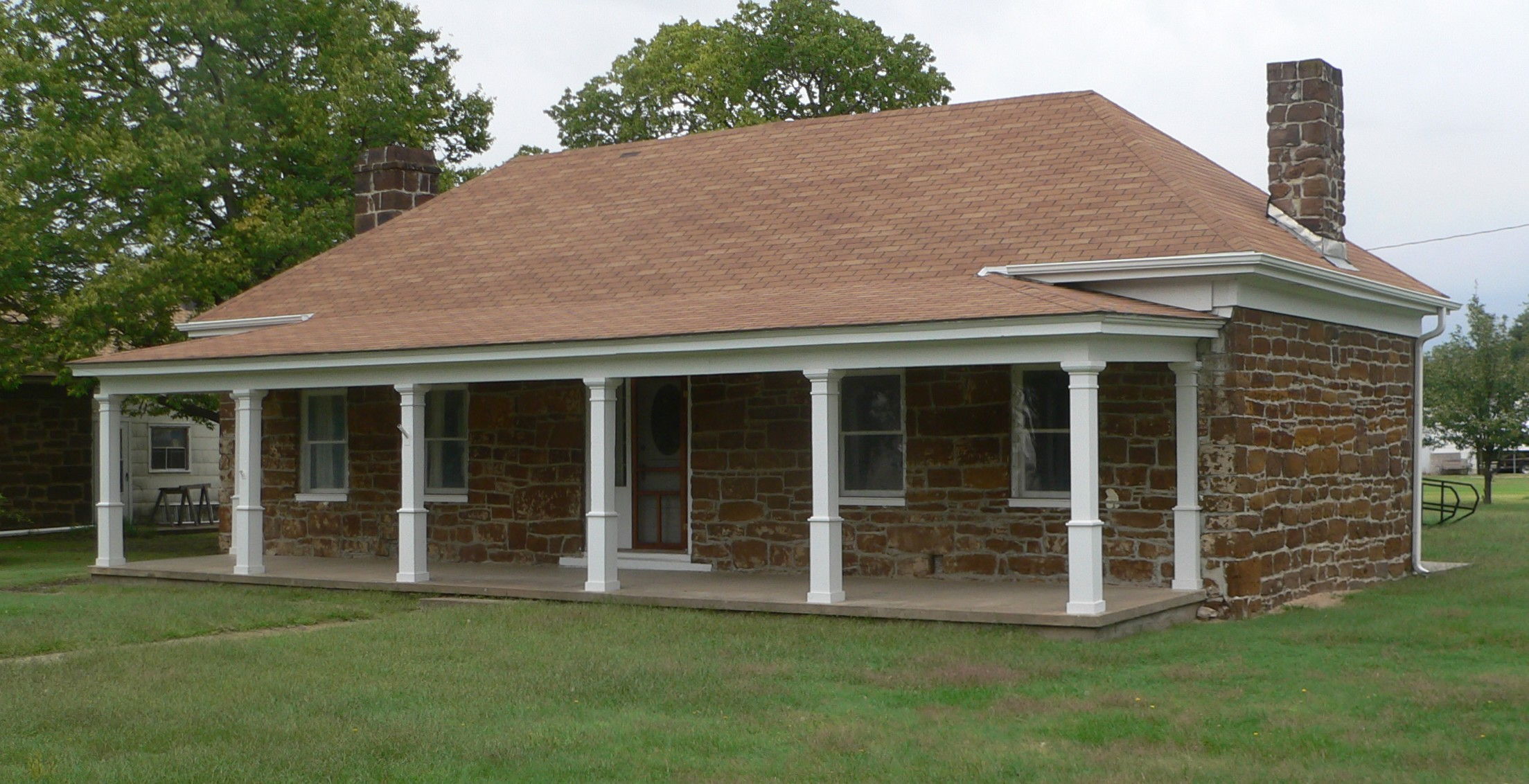
- Fort Harker officers' quarters (2014)
- Location: East side of Colorado St along Ohio Ave, Kanopolis, Kansas, USA
- Coordinates: 38.71035°N 98.16141°W 38.71054°N 98.15894°W
- Built: 1866-1867
- NRHP reference No.: 72000497; 74000834
- Added to NRHP: February 23, 1972; November 20, 1974

The Ellsworth County Historical Society maintains three of the original buildings of Fort Harker as a museum commemorating both Fort Ellsworth and Harker. These include the Fort Harker Guardhouse and the Fort Harker Commanding Officers' Quarters, which are each separately listed on the National Register of Historic Places, and also the Junior Officer's Quarters. The museum also features a train depot with salt mine and later 19th/early 20th Century exhibits.

A second Junior Officer's Quarters is owned as a private residence.

== See also ==
- Hodgden House Museum Complex, in Ellsworth, also operated as a museum by the Ellsworth County Historical Society
