= Holyrood station (Kansas) =

Holyrood
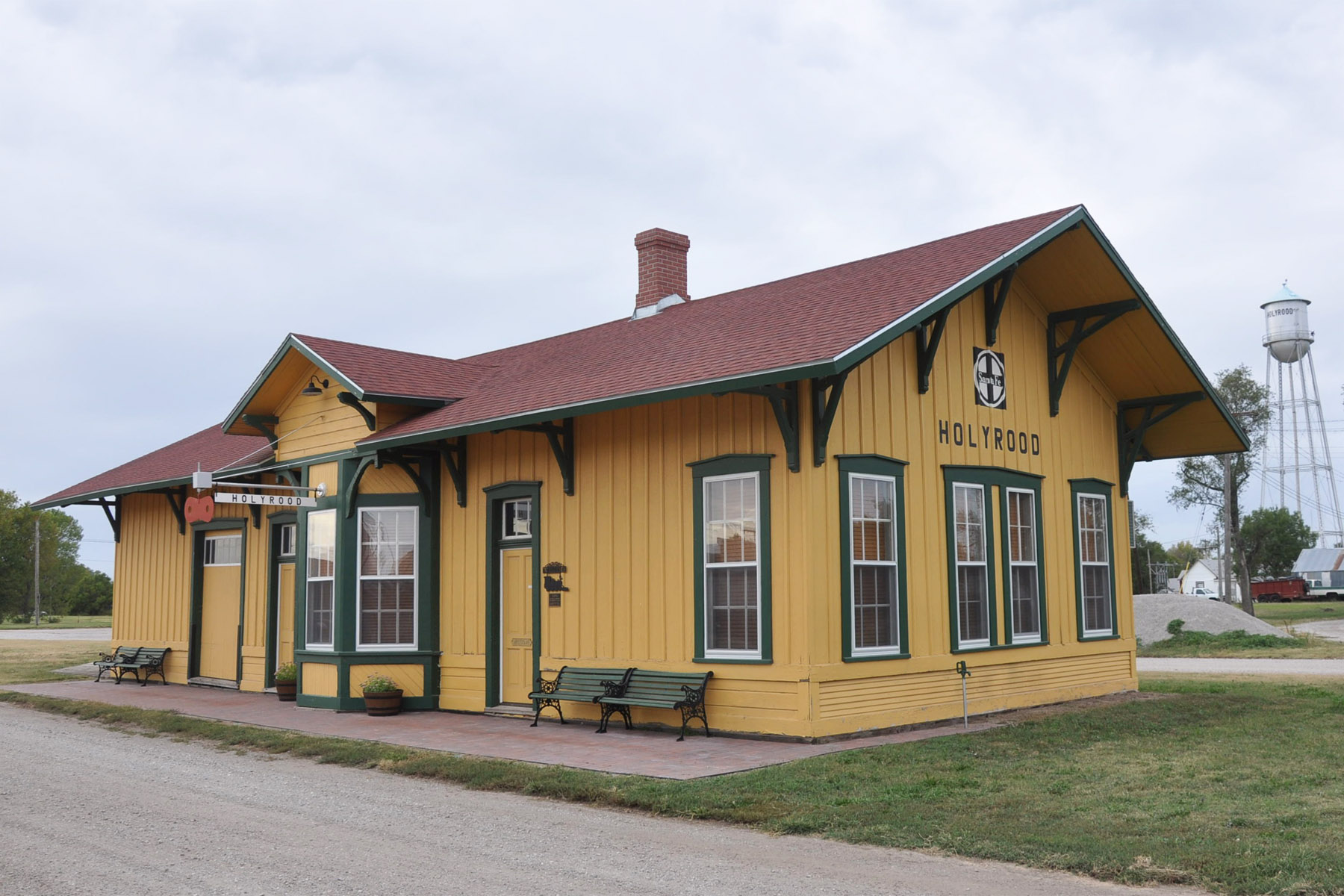

General information
- Location: North Main Street, Holyrood, Kansas
- System: Former AT&SF passenger rail station
- Platforms: 1 side platform
- Tracks: 2

Construction
- Structure type: at-grade

History
- Opened: 1887
- Closed: unknown

Former services
Preceding station	Atchison, Topeka and Santa Fe Railway	Following station
Lorraine toward Little River	Little River – Galatia	Farhman toward Galatia
- Holyrood Santa Fe Depot
- U.S. National Register of Historic Places
- Location within Kansas Location within the United States
- Location: Between Main St and Smith St, Holyrood, Kansas
- Coordinates: 38°35′16″N 98°24′39″W
- Area: less than one acre
- Built: 1887
- Built by: AT & SF Railway
- Architectural style: Late Victorian
- MPS: Railroad Resources of Kansas MPS
- NRHP reference No.: 10000262
- Added to NRHP: May 17, 2010
Location

The Holyrood Santa Fe Depot, located between Main Street and Smith Street in Holyrood, Kansas, United States.

== History ==
It was built in 1887, then listed on the National Register of Historic Places in 2010.

A restoration project was ongoing in December 2016.
