= Clear Creek Township =

Clear Creek Township or Clearcreek Township may refer to:

== Arkansas ==
- Clear Creek Township, Drew County, Arkansas, in Drew County, Arkansas
- Clear Creek Township, Hot Spring County, Arkansas, in Hot Spring County, Arkansas
- Clear Creek Township, Sevier County, Arkansas, in Sevier County, Arkansas

== Indiana ==
- Clear Creek Township, Huntington County, Indiana
- Clear Creek Township, Monroe County, Indiana

== Iowa ==
- Clear Creek Township, Jasper County, Iowa
- Clear Creek Township, Johnson County, Iowa
- Clear Creek Township, Keokuk County, Iowa

== Kansas ==
- Clear Creek Township, Ellsworth County, Kansas
- Clear Creek Township, Marion County, Kansas
- Clear Creek Township, Nemaha County, Kansas, in Nemaha County, Kansas
- Clear Creek Township, Pottawatomie County, Kansas, in Pottawatomie County, Kansas
- Clear Creek Township, Stafford County, Kansas, in Stafford County, Kansas

== Missouri ==
- Clear Creek Township, Cooper County, Missouri
- Clear Creek Township, Vernon County, Missouri

== Nebraska ==
- Clear Creek Township, Saunders County, Nebraska

== North Carolina ==
- Clear Creek Township, Henderson County, North Carolina, in Henderson County, North Carolina

== Ohio ==
- Clear Creek Township, Ashland County, Ohio
- Clearcreek Township, Warren County, Ohio
- Clearcreek Township, Fairfield County, Ohio
