= Holyrood, Kansas =

City in Ellsworth County, Kansas

- City
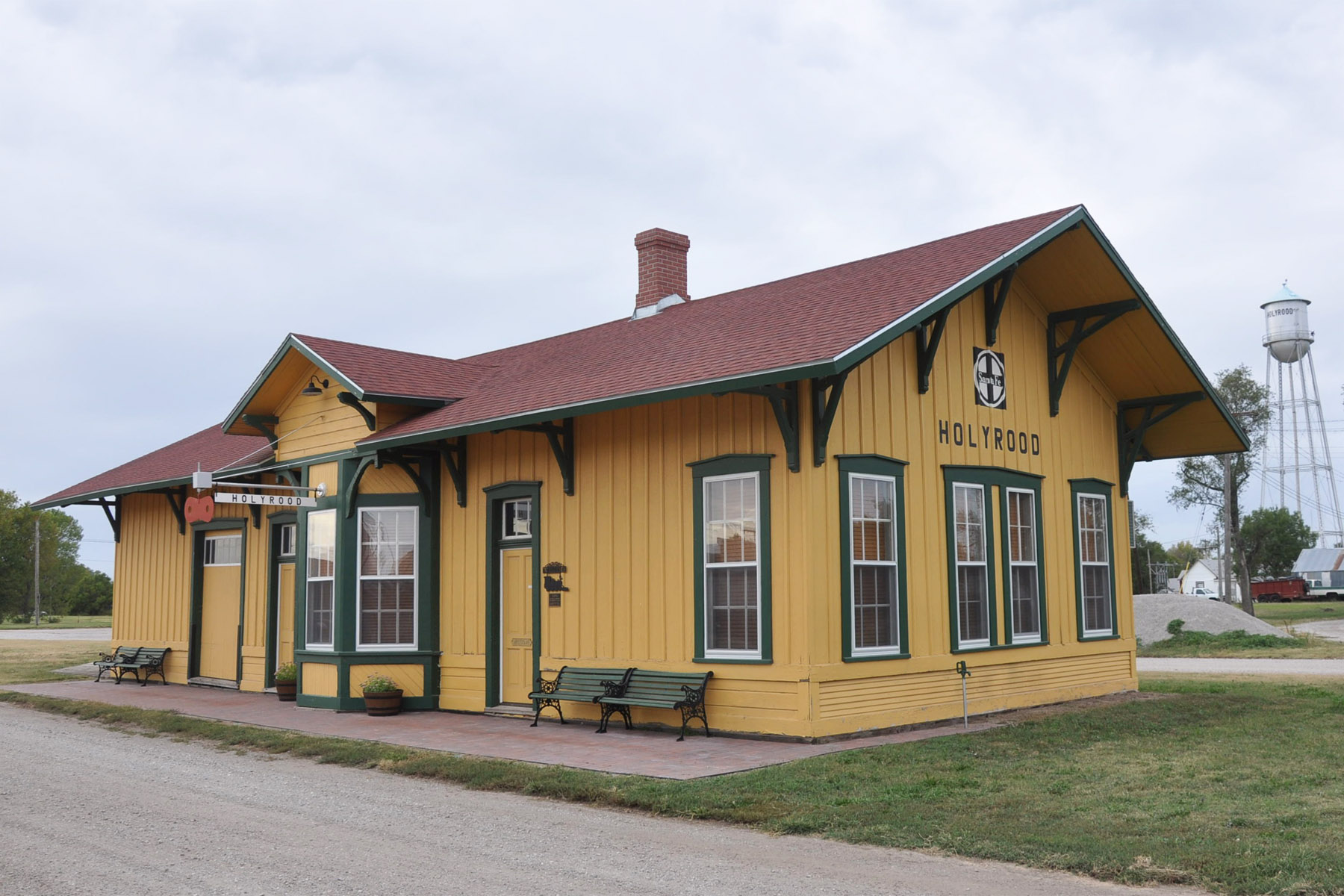
- Holyrood Santa Fe Depot (2021)

- Location within County and Kansas

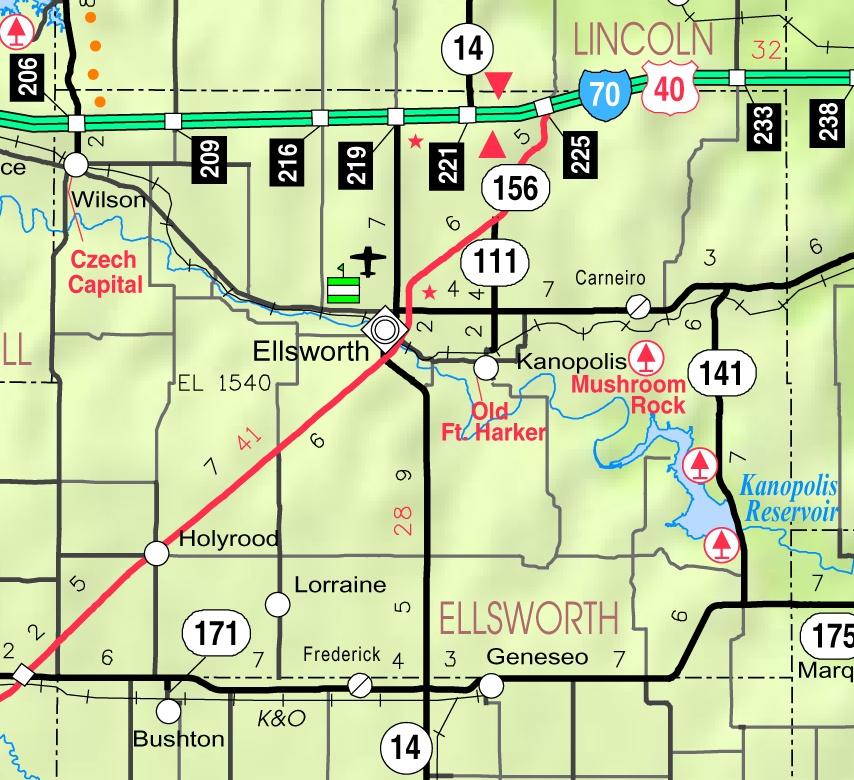
- KDOT map of Ellsworth County (legend)
- Coordinates: 38°35′15″N 98°24′43″W
- Country: United States
- State: Kansas
- County: Ellsworth
- Founded: 1874
- Incorporated: 1901
- Named for: Holyrood Abbey

Government
  - Type: Mayor–Council
  - Mayor: Kenny Scheppman

Area
  - Total: 0.44 sq mi (1.13 km^{2})
  - Land: 0.43 sq mi (1.11 km^{2})
  - Water: 0.0077 sq mi (0.02 km^{2})
- Elevation: 1,808 ft (551 m)

Population (2020)
  - Total: 403
  - Density: 940/sq mi (363/km^{2})
- Time zone: UTC-6 (CST)
  - Summer (DST): [[UTC-5 postal_code_type = ZIP Code]] (CDT)
- Postal code: 67450
- Area code: 785
- FIPS code: 20-32850
- GNIS ID: 2394411
- Website: holyroodkansas.com

Holyrood is a city in Ellsworth County, Kansas, United States. As of the 2020 census, the population of the city was 403.

== History ==
Holyrood was founded in 1874 and was established as a city in 1886. The original site of Holyrood was a half-mile south of Holyrood's present site. When settlers first moved into the area, dugout houses were the home of choice. The first settlers of Holyrood were Irish, but they were soon followed by people of German and Czech Origin. Some of the first names to appear in the area were Phelan, Corrigan, Schepmann, and Siemsen as noted in the St. Peter Lutheran Church's earliest records.

The first post office in Holyrood was established in June 1874, but the name of the post office was spelled Hollyrood. The name was changed on July 26, 1898. The first postmaster was John Corrigan who served for over four years. Corrigan hailed from Holyrood, Ontario, Canada. The name of Holyrood originally comes from Holyrood Abbey, today known as the Abbey and Palace of Holyroodhouse, in Edinburgh, Scotland. Through Corrigan, the town can directly trace its name to the town of Holyrood, Ontario, Canada, a town settled by Scottish people.

During the first several decades of Holyrood's existence, church worship was held in the homes of local farmers, funerals were at the home of the deceased, and marriages were performed in the home of the bride's parents. In 1883, the first church of Holyrood was organized: the St. Peter's Lutheran Church. The first building for the Lutheran congregation was built one mile southeast of Holyrood. In 1908, the parsonage was moved into town.

To meet the needs of the Catholic settlers, St. Mary's Catholic Church was constructed. Date of construction is given as both 1886 and 1889. The Church was originally called The Church of the Holy Rood (Cross), but the name was later changed.

Next came the St. Paul's Evangelical church. Land for this church was bought on March 27, 1892, and constructing of the church was finished in September 1892. The church served its purpose for 35 years until it was dismantled and a new brick church was constructed in its place. The church was later renamed the United Church of Christ.

The first official school of Holyrood opened its doors in 1895 and catered to first through ninth grade. Before then, school was held in the homes of settlers or at the Lutheran Church. In 1906, a new school was constructed followed by another new elementary school in 1930. Holyrood High School was established in 1920.

Holyrood has had two local newspapers: The Holyrood Banner and the Holyrood Gazette. One of the most well known columns in the Holyrood Gazette was written by Leonard Sekavec and was known as "Sek's Appeal." The columns written by Sekavec had not only been printed in the Gazette, but also had been quoted in other newspapers including ones from New York and Los Angeles. Sekavec wrote the column for forty years and was also the editor of the Holyrood Gazette.

The city's current slogan is "A Little City with Lots of Pride."

== Geography ==
According to the United States Census Bureau, the city has a total area of 0.43 square miles (1.11 km^{2}), of which 0.42 square miles (1.09 km^{2}) is land and 0.01 square miles (0.03 km^{2}) is water.

== Demographics ==
Historical population
Census	Pop.	Note	%±
1910	361		—
1920	421		16.6%
1930	432		2.6%
1940	559		29.4%
1950	748		33.8%
1960	737		−1.5%
1970	593		−19.5%
1980	567		−4.4%
1990	492		−13.2%
2000	464		−5.7%
2010	447		−3.7%
2020	403		−9.8%
U.S. Decennial Census

=== 2020 census ===
The 2020 United States census counted 403 people, 190 households, and 111 families in Holyrood. The population density was 937.2 per square mile (361.9/km^{2}). There were 236 housing units at an average density of 548.8 per square mile (211.9/km^{2}). The racial makeup was 90.57% (365) white or European American (89.83% non-Hispanic white), 0.5% (2) black or African-American, 0.25% (1) Native American or Alaska Native, 0.5% (2) Asian, 0.0% (0) Pacific Islander or Native Hawaiian, 0.99% (4) from other races, and 7.2% (29) from two or more races. Hispanic or Latino of any race was 2.73% (11) of the population.

Of the 190 households, 24.2% had children under the age of 18; 49.5% were married couples living together; 26.3% had a female householder with no spouse or partner present. 35.3% of households consisted of individuals and 15.8% had someone living alone who was 65 years of age or older. The average household size was 2.2 and the average family size was 2.7. The percent of those with a bachelor's degree or higher was estimated to be 25.3% of the population.

20.8% of the population was under the age of 18, 6.0% from 18 to 24, 25.3% from 25 to 44, 24.6% from 45 to 64, and 23.3% who were 65 years of age or older. The median age was 41.3 years. For every 100 females, there were 114.4 males. For every 100 females ages 18 and older, there were 107.1 males.

The 2016–2020 5-year American Community Survey estimates show that the median household income was $76,667 (with a margin of error of +/- $15,136) and the median family income was $79,861 (+/- $14,594). Males had a median income of $51,736 (+/- $6,280) versus $19,205 (+/- $10,633) for females. The median income for those above 16 years old was $28,500 (+/- $9,155). Approximately, 6.4% of families and 12.6% of the population were below the poverty line, including 21.0% of those under the age of 18 and 19.4% of those ages 65 or over.

=== 2010 census ===
As of the census of 2010, there were 447 people, 202 households, and 128 families residing in the city. The population density was 1,064.3 inhabitants per square mile (410.9/km^{2}). There were 259 housing units at an average density of 616.7 per square mile (238.1/km^{2}). The racial makeup of the city was 97.1% White, 0.4% Native American, 0.2% Asian, 0.2% from other races, and 2.0% from two or more races. Hispanic or Latino of any race were 0.7% of the population.

There were 202 households, of which 25.2% had children under the age of 18 living with them, 54.5% were married couples living together, 5.9% had a female householder with no husband present, 3.0% had a male householder with no wife present, and 36.6% were non-families. 34.2% of all households were made up of individuals, and 19.9% had someone living alone who was 65 years of age or older. The average household size was 2.21 and the average family size was 2.76.

The median age in the city was 49.4 years. 21.9% of residents were under the age of 18; 2.9% were between the ages of 18 and 24; 18.6% were from 25 to 44; 33.1% were from 45 to 64; and 23.5% were 65 years of age or older. The gender makeup of the city was 47.4% male and 52.6% female.

== Government ==
The Holyrood government consists of a mayor and five council members. The council meets the first and third Mondays of each month at 6:30 pm.

- City Hall, 110 S Main.

== Education ==
The community is served by Central Plains USD 112 public school district and home to Central Plains Elementary School. The Central Plains High School mascot is Central Plains Oilers. The Oilers won the Kansas State High School 8-Man DII football championship in 2014.

Holyrood schools were closed through school unification. The Holyrood High School mascot was Holyrood Cardinals.

== Transportation ==
The Atchison, Topeka and Santa Fe Railway formerly provided mixed train service to Holyrood on a line between Little River and Galatia until at least 1961. As of 2025, the nearest passenger rail station is located in Hutchinson, where Amtrak's Southwest Chief stops once daily on a route from Chicago to Los Angeles.

== Notable people ==
- James Fugaté, author (as James Barr) of gay themed novels, plays, and articles
- Fay Thomas, baseball player
