= Clear Creek Township, Ellsworth County, Kansas =

Clear Creek Township
- Township
- Location in Ellsworth County
- Coordinates: 38°44′23″N 098°05′42″W
- Country: United States
- State: Kansas
- County: Ellsworth

Area
  - Total: 36.4 sq mi (94.2 km^{2})
  - Land: 36.31 sq mi (94.03 km^{2})
  - Water: 0.062 sq mi (0.16 km^{2}) 0.17%
- Elevation: 1,552 ft (473 m)

Population (2020)
  - Total: 101
  - Density: 2.78/sq mi (1.07/km^{2})
- GNIS feature ID: 0475363

Clear Creek Township is a township in Ellsworth County, Kansas, United States. As of the 2020 census, its population was 101.

== Geography ==
Clear Creek Township covers an area of 36.37 square miles (94.2 km^{2}) and contains no incorporated settlements. According to the USGS, it contains two cemeteries: Clear Creek and Kanopolis.
