= Trivoli Township, Kansas =

Trivoli Township
- Township
- Location in Ellsworth County
- Coordinates: 38°33′57″N 098°05′28″W
- Country: United States
- State: Kansas
- County: Ellsworth

Area
  - Total: 36.10 sq mi (93.51 km^{2})
  - Land: 35.97 sq mi (93.16 km^{2})
  - Water: 0.14 sq mi (0.35 km^{2}) 0.37%
- Elevation: 1,680 ft (512 m)

Population (2020)
  - Total: 39
  - Density: 1.1/sq mi (0.42/km^{2})
- GNIS feature ID: 0475563

Trivoli Township is a township in Ellsworth County, Kansas, United States. As of the 2020 census, its population was 39.

== Geography ==
Trivoli Township covers an area of 36.11 square miles (93.5 km^{2}) and contains no incorporated settlements.

== Transportation ==
Trivoli Township contains one airport or landing strip, Rush Field.
