= Thomas Township, Kansas =

Thomas Township
- Township
- Location in Ellsworth County
- Coordinates: 38°33′56″N 098°12′07″W
- Country: United States
- State: Kansas
- County: Ellsworth

Area
  - Total: 36.16 sq mi (93.65 km^{2})
  - Land: 36.08 sq mi (93.45 km^{2})
  - Water: 0.073 sq mi (0.19 km^{2}) 0.2%
- Elevation: 1,785 ft (544 m)

Population (2020)
  - Total: 64
  - Density: 1.8/sq mi (0.68/km^{2})
- GNIS feature ID: 0475560

Thomas Township is a township in Ellsworth County, Kansas, United States.

== Geography ==
Thomas Township covers an area of 36.1 square miles (93 km^{2}) with an elevation of 1,787 feet (545 m) and contains no incorporated settlements.

== Demographics ==
In 1898, the population was 256, in 1900, the population dropped down to 215.
