= Langley Township, Kansas =

Langley Township
- Township
- Location in Ellsworth County
- Coordinates: 38°33′57″N 097°58′49″W
- Country: United States
- State: Kansas
- County: Ellsworth

Area
  - Total: 36.17 sq mi (93.67 km^{2})
  - Land: 35.49 sq mi (91.93 km^{2})
  - Water: 0.68 sq mi (1.75 km^{2}) 1.87%
- Elevation: 1,610 ft (490 m)

Population (2020)
  - Total: 60
  - Density: 1.7/sq mi (0.65/km^{2})
- GNIS feature ID: 0475571

Langley Township is a township in Ellsworth County, Kansas, United States. At the 2020 census, its population was 60.

== Geography ==
Langley Township covers an area of 36.17 square miles (93.7 km^{2}) and contains no incorporated settlements. According to the USGS, it contains one cemetery, Langley.

The stream of Wiley Creek runs through this township.
