= Thunder Ridge (disambiguation) =

The Thunder Ridge Ski Area is a ski area in Patterson, New York.

Thunder Ridge may also refer to:

- ThunderRidge High School, a high school in Highlands Ranch, Colorado
- Thunder Ridge High School, a high school in Idaho Falls, Idaho
- Thunder Ridge USD 110, a school district headquartered in Kensington, Kansas, including:
  - Thunder Ridge High School, a high school in Kensington
  - Thunder Ridge Middle School, a middle school in Agra
  - Thunder Ridge Elementary School, an elementary school in Kensigton
- Thunder Ridge Wilderness, a wilderness area in Rockbridge County, Virginia
