= Joy, Kansas =

Unincorporated community in Kiowa County, Kansas

- Unincorporated community
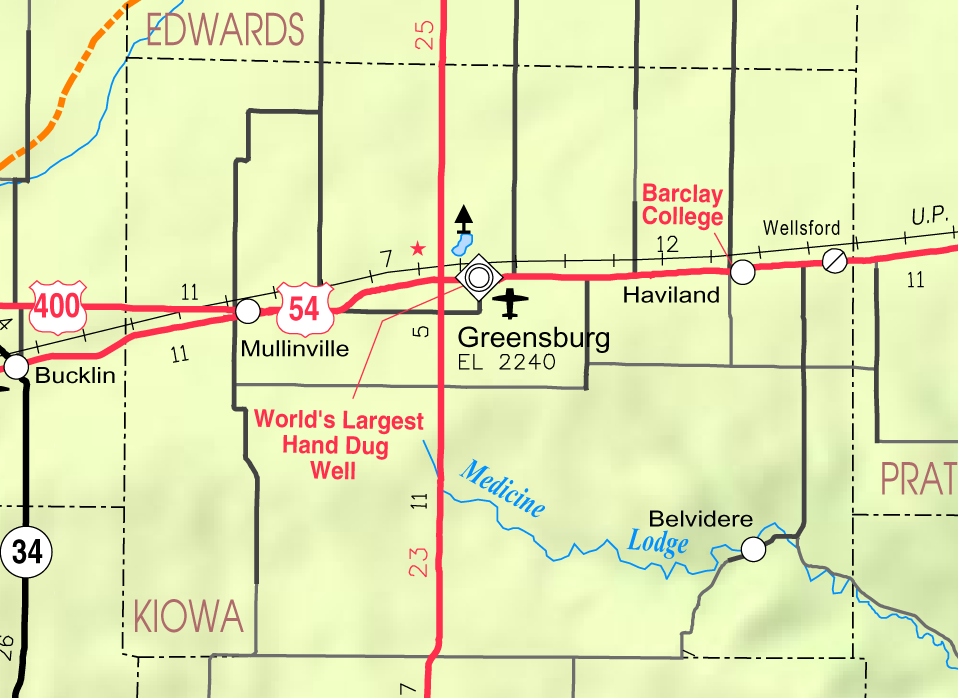
- KDOT map of Kiowa County (legend)

- Location within Kansas Location within the United States
- Coordinates: 37°35′43″N 99°23′41″W
- Country: United States
- State: Kansas
- County: Kiowa
- Elevation: 2,284 ft (696 m)
- Time zone: UTC-6 (CST)
  - Summer (DST): UTC-5 (CDT)
- Area code: 620
- FIPS code: 20-35675
- GNIS ID: 484672

Joy is an unincorporated community in Kiowa County, Kansas, United States.

== Geography ==
Joy is located on 19th Avenue next to the railroad between Greensburg and Mullinville.

== Economy ==
Joy has one business, a tall concrete grain elevator, otherwise the former community doesn't currently have any other buildings.

== Education ==
The community is served by Kiowa County USD 422 public school district.
