= Kiowa County, Kansas =

County in Kansas, United States

- County
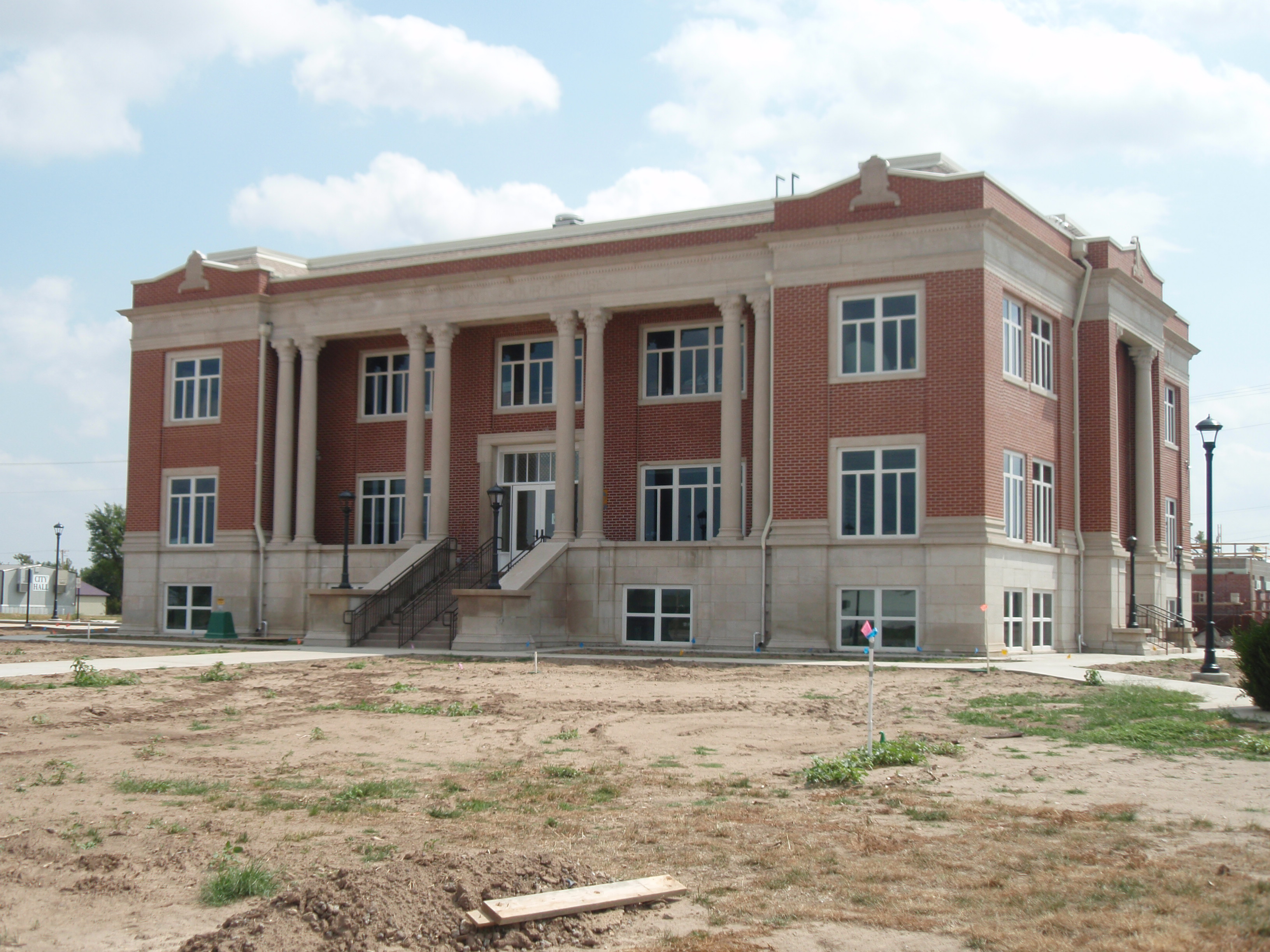
- Renovated County Courthouse in Greensburg (2009) after a tornado damaged it in 2007. Construction of the building started in 1920.

- Location within the U.S. state of Kansas
- Coordinates: 37°34′N 99°17′W
- Country: United States
- State: Kansas
- Founded: February 26, 1867
- Named for: Kiowa tribe
- Seat: Greensburg
- Largest city: Greensburg

Area
  - Total: 723 sq mi (1,870 km^{2})
  - Land: 723 sq mi (1,870 km^{2})
  - Water: 0.2 sq mi (0.52 km^{2}) 0.03%

Population (2020)
  - Total: 2,460
  - Estimate (2025): 2,432 ▼
  - Density: 3.4/sq mi (1.3/km^{2})
- Time zone: UTC−6 (Central)
  - Summer (DST): UTC−5 (CDT)
- Congressional district: 4th
- Website: kiowacountyks.gov

Kiowa County is a county located in the U.S. state of Kansas. Its county seat and largest city is Greensburg. As of the 2020 census, the county population was 2,460. The county is named after the Kiowa tribe.

== History ==
=== 19th century ===
In 1854, the Kansas Territory was organized, then in 1861 Kansas became the 34th U.S. state. In 1867, Kiowa County was established and named after the Kiowa tribe. In 1875, the county's land was given to a nearby county, but in 1886, Kiowa County was reestablished and organized.

The Santa Fe Railroad was built into the county around the time it was organized. The Greensburg Well, one of the largest hand-dug wells in the world, was built in 1887-1888. It has been a popular tourist attraction since 1939. The well is listed in the National Register of Historic Places.

The first oil well in Kiowa County was drilled in 1917.

Mabel Chase ran for county sheriff after her husband's time in the office was term-limited and became the state's first female elected sheriff. Her husband provided her the family's armored 1926 Hudson Super Six, and she was the first sheriff in Kansas to be supplied with a Thompson submachine gun. Chase conducted raids on local stills.

=== 21st century ===
On the evening of May 4, 2007, Greensburg was devastated by a massive EF5 tornado. It killed 11 people, injured 63 others, and destroyed 95% of the community.

The Kiowa County Courthouse was renovated with new windows and roof after the 2007 tornado damaged it. Originally, construction of the building started in 1920.

Throughout the night of May 18, 2025, Kiowa County was once hit again by storms. A family of large tornadoes, five of them rated EF3 on the Enhanced Fujita scale, struck rural homes and farmsteads across the county. A tornado emergency was prompted for the second time in Greensburg's history from one of the tornadoes.

== Geography ==
According to the U.S. Census Bureau, the county has a total area of 723 square miles (1,870 km^{2}), of which 723 square miles (1,870 km^{2}) is land and 0.2 square miles (0.52 km^{2}) (0.03%) is water.

Kiowa County has a large number of iron-rich meteorites in its soil due to the Brenham meteor fall over 10 thousand years ago.

=== Adjacent counties ===
- Edwards County (north)
- Pratt County (east)
- Barber County (southeast)
- Comanche County (south)
- Clark County (southwest)
- Ford County (west)

=== Major highways ===
- US-54 / US-400
- US-183

Kiowa County has only U.S. highways, no state highways.

== Demographics ==
Historical population
Census	Pop.	Note	%±
1890	2,873		—
1900	2,365		−17.7%
1910	6,174		161.1%
1920	6,164		−0.2%
1930	6,035		−2.1%
1940	5,112		−15.3%
1950	4,743		−7.2%
1960	4,626		−2.5%
1970	4,088		−11.6%
1980	4,046		−1.0%
1990	3,660		−9.5%
2000	3,278		−10.4%
2010	2,553		−22.1%
2020	2,460		−3.6%
2025 (est.)	2,432	▼	−1.1%
U.S. Decennial Census; 1790-1960 1900-1990; 1990-2000 2010-2020

=== Racial and ethnic composition ===
Kiowa County, Kansas – Racial and ethnic composition Note: the US Census treats Hispanic/Latino as an ethnic category. This table excludes Latinos from the racial categories and assigns them to a separate category. Hispanics/Latinos may be of any race.
Race / Ethnicity (NH = Non-Hispanic)	Pop 1980	Pop 1990	Pop 2000	Pop 2010	Pop 2020	% 1980	% 1990	% 2000	% 2010	% 2020
White alone (NH)	4,009	3,584	3,155	2,378	2,158	99.09%	97.92%	96.25%	93.15%	87.72%
Black or African American alone (NH)	3	7	7	12	43	0.07%	0.19%	0.21%	0.47%	1.75%
Native American or Alaska Native alone (NH)	6	16	18	22	10	0.15%	0.44%	0.55%	0.86%	0.41%
Asian alone (NH)	6	11	9	16	16	0.15%	0.30%	0.27%	0.63%	0.65%
Native Hawaiian or Pacific Islander alone (NH)	x	x	0	1	4	x	x	0.00%	0.04%	0.16%
Other race alone (NH)	7	3	3	0	6	0.17%	0.08%	0.09%	0.00%	0.24%
Mixed race or Multiracial (NH)	x	x	19	25	136	x	x	0.58%	0.98%	5.53%
Hispanic or Latino (any race)	15	39	67	99	87	0.37%	1.07%	2.04%	3.88%	3.54%
Total	4,046	3,660	3,278	2,553	2,460	100.00%	100.00%	100.00%	100.00%	100.00%

=== 2020 census ===
As of the 2020 census, the county had a population of 2,460. The median age was 41.4 years, with 22.8% of residents under 18 and 22.1% aged 65 or older. For every 100 females there were 101.6 males, and for every 100 females age 18 and over there were 99.2 males. 0.0% of residents lived in urban areas while 100.0% lived in rural areas.

The racial makeup of the county was 88.8% White, 1.7% Black or African American, 0.5% American Indian and Alaska Native, 0.7% Asian, 0.2% Native Hawaiian and Pacific Islander, 1.2% from some other race, and 7.0% from two or more races. Hispanic or Latino residents of any race comprised 3.5% of the population.

There were 965 households in the county, of which 28.0% had children under the age of 18 living with them and 22.0% had a female householder with no spouse or partner present. About 29.4% of all households were made up of individuals and 14.5% had someone living alone who was 65 years of age or older.

There were 1,153 housing units, of which 16.3% were vacant. Among occupied housing units, 69.6% were owner-occupied and 30.4% were renter-occupied. The homeowner vacancy rate was 1.9% and the rental vacancy rate was 13.3%.

=== 2000 census ===
As of the 2000 census, there were 3,278 people, 1,365 households, and 924 families residing in the county. The population density was 4 people per square mile (1.5 people/km^{2}). There were 1,643 housing units at an average density of 2 per square mile (0.77/km^{2}). The racial makeup of the county was 97.19% White, 0.21% Black or African American, 0.61% Native American, 0.27% Asian, 0.98% from other races, and 0.73% from two or more races. 2.04% of the population were Hispanic or Latino of any race.

There were 1,365 households, out of which 27.70% had children under the age of 18 living with them, 59.60% were married couples living together, 5.30% had a female householder with no husband present, and 32.30% were non-families. 30.50% of all households were made up of individuals, and 15.50% had someone living alone who was 65 years of age or older. The average household size was 2.32 and the average family size was 2.89.

In the county, the population was spread out, with 24.00% under the age of 18, 8.20% from 18 to 24, 21.80% from 25 to 44, 24.60% from 45 to 64, and 21.30% who were 65 years of age or older. The median age was 42 years. For every 100 females there were 96.30 males. For every 100 females age 18 and over, there were 95.10 males.

The median income for a household in the county was $31,576, and the median income for a family was $40,950. Males had a median income of $29,063 versus $20,764 for females. The per capita income for the county was $17,207. About 7.40% of families and 10.80% of the population were below the poverty line, including 13.50% of those under age 18 and 8.70% of those age 65 or over.

== Government ==
=== Presidential elections ===
Presidential election results

United States presidential election results for Kiowa County, Kansas
Year	Republican		Democratic		Third party(ies)	
Year	No.	%	No.	%	No.	%
1888	525	50.34%	381	36.53%	137	13.14%
1892	398	50.44%	0	0.00%	391	49.56%
1896	250	49.80%	245	48.80%	7	1.39%
1900	322	51.52%	293	46.88%	10	1.60%
1904	494	59.23%	251	30.10%	89	10.67%
1908	699	59.49%	409	34.81%	67	5.70%
1912	276	19.59%	506	35.91%	627	44.50%
1916	901	40.97%	956	43.47%	342	15.55%
1920	1,411	69.51%	587	28.92%	32	1.58%
1924	1,541	70.08%	498	22.65%	160	7.28%
1928	1,929	82.09%	406	17.28%	15	0.64%
1932	1,306	52.24%	1,159	46.36%	35	1.40%
1936	1,280	47.32%	1,417	52.38%	8	0.30%
1940	1,571	64.10%	844	34.43%	36	1.47%
1944	1,479	69.60%	618	29.08%	28	1.32%
1948	1,258	59.79%	722	34.32%	124	5.89%
1952	1,838	78.61%	432	18.48%	68	2.91%
1956	1,717	76.18%	517	22.94%	20	0.89%
1960	1,662	74.56%	555	24.90%	12	0.54%
1964	1,135	53.29%	970	45.54%	25	1.17%
1968	1,484	70.87%	481	22.97%	129	6.16%
1972	1,559	76.35%	406	19.88%	77	3.77%
1976	1,180	59.48%	764	38.51%	40	2.02%
1980	1,433	72.16%	438	22.05%	115	5.79%
1984	1,537	79.51%	361	18.68%	35	1.81%
1988	1,276	71.09%	485	27.02%	34	1.89%
1992	1,057	55.90%	355	18.77%	479	25.33%
1996	1,264	70.97%	331	18.59%	186	10.44%
2000	1,262	78.48%	294	18.28%	52	3.23%
2004	1,275	81.47%	256	16.36%	34	2.17%
2008	912	80.35%	200	17.62%	23	2.03%
2012	976	85.31%	163	14.25%	5	0.44%
2016	900	83.41%	114	10.57%	65	6.02%
2020	980	84.12%	156	13.39%	29	2.49%
2024	941	85.00%	151	13.64%	15	1.36%

Like all of the High Plains, Kiowa County is Republican. The only Democrat to ever win a majority in the county has been Franklin D. Roosevelt in 1936, who ironically achieved the feat against incumbent Kansas governor Alf Landon. Woodrow Wilson won a plurality in 1916, but since 1944 only three Democrats have reached thirty percent of the county's vote, and Michael Dukakis in 1988 during a major drought and consequent farm crisis is the last Democrat to receive so much as twenty percent.

== Education ==
=== Colleges ===
- Barclay College, Haviland

=== Unified school districts ===
- Kiowa County USD 422
- Haviland USD 474

== Communities ==
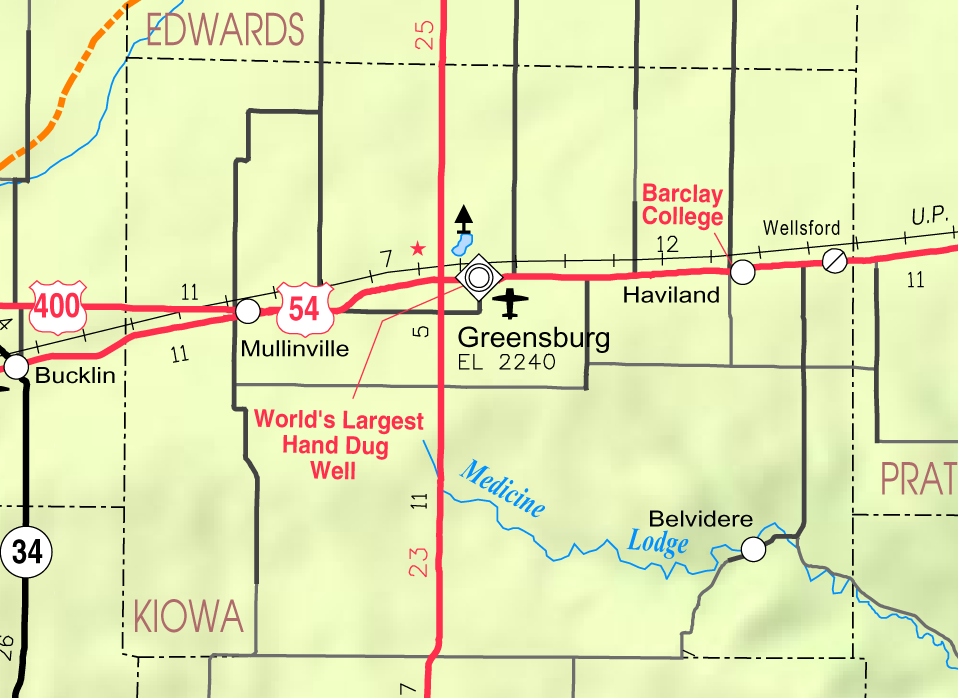
2005 map of Kiowa County (legend)

List of current townships / incorporated cities / unincorporated communities / extinct former communities within Kiowa County.

=== Incorporated cities ===
- Greensburg (county seat)
- Haviland
- Mullinville

=== Unincorporated communities ===
- Belvidere
- Brenham
- Joy
- Wellsford

=== Townships ===
Kiowa County has only one township, and none of the cities within the county are considered governmentally independent; all figures for the township include those of the cities.

Sources: 2000 U.S. Gazetteer from the U.S. Census Bureau.
Township	FIPS	Population	Population density /km^{2} (/sq mi)	Land area km^{2} (sq mi)	Water area km^{2} (sq mi)	Water %	Geographic coordinates
Kiowa Rural	37185	3,278	2 (5)	1,871 (722)	1 (0)	0.03%	37°33′32″N 99°17′09″W

== See also ==
Community information for Kansas

- Kansas locations by per capita income
- List of counties in Kansas
- List of townships in Kansas
- List of cities in Kansas
- List of unincorporated communities in Kansas
- List of ghost towns in Kansas
