= Agra, Kansas =

City in Phillips County, Kansas

- City
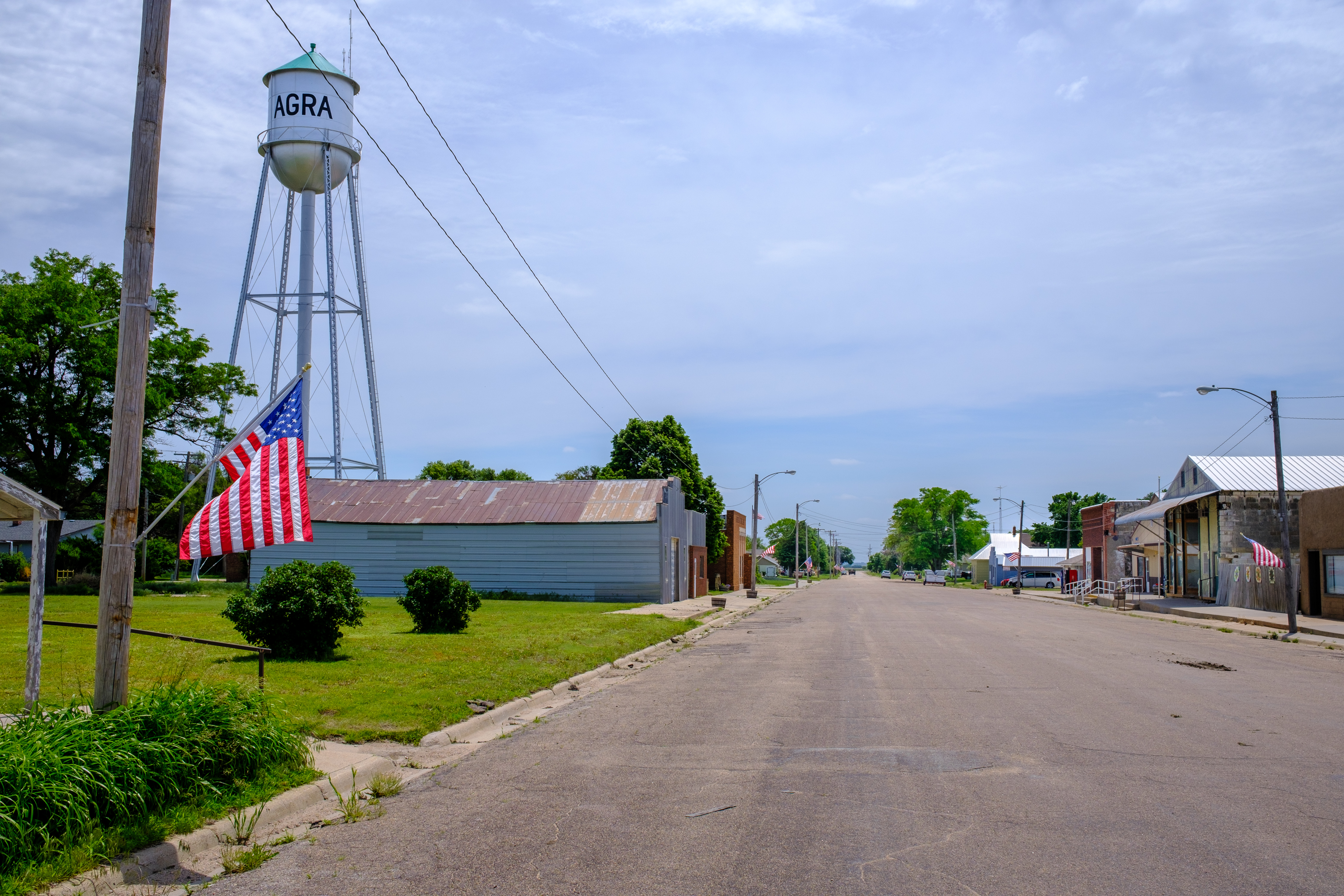
- Center Street (2021)

- Location within Phillips County and Kansas

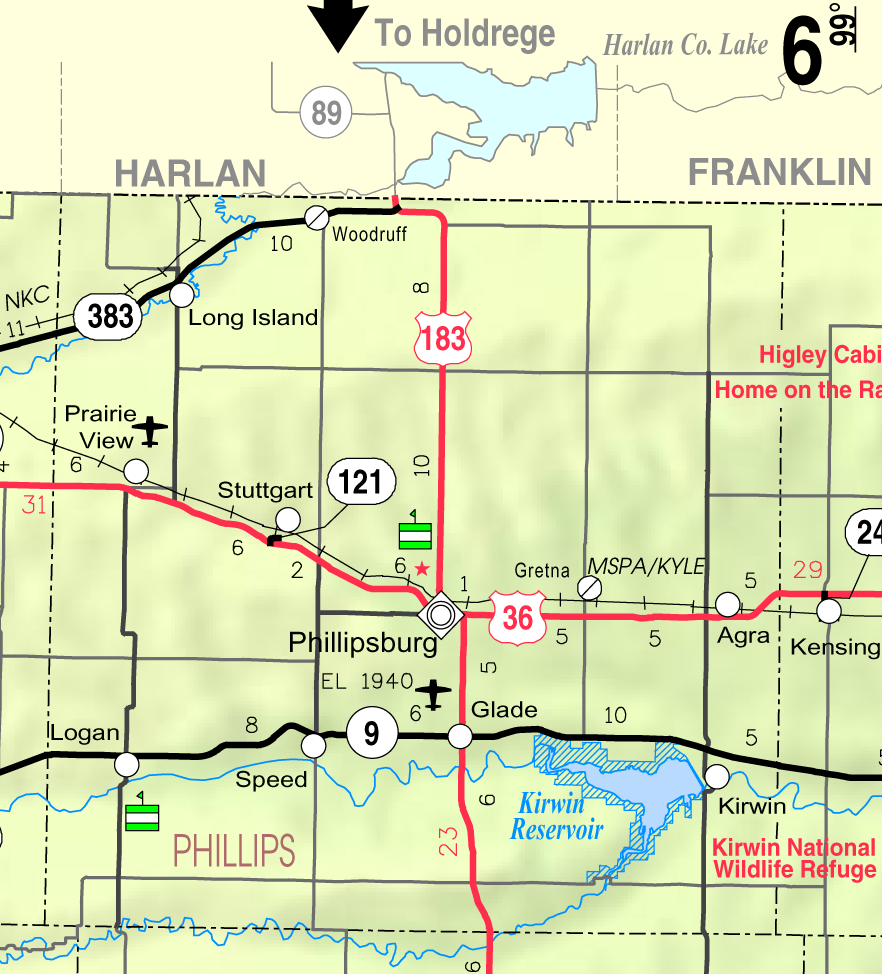
- KDOT map of Phillips County (legend)
- Coordinates: 39°45′41″N 99°07′10″W
- Country: United States
- State: Kansas
- County: Phillips
- Founded: 1888
- Incorporated: 1904
- Named for: Agra

Area
  - Total: 0.25 sq mi (0.65 km^{2})
  - Land: 0.25 sq mi (0.65 km^{2})
  - Water: 0 sq mi (0.00 km^{2})
- Elevation: 1,850 ft (560 m)

Population (2020)
  - Total: 208
  - Density: 830/sq mi (320/km^{2})
- Time zone: UTC-6 (CST)
  - Summer (DST): UTC-5 (CDT)
- ZIP Code: 67621
- Area code: 785
- FIPS code: 20-00550
- GNIS ID: 2393891

Agra is a city in Phillips County, Kansas, United States. As of the 2020 census, the population of the city was 208.

== History ==
Agra was first settled in 1888, and incorporated in 1904. Agra was a station on the Chicago, Rock Island and Pacific Railroad. It was named for Agra in India.

== Geography ==
According to the United States Census Bureau, the city has a total area of 0.27 square miles (0.70 km^{2}), all land.

== Demographics ==
Historical population
Census	Pop.	Note	%±
1910	347		—
1920	361		4.0%
1930	408		13.0%
1940	406		−0.5%
1950	354		−12.8%
1960	277		−21.8%
1970	294		6.1%
1980	321		9.2%
1990	322		0.3%
2000	306		−5.0%
2010	267		−12.7%
2020	208		−22.1%
U.S. Decennial Census

=== 2020 census ===
The 2020 United States census counted 208 people, 101 households, and 60 families in Agra. The population density was 835.3 per square mile (322.5/km^{2}). There were 146 housing units at an average density of 586.3 per square mile (226.4/km^{2}). The racial makeup was 92.31% (192) white or European American (90.87% non-Hispanic white), 0.0% (0) black or African-American, 0.96% (2) Native American or Alaska Native, 0.0% (0) Asian, 0.0% (0) Pacific Islander or Native Hawaiian, 1.44% (3) from other races, and 5.29% (11) from two or more races. Hispanic or Latino of any race was 6.25% (13) of the population.

Of the 101 households, 13.9% had children under the age of 18; 46.5% were married couples living together; 26.7% had a female householder with no spouse or partner present. 38.6% of households consisted of individuals and 18.8% had someone living alone who was 65 years of age or older. The average household size was 1.8 and the average family size was 2.4. The percent of those with a bachelor's degree or higher was estimated to be 9.1% of the population.

13.9% of the population was under the age of 18, 5.3% from 18 to 24, 19.7% from 25 to 44, 28.8% from 45 to 64, and 32.2% who were 65 years of age or older. The median age was 54.0 years. For every 100 females, there were 92.6 males. For every 100 females ages 18 and older, there were 103.4 males.

The 2016–2020 5-year American Community Survey estimates show that the median household income was $38,333 (with a margin of error of +/- $8,008) and the median family income was $63,750 (+/- $13,355). Males had a median income of $43,125 (+/- $10,547) versus $16,250 (+/- $4,133) for females. The median income for those above 16 years old was $22,500 (+/- $11,206). Approximately, 1.7% of families and 10.6% of the population were below the poverty line, including 0.0% of those under the age of 18 and 4.9% of those ages 65 or over.

=== 2010 census ===
As of the census of 2010, there were 267 people, 116 households, and 78 families residing in the city. The population density was 988.9 inhabitants per square mile (381.8/km^{2}). There were 162 housing units at an average density of 600.0 per square mile (231.7/km^{2}). The racial makeup of the city was 95.1% White, 0.4% African American, 1.9% Native American, 0.4% Asian, and 2.2% from two or more races. Hispanic or Latino of any race were 2.2% of the population.

There were 116 households, of which 25.0% had children under the age of 18 living with them, 56.0% were married couples living together, 6.0% had a female householder with no husband present, 5.2% had a male householder with no wife present, and 32.8% were non-families. 30.2% of all households were made up of individuals, and 13.8% had someone living alone who was 65 years of age or older. The average household size was 2.30 and the average family size was 2.86.

The median age in the city was 49.4 years. 23.2% of residents were under the age of 18; 6.4% were between the ages of 18 and 24; 14.6% were from 25 to 44; 36.7% were from 45 to 64; and 19.1% were 65 years of age or older. The gender makeup of the city was 51.3% male and 48.7% female.

== Education ==
The community is served by Thunder Ridge USD 110 public school district, where schools are located in Kensington and Agra. In 2008 West Smith County USD 238 and Eastern Heights USD 324 combined to form Thunder Ridge USD 110. The Thunder Ridge High School mascot is the Thunder Ridge Longhorns.

Agra schools were closed through school unification. The Agra High School mascot was Agra Purple Chargers.
