= List of unified school districts in Kansas =

This is a list of unified school districts (USD) in the state of Kansas. It is grouped by county, based on the headquarters location of each school district.

All school districts in Kansas are independent governments. Kansas has no public K-12 school systems dependent on another layer of government like a county government or a municipal government.

== List of school districts by county ==
=== Allen County ===
- Humboldt USD 258
- Iola USD 257
- Marmaton Valley USD 256

=== Anderson County ===
- Crest USD 479
- Garnett USD 365

=== Atchison County ===
- Atchison County USD 377
- Atchison USD 409

=== Barber County ===
- Barber County North USD 254
- South Barber USD 255

=== Barton County ===
- Ellinwood USD 355
- Great Bend USD 428
- Hoisington USD 431

=== Bourbon County ===
- Fort Scott USD 234
- Uniontown USD 235

=== Brown County ===
- Hiawatha USD 415
- South Brown County USD 430

=== Butler County ===
- Andover USD 385
- Augusta USD 402
- Bluestem USD 205
- Circle USD 375
- Douglass USD 396
- El Dorado USD 490
- Flinthills USD 492
- Remington USD 206
- Rose Hill USD 394

=== Chase County ===
- Chase County USD 284

=== Chautauqua County ===
- Cedar Vale USD 285
- Chautauqua County USD 286

=== Cherokee County ===
- Baxter Springs USD 508
- Columbus USD 493
- Galena USD 499
- Riverton USD 404

=== Cheyenne County ===
- Cheylin USD 103
- St. Francis USD 297

=== Clark County ===
- Ashland USD 220
- Minneola USD 219

=== Clay County ===
- Clay County USD 379

=== Cloud County ===
- Concordia USD 333
- Southern Cloud USD 334(dissolving in 2026)

=== Coffey County ===
- Burlington USD 244
- Lebo–Waverly USD 243
- LeRoy–Gridley USD 245(Southern Coffey County)

=== Comanche County ===
- Comanche County USD 300

=== Cowley County ===
- Arkansas City USD 470
- Central USD 462
- Dexter USD 471
- Udall USD 463
- Winfield USD 465

=== Crawford County ===
- Frontenac USD 249
- Girard USD 248
- Northeast USD 246
- Pittsburg USD 250
- Southeast USD 247

=== Decatur County ===
- Oberlin USD 294

=== Dickinson County ===
- Abilene USD 435
- Chapman USD 473
- Herington USD 487
- Rural Vista USD 481
- Solomon USD 393

=== Doniphan County ===
- Doniphan West USD 111
- Riverside USD 114
- Troy USD 429

=== Douglas County ===
- Baldwin City USD 348
- Eudora USD 491
- Lawrence USD 497

=== Edwards County ===
- Kinsley–Offerle USD 347
- Lewis USD 502(K-6)

=== Elk County ===
- Elk Valley USD 283
- West Elk USD 282

=== Ellis County ===
- Ellis USD 388
- Hays USD 489
- Victoria USD 432

=== Ellsworth County ===
- Central Plains USD 112
- Ellsworth USD 327

=== Finney County ===
- Garden City USD 457
- Holcomb USD 363

=== Ford County ===
- Bucklin USD 459
- Dodge City USD 443
- Spearville USD 381

=== Franklin County ===
- Central Heights USD 288
- Ottawa USD 290
- Wellsville USD 289
- West Franklin USD 287

=== Geary County ===
- Geary County USD 475

=== Gove County ===
- Grinnell USD 291(5-8)
- Quinter USD 293
- Wheatland USD 292(9-12)

=== Graham County ===
- Graham County USD 281

=== Grant County ===
- Ulysses USD 214

=== Gray County ===
- Cimarron–Ensign USD 102
- Copeland USD 476
- Ingalls USD 477
- Montezuma USD 371

=== Greeley County ===
- Greeley County USD 200

=== Greenwood County ===
- Eureka USD 389
- Hamilton USD 390
- Madison–Virgil USD 386

=== Hamilton County ===
- Syracuse USD 494

=== Harper County ===
- Attica USD 511
- Chaparral USD 361

=== Harvey County ===
- Burrton USD 369
- Halstead–Bentley USD 440
- Hesston USD 460
- Newton USD 373
- Sedgwick USD 439

=== Haskell County ===
- Satanta USD 507
- Sublette USD 374

=== Hodgeman County ===
- Hodgeman County USD 227

=== Jackson County ===
- Holton USD 336
- Jackson Heights USD 335
- Royal Valley USD 337

=== Jefferson County ===
- Jefferson County North USD 339
- Jefferson West USD 340
- McLouth USD 342
- Oskaloosa USD 341
- Perry–Lecompton USD 343
- Valley Falls USD 338

=== Jewell County ===
- Rock Hills USD 107

=== Johnson County ===
- Blue Valley USD 229
- De Soto USD 232
- Gardner–Edgerton USD 231
- Olathe USD 233
- Shawnee Mission USD 512
- Spring Hill USD 230

=== Kearny County ===
- Deerfield USD 216
- Lakin USD 215

=== Kingman County ===
- Cunningham–West Kingman County USD 332
- Kingman–Norwich USD 331

=== Kiowa County ===
- Haviland USD 474(K-8)
- Kiowa County USD 422

=== Labette County ===
- Chetopa–St. Paul USD 505
- Labette County USD 506
- Oswego USD 504
- Parsons USD 503

=== Lane County ===
- Dighton USD 482

=== Leavenworth County ===
- Basehor–Linwood USD 458
- Easton USD 449
- Fort Leavenworth USD 207
- Lansing USD 469
- Leavenworth USD 453
- Tonganoxie USD 464

=== Lincoln County ===
- Lincoln USD 298
- Sylvan–Lucas USD 299

=== Linn County ===
- Jayhawk USD 346
- Pleasanton USD 344
- Prairie View USD 362

=== Logan County ===
- Oakley USD 274
- Triplains USD 275

=== Lyon County ===
- Emporia USD 253
- North Lyon County USD 251
- Southern Lyon County USD 252

=== Marion County ===
- Centre USD 397
- Goessel USD 411
- Hillsboro USD 410
- Marion–Florence USD 408
- Peabody–Burns USD 398

=== Marshall County ===
- Marysville USD 364
- Valley Heights USD 498
- Vermillion USD 380

=== McPherson County ===
- Canton–Galva USD 419
- Inman USD 448
- McPherson USD 418
- Moundridge USD 423
- Smoky Valley USD 400

=== Meade County ===
- Fowler USD 225
- Meade USD 226

=== Miami County ===
- Louisburg USD 416
- Osawatomie USD 367
- Paola USD 368

=== Mitchell County ===
- Beloit USD 273
- Waconda USD 272

=== Montgomery County ===
- Caney Valley USD 436
- Cherryvale USD 447
- Coffeyville USD 445
- Independence USD 446

=== Morris County ===
- Morris County USD 417

=== Morton County ===
- Elkhart USD 218
- Rolla USD 217

=== Nemaha County ===
- Nemaha Central USD 115
- Prairie Hills USD 113

=== Neosho County ===
- Chanute USD 413
- Erie–Galesburg USD 101

=== Ness County ===
- Ness City USD 303
- Western Plains USD 106

=== Norton County ===
- Northern Valley USD 212
- Norton USD 211

=== Osage County ===
- Burlingame USD 454
- Lyndon USD 421
- Marais des Cygnes Valley USD 456
- Osage City USD 420
- Santa Fe Trail USD 434

=== Osborne County ===
- Osborne USD 392

=== Ottawa County ===
- North Ottawa County USD 239
- Twin Valley USD 240

=== Pawnee County ===
- Fort Larned USD 495
- Pawnee Heights USD 496

=== Phillips County ===
- Logan USD 326
- Phillipsburg USD 325
- Thunder Ridge USD 110

=== Pottawatomie County ===
- Kaw Valley USD 321
- Onaga USD 322
- Rock Creek USD 323
- Wamego USD 320

=== Pratt County ===
- Pratt USD 382
- Skyline USD 438

=== Rawlins County ===
- Rawlins County USD 105

=== Reno County ===
- Buhler USD 313
- Fairfield USD 310
- Haven USD 312
- Hutchinson USD 308
- Nickerson–South Hutchinson USD 309
- Pretty Prairie USD 311

=== Republic County ===
- Pike Valley USD 426
- Republic County USD 109

=== Rice County ===
- Chase–Raymond USD 401
- Little River–Windom USD 444
- Lyons USD 405
- Sterling USD 376

=== Riley County ===
- Blue Valley USD 384
- Manhattan–Ogden USD 383
- Riley County USD 378

=== Rooks County ===
- Palco USD 269
- Plainville USD 270
- Stockton USD 271

=== Rush County ===
- La Crosse USD 395
- Otis–Bison USD 403

=== Russell County ===
- Natoma–Paradise–Waldo USD 399
- Russell County USD 407

=== Saline County ===
- Ell–Saline USD 307
- Salina USD 305
- Southeast of Saline USD 306

=== Scott County ===
- Scott County USD 466

=== Sedgwick County ===
- Cheney USD 268
- Clearwater USD 264
- Derby USD 260
- Goddard USD 265
- Haysville USD 261
- Maize USD 266
- Mulvane USD 263
- Renwick USD 267
- Valley Center USD 262
- Wichita USD 259

=== Seward County ===
- Southwestern Heights USD 483
- Liberal USD 480

=== Shawnee County ===
- Auburn–Washburn USD 437
- Seaman USD 345
- Shawnee Heights USD 450
- Silver Lake USD 372
- Topeka USD 501

=== Sheridan County ===
- Hoxie USD 412

=== Sherman County ===
- Goodland USD 352

=== Smith County ===
- Smith Center USD 237

=== Stafford County ===
- Macksville USD 351
- St. John–Hudson USD 350
- Stafford USD 349

=== Stanton County ===
- Stanton County USD 452

=== Stevens County ===
- Hugoton USD 210
- Moscow USD 209

=== Sumner County ===
- Argonia USD 359
- Belle Plaine USD 357
- Caldwell USD 360
- Conway Springs USD 356
- Oxford USD 358
- South Haven USD 509
- Wellington USD 353

=== Thomas County ===
- Brewster USD 314
- Colby USD 315
- Golden Plains USD 316

=== Trego County ===
- WaKeeney USD 208

=== Wabaunsee County ===
- Mission Valley USD 330
- Wabaunsee USD 329

=== Wallace County ===
- Wallace County USD 241
- Weskan USD 242

=== Washington County ===
- Barnes–Hanover–Linn USD 223
- Clifton–Clyde USD 224
- Washington County USD 108

=== Wichita County ===
- Leoti–Wichita County USD 467

=== Wilson County ===
- Altoona–Midway USD 387
- Fredonia USD 484
- Neodesha USD 461

=== Woodson County ===
- Woodson USD 366

=== Wyandotte County ===
- Bonner Springs–Edwardsville USD 204
- Kansas City USD 500
- Piper USD 203
- Turner USD 202

== District changes ==
The number of students in rural communities dropped significantly throughout the 20th century. As farming technology progressed from animal power to small tractors towards large tractors over time, it allowed a farmer to support significantly more farm land. In turn, this led to fewer farm families, which led to fewer rural students. In combination with a loss of young men during foreign wars and rural flight, all of these caused an incremental population shrinkage of rural communities over time. In 1945 (after World War II), the School Reorganization Act in Kansas caused the consolidation of thousands of rural school districts in Kansas (mostly one room rural school houses). In 1963, the School Unification Act in Kansas caused the further consolidation of thousands of tiny school districts into hundreds of larger unified school districts.

The following list is not complete.

=== Renamed ===
- Cherokee USD 247 changed name to Southeast USD 247 in 2007.
- Greensburg USD 422 changed name to Kiowa County USD 422 in the 2010s.
- Jetmore USD 227 changed name to Hodgeman County USD 227 in the 2000s.
- Kismet–Plains USD 483 changed name to Southwestern Heights USD 483 in ?
- Mill Creek Valley USD 329 changed name to Wabaunsee USD 329 in 2016.
- Paradise USD 399 changed name to Natoma–Paradise–Waldo USD 399 in ?
- Wabaunsee East USD 330 changed name to Mission Valley USD 330 in 2004.

=== Dissolved ===
- Hanston USD 228 dissolved to merge into Jetmore USD 227 in 2011, which at some point was renamed to Hodgeman County USD 227.
- Healy USD 468 dissolved to merge into Scott County USD 466 in summer 2025.
- Jewell USD 279 dissolved and split to merge into Beloit USD 273 and Rock Hills USD 107 on July 1, 2009.
- Morland USD 280 dissolved to merge into Hill City USD 281 in 2002.
- Mullinville USD 424 dissolved to merge into Kiowa County USD 422 in 2011.
- Nes Tre La Go USD 301 dissolved and split to merge into Western Plains USD 106 and Ness City USD 303 in 2005.
- Prairie Heights USD 295 dissolved and split to merge into Hoxie USD 412 and Oberlin USD 294 on July 1, 2006.
- West Solomon USD 213 dissolved to merge into Norton USD 211 on July 1, 2010.

Future

- Southern Cloud USD 334 is set to dissolve before fall 2026. Details of how it will be split into surrounding school districts have not been finalized.

=== Consolidated ===
This lists school districts that merged to form a new school district. The number of consolidations is half the size of this list because every district is listed on the left side.

- Atwood USD 318 and Herndon USD 317 consolidated to form Rawlins County USD 105 in 2003.
- Axtell USD 488 and Sabetha-Wetmore USD 441 consolidated to form Prairie Hills USD 113 on July 1, 2010.
- B & B USD 451 and Nemaha Valley USD 442 consolidated to form Nemaha Central USD 115 on July 31, 2011.
- Bazine USD 304 and Ransom USD 302 consolidated to form Western Plains USD 106 in 2004.
- Belleville USD 427 and Hillcrest USD 455 consolidated to form Republic County USD 109 in 2006.
- Claflin USD 354 and Lorraine USD 328 consolidated to form Central Plains USD 112 on July 1, 2010.
- Eastern Heights USD 324 and West Smith County USD 238 consolidated to form Thunder Ridge USD 110 on July 1, 2008.
- Elwood USD 486 and Wathena USD 406 consolidated to form Riverside USD 114 on July 1, 2010.
- Herndon USD 317 and Atwood USD 318 consolidated to form Rawlins County USD 105 in 2003.
- Highland USD 425 and Midway-Denton USD 433 consolidated to form Doniphan West USD 111 in 2009.
- Hillcrest USD 455 and Belleville USD 427 consolidated to form Republic County USD 109 in 2006.
- Lorraine USD 328 and Claflin USD 328 consolidated to form Central Plains USD 112 on July 1, 2010.
- Mankato USD 278 and White Rock USD 104 consolidated to form Rock Hills USD 107 in 2006.
- Midway-Denton USD 433 and Highland USD 425 consolidated to form Doniphan West USD 111 in 2009.
- Nemaha Valley USD 442 and B & B USD 451 consolidated to form Nemaha Central USD 115 on July 31, 2011.
- North Central USD 221 and Washington USD 222 consolidated to form Washington County USD 108 in 2006.
- Ransom USD 302 and Bazine USD 304 consolidated to form Western Plains USD 106 in 2004.
- Sabetha-Wetmore USD 441 and Axtell USD 488 consolidated to form Prairie Hills USD 113 on July 1, 2010.
- Washington USD 222 and North Central USD 221 consolidated to form Washington County USD 108 in 2006.
- Wathena USD 406 and Elwood USD 486 consolidated to form Riverside USD 114 on July 1, 2010.
- West Smith County USD 238 and Eastern Heights USD 324 consolidated to form Thunder Ridge USD 110 on July 1, 2008.
- White Rock USD 104 and Mankato USD 278 consolidated to form Rock Hills USD 107 in 2006.

== See also ==
- Kansas State Department of Education
- Kansas State High School Activities Association
- List of high schools in Kansas
- Education in Kansas
