= Mullinville, Kansas =

City in Kiowa County, Kansas

- City
- Location within Kiowa County and Kansas

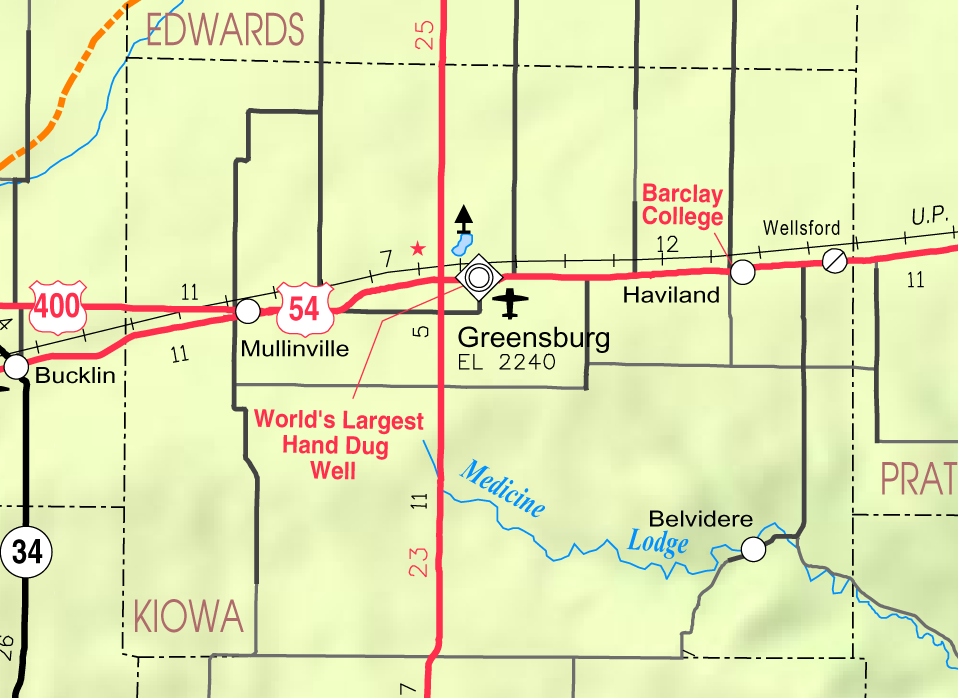
- KDOT map of Kiowa County (legend)
- Coordinates: 37°35′19″N 99°28′32″W
- Country: United States
- State: Kansas
- County: Kiowa
- Founded: 1880s
- Platted: 1886
- Incorporated: 1911
- Named for: Alfred Mullin

Area
  - Total: 0.64 sq mi (1.66 km^{2})
  - Land: 0.64 sq mi (1.66 km^{2})
  - Water: 0 sq mi (0.00 km^{2})
- Elevation: 2,326 ft (709 m)

Population (2020)
  - Total: 197
  - Density: 307/sq mi (119/km^{2})
- Time zone: UTC-6 (CST)
  - Summer (DST): UTC-5 (CDT)
- ZIP Code: 67109
- Area code: 620
- FIPS code: 20-49075
- GNIS ID: 485627
- Website: City website

Mullinville is a city in Kiowa County, Kansas, United States. As of the 2020 census, the population of the city was 197.

== History ==
The first post office at Mullinville was established in September 1884.

Mullinville was laid out in about 1886. It was named for Alfred A. Mullin, a pioneer settler and storekeeper.

=== 1915 Tornado ===
On June 5, 1915, a violent F5 tornado hit Mullinville, causing no fatalities nor injuries.

== Geography ==
According to the United States Census Bureau, the city has a total area of 0.60 square miles (1.55 km^{2}), all of it land.

== Demographics ==
Historical population
Census	Pop.	Note	%±
1890	79		—
1910	289		—
1920	361		24.9%
1930	436		20.8%
1940	428		−1.8%
1950	410		−4.2%
1960	385		−6.1%
1970	376		−2.3%
1980	339		−9.8%
1990	289		−14.7%
2000	279		−3.5%
2010	255		−8.6%
2020	197		−22.7%
U.S. Decennial Census

=== 2020 census ===
The 2020 United States census counted 197 people, 75 households, and 56 families in Mullinville. The population density was 307.3 per square mile (118.7/km^{2}). There were 105 housing units at an average density of 163.8 per square mile (63.2/km^{2}). The racial makeup was 87.82% (173) white or European American (86.8% non-Hispanic white), 1.52% (3) black or African-American, 0.51% (1) Native American or Alaska Native, 0.0% (0) Asian, 0.0% (0) Pacific Islander or Native Hawaiian, 0.51% (1) from other races, and 9.64% (19) from two or more races. Hispanic or Latino of any race was 5.58% (11) of the population.

Of the 75 households, 32.0% had children under the age of 18; 66.7% were married couples living together; 13.3% had a female householder with no spouse or partner present. 22.7% of households consisted of individuals and 9.3% had someone living alone who was 65 years of age or older. The average household size was 2.0 and the average family size was 2.8. The percent of those with a bachelor's degree or higher was estimated to be 3.6% of the population.

20.3% of the population was under the age of 18, 7.1% from 18 to 24, 25.9% from 25 to 44, 23.9% from 45 to 64, and 22.8% who were 65 years of age or older. The median age was 39.9 years. For every 100 females, there were 99.0 males. For every 100 females ages 18 and older, there were 93.8 males.

The 2016–2020 5-year American Community Survey estimates show that the median household income was $56,518 (with a margin of error of +/- $7,854) and the median family income was $67,727 (+/- $5,792). Males had a median income of $51,719 (+/- $16,568) versus $15,625 (+/- $14,638) for females. The median income for those above 16 years old was $37,222 (+/- $6,705). Approximately, 1.4% of families and 3.0% of the population were below the poverty line, including 0.0% of those under the age of 18 and 0.0% of those ages 65 or over.

=== 2010 census ===
As of the census of 2010, there were 255 people, 107 households, and 68 families residing in the city. The population density was 425.0 inhabitants per square mile (164.1/km^{2}). There were 132 housing units at an average density of 220.0 per square mile (84.9/km^{2}). The racial makeup of the city was 94.9% White, 0.8% African American, 0.4% Native American, 0.8% Asian, 1.6% from other races, and 1.6% from two or more races. Hispanic or Latino of any race were 8.2% of the population.

There were 107 households, of which 27.1% had children under the age of 18 living with them, 52.3% were married couples living together, 7.5% had a female householder with no husband present, 3.7% had a male householder with no wife present, and 36.4% were non-families. 32.7% of all households were made up of individuals, and 19.6% had someone living alone who was 65 years of age or older. The average household size was 2.38 and the average family size was 2.99.

The median age in the city was 41.3 years. 26.3% of residents were under the age of 18; 5.4% were between the ages of 18 and 24; 23.6% were from 25 to 44; 21.6% were from 45 to 64; and 23.1% were 65 years of age or older. The gender makeup of the city was 49.4% male and 50.6% female.

== Education ==
The community is served by Kiowa County USD 422 public school district. Mullinville is home to 21st Century Learning Academy, an accredited virtual school of the same school district. In 2011, USD 422 absorbed the former Mullinville USD 424, which had dissolved.

The Mullinville High School mascot was Tigers. The Mullinville Tigers won the following Kansas State High School championships:

- 1953 Boys Track & Field - Class B
- 1964 Boys Basketball - Class BB
- 1981 Boys Basketball - Class 1A

== Notable people ==
- M.T. Liggett (1930–2017), American folk sculptor; born in Mullinville

== Gallery ==
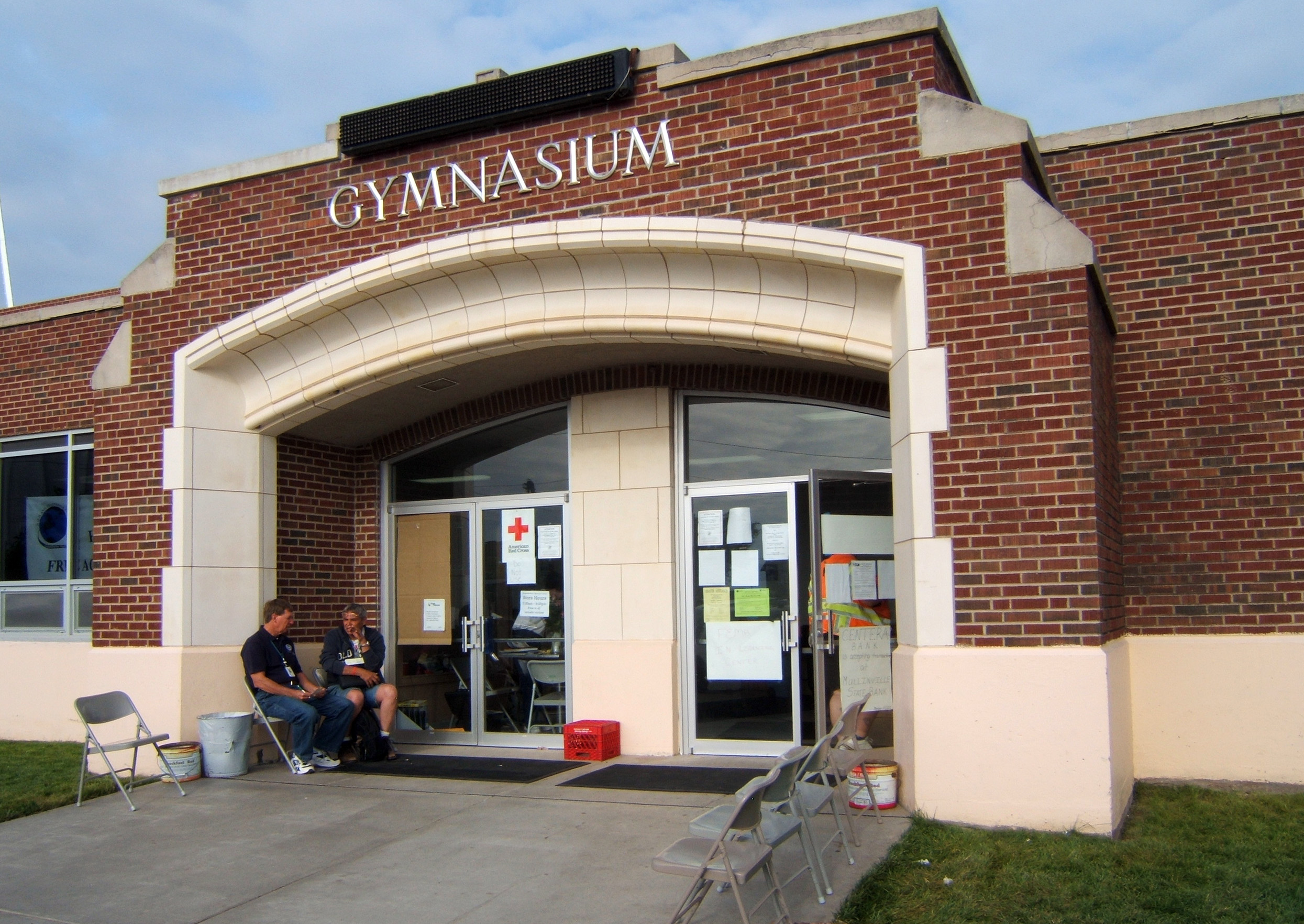
Gym shelter on May 5, 2007, the day after an F5 tornado devastated neighboring Greensburg

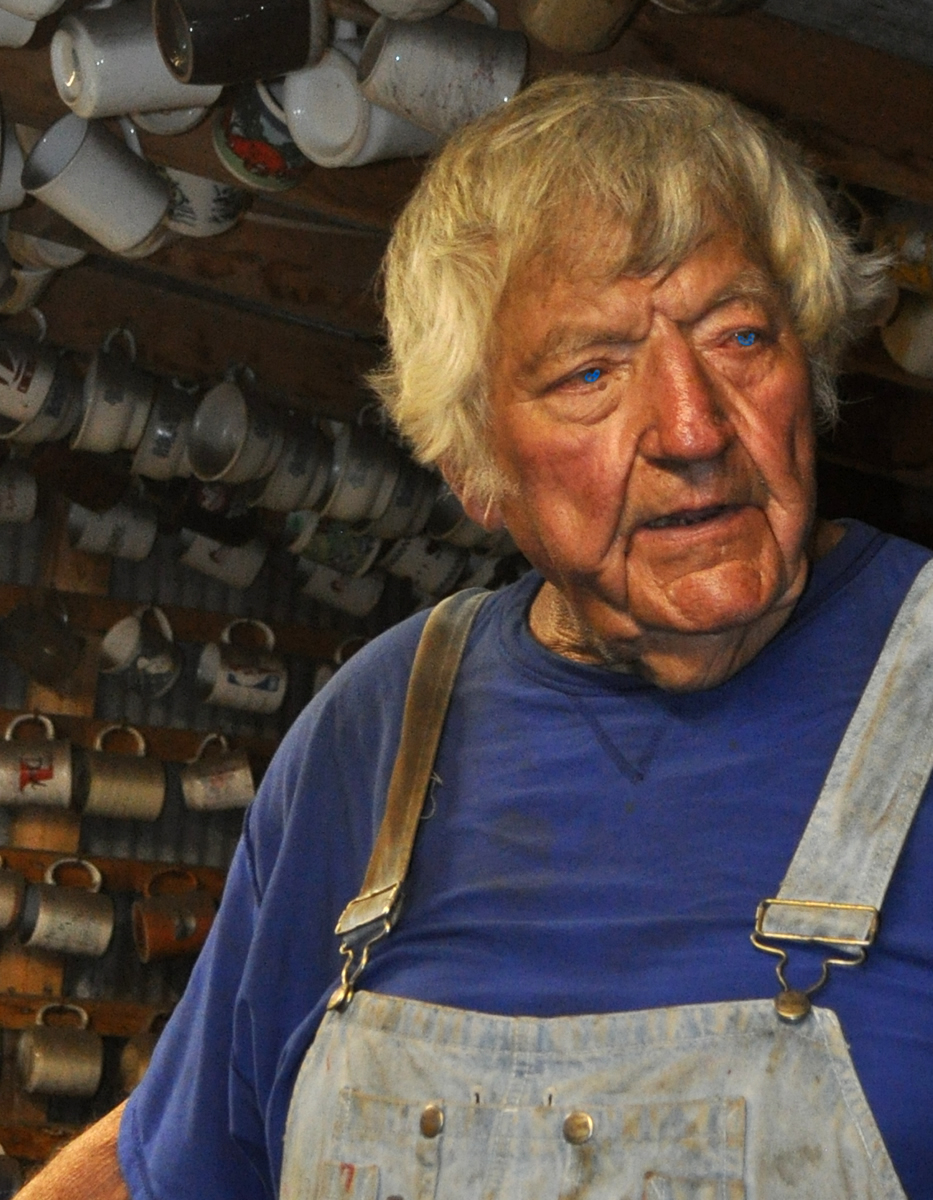
M.T. Liggett as he appears in his workshop in Mullinville (2013)
