= Riverside USD 114 =

Public school district in Elwood, Kansas

Address
- 1409 Vermont St. Elwood, Kansas, 66024; United States
- Coordinates: 39°45′24″N 94°53′17″W

District information
- Type: Public
- Grades: K to 12
- Schools: 4

Other information
- Website: usd114.org

Riverside USD 114 is a public unified school district headquartered in Elwood, Kansas, United States. The district includes the communities of Elwood, Wathena, Blair, and nearby rural areas.

== Schools ==
The school district operates the following schools:

- Riverside High School
- Riverside Middle School
- Riverside Elementary School

== History ==
It was formed in 2010 by the merger of Wathena USD 406 and Elwood USD 486.

== See also ==
- Kansas State Department of Education
- Kansas State High School Activities Association
- List of high schools in Kansas
- List of unified school districts in Kansas
