= M. T. Liggett =

American sculptor

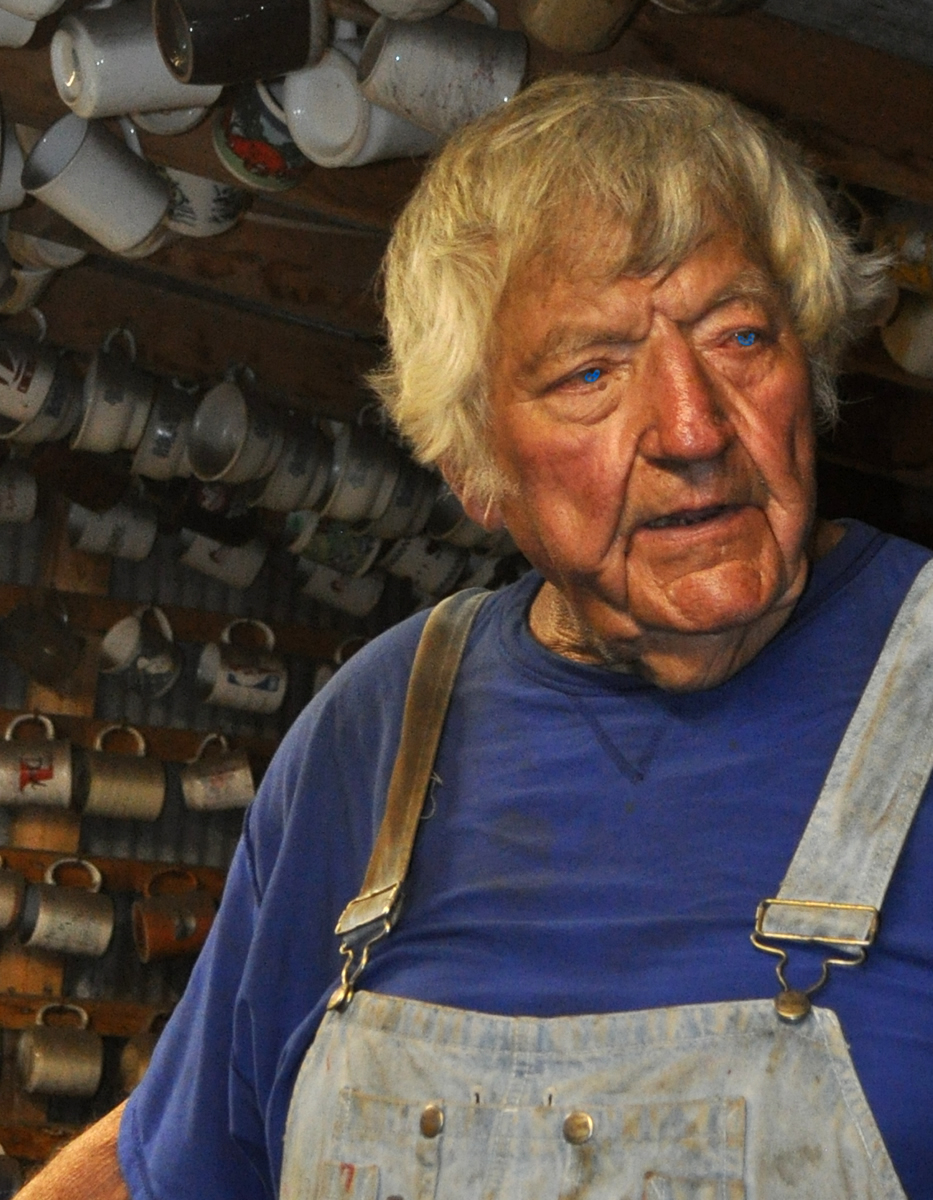
- M.T. Liggett in his workshop (2013)
- Born: Myron Thomas Liggett; December 28, 1930; Mullinville, Kansas
- Died: August 17, 2017 (aged 86); Wichita, Kansas
- Education: Mullinville High School
- Alma mater: Dodge City Community College
- Known for: Sculptor
- Style: Folk art

Myron Thomas Liggett (December 28, 1930 – August 17, 2017) was an American folk sculptor.

Liggett was born in Mullinville, Kansas and grew up on his family farm. He graduated from Mullinville High School. Liggett went to Dodge City Community College. He also went to the University of Texas where he majored in political science. Liggett served in the United States Navy in 1948 and then joined the United States Air Force in 1957. In 1987, Liggett returned to Mullinville, Kansas where he exhibited his art work containing re-used farm implements, welded metal and combined discs. His works were kinetic and moved with the wind. His political artwork leaned toward the conservative side. He received his bachelor's degree from Fort Hays State University and went to the University of Nevada, Las Vegas law school.

M. T. Liggett's main venue was the land along his front fence, on the north side of U.S. Route 400 in Mullinville. He was also a featured artist at the Folk Art Museum in Lucas, Kansas.

He and some of his sculptures appear in the 2009 documentary What's the Matter with Kansas?, a 2013 episode of the television series American Pickers, and in the 2022 documentary It Started with a Horse.

Liggett died on August 17, 2017, at the age of 86 at Wesley Medical Center in Wichita, Kansas.
