= Brenham, Kansas =

Unincorporated community in Kiowa County, Kansas

- Unincorporated community
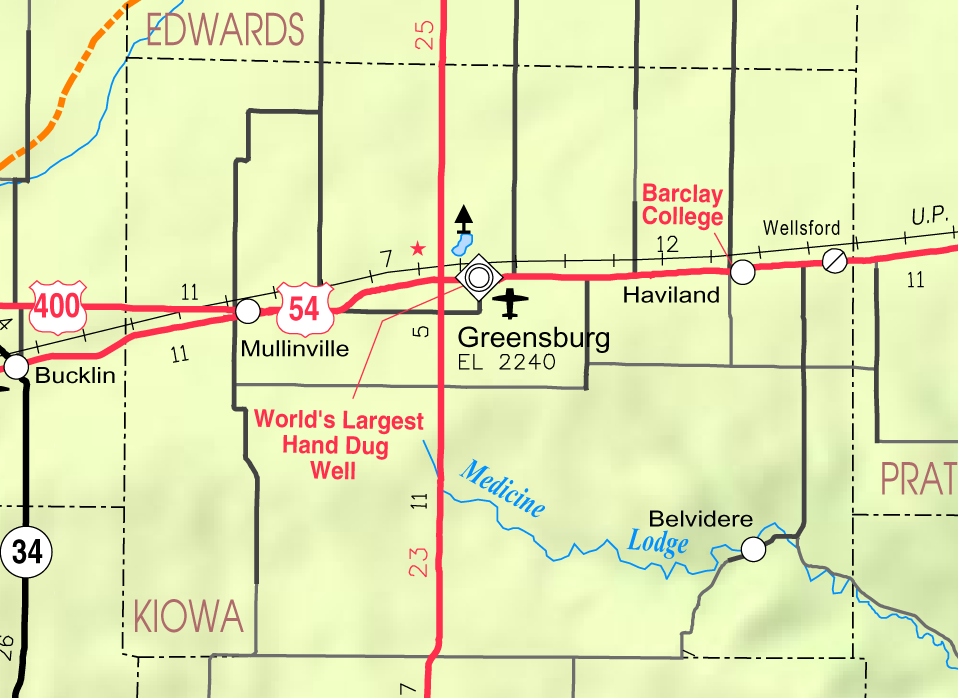
- KDOT map of Kiowa County (legend)

- Location within Kansas Location within the United States
- Coordinates: 37°36′35″N 99°12′29″W
- Country: United States
- State: Kansas
- County: Kiowa
- Founded: 1880s
- Elevation: 2,198 ft (670 m)
- Time zone: UTC-6 (CST)
  - Summer (DST): UTC-5 (CDT)
- Area code: 620
- FIPS code: 20-08325
- GNIS ID: 484673

Brenham is an unincorporated community in Kiowa County, Kansas, United States.

== History ==
Brenham had a post office from 1884 until 1894.

== Education ==
The community is served by Kiowa County USD 422 public school district.
