= Southern Cloud USD 334 =

Public school district in Miltonvale, Kansas

Address
- 619 W. Tootle Ave. Miltonvale, Kansas, 67466; United States
- Coordinates: 39°20′47″N 97°27′27″W

District information
- Type: Public
- Grades: K to 12
- Schools: 1

Other information
- Website: sc334.org

Southern Cloud USD 334 is a public unified school district headquartered in Miltonvale, Kansas, United States. The district includes the communities of Miltonvale, Glasco, and nearby rural areas. This school district will be dissolving by fall 2026.

== History ==
The school district previously operated Glasco Jr/Sr High School and Miltonvale Jr/Sr High School. Those schools were closed at the end of the 2023-2024 school year.

Southern Cloud USD 334 is set to be dissolved before fall 2026. Clay County USD 379 and Clifton–Clyde USD 224 are expected to take on a majority of the USD 334 jurisdiction, but as of February 2025 discussions are still underway with surrounding districts.

== Schools ==
The school district operates the following schools:

- Glasco Grade School

=== Closed schools ===
- Glasco Jr/Sr High School (closed in 2024)
- Miltonvale Jr/Sr High School (closed in 2024)
- Miltonvale Grade School (closed in 2024)

== See also ==
- Kansas State Department of Education
- Kansas State High School Activities Association
- List of high schools in Kansas
- List of unified school districts in Kansas
