= Blair, Kansas =

Unincorporated community in Doniphan County, Kansas

Coordinates: 39°47′02″N 95°00′10″W

Blair is an unincorporated community in Doniphan County, Kansas, United States.

== History ==
A post office was opened in Blair in 1908, and remained in operation until it was discontinued in 1957.

== Education ==
The community is served by Riverside USD 114 public school district.
