= Kiowa County USD 422 =

Public school district in Greensburg, Kansas

Address
- 710 S. Main St. Greensburg, Kansas, 67054; United States
- Coordinates: 37°35′56″N 99°17′29″W

District information
- Type: Public
- Grades: K to 12
- Schools: 3

Other information
- Website: usd422.org

Kiowa County USD 422 is a public unified school district headquartered in Greensburg, Kansas, United States. The district includes the communities of Greensburg, Mullinville, Brenham, Joy, and nearby rural areas.

== Schools ==
The school district operates the following schools:

- Kiowa County High School
- Kiowa County Junior High School
- Kiowa County Elementary School

== History ==
In 2011 it absorbed the former Mullinville USD 424, which had dissolved.

== See also ==
- Kansas State Department of Education
- Kansas State High School Activities Association
- List of high schools in Kansas
- List of unified school districts in Kansas
