= Thunder Ridge USD 110 =

Public school district in Kensington, Kansas

Address
- 128 S. Kansas Ave. Kensington, Kansas, 66951; United States
- Coordinates: 39°45′57″N 99°1′43″W

District information
- Type: Public
- Grades: K to 12
- Schools: 3

Other information
- Website: usd110.net

Thunder Ridge USD 110 is a public unified school district headquartered in Kensington, Kansas, United States. The district includes the communities of Kensington, Athol, Agra, Kirwin, and nearby rural areas.

== Schools ==
The school district operates the following schools:

- Thunder Ridge High School in Kensington.
- Thunder Ridge Middle School in Agra.
- Thunder Ridge Elementary School in Kensington.

== History ==
In 2008, West Smith County USD 238 and Eastern Heights USD 324 merged to form Thunder Ridge USD 110.

== See also ==
- Kansas State Department of Education
- Kansas State High School Activities Association
- List of high schools in Kansas
- List of unified school districts in Kansas
