= Kensington, Kansas =

City in Smith County, Kansas

- City
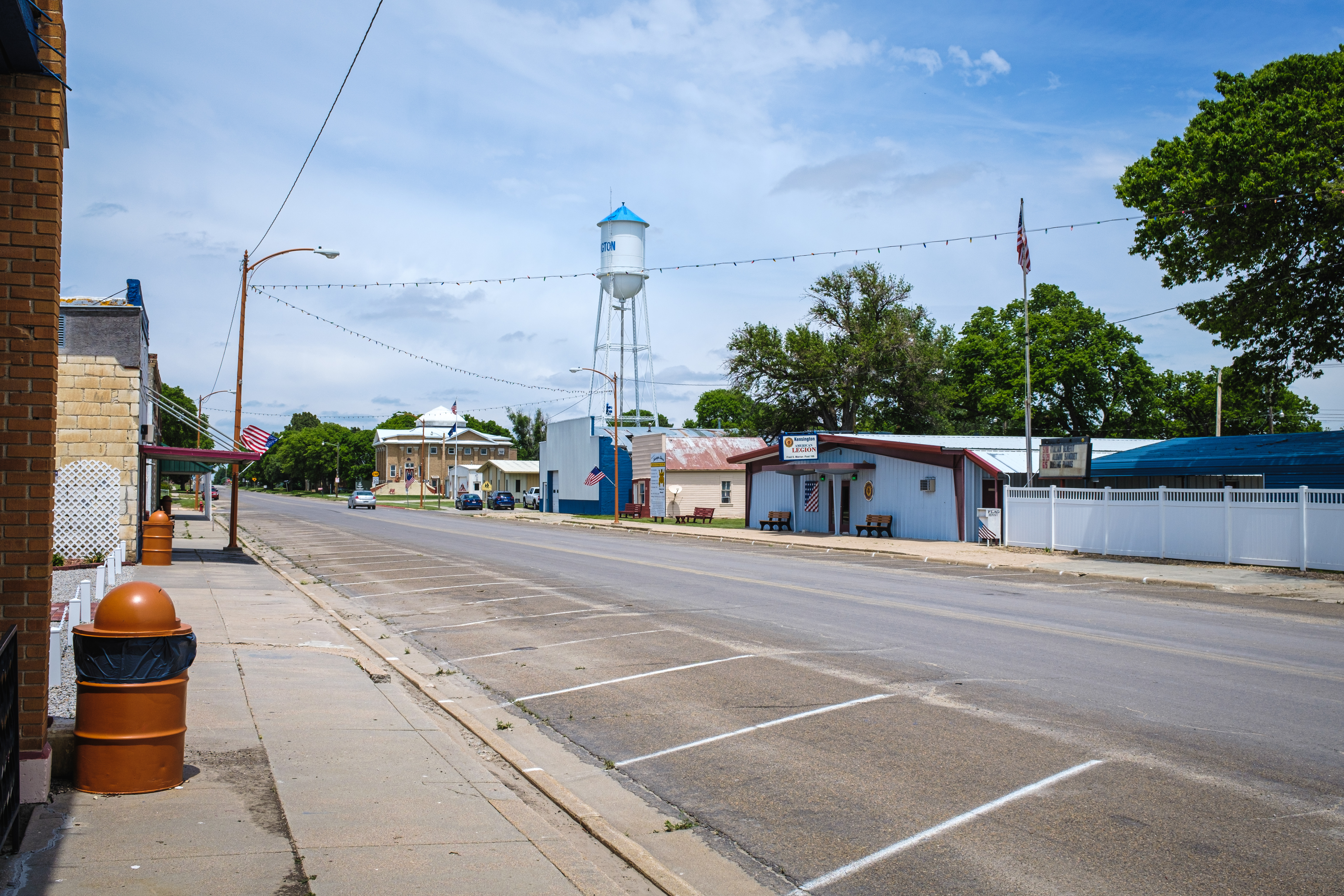
- Kensington in 2021

- Location within Smith County and Kansas

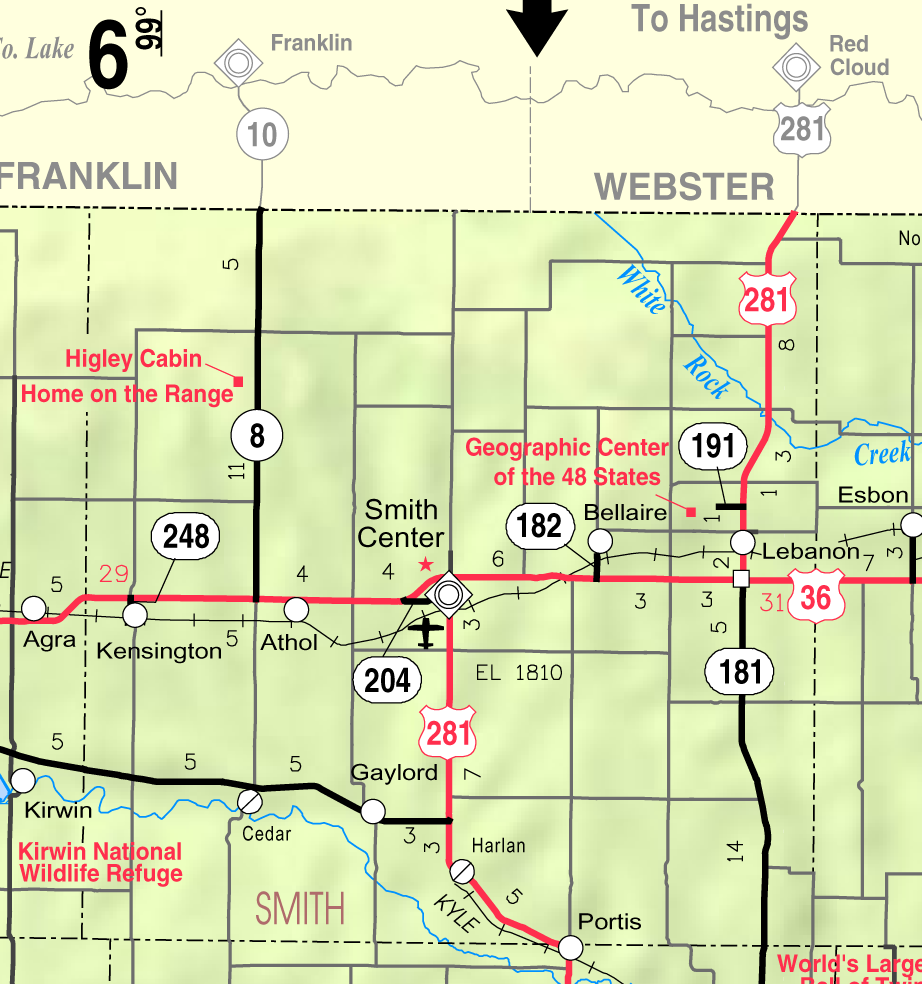
- KDOT map of Smith County (legend)
- Coordinates: 39°46′00″N 99°01′58″W
- Country: United States
- State: Kansas
- County: Smith
- Founded: 1887
- Incorporated: 1900

Government
  - Type: Mayor–Council

Area
  - Total: 0.34 sq mi (0.87 km^{2})
  - Land: 0.34 sq mi (0.87 km^{2})
  - Water: 0 sq mi (0.00 km^{2})
- Elevation: 1,778 ft (542 m)

Population (2020)
  - Total: 399
  - Density: 1,200/sq mi (460/km^{2})
- Time zone: UTC-6 (CST)
  - Summer (DST): UTC-5 (CDT)
- ZIP Code: 66951
- Area code: 785
- FIPS code: 20-36550
- GNIS ID: 2395511
- Website: kensingtonks.net

Kensington is a city in Smith County, Kansas, United States. As of the 2020 census, the population of the city was 399.

== History ==
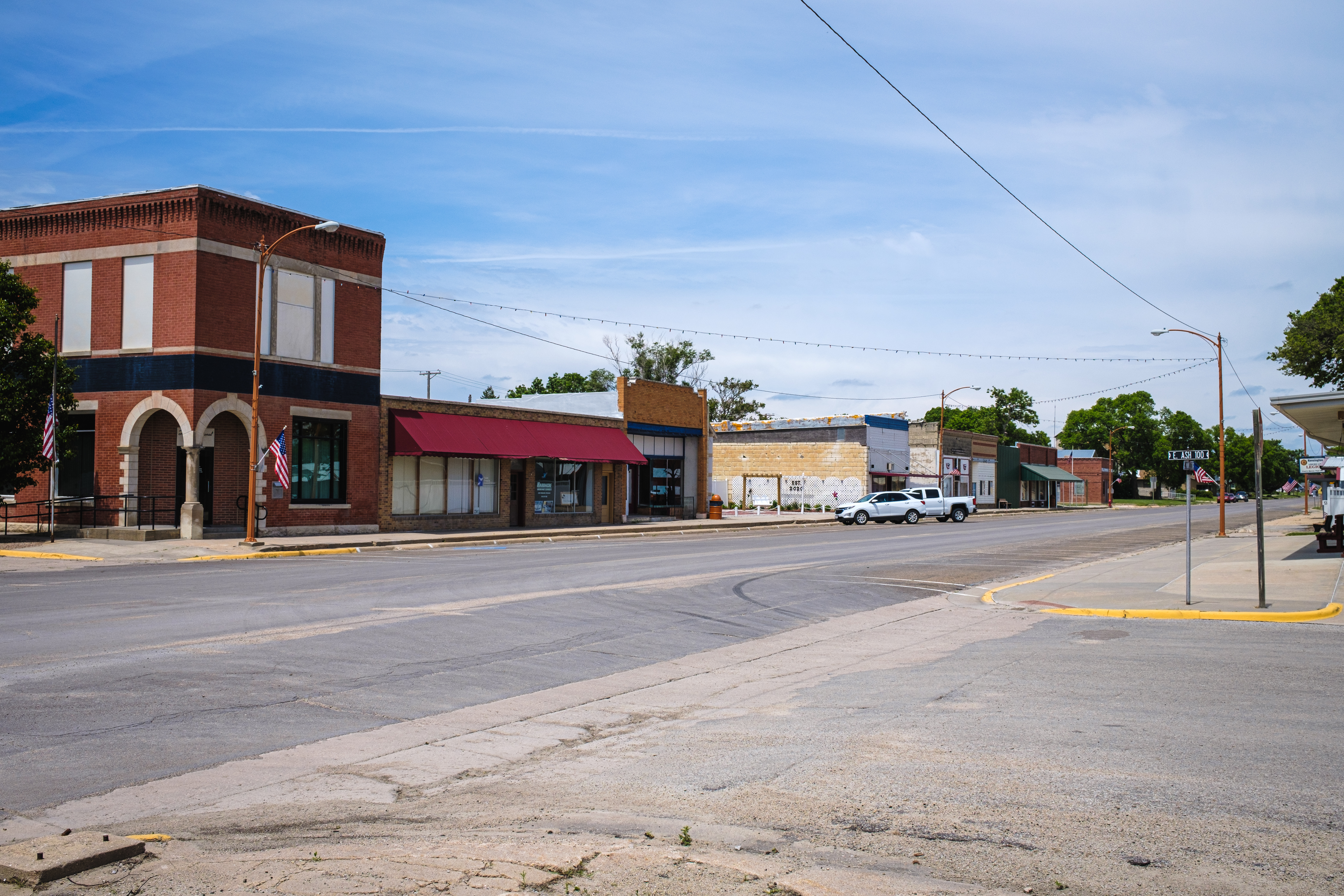
(2021)

Kensington was founded circa 1887. It was incorporated as a city in 1900.

Kensington was considered a discordant community in 1892. Many of the husbands and wives lived apart from each other and the society was deemed "broken up on account of it".

Kensington was located on the Chicago, Rock Island and Pacific Railroad.

The first post office in Kensington was established in January 1888.

== Geography ==
According to the United States Census Bureau, the city has a total area of 0.36 square miles (0.93 km^{2}), all land.

== Demographics ==
Historical population
Census	Pop.	Note	%±
1910	497		—
1920	595		19.7%
1930	546		−8.2%
1940	597		9.3%
1950	635		6.4%
1960	619		−2.5%
1970	653		5.5%
1980	681		4.3%
1990	553		−18.8%
2000	529		−4.3%
2010	473		−10.6%
2020	399		−15.6%
U.S. Decennial Census

=== 2020 census ===
The 2020 United States census counted 399 people, 181 households, and 109 families in Kensington. The population density was 1,191.0 per square mile (459.9/km^{2}). There were 237 housing units at an average density of 707.5 per square mile (273.2/km^{2}). The racial makeup was 94.74% (378) white or European American (94.74% non-Hispanic white), 0.75% (3) black or African-American, 0.25% (1) Native American or Alaska Native, 0.25% (1) Asian, 0.25% (1) Pacific Islander or Native Hawaiian, 0.25% (1) from other races, and 3.51% (14) from two or more races. Hispanic or Latino of any race was 1.0% (4) of the population.

Of the 181 households, 27.1% had children under the age of 18; 49.2% were married couples living together; 25.4% had a female householder with no spouse or partner present. 38.7% of households consisted of individuals and 19.9% had someone living alone who was 65 years of age or older. The average household size was 2.3 and the average family size was 2.8. The percent of those with a bachelor's degree or higher was estimated to be 14.5% of the population.

23.8% of the population was under the age of 18, 4.5% from 18 to 24, 20.6% from 25 to 44, 22.1% from 45 to 64, and 29.1% who were 65 years of age or older. The median age was 46.8 years. For every 100 females, there were 96.6 males. For every 100 females ages 18 and older, there were 109.7 males.

The 2016–2020 5-year American Community Survey estimates show that the median household income was $52,083 (with a margin of error of +/- $9,186) and the median family income was $68,125 (+/- $24,243). Males had a median income of $48,750 (+/- $9,723) versus $26,406 (+/- $8,666) for females. The median income for those above 16 years old was $35,819 (+/- $6,414). Approximately, 1.4% of families and 2.6% of the population were below the poverty line, including 4.3% of those under the age of 18 and 3.6% of those ages 65 or over.

=== 2010 census ===
As of the census of 2010, there were 473 people, 203 households, and 126 families living in the city. The population density was 1,313.9 inhabitants per square mile (507.3/km^{2}). There were 261 housing units at an average density of 725.0 per square mile (279.9/km^{2}). The racial makeup of the city was 97.7% White, 0.2% Native American, and 2.1% from two or more races. Hispanic or Latino of any race were 0.2% of the population.

There were 203 households, of which 23.6% had children under the age of 18 living with them, 53.2% were married couples living together, 4.9% had a female householder with no husband present, 3.9% had a male householder with no wife present, and 37.9% were non-families. 36.5% of all households were made up of individuals, and 23.1% had someone living alone who was 65 years of age or older. The average household size was 2.19 and the average family size was 2.78.

The median age in the city was 49.7 years. 21.6% of residents were under the age of 18; 4.2% were between the ages of 18 and 24; 18.6% were from 25 to 44; 26.6% were from 45 to 64; and 29% were 65 years of age or older. The gender makeup of the city was 46.3% male and 53.7% female.

== Government ==
The Kensington government consists of a mayor and five council members. The council meets the 2nd Monday of each month at 5:30PM.

- City Hall, 101 S Main.

== Education ==
The community is served by Thunder Ridge USD 110 public school district. In 2008 West Smith County USD 238 and Eastern Heights USD 324 combined to form Thunder Ridge USD 110. The Thunder Ridge High School mascot is the Thunder Ridge Longhorns.

Prior to school unification, the Kensington High School mascot was Kensington Goldbugs.
