= Greensburg, Kansas =

City in Kiowa County, Kansas

- City and County seat
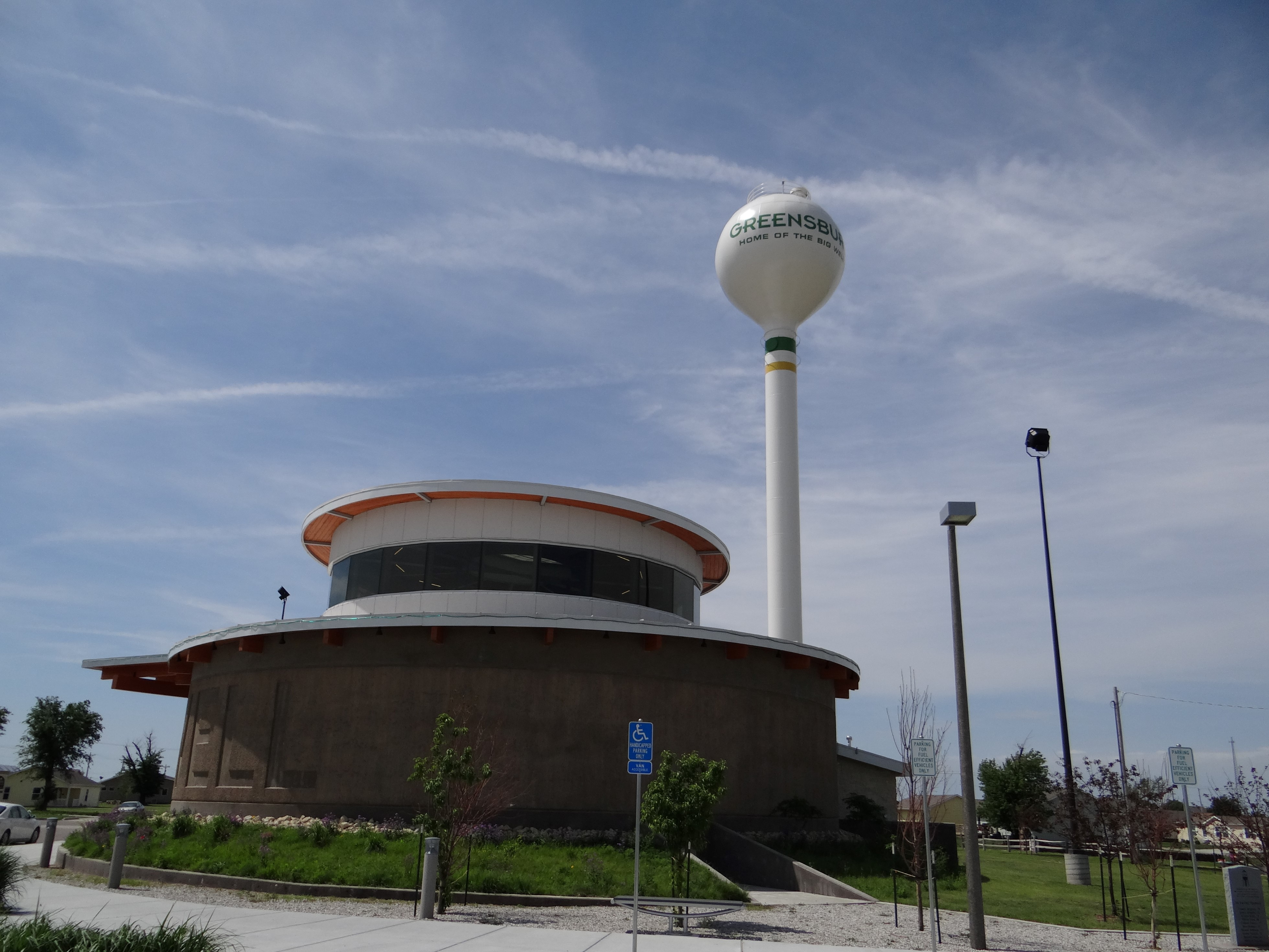
- Big Well Museum and Water Tower (2013)

- Location within Kiowa County and Kansas

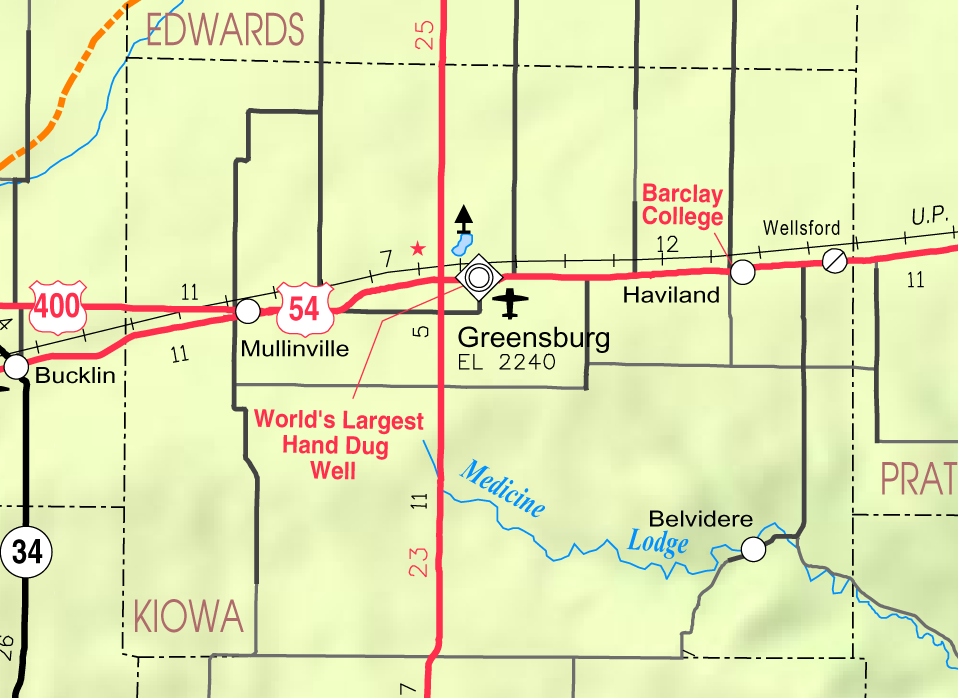
- KDOT map of Kiowa County (legend)
- Coordinates: 37°36′11″N 99°17′34″W
- Country: United States
- State: Kansas
- County: Kiowa
- Founded: 1885
- Incorporated: 1886
- Named for: D. R. Green

Government
  - Mayor: Matt Christenson

Area
  - Total: 1.79 sq mi (4.63 km^{2})
  - Land: 1.79 sq mi (4.63 km^{2})
  - Water: 0 sq mi (0.00 km^{2})
- Elevation: 2,234 ft (681 m)

Population (2020)
  - Total: 740
  - Density: 410/sq mi (160/km^{2})
- Time zone: UTC−6 (CST)
  - Summer (DST): UTC−5 (CDT)
- ZIP Code: 67054
- Area code: 620
- FIPS code: 20-28675
- GNIS ID: 485585
- Website: greensburgks.org

Greensburg is a city in and the county seat of Kiowa County, Kansas, United States. As of the 2020 United States census, the population of the city was 740. It is home to the world's largest hand-dug well.

On the evening of May 4, 2007, Greensburg was devastated by an EF5 tornado that damaged 95 percent of the city, with 112 houses in the city sustaining EF4+ level damage. The tornado, which was 1.7 miles wide when entering Greensburg, killed eleven people between the ages of 46 and 84. The community had a population of 2,000 people in the late 1990s, and 1,400 people before the tornado leveled the city. By 2010, over half of Greensburg's population before the tornado had moved away from the city. The new hospital, city hall, and school have all been built to the highest certification level issued by Leadership in Energy and Environmental Design (LEED).

== History ==
=== Early history ===
For millennia, the Great Plains of North America were inhabited by nomadic Native Americans.

The first settlement was established at Greensburg in 1885. Greensburg was named after D.R. "Cannonball" Green, who owned a stagecoach company and played a part in the establishment of the city. In 1887, construction began on the Big Well, the largest hand-dug well in the world. By 1888, Greensburg was proclaimed the "liveliest town in the state", the same year the construction of the Big Well was completed.

The city ceased using the Big Well as a water source in 1932, and converted it into a tourist attraction in 1937. In 1972, the Big Well was declared a national museum.

One of the largest pallasite meteorites ever discovered was found near Greensburg in 1949, weighing over 1,000 pounds.

=== 2007 tornado ===
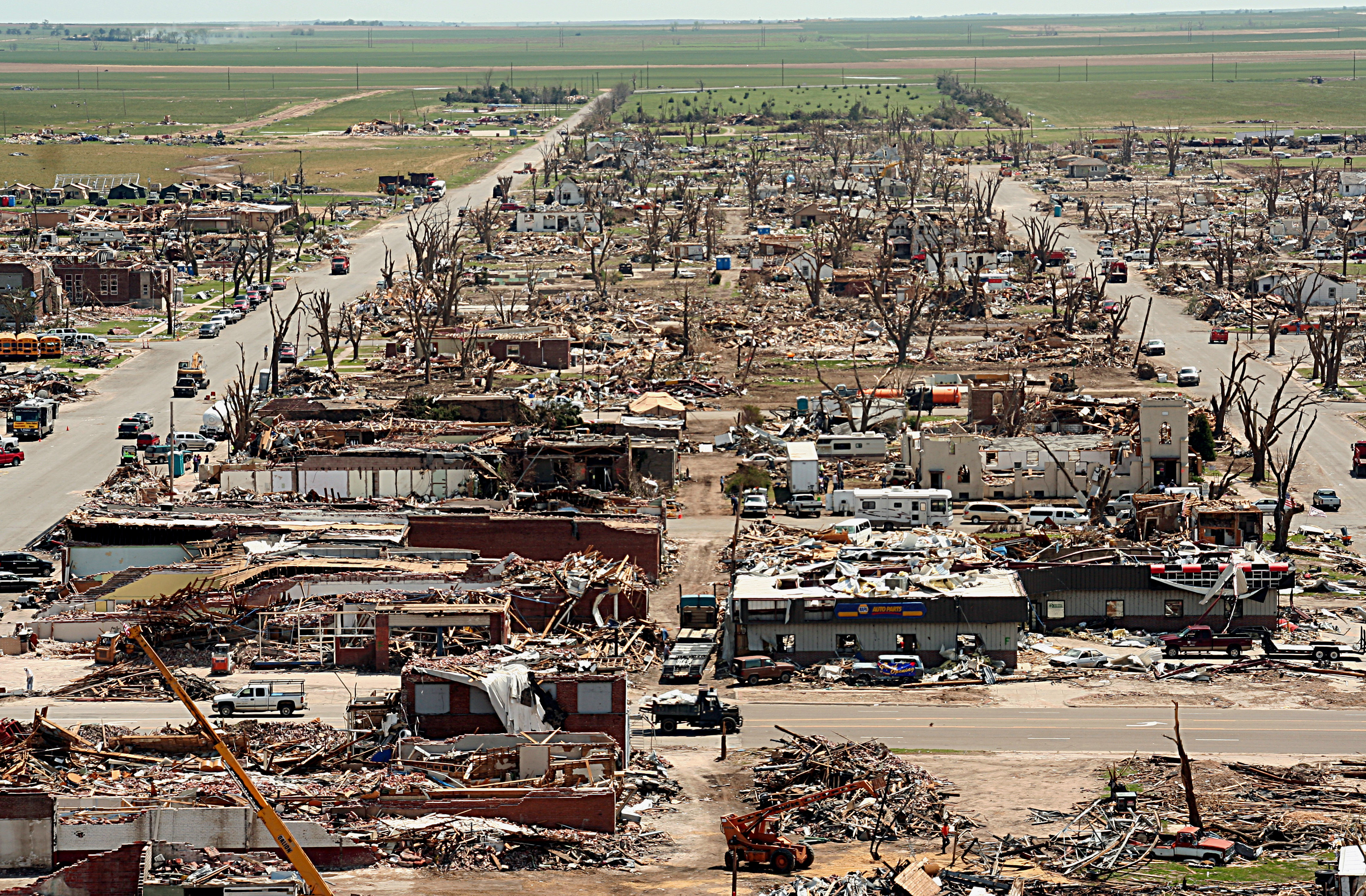
City center, twelve days after the tornado struck (2007)

At 9:45 p.m. CDT on May 4, 2007, during a deadly tornado outbreak, Greensburg took a direct hit from a large tornado. Tornado sirens sounded in the city twenty minutes before the tornado struck, and a tornado emergency was issued a few minutes prior to the tornado striking the city. Experts believe that the early activation of the sirens saved many lives. The tornado lasted for a total of one hour and five minutes and caused $250 million in damages.

The tornado killed 10 people in Greensburg and two more in neighboring communities. Two of those who died while hospitalized in the storm's aftermath had suffered head wounds during the storm. More than ninety percent of the town was either severely damaged or destroyed. The National Weather Service estimated winds of the tornado to reach 205 mph (330 km/h). Local Delmer Day Elementary School and Greensburg High School experienced failure of unreinforced masonry walls along window sills. At Kiowa County Memorial Hospital, one unit of steel rafter weighing 4,500 kilograms (9,900 lb) was blown off by the wind. It was the first tornado in history to be rated EF5 since the implementation of the Enhanced Fujita scale earlier that year. It was also the first F5 or EF5 classification since May 3, 1999, when an F5 tornado devastated Moore, Oklahoma during the 1999 Oklahoma tornado outbreak. Kansas Governor Kathleen Sebelius and President George W. Bush both declared Kiowa County a disaster area, which opened up the affected areas for national and international aid.

=== Rebuilding ===
After the tornado, Greensburg rebuilt itself as a "green" city. A non-profit organization called Greensburg GreenTown was founded to help inform the residents about the green living initiative.

In response to the disaster, the city council passed a resolution requiring all city buildings be built to LEED platinum standards, becoming the first city in the nation to do so. With extra help from the Federal Emergency Management Agency, Greensburg residents developed a long-term plan for Greensburg. The city's power is supplied by ten 1.25 MW wind-turbines. Carbon offsets generated from the turbines are being managed by NativeEnergy, and have been purchased by charter supporters including Ben & Jerry's, Clif Bar, Green Mountain Coffee Roasters, and Stonyfield Farm.

Despite the efforts to rebuild the town, the population by 2010 was about 50% of what it was in 2000. The 2000 census found 1,582 residents, while 777 residents were recorded in the 2010 census, and 740 in 2020.

== Geography ==
According to the United States Census Bureau, the city has a total area of 1.48 square miles (3.83 km^{2}), all land.

=== Climate ===
The climate in this area is characterized by hot, humid summers and generally mild to cool winters. Under the Köppen Climate Classification system, Greensburg has a humid subtropical climate, abbreviated "CFA" on climate maps.

Climate data for Greensburg, Kansas, 1991–2020 normals, extremes 1893–present
Month	Jan	Feb	Mar	Apr	May	Jun	Jul	Aug	Sep	Oct	Nov	Dec	Year
Record high °F (°C)	80 (27)	88 (31)	95 (35)	101 (38)	104 (40)	110 (43)	112 (44)	113 (45)	107 (42)	99 (37)	90 (32)	88 (31)	113 (45)
Mean maximum °F (°C)	66.4 (19.1)	72.9 (22.7)	81.4 (27.4)	88.1 (31.2)	93.6 (34.2)	98.7 (37.1)	103.4 (39.7)	101.4 (38.6)	97.4 (36.3)	89.6 (32.0)	76.0 (24.4)	66.3 (19.1)	104.5 (40.3)
Mean daily maximum °F (°C)	43.2 (6.2)	47.4 (8.6)	57.5 (14.2)	66.9 (19.4)	76.3 (24.6)	86.1 (30.1)	91.8 (33.2)	89.7 (32.1)	82.0 (27.8)	69.6 (20.9)	55.9 (13.3)	44.8 (7.1)	67.6 (19.8)
Daily mean °F (°C)	31.2 (−0.4)	34.7 (1.5)	43.9 (6.6)	53.1 (11.7)	63.6 (17.6)	73.6 (23.1)	79.0 (26.1)	77.0 (25.0)	68.9 (20.5)	56.0 (13.3)	43.0 (6.1)	33.2 (0.7)	54.8 (12.6)
Mean daily minimum °F (°C)	19.3 (−7.1)	22.0 (−5.6)	30.4 (−0.9)	39.3 (4.1)	50.9 (10.5)	61.1 (16.2)	66.3 (19.1)	64.4 (18.0)	55.7 (13.2)	42.4 (5.8)	30.0 (−1.1)	21.6 (−5.8)	41.9 (5.5)
Mean minimum °F (°C)	3.8 (−15.7)	7.0 (−13.9)	13.0 (−10.6)	24.4 (−4.2)	36.2 (2.3)	50.0 (10.0)	56.1 (13.4)	54.9 (12.7)	40.8 (4.9)	26.1 (−3.3)	13.7 (−10.2)	5.3 (−14.8)	−1.4 (−18.6)
Record low °F (°C)	−20 (−29)	−19 (−28)	−14 (−26)	7 (−14)	19 (−7)	37 (3)	48 (9)	40 (4)	23 (−5)	11 (−12)	−3 (−19)	−20 (−29)	−20 (−29)
Average precipitation inches (mm)	0.71 (18)	0.81 (21)	1.92 (49)	2.41 (61)	3.39 (86)	3.87 (98)	3.16 (80)	3.46 (88)	2.04 (52)	2.28 (58)	0.96 (24)	0.96 (24)	25.97 (659)
Average snowfall inches (cm)	4.5 (11)	2.6 (6.6)	3.8 (9.7)	0.0 (0.0)	0.0 (0.0)	0.0 (0.0)	0.0 (0.0)	0.0 (0.0)	0.0 (0.0)	0.4 (1.0)	1.4 (3.6)	3.6 (9.1)	16.3 (41)
Average precipitation days (≥ 0.01 in)	2.7	3.8	5.3	5.9	7.0	6.4	6.6	6.5	4.5	4.7	3.4	3.2	60.0
Average snowy days (≥ 0.1 in)	1.7	1.7	1.2	0.1	0.0	0.0	0.0	0.0	0.0	0.4	0.5	1.5	7.1
Source 1: NOAA
Source 2: National Weather Service

== Demographics ==
Historical population
Census	Pop.	Note	%±
1890	515		—
1900	343		−33.4%
1910	1,199		249.6%
1920	1,215		1.3%
1930	1,338		10.1%
1940	1,417		5.9%
1950	1,723		21.6%
1960	1,988		15.4%
1970	1,907		−4.1%
1980	1,885		−1.2%
1990	1,792		−4.9%
2000	1,574		−12.2%
2010	777		−50.6%
2020	740		−4.8%
U.S. Decennial Census

=== 2020 census ===
The 2020 United States census counted 740 people, 329 households, and 176 families in Greensburg. The population density was 413.6 per square mile (159.7/km^{2}). There were 403 housing units at an average density of 225.3 per square mile (87.0/km^{2}). The racial makeup was 88.65% (656) white or European American (87.43% non-Hispanic white), 2.3% (17) black or African-American, 0.27% (2) Native American or Alaska Native, 1.76% (13) Asian, 0.54% (4) Pacific Islander or Native Hawaiian, 0.41% (3) from other races, and 6.08% (45) from two or more races. Hispanic or Latino of any race was 2.57% (19) of the population.

Of the 329 households, 25.8% had children under the age of 18; 43.8% were married couples living together; 34.0% had a female householder with no spouse or partner present. 41.3% of households consisted of individuals and 21.0% had someone living alone who was 65 years of age or older. The average household size was 2.0 and the average family size was 3.0. The percent of those with a bachelor's degree or higher was estimated to be 19.5% of the population.

22.2% of the population was under the age of 18, 5.1% from 18 to 24, 23.9% from 25 to 44, 24.1% from 45 to 64, and 24.7% who were 65 years of age or older. The median age was 44.4 years. For every 100 females, there were 101.6 males. For every 100 females ages 18 and older, there were 114.1 males.

The 2016–2020 5-year American Community Survey estimates show that the median household income was $41,518 (with a margin of error of +/- $5,218) and the median family income was $61,250 (+/- $26,252). Males had a median income of $40,221 (+/- $4,038) versus $24,000 (+/- $11,825) for females. The median income for those above 16 years old was $32,868 (+/- $5,509). Approximately, 3.5% of families and 11.0% of the population were below the poverty line, including 13.8% of those under the age of 18 and 5.2% of those ages 65 or over.

=== 2010 census ===
As of the 2010 United States census, there were 777 people, 355 households, and 212 families in the city. The population density was 525.0 inhabitants per square mile (202.7/km^{2}). There were 431 housing units at an average density of 291.2 per square mile (112.4/km^{2}). The racial makeup of the city was 95.5% White, 0.4% African American, 1.0% Native American, 0.4% Asian, 1.4% from other races, and 1.3% from two or more races. Hispanic or Latino of any race were 3.9% of the population.

== Education ==
The community is served by Kiowa County USD 422 public school district. Greensburg schools were closed through school unification. The Greensburg Rangers won the Kansas State High School boys class B basketball championship in 1948.

As of the 2019 American Community Survey 5-Year Estimates, 82.35% of School Enrolled Population are Enrolled in Kindergarten to 12th Grade in Greensburg. 27.4% of residents have a High School or Equivalent degree, 27.4% have some college but no degree, 8.6% have an associate degree, 16.8% have a bachelor's degree, and 7.2% have a Graduates or Professional degree.

== Attractions ==
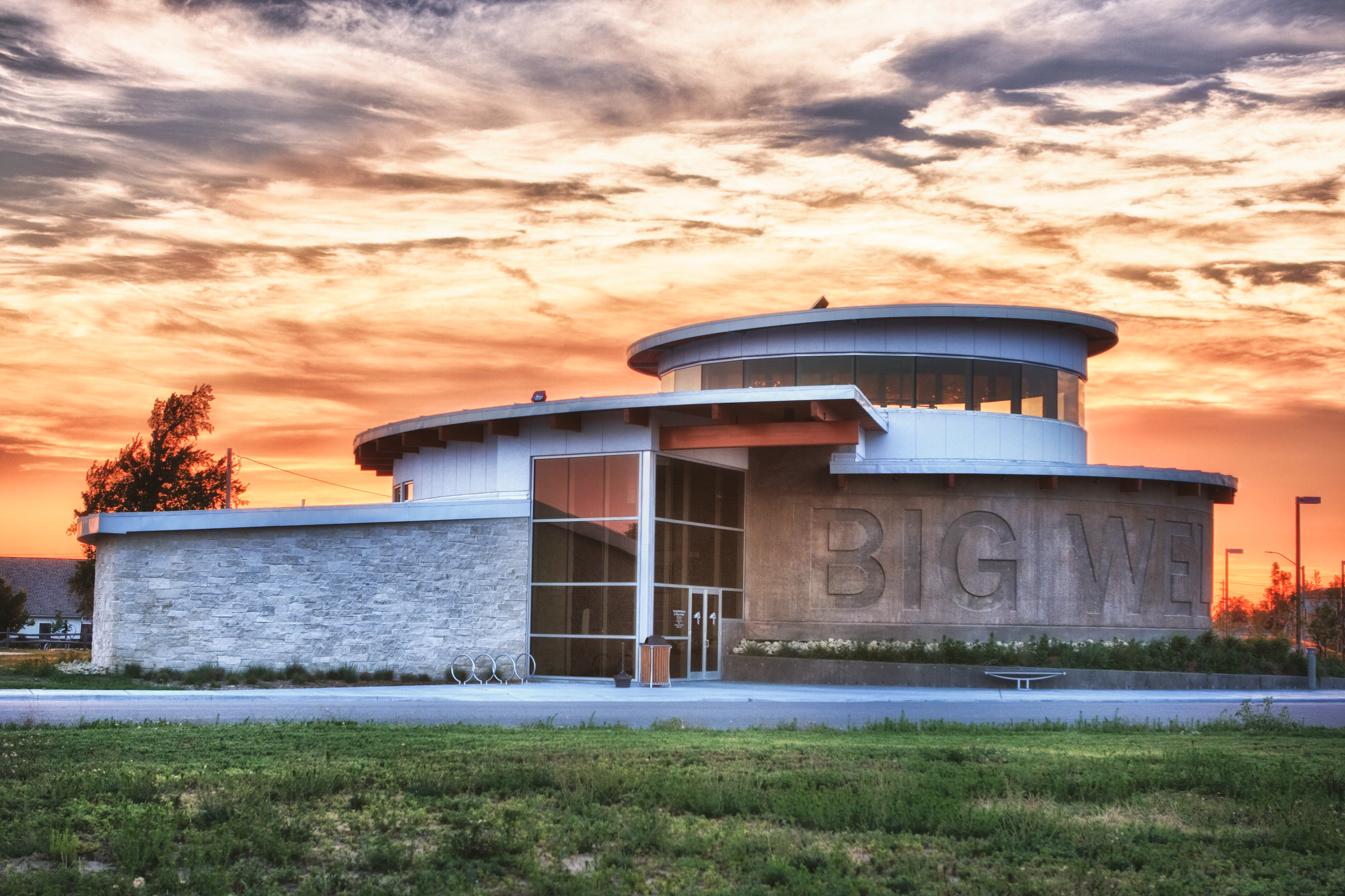
Big Well Museum & Visitor Info Center

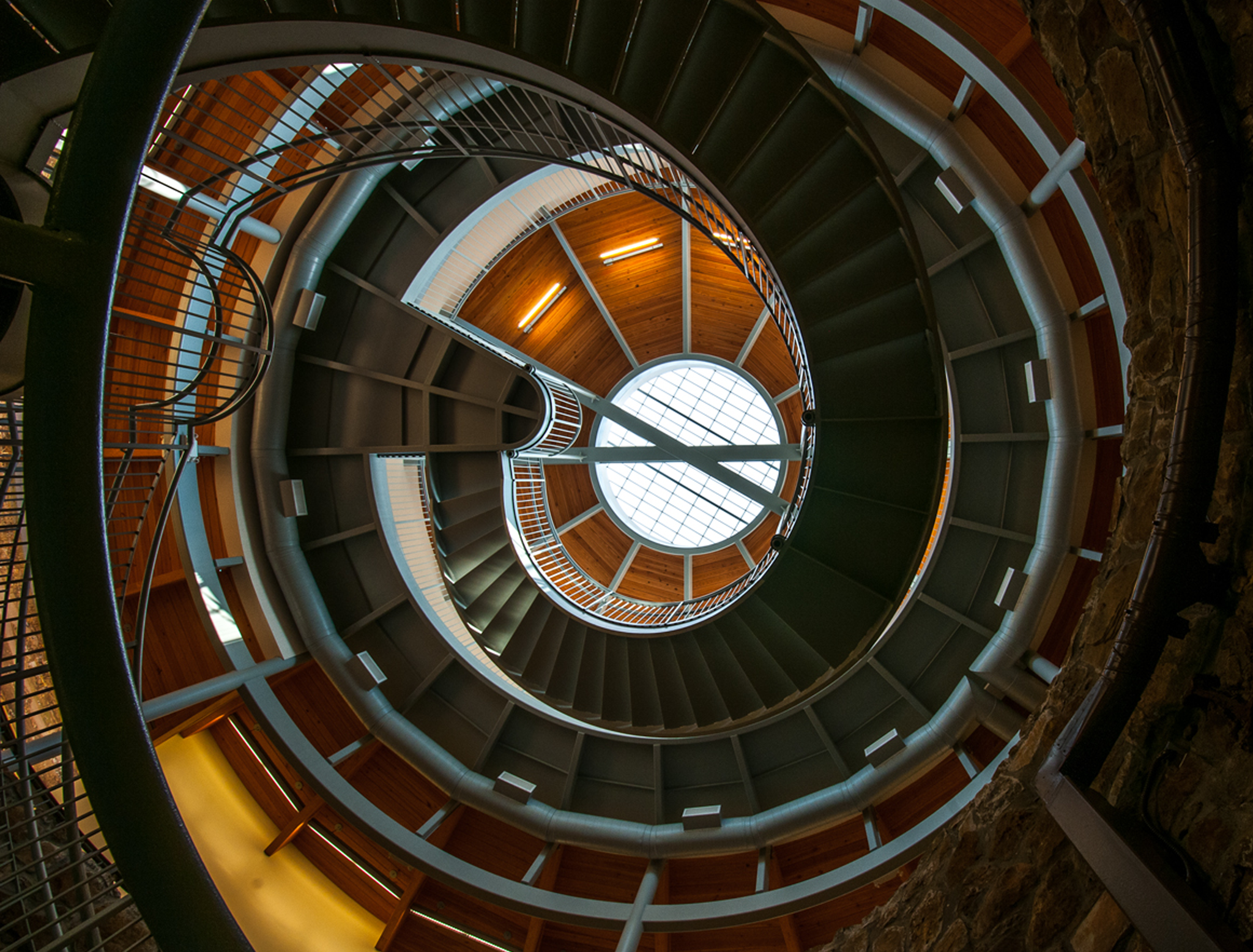
Big Well spiral staircase

Greensburg is home to the world's largest hand dug well. Work had begun on the well in 1887 to provide water for the steam engines of the Atchison, Topeka and Santa Fe Railway and Chicago, Rock Island and Pacific Railroad. When the well was completed in 1888 it was 109 feet (33 m) deep and 32 feet (9.8 m) in diameter. The well was used as the city's water supply until 1932. In 1939 it was opened as a tourist attraction allowing visitors to descend to the bottom of the well.

The adjacent museum displayed a 1000-pound pallasite meteorite until the museum fell down around the meteorite during the 2007 tornado that destroyed the city. The meteorite was found in the rubble of the museum and moved to a temporary home in Hays, Kansas while Greensburg was rebuilding.

On October 16, 2006, a related smaller meteorite measuring 154 pounds (70 kilograms) was dug up near Greensburg (5 miles (8.0 km)) and Haviland (4 miles (6.4 km)). The only scientific publication discussing time of impact suggests a terrestrial age of 20,000 years. It was once thought that its age was around 10,000 years.

== Transportation ==
Greensburg is served by three U.S. Highways:

- US-54 / US-400,
- US-183.

Bus service is provided daily eastward towards Wichita, Kansas and westward towards Pueblo, Colorado by BeeLine Express (subcontractor of Greyhound Lines).

== Notable people ==
- Manvel H. Davis, Republican who lost to Harry S. Truman in the 1940 U.S. Senate election in Missouri
- Dennis McKinney, Kansas State Treasurer (2008–2010)
- Sandra Seacat, actress and acting coach

== Gallery ==
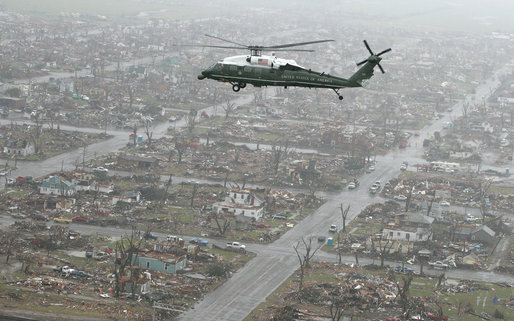
Marine One, carrying President George W. Bush, flies over the damaged city five days after the tornado.

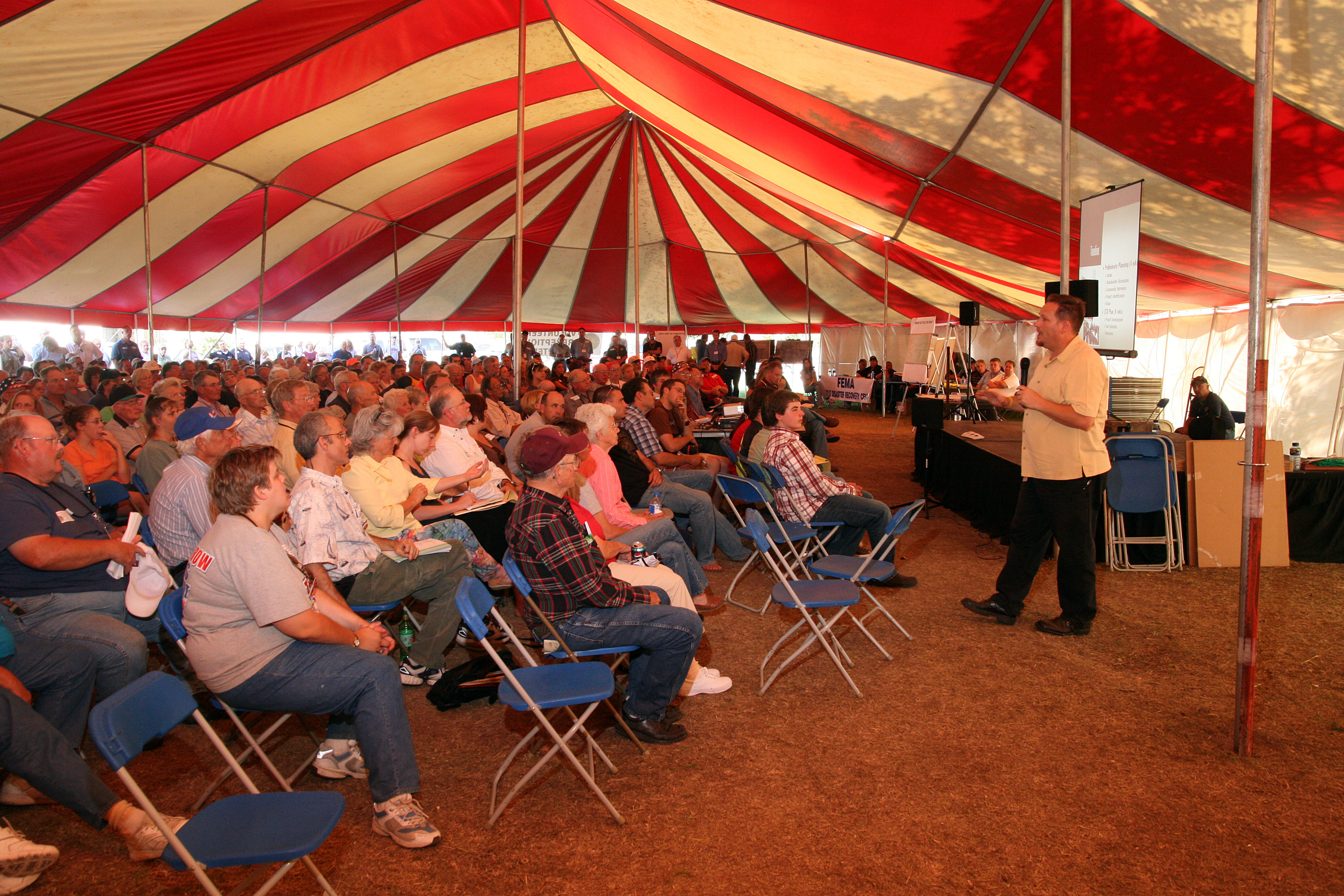
FEMA recovery meeting about 1 month after the tornado.

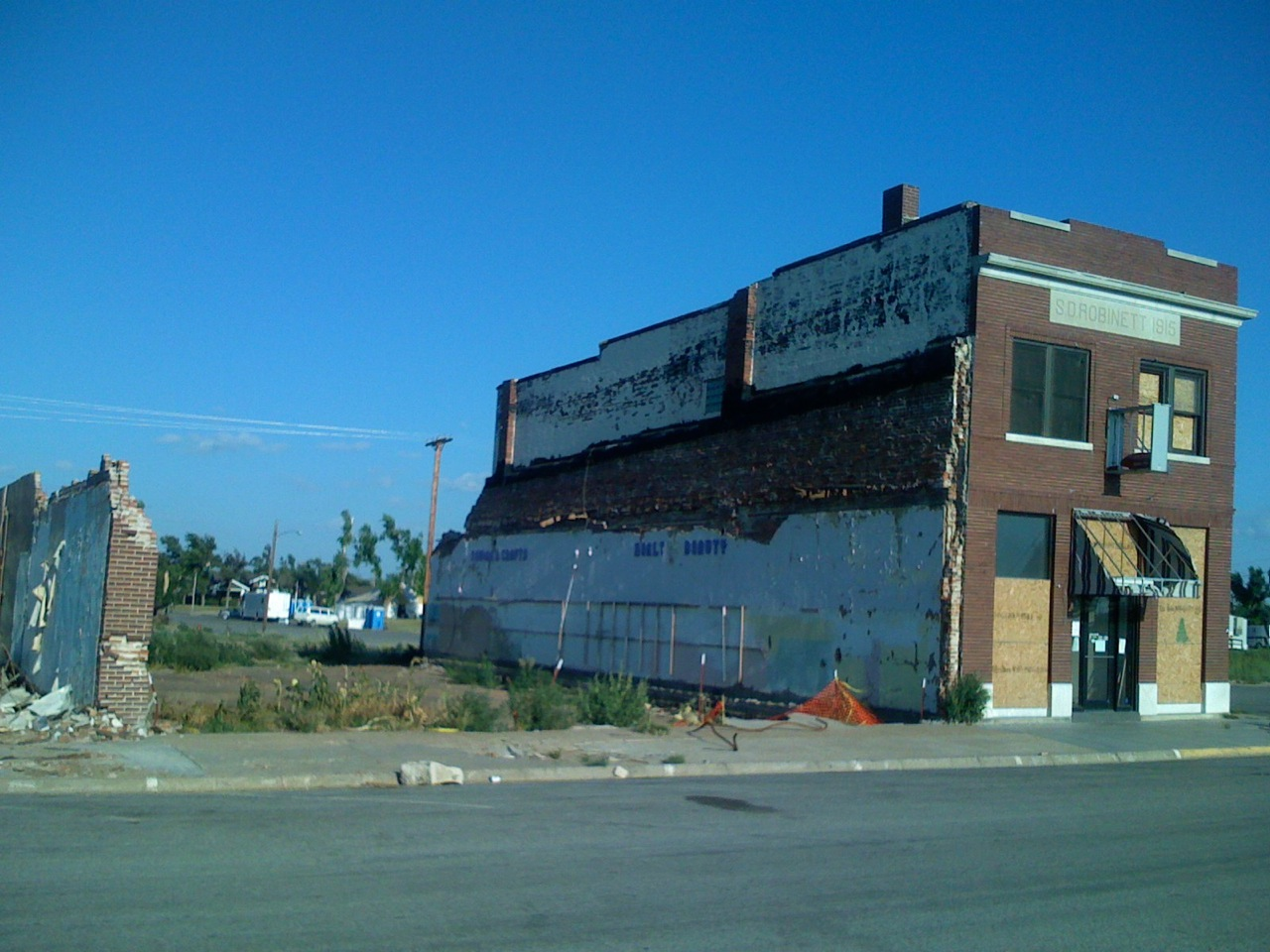
S.D. Robinett Building in 2007 about three months after the tornado, the only historic building in downtown Greensburg to survive the tornado.

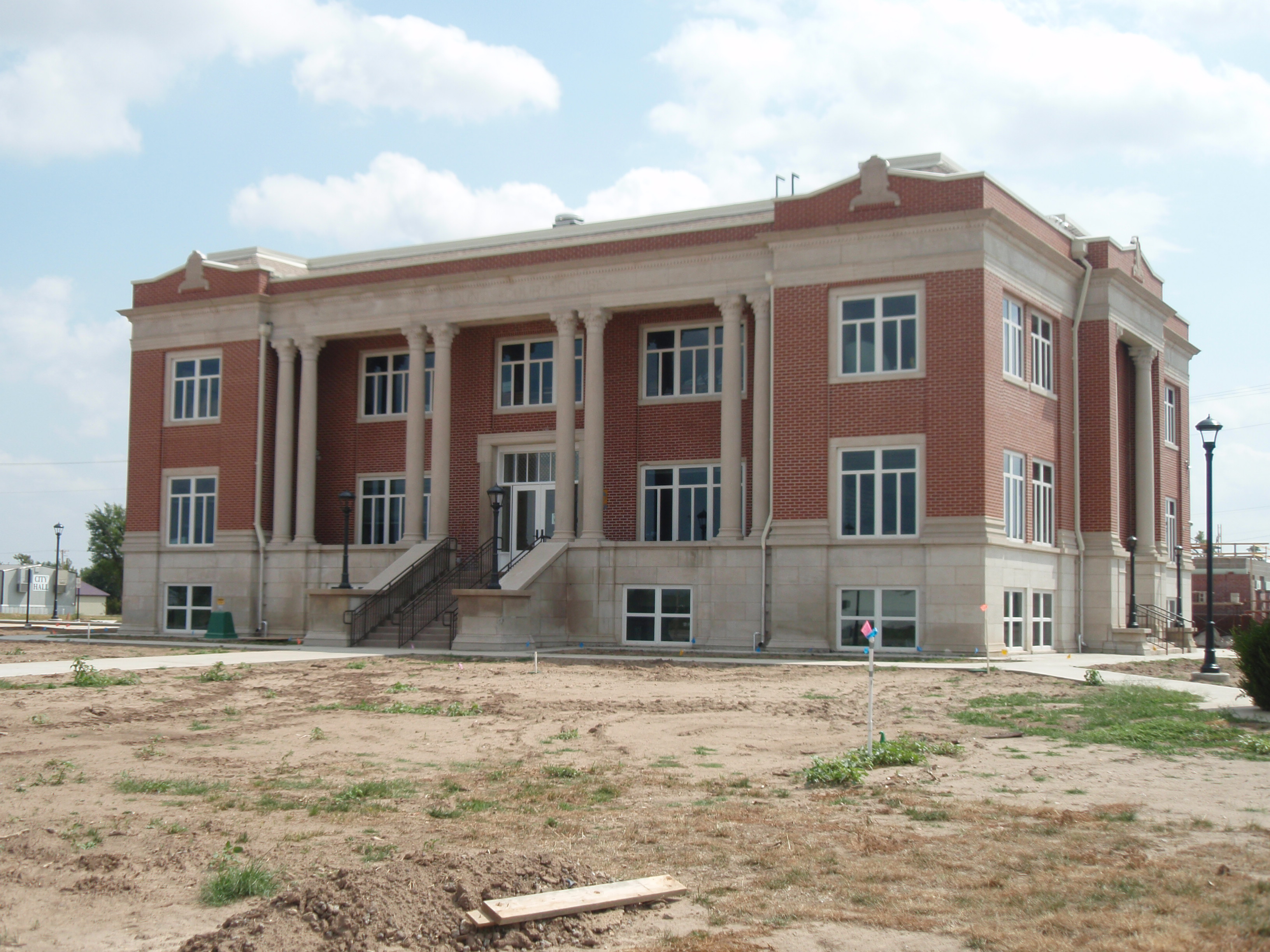
Renovated Kiowa County courthouse in 2009 (about 2.4 years after the tornado).

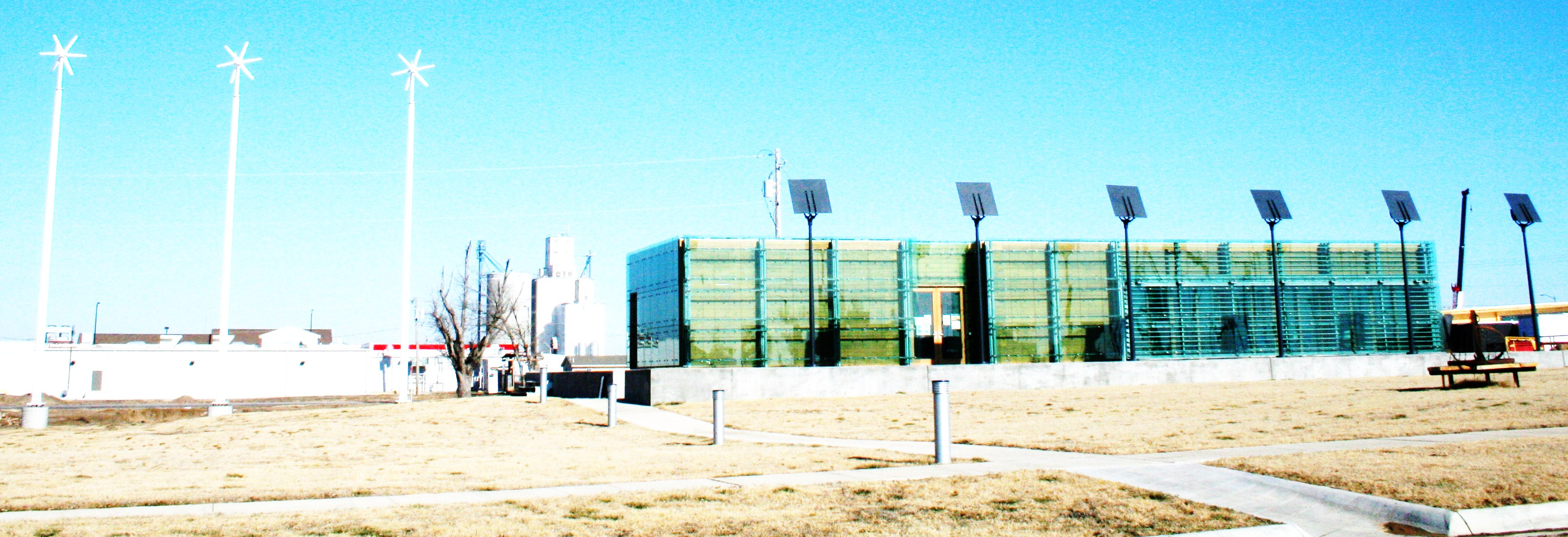
Arts Center in 2010, constructed with environmental LEED Platinum standards. It has solar panels and wind generators for energy self-sufficiency.

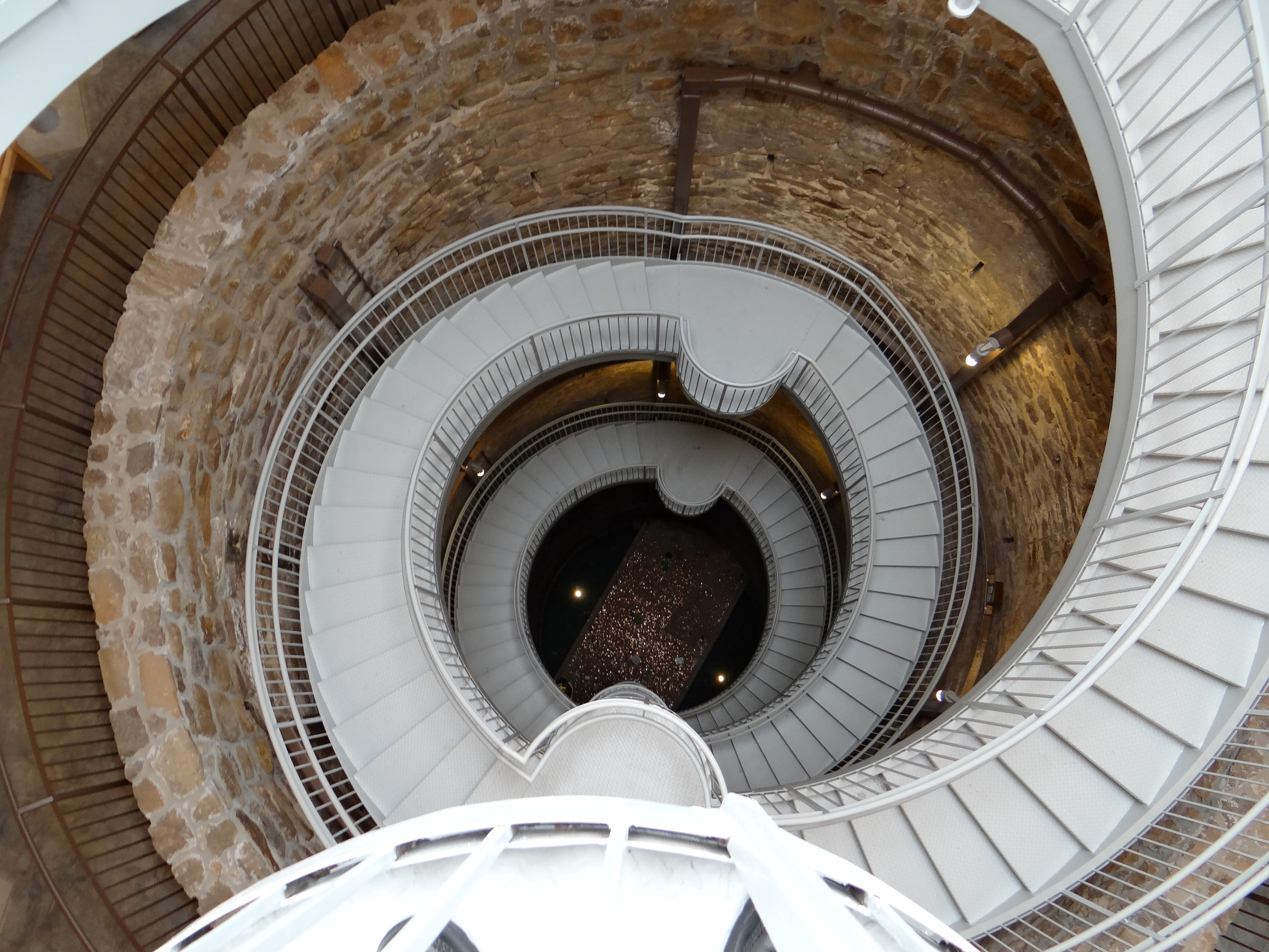
Rebuilt Big Well in 2013.

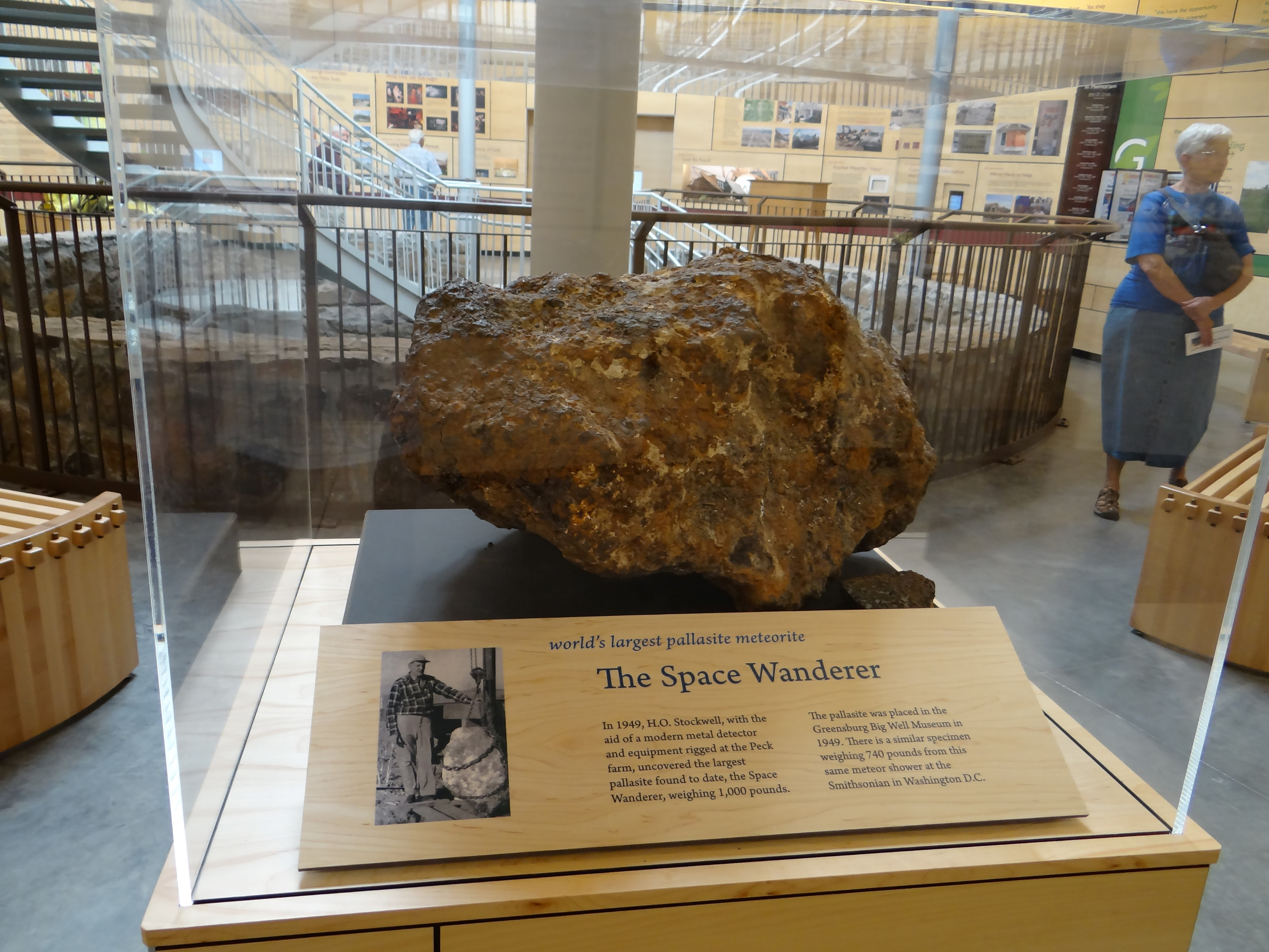
"World's Largest Pallasite Meteorite", now stored in the new Big Well Museum (2013).

== See also ==
- Brenham (meteorite)
