= List of United States tornadoes in May 2007 =

This page documents all the tornadoes that touched down in the United States in May 2007. Tornadoes in the month of January are given with their Fujita Scale intensity while all tornadoes from February and on are given with their Enhanced Fujita Scale intensity. This is because the scale was changed on February 1 due to the National Weather Service implementing a more accurate way to classify tornadoes.

== United States Yearly Total ==
Confirmed tornadoes by Enhanced Fujita rating
EFU	EF0	EF1	EF2	EF3	EF4	EF5	Total
0	675	298	91	27	4	1	1,096

- Note: January tornadoes were rated using the old Fujita scale, but are included in the chart above by matching the F rating to the related EF scale rating.

== May ==
Confirmed tornadoes by Enhanced Fujita rating
EFU	EF0	EF1	EF2	EF3	EF4	EF5	Total
0	167	60	17	5	0	1	250

=== May 1 event ===
List of confirmed tornadoes –Tuesday, May 1, 2007 (Note: All dates are based on the local time zone where the tornado touched down; however, all times are in Coordinated Universal Time for consistency.)
EF#	Location	County / Parish	State	Start Coord.	Time (UTC)	Path length	Max width	Summary
EF0	N of Alma	Wabaunsee	KS	39.0345°N 96.28°W	18:50	0.1 mi (0.16 km)	50 yd (46 m)	A brief tornado touched down near I-70.
EF0	W of Fowler	Meade	KS	37.38°N 100.2091°W	19:20–19:21	0.2 mi (0.32 km)	30 yd (27 m)	A weak tornado occurred for about a minute.
EF0	N of Portage	Wood	OH	41.3345°N 83.65°W	19:50	0.25 mi (0.40 km)	30 yd (27 m)	A tornado touched down in an open field doing no damage.
EF0	E of Lohn to NW of Rochelle	McCulloch	TX	31.32°N 99.31°W	20:05–20:20	3.26 mi (5.25 km)	30 yd (27 m)	Storm spotters watched a landspout tornado only minorly damage wheat crops.
EF0	Southern Maple Hill	Wabaunsee	KS	39.08°N 96.03°W	20:07	0.1 mi (0.16 km)	50 yd (46 m)	A tornado touched down for less than a minute in the southern part of Maple Hill. No damage occurred.
EF0	SE of Maple Hill	Wabaunsee	KS	39.0391°N 95.9773°W	20:17	0.1 mi (0.16 km)	50 yd (46 m)	A brief tornado occurred.
EF0	NW of Rochelle	McCulloch	TX	31.2822°N 99.2483°W	20:35–20:40	1.82 mi (2.93 km)	30 yd (27 m)	A landspout tornado remained over open fields.
EF1	SE of Meadville	Crawford	PA	41.5993°N 80.109°W	22:05–22:10	2 mi (3.2 km)	30 yd (27 m)	Several hundred trees were knocked down and nearly a dozen structures were damaged.
EF0	N of Mercer	Mercer	PA	41.2445°N 80.23°W	22:15–22:21	4 mi (6.4 km)	100 yd (91 m)	A weak tornado uprooted and snapped trees before destroying a barn. Trees also fell on two mobile homes, damaging them.
EF0	N of Harper	Gillespie	TX	30.3145°N 99.25°W	00:40–00:42	0.2 mi (0.32 km)	20 yd (18 m)	A small tornado was reported by a storm spotter and storm chaser. The tornado remained in an open field before dissipating.

=== May 2 event ===
List of confirmed tornadoes –Wednesday, May 2, 2007
EF#	Location	County / Parish	State	Start Coord.	Time (UTC)	Path length	Max width	Summary
EF0	WSW of Sterling City	Sterling	TX	31.7621°N 101.193°W	17:20–17:23	0.59 mi (0.95 km)	20 yd (18 m)	A trucker witnessed a tornado over open country.
EF0	NW of Orient to NW of Tennyson	Tom Green, Coke	TX	31.6827°N 100.3684°W	18:35–18:46	6.39 mi (10.28 km)	50 yd (46 m)	A tornado moved across open country and damaged some trees.
EF0	White Sands Missile Range	Doña Ana, Otero	NM	32.2°N 106.43°W	18:48–19:40	8.38 mi (13.49 km)	150 yd (140 m)	An unusually long-lasting and large landspout traversed through the southern part of the missile range at a very slow pace.
EF0	E of Maverick	Runnels	TX	31.83°N 100.19°W	19:08–19:11	0.45 mi (0.72 km)	30 yd (27 m)	A tornado briefly touched down and destroyed a barn.
EF0	White Sands Missile Range	Otero	NM	32.59°N 106.25°W	19:45–19:50	0.58 mi (0.93 km)	20 yd (18 m)	A small tornado briefly touched down in the desert
EF1	Southern Rockwood to NNW of Whon	Coleman	TX	31.5136°N 99.4185°W	20:20–20:35	5.7 mi (9.2 km)	100 yd (91 m)	A tornado moved through the south side of Rockwood damaging a few buildings, including their brand-new post office. The tornado exited town and continued another couple miles damaging barns and trees.
EF1	ENE of Brookesmith to NNW of Indian Creek	Brown	TX	31.5605°N 99.0902°W	20:48–20:58	4.77 mi (7.68 km)	110 yd (100 m)	A tornado caused tree damage.
EF0	Cleburne	Johnson	TX	32.35°N 97.4°W	22:11–22:13	0.2 mi (0.32 km)	30 yd (27 m)	A storm spotter and law enforcement reported a brief tornado in Cleburne, but no damage was reported.

=== May 3 event ===
List of confirmed tornadoes –Thursday, May 3, 2007
EF#	Location	County / Parish	State	Start Coord.	Time (UTC)	Path length	Max width	Summary
EF0	SE of Dexter to S of Essex	Stoddard	MO	36.7489°N 89.8862°W	21:28–21:36	3.54 mi (5.70 km)	30 yd (27 m)	A tornado was videotaped and photographed over open farm country. Although a debris cloud was visible in photos, no damage was found at all.
EF1	WNW of Beekman	Morehouse	LA	32.9449°N 91.9516°W	21:47–21:49	2 mi (3.2 km)	75 yd (69 m)	A home had most of its roof blown off and numerous trees were uprooted and snapped.
EF0	W of Livingston	Polk	TX	30.7°N 94.9636°W	21:50	0.3 mi (0.48 km)	25 yd (23 m)	A tornado was spotted.
EF1	NE of Bastrop	Morehouse	LA	32.8413°N 91.827°W	21:51–21:52	0.5 mi (0.80 km)	50 yd (46 m)	A tornado briefly touched down in Log Cabin and shifted a home off its foundation. A number of trees were snapped and uprooted along the short path.
EF1	SE of Fountain Hill	Ashley	AR	33.2989°N 91.8188°W	22:18–22:23	5 mi (8.0 km)	400 yd (370 m)	Numerous trees, some very large, were uprooted and snapped. A church had part of its roof blown off and a couple of outbuildings were destroyed.
EF0	New Caney	Montgomery	TX	30.15°N 95.2°W	22:30–22:35	0.86 mi (1.38 km)	45 yd (41 m)	A tornado traveled southeast through New Caney with mainly tree damage occurring. Minor damage also occurred to a home.
EF0	SW of Pierce	Weld	CO	40.6085°N 104.7783°W	23:29	0.1 mi (0.16 km)	50 yd (46 m)	A brief tornado damaged some trees.
EF0	W of Purcell	Weld	CO	40.63°N 104.59°W	23:58	0.1 mi (0.16 km)	50 yd (46 m)	A small tornado touched down over open country doing no damage.
EF0	ESE of Barnesville	Weld	CO	40.45°N 104.42°W	00:16	0.1 mi (0.16 km)	50 yd (46 m)	A tornado occurred over open country.
EF0	S of Alden	Weld	CO	40.39°N 104.56°W	00:21	0.1 mi (0.16 km)	50 yd (46 m)	No damage was reported as a tornado remained over open rangeland.
EF0	N of Lindsay	Cooke	TX	33.6717°N 97.23°W	00:40–00:41	0.5 mi (0.80 km)	30 yd (27 m)	A brief tornado touched down.
EF0	E of Buckingham	Weld	CO	40.61°N 103.9°W	01:50	0.1 mi (0.16 km)	50 yd (46 m)	A tornado occurred near Pawnee National Grasslands and did no damage.
EF0	NNE of Narrows	Morgan	CO	40.35°N 103.88°W	02:20	0.1 mi (0.16 km)	50 yd (46 m)	A brief tornado occurred in open country.

=== May 4 event ===
List of confirmed tornadoes – Friday, May 4, 2007 (Note: All dates are based on the local time zone where the tornado touched down; however, all times are in Coordinated Universal Time for consistency.)
EF#	Location	County / Parish	State	Coord.	Time (UTC)	Path length	Max width
EF1	SW of Arnett	Ellis	OK	36.0891°N 99.8206°W	23:21–23:45	4 mi (6.4 km)	50 yd (46 m)
EF1	A barn, an outhouse, and farm equipment were destroyed west of Arnett; the adjacent home had its windows blown out. Many trees and power lines were downed along the tornado's path.						
EF0	ENE of Arnett	Ellis	OK	36.1577°N 99.6873°W	23:45	0.2 mi (0.32 km)	30 yd (27 m)
EF0	A brief tornado damaged trees and power lines.						
EF1	W of Emery	Hanson	SD	43.87°N 97.4302°W	00:55–00:58	1 mi (1.6 km)	100 yd (91 m)
EF1	One home, a barn, and power lines suffered damage.						
EF0	ENE of Deer Trail	Arapahoe	CO	39.73°N 103.73°W	01:00	0.1 mi (0.16 km)	20 yd (18 m)
EF0	A trained spotter observed a tornado over open country.						
EF0	SE of Gaylord	Smith	KS	39.6347°N 98.8301°W	01:20	0.1 mi (0.16 km)	40 yd (37 m)
EF0	A brief tornado lofted a center pivot irrigation system.						
EF0	E of Farmer	Hanson	SD	43.72°N 97.66°W	01:21–01:22	0.2 mi (0.32 km)	50 yd (46 m)
EF0	Brief tornado with no damage.						
EF0	N of Sitka	Clark	KS	37.2097°N 99.6728°W	01:32–01:45	6.04 mi (9.72 km)	75 yd (69 m)
EF0	See section on this tornado family – This was one of two simultaneous tornadoes over open country in Clark County; no damage occurred. These were the first tornado produced by the prolific supercell that ultimately spawned the EF5 Greensburg tornado.						
EF0	E of Sitka	Clark	KS	37.18°N 99.5795°W	01:34–01:39	4.2 mi (6.8 km)	50 yd (46 m)
EF0	See section on this tornado family – This was the second of two simultaneous tornadoes over open country in Clark County; no damage occurred.						
EF0	NNW of Protection	Comanche	KS	37.251°N 99.5065°W	01:48–01:52	2.9 mi (4.7 km)	50 yd (46 m)
EF0	See section on this tornado family – This tornado succeeded the two Clark County events and also remained over open fields.						
EF1	NNE of Sitka	Clark	KS	37.3176°N 99.5984°W	01:50–01:56	2.3 mi (3.7 km)	75 yd (69 m)
EF1	See section on this tornado family – One barn was damaged by a tornado that otherwise remained over open fields.						
EF5	NNW of Coldwater to Greensburg	Comanche, Kiowa	KS	37.3649°N 99.4493°W	02:00–03:05	28.8 mi (46.3 km)	3,000 yd (2,700 m)
EF5	12 deaths – See article on this tornado – This massive, extremely powerful and catastrophic tornado passed through the heart of Greensburg with estimated winds of 205 mph (330 km/h), "[wiping the town] off the face of the earth". Eleven people were killed, including a few in their basements after being buried under debris. (Note: Emergency management agencies consider basements to be one of the safest places to shelter during a tornado.) A total of 1,484 structures were impacted by the tornado, of which 961 were destroyed, with monetary losses reaching $250 million. The tornado left behind an estimated 800,000 yd^{3} (600,000 m^{3}) of debris. Law enforcement officers and military personnel from across the country assisted in relief efforts, while the Federal Emergency Management Agency provided tens of millions of dollars in aid. In the ten years following the tornado, the town was rebuilt as a green community, ultimately having the most Leadership in Energy and Environmental Design certifications per capita in the nation and all of its power supplied by wind energy. Federal agencies provided $120 million for the reconstruction process. There were 63 injuries from this tornado.						
EF1	NNW of Coldwater	Comanche, Kiowa	KS	37.3802°N 99.4136°W	02:08–02:12	1.25 mi (2.01 km)	50 yd (46 m)
EF1	See section on this tornado family – This was a satellite tornado of the EF5 Greensburg tornado event. Some damage to trees occurred.						
EF0	SSE of Mullinville	Kiowa	KS	37.4013°N 99.3736°W	02:18–02:19	0.1 mi (0.16 km)	25 yd (23 m)
EF0	See section on this tornado family – This was a satellite tornado of the EF5 Greensburg tornado event; no damage occurred.						
EF0	S of Joy	Kiowa	KS	37.4216°N 99.3708°W	02:18–02:20	0.5 mi (0.80 km)	30 yd (27 m)
EF0	See section on this tornado family – This was a satellite tornado of the EF5 Greensburg tornado event; no damage occurred.						
EF0	S of Greensburg (1st tornado)	Kiowa	KS	37.4455°N 99.3213°W	02:24–02:27	1.5 mi (2.4 km)	75 yd (69 m)
EF0	See section on this tornado family – This was a satellite tornado of the EF5 Greensburg tornado event; no damage occurred.						
EF0	S of Greensburg (2nd tornado)	Kiowa	KS	37.402°N 99.3296°W	02:25–02:26	0.73 mi (1.17 km)	30 yd (27 m)
EF0	See section on this tornado family – This was an anticyclonic satellite tornado of the EF5 Greensburg tornado event; no damage occurred.						
EF1	SSE of Greensburg (1st tornado)	Kiowa	KS	37.5637°N 99.2484°W	02:55–02:59	4.6 mi (7.4 km)	100 yd (91 m)
EF1	See section on this tornado family – This was one of a pair of satellite tornadoes to the EF5 Greensburg tornado that occurred along US 54. It some damage to trees and power lines.						
EF0	SSE of Greensburg (2nd tornado)	Kiowa	KS	37.5646°N 99.2494°W	02:55–02:56	0.46 mi (0.74 km)	30 yd (27 m)
EF0	See section on this tornado family – This was one of a pair of satellite tornadoes to the EF5 Greensburg tornado that occurred along US 54. This one not impact anything before being absorbed into the preceding tornado.						
EF3	N of Greensburg to Trousdale to SSW of Belpre	Kiowa, Edwards	KS	37.6328°N 99.2627°W	03:03–04:08	23.5 mi (37.8 km)	3,872 yd (3,541 m)
EF3	See section on this tornado family – This immense tornado formed as the EF5 Greensburg event circled north of the town and dissipated. Multiple farms sustained extensive damage. A combine harvester was hurled more than 0.25 miles (0.40 km) before "[disintegrating] upon impact". Many irrigation pivot systems and trees were impacted. Dozens of livestock were killed and one person was injured; damage is estimated at $1.5 million. At its peak width, the broader circulation of the tornado aloft reached 4.3 mi (7 km) in diameter.						
EF3	NNW of Wellsford to Hopewell to SSW of Macksville	Kiowa, Edwards, Pratt, Stafford	KS	37.6895°N 99.0663°W	03:39–04:37	18.22 mi (29.32 km)	2,110 yd (1,930 m)
EF3	1 death – See section on this tornado family – Trees and irrigation pivots were damaged in Kiowa and Edwards Counties. Within Pratt County, the tornado grew dramatically and intensified, completely levelling one home. A man was killed in his home when the walls collapsed on him in the basement. In Stafford County, farms sustained extensive damage and a grain cart was thrown 0.75 miles (1.21 km), being destroyed in the process. One home was swept from its foundation. Several heads of cattle and local wildlife were killed along the tornado's path. Two people were injured.						
EF1	WSW of Phillipsburg	Phillips	KS	39.7445°N 99.3374°W	04:20–04:30	0.5 mi (0.80 km)	75 yd (69 m)
EF1	A small tornado occurred within a broader area of damaging straight-line winds. A few homes sustained roof and window damage and trees were uprooted.						
EF3	S of Macksville to NNE of Quivira National Wildlife Refuge	Stafford	KS	37.8986°N 98.9545°W	04:34–04:58	17.4 mi (28.0 km)	1,515 yd (1,385 m)
EF3	1 death – See section on this tornado family – As the 03:39 UTC EF3 tornado dissipated near Macksville, another tornado developed south of the city. A police officer observing the former tornado was caught unaware in his car; the vehicle was thrown 0.25 miles (0.40 km), leaving him with fatal injuries. More than a dozen farms sustained extensive damage, especially to machinery and irrigation pivots, while many trees were snapped or uprooted.						

=== May 5 event ===
List of confirmed tornadoes – Saturday, May 5, 2007
EF#	Location	County / Parish	State	Start Coord.	Time (UTC)	Path length	Max width
EF1	NNW of Hudson	Stafford	KS	38.16°N 98.6853°W	05:28–05:39	5.7 mi (9.2 km)	150 yd (140 m)
EF1	See section on this tornado family – Trees and irrigation pivots were damaged along a path west of the Quivira National Wildlife Refuge.						
EF0	SW of Ellinwood	Barton	KS	38.2784°N 98.6712°W	05:48–05:49	0.5 mi (0.80 km)	40 yd (37 m)
EF0	See section on this tornado family – A brief tornado occurred over open fields.						
EF0	SE of Great Bend	Barton	KS	38.2765°N 98.7206°W	05:55–05:57	0.1 mi (0.16 km)	50 yd (46 m)
EF0	See section on this tornado family – A brief tornado damaged trees and power poles.						
EF1	SSW of Claflin	Barton	KS	38.4399°N 98.5724°W	06:21–06:41	5.54 mi (8.92 km)	100 yd (91 m)
EF1	See section on this tornado family – Five large grain bins were destroyed, two of which were thrown into a nearby grocery store. Several outbuildings and two barns were destroyed; a church had damage to its steeple.						
EF1	S of Claflin	Barton	KS	38.4333°N 98.53°W	06:28–06:50	6.18 mi (9.95 km)	125 yd (114 m)
EF1	See section on this tornado family – Several trees, power lines, and one structure were damaged.						
EF1	SSE of Claflin	Barton, Rice	KS	38.4666°N 98.5017°W	06:46–06:53	5.19 mi (8.35 km)	100 yd (91 m)
EF1	See section on this tornado family – Several sheds and power lines were damaged.						
EF0	NE of Holyrood	Ellsworth	KS	38.6004°N 98.3738°W	06:46–06:53	0.5 mi (0.80 km)	40 yd (37 m)
EF0	See section on this tornado family – Several large trees and a power pole were knocked down. This was the final of 22 tornadoes produced by the Greensburg supercell.						
EF1	SW of Callaway to E of Arnold	Custer	NE	41.1213°N 100.1675°W	17:23–17:55	20.6 mi (33.2 km)	150 yd (140 m)
EF1	A long-lived tornado caused minor to moderate damage to numerous farmsteads along its path. Farm equipment, including irrigation pivots, were damaged or overturned, trees were snapped and uprooted as were power poles.						
EF0	NE of Sterling	Logan	CO	40.65°N 103.16°W	17:57	0.1 mi (0.16 km)	50 yd (46 m)
EF0	A brief tornado touched down over open fields.						
EF1	NE of Arnold to S of Ainsworth	Custer, Blaine, Brown	NE	41.5106°N 100.0925°W	18:03–19:27	54.97 mi (88.47 km)	220 yd (200 m)
EF1	A very long-lived tornado tracked through three counties in central Nebraska. Farm equipment, including irrigation pivots, were damaged or overturned, trees were snapped and uprooted as were power poles. Windmills were also destroyed. One vehicle was lofted along N-2.						
EF0	Santee Sioux Reservation	Knox	NE	42.6609°N 97.8144°W	20:48–21:05	11.36 mi (18.28 km)	100 yd (91 m)
EF0	This tornado tracked through largely unpopulated areas of the Santee Sioux Reservation. Northeast of Center, a shed was destroyed and a nearby trailer was overturned; six cattle died.						
EF1	SSE of Springview to NNE of Burton	Keya Paha	NE	42.7242°N 99.676°W	20:57–21:19	16.7 mi (26.9 km)	100 yd (91 m)
EF1	The same thunderstorm that produced the long-tracked EF1 tornado spawned another tornado in Keya Paha County. A barn and two outbuildings were destroyed, 40 power poles were snapped, and farm equipment was overturned. One person was injured while riding a tractor.						
EF1	WSW of Carthage	Miner	SD	44.1534°N 97.7759°W	21:31–21:32	0.1 mi (0.16 km)	50 yd (46 m)
EF1	Several outbuildings were damaged.						
EF2	SSE of Tyndall	Bon Homme	SD	42.9533°N 97.8349°W	21:33–21:38	3.5 mi (5.6 km)	100 yd (91 m)
EF2	Several outbuildings and sheds were damaged; a hog shed was flipped into a nearby home. A two-car garage was moved off its foundation. Several trees and a windmill were also damaged.						
EF2	NW of Howard	Miner	SD	44.0711°N 97.6011°W	21:35–21:36	1 mi (1.6 km)	100 yd (91 m)
EF2	A brief but strong tornado destroyed a hunting lodge and damaged outbuildings.						
EF2	NNW of Tyndall	Bon Homme	SD	43.0735°N 97.903°W	21:43–21:50	4 miles (6.4 km)	100 yd (91 m)
EF2	Two farmsteads saw significant damage; a home was shifted off its foundation at one of them. Several outbuildings were destroyed, grain bins had their roofs blown off, and widespread tree damage occurred with some debarking noted.						
EF0	S of Byers	Pratt	KS	37.73°N 98.858°W	21:48–21:51	1.45 mi (2.33 km)	30 yd (27 m)
EF0	Storm chasers observed a brief tornado.						
EF1	S of Western to SE of Dorchester	Saline	NE	40.3711°N 97.2°W	21:58–22:28	18.3 mi (29.5 km)	400 yd (370 m)
EF1	A long-lived tornado caused damage to multiple farmsteads, including destroyed outbuildings, twisted trees, and overturned farm equipment. In a rural area well-west of Wilber, debris was thrown up to 0.25 miles (0.40 km). Eight headstones and a monument were destroyed by fallen trees at Tabor Hall.						
EF1	N of Iuka to SW of Stafford	Pratt, Stafford	KS	37.801°N 98.735°W	21:59–21:01	11.12 mi (17.90 km)	150 yd (140 m)
EF1	Irrigation pivots and trees were damaged.						
EF0	N of Tripp	Hutchinson	SD	43.2345°N 97.97°W	22:00–22:01	0.2 mi (0.32 km)	50 yd (46 m)
EF0	A brief tornado damaged trees and an irrigation pivot.						
EF0	Dimock	Hutchinson	SD	43.47°N 97.98°W	22:10–22:11	0.1 miles (0.16 km)	50 yd (46 m)
EF0	Local law enforcement observed a brief tornado.						
EF0	W of Bloomfield	Knox	NE	42.6°N 97.6987°W	22:15–22:20	1.54 mi (2.48 km)	200 yd (180 m)
EF0	Large power line supports and trees were damaged.						
EF0	E of Parkston	Hutchinson	SD	43.4°N 97.8606°W	22:16–22:24	5 mi (8.0 km)	100 yd (91 m)
EF0	An unknown amount of tree damage occurred.						
EF0	WNW of Wausa	Knox	NE	42.5111°N 97.5662°W	22:17–22:22	2.95 mi (4.75 km)	100 yd (91 m)
EF0	A brief tornado caused minor tree damage.						
EF1	SE of Riverside	Hanson, Davison	SD	43.7118°N 97.9387°W	22:20–22:25	1.9 mi (3.1 km)	100 yd (91 m)
EF1	One home had its roof blown off and trees were damaged.						
EF0	SW of Bloomfield	Knox	NE	42.5847°N 97.6092°W	22:24–22:30	5.26 mi (8.47 km)	150 yd (140 m)
EF0	Trees and outbuildings were damage and livestock were killed. An irrigation pivot was also overturned.						
EF1	NE of Bloomfield	Knox	NE	42.6383°N 97.5779°W	22:28–22:45	8.93 mi (14.37 km)	440 yd (400 m)
EF1	Several farmsteads, trees, power poles, and outbuildings were damaged. This was the first of three simultaneous tornadoes in Knox County.						
EF0	E of Bedford Station	Stafford	KS	38.028°N 98.599°W	22:36–22:43	4.5 mi (7.2 km)	100 yd (91 m)
EF0	Storm chasers observed a tornado over open fields.						
EF1	NW of Alexandria	Hanson	SD	43.7113°N 97.8648°W	22:41–22:42	0.5 mi (0.80 km)	100 yd (91 m)
EF1	A brief tornado damaged barns.						
EF2	NW of Crofton	Knox	NE	42.7556°N 97.5148°W	22:43–22:51	5.5 mi (8.9 km)	500 yd (460 m)
EF2	Extensive damage occurred around Lewis and Clark Lake where the recreation center and marina were heavily impacted. Fewer camp vans were present than normal, with only 30 at the time of the tornado. Many campers and boats were flipped or destroyed. Three people were injured when their SUV was lofted 100 feet (30 m). Damage at the recreation area was estimated at $1 million. Observers in the area reported either multiple tornadoes or multiple vortices as it moved through Lewis and Clark Lake. Elsewhere, several homes had minor damage and trees and power poles were snapped. This was the second of three simultaneous tornadoes in Knox County.						
EF0	NNW of Crofton	Knox	NE	42.7834°N 97.5101°W	22:45–22:50	3.5 mi (5.6 km)	100 yd (91 m)
EF0	This was the final of three simultaneous tornadoes in Knox County. The tornado flipped a camper and damaged trees before dissipating over Lewis and Clark Lake.						
EF0	SSE of Mitchell	Davison	SD	43.6265°N 97.9665°W	22:50–22:55	3.5 mi (5.6 km)	50 yd (46 m)
EF0	A trained spotter observed a tornado over open fields.						
EF1	W of Yankton	Yankton	SD	42.87°N 97.4786°W	22:52–22:55	1 mi (1.6 km)	100 yd (91 m)
EF1	Two homes were damaged, one of which had its roof torn off, and a garage was destroyed. One person was injured on the north side of Lewis and Clark Lake when their camper was thrown. This one of another set of simultaneous tornadoes around the aforementioned lake.						
EF0	W of Yankton	Yankton	SD	42.87°N 97.4984°W	22:52–22:53	0.1 mi (0.16 km)	50 yd (46 m)
EF0	This brief tornado occurred simultaneously with another tornado near Lewis and Clark Lake; no damage occurred with this event.						
EF2	Osborne	Osborne	KS	39.3866°N 98.7°W	22:59–23:25	7.5 miles (12.1 km)	75 yd (69 m)
EF2	This moved directly through Osborne, damaging many structures and destroying two mobile homes. A local Circle Inn had partial wall collapses and significant damage to an interior restaurant. A few semi-trailers were knocked over, one onto a car. Eleven people were injured in the town, none seriously.						
EF0	W of Belpre	Edwards	KS	37.945°N 99.174°W	23:00–23:10	2.44 mi (3.93 km)	75 yd (69 m)
EF0	A trained spotter observed a tornado over open fields.						
EF3	SE of Plankinton	Aurora	SD	43.6791°N 98.4234°W	23:05–23:13	4 mi (6.4 km)	200 yd (180 m)
EF3	This strong tornado traveled along a south to north path east of Plankinton, crossing Interstate 90 along the way. The worst damage occurred at a pheasant hunting lodge/preserve where many trees and buildings were severely damaged. A car trailer was rolled 100 yards (91 m), and many pheasant chicks were killed.						
EF0	SSW of Raymond	Rice	KS	38.2399°N 98.4411°W	23:09–23:10	0.3 mi (0.48 km)	40 yd (37 m)
EF0	A brief tornado touched down over open fields.						
EF1	N of Artesian	Sanborn	SD	44.0345°N 97.92°W	23:15–23:17	0.5 mi (0.80 km)	100 yd (91 m)
EF1	Three outbuildings were destroyed and one home had siding damage. Several trees were uprooted and power poles were snapped.						
EF0	NW of Alden	Rice	KS	38.3113°N 98.3981°W	23:15–23:20	1.5 mi (2.4 km)	40 yd (37 m)
EF0	A brief tornado touched down over open fields.						
EF2	N of Lesterville	Yankton	SD	43.1023°N 97.6°W	23:17–23:19	0.5 mi (0.80 km)	100 yd (91 m)
EF2	Numerous outbuildings and three concrete silos were destroyed; a barn and shed also suffered damage. A garage was thrown 1 mi (1.6 km) by the tornado.						
EF0	S of Gregory	Gregory	SD	43.1577°N 99.43°W	23:30–23:31	0.1 mi (0.16 km)	50 yd (46 m)
EF0	This was the first of two simultaneous tornadoes in Gregory County; no damage occurred.						
EF0	SW of Gregory	Gregory	SD	43.1584°N 99.5282°W	23:30	0.1 mi (0.16 km)	50 yd (46 m)
EF0	This was the second of two simultaneous tornadoes in Gregory County; no damage occurred.						
EF0	NE of Protection	Comanche	KS	37.2379°N 99.4275°W	23:33–23:36	1.89 mi (3.04 km)	30 yd (27 m)
EF0	A brief tornado caused no damage.						
EF0	W of Platte	Charles Mix	SD	43.38°N 99.0489°W	23:35–23:36	0.1 miles (0.16 km)	50 yd (46 m)
EF0	A brief tornado caused no damage.						
EF1	N of Kimball	Brule	SD	43.8946°N 98.95°W	23:40–23:42	0.5 mi (0.80 km)	100 yd (91 m)
EF1	A calf shelter was destroyed, one home had shingle damage, and trees were downed.						
EF0	SW of Great Bend	Barton	KS	38.3087°N 98.8482°W	23:45–23:46	0.05 mi (0.080 km)	50 yd (46 m)
EF0	A brief tornado caused no damage.						
EF0	SW of Great Bend	Barton	KS	38.3393°N 98.8091°W	23:54–23:55	0.2 mi (0.32 km)	40 yd (37 m)
EF0	A brief tornado caused no damage.						
EF2	SW of Trousdale	Edwards	KS	37.7964°N 99.1099°W	00:01–00:06	2.7 mi (4.3 km)	75 yd (69 m)
EF2	Irrigation pivots and trees were damaged.						
EF0	SE of Greensburg	Kiowa	KS	37.4986°N 99.217°W	00:02–00:16	7.8 mi (12.6 km)	75 yd (69 m)
EF0	This tornado remained over open fields and caused no damage.						
EF0	S of Glenwood	Mills	IA	40.9777°N 95.77°W	00:09–00:16	4 mi (6.4 km)	80 yd (73 m)
EF0	Trained spotters observed a tornado over open fields.						
EF0	NE of Lutie	Collingsworth	TX	35.1207°N 100.107°W	00:20–00:23	2.78 mi (4.47 km)	100 yd (91 m)
EF0	Local law enforcement observed a tornado over open fields.						
EF2	N of Haviland to E of Zook	Kiowa, Edwards, Pratt, Stafford, Pawnee	KS	37.6771°N 99.1°W	00:22–01:07	26.86 mi (43.23 km)	880 yd (800 m)
EF2	This long-lived tornado tracked very close to areas hit by an EF3 tornado the day prior. Damage was confined to farms, trees, and irrigation pivots.						
EF2	Spencer to Epiphany	McCook, Hanson	SD	43.73°N 97.6°W	00:23–00:37	10.5 mi (16.9 km)	400 yd (370 m)
EF2	Trees and one home were damaged in western Spencer while a junkyard was struck in Hanson County.						
EF0	N of Wellsford	Kiowa	KS	37.7219°N 99.03°W	00:26–00:29	1.3 mi (2.1 km)	50 yd (46 m)
EF0	This was a brief satellite tornado to the 00:22 UTC event; no damage occurred.						
EF1	NE of Lutie	Collingsworth, Wheeler	TX	35.1663°N 100.0512°W	00:27–00:36	6.99 mi (11.25 km)	200 yd (180 m)
EF1	Storm chasers observed a tornado that largely remained over open fields. Some trees were damaged in Wheeler County.						
EF1	W of Odin	Barton	KS	38.57°N 98.6092°W	00:32–00:40	4.03 mi (6.49 km)	100 yd (91 m)
EF1	Several barns suffered minor damage, and trees and power lines were downed.						
EF0	ENE of Reydon	Roger Mills	OK	35.6887°N 99.8049°W	00:40–00:42	0.8 mi (1.3 km)	100 yd (91 m)
EF0	Storm chasers observed a brief tornado over open fields.						
EF1	S of Carthage	Miner	SD	44.0399°N 97.72°W	00:47–00:48	0.8 mi (1.3 km)	100 yd (91 m)
EF1	Two farm buildings were destroyed.						
EF0	W of Vilas	Miner	SD	44.02°N 97.6603°W	00:47–00:48	0.1 mi (0.16 km)	50 yd (46 m)
EF0	Local law enforcement observed a brief tornado over open fields.						
EF0	SE of Centerview	Edwards	KS	37.81°N 99.257°W	00:50–00:52	1.5 mi (2.4 km)	50 yd (46 m)
EF0	Trees and irrigation pivots were damaged.						
EF1	NE of Farragut to SE of Strahan	Fremont, Mills	IA	40.7404°N 95.443°W	00:50–01:11	11.76 mi (18.93 km)	200 yd (180 m)
EF1	Many trees were damaged or destroyed, and farm buildings suffered some damage.						
EF0	S of Wilson	Ellsworth	KS	38.7622°N 98.47°W	00:55–00:56	0.3 mi (0.48 km)	40 yd (37 m)
EF0	A brief tornado occurred over open fields.						
EF0	NNW of Dillwyn	Stafford	KS	37.993°N 98.841°W	00:55–00:57	1.26 mi (2.03 km)	50 yd (46 m)
EF0	A brief tornado occurred over open fields.						
EF0	E of Carthage	Miner	SD	44.17°N 97.6192°W	00:56–00:57	0.1 mi (0.16 km)	50 yd (46 m)
EF0	A pole barn was damaged.						
EF1	N of Carthage	Miner	SD	44.2567°N 97.72°W	01:03–01:04	0.1 mi (0.16 km)	50 yd (46 m)
EF1	Several outbuildings were destroyed.						
EF0	NE of Crawford	Roger Mills	OK	35.8402°N 99.7874°W	01:03	0.3 mi (0.48 km)	50 yd (46 m)
EF0	Storm chasers observed a brief tornado over open fields.						
EF2	WNW of Dillwyn	Stafford	KS	37.988°N 98.885°W	01:04–01:18	9.1 mi (14.6 km)	880 yd (800 m)
EF2	A large wedge tornado damaged homes, trees, and irrigation pivots.						
EF3	E of Sweetwater	Beckham, Roger Mills	OK	35.3935°N 99.87°W	01:04–01:26	7.7 mi (12.4 km)	150 yd (140 m)
EF3	This strong tornado paralleled SH-30, initially causing some damage to a gas station. It tracked north and struck a school east of Sweetwater, one of the smallest towns in the entire state. There, a metal multi-purpose building was completely destroyed when its anchoring failed. A storage building suffered similar damage. Several other structures on campus sustained lesser damage, though the gymnasium had its roof torn off leading to a wall collapse. A pickup truck and horse trailer were thrown 100 yards (91 m) and 0.25 miles (0.40 km), respectively, and many cars and busses were destroyed. Altogether, approximately 75 percent of the school was destroyed. A church in the town suffered damage to its steeple and walls. North of the school, a home and oil storage facility were damaged with an oil tank was thrown 500 yards (460 m). One person was injured here. Damage in Beckham County was estimated at $5 million. In Roger Mills County, the tornado snapped or uprooted numerous trees and power poles, and damaged several structures.						
EF0	ESE of Dorrance	Russell	KS	38.8223°N 98.4943°W	01:06–01:08	1 mi (1.6 km)	50 yd (46 m)
EF0	A brief tornado caused no damage.						
EF1	NW of St. John	Stafford	KS	38.034°N 98.855°W	01:11–01:20	4.95 mi (7.97 km)	300 yd (270 m)
EF1	Trees and irrigation pivots were damaged.						
EF0	N of Crawford	Roger Mills, Ellis	OK	35.8878°N 99.8°W	01:16–01:33	5 mi (8.0 km)	200 yd (180 m)
EF0	Storm chasers observed a tornado over predominantly open fields; some trees were damaged near US-283.						
EF1	NW of St. John to SSE of Great Bend	Stafford, Barton	OK	38.04°N 98.789°W	01:30–02:07	16.9 mi (27.2 km)	200 yd (180 m)
EF1	Homes, trees, and irrigation pivots were damaged.						
EF1	SW of Dempsey	Roger Mills	OK	35.5047°N 99.8388°W	01:32–01:51	8.5 mi (13.7 km)	200 yd (180 m)
EF1	Three outbuildings were destroyed and a church was damaged. Trees and power lines were damaged throughout the entire path.						
EF0	NW of Wolsey	Beadle	SD	44.4307°N 98.5129°W	01:36–01:37	0.1 mi (0.16 km)	50 yd (46 m)
EF0	Local emergency management observed a brief tornado.						
EF1	SW of Greensburg	Kiowa	KS	37.5846°N 99.3264°W	01:37–01:40	1.65 mi (2.66 km)	50 yd (46 m)
EF1	Members of the Dodge City National Weather Service Forecast Office observed this tornado while surveying damage from the EF5 Greensburg tornado the day prior. One barn was damaged by this tornado.						
EF0	SSE of Arnett	Ellis	OK	35.9964°N 99.7016°W	01:39	0.3 mi (0.48 km)	30 yd (27 m)
EF0	Local emergency management observed a brief tornado over open fields.						
EF2	WSW of Red Oak to NE of Macedonia	Montgomery, Pottawattamie	IA	41.0477°N 95.3185°W	01:40–01:52	11.58 mi (18.64 km)	400 yd (370 m)
EF2	A barn was destroyed, one home sustained roof damage, cars were thrown, and many trees were downed.						
EF0	SE of Arnett	Ellis	OK	36.1147°N 99.751°W	01:56–02:07	2 mi (3.2 km)	50 yd (46 m)
EF0	Local emergency management observed a tornado over open fields.						
EF1	SE of Oakland	Pottawattamie	IA	41.3098°N 95.3864°W	02:00–02:06	3.64 mi (5.86 km)	200 yd (180 m)
EF1	Several barns and sheds were destroyed; trees and power poles were also snapped.						
EF1	SW of Roll	Roger Mills	OK	35.7187°N 99.7956°W	02:05–02:28	7.5 mi (12.1 km)	500 yd (460 m)
EF1	A barn, shed, and well house were destroyed; a mobile home sustained minor damage. Many trees, power poles, and fences were downed.						
EF1	SE of Great Bend	Barton	KS	38.3189°N 98.7048°W	02:08–02:17	3.57 mi (5.75 km)	75 yd (69 m)
EF1	A gasoline pipeline terminal, trailer company, and irrigation pivots were damaged with total losses estimated at $1 million.						
EF2	NNE of Roll	Roger Mills, Ellis	OK	35.8401°N 99.6893°W	02:34–02:50	8 miles (13 km)	300 yd (270 m)
EF2	Two homes and two mobile homes were destroyed near the Canadian River and another mobile home had its roof completely torn off. Several cars, trees, and power lines were damaged or destroyed.						
EF1	SW of Bushton	Rice, Ellsworth	KS	38.4893°N 98.4392°W	02:42–02:51	4.49 mi (7.23 km)	75 yd (69 m)
EF1	Power lines were downed along K-4.						
EF0	ENE of Seward	Stafford	KS	38.185°N 98.762°W	02:50–02:53	1.9 mi (3.1 km)	50 yd (46 m)
EF0	Trained spotters observed a tornado over open fields.						
EF0	SW of Petersburg	Boone	NE	41.7784°N 98.176°W	03:15–03:18	0.5 mi (0.80 km)	100 yd (91 m)
EF0	A brief tornado downed trees.						
EF0	E of Zeandale	Riley	KS	39.17°N 96.3899°W	03:34	0.25 mi (0.40 km)	50 yd (46 m)
EF0	A brief tornado occurred over open fields.						
EF1	ESE of Harmon	Ellis, Dewey, Woodward	OK	36.1202°N 99.4811°W	03:50–03:55	3.5 miles (5.6 km)	400 yd (370 m)
EF1	Power lines were downed.						
EF1	SW of Westfall	Lincoln	KS	38.8891°N 98.0525°W	03:51–03:57	2 mi (3.2 km)	75 yd (69 m)
EF1	A few barns and sheds were damaged; trees and power lines were downed.						
EF2	S of Sharon to ENE of Sharon	Woodward	OK	36.1716°N 99.33°W	03:55–04:30	13.5 mi (21.7 km)	600 yd (550 m)
EF2	Near the tornado's origin point, west of SH-34, one home had its roof removed, a rail car containing cement bags and animal feed was rolled 140 feet (43 m), and a pickup truck was moved 80 feet (24 m). After moving through several miles of rural land, the tornado destroyed three barns east of Sharon. Several other structures had minor damage, including blown out windows, and a semi-trailer was blown over. Many large trees were downed and 56 power poles were snapped along the tornado's path.						
EF0	S of Bennington	Ottawa	KS	38.9892°N 97.6°W	04:22	0.25 mi (0.40 km)	50 yd (46 m)
EF0	Local law enforcement observed a brief tornado over open fields.						
EF2	N of Bennington	Ottawa	KS	38.9892°N 97.6°W	04:39–04:55	11 mi (18 km)	100 yd (91 m)
EF2	1 death – This tornado moved along a nearly due north path; 38 structures were damaged or destroyed along its track, including mobile homes, cabins, cottages, and outbuildings. An anchored mobile home was among the destroyed buildings. Several well-built homes had their roofs torn off. One person was killed and another was injured when their camping trailer was flipped. Four other people were injured in other incidents.						
EF0	SW of Pampa	Gray	TX	35.4789°N 101.0328°W	04:40–04:46	2 mi (3.2 km)	300 yd (270 m)
EF0	Three buildings and several oil rigs were damaged at the National Oilwell Varco Plant.						

=== May 6 event ===
List of confirmed tornadoes – Sunday, May 6, 2007
EF#	Location	County / Parish	State	Start Coord.	Time (UTC)	Path length	Max width
EF1	E of Delphos to N of Miltonvale	Ottawa, Cloud	KS	39.28°N 97.5272°W	05:01–05:12	10.08 mi (16.22 km)	200 yd (180 m)
EF1	Several outbuildings, trees, and a barn were destroyed and four homes suffered damage.						
EF1	SSW of Enosdale	Washington	KS	39.7433°N 97.1844°W	05:50–05:51	1.38 mi (2.22 km)	200 yd (180 m)
EF1	A brief tornado damaged a home and shifted it off its foundation, rending the structure a loss. A second home and shed were also damaged and outbuildings were destroyed. Many trees had their tops shorn off.						
EF1	Stanton	Montgomery	IA	40.9366°N 95.1775°W	07:21–07:31	7.36 mi (11.84 km)	300 yd (270 m)
EF1	This tornado moved along a southwest to northeast trajectory, passing very near Stanton. Damage was confined to farm buildings and trees.						
EF2	ESE of Griswold	Cass	IA	41.1783°N 94.984°W	07:40–07:49	7.43 mi (11.96 km)	830 yd (760 m)
EF2	This strong tornado touched down just within the southeastern corner of Cass County and quickly impacted farmsteads. The most severe damage occurred a few miles south of Lyman along U.S. Route 71 where two grain bins and a metal truck service building were flattened. Semi-trailers were flipped at this location. A service building and grain bins were leveled and semi-trailers were flipped. An office building had a portion of its roof torn off and a nearby home had lesser roof damage. Elsewhere along the tornado's path, trees, farms, and power poles were damaged. Total damage was estimated at $1 million.						
EF1	S of Bayard	Guthrie	IA	41.8066°N 94.57°W	09:37–09:39	1.17 mi (1.88 km)	50 yd (46 m)
EF1	A brief tornado tore the roof off a building.						
EF0	NW of Thayer	Union	IA	41.0607°N 94.0907°W	09:45–09:50	4.2 mi (6.8 km)	50 yd (46 m)
EF0	Storm damage surveys indicated a weak tornado occurred along the backside of a bow-echo. Several farmsteads were damaged.						
EF0	SE of Attica	Harper	KS	37.1993°N 98.1915°W	15:20–15:22	1 mi (1.6 km)	50 yd (46 m)
EF0	A brief tornado occurred over open fields.						
EF0	NNW of Hardtner	Barber	KS	37.0847°N 98.6824°W	21:27–21:35	3.01 mi (4.84 km)	300 yd (270 m)
EF0	Storm chasers observed two simultaneous, rain-wrapped tornadoes in rural Barber County; neither impacted structures.						
EF0	WSW of Gerlane	Barber	KS	37.1207°N 98.6673°W	21:33–21:37	1.34 mi (2.16 km)	50 yd (46 m)
EF0	Storm chasers observed two simultaneous, rain-wrapped tornadoes in rural Barber County; neither impacted structures.						
EF0	W of Medicine Lodge	Barber	KS	37.2842°N 98.6806°W	21:40–21:43	1.43 mi (2.30 km)	50 yd (46 m)
EF0	A brief tornado occurred over open fields.						
EF0	E of Robert Lee	Coke	TX	31.9°N 100.3991°W	22:10–22:15	1.89 mi (3.04 km)	30 yd (27 m)
EF0	A brief tornado occurred over open fields.						
EF0	S of Langdon	Reno	KS	37.8283°N 98.32°W	22:30–22:36	4.2 mi (6.8 km)	75 yd (69 m)
EF0	A tornado caused minor tree damage.						
EF0	W of Hutchinson	Reno	KS	38.07°N 98.0669°W	23:00–23:01	0.5 mi (0.80 km)	40 yd (37 m)
EF0	Local emergency management observed a brief tornado.						
EF0	W of Mertzon	Irion	TX	31.27°N 100.97°W	23:42–23:52	0.41 mi (0.66 km)	25 yd (23 m)
EF0	A tornado was observed from the San Angelo National Weather Service office.						
EF0	Steele City	Jefferson	NE	40.03°N 97.02°W	00:50–00:53	1 mi (1.6 km)	300 yd (270 m)
EF0	A brief tornado occurred within a larger downburst. Several buildings had roof and window damage, including Steele City's town hall. A few trees were also uprooted.						
EF0	ENE of Seminole	Seminole	OK	35.2411°N 96.6473°W	02:23	0.2 mi (0.32 km)	20 yd (18 m)
EF0	A brief tornado flipped a mobile home into another mobile home, and knocked a tree onto a trailer and car.						
EF0	E of Little	Seminole	OK	35.35°N 96.6446°W	02:38	0.2 mi (0.32 km)	20 yd (18 m)
EF0	A brief tornado damaged the roofs of two barns and snapped tree branches.						

=== May 7 event ===
List of confirmed tornadoes – Monday, May 7, 2007
EF#	Location	County / Parish	State	Start Coord.	Time (UTC)	Path length	Max width	Summary
EF0	Northeastern Oklahoma City	Oklahoma	OK	35.5093°N 97.4776°W	07:32–07:33	1.5 mi (2.4 km)	30 yd (27 m)	A narrow path off tree damage occurred along with minor shingle damage, wood fences blown over and a small canopy torn.
EF0	WSW Dale	Pottawatomie	OK	35.3689°N 97.0828°W	08:15	0.1 mi (0.16 km)	20 yd (18 m)	Large branches were broken off of a few trees.

=== May 8 event ===
List of confirmed tornadoes – Tuesday, May 8, 2007
EF#	Location	County / Parish	State	Start Coord.	Time (UTC)	Path length	Max width	Summary
EF0	NNW of Acampo to WSW of Fort Griffin	Shackelford	TX	32.7975°N 99.4682°W	21:11–21:30	6.54 mi (10.53 km)	50 yd (46 m)	
EF1	S of Haskell	Haskell	TX	33.0945°N 99.7127°W	22:30–22:45	4.16 mi (6.69 km)	45 yd (41 m)	
EF0	NW of Throckmorton	Throckmorton	TX	33.2485°N 99.2619°W	22:54–22:58	0.75 mi (1.21 km)	40 yd (37 m)	
EF0	W of Lake Ellsworth	Comanche	OK	34.83°N 98.4028°W	01:15	0.2 mi (0.32 km)	30 yd (27 m)	
EF1	SW of Minco	Grady	OK	35.2924°N 97.9638°W	03:54–03:58	1.5 mi (2.4 km)	30 yd (27 m)	
EF0	W of Union City	Canadian	OK	35.38°N 97.9726°W	04:26–04:30	2.2 mi (3.5 km)	40 yd (37 m)	
EF1	Southern El Reno	Canadian	OK	35.4966°N 97.9753°W	04:43–04:50	1.75 mi (2.82 km)	150 yd (140 m)	
EF1	WSW of Piedmont	Canadian	OK	35.6223°N 97.8322°W	05:08	0.6 mi (0.97 km)	80 yd (73 m)	
EF1	NNW of Piedmont	Canadian	OK	35.6901°N 97.7704°W	05:21	0.2 mi (0.32 km)	30 yd (27 m)	

=== May 9 event ===
List of confirmed tornadoes – Wednesday, May 9, 2007
EF#	Location	County / Parish	State	Start Coord.	Time (UTC)	Path length	Max width	Summary
EF0	NW of Sonora	Sutton	TX	30.6395°N 100.8145°W	20:48–20:55	1.19 mi (1.92 km)	30 yd (27 m)	
EF0	WNW of Woodson	Throckmorton	TX	33.0644°N 99.1779°W	21:04–21:08	0.9 mi (1.4 km)	20 yd (18 m)	
EF0	SE of Callan to WNW of Calf Creek	Menard, McCulloch	TX	30.9809°N 99.6194°W	23:12–23:18	1.5 mi (2.4 km)	40 yd (37 m)	

=== May 10 event ===
List of confirmed tornadoes – Thursday, May 10, 2007
EF#	Location	County / Parish	State	Start Coord.	Time (UTC)	Path length	Max width	Summary
EF0	N of Elk Lake	Susquehanna	PA	41.7704°N 75.9774°W	19:05–19:15	2.9 mi (4.7 km)	75 yd (69 m)	
EF0	S of Perth	Sumner	KS	37.1411°N 97.5°W	21:30–21:31	0.5 mi (0.80 km)	30 yd (27 m)	
EF0	E of Eureka	Greenwood	KS	37.82°N 96.117°W	22:15–22:17	1 mi (1.6 km)	30 yd (27 m)	

=== May 14 event ===
List of confirmed tornadoes – Monday, May 14, 2007
EF#	Location	County / Parish	State	Start Coord.	Time (UTC)	Path length	Max width	Summary
EF0	SW of Lenora	Norton	KS	39.5591°N 100.0531°W	23:25–23:26	0.25 mi (0.40 km)	10 yd (9.1 m)	
EF0	NW of Fort Lupton	Weld	CO	40.09°N 104.81°W	00:28	0.1 mi (0.16 km)	50 yd (46 m)	
EF0	NNW of Bristol	Prowers	CO	38.1467°N 102.3341°W	03:37–03:39	0.78 mi (1.26 km)	75 yd (69 m)	
EF0	S of Lamar	Prowers	CO	38.0077°N 102.62°W	03:50–03:52	0.5 mi (0.80 km)	75 yd (69 m)	
EF0	N of Bristol	Prowers	CO	38.1489°N 102.32°W	04:10–04:12	0.5 mi (0.80 km)	75 yd (69 m)	

=== May 15 event ===
List of confirmed tornadoes – Tuesday, May 15, 2007
EF#	Location	County / Parish	State	Start Coord.	Time (UTC)	Path length	Max width	Summary
EF0	SSE of New Carlisle	St. Joseph	IN	41.6802°N 86.509°W	20:45–20:47	2.07 mi (3.33 km)	50 yd (46 m)	
EF0	SW of North Vernon	Jennings	IN	38.9284°N 85.722°W	01:35–01:36	0.1 mi (0.16 km)	50 yd (46 m)	
EF0	NE of Springfield	Clark	OH	39.9507°N 83.76°W	03:05–03:10	0.15 mi (0.24 km)	30 yd (27 m)	

=== May 16 event ===
List of confirmed tornadoes – Wednesday, May 16, 2007
EF#	Location	County / Parish	State	Start Coord.	Time (UTC)	Path length	Max width	Summary
EF1	SW of Newton	Fairfield	CT	41.3996°N 73.3473°W	20:08–20:13	4.5 mi (7.2 km)	100 yd (91 m)	
EF0	Schaumburg	Cook	IL	42.03°N 88.08°W	22:52–22:53	0.5 mi (0.80 km)	15 yd (14 m)	

=== May 17 event ===
List of confirmed tornadoes – Thursday, May 17, 2007
EF#	Location	County / Parish	State	Start Coord.	Time (UTC)	Path length	Max width	Summary
EF0	W of Guernsey	Platte	WY	42.27°N 105.0035°W	21:29–21:33	0.1 mi (0.16 km)	30 yd (27 m)	
EF0	E of Fruitville	Sarasota	FL	27.33°N 82.4212°W	21:41–21:43	0.3 mi (0.48 km)	30 yd (27 m)	

=== May 18 event ===
List of confirmed tornadoes – Friday, May 18, 2007
EF#	Location	County / Parish	State	Start Coord.	Time (UTC)	Path length	Max width	Summary
EF0	WSW of Karnak	Griggs	ND	47.264°N 98.1271°W	23:52–23:53	0.1 mi (0.16 km)	25 yd (23 m)	
EF0	WNW of Sibley	Barnes	ND	47.2222°N 98.0088°W	00:00–00:01	0.1 mi (0.16 km)	25 yd (23 m)	
EF0	E of North Valley City	Barnes	ND	46.95°N 97.96°W	01:50–01:51	0.1 mi (0.16 km)	25 yd (23 m)	

=== May 20 event ===
List of confirmed tornadoes – Sunday, May 20, 2007
EF#	Location	County / Parish	State	Start Coord.	Time (UTC)	Path length	Max width	Summary
EF1	SW of Gillette	Campbell	WY	44.096°N 105.7366°W	01:12–01:17	2 mi (3.2 km)	10 yd (9.1 m)	

=== May 21 event ===
List of confirmed tornadoes – Monday, May 21, 2007
EF#	Location	County / Parish	State	Start Coord.	Time (UTC)	Path length	Max width	Summary
EF0	NE of Glen Ullin	Morton	ND	46.8609°N 101.7702°W	00:15–00:17	0.3 mi (0.48 km)	50 yd (46 m)	
EF0	ENE of Glen Ullin	Morton	ND	46.8753°N 101.6347°W	00:22–00:23	0.2 mi (0.32 km)	35 yd (32 m)	

=== May 22 event ===
List of confirmed tornadoes – Tuesday, May 22, 2007
EF#	Location	County / Parish	State	Start Coord.	Time (UTC)	Path length	Max width	Summary
EF0	WSW of Hill City	Graham	KS	39.3147°N 100.0227°W	23:48–23:54	2 mi (3.2 km)	20 yd (18 m)	
EF0	N of Weskan	Wallace	KS	38.9278°N 101.97°W	23:49–23:53	2.5 mi (4.0 km)	10 yd (9.1 m)	
EF0	SW of Hill City	Graham	KS	39.2882°N 99.9557°W	00:10–00:16	2.5 mi (4.0 km)	50 yd (46 m)	
EF0	W of Oakley	Logan	KS	39.13°N 100.9432°W	01:02–01:03	0.25 mi (0.40 km)	10 yd (9.1 m)	
EF0	NE of WaKeeney	Trego	KS	39.08°N 99.8°W	01:18–01:20	0.88 mi (1.42 km)	50 yd (46 m)	
EF0	Angelus	Sheridan	KS	39.18°N 100.67°W	01:23–01:24	0.25 mi (0.40 km)	10 yd (9.1 m)	
EF0	N of Hays	Ellis	KS	38.95°N 99.32°W	02:56–02:57	0.54 mi (0.87 km)	30 yd (27 m)	

=== May 23 event ===
List of confirmed tornadoes – Wednesday, May 23, 2007
EF#	Location	County / Parish	State	Start Coord.	Time (UTC)	Path length	Max width	Summary
EF0	SE of Dennison	Goodhue	MN	44.3689°N 92.9585°W	21:10–21:15	2 mi (3.2 km)	50 yd (46 m)	
EF0	NW of Miami	Roberts	TX	35.9147°N 100.8947°W	21:28	0.2 mi (0.32 km)	25 yd (23 m)	
EF0	SSE of Perryton	Ochiltree	TX	36.0928°N 100.6422°W	22:25–22:27	1 mi (1.6 km)	50 yd (46 m)	
EF0	SSE of Perryton	Ochiltree	TX	36.1596°N 100.6765°W	22:39–22:41	1 mi (1.6 km)	50 yd (46 m)	
EF0	SW of Lipscomb	Lipscomb	TX	36.0664°N 100.4726°W	22:56–22:57	1 mi (1.6 km)	50 yd (46 m)	
EF0	SE of Perryton	Ochiltree	TX	36.11°N 100.34°W	23:14–23:15	2 mi (3.2 km)	50 yd (46 m)	
EF0	SE of Perryton	Ochiltree	TX	36.12°N 100.37°W	23:40–23:50	2 mi (3.2 km)	50 yd (46 m)	
EF0	SE of Williams	Edwards	KS	37.8°N 99.31°W	23:40–23:41	0.55 mi (0.89 km)	30 yd (27 m)	
EF0	NNW of Hodges	Edwards	KS	37.86°N 99.41°W	23:42–23:44	1.29 mi (2.08 km)	50 yd (46 m)	
EF0	SW of Darrouzett	Lipscomb	TX	36.3687°N 100.3962°W	00:39–00:45	2 mi (3.2 km)	50 yd (46 m)	
EF0	NE of Stinnett	Hutchinson	TX	35.9836°N 101.2481°W	01:15	0.1 mi (0.16 km)	25 yd (23 m)	
EF0	NE of Stinnett	Hutchinson	TX	35.9631°N 101.2733°W	01:17	0.1 mi (0.16 km)	50 yd (46 m)	
EF0	NW of Miami	Roberts	TX	36.0373°N 101.0463°W	02:28–02:32	2 mi (3.2 km)	100 yd (91 m)	
EF1	SSE of Perryton	Ochiltree	TX	36.05°N 100.42°W	02:43–02:50	3 mi (4.8 km)	880 yd (800 m)	
EF2	S of Booker to W of Lipscomb	Lipscomb	TX	36.1753°N 100.53°W	03:40–03:50	7 mi (11 km)	440 yd (400 m)	
EF1	SW of Lipscomb	Lipscomb	TX	36.1993°N 100.308°W	03:55–04:05	4 mi (6.4 km)	150 yd (140 m)	
EF2	S of Darrouzett	Lipscomb	TX	36.3143°N 100.32°W	04:11–04:26	8 mi (13 km)	528 yd (483 m)	

=== May 25 event ===
List of confirmed tornadoes – Friday, May 25, 2007
EF#	Location	County / Parish	State	Start Coord.	Time (UTC)	Path length	Max width	Summary
EF0	N of Casey to NW of Martinsville	Clark	IL	39.3723°N 87.98°W	19:53–20:03	2.5 mi (4.0 km)	30 yd (27 m)	
EF1	Killeen	Bell	TX	31.1096°N 97.7061°W	22:00–22:08	1.47 mi (2.37 km)	30 yd (27 m)	
EF0	N of Selfridge	Sioux	ND	46.1312°N 100.93°W	22:26–22:29	0.3 mi (0.48 km)	200 yd (180 m)	

=== May 26 event ===
List of confirmed tornadoes – Saturday, May 26, 2007
EF#	Location	County / Parish	State	Start Coord.	Time (UTC)	Path length	Max width	Summary
EF0	SSE of Squaw Lake	Itasca	MN	47.4831°N 94.0598°W	19:10–19:20	3 mi (4.8 km)	20 yd (18 m)	
EF0	SW of Holy Cross	Dubuque	IA	42.5874°N 90.9971°W	21:43	0.75 mi (1.21 km)	50 yd (46 m)	
EF0	SE of Milltown	Polk	WI	45.5096°N 92.4908°W	21:44–21:47	1 mi (1.6 km)	20 yd (18 m)	
EF0	NW of Cuba City	Grant	WI	42.6204°N 90.4578°W	23:15–23:16	0.3 mi (0.48 km)	40 yd (37 m)	
EF0	N of Baileyville	Nemaha	KS	39.9657°N 96.18°W	23:50	0.1 mi (0.16 km)	50 yd (46 m)	

=== May 27 event ===
List of confirmed tornadoes – Sunday, May 27, 2007
EF#	Location	County / Parish	State	Start Coord.	Time (UTC)	Path length	Max width	Summary
EF1	N of Lodgepole	Cheyenne	NE	41.2006°N 102.65°W	21:35–21:38	0.1 mi (0.16 km)	30 yd (27 m)	

=== May 28 event ===
List of confirmed tornadoes – Monday, May 28, 2007
EF#	Location	County / Parish	State	Start Coord.	Time (UTC)	Path length	Max width	Summary
EF0	Somers	Tolland	CT	41.98°N 72.45°W	17:00–17:02	0.13 mi (0.21 km)	20 yd (18 m)	
EF0	WSW of Wright	Campbell	WY	43.6647°N 105.6547°W	22:47–22:49	0.1 mi (0.16 km)	10 yd (9.1 m)	

=== May 29 event ===
List of confirmed tornadoes – Tuesday, May 29, 2007
EF#	Location	County / Parish	State	Start Coord.	Time (UTC)	Path length	Max width	Summary
EF0	WNW of Simla	Elbert	CO	39.21°N 104.17°W	21:27	0.1 mi (0.16 km)	100 yd (91 m)	
EF0	ESE of River Bend	Elbert	CO	39.27°N 103.76°W	22:00	0.1 mi (0.16 km)	50 yd (46 m)	
EF0	SE of Yuma	Yuma	CO	40.0791°N 102.6665°W	22:21–22:22	0.5 mi (0.80 km)	10 yd (9.1 m)	
EF0	SE of Wray	Yuma	CO	40.0698°N 102.2166°W	22:58–22:59	0.5 mi (0.80 km)	10 yd (9.1 m)	

=== May 30 event ===
List of confirmed tornadoes – Wednesday, May 30, 2007
EF#	Location	County / Parish	State	Start Coord.	Time (UTC)	Path length	Max width	Summary
EF1	E of Ayr	Cass	ND	47.03°N 97.4152°W	22:30–22:40	5 mi (8.0 km)	100 yd (91 m)	
EF0	S of Page	Cass	ND	47.1355°N 97.58°W	22:50–23:00	4.76 mi (7.66 km)	100 yd (91 m)	

=== May 31 event ===
List of confirmed tornadoes –Thursday, May 31, 2007
EF#	Location	County / Parish	State	Start Coord.	Time (UTC)	Path length	Max width	Summary
EF0	W of Prairie View	Phillips	KS	39.83°N 99.5888°W	20:10–20:12	0.25 mi (0.40 km)	25 yd (23 m)	
EF0	NNE of Keyes	Cimarron	OK	36.8601°N 102.2293°W	23:55	0.1 mi (0.16 km)	100 yd (91 m)	
EF0	NNE of Sturgis	Cimarron	OK	36.9087°N 102.0351°W	00:11–00:12	0.3 mi (0.48 km)	100 yd (91 m)	
EF0	NNW of Eva	Texas	OK	36.8668°N 101.9346°W	00:42	0.1 mi (0.16 km)	50 yd (46 m)	
EF0	ENE of Eva	Texas	OK	36.8277°N 101.8166°W	00:49	0.1 mi (0.16 km)	75 yd (69 m)	
EF0	NW of Guymon	Texas	OK	36.8129°N 101.6459°W	00:58–01:00	0.5 mi (0.80 km)	150 yd (140 m)	
EF1	WSW of Hough	Texas	OK	36.8091°N 101.7536°W	01:06–01:17	5.27 mi (8.48 km)	300 yd (270 m)	
EF0	S of Petersburg	Hale	TX	33.8411°N 101.6°W	01:18–01:19	0.5 mi (0.80 km)	50 yd (46 m)	
EF0	WNW of Guymon	Texas	OK	36.7077°N 101.5633°W	01:24–01:25	0.1 mi (0.16 km)	75 yd (69 m)	
EF0	NE of Hargrave	Rush	KS	38.59°N 99.38°W	01:25–01:26	0.54 mi (0.87 km)	30 yd (27 m)	
EF0	SW of Floydada	Floyd	TX	33.8267°N 101.5148°W	01:27–01:28	0.25 mi (0.40 km)	50 yd (46 m)	

== See also ==
- Tornadoes of 2007
- List of United States tornadoes in April 2007
- List of United States tornadoes from June to July 2007
