= Lloyd Stearman =

American aviator, aircraft designer and entrepreneur (1898–1975)

Lloyd Carlton Stearman
- Born: October 26, 1898; Wellsford, Kansas
- Died: April 3, 1975 (aged 76); Northridge, Los Angeles, California
- Citizenship: United States
- Known for: Founder of Stearman Aircraft Corporation
- Children: William L. Stearman, Marylin Carr

Lloyd Carlton Stearman (October 26, 1898 – April 3, 1975) was an American aviator, aircraft designer, and early aviation entrepreneur.

== Biography ==
Stearman was born in Wellsford, Kansas. From 1917 – 1918, he attended Kansas State College (later renamed Kansas State University) in Manhattan, Kansas, where he studied engineering and architecture. In 1918, he left school to enlist in the U.S. Naval Reserve in San Diego, California; while there he learned to fly Curtiss N-9 seaplanes.

During the mid-1920s Matty Laird, designer of the Laird Swallow aircraft, hired Stearman as a mechanic, giving him his first exposure to fixed-wing aircraft manufacturing. In 1925, Stearman and Walter Beech teamed up with Clyde Cessna to form the Travel Air Manufacturing Company. In 1926, Stearman left to form his own manufacturing company in California, Stearman Aircraft. In 1927, he moved the company back to Wichita.

Following World War II, many Stearman PT-13 primary trainers were converted to agricultural aircraft; In 1948 more than 4,345 Stearman aircraft were used in agricultural flying.

In 1929, Stearman Aircraft merged with Boeing Airplane Co., Boeing Aircraft of Canada, Varney Airlines, National Air Transport, Pacific Air Transport, Boeing Air Transport, Hamilton Standard Propeller, Sikorsky, Pratt & Whitney, Chance Vought, Northrop and United Airports of Connecticut to become United Aircraft and Transport Corporation, owned by William Boeing. Stearman held the position of President of the Stearman Division until 1930, followed by his resignation in 1931.

In 1932, Stearman, Robert Gross, Walter Varney and others, bought Lockheed Aircraft Company. Stearman was named president and Carl B. Squier vice president.

In 1935, Stearman resigned from Lockheed, and from 1936 through 1938, partnered with Dean Hammond to form the Stearman-Hammond Aircraft Corporation to produce the Stearman-Hammond Y-1. In 1955, Stearman rejoined Lockheed as an engineer, where he retired in 1968.

Stearman died of cancer on April 3, 1975, at home in Northridge, Los Angeles.

== Legacy ==
In recognition of his contributions to the aircraft industry, Lloyd Stearman was inducted into the National Aviation Hall of Fame in Dayton, Ohio in July 1989.
