= William L. Stearman =

American foreign service officer (1922–2021)

William Lloyd Stearman
- Born: June 22, 1922; Wichita, Kansas, U.S.
- Died: October 2021 (aged 99)
- Education: University of Geneva, Graduate Institute of International Studies, Armed Forces Staff College
- Scientific career
- Workplaces: National Security Agency; United States Department of State

William Lloyd Stearman (June 22, 1922 – October 2021) was an American government official, aviator and author.

== Biography ==
William Lloyd Stearman was born on June 22, 1922, in Wichita, Kansas, the brother of Marilyn Stearman and son of Lloyd Stearman, the founder of Stearman Aircraft. After graduating high school in 1940, he went into the Navy's V-12 program. Then in 1944 he was commissioned as an ensign and attended midshipman's school. After training Stearman left to go to the Pacific. He was in the 7th Amphibious Fleet and was involved in the Philippines campaign (1944–1945) and in the Borneo campaign. After World War II he entered the foreign service. He was a stationed in Vienna, Berlin, Bonn and Saigon. In 1971, he joined the National Security Council staff and remained until 1976. From 1977 to 1981, he was an adjunct professor at Georgetown University where he was Director of the Russian Studies Program. He then became a staff member of the National Security Council again (1981–1994), eventually serving under four Presidents. He was also an advisor to United States Secretary of State, Henry Kissinger and was considered an expert on Vietnam. Later, he served as the assistant director of the Arms Control and Disarmament Agency. He retired as a Senior U.S. Foreign Service Officer. He was a founding member of Vietnam Veterans for Factual History.

He earned a BA from the University of California, Berkeley and an MA and Ph.D. from the University of Geneva-affiliated Graduate Institute of International Studies. He was also a graduate of the Armed Forces Staff College.

In 2012, Stearman wrote a memoir entitled "An American Adventure: From Early Aviation Through Three Wars, to the White House", which has been described as "a fascinating accounting of his own remarkable life and the tumultuous times in which he lived."

One of the last articles he wrote before his death was "I Owe My Life to the A-Bomb". He died in October 2021, at the age of 99.
