= Orient, Texas =

Unincorporated community in Texas, US

Orient is an unincorporated community in northeastern Tom Green County, Texas, United States. It developed as a small settlement along the Kansas City, Mexico and Orient Railway, from which it derives its name.
