= Calf Creek, Texas =

Human settlement in Texas, United States of America

Coordinates: 30°58′44″N 99°28′08″W

Calf Creek is a small community located in southern McCulloch County, Texas on Farm to Market Road 1311 approximately 15 miles (24 km) southwest of Brady.

== History ==
=== 1870s-1902 ===
Calf Creek has had three names and been at three locations. The first site was approximately two miles south of the present location and named Deland in honor of the original settler, Edward Elijah Deland. Deland was a farmer and also an inventor, being awarded a patent for an improved shepherd's crook in 1883. His daughter Minnie was the community's first school teacher and taught in a one-room schoolhouse which was a quarter mile north of the creek in the Deland pasture. Edward's son, Ira Deland, was the first mail carrier. The Deland Post Office operated from 1906 to 1909.

The Willhelms came from Germany in 1878, followed by the John I. Jones's, Willis Huey, Espy's and the Wheelers. Then there were the Young's, Groves, Marbys and Millers. The Jones family contributed much to build the community, and organized the first Presbyterian church. The committee chosen to give the church a name was Mabel Deland, Miss Johnny Jones and Buddy Yoas. They named it the Pecan Grove Presbyterian Church. Miss Johnny Jones was the assistant school teacher along with Minnie Deland. The Calf Creek school had one teacher and twenty-three students in 1898. Willis Huey gave land for a new school and the cemetery in 1902.

=== 1903-1914 ===
In 1903 the Melton Land Company put on a land site boom, selling off the Huey ranch by cutting it up into farms. This brought the Attaways, Kolbs, Whitleys, Hains, Tuckers, Stapps, Karneses and Crouches. In 1904 the Bridges, Hodges, Hazeltons, Whiteheads, Childresses, Devours and Gainers moved to the community.

In 1903 the J. W. Attaways organized the Baptist church and named it the Lone Star Baptist Church. About the same time, the Methodist church was organized with J. A. Whitley as the first pastor. The first Sunday School was organized by John L. Jones. Union literature was used with all churches banded together. This arrangement was used until 1940. Each summer, usually beginning the Friday before the first Sunday in August, a camp meeting was held on Calf Creek in the Deland place.

In 1905 the Alexander's built the first cotton gin and at one time Calf Creek had two operating cotton gins and they still could not keep up. The overflow had to be sent to nearby Brady.

In 1909 the center of the community shifted about a mile to the north and a new post office, named Tucker, was established in honor of local store owner Lum Tucker. The Tucker Post office operated from 1909 to 1915. Tucker had a cotton gin, a general store, and a blacksmith shop. Most of Tucker Texas was destroyed by a suspicious fire around 1915.

In 1914 telephones came to the community and for a while everyone had one for 75 cents a month. Mrs. W. W. Kolb operated the switchboard in her home.

=== 1915-2005 ===
In 1915 the community moved about a mile north to its present location and the post office changed its name to Calf Creek. The name "Calf Creek" comes from a nearby stream that originates northeast of Menard and runs 10 miles (16 km) to the San Saba River in northwest Mason County. The Calf Creek post office was discontinued on January 31, 1954.

Contrary to popular belief repeated in various other histories of Calf Creek, the land for the Calf Creek schoolhouse and cemetery were not donated by the Alexander family, but rather by the Huey family in 1902. The total amount of land donated by the Huey's was 6 acres (24,000 m^{2}). It seems that slightly over 2 acres (8,100 m^{2}) of this land was dedicated to cemetery use sometime between 1902 and 1903 and the remainder of the land tract used for school grounds. It is very likely that a wood-frame school building was used on this site between 1903 and 1921. The new school was built in 1921 from an $8000 bond project. The Calf Creek school was consolidated with Brady Texas Independent School District in 1949. The school building continued to be used as a church and for other community purposes for many years after the Calf Creek School was discontinued.

From about 1970 through 2004 the historic schoolhouse was increasingly vandalized and frequently used by vagrants and transients. During this period some people with strong ties to Calf Creek still hoped to bring new life to the schoolhouse, possibly repairing it for use as a community center, however, the schoolhouse was demolished in late 2004 and early 2005. An interesting side note is that, (according to the terms of the original land deed), the school property reverts to the Huey family now that the schoolhouse is gone.
