= Riverside, South Dakota =

Unincorporated community in South Dakota, U.S.

Coordinates: 43°43′22″N 97°56′54″W

Riverside is an unincorporated community in Hanson County, in the U.S. state of South Dakota.

== History ==
Riverside was named in 1899 from its location near the James River. A post office was established at Riverside in 1899, and remained in operation until it was discontinued in 1920.
