= Strahan, Iowa =

- Unincorporated community
- Location within Iowa
- Country: United States
- State: Iowa
- County: Mills
- Time zone: UTC-6 (Central (CST))
  - Summer (DST): CDT

Strahan was a town in Mills County, Iowa.

== History ==
Founded in the 1800s, Strahan's population was 21 in 1902, and 82 in 1925.

== See also ==
- Wabash Railroad
