= Dillwyn, Kansas =

Unincorporated community in Stafford County, Kansas

Coordinates: 37°58′15″N 98°52′47″W

Dillwyn is an unincorporated community in Stafford County, Kansas, United States. It is located southwest of St. John, next to a railroad at NW 10th Rd and NW 70th Ave (N Dillwyn Rd), approximately one mile north of U.S. Route 50 highway.

== History ==
The first post office in Dillwyn was established in 1888, but it was closed permanently by 1927.
