= Lutie, Texas =

- Unincorporated community
- Location within Texas Location within the United States
- Coordinates: 35°01′23″N 100°13′21″W
- Country: United States
- State: Texas
- County: Collingsworth
- Elevation: 2,231 ft (680 m)
- Time zone: UTC-6 (Central (CST))
  - Summer (DST): UTC-5 (CDT)
- Area code: 806
- GNIS feature ID: 1361984

Lutie is an unincorporated community in Collingsworth County, in the U.S. state of Texas. According to the Handbook of Texas, the community had a population of 35 in 1990.

== History ==
The population went down to only ten in 2000 through 2010.

On May 5, 2007, an EF0 tornado struck Lutie. Local law enforcement observed the tornado over open fields. A few minutes later, storm chasers observed an F1 tornado that largely remained over open fields. On May 16, 2017, an EF0 tornado struck Lutie. This brief tornado remained over open country and caused no damage.

== Geography ==
Lutie is located at the intersection of Farm to Market Road 1439 and U.S. Route 83, 13 mi (21 km) south of Shamrock, 12 mi (19 km) north of Wellington, 42 mi (68 km) north of Childress, and 95 mi (153 km) east of Amarillo in central Collingsworth County.

== Education ==
The Pleasant Valley Independent School District was established in Lutie in 1908 and had two teachers in 1925. Today, the community is served by the Wellington Independent School District.
