= Wellsford, Kansas =

Unincorporated community in Kiowa County, Kansas

- Unincorporated community
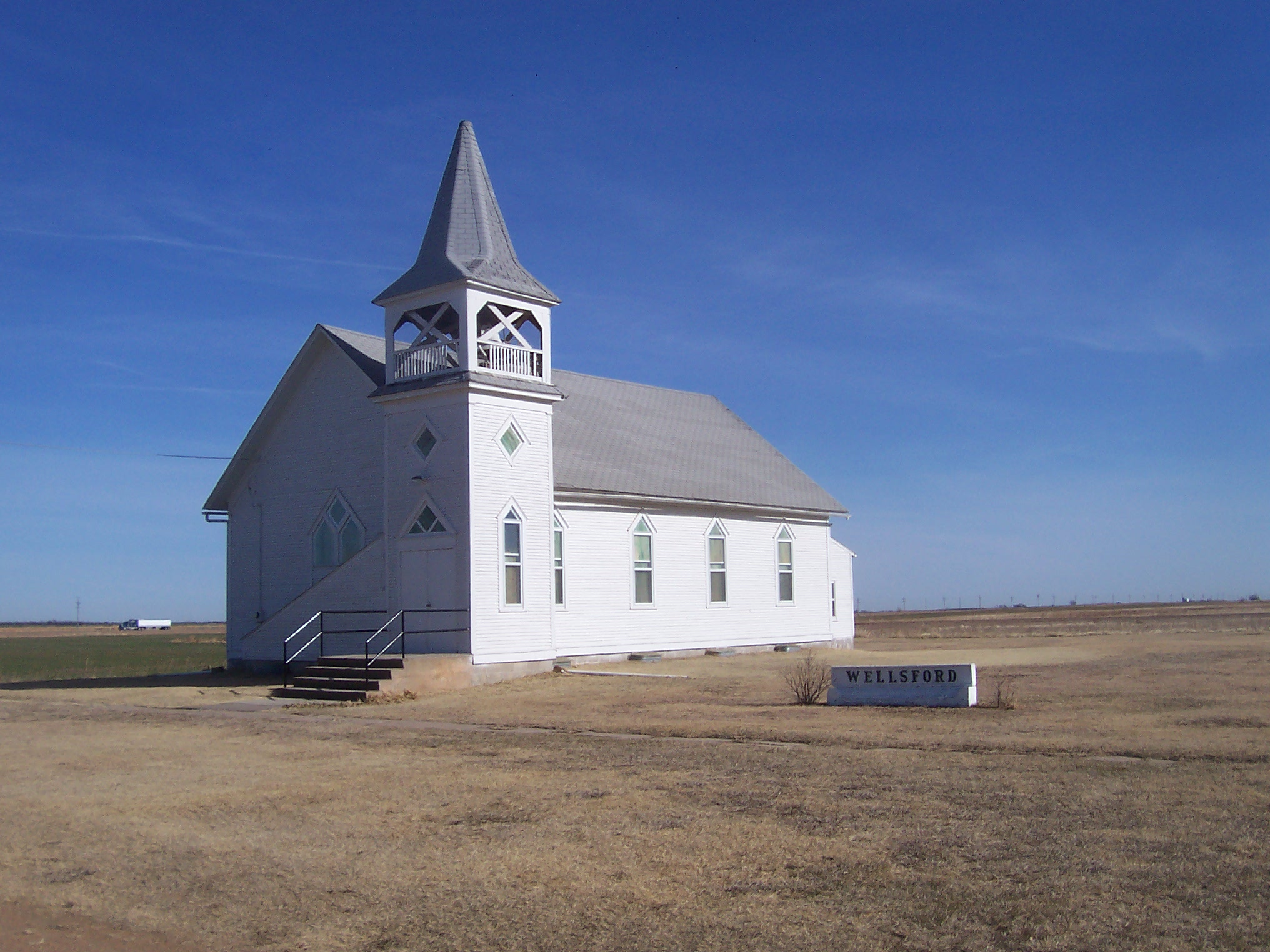
- Church in Wellsford (2006)

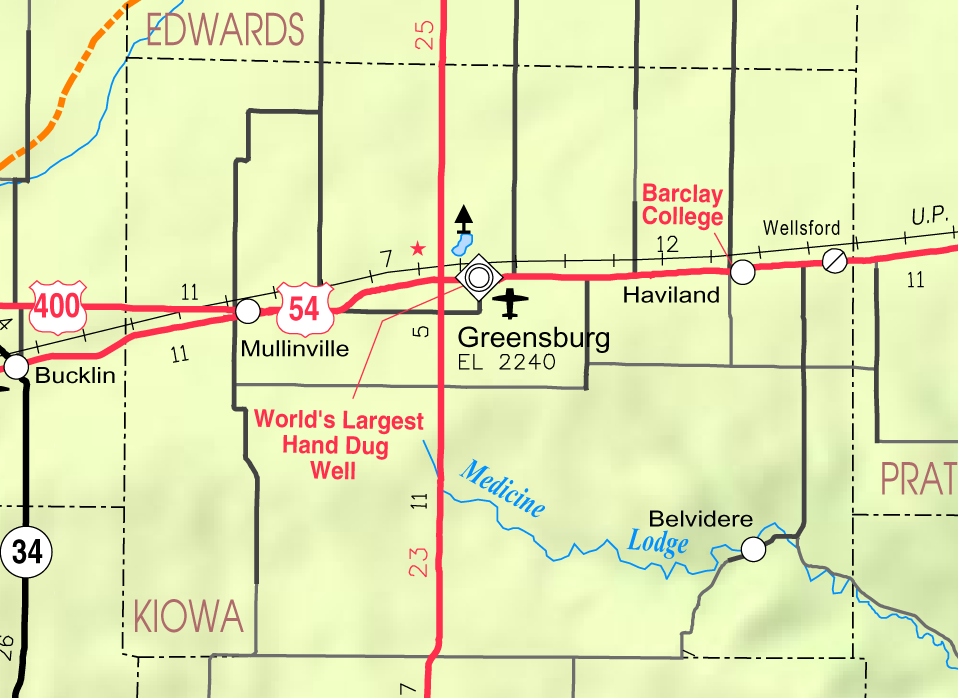
- KDOT map of Kiowa County (legend)

- Location within Kansas Location within the United States
- Coordinates: 37.6166851°N 99.0287147°W
- Country: United States
- State: Kansas
- County: Kiowa
- Founded: 1880s
- Incorporated: 1910s
- Disincorporated: 1975
- Elevation: 2,116 ft (645 m)
- Time zone: UTC-6 (CST)
  - Summer (DST): UTC-5 (CDT)
- Area code: 620
- FIPS code: 20-76575
- GNIS ID: 474264

Wellsford is an unincorporated community and former city in Kiowa County, Kansas, United States. It is located along Highway 54.

== History ==
Wellsford had a post office from the 1880s until 1955.

Previously, Wellsford was an incorporated city, but it disincorporated in 1975. Wellsford was incorporated in the 1910s and recorded a population of 140 in 1920. The population steadily declined thereafter, and in the last census taken while Wellsford was incorporated, in 1970, the town's population was only 9.

Wellsford was the most recent Kansas town to be disincorporated until Treece was in 2012.

Today, the townsite contains a church and a historic one-room jailhouse from the late 1800s.

== Geography ==
Wellsford is located at 37°37′00″N 99°01′43″W (37.6166851, -99.0287147).

== Notable people ==
- Lloyd Stearman, aircraft designer and early aviation entrepreneur, founder of Stearman Aircraft which later was merged into Boeing to become the Wichita division of Boeing.
