= Insurance Building (Ellsworth, Kansas) =

- U.S. National Register of Historic Places
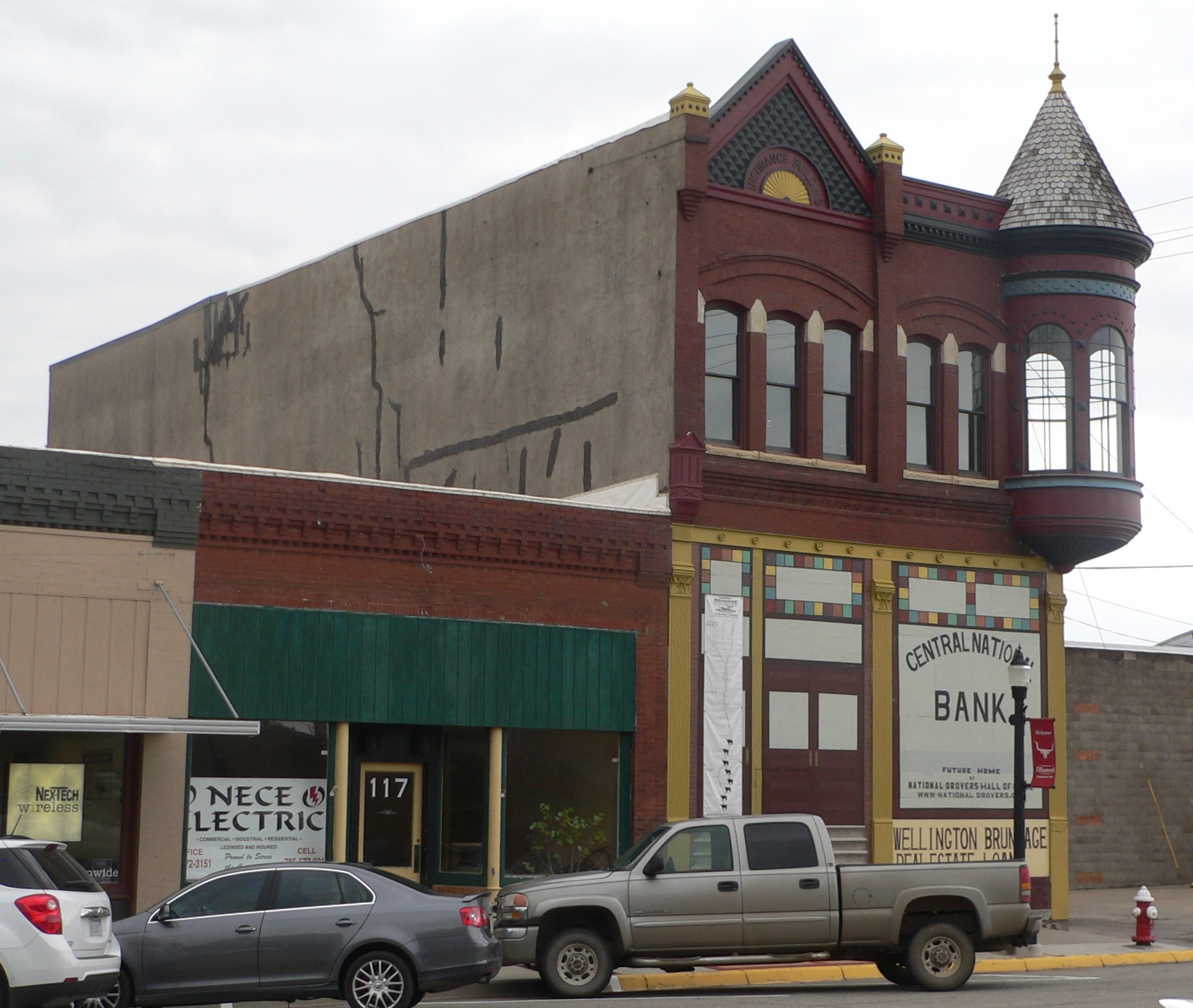

- Location within Kansas
- Location: 115 N. Douglas Ave., Ellsworth, Kansas
- Coordinates: 38.7291°N 98.2311°W
- Area: less than one acre
- Built: 1887-88, 1929
- Built by: Frank Easterly
- Architectural style: Late Victorian
- Part of: Ellsworth Downtown Historic District (ID07001065)
- NRHP reference No.: 06000595
- Added to NRHP: July 11, 2006

The Insurance Building in Ellsworth, Kansas, at 115 N. Douglas Ave., also known as the Wellington Insurance Building, is a two-story, Victorian-style brick commercial building. It was listed on the National Register of Historic Places in 2006. It is also a contributing building in the Ellsworth Downtown Historic District, which was listed on the National Register in 2007.

It was deemed significant "for its historical association with the growth and development of Ellsworth, Kansas and ... for its architectural significance as an example of Victorian eclectic commercial architecture." It was built during prosperity and growth in Ellsworth, after it became the northern end of the Texas cattle trail; the city shipped more than 3,000,000 cattle from 1871 to 1874.

It was built by Ellsworth contractor Frank Easterly in 1887-1888 and was modified in 1929, also by Easterly.
