= Ellsworth Downtown Historic District =

Historic district in Kansas, United States

- U.S. National Register of Historic Places
- U.S. Historic district
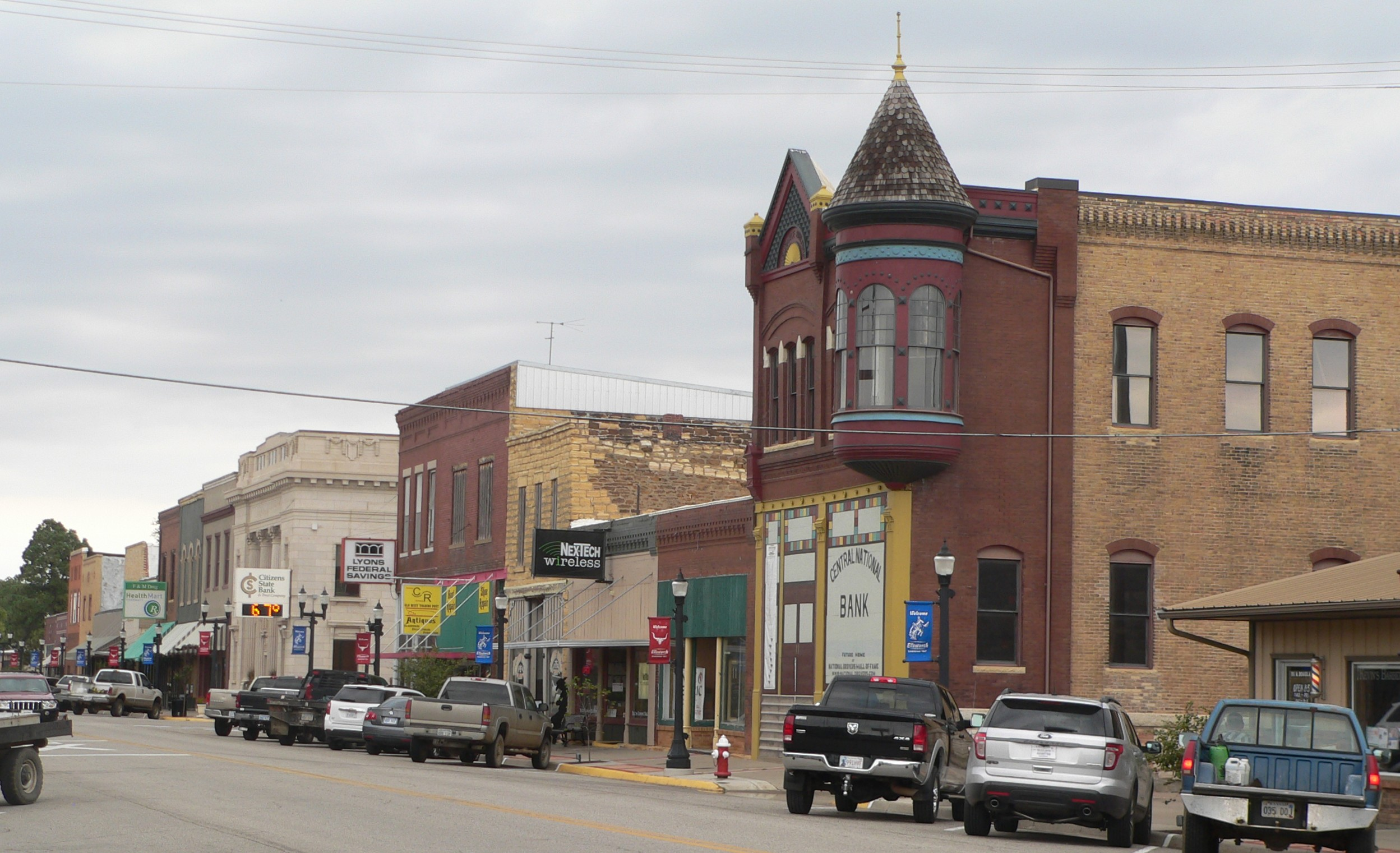

- Location within Kansas Location within the United States
- Location: Generally including blocks between N. Main & 3rd Sts. from Lincoln to Kansas Aves. & the west side of Kansas Ave., Ellsworth, Kansas
- Coordinates: 38°43′48″N 98°13′50″W
- Area: 30 acres (12 ha)
- Architect: John Seitz and others
- Architectural style: Late Victorian, Modern Movement
- NRHP reference No.: 07001065
- Added to NRHP: October 10, 2007

The Ellsworth Downtown Historic District is a historic district which was listed on the National Register of Historic Places in 2007.

The district is a 30 acres (12 ha) area generally including blocks between N. Main & 3rd Sts. from Lincoln to Kansas Avenues, plus the west side of Kansas Ave. It included 52 contributing buildings.

Its NRHP nomination asserted: "The buildings in downtown Ellsworth interpret the history of the community's permanent commercial development. The Ellsworth Downtown Historic District is being nominated to the National Register of Historic Places under Criterion A for its association with the growth and development of Ellsworth and Criterion C for its architectural significance."

It includes the Insurance Building, which was separately listed on the National Register in 2006.
